= Amstutz =

Amstutz is a surname. Notable people with the surname include:

- Adrian Amstutz (born 1953), Swiss politician
- J. Bruce Amstutz (1928–2021), American diplomat
- Dan Amstutz (1932–2006), American lobbyist
- Hobart Baumann Amstutz (1896–1980), American Methodist bishop
- Joe Amstutz (1934–2021), American football player
- Kayleigh Rose Amstutz (born 1998), better known as Chappell Roan, American singer-songwriter
- Reto Amstutz (born 1993), Swiss ice hockey player
- Ron Amstutz (born 1952), American politician
- Tom Amstutz (born 1955), American football coach
