= Embassy of the United States, Kabul =

Former U.S. diplomatic mission to Afghanistan

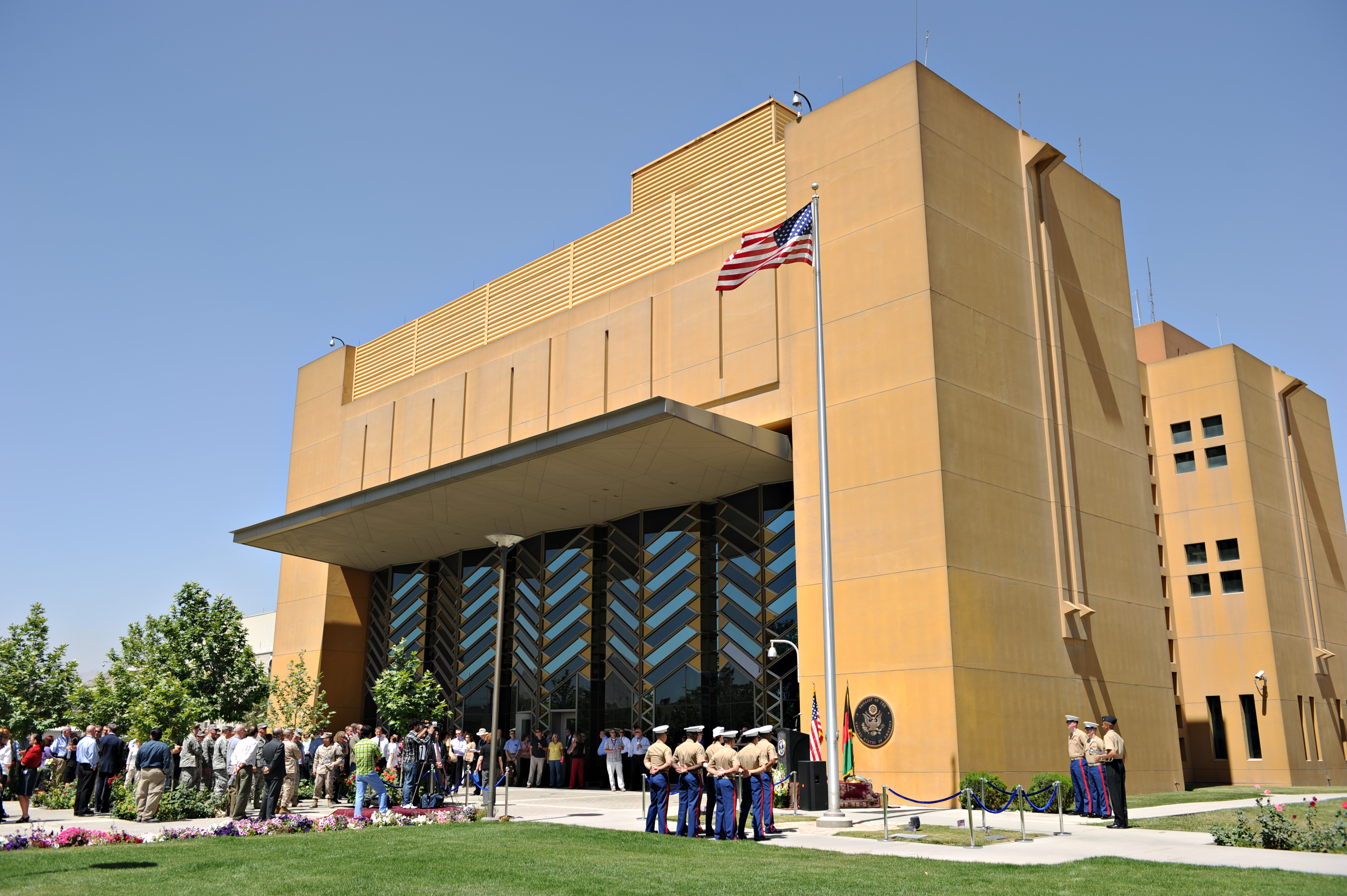
- Chancery Building as seen from its plaza
- Location: Bibi Mahru, Kabul, Afghanistan
- Coordinates: 34°32′28″N 69°9′38″E
- Opening: June 5, 1948 (original); January 17, 2002 (re-opening)
- Closed: August 31, 2021 (Note: The compound closed on August 15, 2021, but the embassy continued operating out of Hamid Karzai International Airport through the end of the Kabul airlift. The embassy formally suspended operations in Afghanistan on August 31, 2021, and transferred operations to Doha, Qatar.)
- Jurisdiction: Afghanistan
- Website: Official website

The Embassy of the United States of America in Kabul was the official diplomatic mission of the United States of America to the Islamic Republic of Afghanistan. Its chancery on Great Massoud Road in the Wazir Akbar Khan neighborhood of the Afghan capital of Kabul was built at a cost of nearly $800 million.

On August 15, 2021, in the face of a Taliban advance on Kabul, embassy staff moved to makeshift facilities at Hamid Karzai International Airport. Kabul fell and the chancery building officially closed later that day. The embassy lacked a Senate-confirmed ambassador at the time of the Taliban takeover; the final head of the mission in Afghanistan was Chargé d'Affaires Ross Wilson. On August 31, 2021, the embassy suspended operations in Afghanistan and transferred operations to Doha, Qatar, with former deputy chief of mission Ian McCary serving as Chargé d'Affaires. The U.S. Interests Section at the Embassy of Qatar in Kabul was established as the protecting power of the U.S. in Afghanistan on December 31.

== History ==
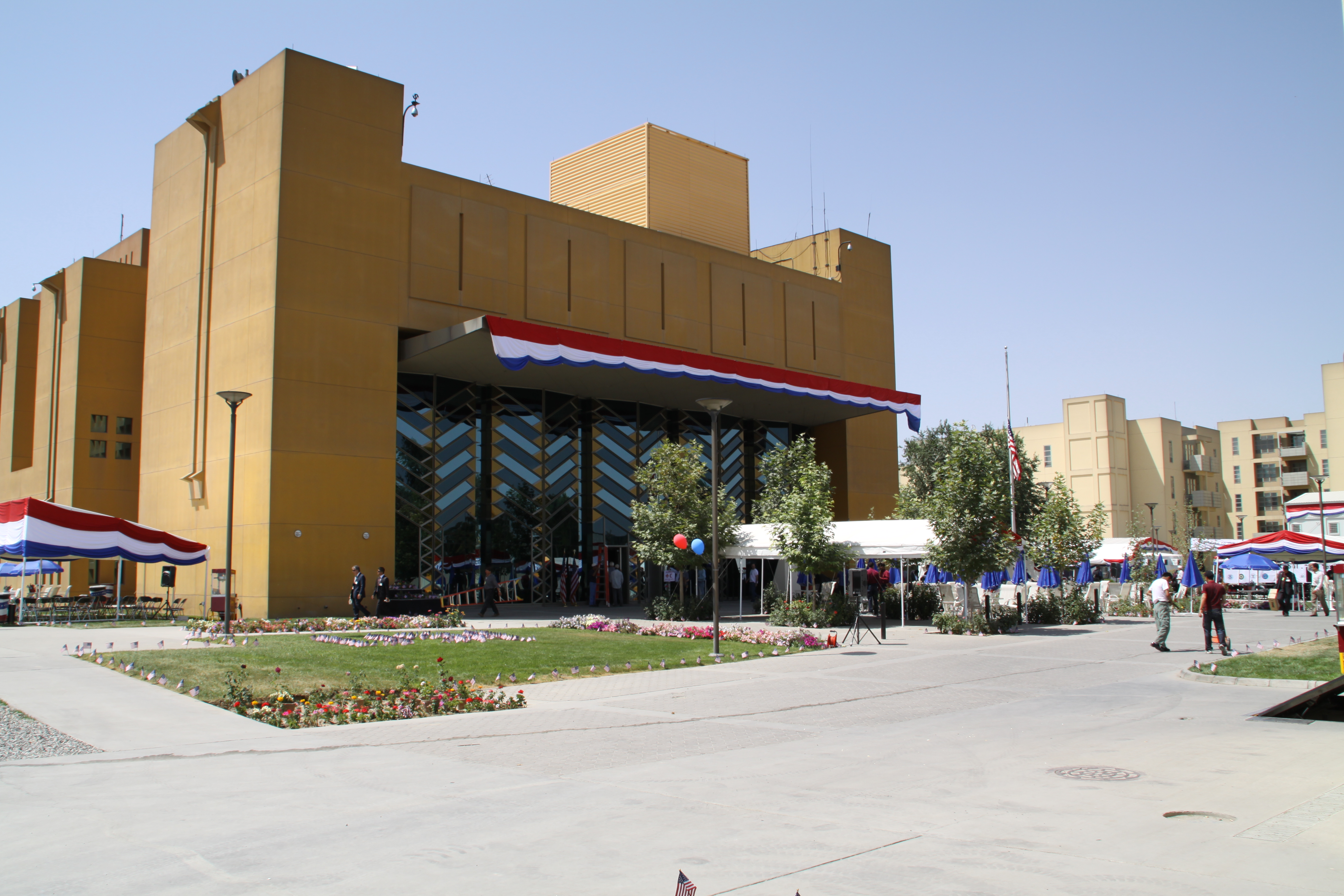
A United States Independence Day celebration outside the Chancery Building.

Initially, Afghanistan was served concurrently by the legation to Iran (Persia), with William H. Hornibrook serving as the first minister to the country. A legation in Kabul was established in 1942, which was elevated to an embassy in May 1948. Louis G. Dreyfus, who previously served as Minister Plenipotentiary from 1941 to 1942, then became the U.S. ambassador to Afghanistan, serving from 1949 to 1951. In 1979, then-ambassador Adolph Dubs was kidnapped and ultimately assassinated under mysterious circumstances. It was closed in 1989, before the start of the long civil war followed by the Taliban takeover. A U.S. liaison office was opened after the U.S.-led Operation Enduring Freedom in late 2001 before the embassy was reopened in 2002. A new complex was under construction until early 2006, when U.S. president George W. Bush along with Afghan president Hamid Karzai held an inauguration ceremony. The U.S. State Department planned to spend another $500 million to further expand its premises, which was scheduled to be completed in 2014. However, the U.S. State Department extended the completion date to July 2016. The final cost of the chancery was $792 million.

=== Operation Enduring Freedom ===
During the very early phases of Operation Enduring Freedom, a small detachment of U.S. Marines from Kilo Battery 3rd Battalion, 10th Marines, accompanied by a four-man Marine Scout/Sniper team from 3rd Battalion, 6th Marines, attached to the 26 MEU, who specialized in Embassy Reinforcement was tasked with retaking the U.S. Embassy in Kabul in early December 2001. This unit was part of one of the longest amphibious operations in Marine Corps history starting the assault from LCAC's into Pakistan then moving on to Bagram Airfield before the airfield was fully secured by U.S. and Coalition troops. The Marines set up camp inside of a factory building and secured local transportation in the form of Afghan private buses driven by Marines to disguise their pending assault on the embassy. They left in the early morning and secured and held the embassy until Diplomatic Security Services arrived to properly handle the sensitive information that was still locked in the embassy and to measure the compound's suitability for a continued U.S. presence on the site. Later that month, the Marines from this unit were the first Marines to raise the U.S. flag in the embassy since the embassy was closed in 1989. This was the same flag that had flown over the U.S. Embassy in Kabul that day when it closed in 1989.

=== September 2011 attack ===
Heavily armed Taliban insurgents wearing suicide vests struck various buildings in Kabul on 13 September 2011, and at least 7 people were killed and 19 wounded. The U.S. embassy was among the buildings targeted and several Afghan visa applicants who were waiting at the embassy were wounded. No embassy personnel were hurt in the incident. The United States blamed the Pakistani Army and its Inter-Services Intelligence (ISI) spy network for the attack. Another deadly attack at an annex to the embassy occurred later the same month.

=== April 2012 attack ===
As part of a nationwide series of coordinated attacks, Taliban elements attacked the embassy on April 15, 2012. The attack was defeated by Afghan security forces. Gen John Allen, commander of the International Security Assistance Force, stated he was "enormously proud" of the response mounted by Afghan security forces. He added: "No one is underestimating the seriousness of the attacks, and we'll work hard to determine the circumstances that led to today's events."

=== September 2019 attack ===
On September 11, 2019, a rocket exploded at the embassy, marking an attack on the 18th anniversary of the September 11 attacks.

=== COVID-19 outbreak June 2021 ===
The third wave of the COVID-19 pandemic in Afghanistan resulted in the infection of 159 embassy workers by June 22, 2021. There were several medical evacuations and at least one death. A mid-June report described COVID-19 as "surging" in the embassy, which was then subject to COVID-19 lockdowns. Remote work was mandated for all staff, as was adherence to social distancing requirements.

=== U.S. withdrawal from Afghanistan 2021 ===
On 14 April 2021, President Biden announced his intention to withdraw all regular US troops from Afghanistan by 11 September 2021. On 27 April, the State Department ordered employees at the Kabul embassy to leave if their "function [could] be performed elsewhere." The move was not expected to reduce embassy capability. At the time, the 2021 Taliban offensive had not yet begun.

The departure of U.S. military forces from Afghanistan was set to see approximately 650 Marines remain to protect diplomats and the embassy, which would remain open. Additionally, some would aid in guarding Hamid Karzai International Airport in Kabul, considered a "critical requirement to keeping any U.S. diplomatic staff in Afghanistan." Airport security was initially to be delegated to Turkey post-withdrawal, before the rapid Taliban offensive saw Kabul threatened within days. Navy Rear Adm. Peter Vasely led the embassy's 650-strong security mission.

On 2 July, Secretary of Defense Lloyd Austin approved U.S. Forces Afghanistan Forward, a new command for troops remaining in Afghanistan for embassy and airport security. Vasely became the senior U.S. military officer in Kabul and the command's leader; he is supported by Defense Security Cooperation Management Office Afghanistan in Qatar and reports to US Central Command (the military command responsible for the Middle East), commander General Kenneth F. McKenzie Jr.

On 7 August, the embassy issued a security alert urging all Americans to immediately leave Afghanistan due to increased security threats from the ongoing Taliban offensive and a reduction of staff at the embassy. The embassy offered repatriation loans to U.S. citizens to fly out of the country on commercial airlines. As a result of the Taliban's continuing offensive, the State Department considered an evacuation of the embassy. In an effort to avoid having to evacuate the embassy, U.S. negotiators reportedly sought assurances from the Taliban that they will not attack the embassy if they overrun Kabul.

Embassy officials reportedly clashed with Pentagon officials on whether or not to reduce the American diplomatic footprint as military forces withdrew.

==== Partial evacuation of embassy compound ====
On 12 August, the State Department announced a partial evacuation of the embassy. 3,000 U.S. soldiers and Marines were temporarily deployed to Kabul to evacuate an unspecified number of the 4,000 embassy staff, 1,400 of whom were U.S. citizens. State Department spokesman Ned Price stressed that the embassy would "remain open" with a "core diplomatic presence" remaining. In the event that Taliban forces assaulted the embassy mid-evacuation, a contingency force of 3,500 soldiers was sent to Kuwait.

On 13 August, Price stated that the Taliban had agreed not to attack diplomatic facilities, although he stressed that the U.S. was "not going to trust anything the Taliban says" and would verify intentions through intelligence. Embassy staff were ordered to destroy classified documents, electronics, and equipment, as well as American flags that could be "misused" for propaganda purposes. Citing unnamed officials, POLITICO reported that the Defense Department was preparing for a full evacuation and closure of the embassy and that USCENTCOM saw such an event as "inevitable."

==== Evacuation to Hamid Karzai International Airport ====
On August 14, soldiers and Marines already in Kabul enhanced security of Hamid Karzai International Airport for use by evacuating diplomatic staff and Special Immigrant Visa (SIV) Afghan embassy workers and translators. Military evacuation planes began flying out daily and the number of evacuated SIV recipients (Afghans that helped Americans and are at risk of Taliban retaliation) was increased. Spokesman Price stated that, as a contingency, embassy operations could be moved to the airport. President Biden additionally deployed a further 1,000 troops from the 82nd Airborne to Kabul to provide additional security.

Also on 14 August, the State Department requested help by humanitarian groups in identifying Afghans in need of evacuation. As of the weekend of August 14–15, informal groups of American NGOs, Afghanistan veterans, and former officials and diplomats began attempting to evacuate local Afghans awaiting official State Department evacuations or SIV application processing. Individuals leveraged connections with Congresspeople and then State and Defense Department officials to help evacuees, seeing the formal process as too bureaucratic and slow. The embassy's consular section also began soliciting information from non-diplomatic Americans citizens seeking evacuation from Afghanistan.

By early August 15, Taliban forces surrounded Kabul and sent unarmed fighters to negotiate a "peaceful transfer of power." Taliban spokesmen claimed to be in ongoing negotiations with the Afghan government and said their fighters had been ordered not to enter the city. On the same day, according to the BBC, Chargé d'Affaires Ross Wilson "fled the embassy" for heavily secure Hamid Karzai Airport.

Military helicopters made repeat trips to ferry all U.S. diplomats and officials from the embassy to the airport, firing flares to deter midair Taliban rocket attacks. Troops, contractors, and civilians also awaited for evacuation at the airport. The "core diplomatic presence" the State Department stated it would keep in Afghanistan on August 12 was moved to a new secure location in Hamid Karzai Airport.

Reportedly, Zalmay Khalilzad, American Special Representative for Afghanistan Reconciliation and chief negotiator in the Doha, Qatar peace talks with the Taliban, asked the Taliban not to enter Kabul until the U.S. evacuated an estimated 10,000 American citizens, embassy staff, and current and former Afghan workers and translators that have assisted Americans. The Taliban countered by demanding an end to American airstrikes against their forces. Shortly after 2:00 pm UTC (6:30 pm in Afghanistan), some Taliban forces entered Kabul, although most fighters remained on the city's outskirts. President Ashraf Ghani had fled to Tajikistan or Uzbekistan shortly before and Vice President Amrullah Saleh also left. Taliban forces claimed to be seeking a "peaceful and satisfactory transfer of power;" there were few reports of conflict. Approximately 10 minutes later, Taliban fighters entered the city and occupied police districts to "prevent looting" and "maintain order" after Islamic Republic of Afghanistan forces fled; thus, Kabul fell without a fight.

Later, acting Interior Minister of Afghanistan Abdul Sattar Mirzakwal announced that the Western-backed Afghan government of the Islamic Republic of Afghanistan, would surrender to the Taliban, the post-2001 continuation of the former 1996-2001 Islamic Emirate of Afghanistan (IEA) (the Taliban still refer to themselves as the IEA). Mirzakwal also stated the Taliban would take control of the country through an interim government.

==== Comparisons to Fall of Saigon ====
Press and media observers have compared the rapid Taliban-induced Kabul embassy evacuation of Americans and locals at risk of retaliation to the 1975 Fall of Saigon, which saw the North Vietnamese People's Army of Vietnam take Saigon, the South Vietnamese capital, as Americans and South Vietnamese at risk of retaliation evacuated. Additionally, the Vietnam War and War in Afghanistan are both cited as long-running American campaigns in foreign wars with dubious results. Both evacuations have been described as frenzied, and the iconic image of South Vietnamese refugees fleeing by helicopter on a rooftop has been compared to the 2021 use of helicopters in the Kabul embassy evacuation. While the building in the 1975 photograph is often misidentified as the U.S. Embassy in Saigon, it is actually 22 Gia Long Street, a nearby apartment building.

On July 8, before the Taliban had taken any provincial capitals, President Biden stated that "there's going to be no circumstance where you see people being lifted off the roof of an embassy [like in Saigon]...[the situations are] not at all comparable."

On August 13, before Taliban forces had surrounded Kabul, Republican Senate Minority Leader Mitch McConnell characterized Biden's actions as leaving the U.S. "hurtling toward an even worse sequel to the humiliating fall of Saigon." On August 14, Republican Representative Steve Scalise called the evacuation "Biden's Saigon moment." On August 15, Secretary of State Antony Blinken explicitly rejected the comparison to ABC News and CNN, saying "this is not Saigon." Blinken cited the larger military presence, which he said created a more orderly evacuation, as evidence. Democratic Rep. Stephanie Murphy stated "I know what an orderly departure looks like. I'm disappointed that this is the way in which we are withdrawing."

In his August 16 remarks on the Fall of Afghanistan, Biden compared the war in Afghanistan to the Vietnam War but did not mention the evacuation at Saigon.

==== At airport compound ====
On August 15, Blinken stated that the embassy had been moved to Hamid Karzai International Airport, under guard by U.S., NATO, Islamic Republic of Afghanistan and private Afghan security contractor forces.

The heavy U.S. troops reportedly was partially to deter mutiny by Afghan contractors not yet assured safe passage out of the country. Chargé d'Affaires Ross Wilson was evacuated to the airport around 7:50 pm local time (3:15 pm UTC); the embassy's U.S. flag was also sent to the airport. By 7:00 pm local time (2:30 pm UTC), all embassy staff had been relocated to the airport.

Around 8:10 pm local time (3:40 pm UTC), gunfire was reported at the airport. U.S. citizens in the area were instructed to take shelter. Defense Secretary Lloyd Austin authorized the deployment of 1,000 additional troops to Kabul amid the deteriorating situation; the 1,000 were initially part of the 3,500 troops ordered to Kuwait on August 12 as a contingency reserve force.

Earlier media reports suggested that the embassy would be closed once all diplomatic staff had evacuated, but later reports stated that "certain staffers" would continue their work from a compound in the heavily guarded Hamid Karzai Airport while the embassy would be closed on August 17. As of early August 15, the United States planned to have all embassy staff evacuated from the embassy compound within the next 72 hours. Chargé d'Affaires Ross Wilson and a core diplomatic team are expected to remain at Hamid Karzai Airport for an unknown length of time. As of 1:30 AM, August 16 local time (9:00 PM UTC, August 15), 500 of the 4,000 US embassy workers, Afghan and American, had been evacuated. The number did not include the families of local Afghan employees. Reports later that day state the U.S. began prioritizing the evacuation of Americans over Special Immigrant Visa Afghans. Later in the day, U.S. troops took over air traffic control at the airport and stopped commercial flights. Also at 1:30 AM local time (9:00 PM UTC), citing several sources, CNN reported that the U.S. had begun curtailing flights for Afghans to prioritize American evacuees; the State Department stated it was speeding up evacuations for both Americans and Afghans.

As of the morning of August 16, the U.S. continued to evacuate its personnel on military planes from Hamid Karzai Airport's secure and guarded military portion. The State Department confirmed that all embassy personnel had been evacuated to the airport. Media reports and online videos posted from the airport showed the civilian side in disarray, with Afghan civilians storming the airport desperately attempting to secure passage or climb onto planes. In response, U.S. soldiers took control of the civilian portion. The Afghan Civil Aviation Authority suspended civilian flights in and out of Kabul. From 6:15 PM to 7:00 PM local time (1:45 PM UTC to 2:30 PM UTC), the U.S. suspended flights due to airfield crowding by Afghan civilians. Taliban forces in captured AFVs attempted to push back surging crowds and keep order.

At 7:45 PM local time (3:15 PM UTC), Taliban spokesman Suhail Shaheen stated "[the Taliban] assure all diplomats, embassies, consulates, and charitable workers, whether they are international or national, that not only no problem will be created for them [by the Taliban], but a secure environment will be provided." Around 30 minutes before noon (~8:00 PM local time, ~3:30 PM UTC), a CBS correspondent reported that the "tenuous" situation at Hamid Karzai Airport was causing the U.S. to consider ending the evacuation once all Americans were evacuated, leaving Afghans behind.

Around 10 minutes before noon (~8:20 PM local time, ~3:50 PM UTC), the U.S. once again halted all flights in and out of Kabul, military and civilian. By noon, approximately 3,000 of the 6,000 U.S. troops sent to the airport had arrived. Simultaneously, U.S. warplanes and armed drones flew over the airport. Two armed attackers were killed and one injured by U.S. troops at the airport perimeter, part of a larger crowd overrunning the airport; one U.S. soldier was injured in the incident. A second "hostile threat" resulted in no casualties. No Taliban interference in the evacuation has been confirmed. Around the same time, Afghan civilians overran security at the airport's civilian side; the Pentagon stated U.S. forces were "working to re-establish security." Three Afghans died after clinging to the hulls of moving planes and falling; in the chaos of crowds overrunning the airport and clinging to planes, a total of seven died. The Air Force Office of Special Investigations opened an investigation into the deaths on August 17; it received assistance from Air Mobility Command and unspecified "international partners."

Around evening on August 16 in Afghanistan, the Afghan Civil Aviation Authority (ACAA) stated that all Afghan airspace had been "released to the military," although it did not specify if this meant the collapsed Afghan National Security Forces, the U.S. forces already controlling air traffic from the airport, or other present military forces (such as those of NATO). The ACAA cited ongoing chaos at the airport, which has seen desperate Afghans overrun cordons and climb onto the outsides of planes, for its cession of control and for its suspension of all military and civilian flights in and out of the country; planes in the air diverted to nearby countries. As of 12:30 AM, August 17 in Afghanistan (8:00 PM UTC), around 100 of the 4,000 embassy staff remained at the airport. U.S. defense officials announced the resumption of flights around 2:05 AM, August 17 in Afghanistan (9:35 PM UTC); since civilian flights had been halted earlier on August 15, the resumption only applied to military flights.

Early August 17, crowds had thinned and U.S. and European forces were able to reestablish order. Around 8:00 AM local time (3:30 AM UTC), one Afghan was found dead in a U.S. plane's wheel well. Later on the day, Pentagon Press Secretary John Kirby stated the U.S. would soon be able to evacuate 5,000 to 9,000 people per day and that the Defense Department was directly speaking with the Taliban, which controls all outside access to the airport and, according to Kirby, has not impeded any travel there. The airport was also reopened to "limited commercial flights," which had been halted on August 16 when U.S. forces took over air traffic control. The situation outside the airport deteriorated as public disorder forced Afghan airport perimeter guards to respond and Taliban checkpoints throughout the city slowed and sometimes prevented the arrival of Afghan interpreters and Americans. National Security Advisor Jake Sullivan stated "by and large...people have been able to get to the airport," although he conceded the U.S. was in talks with the Taliban about instances of evacuees being "turned away or pushed back or even beaten."

Over the night of August 17-August 18 in Afghanistan (~7:30 PM UTC Aug. 17 - 1:30 AM UTC Aug. 18), 1,000 additional troops arrived, bringing the total number then at the airport to 4,000. Also overnight, 700 Afghans and 165 Americans were evacuated.

President Biden has insisted that the recent deployments, which brought the total number of U.S. troops in Afghanistan to roughly 7,000 (with only 4,000 having arrived at the airport), were not for combat purposes and did not affect his self-imposed total military evacuation date of August 31, 2021. All embassy staff were reportedly evacuated by August 28, and Wilson left on the last US military flight out of the country at 23:59 local time on August 30. No protecting power in Afghanistan was immediately designated by the United States. On August 31, the embassy suspended operations in Afghanistan, and transferred limited operations to Doha, Qatar. Deputy Chief of Mission Ian McCary took over as Chargé d'Affaires when the embassy relocated to Doha. On November 12, 2021, the U.S. announced that an interests section would open at the Embassy of Qatar in Kabul on December 31, to serve as the protecting power for the U.S. in Afghanistan. Under the arrangement, the interests section will operate out of the former U.S. Embassy compound, with Qatar assuming responsibility for the facility.

=== Islamic Emirate of Afghanistan ===
As of August 2022, one year after the fall of Kabul, the embassy compound is said to be in a state of lockdown and is not currently used by any person or entity.

== See also ==
- Afghanistan–United States relations
- Ambassadors of the United States to Afghanistan
- Embassy of Afghanistan, Washington, D.C.
- Ambassadors of Afghanistan to the United States
