= Karen B. Decker =

American diplomat

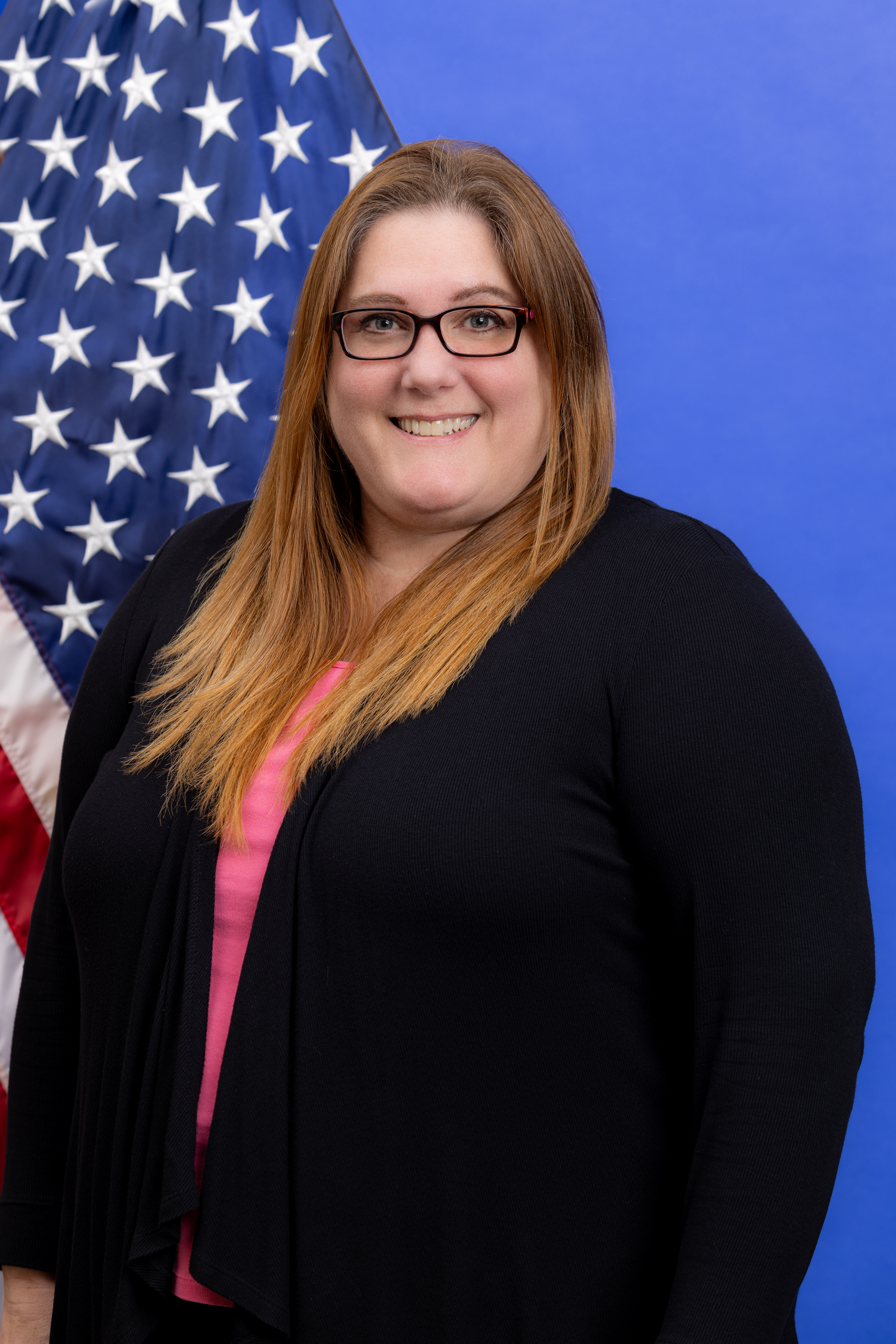
Decker in 2024

Karen B. Decker is an American diplomat who served as the U.S. chargé d'affaires to Afghanistan from August 1, 2022 to July 28, 2025.

== Career ==
A career Foreign Service officer of the United States Department of State (DOS), Decker has served in Pakistan, Bosnia, Greece, Estonia, Turkey, Syria, and Afghanistan. She was sent to Pakistan as her first overseas DOS assignment in 1990. Decker subsequently served in Bosnia from 1995 to 1998 and at the U.S. Mission to NATO from 1998 to 2001. She proceeded to serve as a political counselor in Greece from 2003 to 2006 and the deputy chief of mission at the Embassy of the United States, Tallinn from 2007 to 2010. From 2012 to 2014, Decker served as a DOS senior civilian representative in eastern Afghanistan.

In 2016 she was appointed the director of the Syria Transition Assistance Response Team (START), overseeing START field operations in Turkey and Syria until 2018. Decker served as the deputy chief of mission at the Embassy of the United States, Kabul from September 2018 to September 2020 before being appointed as chief of mission and chargé d'affaires of the U.S. Mission to Afghanistan in 2022. In addition to participating in Operation Allies Refuge in 2021, she has also worked at the United States Institute of Peace and Foreign Service Institute. Decker is the recipient of numerous awards, including the Director General’s Award for Reporting and Analysis from Colin Powell in 2001 and the Distinguished Honor Award in 2020.

== Twitter controversy ==
Avatar of Chargé d’Affaires Karen Decker

Chargé d’Affaires Karen Decker
(@USAmbKabul)
tweeted:

Are Afghans familiar with #BlackGirlMagic and the movement it inspired? Do Afghan girls need a similar movement? What about Afghan Women? Teach me, ready to learn. #BlackHistoryMonth @Beyonce @lizzo @ReginaKing

February 15, 2023

On February 15, 2023, Decker published a tweet on the U.S. embassy in Kabul's official Twitter account, inquiring about Afghan women's knowledge of Black Girl Magic "and the movement it inspired", tagging Beyoncé, Lizzo, and Regina King. Ned Price, the spokesperson for the United States Department of State, described the tweet as "inappropriate and ineffective", and The New Arab characterized it as "tone deaf". Decker subsequently apologized, claiming that "[I] haven’t listened enough or don’t truly understand others’ lived experience", and deleted the tweet.
