= Butrick =

Butrick is a surname. Notable people with the surname include:

- Daniel Sabin Butrick (1789–1851), American missionary
- Merritt Butrick (1959–1989), American actor
- Richard P. Butrick (1894-1997), American diplomat
