= Sheldon T. Mills =

American diplomat (1904–1988)

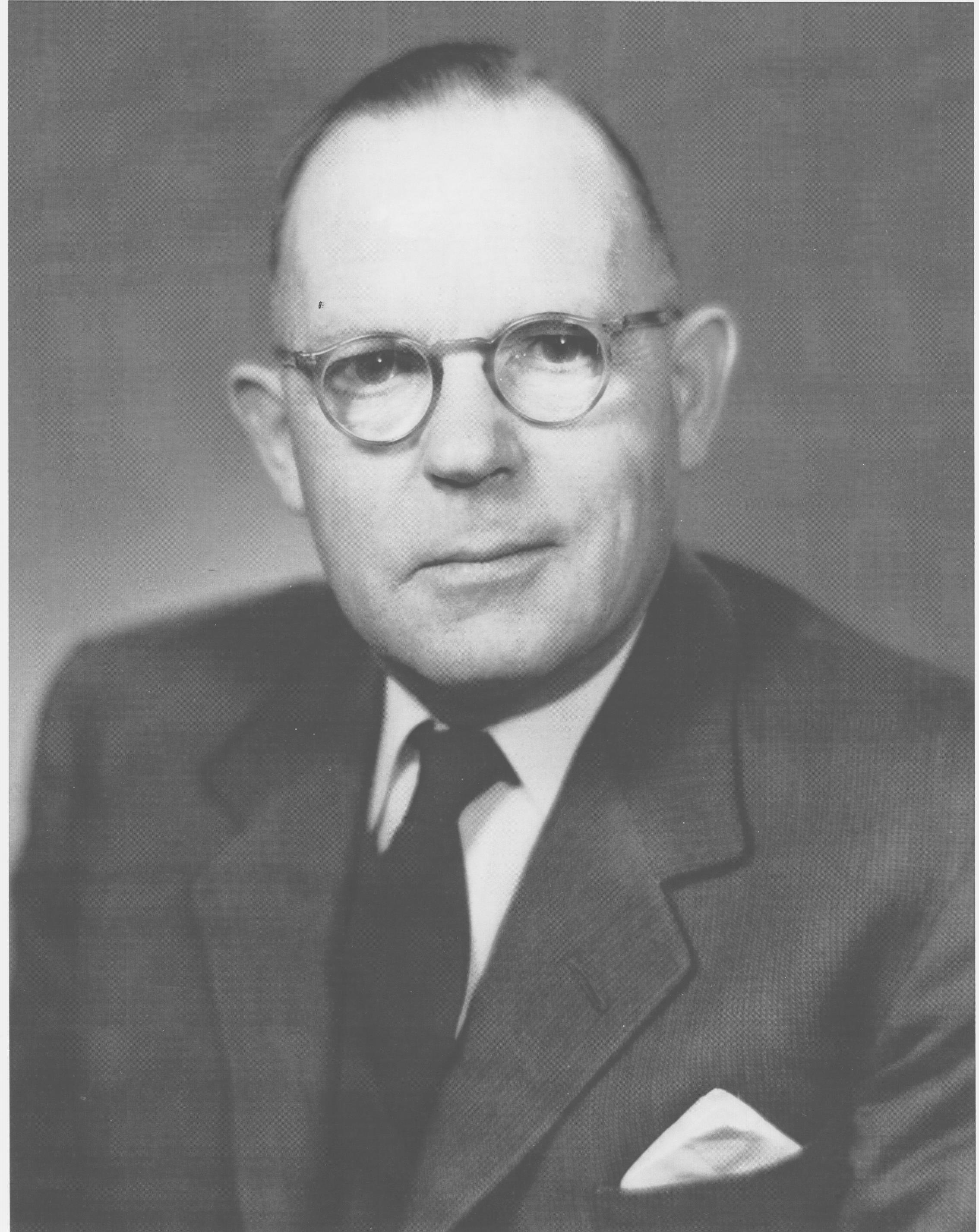

4th United States Ambassador to Jordan
- In office May 12, 1959 – March 18, 1961
- President: Dwight D. Eisenhower; John F. Kennedy
- Preceded by: Parker T. Hart
- Succeeded by: William B. Macomber Jr.

8th United States Ambassador to Afghanistan
- In office May 6, 1956 – February 3, 1959
- President: Dwight D. Eisenhower
- Preceded by: Angus I. Ward
- Succeeded by: Henry A. Byroade

United States Ambassador to Ecuador
- In office August 19, 1954 – April 6, 1956
- President: Dwight D. Eisenhower
- Preceded by: Paul C. Daniels
- Succeeded by: Christian M. Ravndal

Personal details
- Born: Sheldon Tibbetts Mills; August 13, 1904 Seattle, Washington, U.S.
- Died: July 15, 1988 (aged 83) Santa Barbara, California, U.S.
- Education: Reed College; Harvard University

Sheldon Tibbetts Mills (August 13, 1904 – July 15, 1988) was a United States diplomat, who served as a career Foreign Service officer of the U.S. Department of State from 1928 to 1961.

== Family ==
Mills was born on August 13, 1904, in Seattle, Washington and died on July 15, 1988, in Santa Barbara, California. Mills' parents were Harry Edward Mills, a Protestant minister and poet, best known for his book, "The Sod House in Heaven, and Other Poems," and Mary Brewster Tibbetts Mills, a direct descendant of Elder William Brewster who arrived in America on the Mayflower in 1620.

On January 23, 1932, Sheldon Mills married Francesca Dekum of Portland, Oregon, the daughter of Adolph Andrew Dekum and Linda Andrews Dekum. Adolph Dekum was in the hardware business. Linda Andrews Dekum was originally from Warren, Ohio, where her father, Francis Newell Andrews, was a prosperous merchant whose family had arrived in America in the 17th century.

Francesca Dekum's grandfather, Frank Dekum, was born in Bavaria, Germany and was a prominent 19th century fruit merchant, banker and real estate investor in Portland, Oregon.

Sheldon Mills and Francesca Mills were the parents of three daughters.

== Education ==
Sheldon Mills graduated from Reed College in Portland, Oregon with a B.A. degree in 1927. He then traveled to Washington, D.C., where he studied for the Foreign Service exams with Angus Crawford, who tutored 90 percent of the aspiring Foreign Service officers of that era. Sheldon Mills passed the exams and was commissioned as a Foreign Service Officer in December 1928. From 1939 to 1940 Sheldon Mills was detailed to Harvard University where he studied economics.

Francesca Dekum Mills attended Miss Catlan's School in Portland, Oregon and graduated from Reed College in 1929.

== Career ==
After Mills was appointed a Foreign Service officer in the Department of State in 1928, he began a diplomatic career that spanned 32 years.

His postings included Bolivia, Panama, Romania, Chile, India and Brazil. He also served as United States Ambassador to Ecuador (1954–1956); United States Ambassador to Afghanistan (1956–1959); and, finally, as United States Ambassador to Jordan from 1959 to 1961.

Mills developed a positive relationship with Afghanistan's King Mohammad Zahir which proved beneficial to both the U.S. and Afghanistan. The King returned to Afghanistan from forced exile in 2002 to become the ceremonial "father of the nation" after the Taliban retreat. During Sheldon Mills' time in Kabul, King Zahir Shah received economic development support from both the United States and the Soviet Union which was an unusual achievement during the Cold War when recipient countries were clients of one super power or the other.

In Jordan, Mills enjoyed a good personal interaction with King Hussein which enhanced the United States-Jordanian relationship. According to Nigel Ashton's, "King Hussein of Jordan, a Political Life," (page 83) the King told Ambassador Mills in early 1960 that, 'the Arab legend,' that Israel should be pushed into the sea should be abandoned, and that "It was time to put aside emotionalism and take steps toward a final settlement between Israel and the Arabs."

== Later life ==
After leaving the Foreign Service and retiring to Santa Barbara, California. Mills was an active member of the Channel City Club, the Cosmopolitan Club, the Council on Foreign Relations, the American Foreign Service Association and Diplomatic and Consular Officials, Retired. He was a frequent contributor of op-ed articles on foreign affairs to local newspapers.

Diplomatic posts
| Preceded by Paul C. Daniels | United States Ambassador to Ecuador; 1954–1956 | Succeeded by Christian M. Ravndal |
| Preceded by Angus I. Ward | United States Ambassador to Afghanistan; 1956–1959 | Succeeded by Henry A. Byroade |
