= George Robert Merrell =

American diplomat

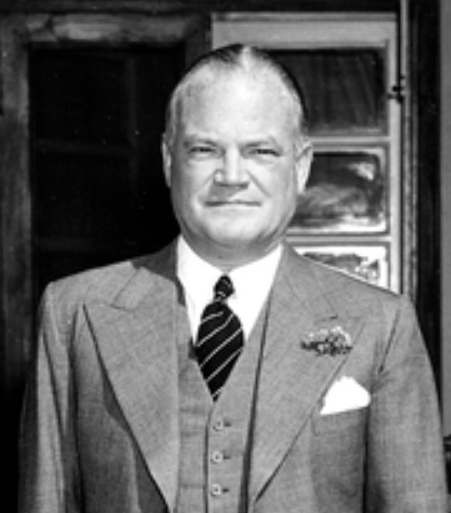
- George Robert Merrell in New Delhi ca. 1946

6th United States Ambassador to Afghanistan
- In office June 28, 1951 – May 3, 1952
- President: Harry Truman
- Preceded by: Louis G. Dreyfus
- Succeeded by: Angus I. Ward

United States Ambassador to Ethiopia
- In office June 28, 1949 – March 17, 1951
- President: Harry Truman
- Preceded by: Felix Cole
- Succeeded by: J. Rives Childs

Charge d’Affaires ad interim to Haiti
- In office March 1924 – October 1926
- Preceded by: James Clement Dunn (Charge d’Affaires ad interim)
- Succeeded by: Christian Gross (Charge d’Affaires ad interim)

Personal details
- Born: July 13, 1898 St. Louis, Missouri, U.S.
- Died: December 16, 1962 (aged 64) London, United Kingdom
- Spouse: Nathalie Bishop Choate
- Education: Cornell University

George Robert Merrell Jr. (July 13, 1898 – December 16, 1962) was an American diplomat who served as the United States Ambassador to Ethiopia and United States Ambassador to Afghanistan. During his diplomatic career he served in Haiti, China, India, and Afghanistan.

== Early life ==
George Robert Merrell Jr. was born in St. Louis, Missouri, on July 13, 1898. During World War I he served in the United States Army. He graduated from Soldan High School and graduated from Cornell University in 1921.

On January 18, 1936, Merrell married Nathalie Bishop Choate, but Choate later filed for divorce in 1939. She accused Merrell of cruelty and was given the divorce after an eight minute trial.

== Career ==
In 1921, Merrell became a diplomat for the United States. From March 1924 to October 26, he served as the Chargé d’Affaires ad interim to Haiti. In April 1935, Merrell became the First Secretary of the United States Legation in Peiping, China.

On April 26, 1941, Merrell was appointed to serve as the Consul in Calcutta, India. On September 20, he was promoted to consul general and October 25, he was appointed to simultaneously serve as the Consul General in Kabul, Afghanistan. In 1945, Merrell was appointed by President Franklin D. Roosevelt to serve as the United States Minister to India and was approved by the United States Senate on February 27.

On April 15, 1947, President Harry S. Truman appointed Merrell to replace Felix Cole as the Envoy Extraordinary and Minister Plenipotentiary. Henry F. Grady was appointed to succeed Merrell as the United States Ambassador to India. On May 14, the United States Senate approved his nomination and he presented his credentials on January 1, 1948. On June 28, 1949, he was promoted to Ambassador Extraordinary and Plenipotentiary and served until March 17, 1951.

On April 19, 1951, he was appointed to serve as the United States Ambassador to Afghanistan. He presented his credentials on June 28, 1951, and served until May 3, 1952.

== Later life ==
On December 16, 1962, Merrell died from after suffering a stroke in London, United Kingdom. He was visiting his sister Ruth, who was an assistant to David K. E. Bruce, the United States Ambassador to the United Kingdom.
