= List of ambassadors of the United States to Afghanistan =

Ambassador of the United States to Afghanistan
- Seal of the United States Department of State

- Flag of a United States ambassador

- Incumbent; Don Brown (chargé d'affaires) since July 28, 2025
- United States Department of State; Afghan Affairs Unit at U.S. Embassy Doha
- Reports to: United States Secretary of State
- Seat: Doha, Qatar
- Appointer: President of the United States; with advice and consent of the Senate
- Term length: At the pleasure of the president
- Inaugural holder: William H. Hornibrook (as Envoy Extraordinary and Minister Plenipotentiary)
- Formation: May 4, 1935 (original); December 17, 2001 (current form)
- Website: Official website

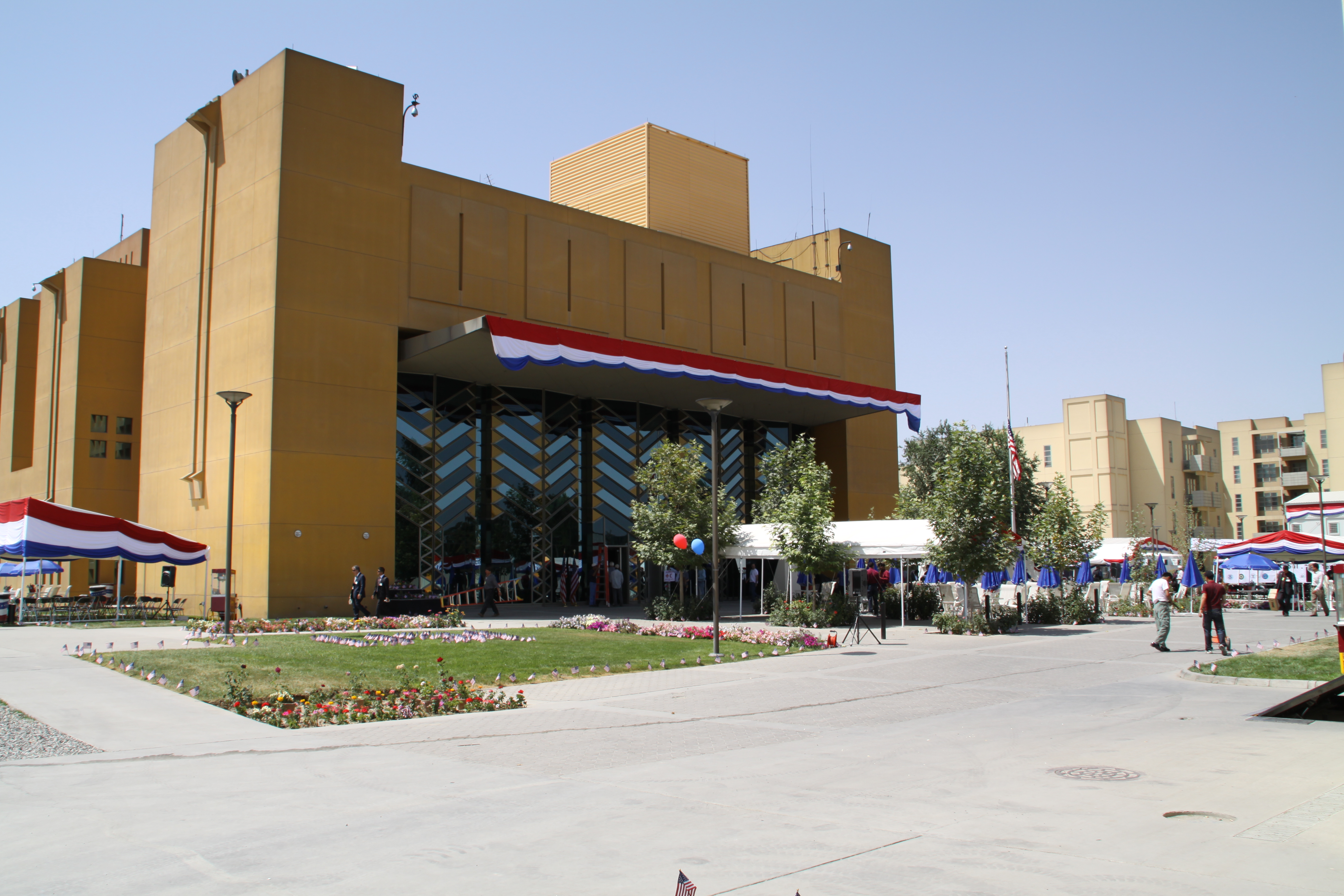
The U.S. Embassy in Kabul, 2010

The United States ambassador to Afghanistan is the official diplomatic representative of the United States to Afghanistan. In the wake of the 2021 fall of Kabul to the Taliban, the U.S. embassy in Kabul transferred operations to Doha, Qatar. Since December 31, 2021, the U.S. interests section at the Embassy of Qatar in Kabul has served as the protecting power for the U.S. in Afghanistan.

The United States recognized Afghanistan, then under the rule of King Amānullāh, on July 26, 1921. Diplomatic relations were established in 1935. The first ambassador appointed to Afghanistan was William H. Hornibrook, who was concurrently commissioned to Persia, as Iran was known then, and resided in Tehran. Until 1942, the U.S. ambassador to Persia/Iran was also the ambassador to Afghanistan. The U.S. legation at Kabul was established on June 6, 1942, with Charles W. Thayer as chargé d’affaires ad interim. Cornelius Van Hemert Engert presented his credentials to the government of Afghanistan on July 2, 1942, as the first envoy solely accredited to Afghanistan.

Ambassador Adolph Dubs was assassinated in a botched kidnapping attempt in 1979. For the next ten years, no ambassador was appointed; only a series of chargés d’affaires represented the U.S. in Kabul. The embassy at Kabul was closed on January 30, 1989, due to concerns that the new regime would not be able to maintain security and protect diplomats following the final departure of Soviet forces from the country.

Following the overthrow of the Taliban government, the U.S. liaison office in Kabul opened on December 17, 2001, with Ambassador James Dobbins serving as director. The United States recognized the Afghan Interim Administration on December 22, 2001, when it assumed the authority to represent Afghanistan in its external relations. The embassy reopened on January 17, 2002, with Ryan Crocker as chargé d’affaires a.i.

== Ambassadors and chiefs of mission ==
#	Name	Title	Appointed	Presented credentials	Terminated mission	Notes
1	William H. Hornibrook – Political appointee	Envoy Extraordinary and Minister Plenipotentiary	January 22, 1935	May 4, 1935	Left Tehran March 16, 1936	The names of the chargés heading the Afghanistan mission between Hornibrook’s departure in 1936 and the arrival of Dreyfus in 1941 have not been recorded.
2	Louis G. Dreyfus, Jr. – Career FSO	Envoy Extraordinary and Minister Plenipotentiary	February 16, 1940	May 19, 1941	Superseded by establishment of legation in Kabul, July 25, 1942	Legation Kabul was opened June 6, 1942 with Charles W. Thayer as Chargé d’Affaires ad interim.
3	Cornelius Van Hemert Engert – Career FSO	Envoy Extraordinary and Minister Plenipotentiary	May 2, 1942	July 2, 1942	Left post August 17, 1945	
4	Ely Palmer – Career FSO	Envoy Extraordinary and Minister Plenipotentiary	February 9, 1945	December 6, 1945	Promoted to Ambassador Extraordinary and Plenipotentiary	During Palmer’s tenure as envoy, the Legation was elevated to Embassy status on June 5, 1948, when Palmer presented his credentials to the Afghan government.
4	Ely Palmer – Career FSO	Ambassador Extraordinary and Plenipotentiary	May 6, 1948	June 5, 1948	Left post November 18, 1948	
5	Louis G. Dreyfus, Jr. – Career FSO	Ambassador Extraordinary and Plenipotentiary	April 21, 1949	August 16, 1949	Left post January 19, 1951	
6	George Robert Merrell – Career FSO	Ambassador Extraordinary and Plenipotentiary	April 19, 1951	June 28, 1951	Left post May 3, 1952	
7	Angus I. Ward – Career FSO	Ambassador Extraordinary and Plenipotentiary	June 27, 1952	November 8, 1952	Left post March 3, 1956	
8	Sheldon T. Mills – Career FSO	Ambassador Extraordinary and Plenipotentiary	March 28, 1956	May 6, 1956	Left post February 3, 1959	
9	Henry A. Byroade – Career FSO	Ambassador Extraordinary and Plenipotentiary	January 29, 1959	March 21, 1959	Left post January 19, 1962	
10	John M. Steeves – Career FSO	Ambassador Extraordinary and Plenipotentiary	February 7, 1962	March 20, 1962	Left post July 21, 1966	
11	Robert G. Neumann – Political appointee	Ambassador Extraordinary and Plenipotentiary	November 3, 1966	February 19, 1967	Left post September 10, 1973	
12	Theodore L. Eliot, Jr. – Career FSO	Ambassador Extraordinary and Plenipotentiary	September 20, 1973	November 21, 1973	Left post June 14, 1978	
13	Adolph Dubs – Career FSO	Ambassador Extraordinary and Plenipotentiary	June 27, 1978	July 12, 1978	Assassinated at post February 14, 1979	
-	J. Bruce Amstutz – Career FSO	Chargé d’Affaires a.i.		February 14, 1979	February 1980	
-	Hawthorne Q. Mills – Career FSO	Chargé d’Affaires a.i.		February 1980	January 1982	
-	Charles Franklin Dunbar – Career FSO	Chargé d’Affaires a.i.		January 1982	June 1983	
-	Edward Hurwitz – Career FSO	Chargé d’Affaires a.i.		June 1983	March 1986	
-	James Maurice Ealum	Chargé d’Affaires a.i.		March 1986	September 1987	
-	Jon D. Glassman	Chargé d’Affaires a.i.		September 1987	January 30, 1989	
	Peter Tomsen served as Special Envoy to Afghanistan (to the Northern Alliance) 1989–1992. The U.S. embassy in Kabul closed in January 1989. The embassy reopened on January 17, 2002.					
-	James F. Dobbins – Career FSO	Ambassador (in charge of reestablishing U.S. Embassy)		December 17, 2001	January 2, 2002	
-	Ryan Crocker – Career FSO	Chargé d’Affaires a.i.	January 2, 2002	Unknown	April 3, 2002	
14	Robert Finn – Career FSO	Ambassador Extraordinary and Plenipotentiary	March 21, 2002	April 3, 2002	Left post August 1, 2004	
15	Zalmay Khalilzad – Political appointee	Ambassador Extraordinary and Plenipotentiary	August 17, 2004	September 28, 2004	Left post June 20, 2005	
16	Ronald E. Neumann – Career FSO	Ambassador Extraordinary and Plenipotentiary	June 27, 2005	August 1, 2005	Left post April 10, 2007	
17	William Braucher Wood – Career FSO	Ambassador Extraordinary and Plenipotentiary	March 28, 2007	April 16, 2007	April 9, 2009	
18	Karl Eikenberry – Political appointee	Ambassador Extraordinary and Plenipotentiary	April 3, 2009	May 21, 2009	July 25, 2011	
19	Ryan Crocker – Career FSO	Ambassador Extraordinary and Plenipotentiary	July 7, 2011	July 25, 2011	July 13, 2012	
20	James B. Cunningham - Career FSO	Ambassador Extraordinary and Plenipotentiary	August 2012, Sworn in as ambassador August 12, 2012.	August 13, 2012	December 7, 2014	
21	P. Michael McKinley - Career FSO	Ambassador Extraordinary and Plenipotentiary	December 2014	January 6, 2015	December 18, 2016	
-	Hugo Llorens	Career Ambassador and Special Chargé d’Affaires		December 19, 2016	November 17, 2017	
22	John R. Bass	Ambassador Extraordinary and Plenipotentiary	September 28, 2017	December 12, 2017	January 6, 2020	
-	Ross L. Wilson	Chargé d’Affaires	January 18, 2020		August 31, 2021	
	The U.S. Embassy in Kabul transferred operations to Doha, Qatar, on August 31, 2021, following the fall of Kabul to the Taliban. Since December 31, the U.S. Interests Section at the Embassy of Qatar in Kabul has served as the protecting power for the U.S. in Afghanistan.					
-	Ian McCary	Chargé d’Affaires	August 31, 2021		July 31, 2022	
-	Karen B. Decker	Chargé d’Affaires	August 1, 2022		July 28, 2025	
-	Don Brown	Chargé d’Affaires	July 28, 2025		Present	

== See also ==
- Embassy of the United States, Kabul
- Afghanistan–United States relations
- Ambassadors of the United States
- Embassy of Afghanistan, Washington, D.C.
- Ambassadors of Afghanistan to the United States
