= Angus I. Ward =

American diplomat

7th United States Ambassador to Afghanistan
- In office June 27, 1952 – November 8, 1952
- Preceded by: George Robert Merrell
- Succeeded by: Sheldon T. Mills

Personal details
- Born: 1893
- Died: 1969 (aged 75–76)

Angus Ivan Ward (1893–1969) was an American Career Foreign Service Officer who served as Ambassador Extraordinary and Plenipotentiary to Afghanistan from 1952 to 1956.

== Career ==
Ward was Consul to China during the latter half of the Chinese Civil War, when Mao Zedong and the People's Liberation Army were involved in a civil war with the Chinese Nationalists. When they reached Mukden (now Shenyang) in 1948, Mao demanded that Ward turn over the consulate's radio transmitter. Ward refused and on November 20, 1948, PLA troops surrounded the consulate. Ward and his 21 staff members were under house arrest with no communication, water, and electricity, isolating them for months. The consulate was ordered closed by the American government but the Chinese government charged the consulate as serving as a base for espionage so Ward was unable to close it down. Ward was arrested after Harry S. Truman refused to recognize the Mao government and he and his staff were accused of inciting a riot outside the consulate in October 1949. On November 24, 1949, Ward and his staff were ordered to be deported and they left in December 1949.
