= Herschel Johnson =

American diplomat

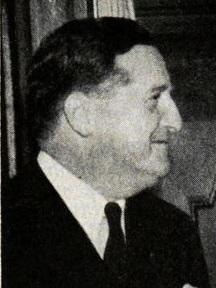

United States Ambassador to Brazil
- In office July 22, 1948 – May 27, 1953
- President: Harry S. Truman; Dwight D. Eisenhower
- Preceded by: William D. Pawley
- Succeeded by: James S. Kemper

United States Ambassador to the United Nations
- Acting
- In office June 3, 1946 – January 14, 1947
- President: Harry S. Truman
- Preceded by: Edward Stettinius Jr.
- Succeeded by: Warren Austin

United States Ambassador to Sweden
- In office December 12, 1941 – April 28, 1946
- President: Franklin D. Roosevelt; Harry S. Truman
- Preceded by: Frederick A. Sterling
- Succeeded by: Louis G. Dreyfus Jr.

Personal details
- Born: Herschel Vespasian Johnson; May 3, 1894 Atlanta, Georgia, U.S.
- Died: April 16, 1966 (aged 71) Charlotte, North Carolina, U.S.
- Party: Democratic
- Education: University of North Carolina, Chapel Hill (BA); Harvard University (JD)

Herschel Vespasian Johnson (May 3, 1894 – April 16, 1966) was a U.S. diplomat from North Carolina. He was the great-grandson of Governor Herschel Vespasian Johnson. He served as a U.S. Foreign Service Officer from 1921 to 1953, and his career included posts in Europe, Latin America, and the United Nations.

He served as Envoy Extraordinary and Minister Plenipotentiary to Sweden between 12 December 1941 and 28 April 1946. Thereafter, he served as the acting US ambassador to the United Nations between 1946 and 1947. In 1948, he was appointed Ambassador Extraordinary and Plenipotentiary to Brazil.

During his time in Sweden, he made humanitarian efforts to save civilian lives and was in touch with Raoul Wallenberg.

He was a vocal proponent of the 1947 Palestine Partition Plan. The outcome of the UN vote is attributed to his collaboration with Andrei A. Gromyko, otherwise Johnson's political opponent. They both stood together on this issue and urged the General Assembly not to delay its decision but to vote for partition at once, opposing last-minute efforts of Arab delegations to effect a compromise.

Diplomatic posts
Preceded by Frederick A. Sterling	United States Ambassador to Sweden; 1941–1946	Succeeded by Louis G. Dreyfus Jr.
Preceded by Edward Stettinius Jr.	United States Ambassador to the United Nations; Acting; 1946–1947	Succeeded by Warren Austin
Preceded by William D. Pawley	United States Ambassador to Brazil; 1947–1953	Succeeded by James S. Kemper
