= Louis G. Dreyfus =

American diplomat

Louis G. Dreyfus Jr.
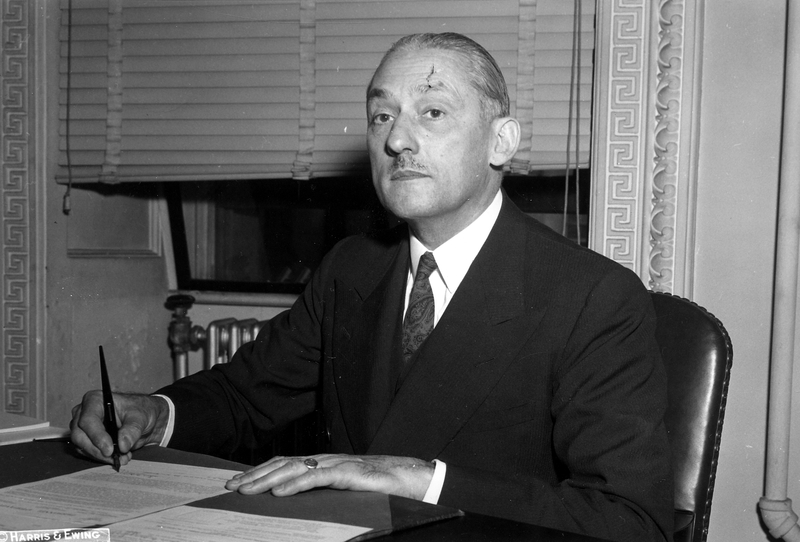

5th United States Ambassador to Afghanistan
- In office August 16, 1949 – January 19, 1951
- President: Harry S. Truman
- Preceded by: Ely Palmer
- Succeeded by: George Robert Merrell

United States Minister to Sweden
- In office January 3, 1947 – October 6, 1947
- President: Harry S. Truman
- Preceded by: Herschel Johnson
- Succeeded by: H. Freeman Matthews

3rd United States Minister to Iceland
- In office June 14, 1944 – January 21, 1946
- President: Franklin D. Roosevelt; Harry S. Truman
- Preceded by: Leland B. Morris
- Succeeded by: Richard P. Butrick

2nd United States Minister to Afghanistan
- In office May 19, 1941 – July 2, 1942
- President: Franklin D. Roosevelt
- Preceded by: William H. Hornibrook
- Succeeded by: Cornelius Engert

10th United States Minister to Iran
- In office December 18, 1940 – December 12, 1943
- President: Franklin D. Roosevelt
- Preceded by: William H. Hornibrook (1936)
- Succeeded by: Leland B. Morris (as Ambassador)

Personal details
- Born: Louis Goethe Dreyfus, Jr. 1889
- Died: May 19, 1973 (aged 83) Santa Barbara, California
- Spouse: Grace Hawes (m. 1917–1973)
- Education: Yale University
- Occupation: Diplomat

Louis Goethe Dreyfus Jr. (November 23, 1889 – May 19, 1973) was an American diplomat.

As an experienced diplomat, he served twice as United States ambassador to Afghanistan, at differing times; his career at the Department of State ultimately lasted more than 40 years.

== Career ==
After his graduation from Yale University in 1910, he entered the Foreign Service in 1911. His older brother Emanuel died in 1913 of sarcoma.

After postings in Berlin, Paris, and South America, he was nominated as the American ambassador to Iran in 1939.

Because of an incident involving the Iranian minister (who was caught speeding in Elkton, Maryland), and the Elkton police, along with the subsequent newspaper coverage, the Iranian government recalled their minister in early 1936. The incident caused a diplomatic rupture: all consular matters were transacted through chargés d'affaires until 1939, at which time Dreyfus was nominated.

While in Iran, Dreyfus reported on the Anglo-Soviet invasion of Iran to the State Department.

Dreyfus also served as Minister to Iceland, both before and after it became a republic; and Minister to Sweden after World War II.

He also served as the acting Chief of the Foreign Service Inspection Corps (what later became the Inspector General of the Department of State) from 1947 to 1948, before finally returning to Afghanistan as the United States ambassador from 1949 to 1951, when he was succeeded by George R. Merrell.

== Later life ==
After he retired from the State Department in 1951, he lived in Santa Barbara, California, until his death on May 19, 1973.

Diplomatic posts
Preceded by William H. Hornibrook in 1936	United States Minister to Iran; 1940-1943	Succeeded by Leland B. Morris (as Ambassador)
Preceded by William H. Hornibrook	United States Minister to Afghanistan; 1941-1942	Succeeded by Cornelius Van Hemert Engert
Preceded by Leland B. Morris	United States Minister to Iceland; 1944-1946	Succeeded by Richard P. Butrick
Preceded by Herschel Johnson	United States Minister to Sweden; January 1947-October 1947	Succeeded by H. Freeman Matthews
Preceded by Ely Palmer	United States Ambassador to Afghanistan; 1949-1951	Succeeded by George Robert Merrell
