= Theodore L. Eliot Jr. =

American diplomat (1928–2019)

Ted Eliot

9th Inspector General of the Department of State
- In office July 5, 1978 – October 16, 1978
- President: Jimmy Carter
- Preceded by: Robert M. Sayre
- Succeeded by: Robert C. Brewster

12th United States Ambassador to Afghanistan
- In office November 21, 1973 – June 14, 1978
- President: Richard Nixon; Gerald Ford; Jimmy Carter
- Preceded by: Robert G. Neumann
- Succeeded by: Adolph Dubs

4th Executive Secretary of the Department of State
- In office August 10, 1969 – September 26, 1973
- President: Richard Nixon
- Preceded by: Benjamin H. Read
- Succeeded by: Thomas R. Pickering

Personal details
- Born: Theodore Lyman Eliot Jr. January 24, 1928 Boston, Massachusetts, U.S.
- Died: August 8, 2019 (aged 91) Sonoma, California, U.S.
- Education: Harvard University (BA, MPA)

Theodore Lyman Eliot Jr. (January 24, 1928 – August 8, 2019) was an American diplomat who served as the U.S. Ambassador to Afghanistan from 1973 to 1978. He was a member of the American Academy of Diplomacy and Boston's Eliot family.

Eliot graduated from Harvard College in 1948 and received a Master of Public Administration from Harvard Kennedy School in 1956. He also served as Dean of the Fletcher School of Law and Diplomacy at Tufts University and as Secretary General for the United States of the Bilderberg Meetings from 1981 to October 1993.

Diplomatic posts
Preceded by Robert G. Neumann	United States Ambassador to Afghanistan; 1973–1978	Succeeded by Adolph Dubs
