= Ely Palmer =

American diplomat

Ely E. Palmer

4th United States Ambassador to Afghanistan
- In office February 9, 1945 – November 18, 1948
- President: Harry S. Truman
- Preceded by: Cornelius Van Hemert Engert
- Succeeded by: Louis G. Dreyfus

Personal details
- Born: Ely Eliot Palmer; November 29, 1887 Providence, Rhode Island
- Died: August 12, 1977 (aged 89) San Bernardino, California
- Citizenship: United States
- Spouse: Eno Ham Johnson (m. 1913; died 1961)
- Education: Brown University (A.B.); George Washington University (M.Dip.); University of Paris
- Profession: Diplomat

Ely Eliot Palmer (November 29, 1887 – August 12, 1977) was an American diplomat who served as the first United States Ambassador to Afghanistan in 1948. He later served on the United Nations Conciliation Commission as its chairman.

== Early life and education ==
Born in Providence, Rhode Island, on November 29, 1887, Palmer studied at Brown University, where he received his bachelor's degree in 1907; and at George Washington University, which awarded him a master's in diplomacy in 1909 (which, as he would later note, is no longer awarded).

Palmer later studied at the University of Paris.

== Career ==
In December 1910, Palmer joined the United States consular service as a consular assistant, and was later posted to Mexico City and Bucharest. With the establishment of the United States Foreign Service in 1924, pursuant to the Rogers Act, Palmer became one of the original class of foreign service officers; he was thereafter sent to Madrid, Paris, Jerusalem (1933–1935), and Sydney.

From Sydney, Palmer was posted to Afghanistan, in 1945. He proceeded to serve as the United States minister to Afghanistan, from 1945 to 1948; thus, upon the elevation of the legation to an embassy, he became the first United States Ambassador to Afghanistan, which lasted for a few months. Like President Harry S. Truman, who nominated him, Palmer found Afghanistan to be "a fascinating country". His successor, Louis G. Dreyfus, took office in 1949.

Following his time in Afghanistan, Palmer succeeded Paul A. Porter as the representative of the United States on the United Nations Conciliation Commission, in October 1949. After President Harry S. Truman approved his appointment in November, Palmer began to work within the week. During the course of his appointment, Palmer met with diplomats and stakeholders to try to find a solution for the Arab–Israeli conflict.

He also served as the chairman of the commission, starting in January 1950. Amidst a diplomatic impasse, he had to convince French diplomat Claude Bréart de Boisanger in matters regarding remuneration for Palestinian refugees, a position rejected by Dean Acheson; ultimately, even the study of possible compensation was tabled in fanciful hopes of more negotiation.

However, Palmer considered the question of compensation to be the most pressing matter, and many of his actions as chairman would attempt to resolve this issue. Nonetheless, it became clear to both the Israelis and the Arab League, (as James Grover McDonald noted), that the commission was rather ineffective, and disliked by both sides.

Despite the warnings of John Blandford Jr., a conference in Paris was organized in an attempt to facilitate peace negotiations and to investigate the possibility of compensation. Held from September 1951 to November 1951, it failed to produce any progress, in either monies or peace. Lacking support from his superiors, Palmer's term as the American representative on the Commission proved to be rather ineffectual; and his work proved to be for naught.

Under the Foreign Service Act of 1946, career diplomats of certain prominence could retire, but only at the rank of Career Minister. So, Palmer retired from the Foreign Service, at the rank of Career Minister, on July 31, 1952. At that point, he went to live on his ranch in California.

== Personal life ==
Palmer married Mrs. Eno Ham Johnson, in Paris, June 1913; His Canadian-born wife would follow him from posting to posting. She predeceased him in 1961.

Their son George went into the Foreign Service as well: George Palmer served in Spain, Panama, Canada, and Mexico. George also predeceased Palmer, in 1976.

Both before and after retiring, Palmer was known for his acquaintance with Eugene Ormandy. Throughout his career, he collected autographs.

Ely Eliot Palmer died on August 12, 1977, in San Bernardino, California.

Diplomatic posts
Preceded by Cornelius Van Hemert Engert	United States Minister to Afghanistan; 1945-1948	Promoted to Ambassador
New title	United States Ambassador to Afghanistan; June 1948-November 1948	Succeeded by Louis G. Dreyfus
