= Charles C. Eberhardt =

American diplomat

United States Minister to Costa Rica
- In office March 14, 1930 – September 24, 1933
- President: Herbert Hoover; Franklin D. Roosevelt
- Preceded by: Roy Tasco Davis
- Succeeded by: Leo R. Sack

United States Minister to Nicaragua
- In office August 7, 1925 – May 10, 1929
- President: Calvin Coolidge; Herbert Hoover
- Preceded by: John Edward Ramer
- Succeeded by: Matthew Elting Hanna

Personal details
- Born: July 27, 1871 Salina, Kansas, U.S.
- Died: February 22, 1965 (aged 93) Fort Smith, Arkansas, U.S.
- Profession: Diplomat

Charles Christopher Eberhardt (July 27, 1871 – February 22, 1965) was an American diplomat who served as ambassador to Costa Rica.

== Biography ==
Charles Christopher Eberhardt was an American diplomat who was born in Salina, Kansas, on July 27, 1871. Eberhardt was educated in the local public schools before going to Wesleyan University. Eberhardt was a Republican with varied business interests, including lumber, insurance and oil, prior to serving in the diplomatic corps. He died February 22, 1965, in Fort Smith, Arkansas, and is buried in Gypsum Hill Cemetery in Salina, Kansas.

== Diplomatic career ==
Eberhardt's most senior positions were between 1925 and 1933. During his early diplomatic career Eberhardt had served as a chargé d'affaires at various postings before he was promoted to minister to Nicaragua March 12, 1925. He left this post on May 10, 1929.

Following this, Eberhardt then went on to become the minister to Costa Rica on January 9, 1930 where he remained until September 24, 1933.

Earlier positions included:

- Clerk in the American Embassy in Mexico City, 1903
- U.S. Vice & Deputy Consul General in Mexico City, 1904-06
- U.S. Consul in Iquitos, 1906-08
- U.S. Consul in Barranquilla, 1908-10
- U.S. Consul General at Large, 1910–18, 1919-24
- was assigned as U.S. Consul General in Rio de Janeiro 1918-19, though he did not go
- U.S. Consul General at Large for Eastern Europe 1919
- U.S. Consul General for Eastern Europe 1922-25
