= List of ambassadors of the United States to Brazil =

Ambassador of the United States to Brazil
- Seal of the United States Department of State

- Flag of a United States ambassador

- Incumbent; Kimberly Kelly; Chargé d'Affaires ad interim since July 6, 2026
- Nominator: The president of the United States
- Appointer: The president; with Senate advice and consent
- Inaugural holder: Condy Raguet as Chargé d'Affaires
- Formation: October 29, 1825
- Website: U.S. Embassy - Brazil

The following is a list of ambassadors of the United States, or other chiefs of mission, to Brazil. The title given by the United States State Department to this position is currently Ambassador Extraordinary and Minister Plenipotentiary.

== List ==
Representative	Title	Presentation of credentials	Termination of mission	Appointed by
Condy Raguet	Chargé d'Affaires	October 29, 1825	April 16, 1827	John Quincy Adams
William Tudor	Chargé d'Affaires	June 25, 1828	March 9, 1830	John Quincy Adams
Ethan A. Brown	Chargé d'Affaires	February 18, 1831	April 11, 1834	Andrew Jackson
William Hunter	Chargé d'Affaires	January 7, 1835	January 1, 1842	Andrew Jackson
William Hunter	Envoy Extraordinary and Minister Plenipotentiary	January 1, 1842	December 9, 1843	John Tyler
George H. Proffit	Envoy Extraordinary and Minister Plenipotentiary	December 11, 1843	August 10, 1844	John Tyler
Henry A. Wise	Envoy Extraordinary and Minister Plenipotentiary	August 10, 1844	August 28, 1847	John Tyler
David Tod	Envoy Extraordinary and Minister Plenipotentiary	August 28, 1847	August 9, 1851	James K. Polk
Robert C. Schenck	Envoy Extraordinary and Minister Plenipotentiary	August 9, 1851	October 8, 1853	Millard Fillmore
William Trousdale	Envoy Extraordinary and Minister Plenipotentiary	October 8, 1853	December 5, 1857	Franklin Pierce
Richard K. Meade	Envoy Extraordinary and Minister Plenipotentiary	December 5, 1857	July 9, 1861	James Buchanan
James Watson Webb	Envoy Extraordinary and Minister Plenipotentiary	October 21, 1861	May 26, 1869	Abraham Lincoln
James Monroe	Chargé d'Affaires ad interim	1869	1869	Ulysses S. Grant
Henry T. Blow	Envoy Extraordinary and Minister Plenipotentiary	August 28, 1869	November 6, 1870	Ulysses S. Grant
James R. Partridge	Envoy Extraordinary and Minister Plenipotentiary	July 31, 1871	June 11, 1877	Ulysses S. Grant
Henry W. Hilliard	Envoy Extraordinary and Minister Plenipotentiary	October 23, 1877	June 15, 1881	Rutherford B. Hayes
Thomas A. Osborn	Envoy Extraordinary and Minister Plenipotentiary	December 17, 1881	July 11, 1885	James Garfield
Thomas J. Jarvis	Envoy Extraordinary and Minister Plenipotentiary	July 11, 1885	November 19, 1888	Grover Cleveland
Robert Adams, Jr.	Envoy Extraordinary and Minister Plenipotentiary	July 20, 1889	March 1, 1890	Benjamin Harrison
Edwin H. Conger	Envoy Extraordinary and Minister Plenipotentiary	December 19, 1890	September 9, 1893	Benjamin Harrison
Thomas L. Thompson	Envoy Extraordinary and Minister Plenipotentiary	September 9, 1893	July 17, 1897	Grover Cleveland
Edwin H. Conger	Envoy Extraordinary and Minister Plenipotentiary	August 9, 1897	February 6, 1898	William McKinley
Charles Page Bryan	Envoy Extraordinary and Minister Plenipotentiary	April 11, 1898	December 3, 1902	William McKinley
David E. Thompson	Envoy Extraordinary and Minister Plenipotentiary	April 1, 1903	March 16, 1905	Theodore Roosevelt
David E. Thompson	Ambassador Extraordinary and Plenipotentiary	March 16, 1905	November 3, 1905	Theodore Roosevelt
Lloyd C. Griscom	Ambassador Extraordinary and Plenipotentiary	June 6, 1906	January 2, 1907	Theodore Roosevelt
Irving Bedell Dudley	Ambassador Extraordinary and Plenipotentiary	April 1, 1907	September 16, 1911	Theodore Roosevelt
Edwin V. Morgan	Ambassador Extraordinary and Plenipotentiary	June 4, 1912	August 23, 1933	William H. Taft
Hugh S. Gibson	Ambassador Extraordinary and Plenipotentiary	August 23, 1933	December 3, 1936	Franklin D. Roosevelt
Jefferson Caffery	Ambassador Extraordinary and Plenipotentiary	August 17, 1937	September 17, 1944	Franklin D. Roosevelt
Adolf A. Berle, Jr.	Ambassador Extraordinary and Plenipotentiary	January 30, 1945	February 27, 1946	Franklin D. Roosevelt
William D. Pawley	Ambassador Extraordinary and Plenipotentiary	June 13, 1946	March 26, 1948	Harry S. Truman
Herschel Vespasian Johnson	Ambassador Extraordinary and Plenipotentiary	July 22, 1948	May 27, 1953	Harry S. Truman
James S. Kemper	Ambassador Extraordinary and Plenipotentiary	August 18, 1953	January 26, 1955	Dwight D. Eisenhower
James Clement Dunn	Ambassador Extraordinary and Plenipotentiary	March 11, 1955	July 4, 1956	Dwight D. Eisenhower
Ellis O. Briggs	Ambassador Extraordinary and Plenipotentiary	July 24, 1956	April 29, 1959	Dwight D. Eisenhower
John M. Cabot	Ambassador Extraordinary and Plenipotentiary	July 22, 1959	August 17, 1961	Dwight D. Eisenhower
Lincoln Gordon	Ambassador Extraordinary and Plenipotentiary	October 19, 1961	February 25, 1966	John F. Kennedy
John W. Tuthill	Ambassador Extraordinary and Plenipotentiary	June 30, 1966	January 9, 1969	Lyndon B. Johnson
Charles Burke Elbrick	Ambassador Extraordinary and Plenipotentiary	July 14, 1969	May 7, 1970	Richard Nixon
William M. Rountree	Ambassador Extraordinary and Plenipotentiary	November 16, 1970	May 30, 1973	Richard Nixon
John Hugh Crimmins	Ambassador Extraordinary and Plenipotentiary	August 13, 1973	February 25, 1978	Richard Nixon
Robert M. Sayre	Ambassador Extraordinary and Plenipotentiary	June 8, 1978	September 19, 1981	Jimmy Carter
Langhorne A. Motley	Ambassador Extraordinary and Plenipotentiary	October 6, 1981	July 6, 1983	Ronald Reagan
Diego C. Asencio	Ambassador Extraordinary and Plenipotentiary	December 20, 1983	February 28, 1986	Ronald Reagan
Harry W. Shlaudeman	Ambassador Extraordinary and Plenipotentiary	August 5, 1986	May 14, 1989	Ronald Reagan
Richard Huntington Melton	Ambassador Extraordinary and Plenipotentiary	December 12, 1989	December 16, 1993	George H. W. Bush
Melvyn Levitsky	Ambassador Extraordinary and Plenipotentiary	June 1, 1994	June 17, 1998	Bill Clinton
Anthony Stephen Harrington	Ambassador Extraordinary and Plenipotentiary	February 8, 2000	February 28, 2001	Bill Clinton
Cristobal R. Orozco	Chargé d'Affaires ad interim	February 28, 2001	April 23, 2002	George W. Bush
Donna J. Hrinak	Ambassador Extraordinary and Plenipotentiary	April 23, 2002	June 26, 2004	George W. Bush
John J. Danilovich	Ambassador Extraordinary and Plenipotentiary	September 2, 2004	November 7, 2005	George W. Bush
Philip T. Chicola	Chargé d'Affaires ad interim	November 7, 2005	August 2, 2006	George W. Bush
Clifford M. Sobel	Ambassador Extraordinary and Plenipotentiary	November 7, 2006	August 7, 2009	George W. Bush
Tom Shannon	Ambassador Extraordinary and Plenipotentiary	February 4, 2010	September 6, 2013	Barack Obama
Liliana Ayalde	Ambassador Extraordinary and Plenipotentiary	October 31, 2013	January 3, 2017	Barack Obama
P. Michael McKinley	Ambassador Extraordinary and Plenipotentiary	January 20, 2017	November 5, 2018	Donald Trump
William W. Popp	Chargé d'Affaires ad interim	November 5, 2018	March 30, 2020	Donald Trump
Todd C. Chapman	Ambassador Extraordinary and Plenipotentiary	March 30, 2020	July 23, 2021	Donald Trump
Douglas Koneff	Chargé d'Affaires ad interim	July 28, 2021	February 2, 2023	Joe Biden
Elizabeth Bagley	Ambassador Extraordinary and Plenipotentiary	February 3, 2023	January 20, 2025	Joe Biden
Gabriel Escobar	Chargé d'Affaires ad interim	January 21, 2025	July 6, 2026	Donald Trump
Kimberly Kelly	Chargé d'Affaires ad interim	July 6, 2026	Present	Donald Trump
Daniel Perez	Ambassador Extraordinary and Plenipotentiary	TBD		Donald Trump

== See also ==
- Embassy of the United States, Brasília
- Brazilian Ambassador to the United States
- Embassy of Brazil, Washington, D.C.
- Brazil – United States relations
- Foreign relations of Brazil
- Ambassadors of the United States
