= Leo R. Sack =

American journalist and diplomat

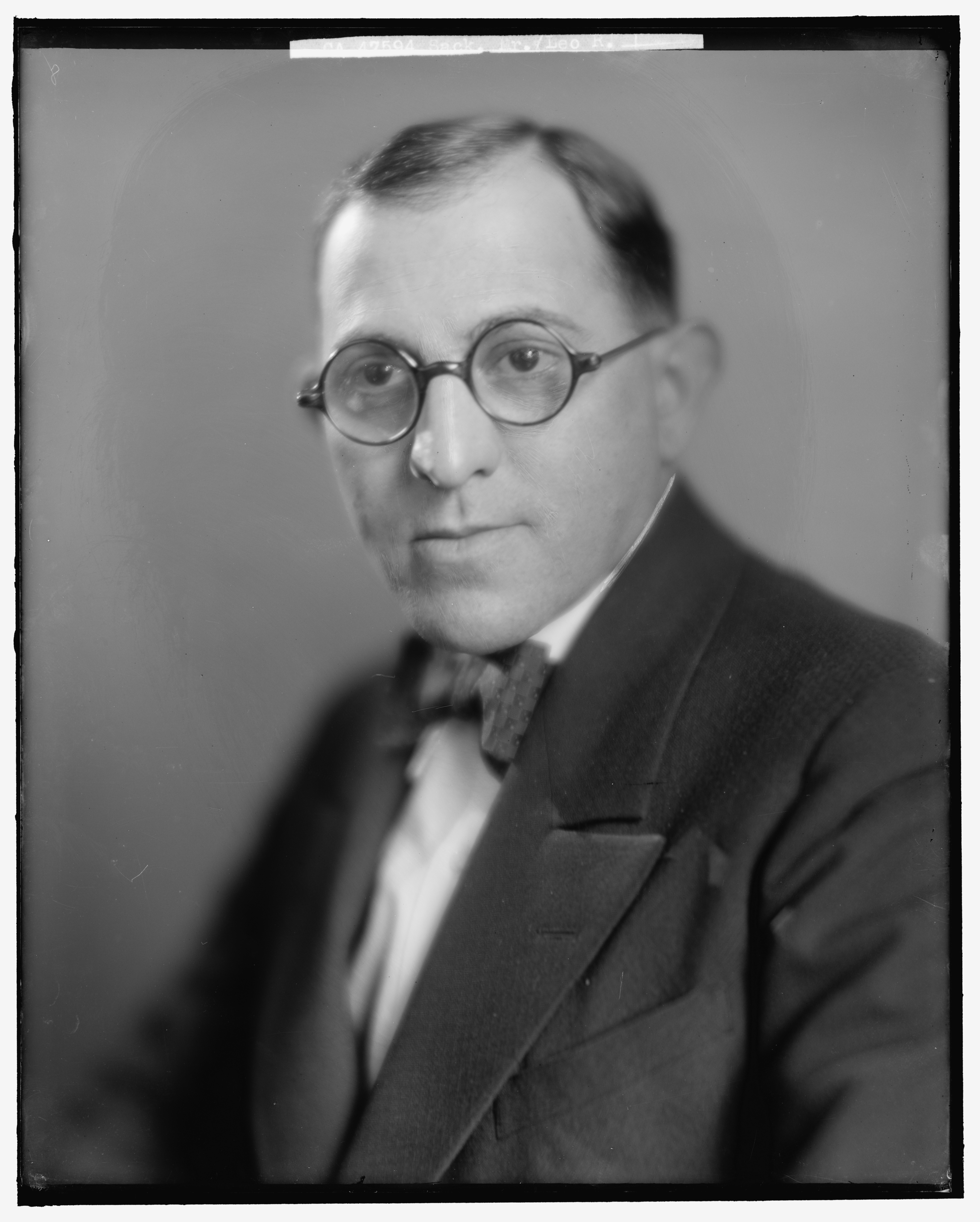

United States Minister to Costa Rica
- In office October 16, 1933 – January 10, 1937
- President: Franklin D. Roosevelt
- Preceded by: Charles C. Eberhardt
- Succeeded by: William H. Hornibrook

Personal details
- Born: July 9, 1889 Tupelo, Mississippi
- Died: April 16, 1956 (aged 66) Los Angeles, California
- Spouse: Regina
- Children: 1

Military service
- Allegiance: United States
- Branch/service: United States Army Air Service
- Rank: Major
- Battles/wars: World War I

Leo R. Sack (July 9, 1889 – April 15, 1956) was an American journalist and diplomat who served as ambassador to Costa Rica from 1933 to 1937.

Sack, from Mississippi, attended the University of Missouri, and later served in World War I in the United States Army Air Service. He was a journalist, both in the South and in Washington, D.C.

Sack served in the United States Diplomatic Service from September 1933 until he resigned his post in order to associate with Schenley. In 1934, during Costa Rica's Great Banana Strike, the United Fruit Company attempted to secure Sack's help in requesting United States intervention in Costa Rica to end the strike. Sack refused as he was not in favour of meddling in the affairs of other sovereign nations, and also didn't believe President Roosevelt would be in favour of such action, citing the Good Neighbor Policy. After his resignation, Edward Albright was appointed to replace him; but after Albright's death, William H. Hornibrook ultimately became the new minister. Later, he started a public relations firm.

He died in 1956 from a kidney ailment; his wife and his daughter survived him.
