= James S. Kemper =

American businessman, philanthropist, and diploma

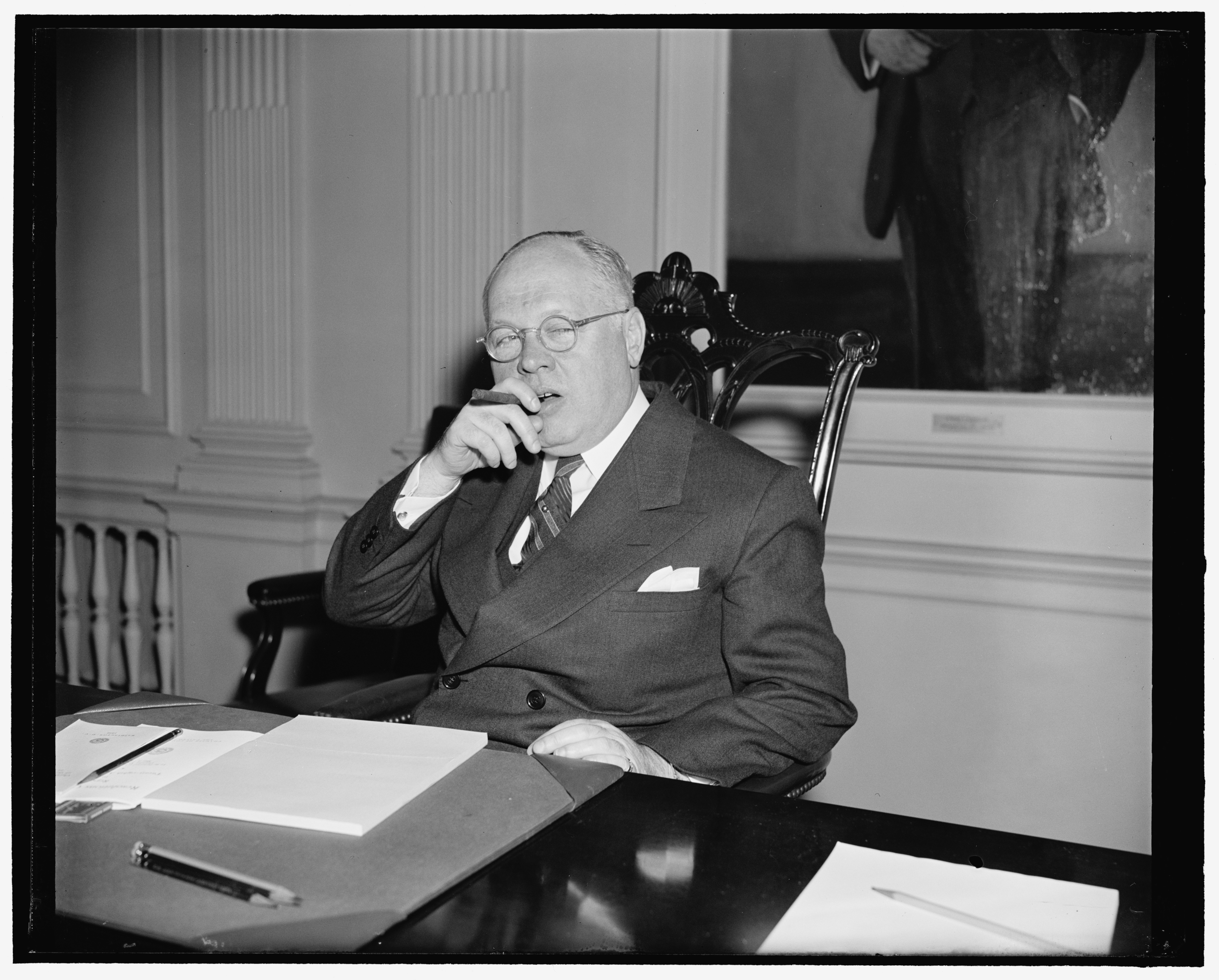

United States Ambassador to Brazil
- In office August 18, 1953 – January 26, 1955
- President: Dwight D. Eisenhower
- Preceded by: Herschel Johnson
- Succeeded by: James Clement Dunn

Personal details
- Born: James Scott Kemper; November 18, 1886; Van Wert, Ohio, U.S.
- Died: September 17, 1981 (aged 94); Chicago, Illinois, U.S.
- Resting place: Rosehill Cemetery
- Political party: Republican
- Education: Miami University

James Scott Kemper Sr. (November 18, 1886 - September 17, 1981) was a U.S. businessman, philanthropist, and diplomat who served as U.S. Ambassador to Brazil from 1953 to 1955 and as President of the U.S. Chamber of Commerce.

== Early life and education ==
Kemper was born in 1886 in Van Wert, Ohio, the son of Mary Jessie (Scott) and Hathaway Kemper. President William McKinley and U.S. Senator Mark Hanna were counted among guests at his family's Ohio home.

Kemper worked as a junior clerk after high school. He later graduated from Miami University and also attended Ripon College and Northwestern University. In the early years of his career, Kemper worked as a special agent for the Central Manufacturing District and as an executive for a variety of lumber mutual companies.

== Career ==
In 1910, Kemper moved to the Chicago area. In 1912, Kemper founded Lumbermens Mutual Casualty with an emphasis on workers compensation insurance. In the following decades, Kemper expanded the company's insurance portfolio and changed the firm's name to Kemper Insurance Companies.

Kemper also founded the Central Automobile Safety Committee and the Northwestern University Traffic Institute, and was influential in creating the Insurance Institute for Highway Safety. He co-founded the Hemispheric Insurance Conference and was the first chairman of the Council for Latin America. Kemper was also the chairman of the American Motorists Insurance Co. and a board member of S. C. Johnson & Son. Kemper resigned from his company in April 1979.

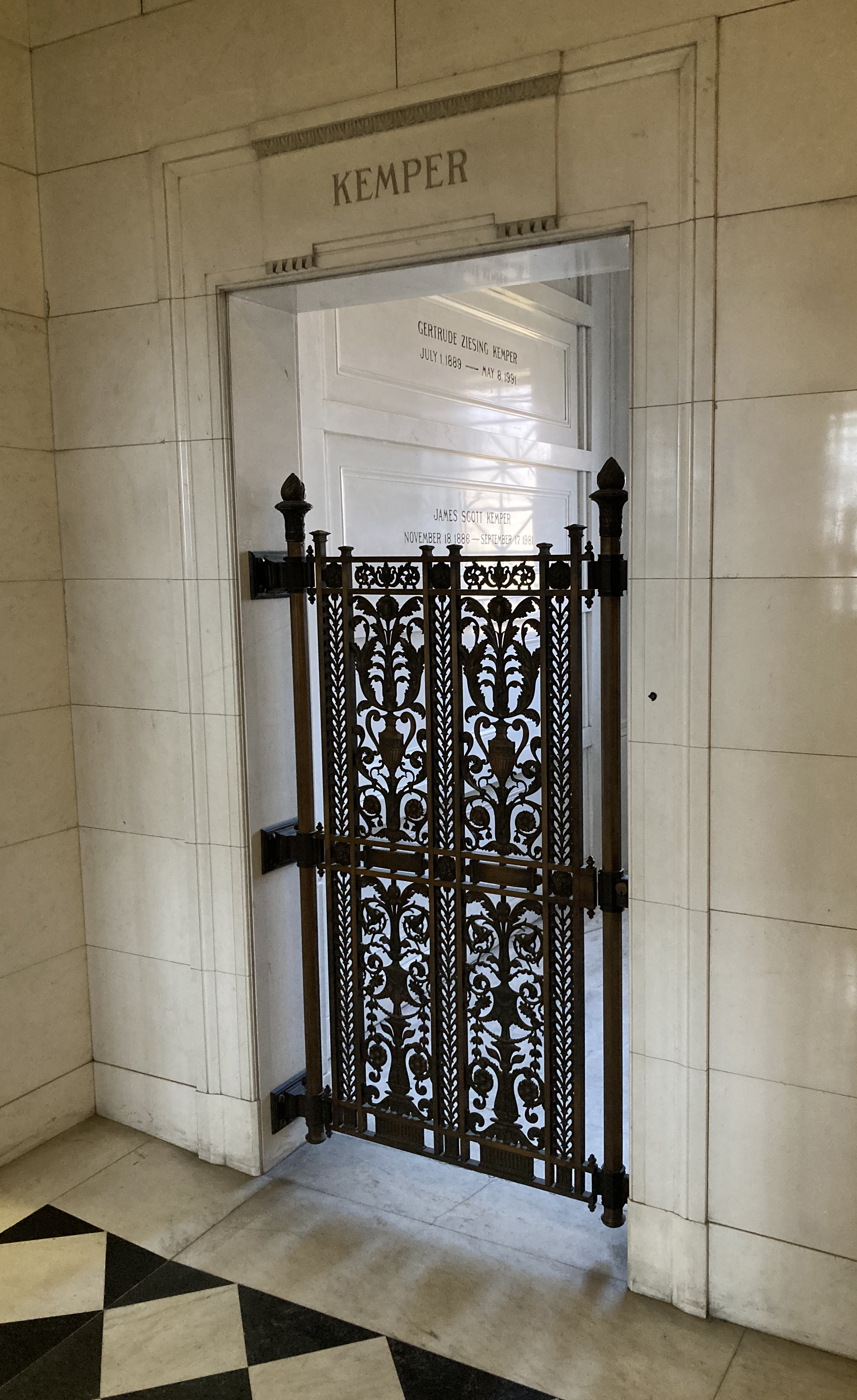
Kemper's grave at Rosehill Mausoleum

Kemper established The James S. Kemper Foundation in 1942 as a way to give back to the Chicago area and create awareness of the insurance industry as a viable career option. Kemper was involved in Republican politics, serving as an Illinois delegate to the Republican National Convention in 1936, 1940, 1944, 1948, and 1952, and as Treasurer of the Republican National Committee from 1944 until 1946.

Kemper was appointed by President of the United States Dwight Eisenhower to the position of Ambassador to Brazil in 1953 and confirmed by voice vote by the Senate. During his tenure, Kemper presided over a variety of mining and shale oil agreements between the United States and Brazil. Kemper announced his resignation from the post in late 1954 and served until January 1955. For the rest of his life and work in the private sector, Kemper liked to be addressed as "Mr. Ambassador."

Kemper was a personal friend and confidante of U.S. Presidents William Howard Taft, Herbert Hoover and Eisenhower. He was also an active supporter of Thomas E. Dewey for the Presidency in 1944 and 1948. He was also on close terms with President Richard Nixon and Senator Barry Goldwater.

He died at his home in Chicago on September 17, 1981, and was interred at Rosehill Mausoleum in Rosehill Cemetery.

== Awards ==
Kemper received the grand cross of the Order of the Southern Cross, Order of Merit in Ecuador, International Chicagoan of the Year, and Businessman of the Americas. In 1970, Kemper was inducted into the Insurance Hall of Fame.

== See also ==
- Kemper Corporation
