= William D. Pawley =

American businessman and ambassador

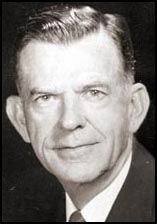

United States Ambassador to Peru
- In office July 20, 1945 – April 27, 1946
- President: Harry S. Truman
- Preceded by: John Campbell White
- Succeeded by: Prentice Cooper

United States Ambassador to Brazil
- In office June 13, 1946 – March 28, 1948
- President: Harry S. Truman
- Preceded by: Adolf A. Berle, Jr.
- Succeeded by: Herschel V. Johnson

Personal details
- Born: William Douglas Pawley; September 7, 1896 Florence, South Carolina
- Died: January 7, 1977 (aged 80) Miami Beach, Florida
- Party: Republican
- Spouse(s): Annie Hahr Dobbs (m. 1919; div. 1941) Edna Pawley
- Education: Gordon Military Academy
- Profession: Entrepreneur

William Douglas Pawley (September 7, 1896 — January 7, 1977) was a U.S. ambassador and noted businessman who was associated with the Flying Tigers American Volunteer Group (AVG) during World War II.

== Early life ==
William Douglas Pawley was born in Florence, South Carolina on September 7, 1896. His father was a wealthy businessman based in Cuba, and young Pawley attended private schools in both Havana and Santiago de Cuba. He spoke fluent Spanish. His father sold supplies to Guantanamo Naval Base. He later returned to the United States, where he studied at the Gordon Military Academy in Georgia.

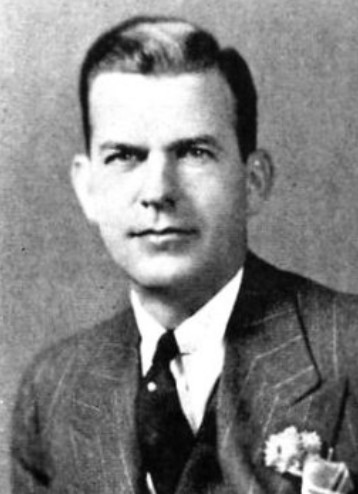
Pawley as a younger man

== Business career ==
In 1927, Pawley began a connection with Curtiss-Wright that would make him an extremely wealthy man. He was the company's sales rep for China. In 1928, he returned to Cuba to become president of Nacional Cubana de Aviación Curtiss, which was sold to Pan American Airlines in 1932. He then became president of Intercontinent Corporation in New York, evidently founded by Clement Keys, the former president of Curtiss. In 1933 he moved to China, where he became president of China National Aviation Corporation an airline running between Hong Kong and Shanghai. Pawley finally sold out to Pan Am again. He later assembled aircraft in partnership with the Chinese Nationalist government under the corporate name of Central Aircraft Manufacturing Company in Hangzhou, Wuhan, and finally Loiwing on the China-Burma border. (CAMCO was owned in partnership with the Chinese government, with the Pawley family interest represented by Intercontinent, which now served as a Pawley family holding company.)

=== World War II ===
In 1940, Hindustan Aircraft Limited was set up in India with Pawley providing the initial organization.

In 1941, with his brothers Edward and Eugene, he was involved with the organization and support of the 1st American Volunteer Group, popularly known as the Flying Tigers. The brothers established an assembly plant at Mingaladon airport outside Rangoon, Burma, where the AVG's Curtiss P-40 fighter aircraft were assembled, while an Intercontinent office in Rangoon (now Yangon) provided payroll and other housekeeping services to the group while it trained upcountry at Toungoo. Later, when Allied forces were driven out of lower Burma by the Japanese, the CAMCO factory and airfield across the border in Loiwing, China, served as a base for the AVG. When Loiwing in turn was captured by Japan in May 1942, Pawley moved his operation to India as a partner in Hindustan Aircraft Limited.

=== Later years ===
Pawley was appointed as U.S. Ambassador to Peru by Harry Truman in 1945. He was named U.S. Ambassador to Brazil in 1948. In 1949 he took over the Havana Trolley Company, and in 1950 he founded Autobuses Modernos in Havana. In 1951 Truman brought him back into the fold with a job as an advisor in the State Department on the region of East Asia. During the spring of that year he was sent to India by Truman to "open negotiations on certain strategic materials of great interest to our Government", such as manganese. In 1952 Pawley switched his party allegiances from Democrat to Republican, raising hundreds of thousands of dollars for Eisenhower's presidential campaign. In 1954 President Dwight Eisenhower appointed him to the Doolittle Commission, which evaluated the efficiency of the CIA's methods and operations.

Pawley played a role in Operation PBSuccess, a CIA plot to overthrow the Guatemalan government of Jacobo Arbenz in 1954 after Arbenz introduced reforms affecting the United Fruit Company. Pawley's role in the coup has been described as important but unofficial. He was brought in as a "civilian advisor" for the plotting of the coup by Allen Dulles, attending semi-weekly meetings of the State Department on the matter. He quickly became their liaison with the Pentagon. Pawley is thought to have served in Peru, Brazil, Panama, Guatemala, Cuba and Nicaragua between 1945 and 1960.

Over the years Pawley served as an unofficial advisor to President Eisenhower on Latin American policy. Eisenhower felt that Pawley was a zealot, but that he nonetheless made correct predictions and produced factual reports. On 9 December 1958, as the Cuban Revolution was in full-swing, Pawley met with the Cuban dictator Fulgencio Batista after being dispatched by the U.S. Department of State. Pawley attempted to convince Batista to step down and retire to Florida so he could be replaced by a military junta. Batista refused. After Castro took power Pawley's sugar businesses were confiscated by the government, like many others he subsequently got involved in the sugar industry in Florida, purchasing the Talisman Sugar Corporation in 1962, and involving himself in the Florida Sugar Cane League. He sold the company in 1964 but retained a 40% interest which he later sold to Gulf and Western.

In February 1960 he was once again sent to the Caribbean, this time alongside Senator George Smathers, in order to convince the Dominican Republic dictator, Rafael Trujillo, to step down. As Batista had done, Trujillo refused. Pawley had a personal relationship with Trujillo and owned Hotel Hamaca in Boca Chica. In September 1960 he testified at the Senate Committee on the Judiciary hearings on "the Communist threat to the United States through the Caribbean".

Pawley was virulently anti-Castro, he told a Miami reporter "Find me one man, just one man who can go it alone and get Castro, I'll pay anything, almost anything". He deeply regretted that Batista had been forced from power, stating "the deliberate overthrow of Batista by Wieland and Matthews, assisted by Rubottom, is almost as great a tragedy as the surrendering of China to the Communists by a similar group of Department of State officials...we will not see the end in cost of American lives and American resources for these tragic errors". In October 1959 Pawley began contact with a group of Cuban exiles who were attempting to undo the revolution by planning operations such as the sabotage of Cuba's sugar harvest. The CIA wiretapped Pawley's phone and he kept them abreast of his meetings with the exiles. Later on he worked closely with Allen Dulles on the planning and preparation of the Bay of Pigs Invasion and after its failure paid $125,000 in ransom for the release of three prisoners who had been captured. He attributed the invasion's failure to "leftist bureaucrats" in the State Department and President Kennedy's "betrayal". In 1963 Pawley sponsored a boat raid in a joint Mafia-Cuban exile effort to kidnap and take back to the United States Soviet missile technicians who were allegedly on the island. They would then be brought back to the United States and exhibited as proof that Russian missiles were in Cuba, despite Kennedy's assurances that there were none. The scheme failed.

== Personal life ==
On July 25, 1919, Pawley married Annie Hahr Dobbs of Marietta, Georgia. In 1925, the couple moved to Miami and then to Havana, Cuba, in 1928. They returned with their three children to Miami, where their youngest child was born. The Pawleys then moved to Shanghai, China, with the baby, leaving their other children in Miami Beach with family. Mrs. Pawley lived in China until 1938 with periodic trips back to Miami. They were divorced in 1941.

His final residence was in Miami Beach, Florida, where he died of a self-inflicted gunshot wound in the chest, in January 1977, because he suffered from a severe case of shingles. Gaeton Fonzi, of the House Select Committee on Assassinations (HSCA), had Pawley "near the top" of the list of people he intended to interview, but Pawley's suicide prevented this.

Diplomatic posts
Preceded by John Campbell White	United States Ambassador to Peru; July 20, 1945–April 27, 1946	Succeeded by Prentice Cooper
Preceded by Adolf A. Berle, Jr.	United States Ambassador to Brazil; June 13, 1946–March 26, 1948	Succeeded by Herschel V. Johnson
