= William B. Macomber Jr. =

American diplomat (1921–2003)

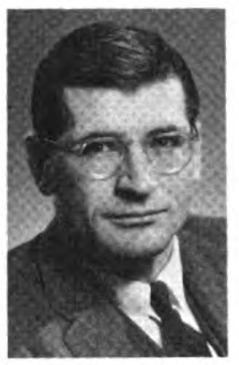

12th President of the Metropolitan Museum of Art
- In office 1978–1986
- Preceded by: C. Douglas Dillon
- Succeeded by: William H. Luers

United States Ambassador to Turkey
- In office May 16, 1973 – June 15, 1977
- President: Richard Nixon; Gerald Ford
- Preceded by: William J. Handley
- Succeeded by: Ronald I. Spiers

6th and 10th Assistant Secretary of State for Legislative Affairs
- In office March 7, 1967 – October 2, 1969
- Preceded by: Douglas MacArthur II
- Succeeded by: David Manker Abshire
- In office October 21, 1957 – February 27, 1961
- Preceded by: Robert C. Hill
- Succeeded by: Brooks Hays

United States Ambassador to Jordan
- In office April 5, 1961 – December 25, 1963
- President: John F. Kennedy
- Preceded by: Sheldon T. Mills
- Succeeded by: Robert G. Barnes

Personal details
- Born: William Butts Macomber Jr. March 28, 1921 Rochester, New York, U.S.
- Died: November 19, 2003 (aged 82) Nantucket, Massachusetts, U.S.
- Party: Republican
- Spouse: Phyllis Dorothy Bernau
- Education: Yale University (BA, MA); Harvard University (JD); University of Chicago (MA)

William Butts Macomber Jr. (March 28, 1921 – November 19, 2003) was an American diplomat who served in several positions in the United States Department of State. He was the 12th president of the Metropolitan Museum of Art.

== Early life and education ==
Macomber was born in Rochester, New York, on March 28, 1921. He attended Phillips Academy, graduating in 1940, and Yale University, graduating in 1943.

During World War II, he served in the United States Marine Corps, assigned to the Office of Strategic Services. After the war, he returned to Yale, receiving a master's degree in 1947. He next attended Harvard Law School, receiving his Juris Doctor degree in 1949. He then worked at Boston University as a lecturer in government, then moved on to the University of Chicago, receiving a second master's degree in 1951.

== Career ==
Macomber worked in the U.S. Government for decades, serving under five presidents. His positions were unstable, however, because he was always a political appointee and not a career Foreign Service officer.

Macomber joined the Central Intelligence Agency in 1951. Two years later, he moved to the United States Department of State as a special assistant of intelligence. In 1957, President Dwight D. Eisenhower nominated Macomber as assistant secretary of state for legislative affairs and served until February 27, 1961.

President John F. Kennedy then named Macomber as United States ambassador to Jordan and Macomber held this post from April 5, 1961, until December 25, 1963. In 1964, he became assistant administrator of the United States Agency for International Development.

Macomber returned to the office of assistant secretary of state for legislative affairs after he was named to the office by President Lyndon B. Johnson, and Macomber served in this office from March 7, 1967, through October 2, 1969.

Richard Nixon appointed Macomber deputy under secretary of state for management on September 26, 1969, and he served in this role from October 3, 1969, to April 4, 1973.

President Richard Nixon appointed him United States ambassador to Turkey on March 27, 1973. He presented his credentials on May 16, 1973, and served until he left his post on June 15, 1977. In 1975, he published a book, The Angels' Game: A Handbook of Modern Diplomacy. He retired from the United States Foreign Service in 1977.

=== Post-government life ===
In 1978, Macomber became the first full-time president of the Metropolitan Museum of Art. As president, he oversaw implementation of the MMA's master plan developed under his predecessor C. Douglas Dillon. He retired in 1986 due to the Met's mandatory retirement age of 65. In 1983, he was among the founders of the American Academy of Diplomacy.

In retirement, Macomber taught social studies and coached football at Nantucket High School.

== Personal life ==
Macomber was married to the Boston native and Simmons College graduate, Phyllis Dorothy Bernau (1924–2014) in c. 1964. They lived in a Fifth Avenue apartment and had a summer home in Nantucket, Massachusetts.

Macomber died of complications related to Parkinson's disease at his home in Nantucket, on November 19, 2003.

Government offices
Preceded by Robert C. Hill	Assistant Secretary of State for Legislative Affairs; October 21, 1957 – February 27, 1961	Succeeded by Brooks Hays
Diplomatic posts
Preceded by Sheldon T. Mills	United States Ambassador to Jordan; April 5, 1961 – December 25, 1963	Succeeded by Robert G. Barnes
Government offices
Preceded by Douglas MacArthur II	Assistant Secretary of State for Legislative Affairs; March 7, 1967 – October 2, 1969	Succeeded by David Manker Abshire
Diplomatic posts
Preceded by William J. Handley	United States Ambassador to Turkey; 1973 – 1977	Succeeded by Ronald I. Spiers
Cultural offices
Preceded by C. Douglas Dillon	President of the Metropolitan Museum of Art; 1978-1986	Succeeded by William H. Luers
