= William H. Hornibrook =

American diplomat (1884–1946)

United States Minister to Costa Rica
- In office September 2, 1937 – September 1, 1941
- President: Franklin D. Roosevelt
- Preceded by: Leo R. Sack
- Succeeded by: Arthur Bliss Lane

1st United States Minister to Afghanistan
- In office May 4, 1935 – March 16, 1936
- President: Franklin D. Roosevelt
- Preceded by: Diplomatic relations established
- Succeeded by: Louis G. Dreyfus

United States Minister to Iran
- In office March 19, 1934 – March 16, 1936
- President: Franklin D. Roosevelt
- Preceded by: Charles C. Hart
- Succeeded by: Louis G. Dreyfus (1940)

United States Minister to Siam
- In office May 31, 1915 – October 24, 1916
- President: Woodrow Wilson
- Preceded by: Fred Warner Carpenter
- Succeeded by: George Pratt Ingersoll

Member of the Idaho Senate from the Twin Falls district
- In office 1910–1912

Personal details
- Born: July 6, 1884 Cherokee, Iowa
- Died: March 20, 1946 (aged 61) Pacific Grove, California
- Spouse: Yolande Wilson (m. 1906)

William Harrison Hornibrook (July 6, 1884 – October 24, 1946) was an American publisher, politician, and diplomat.

== Biography ==
Hornibrook, born on July 6, 1884, in Utah, started his career as a newspaper publisher in 1906; at one point or another, he owned both the predecessors to The Columbian and the Albany Democrat-Herald, along with various other papers.

In November 1906, he married Yolande Wilson, with whom he had two children, a son and a daughter.

A Democrat, Hornibrook was elected to the Idaho State Senate, from Twin Falls County, serving from 1911 to 1912, before his resignation.

He served as US ambassador to Thailand (then Siam) from 1915 to 1916, later as ambassador to Iran from 1934 to 1936 and Afghanistan from 1935 to 1936, while resident in Tehran. After the recognition of the Afghan government led by King Zahir Shah in August 1934, Hornibrook was appointed the first minister to Afghanistan.

From 1937–1941, he was ambassador to Costa Rica.

He died in March 1946, in Pacific Grove, California.

Diplomatic posts
| Preceded by Fred Warner Carpenter | United States Minister to Siam; 1915-1916 | Succeeded by George Pratt Ingersoll |
| Preceded by Charles C. Hart | United States Minister to Iran; 1934–1936 | Succeeded by Louis G. Dreyfus Jr. |
| New title Diplomatic relations established | United States Minister to Afghanistan; 1935-1936 | Succeeded by Louis G. Dreyfus Jr. |
| Preceded by Leo R. Sack | United States Minister to Costa Rica; 1937-1941 | Succeeded by Arthur Bliss Lane |
