= Hobart Amstutz =

American Methodist bishop (1896–1980)

Hobart Baumann Amstutz (September 18, 1896 – February 26, 1980) was a bishop of the American Methodist Church and the United Methodist Church, elected in 1956.

== Early years ==
He was born in Henrietta, Ohio and graduated in 1915 from Oberlin High School (Oberlin, Ohio). He attended Baldwin-Wallace College for two years. He was then drafted into the army in World War I. After WWI, he earned in 1921 his A.B. degree from Northwestern University and in 1923 his Bachelor of Divinity degree from Garrett Theological Seminary and M.A. from Northwestern University. In 1938, Baldwin-Wallace College awarded him an honorary D.D.

== Missionary service ==
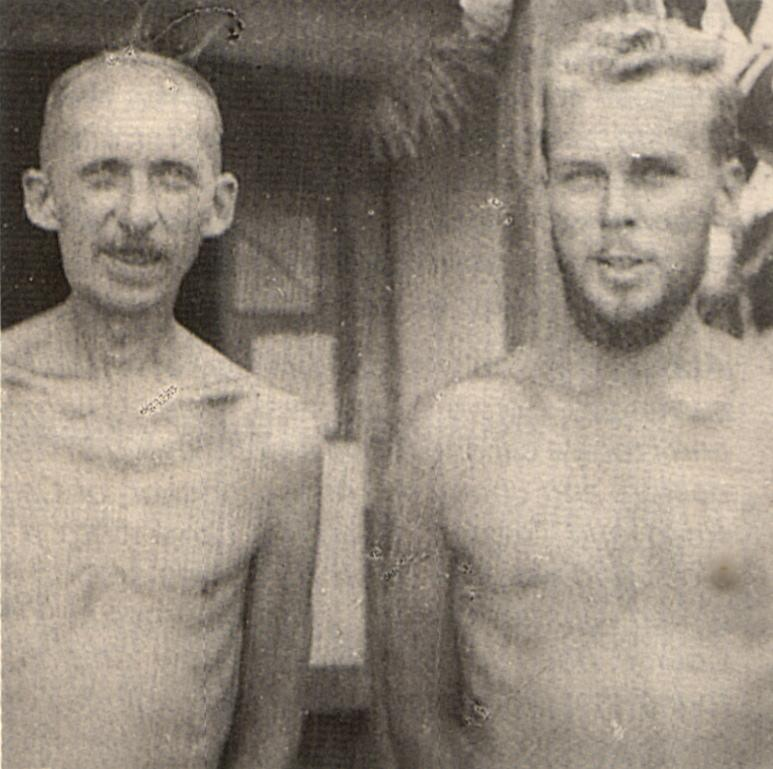
Amstutz and Rev. Tyler Thomson, pastors of Wesley Methodist Church, outside their hut which also served as a religious library at Sime Road Camp, Singapore, where they were interned during World War II.

Amstutz served as a missionary in South East Asia beginning in 1926. For many years, he was pastor of the Wesley Methodist Church in Singapore.

He served as principal of the Jean Hamilton Theological College, which later merged with the Eveland Seminary to become Malaya Methodist Theological College.

In 1942, he was imprisoned by the Japanese, spending three and a half years in a prison camp. His wife Celeste had left the country with their children a few weeks earlier to return to the USA.

After World War II, he worked on the creation of the Trinity Theological College, Singapore and became its first principal, a post he held until he became bishop.

He became the first president of the Inter-Religious Organisation of Singapore and Johor Bahru in March 1949.

From 1956 to 1964, he served as elected Methodist Bishop for Southeast Asia (Singapore, Malaysia, Indonesia, and Burma). Shortly after retirement, he was called to be Methodist Bishop of Pakistan from 1964 to 1968, where he succeeded in creating the Church of Pakistan, an amalgamation of four Protestant churches.

== Death ==
Bishop Amstutz died on February 26, 1980, aged 83, in Claremont, California. He was survived by his wife, Celeste; a son, Bruce, who was serving as a U.S. diplomat in Afghanistan; a daughter Beverly; and a brother, Clarence Amstutz.

== See also ==
- List of bishops of the United Methodist Church
