= James Clement Dunn =

American diplomat (1890–1979)

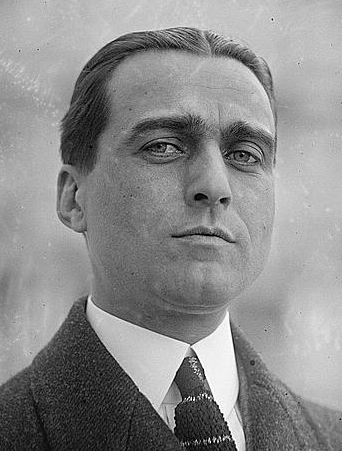
- James Clement Dunn in 1921

11th United States Ambassador to Brazil
- In office March 11, 1955 – July 4, 1956
- President: Dwight D. Eisenhower
- Preceded by: James S. Kemper
- Succeeded by: Ellis O. Briggs

47th United States Ambassador to Spain
- In office April 9, 1953 – February 9, 1955
- President: Dwight D. Eisenhower
- Preceded by: Lincoln MacVeagh
- Succeeded by: John Davis Lodge

16th United States Ambassador to France
- In office March 27, 1952 – March 2, 1953
- President: Harry S. Truman; Dwight D. Eisenhower
- Preceded by: David K. E. Bruce
- Succeeded by: C. Douglas Dillon

16th United States Ambassador to Italy
- In office February 6, 1947 – March 17, 1952
- President: Harry S. Truman
- Preceded by: Alexander Comstock Kirk
- Succeeded by: Ellsworth Bunker

1st and 4th Chief of Protocol of the United States
- In office June 11, 1933 – April 11, 1935
- President: Franklin D. Roosevelt
- Preceded by: Warren Delano Robbins
- Succeeded by: Richard Southgate
- In office February 4, 1928 – November 17, 1930
- President: Calvin Coolidge; Herbert Hoover
- Preceded by: Office established
- Succeeded by: F. Lammot Belin

Charge d’Affaires ad interim to Haiti
- In office April 1922 – February 1924
- Preceded by: Arthur Bailly-Blanchard (as ambassador)
- Succeeded by: George R. Merrell, Jr. (Charge d’Affaires ad interim)

Personal details
- Born: December 27, 1890 Newark, New Jersey, U.S.
- Died: April 10, 1979 (aged 88) West Palm Beach, Florida, U.S.
- Cause of death: Myocardial infarction
- Spouse: Mary Augusta Armour
- Children: 2
- Profession: Diplomat

James Clement Dunn (December 27, 1890 – April 10, 1979) was an American diplomat and a career employee of the United States Department of State. He served as the Ambassador of the United States to Italy, France, Spain, and Brazil. President Dwight Eisenhower characterized him as providing "exceptionally capable service".

== Early life ==
Dunn was born in Newark, New Jersey. He was privately educated and later studied for a law degree. He initially practiced as an architect in Manhattan.

During World War I, he served as a lieutenant in the U.S. Navy, serving as an assistant naval attaché to Havana, Cuba from 1917 to 1919.

== Career ==
After the war, Dunn became a clerk for the United States Department of State. He then took and passed the Foreign Service entrance exam. He was appointed to be the third secretary at the embassy in Madrid, Spain, where he remained for two years. He was the chargé d'affaires ad interim in Port-au-Prince, Haiti, from April 1922 to February 1924. He was also the first secretary for the embassy in London, England.

In 1927, President Calvin Coolidge pulled him from foreign service because he needed a White House director of ceremonies. On February 4, 1928, he became the chief of protocol, with his title changing to the chief of the Division of International Conferences and Protocol on February 15, 1929, when that position was created. His duties included arranging the dates and agendas of the United States' participation in international conferences and issuing ceremonial statements to the officials of other countries. He served in this role through November 17, 1930.

He was appointed counsel to the Commission for the Study of Haiti from 1930 to 1935. He was again the chief of protocol from June 11, 1933 to April 11, 1935.

Under President Franklin Roosevelt, he was a special assistant to Secretary of State Cordell Hull. Dunn was a political advisor in European affairs during the Spanish Civil War, becoming "a powerful influence in holding U.S. policy to an embargo on arms for both sides in Spain—to the chagrin of the U.S. left wing."

During World War II, Dunn was assigned to the State Department's Division of Political Affairs. This placed him in a "small circle" that worked with Assistant Secretary of State Breckinridge Long to implement America's refugee policy. Dunn's role appears to have been to suppress news about the killing of Jews from reaching America, which in turn obstructed rescue opportunities. Specifically, he tried to stop information of the mass murders from reaching Rabbi Stephen Samuel Wise, an American Jewish leader, in the summer of 1942.

In early 1943, Dunn was involved in the order sent to diplomats in Switzerland to stop sending reports about the killing of Jews. When his order was later discovered by Treasury Department officials, it started a major controversy. In response to Treasury Secretary Henry Morgenthau Jr. and his aides who took an interest in possible rescue missions, Dunn responded, "This Jew Morgenthau and his Jewish assistant [Josiah E.] DuBois are trying to run the State Department." DuBois was not Jewish.

Dunn's involvement with the suppression of information about the European Jews eventually leaked to the press. In an April 1944 radio broadcast, Drew Person "blamed Dunn by name for squandering an opportunity to rescue several hundred rabbis whose deportation to Auschwitz had been temporarily postponed because they held Latin American passports." Dunn was also criticized on the floor of the Senate by William Langer, a key advocate for rescuing the Jews, in December 1944.

However, on December 20, 1944, Secretary of State Edward R. Stettinius appointed Dunn the Assistant Secretary of State for European, Far Eastern, Near Eastern, and African Affairs, and he served in this capacity through November 11, 1946.

He was also a member of the United States delegation to major wartime conferences. He attended the Dumbarton Oaks meeting in Washington, D.C. In 1946, he was the chief political adviser for the Berlin Conference. He was also the deputy at the Council of Foreign Ministers conferences in London, Paris and New York from 1945 to 1946. He was a member of the delegation at the Paris Peace Conference in 1946.

From April to June 1945, he served on the United States delegation for the meeting of fifty nations in San Francisco that created the United Nations. There, Dunn worked behind the scenes to create a pro-French consensus and to protect France's colonial interests in French Indochina. He was once called a 'fascist' by Eleanor Roosevelt for his views on colonial matters.

On July 25, 1946, he was appointed Ambassador Extraordinary and Plenipotentiary for Italy. He served in Italy from February 6, 1947 through March 17, 1952. Time noted, "As U.S. Ambassador to Italy in the touch & go postwar years, James Clement Dunn was credited with an important part in keeping Italy free from Communist control." He had once directly asked then-prime minister Alcide de Gasperi to dissolve Italian parliament and remove the PCI.

His next post was as the Ambassador to France from March 27, 1952, to March 2, 1953. Then, President Dwight D. Eisenhower made him the Ambassador to Spain from April 9, 1953, to February 9, 1955. There, he worked on policies to establish a good relationship with Francisco Franco.

On January 24, 1955, he was appointed the Ambassador to Brazil, serving there from March 11, 1955, to July 4, 1956. He toured the backwaters and remote jungles by dugout canoe, jeep, and airplane.

Dunn retired from the Service on July 1, 1956. When he retired, The Washington Post wrote, "Jimmy" Dunn had served, among other things, as a kind of press spokesman for the uncommunicative secretary of state Hull. Mr. Dunn's stock went up and up with the newspapermen, and he came to be appreciated as a fine public servant, with a great knowledge of diplomatic precedent and history which made him one of the best ambassadors of our times."

== Honors ==
Dunn received the State Department's Distinguished Service Award for his work as Ambassador to Italy where he helped defeat the Communists in the critical 1948 elections.

In April 1956, Dunn was nominated as one of the United States' first "five-star diplomats" with the rank of career ambassador. He officially received the designation of career ambassador on March 7, 1956.

In 1980, the Vincent Astor Foundation endowed the James Clement Dunn Award at the U.S. Department of State in Dunn's memory. The award recognizes exemplary performance in the Department of State at the mid-career level in the areas of intellectual skills, leadership, and managerial skills. Recipients receive $10,000.

The James C. Dunn Papers are housed at the Harry S. Truman Library & Museum.

== Personal life ==
Dunn married Mary Augusta Armour. She was a member of the meat-packing family. They had two daughters, Marianna Dunn and Cynthia Dunn.

Dunn kept a house in Washington, D.C. from 1927 until 1957. After his retirement, he lived in Rome, Italy. In 1977, they moved to New York City.

Dunn was a governor of the Metropolitan Club and a member of the Alibi Club, the Knickerbocker Club, the Regency Club, the River Club, and the Whist Club in New York. He was Episcopalian.

In 1979, he died of a heart attack at the Palm Beach Community Hospital in West Palm Beach, Florida at the age of 87 years. He was buried in Greenwich, Connecticut.

Diplomatic posts
Preceded by Alexander C. Kirk	United States Ambassador to Italy; 1946–1952	Succeeded by Ellsworth Bunker
Preceded by David K. E. Bruce	United States Ambassador to France; 1952–1953	Succeeded by C. Douglas Dillon
Preceded by Lincoln MacVeagh	United States Ambassador to Spain; 1953–1955	Succeeded by John Lodge
Preceded by James S. Kemper	United States Ambassador to Brazil; 11 March 1955–4 July 1956	Succeeded by Ellis O. Briggs
