= Adolph Dubs =

United States Ambassador to Afghanistan (1920–1979)

13th United States Ambassador to Afghanistan
- In office July 12, 1978 – February 14, 1979
- President: Jimmy Carter
- Preceded by: Theodore L. Eliot Jr.
- Succeeded by: Robert Finn (2002)

Personal details
- Born: August 4, 1920 Chicago, Illinois, U.S.
- Died: February 14, 1979 (aged 58) Kabul, Democratic Republic of Afghanistan
- Resting place: Arlington National Cemetery
- Spouses: Jane Wilson (m. 1945; div. 1976) Mary Anne Parsons (m. 1976)
- Children: 1 (adopted)
- Education: Beloit College

Military service
- Allegiance: United States
- Branch/service: United States Navy
- Rank: Lieutenant commander
- Battles/wars: World War II

Adolph Dubs (August 4, 1920 – February 14, 1979), also known as Spike Dubs, was an American diplomat who served as the United States Ambassador to Afghanistan from May 13, 1978, until his death in 1979. He was killed during a rescue attempt after his kidnapping.

== Career ==
Dubs was born in Chicago, Illinois. A 1938 graduate of Carl Schurz High School, he graduated from Beloit College in 1942 with a degree in political science. While at Beloit, classmates, who said they did not want to refer to Dubs by the first name of an enemy dictator, gave him the nickname "Spike", which stuck for the rest of his life. Dubs served in the United States Navy during World War II. Later, he completed graduate studies at Georgetown University and foreign service studies at Harvard University and Washington University in St. Louis. He subsequently entered the United States Foreign Service as a career diplomat, and his postings included Germany, Liberia, Canada, Yugoslavia, and the Soviet Union. He became a noted Soviet expert, and in 1973–74 he served as ranking charge d'affaires at the United States Embassy in Moscow.

At the time of his death he was married to his second wife Mary Anne Dubs, a Washington-based journalist. He was previously married for over 30 years to Jane Wilson Dubs (1922–1993), his college girlfriend from Beloit College, whom he married in 1945 and divorced in 1976. He had one daughter, Lindsay Dubs McLaughlin (1953–), who lives in West Virginia.

== Kidnapping and death ==
In 1978, Dubs was appointed United States Ambassador to Afghanistan following the Saur Revolution, a coup d'état which brought the Soviet-aligned Khalq faction to power. Dubs was being driven from his residence to the U.S. embassy shortly before 9 a.m. on February 14, 1979, on the same day that Iranian militants attacked the U.S. Embassy in Tehran, Iran, and just months before the Soviet invasion of Afghanistan. He was approaching the U.S. Cultural Center when four men stopped his armored black Chevrolet limousine. Some accounts say that the men were wearing Afghan police uniforms, while others state that only one of the four was wearing a police uniform. The men gestured to the car to open its windows, which were bulletproof, and the ambassador's driver complied. The militants then threatened the driver with a pistol, forcing him to take Dubs to the Kabul Hotel in downtown Kabul. The abduction occurred within sight of Afghan police. Dubs was held in Room 117 on the first floor of the hotel, and the driver was sent to the U.S. embassy to tell the U.S. of the kidnapping.

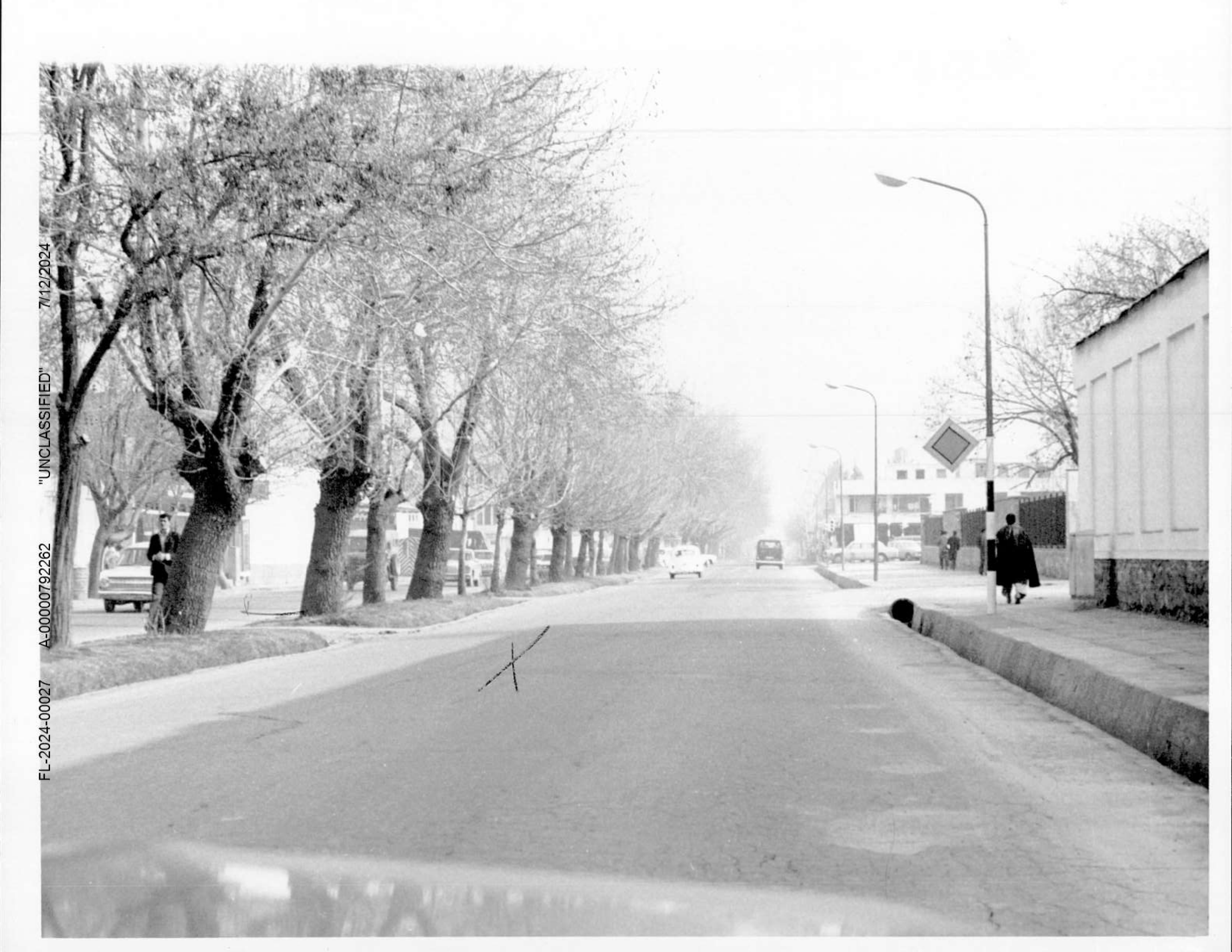
Kidnapping site, marked with an "x".

At the hotel, the abductors allegedly demanded that the Democratic Republic of Afghanistan (DRA) release "one or more religious or political prisoners." "No demands were made of the American government, nor did the DRA ever give a complete or consistent account of the kidnappers' desires." Some accounts state that the militants demanded the exchange of Tahir Badakhshi, Badruddin Bahes (who may have already been dead), and Wasef Bakhtari.

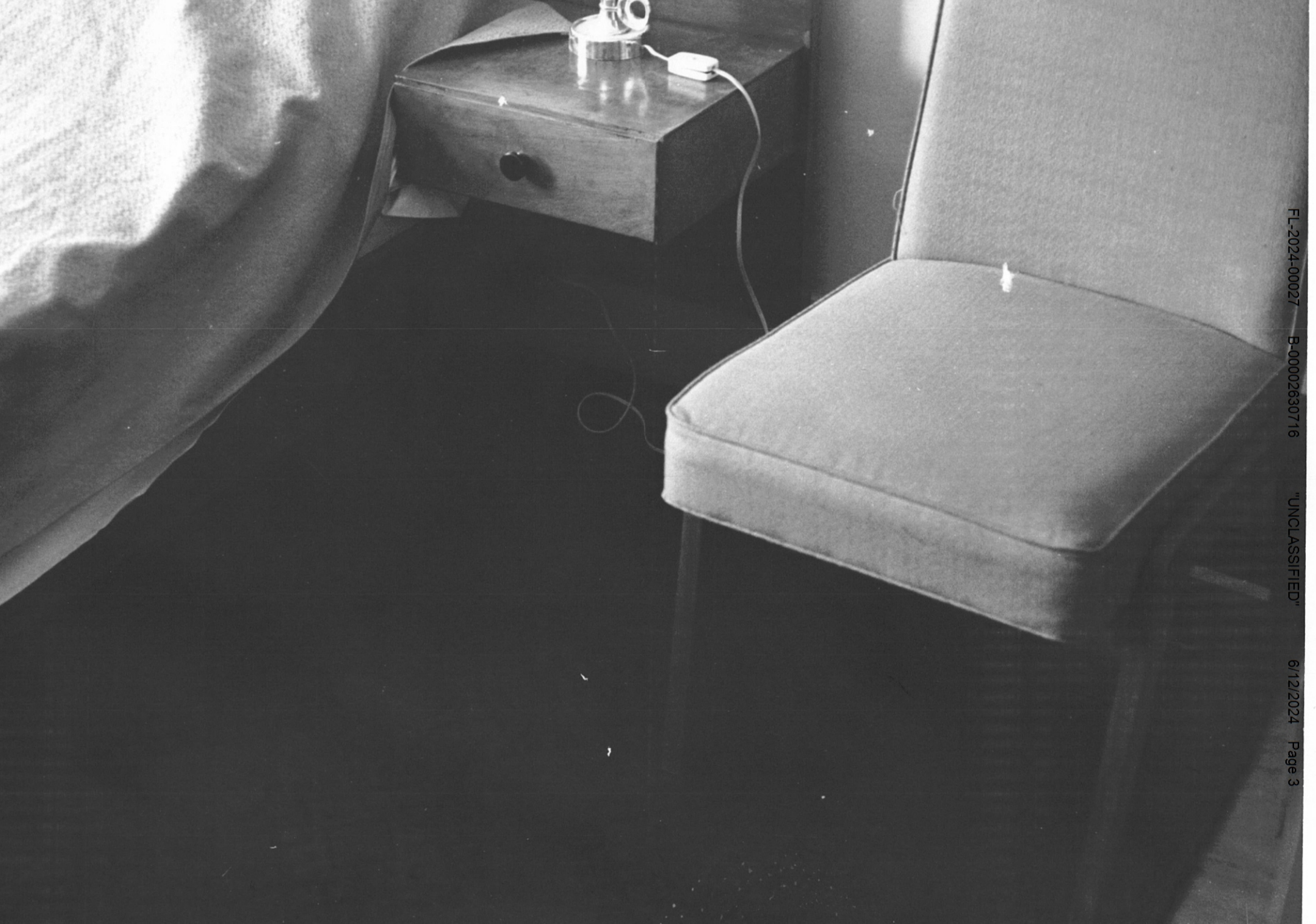
Dubs' chair during the rescue attempt

The U.S. urged waiting in order not to endanger Dubs' life, but the Afghan police disregarded these pleas to negotiate and attacked on the advice of Soviet officers. The weapons and flak jackets used by the Afghans were provided by the Soviets, and the hotel lobby had multiple Soviet officials, including the KGB security chief, the lead Soviet advisor to the Afghan police, and the second secretary at the Soviet embassy. At the end of the morning, a shot was heard. Afghan police then stormed Room 117 with heavy automatic gunfire. After a short, intense firefight, estimated at 40 seconds to one minute, Dubs was found dead, killed by shots to the head. Two abductors died in the firefight, as well. An autopsy showed that he had been shot in the head from a distance of six inches. The other two abductors were captured alive but were shot shortly afterwards; their bodies were shown to U.S. officials before dusk.

The true identity and aims of the militants are uncertain, and the crime "has never been satisfactorily explained" although U.S., Afghan, and Soviet officials "were all but eyewitnesses" to it. The circumstances have been described as "mysterious" and "still clouded." Several factors obscured the events, including the killing of the surviving captors, lack of forensic analysis of the scene, lack of access for U.S. investigators, and planting of evidence. Soviet or Afghan conspiracy was not proven.

Some attribute responsibility for the kidnapping and murder to the leftist anti-Pashtun group Settam-e-Melli, but others consider that to be dubious, pointing to a former Kabul policeman who has claimed that at least one kidnapper was part of the Parcham faction of the People's Democratic Party of Afghanistan. Disinformation that was spread in the Soviet and Afghan press after the murder blamed the incident on the CIA, Hafizullah Amin, or both. Anthony Arnold suggested that "it was obvious that only one power… would benefit from the murder—the Soviet Union," as the death of the ambassador "irrevocably poisoned" the U.S.–Afghan relationship, "leaving the USSR with a monopoly of great power influence over" the Nur Muhammad Taraki government. Carter's national security adviser Zbigniew Brzezinski stated that Dubs' death "was a tragic event which involved either Soviet ineptitude or collusion", while the Afghan handling of the incident was "inept." The Taraki government refused U.S. requests for an investigation into the death.

The Carter administration was outraged by the murder of the ambassador and by the conduct of the Afghan government, and began to disengage from Afghanistan and express sympathy with Afghan regime opponents. The incident hastened the decline in U.S.–Afghan relations, causing the United States to make a fundamental reassessment of its policy. In reaction to Dubs' murder, the U.S. immediately cut planned humanitarian aid of $15 million by half and canceled all planned military aid of $250,000, and the U.S. terminated all economic support by December 1979, when the Soviet occupation of the country was complete. The Afghan government aimed to diminish the U.S. presence in Afghanistan and restricted the number of Peace Corps volunteers and cultural exchange programs. On July 23, the State Department announced the withdrawal of non-essential U.S. embassy staff from Kabul and the majority of the diplomats as security deteriorated, and the U.S. only had some 20 staff members in Kabul by December. Dubs was not replaced by a new ambassador, and a chargé d'affaires led the skeleton staff at the embassy.

The death of Dubs was listed as a "Significant Terrorist Incident" by the State Department. Documents released from the Soviet KGB archives by Vasily Mitrokhin in the 1990s showed that the Afghan government clearly authorized the assault despite forceful demands for peaceful negotiations by the U.S., and that KGB adviser Sergei Bakhturin may have recommended the assault, as well as the execution of a kidnapper before U.S. experts could interrogate him. The Mitrokhin archives also indicate that the fourth kidnapper escaped and the body of a freshly killed prisoner served as a substitute for the U.S. inspection. Other questions remain unanswered.

According to Mitrokhin, the Soviets were alarmed by Dubs becoming U.S. ambassador to Afghanistan. Worried Dubs knew the region deeply and had CIA ties, they saw his appointment as a U.S. attempt to sway the new Afghan government and prevent them from aligning with the USSR. A KGB agent in Kabul in August 1978, Viliov G. Osadchy expressed deep concern about Dubs becoming ambassador. Not only did they perceive him as knowledgeable and potentially linked to the CIA, but they also feared he would leverage his understanding of the USSR and foreign policy to influence Afghan leaders. This, they saw as "one of the most dangerous aspects" of Dubs' activities. The agent further claimed the US embassy, led by Dubs, was actively using propaganda among civilians and intellectuals to paint the USSR as an occupying force aiming to expand its influence to neighbouring countries.

Mitrokhin writes that Dubs was kidnapped in Kabul on 14 February 1979 by unknown assailants and held hostage at the Hotel Kabul. They demanded the release of two already-executed members of Settam-e-Melli group, sparking confusion. Following Soviet advice, Amin ordered a brutal armed raid using Soviet equipment. Dubs and two attackers were killed, one captured, and another escaped despite the attackers being outgunned.

During the Dubs kidnapping event, Soviet officials at the hotel (Bakhturin, security assistant Yu. I. Kutepov, secretaries including A. S. Klushnikov, and an advisor) pushed for a forceful solution. They wanted to avoid negotiations, media attention, and any American involvement. After the deadly raid, they even staged evidence by planting a gun and preventing bullet shell collection. It seems they aimed to control the narrative and hide potential involvement or responsibility.

Fearing US scrutiny, Soviet officials (Osadchy and another Soviet advisor) met with Amin to craft a cover story for Dubs' death. The plan involved condolences, lowered flags, staged photos of dead "terrorists," and eliminating potential witnesses.

After toppling Amin, the Soviets spun a new tale about Dubs' death:

- Dubs was kidnapped by Shiite Muslims opposing Amin's brutal regime.
- The "terrorists" forced Dubs to confess US ties to Amin, aiming to expose their collaboration.
- Amin, acting as an American/CIA puppet, ordered an unnecessary raid, leading to Dubs' death.
- The "terrorists" were killed or eliminated to silence potential witnesses proving Amin's CIA ties

This rewrite paints Amin as the villain for suppressing Muslims and colluding with the US, blames him for Dubs' death, and justifies silencing potential truth-tellers. It paints the Soviets as righteous liberators rectifying Amin's mistakes.

Internment at Arlington National Cemetery

Dubs is buried at Arlington National Cemetery, in Arlington, Virginia.

== Memorials ==
Dubs is commemorated by the American Foreign Service Association with a plaque in the Truman Building in Washington, D.C., and by a memorial in Kabul.

Camp Dubs, named after Dubs, was a U.S. military camp at the Darul Aman Palace in southwest Kabul.

== See also ==
- Ambassadors of the United States killed in office
- List of kidnappings
- List of solved missing person cases: 1950–1999
- List of unsolved murders (1900–1979)

Diplomatic posts
Preceded by Theodore L. Eliot, Jr.	United States Ambassador to Afghanistan; 1978–1979	Succeeded by J. Bruce Amstutz (Charge d'affaires) Robert Finn (Ambassador in 2002)
