= Christian M. Ravndal =

American career Foreign Service Officer and diplomat

2nd Director General of the Foreign Service
- In office May 1, 1947 – June 23, 1949
- Preceded by: Selden Chapin
- Succeeded by: Richard P. Butrick

Personal details
- Born: January 6, 1899; Beirut, Syria
- Died: October 18, 1984 (aged 85); Vienna, Austria
- Parent(s): G. Bie Ravndal; Maren Magelssen
- Education: Robert College; Luther College

Christian Magelssen Ravndal (January 6, 1899 – October 18, 1984) was an American Career Foreign Service Officer FSO who served as the 2nd Director General of the Foreign Service from May 1, 1947, until June 23, 1949, Ambassador Extraordinary and Plenipotentiary to Uruguay (1949–1951), Hungary (1951–1956), Ecuador (1956–1960), and Czechoslovakia (1960–1961), among many other postings during a prolific career spanning 40+ years.

== Early life and family ==
Christian Ravndal was born in Beirut, (Then Syria of the Ottoman Empire on January 6, 1899)to Maren Magelssen and G. Bie Ravndal. His father, Gabriel (Known as G.Bie Ravndal) was born in Norway but became a naturalized United States Citizen and was a prominent newspaper editor and elected to the South Dakota House of Representatives before joining the foreign service. He served as US Consul to Beirut at the time of Christian's birth.

Christian attended Robert College and graduated from Luther College College in Iowa, where he was inducted into the school's Sports Hall of fame Tennis, joining his father (G. Bie) who had also played Tennis at Luther.

Christian served in the Army during World War I before joining the Foreign Service as a code clerk at the U.S. mission in Vienna in 1921. After WWII, he became the second director general of the Foreign Service after being appointed to the position less than two months after Truman unveiled his celebrated foreign policy doctrine to Congress in March 1947.

He died at his summer home in Vienna after suffering a series of strokes.

== Career ==
Christian retired in 1961 after 40 years with the State Department, was the 2nd director general of the newly formed Foreign Service from 1947 to 1949, and later served as ambassador to Uruguay, Ecuador, and Czechoslovakia. He was also minister to Hungary from 1951 to 1956. Leaving his post just a few months before the Hungarian Revolution of 1956.

He joined the Foreign Service as a code clerk at the U.S. mission in Vienna in 1921 and rose to the personal rank of career minister in 1947. When he became director general in 1947, it was his task to reorganize what had been an elite corps into a body that was representative of a cross-section of America's population.

Mr. Ravndal was fluent in German, Spanish, and Swedish and had a working knowledge of French, Turkish, and Hungarian. His style of diplomacy included informal contacts with ordinary people in the countries where he was posted in addition to dealing with government officials.
