= J. Bruce Amstutz =

American Career Foreign Service Officer (1928–2021)

James Bruce Amstutz (July 11, 1928 – March 16, 2021) was an American Career Foreign Service Officer who served as Chargé d’Affaires ad interim to Afghanistan from February 1979 until February 1980.

Amstutz was born on July 11, 1928. He was Deputy Chief of Mission when Ambassador Adolph "Spike" Dubs was kidnapped and murdered. Amstutz became Chargé and sought out by the head of the Afghan Communist regime, Hafizullah Amin. They had met four times for a total of under 20 minutes, mostly for ceremonial events. In October 1979, Amstutz was going on a six weeks leave and had various concerns including telling Washington that “the Afghan Communists as ‘a bunch of scorpions biting each other to death’” and that Amin had “a semi-psychopathic desire to humiliate and revenge himself against the United States.” So Amstutz recommended a delay by himself and the new Deputy Chief of Mission Archer Blood. Amstutz was married to Nan Louise Grindle, whom he met while they both attended the Fletcher School of Law and Diplomacy. They became the first couple to simultaneously receive Ph.D. degrees from the institution. Amstutz died in Alna, Maine on March 16, 2021, at the age of 92.

== Publications ==
- Afghanistan: The First Five Years of Soviet Occupation Washington, DC: NDU Press, 1986

== See also ==
Hobart Baumann Amstutz
