= Richard P. Butrick =

American diplomat (1894–1997)

3rd Director General of the Foreign Service
- In office September 7, 1949 – April 1, 1952
- Preceded by: Christian M. Ravndal
- Succeeded by: Gerald Augustin Drew

Personal details
- Born: August 6, 1894 Lockport, New York, U.S.
- Died: April 13, 1997 (aged 102) Washington, D.C., U.S.
- Education: Georgetown University

Richard Porter Butrick (August 6, 1894 – April 13, 1997) was the director general of the US Foreign Service from 1949 to 1952.

Butrick was born in Lockport, New York on August 6, 1894 and was a graduate of the first class of Georgetown University's School of Foreign Service (1921), died from cardiac arrest at Sibley Memorial Hospital at the age of 102.

He was consul general in São Paulo, Brazil, when he retired in 1959 with the rank of career minister. He was consul general in Montreal (1952–1955) and Minister to Iceland. Butrick died on April 13, 1997, in Washington, D.C., from cardiac arrest at the age of 102.
