= Embassy of the United States, Cairo =

- Location: Cairo, Egypt
- Address: 5 Tawfik Diab St, Qasr Ad Dobarah, Qasr El Nil, Cairo Governorate 11451, Egypt
- Coordinates: 30°2′28″N 31°13′59″E
- Website: https://eg.usembassy.gov

The Embassy of the United States in Cairo is the diplomatic mission of the United States of America in Egypt.

== History ==
The United States recognized Egyptian independence from the United Kingdom on April 26, 1922, following a proclamation by President Warren G. Harding. This recognition elevated the U.S. representation in Egypt from a consular to a diplomatic mission, and the U.S. Diplomatic Agent and Consul General in Cairo, J. Morton Howell, became the head of the American Legation.

The establishment of the United Arab Republic (UAR), a short-lived union between Egypt and Syria, was recognized by the United States in 1958, and the embassy remained in Cairo after Syria's secession from the union. The UAR severed diplomatic relations with the United States on June 6, 1967, during the Six-Day War. A U.S. Interests Section was set up within the Spanish Embassy in Cairo the following day.

Diplomatic relations were restored on February 28, 1974, and Hermann Eilts was appointed as the ambassador in charge of the American Embassy, which was reopened the same day.

On September 11 2012, Egyptian demonstrators managed to breach the embassy's perimeter, replacing the U.S. flag with a black flag inscribed with an Islamic creed. The incident at the Cairo embassy occurred concurrently with a more violent episode in Libya. In response to these events, the U.S. government took measures to bolster security at its diplomatic missions worldwide.

== See also ==
- Egypt–United States relations
- Embassy of Egypt, Washington, D.C.
- List of ambassadors of the United States to Egypt
- United States Ambassador to Egypt
