= Lester D. Mallory =

American diplomat

Ambassador Lester D. Mallory

Lester DeWitt Mallory (April 21, 1904 – June 21, 1994) was an American diplomat.

Mallory was born in Houlton, Maine. He received a bachelor of science in agriculture in 1927 and a Master of Science in agriculture degree in 1929 from the University of British Columbia. Mallory earned a Ph.D. in agricultural economics from the University of California, Berkeley in 1935.

The son of Enrique and May Mallory, Mallory spent his early years in Oregon, Alberta, and British Columbia, and attended Naramota and Oak Bay High Schools in British Columbia from 1919 to 1922. From 1927 to 1928 Mallory was an assistant in horticulture at the University of British Columbia, and in 1929 worked as secretary of the British Columbia Fruit Growers.

Mallory began working for the United States federal government in 1931, initially for the Department of Agriculture as assistant agricultural commissioner in Marseille, to which position he was appointed June 15, 1931. Mallory was selected for this position on the basis of his expertise in analysis of horticultural products.

From July 1933 to August 1934 Mallory was assigned to Washington as an associate agricultural economist in the Agricultural Adjustment Administration of USDA, working on farm credit issues. In August 1934 he was assigned to Paris as assistant agricultural attaché. Effective June 2, 1938, he was designated acting agricultural attaché, and as of June 1, 1939, he was appointed agricultural attaché at Paris.

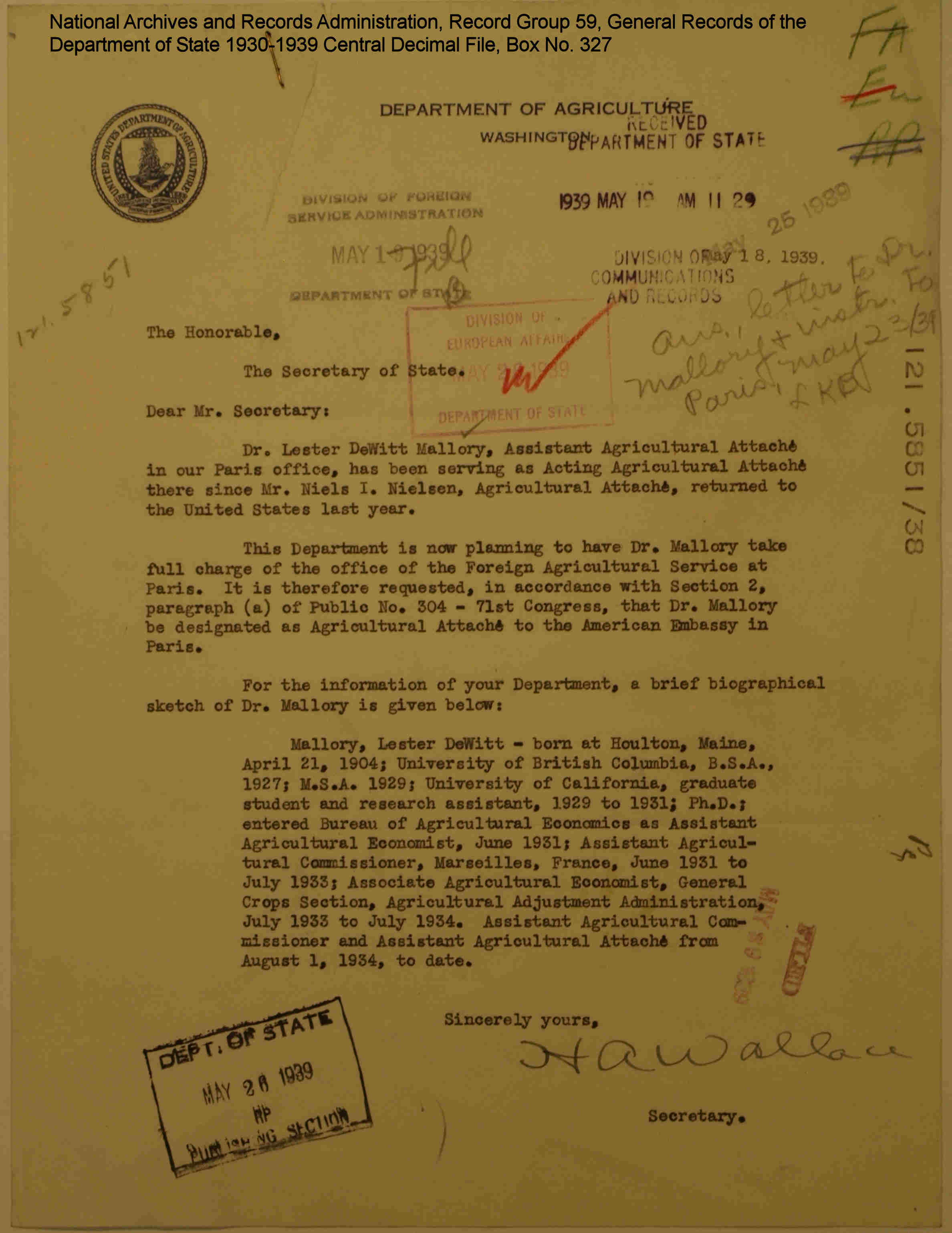
Letter from Secretary of Agriculture Henry Wallace to the Secretary of State advising of Mallory's appointment as agricultural attaché at Paris. Source: National Archives and Records Administration

Mallory was evacuated to the United States with the outbreak of World War II in September 1939 and reassigned as the first U.S. agricultural attaché in Mexico City. At that time he was commissioned a Foreign Service Officer in the Department of State, as the Foreign Agricultural Service was abolished and agricultural attachés were transferred from USDA to State in that year.

Mallory subsequently served in liberated Paris, from Christmas Eve 1944 until mid-1945. During his tour of duty in Paris, Mallory was granted permission by the Department of State to marry a foreign national, Eleanor Mercedes Struck y Bulnes, whom he had met in Mexico City. He then returned to the U.S., where he was liaison officer between USDA's Office of Foreign Agricultural Relations and the U.S. Department of State. Mallory was assigned to Havana as counselor of embassy (deputy chief of mission) in 1947 and in 1949 to Buenos Aires in the same capacity. On August 23, 1950, President Truman appointed Mallory to the personal rank of Minister.

Mallory served as Ambassador to Jordan from 1953 to 1958 and to Guatemala in 1958 and 1959. During his tour of duty in Jordan, on July 20, 1955, Mallory was promoted to the then-highest Foreign Service rank, Career Minister. Mallory was a Deputy Assistant Secretary of State for Western Hemisphere Affairs in 1960 and retired from the State Department on October 31 of that year.

Mallory then joined the Inter-American Development Bank, working in Washington, D.C., Costa Rica, and Panama, and helped establish the anthropology department at the University of Guadalajara, Mexico. In 1961 the Guatemalan government presented him with the Order of the Quetzal.

He lived in Lake Forest, California and died following a heart attack at Saddleback Hospital in Laguna Hills, California. The conference room of the Foreign Agricultural Service's office in the U.S. Embassy in Mexico City is named in his honor. His oral history interview was published by the Association for Diplomatic Studies and Training.

== His role in the embargo against Cuba ==
As Deputy Assistant Secretary, he wrote an internal memo on April 6, 1960, suggesting an embargo. He said that, since "[m]ost Cubans support Castro" and "there is no effective political opposition ... [t]he only foreseeable means of alienating internal support is through disenchantment and disaffection based on economic dissatisfaction and hardship". Mallory proposed "denying money and supplies to Cuba, to decrease monetary and real wages, to bring about hunger, desperation and overthrow of government". Later that year, the Eisenhower administration instituted the embargo. The memo was declassified in 1991.

Diplomatic posts
Preceded by Joseph C. Green	United States Ambassador to Jordan; December 1, 1953–January 11, 1958	Succeeded by Parker T. Hart
Preceded by Edward J. Sparks	United States Ambassador to Guatemala; February 27, 1958–November 11, 1959	Succeeded by John J. Muccio
