= Francis J. Ricciardone Jr. =

American diplomat

Francis Joseph Ricciardone Jr.
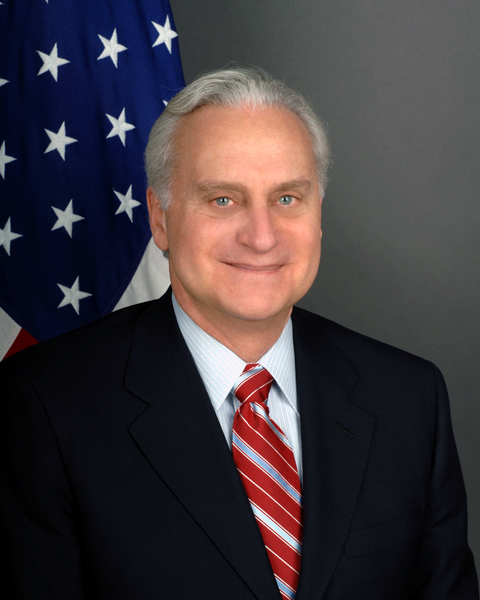

President of the American University in Cairo
- In office July 1, 2016 – June 2021
- Preceded by: Thomas E. Thomason (interim); Lisa Anderson
- Succeeded by: Ahmad Dallal

United States Ambassador to Turkey
- In office January 28, 2011 – July 7, 2014
- President: Barack Obama
- Preceded by: James Franklin Jeffrey
- Succeeded by: John R. Bass

United States Deputy Ambassador to Afghanistan
- In office 2009–2010

United States Ambassador to Egypt
- In office November 13, 2005 – April 18, 2008
- Preceded by: C. David Welch
- Succeeded by: Margaret Scobey

United States Ambassador to the Philippines
- In office February 21, 2002 – April 3, 2005
- Preceded by: Robert W. Fitts
- Succeeded by: Joseph A. Mussomeli

United States Ambassador to Palau
- In office July 6, 2002 – October 10, 2004
- Preceded by: Thomas C. Hubbard
- Succeeded by: Helen Reed-Rowe

Personal details
- Born: 1951 (age 74–75) Boston, Massachusetts, U.S.
- Spouse: Marie Ricciardone
- Education: Dartmouth College (BA)
- Profession: Diplomat

Francis Joseph Ricciardone Jr. (born 1952) is a former President of the American University in Cairo. Ricciardone was the United States ambassador to Turkey between 2011 and 2014. Previously he was Deputy Ambassador at the U.S. Embassy in Kabul, Afghanistan. He was also on leave from the U.S. Department of State as a guest scholar at the U.S. Institute of Peace. He has served as U.S. Ambassador to the Arab Republic of Egypt (2005–2008), the Republic of the Philippines and the Republic of Palau (2002–2005). As a career member of the Senior Foreign Service, he received U.S. government and other organization awards for his work in foreign policy and program management, political reporting and analysis, and peacekeeping.

== Early life and career ==
Ricciardone is the son of Francis Ricciardone Sr., a Seabee veteran of World War II. He graduated from Malden Catholic High School in Malden, Massachusetts.

Upon graduating summa cum laude with a B.A. from Dartmouth College in 1973, he received a Fulbright Scholarship for teaching and study in Italy. He went to Iran as a teacher in 1976 where he taught at the Community School, Tehran, traveling widely in Southwest Asia, Europe, and the Middle East until he entered the Foreign Service in 1978.

He speaks Italian, Turkish, Arabic and French.

== AUC Presidency ==
Ricciardone was named president of the American University in Cairo and assumed office on July 1, 2016. Having no experience in higher education, and lacking an advanced university degree, Ricciardone's tenure was controversial. In 2016, protests erupted after Ricciardone raised tuition. In February 2019, the faculty of the American University overwhelmingly voted that they had "no confidence" in Ricciardone's leadership. According to The New York Times, the faculty members cited low morale, complaints about his management style, grievances over contracts and accusations of illegal discrimination. On Feb 10, 2019 the Board of Trustees of the American University in Cairo voted unanimously to reaffirm its “continued confidence” and “unqualified support” in Ricciardone and his administration, and extended his contract as President. Ricciardone retired from the Presidency in June, 2021. Over the term of Ricciardone's presidency, AUC's ranking dropped from 364 to 1000, according to Times Higher Education.

== Foreign service ==
Nominated by President George W. Bush on July 25, 2005, and confirmed by the United States Senate on July 29, 2005, Ricciardone was sworn in as United States Ambassador to Egypt on August 26, 2005.

Ricciardone was Deputy Ambassador for the American mission to Afghanistan from May 2010.

Ricciardone's nomination to be ambassador to Turkey stalled during 2010, and in late 2010, President Obama gave Ricciardone a recess appointment so he could begin serving. The U.S. Senate then confirmed Ricciardone in a voice vote on October 4, 2011.

== Family ==
Ricciardone is married to Marie, a molecular biologist who was educated and later taught in Turkish universities during her husband's service time in Turkey. The couple has two daughters, Francesca and Chiara. Francesca was born in Turkey. Both daughters were schooled in Ankara for three years.

Diplomatic posts
Preceded by Robert W. Fitts	United States Ambassador to the Philippines; 2002–2005	Succeeded by Joseph A. Mussomeli
Preceded by Thomas C. Hubbard	United States Ambassador to Palau; 2002–2004	Succeeded by Helen Reed-Rowe
Preceded by C. David Welch	United States Ambassador to Egypt; 2005–2008	Succeeded by Margaret Scobey
Preceded by James Franklin Jeffrey	United States Ambassador to Turkey; 2011–2014	Succeeded by John R. Bass
