= List of ambassadors of the United States to Jordan =

List of chiefs of mission from the United States to Jordan

Ambassador of the United States to Jordan
- سفارة الولايات المتحدة الأميركية في المملكة الأردنية الهاشمية
- Seal of the United States Department of State

- Flag of a United States ambassador

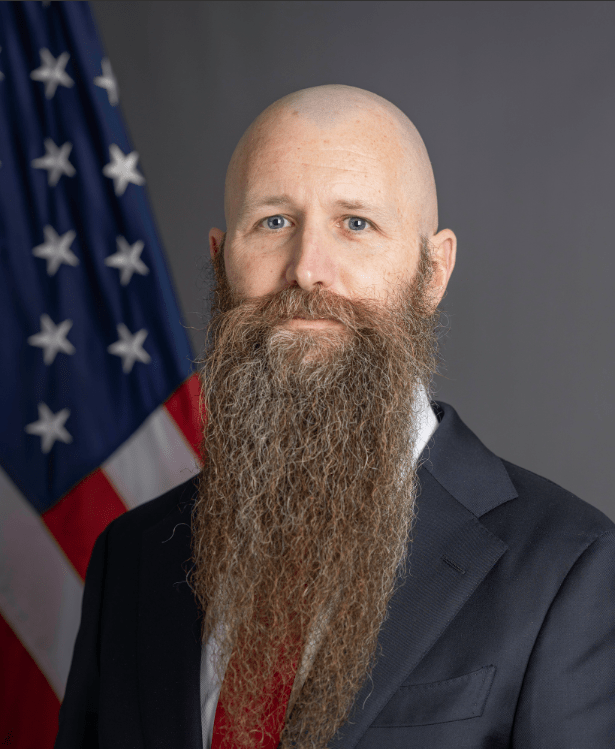
- Incumbent; James Holtsnider since December 7, 2025
- Nominator: The president of the United States
- Appointer: The president; with Senate advice and consent
- Inaugural holder: Gerald A. Drew as Envoy Extraordinary and Minister Plenipotentiary
- Formation: February 2, 1950
- Website: official website

The following is a list of chiefs of mission from the United States to Jordan.

The first chief of mission, Gerald A. Drew held the title of Envoy Extraordinary and Minister Plenipotentiary. The second chief of mission, Joseph C. Green, was appointed as an envoy but promoted to as Ambassador Extraordinary and Plenipotentiary, as the Legation Amman was raised to embassy status on August 27, 1952. Every chief of mission since has held the title of United States Ambassador.

Representative	Training	Title	Appointment	Presentation of credentials	Termination of mission	Reason
Gerald A. Drew	Foreign Service Officer	Envoy	February 2, 1950	February 24, 1950	February 25, 1952	Relinquished charge
Joseph C. Green	Non-career appointee	Envoy	May 14, 1952	July 31, 1952	1952	Promoted
Joseph C. Green	Non-career appointee	Ambassador	September 8, 1952	September 23, 1952	July 31, 1953	Appointment terminated
Lester D. Mallory	Foreign Service Officer	Ambassador	August 3, 1953	December 1, 1953	January 11, 1958	Relinquished charge
Parker T. Hart	Foreign Service Officer	Ambassador	February 5, 1958	Unknown	Unknown	Unknown
Sheldon T. Mills	Foreign Service Officer	Ambassador	February 16, 1959	March 12, 1959	March 18, 1961	Left post
William B. Macomber Jr.	Non-career appointee	Ambassador	March 2, 1961	April 5, 1961	December 25, 1963	Left post
Robert G. Barnes	Foreign Service Officer	Ambassador	March 4, 1964	March 15, 1964	April 23, 1966	Relinquished charge
Findley Burns Jr.	Foreign Service Officer	Ambassador	May 10, 1966	July 23, 1966	November 5, 1967	Left post
Harrison M. Symmes	Foreign Service Officer	Ambassador	October 18, 1967	November 21, 1967	May 7, 1970	Left post
L. Dean Brown	Foreign Service Officer	Ambassador	September 8, 1970	September 29, 1970	November 29, 1973	Left post
Thomas R. Pickering	Foreign Service Officer	Ambassador	February 27, 1974	March 2, 1974	July 13, 1978	Left post
Nicholas A. Veliotes	Foreign Service Officer	Ambassador	August 18, 1978	September 17, 1978	February 10, 1981	Left post
Richard Noyes Viets	Foreign Service Officer	Ambassador	July 27, 1981	August 10, 1981	August 5, 1984	Left post
Paul H. Boeker	Foreign Service Officer	Ambassador	August 13, 1984	September 1, 1984	August 13, 1987	Left post
Roscoe S. Suddarth	Foreign Service Officer	Ambassador	July 31, 1987	September 16, 1987	July 27, 1990	Left post
Roger Gran Harrison	Foreign Service Officer	Ambassador	June 27, 1990	August 7, 1990	July 9, 1993	Left post
Wesley Egan	Foreign Service Officer	Ambassador	February 11, 1994	March 19, 1994	July 13, 1998	Left post
William J. Burns	Foreign Service Officer	Ambassador	June 29, 1998	August 9, 1998	June 7, 2001	Relinquished charge
Edward Gnehm	Foreign Service Officer	Ambassador	August 7, 2001	September 20, 2001	July 12, 2004	Left post
David M. Satterfield	Foreign Service Officer	Ambassador	May 12, 2004	N/A	N/A	N/A
David Hale	Foreign Service Officer	Ambassador	November 2, 2005	November 7, 2005	July 9, 2008	Left post
Robert S. Beecroft	Foreign Service Officer	Ambassador	June 6, 2008	August 14, 2008	June 4, 2011	Left post
Stuart E. Jones	Foreign Service Officer	Ambassador	June 1, 2011	September 5, 2011	August 14, 2014	Left post
Alice Wells	Foreign Service Officer	Ambassador	June 19, 2014	August 31, 2014	March 24, 2017	Left post
Henry T. Wooster	Foreign Service Officer	Chargé d'affaires	March 24, 2017	N/A	July 30, 2018	
Paul Malick	Foreign Service Officer	Chargé d'affaires	July 30, 2018	N/A	March 14, 2019	
Karen Sasahara	Foreign Service Officer	Chargé d'affaires	March 14, 2019		August 30, 2020	
Mike Hankey	Foreign Service Officer	Chargé d'affaires	August 30, 2020		October 18, 2020	
Henry T. Wooster	Foreign Service Officer	Ambassador	August 6, 2020	October 18, 2020	July 16, 2023	Left post
Rohit Nepal	Foreign Service Officer	Chargé d'affaires	July 17, 2023		September 3, 2023	
Yael Lempert	Foreign Service Officer	Ambassador	July 27, 2023	September 3, 2023	January 20, 2025	Resigned
Rohit Nepal	Foreign Service Officer	Chargé d'affaires	January 20, 2025		June 29, 2025	Left post
Peter Shea	Foreign Service Officer	Chargé d'affaires	June 29, 2025		October 23, 2025	
James Holtsnider	Foreign Service Officer	Ambassador	October 7, 2025	December 7, 2025	Present	

== See also ==
- Jordan – United States relations
- Foreign relations of Jordan
- Ambassadors of the United States
- Embassy of Jordan, Washington, D.C.
- List of Jordanian ambassadors to the United States
