= Roscoe S. Suddarth =

American career diplomat

Roscoe Suddarth

Inspector General of the Department of State Acting
- In office February 15, 1994 – June 12, 1994
- President: George W. Bush
- Preceded by: Sherman Funk
- Succeeded by: Harold Geisel (Acting)

United States Ambassador to Jordan
- In office September 16, 1987 – July 27, 1990
- President: Ronald Reagan; George H. W. Bush
- Preceded by: Paul H. Boeker
- Succeeded by: Roger Harrison

Personal details
- Born: Roscoe Seldon Suddarth; August 5, 1935 Louisville, Kentucky, U.S.
- Died: June 29, 2013 (aged 77) Washington, D.C., U.S.
- Education: Yale University (BA); New College, Oxford (BA); Massachusetts Institute of Technology; University of Maryland, College Park (MM)

Roscoe Seldon "Rocky" Suddarth (August 5, 1935 – June 29, 2013) was an American career diplomat. Suddarth was a Foreign Service Officer and served as United States Ambassador to Jordan from 1987 to 1990. He served as the secretary of the American Academy of Diplomacy until his death.

== Career ==
Suddarth graduated from Yale University, where he was a member of Scroll and Key Society, with a Bachelor of Arts in 1956 and from New College, Oxford with a Bachelor of Arts (promoted to a Master of Arts per tradition) in modern history in 1958, studied systems analysis at Massachusetts Institute of Technology, and a master in Music from the University of Maryland in 2012. He served in the Air National Guard from 1958 to 1961.

Suddarth joined the United States Foreign Service in 1961 and served as third secretary at the U.S. Embassy in Bamako, Mali, from 1961 to 1963. From 1963 to 1965, he took Arabic language training at the Foreign Service Institute at the U.S. Embassy in Beirut, Lebanon. From there he was assigned first as second secretary to the U.S. Embassy in Sana'a, Yemen Arab Republic from 1965 to 1967, and then to the U.S. Embassy in Tripoli, Libya from 1967 to 1970.

Suddarth returned to State Department Headquarters as the Libyan desk officer until 1972, when he took university training at the Massachusetts Institute of Technology, graduating with a Master of Science in 1972. From 1972 to 1973, he served as politico-military officer in the Bureau of Politico-Military Affairs in the Department of State, to be followed as deputy chief of mission at the U.S. Embassy in Amman, Jordan from 1975 to 1979.

Suddarth became Executive Assistant to the Under Secretary of State for Political Affairs from 1979 to 1981. He then participated in the senior seminar for a year before becoming deputy chief of mission at the U.S. Embassy in Riyadh, Saudi Arabia. From 1985 to 1987 Suddarth was Deputy Assistant Secretary of State for Near Eastern and South Asian Affairs.

President Ronald Reagan nominated Suddarth to be United States Ambassador to Jordan on July 31, 1987. Confirmed by the Senate, he presented his credentials on September 16, 1987. Suddarth left the post on July 27, 1990.

Suddarth was Deputy Inspector General of the Department of State from 1991 to 1994 and International Affairs Advisor and Professor at the Naval War College in Newport, Rhode Island from 1993 to 1994. He retired from the Foreign Service in June 1995 with the rank of Career Minister.

After retiring Suddarth became president of the Middle East Institute. Suddarth also served as president of the American-Iranian Council as on the Board of Advisors of the Center for Contemporary Arab Studies at the Edmund A. Walsh School of Foreign Service at Georgetown University.

In 2008 Suddarth received his master's degree in music from the University of Maryland, College Park; his thesis was "French Stewardship of Jazz: The Case of French Musique and French Culture."

Suddarth was articulate in Arabic, French, and Spanish. He had two children with wife of fifty years, Michele.

Diplomatic posts
Preceded by Paul H. Boeker	United States Ambassador to Jordan; 1987–1990	Succeeded by Roger Harrison
