= R. Stephen Beecroft =

American diplomat

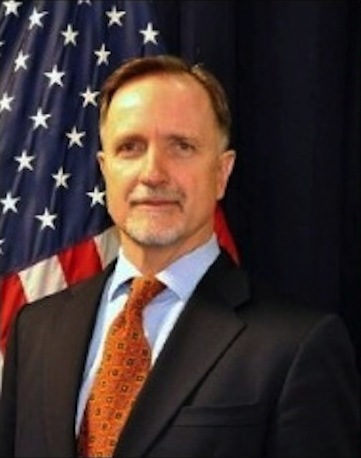

United States Ambassador to Egypt
- In office February 14, 2015 – June 30, 2017
- President: Barack Obama; Donald Trump
- Deputy: Thomas H. Goldberger
- Preceded by: Anne W. Patterson
- Succeeded by: Jonathan R. Cohen

United States Ambassador to Iraq
- In office October 11, 2012 – September 27, 2014
- President: Barack Obama
- Preceded by: James Franklin Jeffrey
- Succeeded by: Stuart E. Jones

United States Ambassador to Jordan
- In office August 14, 2008 – June 4, 2011
- President: George W. Bush; Barack Obama
- Preceded by: David Hale
- Succeeded by: Stuart E. Jones

Personal details
- Born: 1957 (age 68–69)
- Education: Brigham Young University (BA); UC Berkeley School of Law (JD)

Robert Stephen "Steve" Beecroft (born 1957) is an American diplomat and attorney. He served as United States Ambassador to Egypt from December 2014 to June 2017. He previously served as United States Ambassador to Iraq and United States Ambassador to Jordan.

== Education ==
Beecroft earned a B.A. from Brigham Young University and a J.D. from the University of California, Berkeley. A member of the Church of Jesus Christ of Latter-day Saints, he was a Mormon missionary in Venezuela.

== Career ==
After graduating from law school, Beecroft practiced law in the San Francisco office of an international law firm.

He joined the United States Foreign Service in 1994. He carried out an assignment in Washington, D.C. as Executive Assistant to two Secretaries of State Colin Powell and Condoleezza Rice, and Special Assistant to the Deputy Secretary of State. He also held assignments in the Department of State's Executive Secretariat and its Bureau of Near Eastern Affairs. Overseas he has served at the U.S. embassies in Amman, Riyadh, and Damascus. He served as Ambassador to the Hashemite Kingdom of Jordan from August 2008 until June 2011.

He joined the U.S. embassy in Baghdad, Iraq, as Deputy Chief of Mission on July 14, 2011. He became Charge d'Affaires upon the departure of Ambassador James Franklin Jeffrey on June 1, 2012. On September 11, 2012, the White House Press Office announced that President Barack Obama had nominated Beecroft to the U.S. Senate to succeed Jeffrey as the United States Ambassador to Iraq in the wake of the withdrawal of the nomination of Brett McGurk. He was confirmed by the Senate on September 22 and sworn in on October 9, 2012.

He is a recipient of the Department of State's Meritorious, Superior, and Distinguished Honor Awards and in April 2011 received the Diplomacy in Human Rights award.

=== U.S. Ambassador to Egypt ===
Beecroft's nomination came shortly after the 2013 Egyptian coup d'état. At the time, U.S. officials had repeatedly criticized the army-backed interim Egyptian government in dealing violently with opponents, especially those associated with the Muslim Brotherhood - banned after the military coup - and for allowing the courts to issue death sentences on hundreds of opponents. It was expected that the Obama administration would nominate Robert Ford, who was a senior U.S. diplomat in the Syrian crisis to the post of ambassador in Cairo, but U.S. officials said that the Egyptian government had indicated that they saw Ford as close to Islamic parties in the Middle East.

In late-April 2014, the United States decided to lift the partial ban imposed on the military aid to Egypt - after the military coup - and the Pentagon delivered ten Apache helicopters to Egypt, and that followed the Egyptian Foreign Minister Nabil Fahmy visit to Washington.

On the same day Beecroft was nominated (May 9, 2014), the former Israeli Prime Minister Ehud Barak called on the United States to support the presidential candidate Abdel Fattah al-Sisi in Egypt, the Field Marshal leader of the coup d'état, during the elections and not to criticize him openly, and to postpone any differences with him until after he took office. Barak said in the 2014 speech to the Washington Institute for Near East Policy that "The United States must sometimes waive defending the values of freedom and democracy to protect its interests." He added that he felt happy after the intervention of the army and the arrest of deposed President Mohamed Morsi and setting the ousted President Hosni Mubarak freed from prison.

The U.S. Senate confirmed Beecroft to the post on June 26, 2014.

Diplomatic posts
Preceded by David Hale	United States Ambassador to Jordan; 2008–2011	Succeeded by Stuart Jones
Preceded by James Jeffrey	United States Ambassador to Iraq; 2012–2014	Succeeded by Stuart Jones
Preceded by Anne Patterson	United States Ambassador to Egypt; 2015–2017	Succeeded by Thomas H. Goldberger (Chargé d'affaires)
