= Morton Howell =

Morton Howell may refer to:

- Morton B. Howell (1834–1909), American Masonic leader, lawyer and mayor of Nashville, Tennessee
- J. Morton Howell (1863–1937), American diplomat
