= Frank G. Wisner =

American diplomat and politician (1938–2025)

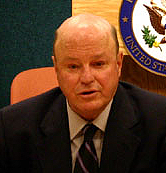
- Wisner in 2007

Acting United States Secretary of State
- In office January 20, 1993
- President: Bill Clinton
- Preceded by: Arnold Kanter (acting)
- Succeeded by: Warren Christopher

United States Ambassador to India
- In office June 9, 1994 – July 12, 1997
- President: Bill Clinton
- Preceded by: Thomas R. Pickering
- Succeeded by: Richard F. Celeste

Under Secretary of Defense for Policy
- In office 1993–1994
- President: Bill Clinton
- Preceded by: Paul Wolfowitz
- Succeeded by: Walter B. Slocombe

10th Under Secretary of State for International Security Affairs
- In office 1992–1993
- President: George H. W. Bush
- Preceded by: Reginald Bartholomew
- Succeeded by: Lynn Etheridge Davis

United States Ambassador to the Philippines
- In office August 16, 1991 – June 10, 1992
- President: George H. W. Bush
- Preceded by: Nicholas Platt
- Succeeded by: Richard H. Solomon

United States Ambassador to Egypt
- In office August 18, 1986 – June 6, 1991
- President: Ronald Reagan; George H. W. Bush
- Preceded by: Nicholas A. Veliotes
- Succeeded by: Robert Pelletreau

United States Ambassador to Zambia
- In office August 2, 1979 – April 19, 1982
- President: Jimmy Carter; Ronald Reagan
- Preceded by: Stephen Low
- Succeeded by: Nicholas Platt

Personal details
- Born: Frank George Wisner II; July 2, 1938 New York City, U.S.
- Died: February 24, 2025 (aged 86) Mill Neck, New York, U.S.
- Spouses: Genevieve Jeanne Marie du Fresne de Virel (m. 1969; died 1974); Christine de Ganay (m. 1976; div. 2013); Judy C. Cormier (m. 2015)
- Children: 4
- Education: Bachelor of Arts, Princeton University (1961)

Frank George Wisner II (July 2, 1938 – February 24, 2025) was an American businessman and diplomat who served as United States Secretary of State following the resignation of the previous acting United States Secretary of State Arnold Kanter at noon on January 20, 1993 until the confirmation by the United States Senate and swearing in of Warren Christopher as United States Secretary of State later that day. On January 31, 2011, he was sent to Egypt by President Barack Obama to negotiate a resolution to the popular protests against the regime that had swept the country. A White House spokesman said that Wisner had vast experience in the region as well as close relationships with many Egyptians in and out of government. The New York Times reported that he was a personal friend of former Egyptian president Hosni Mubarak.

Wisner worked as an international-affairs advisor at the firm of Squire Patton Boggs in Washington, D.C.

== Life and career ==
Wisner was born in New York City on July 2, 1938, the son of Mary Knowles Fritchey, a philanthropist, and CIA official Frank Wisner (1909–1965). He joined the United States Department of State as a Foreign Service Officer in December 1961.

He was assigned as a vice consul at the American Consulate General in Tangier, Morocco. He served as third secretary at the U.S. Embassy in Algiers, Algeria. In 1964 he became a rural development officer at the U.S. Embassy in Saigon, South Vietnam, for the Agency for International Development. He served in South Vietnam until 1969, when he returned to the State Department as officer in charge of Tunisian affairs. From 1971 to 1973, he was first secretary at the U.S. Embassy in Tunis, Tunisia, and following that, from 1973 to 1974, he was first secretary at the U.S. Embassy in Dacca, Bangladesh. From 1974 to 1975, he was Director of the Office of Plans and Management in the Bureau of Public Affairs and in late 1975 became Deputy Director of the President's Indo-China Task Force in the Department.

In 1976, at the beginning of the Carter administration, he served under Cyrus Vance as Deputy Executive Secretary of the Department of State. Among his overseas assignments, Wisner served as the United States Ambassador to Zambia (1979–82); Egypt (1986–91), the Philippines (1991–92), and India, (1994–97).

During his tenure in Lusaka, he played the role of point man for the Constructive Engagement policy of assistant secretary of state for African affairs Chester Crocker. Wisner worked well with Zambian president Kenneth Kaunda and helped to rebuild bilateral relations between Zambia and the USA after a 1980 spy scandal at the U.S. embassy in Lusaka. Crocker's efforts contributed to the organization and successful discussions at the February 1984 Lusaka Conference regarding conflicts in Angola and Namibia.

After retiring from government service in 1997, Wisner joined the board at a subsidiary of Enron, the former energy company and served on the board of American International Group (AIG).

In late 2002, Wisner co-chaired an independent working group that developed a model for the United States' post-conflict role in Iraq, should an invasion occur. Their published recommendations included: the establishment of law and order through the retraining of the Iraqi army, focusing on the distribution of humanitarian assistance and reestablishment of vital services, and the importance of avoiding the appointment of exiled Iraqi opposition leaders to dominant positions in the new government.

Wisner was an advisory board member for the Partnership for a Secure America, a not-for-profit organization dedicated to recreating the bipartisan center in American national security and foreign policy. In 2012, he succeeded Paul A. Volcker as chairman of the board of trustees of International House, a cultural-exchange residence and program center in New York City. He also served on the advisory board of the National Security Network, and on the board of Refugees International. He went on to become a member of the board for EOG Resources. In June 2013, Wisner joined the advisory board of Ergo, a global intelligence and advisory firm. Wisner was chair of the board of directors of The Arab Gulf States Institute in Washington.

Frank Wisner was married to Christine de Ganay, the stepmother of Nicolas Sarkozy, the president of France from 2007 until 2012.

He was a member of the Metropolitan Club of Washington, D.C.

Wisner died from lung cancer in Mill Neck, New York, on February 24, 2025, at the age of 86.

== 2011 Egypt protests ==
In early 2011, President Obama, at the suggestion of Secretary of State Hillary Clinton, dispatched Wisner to deliver a face-to-face appeal to Hosni Mubarak that he should resign to allow for an orderly transition. Wisner was unsuccessful in convincing Mubarak to do so. Four days later, after a day in which Mubarak allies took violent reprisal against democracy activists, Wisner spoke to a security conference in Europe and called it "crucial" that Mubarak stay on in the interest of "stability." The State Department immediately disavowed his comments and said Wisner had not been serving as an envoy but as a conduit for certain administration views. Obama recalled his displeasure at Wisner's comments in his memoirs, stating that he directed Secretary Clinton to “tell Wisner I don’t give a damn about what capacity he’s speaking in—he needs to be quiet.”

Diplomatic posts
Preceded by Stephen Low	United States Ambassador to Zambia; 1979–1982	Succeeded by Nicholas Platt
Preceded by Nicholas A. Veliotes	United States Ambassador to Egypt; 1986–1991	Succeeded by Robert Pelletreau
Preceded by Nicholas Platt	United States Ambassador to the Philippines; 1991–1992	Succeeded by Richard H. Solomon
Preceded by Thomas R. Pickering	United States Ambassador to India; 1994–1997	Succeeded by Richard F. Celeste
