= Thomas C. Hubbard =

American diplomat (born 1943)

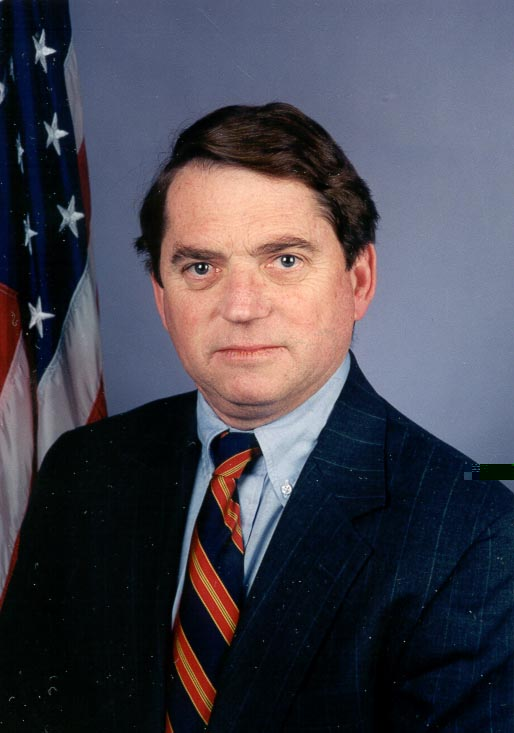
Thomas C. Hubbard

Thomas C. Hubbard (born 1943 in Kentucky) is a diplomat and former U.S. Ambassador to the Philippines (1996–2000) and South Korea (2001–04). He is currently a Senior Director for Asia at McLarty Associates and Chairman of The Korea Society.

Occupying senior State Department positions beginning in the mid-1980s, Ambassador Hubbard played a leading role in policies toward Japan, the Korean Peninsula and the ASEAN nations of Southeast Asia. He was a principal negotiator of the 1994 Agreed Framework aimed at ending North Korea's nuclear weapons program, and headed the first senior level US government delegation to North Korea. He also served as President Clinton's envoy to promote human rights and democracy in Burma and previously was Deputy Chief of Mission and Acting Ambassador to Malaysia. He is a member of the American Academy of Diplomacy. In 1969 he entered intensive Japanese language study at the Foreign Service Institute in Yokohama, Japan. Ambassador Hubbard was posted to Fukuoka, Japan as Economic/Commercial officer. In May 1971, following his assignment in Fukuoka, he was assigned to the Political Section of the U.S. Embassy in Tokyo.

From 1993 to 1996, he served as Deputy Assistant Secretary of State for East Asian and Pacific Affairs, and Principal Deputy Assistant Secretary from August 7, 2000, to July 10, 2001. His other overseas assignments included the U.S. Mission to the Organization for Economic Cooperation and Development in Paris and the U.S. embassies in Kuala Lumpur and Manila, where he was deputy chief of mission.

Ambassador Hubbard obtained his BA in political science from the University of Alabama in 1965. He has been awarded honorary doctorates by the University of Maryland and the University of Alabama and received the State Department's Superior Honor Award and the Meritorious Civilian Service Award and the Secretary of Defense Medal for Meritorious Civilian Service. He was selected to Phi Beta Kappa at the University of Alabama.

Diplomatic posts
Preceded by post created	United States Ambassador to Palau; 1996–2000	Succeeded by Francis J. Ricciardone Jr.
Preceded by John Negroponte	United States Ambassador to the Philippines; 1996–2000	Succeeded by Michael E. Malinowski
Preceded by Stephen W. Bosworth	United States Ambassador to South Korea; 2001–2004	Succeeded by Christopher R. Hill
Preceded by Rust Macpherson Deming	United States Principal Deputy Assistant Secretary of State for East Asian and Pacific Affairs; 2000–2001	Succeeded by Christopher J. LaFleur
