= Anne W. Patterson =

United States Department of State official and diplomat

Anne Patterson
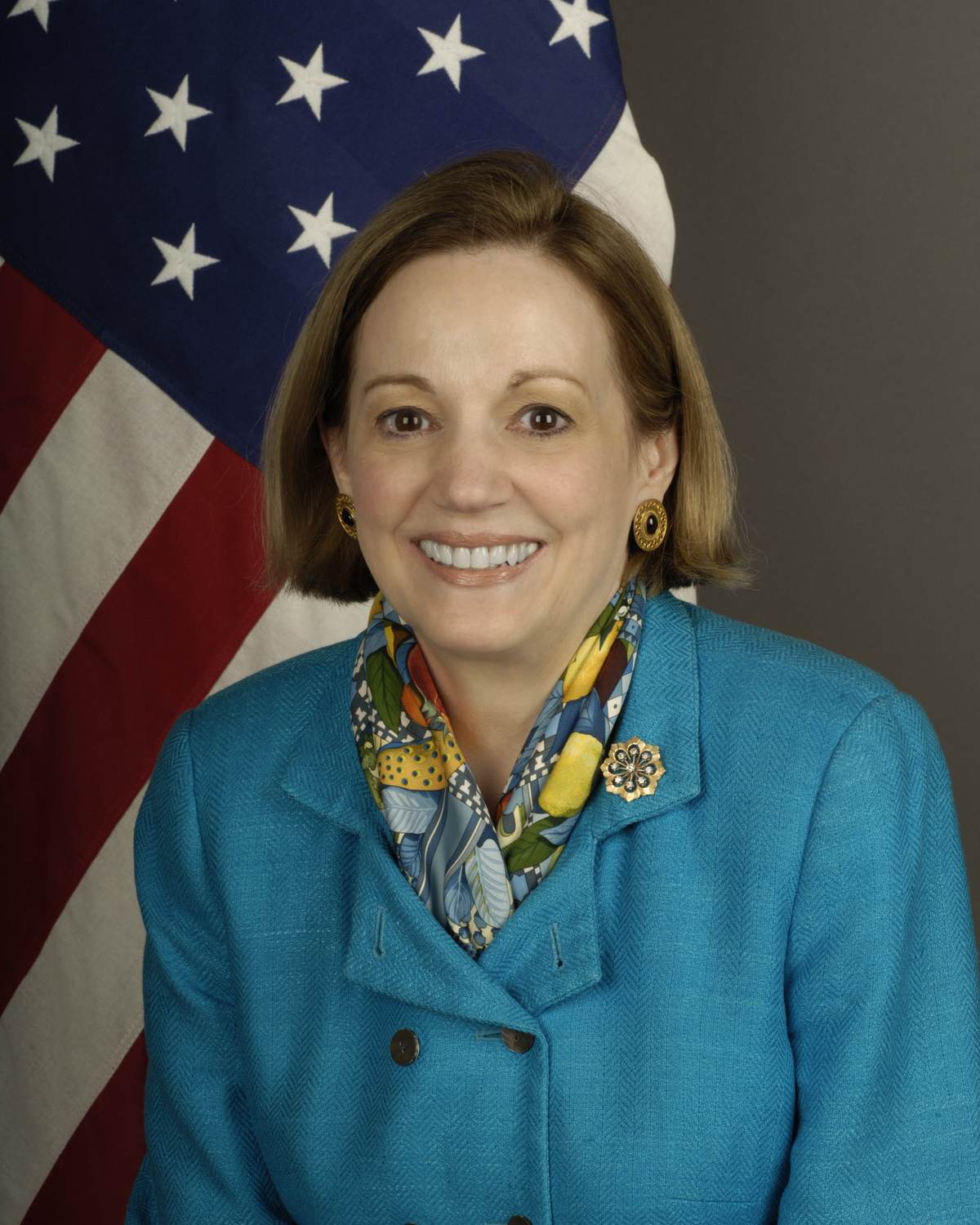
- Official portrait, 2011

23rd Assistant Secretary of State for Near Eastern Affairs
- In office December 23, 2013 – January 6, 2017
- President: Barack Obama
- Deputy: Gerald M. Feierstein
- Preceded by: Jeffrey D. Feltman
- Succeeded by: David Schenker

United States Ambassador to Egypt
- In office August 18, 2011 – August 31, 2013
- President: Barack Obama
- Preceded by: Margaret Scobey
- Succeeded by: Robert S. Beecroft

United States Ambassador to Pakistan
- In office July 31, 2007 – September 5, 2010
- President: George W. Bush; Barack Obama
- Preceded by: Ryan Crocker
- Succeeded by: Cameron Munter

United States Ambassador to the United Nations
- Acting
- In office January 20, 2005 – August 2, 2005
- President: George W. Bush
- Preceded by: John Danforth
- Succeeded by: John R. Bolton

9th Assistant Secretary of State for International Narcotics and Law Enforcement Affairs
- In office November 28, 2005 – June 22, 2007
- President: George W. Bush
- Preceded by: Robert B. Charles
- Succeeded by: David T. Johnson

Inspector General of the Department of State
- Acting
- In office September 28, 2003 – August 3, 2004
- President: George W. Bush
- Preceded by: Anne Sigmund (acting)
- Succeeded by: John E. Lange (acting)

United States Ambassador to Colombia
- In office August 24, 2000 – June 11, 2003
- President: Bill Clinton; George W. Bush
- Preceded by: Curtis Warren Kamman
- Succeeded by: William Braucher Wood

United States Ambassador to El Salvador
- In office May 16, 1997 – July 15, 2000
- President: Bill Clinton
- Preceded by: Alan Flanigan
- Succeeded by: Rose M. Likins

Personal details
- Born: Anne Woods; October 4, 1949 (age 77) Fort Smith, Arkansas, U.S.
- Spouse: David Patterson
- Children: 2
- Education: Wellesley College (BA); University of North Carolina, Chapel Hill (attended)

Anne Woods Patterson (born 1949) is an American diplomat and career Foreign Service Officer. She served as the Assistant Secretary of State for Near Eastern Affairs from 2013 to 2017. She previously served as United States Ambassador to Egypt until 2013 and as United States Ambassador to Pakistan from July 2007 to October 2010.

== Early life and education ==
Patterson was born in Fort Smith, Arkansas. She attended The Hockaday School in Dallas, Texas. She received her bachelor's degree from Wellesley College and attended graduate school at the University of North Carolina at Chapel Hill for one year.

== Career ==
Patterson entered the Foreign Service in 1973. She served as a U.S. State Department Economic Officer and Counselor to Saudi Arabia from 1984 to 1988 and then as a Political Counselor at the United States Mission to the United Nations in Geneva from 1988 to 1991.

Patterson served as State Department Director for the Andean Countries from 1991 to 1993. She served as Deputy Assistant Secretary for Inter-American Affairs from 1993 to 1996.

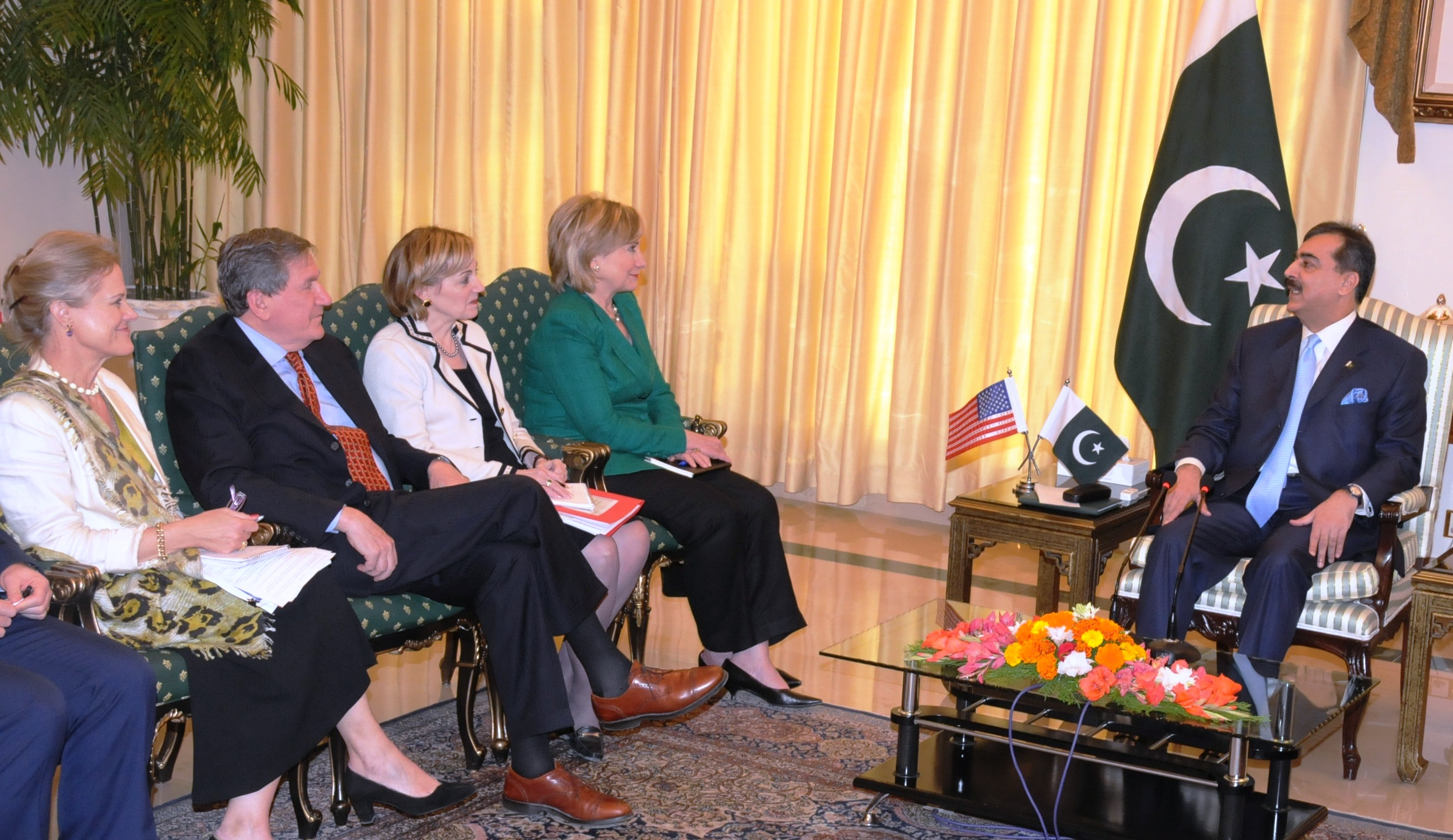
Patterson with Pakistani Prime Minister Yousaf Raza Gillani

Patterson served as United States Ambassador to El Salvador from 1997 to 2000, and then as United States Ambassador to Colombia from 2000 to 2003. While ambassador to Colombia, Patterson and U.S. Senator Paul Wellstone were the alleged targets of a failed bomb plot while on an official visit to the Colombian town of Barrancabermeja. From 2003 to 2004, she served as Deputy Inspector General of the US State Department.

In August 2004, Patterson was appointed Deputy U.S. Permanent Representative to the United Nations. Patterson became acting Permanent Representative to the United Nations after John Danforth resigned, effective January 20, 2005. An extended delay in the confirmation of John R. Bolton by the Senate (ending when Bolton assumed the position on August 1, 2005, after a recess appointment) caused Patterson to serve as interim permanent representative longer than expected.

Patterson became Assistant Secretary of State for International Narcotics and Law Enforcement Affairs on November 28, 2005, serving until May 2007. President George W. Bush appointed Patterson as the United States Ambassador to Pakistan after Ryan Crocker left that post to become Ambassador to Iraq. She served in Pakistan between July 2007 and October 2010.

In May 2011, U.S. President Obama nominated Patterson to be the U.S. Ambassador to Egypt. On June 30, 2011, the United States Senate confirmed Patterson by unanimous consent to be the United States Ambassador to Egypt.

During the protests that ousted Egyptian president Mohamed Morsi from power on July 3, 2013, Patterson was singled out specially by the protesters for being too close to Morsi and the Muslim Brotherhood. At the same time, she was attacked for presumably conspiring with the opposition, meeting with its leaders, and supporting the protests against the elected president.

On August 1, 2013, Patterson was nominated to serve as the assistant secretary of state in the State Department's Bureau of Near Eastern Affairs, which oversees the Middle East. The U.S. Senate confirmed Robert S. Beecroft to succeed her as ambassador to Egypt on June 26, 2014.

Patterson was considered for Defense Undersecretary for Policy under James Mattis; however, she was withdrawn after opposition from Tom Cotton, senator from Arkansas. Some speculated that Cotton favored an anti-Muslim Brotherhood policy and that Patterson's time as Ambassador to Egypt under President Morsi disqualified her in his eyes.

Patterson served on the commission on the National Defense Strategy for the United States and as the Kissinger Senior Fellow at the Yale University Jackson Institute for Global Affairs.

== Personal life ==
Patterson is married to David R. Patterson, a retired Foreign Service officer. The couple have two children.

Diplomatic posts
Preceded by Alan H. Flanigan	United States Ambassador to El Salvador; 1997–2000	Succeeded by Rose Likins
Preceded by Curtis Kamman	United States Ambassador to Colombia; 2000–2003	Succeeded by William Wood
Preceded by John Danforth	United States Ambassador to the United Nations; Acting; 2005	Succeeded by John Bolton
Preceded by Ryan Crocker	United States Ambassador to Pakistan; 2007–2010	Succeeded by Cameron Munter
Preceded by Margaret Scobey	United States Ambassador to Egypt; 2011–2013	Succeeded by Robert Beecroft
Political offices
Preceded by Robert Charles	Assistant Secretary of State for International Narcotics and Law Enforcement Affairs; 2005–2007	Succeeded by David Johnson
Preceded by Jeffrey Feltman	Assistant Secretary of State for Near Eastern Affairs; 2013–2017	Succeeded by Stuart E. Jones; Acting
