= John Hennessey-Niland =

American diplomat

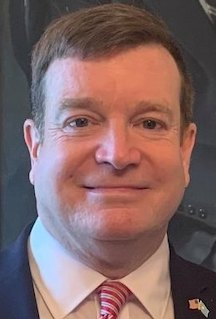

United States Ambassador to Palau
- In office March 6, 2020 – September 9, 2022
- President: Donald Trump; Joe Biden
- Preceded by: Amy J. Hyatt
- Succeeded by: Joel Ehrendreich

Personal details
- Education: Tufts University (BA); MALD (Fletcher School of Law and Diplomacy)

John Hennessey-Niland is an American diplomat who served as the United States ambassador to Palau from 2020 to 2022.

== Early life and education ==
Hennessey-Niland received his Bachelor of Arts at Tufts University, a Master of Arts in Law and Diplomacy at the Fletcher School of Law and Diplomacy, and a Diplome at France's École nationale d'administration.

== Career ==
Previously he was the Foreign Policy Advisor to United States Marine Corps Forces Pacific at Camp H. M. Smith, Hawaii, and the Political-Economic Chief at the United States Embassy in Suva, Fiji. Other diplomatic assignments include Deputy Chief of Mission and later Chargé d’Affaires at the Embassy of the United States, Dublin, Ireland; Director at the National Security Council for the G-20/G-7; and Director of International Narcotics and Law Enforcement at the Embassy of the United States, Islamabad, Pakistan.

On September 30, 2019, President Donald Trump nominated Hennessey-Niland to be the next United States ambassador to Palau. On February 11, 2020, his nomination was confirmed in the United States Senate by voice vote. He presented his credentials on March 6, 2020.

In March 2021, Hennessey-Niland traveled to Taiwan, alongside Palauan President Surangel Whipps Jr., who met with President Tsai Ing-wen. This made Hennessey-Niland the first sitting U.S. ambassador to visit Taiwan since the U.S. broke off formal diplomatic relations with Taiwan in 1979.

After retiring from his role as Ambassador, Hennessey-Niland joined the faculty at the Bush School of Government and Public Service at Texas A&M University as a Professor of Practice.

== Personal life ==
Hennessey-Niland speaks French and Dutch.

== Awards ==
Hennessey-Niland has received the Department of State Foreign Policy Advisors of the Year Award and the Navy Meritorious Civilian Service Medal.

== See also ==
- List of ambassadors of the United States
- List of ambassadors appointed by Donald Trump

Diplomatic posts
Preceded by Amy J. Hyatt	United States Ambassador to Palau; 2020–2022	Succeeded by Joel Ehrendreich
