= James Holtsnider =

American diplomat

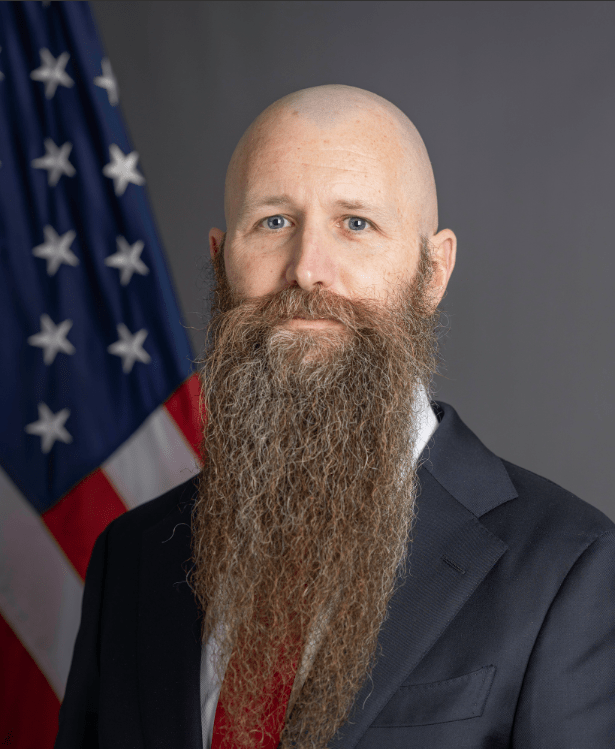
- Official portrait, 2025

26th United States Ambassador to Jordan
- Incumbent
- Assumed office December 7, 2025
- President: Donald Trump
- Preceded by: Yael Lempert

Chargé d'affaires to Samoa
- In office May 2, 2024 – January 3, 2025

Personal details
- Born: James William Holtsnider
- Education: University of Colorado Boulder (BA); Princeton University (MPP)

Military service
- Branch/service: U.S. Marine Corps
- Years of service: 1997–2004

James William Holtsnider is an American diplomat and former military service member officer who has served as United States ambassador to Jordan since 2025. Holtsnider served as senior bureau official for the Bureau of Political-Military Affairs in 2025.

In addition, he previously served as an operations officer in the Department's Operations Center, and as the deputy chief of mission of the United States Embassy in Kuwait City.

== Education and career ==
In July 1997, Holtsnider enlisted in the U.S. Marine Corps due to him needing a break from school. He served for six years, including as a Marine security guard at U.S. Embassies in Zimbabwe and Turkey. He later earned a Bachelors degree from the University of Colorado Boulder and a Masters degree from Princeton University. He served as an operations officer in the Department's operations center. He also served as Deputy Chief of Mission of the United States Embassy in Kuwait City. President Biden had nominated him to serve as U.S. ambassador to Samoa but the full 118th Senate never voted on the nomination.

Holtsnider was nominated by U.S President Donald Trump as the Ambassador to Jordan. In October 2025, he went to Jordan to meet Secretary General of Jordan's Foreign Ministry Daifallah Alfayez. There, they discussed strengthening bilateral relations between the U.S and Jordan. He presented his credentials to King Abdullah II of Jordan on December 7, 2025. In January 2026, he faced backlash after two prominent Jordanian families rejected his condolence visit requests. This reaction was attributed by Jordanian journalist Lamis Andoni to Jordanians’ outrage over U.S. support for Israel in the Gaza war.
