= Henry T. Wooster =

American diplomat

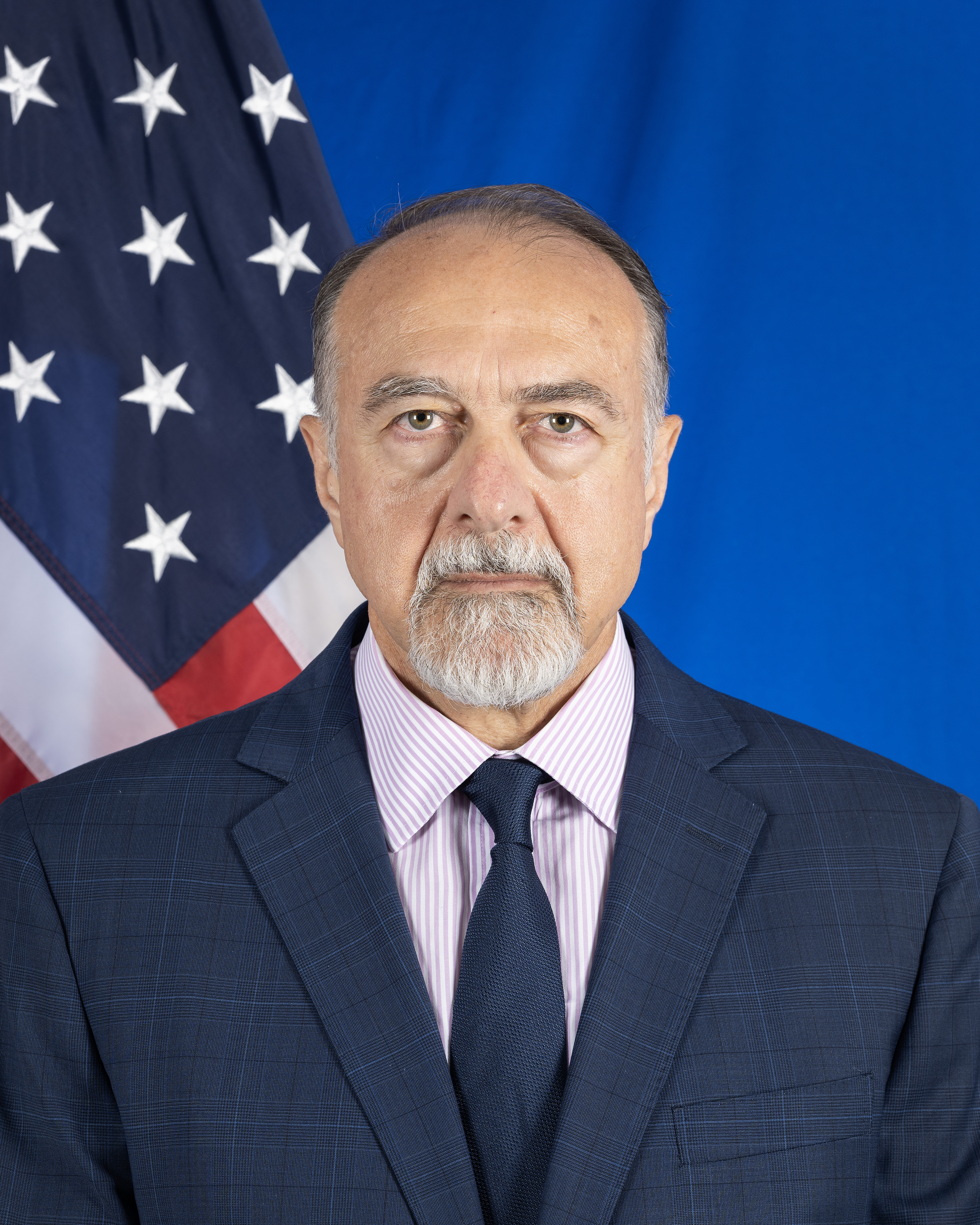
- Official portrait, 2023

Chargé d'Affaires to Haiti
- In office June 12, 2025 – July 29, 2026
- President: Donald Trump
- Preceded by: Dennis B. Hankins

United States Ambassador to Jordan
- In office October 18, 2020 – July 16, 2023
- President: Donald Trump; Joe Biden
- Preceded by: Mike Hankey (Chargé d'Affaires)
- Succeeded by: Yael Lempert
- In office March 24, 2017 – July 30, 2018 as Chargé d'Affaires
- President: Donald Trump
- Preceded by: Alice Wells
- Succeeded by: Paul Malick

Personal details
- Education: Amherst College (BA); Yale University (MA)

Military service
- Allegiance: United States
- Branch/service: United States Army
- Years of service: 1985–2009
- Unit: United States Army Reserve

Henry T. Wooster is an American diplomat who is the United States ambassador to Kenya. He previously served as the Chargé d’Affaires at the U.S. Embassy in Port-au-Prince, Haiti, and as the United States ambassador to Jordan from 2020 to 2023.

== Education and military service ==
Wooster earned a Bachelor of Arts from Amherst College and a Master of Arts from Yale University. He served as an Officer in the United States Army Reserve from 1985 to 2009.

== Foreign service career ==
He is a career member of the Senior Foreign Service, with the class of Minister-Counselor. On June 12, 2025, he began serving as the Chargé d'Affaires at the US Embassy in Haiti. He previously was Deputy Chief of Mission at the U.S. Embassy in Paris, France. He served as Deputy Chief of Mission and then Chargé d'Affaires at the U.S. Embassy in Amman, Jordan, from March 24, 2017 to July 30, 2018. He also served as Political Counselor at the U.S. Embassy in Islamabad, Pakistan, Director for Central Asia at the National Security Council, and the Foreign Policy Advisor to the Commanding General of the Joint Special Operations Command. Early in his career he worked as the Acting Deputy Assistant Secretary for Iran in the State Department's Bureau of Near Eastern Affairs and as the Director of the Office of Iranian Affairs in the State Department. His most recent position was as Deputy Assistant Secretary for the Maghreb and Egypt in the Bureau of Near Eastern Affairs of the State Department.

== United States Ambassador to Jordan ==
On November 13, 2019, President Donald Trump announced his intent to nominate Wooster to be the next United States Ambassador to Jordan. On November 19, 2019, his nomination was sent to the United States Senate. On May 13, 2020, a hearing on his nomination was held before the Senate Foreign Relations Committee. He was confirmed on August 6, 2020 by voice vote. He arrived in Jordan on September 18, 2020. He presented his credentials on October 18, 2020. Henry T. Wooster renewed on September 15, 2025, the continued diplomatic and material support provided by the United States to the Transition in Haiti.

== United States Ambassador to Kenya ==
On June 1, 2026, President Donald Trump nominated Wooster to serve as the next United States ambassador to the Republic of Kenya. On September 16, 2026, Wooster was confirmed as United States ambassador to the Republic of Kenya by the United States Senate.

== Personal life ==
He speaks French and Russian and has a working knowledge of Arabic, Persian, and Aramaic.

Diplomatic posts
Preceded by Alice Wells	United States Ambassador to Jordan as Chargé d'Affaires; 2017–2018	Succeeded by Karen Sasahara (Chargé d'Affaires)
Preceded by Mike Hankey (Chargé d'Affaires)	United States Ambassador to Jordan; 2020–2023	Succeeded by Yael Lempert
Preceded by Dennis B. Hankins	United States Ambassador to Haiti as Chargé d'Affaires; 2025–present	Incumbent
