= List of ambassadors of the United States to Palau =

Ambassador of the United States to Palau
- Seal of the United States Department of State

- Flag of a United States ambassador

- Incumbent; Shankar Rao; Chargé d'affaires since May 5, 2026
- Nominator: The president of the United States
- Appointer: The president; with Senate advice and consent
- Inaugural holder: Helen Reed-Rowe as Ambassador Extraordinary & Plenipotentiary
- Formation: September 27, 2010
- Website: U.S. Embassy - Koror

The United States ambassador to Palau is the official representative of the president of the United States to the head of state of Palau.

Until 1994 Palau had been a part of the United Nations Trust Territory of the Pacific Islands, administered by the United States. On May 25, 1994, the United Nations Security Council ended the trusteeship for the Palau district, and Palau became independent on October 1, 1994. The U.S. recognized Palau on the same day. Diplomatic relations between the U.S. and Palau were established on December 6, 1996, when U.S. Ambassador to the Philippines Thomas C. Hubbard was concurrently accredited to Palau and presented his credentials; he remained resident at Manila. The ambassadors to the Philippines continued to represent the U.S. until October 10, 2004, when the U.S. Embassy in Koror was established, with Deborah L. Kingsland as Chargé d’Affaires. The first ranking ambassador was commissioned to Koror in 2010.

== Ambassadors and chiefs of mission ==
Name	Title	Appointed	Presented credentials	Terminated mission	Notes
Thomas C. Hubbard – Career FSO	Ambassador Extraordinary and Plenipotentiary	July 2, 1996	December 6, 1996	Left Manila July 24, 2000	
Francis J. Ricciardone, Jr. – Career FSO	Ambassador Extraordinary and Plenipotentiary	February 21, 2002	July 6, 2002	October 10, 2004	The U.S. was represented by a series of Chargé d'Affaires 2004–2010.
Helen Reed-Rowe – Career FSO	Ambassador Extraordinary and Plenipotentiary	September 27, 2010	September 30, 2010	July 26, 2013	The U.S. was represented by a series of Chargé d'Affaires 2004–2010.
Amy J. Hyatt – Career FSO	Ambassador Extraordinary and Plenipotentiary	December 12, 2014	March 10, 2015	February 12, 2020	
John Hennessey-Niland - Career FSO	Ambassador Extraordinary and Plenipotentiary	February 14, 2020	March 6, 2020	September 9, 2022	
James Boughner - Career FSO	Chargé d'Affaires a.i.	September 9, 2022	N/A	September 29, 2023	
Joel Ehrendreich	Ambassador Extraordinary and Plenipotentiary	July 27, 2023	September 29, 2023	May 4, 2026	
Shankar Rao - Career FSO	Chargé d'Affaires a.i.	May 5, 2026	N/A	Incumbent	

== See also ==
- Palau – United States relations
- Foreign relations of Palau
- Ambassadors of the United States
