= Stuart E. Jones =

American diplomat

Stuart Jones
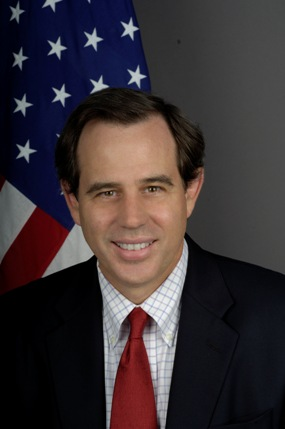
- Official portrait, 2011

Assistant Secretary of State for Near Eastern Affairs Acting
- In office January 9, 2017 – June 2017
- President: Barack Obama; Donald Trump
- Preceded by: Anne W. Patterson

United States Ambassador to Iraq
- In office October 2, 2014 – September 1, 2016
- President: Barack Obama
- Preceded by: Robert Beecroft
- Succeeded by: Douglas Silliman

United States Ambassador to Jordan
- In office September 5, 2011 – August 14, 2014
- President: Barack Obama
- Preceded by: Robert Beecroft
- Succeeded by: Alice Wells

Personal details
- Born: 1959 (age 66–67)
- Education: Duke University (BA); University of Pennsylvania Law School (JD)

Stuart E. Jones (born 1959) is an American diplomat, business executive and think tank leader. He previously served as the United States Ambassador to Iraq from 2014 to 2016, and as the United States Ambassador to Jordan from July 21, 2011 to July 28, 2014.

== Biography ==
Stuart E. Jones graduated from Duke University and received a J.D. from the University of Pennsylvania Law School.

He joined the United States Foreign Service as a career diplomat. He served as Governorate Coordinator in Al Anbar Province in Iraq, and at the National Security Council as Country Director for Iraq. From 1994 to 1996, he was special assistant to the U.S. Permanent Representative to the United Nations. He has also served in Turkey, El Salvador and Colombia.

From 2005 to 2008, Jones served as Deputy Chief of Mission at the American Embassy in Cairo, Egypt. From 2008 to 2010, he served as Deputy Assistant Secretary of State at the State Department's Bureau of European and Eurasian Affairs. Jones also served as Deputy Chief of Mission at the American Embassy in Baghdad.

On July 21, 2011, Jones was appointed United States Ambassador to Jordan.

On May 8, 2014, President Obama nominated Jones to be the United States Ambassador to Iraq. On June 26, 2014, the U.S. Senate confirmed Jones in a 93–0 vote. He was sworn in by United States Secretary of State John Kerry on September 17, 2014.

Between 2018 - 2024, Jones was an executive with Bechtel Corporation, the global engineering, construction and project management firm.

In January 2025, Jones was appointed as President of the Middle East Institute.

Diplomatic posts
Preceded by Robert Beecroft	United States Ambassador to Jordan; 2011–2014	Succeeded by Alice Wells
Preceded by Robert Beecroft	United States Ambassador to Iraq; 2014–2016	Succeeded by Douglas Silliman
