= Alice Wells =

American diplomat

Alice G. Wells
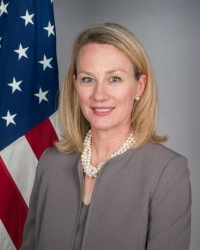

Acting Assistant Secretary of State for South and Central Asian Affairs
- In office June 26, 2017 – June 20, 2020
- President: Donald Trump
- Preceded by: William E. Todd (acting)
- Succeeded by: Dean R. Thompson (acting)

United States Ambassador to Jordan
- In office July 28, 2014 – March 24, 2017
- President: Barack Obama; Donald Trump
- Preceded by: Stuart E. Jones
- Succeeded by: Henry T. Wooster

Personal details
- Born: 1963 (age 62–63) Beirut, Beirut Governorate, Lebanon
- Spouse: Kurt E. Amend
- Children: 3
- Education: Stanford University; UCLA

Alice G. Wells is an American diplomat and former Ambassador of the United States of America to Jordan. She now is the executive Vice President of ExxonMobil Europe.

== Early life and education ==
Wells was born in Beirut, Lebanon to Heidi and Wes Wells. Her father was at the time a U.S. Army officer stationed there as part of President Eisenhower's 1958 Middle East Task Force. After attending Bainbridge Island High School, she earned a BA from Stanford University in 1985 and a joint MA from the University of California at Los Angeles/Rand Corporation.

== Career ==
Wells is a career member of the U.S. Foreign Service. Wells served as a political officer and a political-military officer at the US embassy in Riyadh, Saudi Arabia, as well as a political and economic officer at the US embassy in Dushanbe, Tajikistan. She was acting director of Egypt and North African Affairs in the bureau of Near Eastern affairs from 2003 to 2005. She served as minister counsellor for political affairs at the US embassy in Moscow from 2006 to 2009 and was director of Maghreb affairs. Wells also served as executive assistant to Secretary of State Hillary Clinton from 2011 to 2012, and to Undersecretary for Political Affairs William J. Burns from 2009 to 2011. She served as an assessor at the foreign service board of examiners in 2013 and was special assistant to the president for Russia and Central Asia in the White House from 2012 to 2013.

When nominated to become the U.S. Ambassador to Jordan, she was serving as senior adviser in the bureau of Near Eastern affairs at the Department of State. She began her assignment as ambassador on July 28, 2014. In January 2016 Wells announced at a press briefing in Amman that the US Congress has approved “an unprecedented” $1.275 billion in assistance to Jordan in its 2016 budget bill. The amount includes economic aid, security assistance and assistance with the country's water supply. Wells noted that the aid was approved with bi-partisan support of Republicans and Democrats.

President Donald Trump removed her as Ambassador, at the request of King Abdullah II.

She was then appointed Acting Assistant Secretary of State for South and Central Asian Affairs.

== Personal ==
Wells speaks English, Russian and has studied Arabic, Urdu and Hindi. She is married to Kurt E. Amend. Together, they have three children.

Diplomatic posts
Preceded by Stuart E. Jones	United States Ambassador to Jordan; 2014–2017	Succeeded by Henry T. Wooster (as Chargé d'Affaires)
