= Nicholas A. Veliotes =

American diplomat (1928–2024)

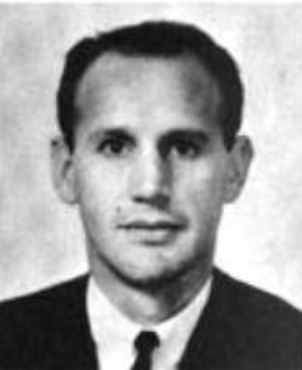
- Nicholas A. Veliotes, from a 1962 publication of the U.S. State Department
- Born: October 28, 1928; Oakland, California, U.S.
- Died: May 14, 2024 (aged 95)
- Known for: U.S. Ambassador to Jordan and Egypt

Nicholas A. Veliotes

13th Assistant Secretary of State for Near Eastern and South Asian Affairs
- In office May 21, 1981 – October 27, 1983
- Preceded by: Harold H. Saunders
- Succeeded by: Richard W. Murphy

Nicholas Alexander Veliotes (Greek: Νικόλαος Αλέξανδρος Βελιώτης; October 28, 1928 – May 14, 2024) was a Greek-American United States Foreign Service Officer and diplomat. He served as United States Ambassador to Jordan (1978–81) and Egypt (1984–86) and Assistant Secretary of State (1981-84). He was a member of the American Academy of Diplomacy and Council on Foreign Relations.

== Early life ==
Veliotes was born in Oakland, California, on October 28, 1928, to Greek immigrants. He had an older brother, the Rock and Roll Hall of Famer Johnny Otis. He served in the U.S. Army from 1946 to 1948 and then went on to graduate from the University of California, Berkeley (B.A., 1952; M.A., 1954) where he played football and rugby.

== Diplomatic career ==
Veliotes joined the U.S. Foreign Service in 1955. He served as consular officer in Naples in 1955-57 and economic officer in Rome in 1957-60 before returning to the U.S. to work in the Secretariat and then in the Bureau of Cultural and Educational Affairs from 1962 to 1964. He then served as political officer New Delhi (1964–66) and Vientiane (1966–69) before being selected as a Woodrow Wilson Fellow at Princeton University in 1969.

Veliotes was Special Assistant to the Deputy Secretary of State (1970–73), then served as Deputy Chief of Mission in Tel Aviv, returning to the Department of State as Deputy Director of the Policy Planning Staff (1976–77) and then Deputy Assistant Secretary of State for Near Eastern and South Asian Affairs (1977–78). He was Ambassador to Jordan (1978–81) and Assistant Secretary of State for Near Eastern and South Asian Affairs (1981–84). He then served as Ambassador to Egypt until his retirement from the Foreign Service in April, 1986.

== Post-Foreign Service career ==
In May 1986, Veliotes became President of the Association of American Publishers and retired as President Emeritus in June 1997. He is also a member of the Middle East Institute, Foundation for Middle East Peace, and the Veterans of Foreign Wars. Veliotes has received the Glen T. Seaborg Award (the equivalent of a lifetime achievement award for former Cal football alumni), the B'nai Brith "Faith of Our Fathers" Award for contributions to peace in the Middle East, a number of Presidential and Departmental Honor Awards, and also the "Chevalier del Ordre des Arts et des Lettres" Award from the French Government for outstanding services to international publishers.

Veliotes served on the boards of Amideast and the American Academy of Diplomacy, as well as Chairman for the Hollings Center for International Dialogue. He died on May 14, 2024, at the age of 95.

== Service chronology ==
Position	Host country or organization	Year
Consular Officer	Naples, Rome	1955 to 1957
Economic Officer	Rome, Rome	1957 to 1959
Secretariat and Bureau of Cultural and Educational Affairs	U.S.	1962 to 1964
Political Officer	New Delhi, India	1964 to 1966
Political Officer	Vientiane, Laos	1966 to 1969
Special Assistant to the Deputy Secretary of State	U.S.	1970 to 1973
Deputy Chief of Mission	Tel Aviv, Israel	1973 to 1976
U.S. Ambassador	Amman, Jordan	1978 to 1981
Assistant Secretary of State for South Asia and the Near East	U.S.	1981 to 1984
U.S. Ambassador	Cairo, Egypt	1984 to 1986

Government offices
Preceded by Harold H. Saunders	Assistant Secretary of State for Near Eastern and South Asian Affairs; May 21, 1981 – October 27, 1983	Succeeded by Richard W. Murphy
Diplomatic posts
Preceded by Thomas R. Pickering	United States Ambassador to Jordan; September 17, 1978– February 10, 1981	Succeeded by Richard Noyes Viets
Preceded by Alfred L. Atherton, Jr.	United States Ambassador to Egypt; 1983–1986	Succeeded by Frank G. Wisner
