= Jonathan R. Cohen =

American diplomat

Jonathan Cohen
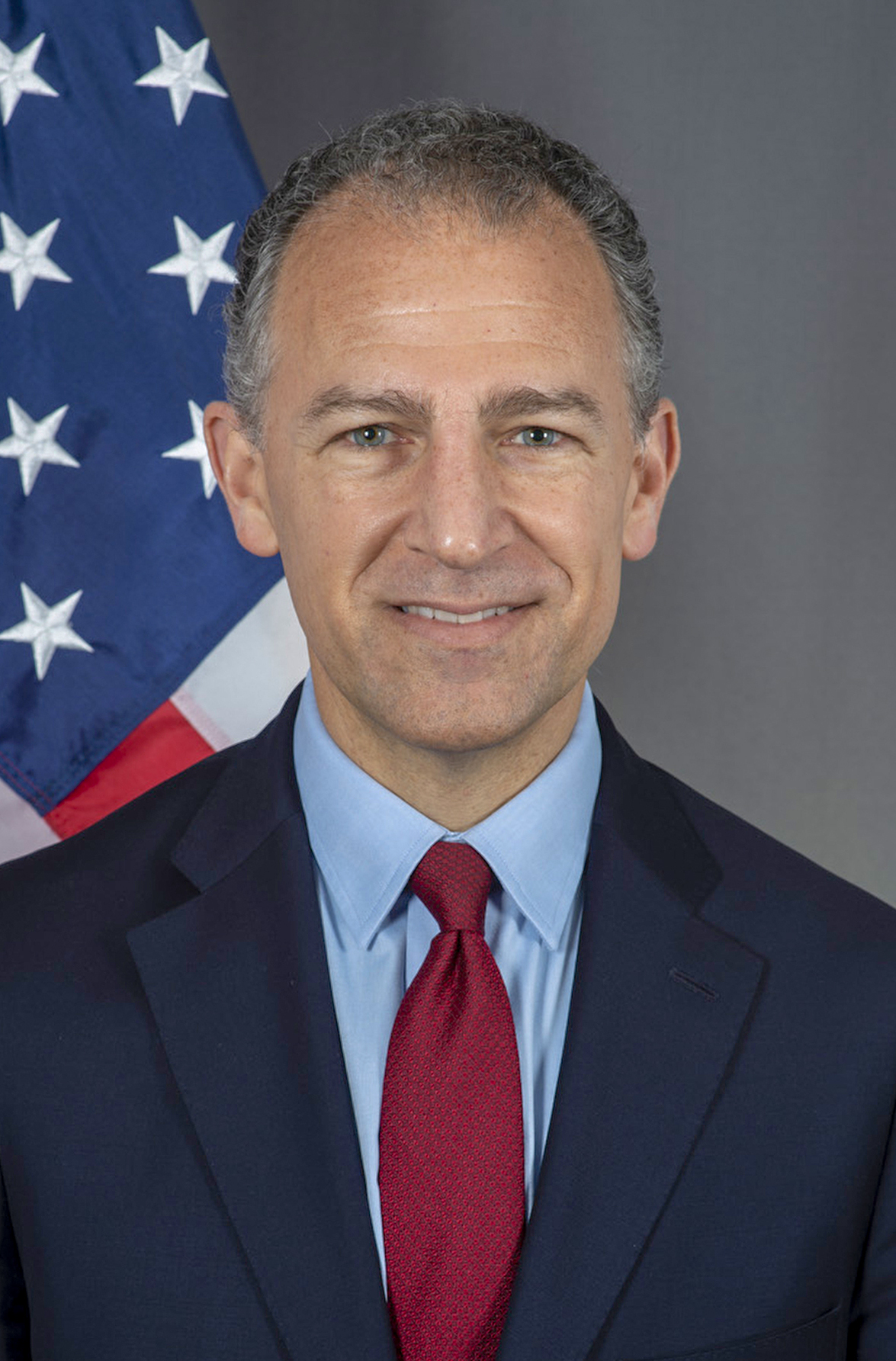
- Cohen in 2018

United States Ambassador to Egypt
- In office November 17, 2019 – March 31, 2022
- President: Donald Trump; Joe Biden
- Preceded by: Robert S. Beecroft
- Succeeded by: Herro Mustafa

United States Deputy Ambassador to the United Nations
- In office June 8, 2018 – November 17, 2019
- President: Donald Trump
- Preceded by: Kelley Eckels Currie (acting)
- Succeeded by: Richard M. Mills Jr.

United States Ambassador to the United Nations
- Acting
- In office January 1, 2019 – September 12, 2019
- President: Donald Trump
- Preceded by: Nikki Haley
- Succeeded by: Kelly Craft

Personal details
- Born: Jonathan Raphael Cohen Palo Alto, California, U.S.
- Education: Princeton University (BA); Georgetown University (attended)

Jonathan Raphael Cohen is an American diplomat and most recently served as the United States Ambassador to Egypt from November 17, 2019 to March 31, 2022. He previously served as the United States Deputy Representative to the United Nations. From August 2016 to June 2018 he served as a Deputy Assistant Secretary of State for European and Eurasian Affairs. He was nominated by President Donald Trump in early 2018 to become United States Deputy Representative to the United Nations and was unanimously confirmed by the Senate on May 24, 2018. On January 1, 2019, Cohen assumed acting duties of Ambassador to the United Nations following the resignation of Nikki Haley the previous day; with the installation of her successor Kelly Craft in September, he relinquished those duties.

On April 11, 2019, President Trump nominated Cohen to be Ambassador of the United States to Egypt. Cohen was confirmed by the Senate in August and presented his credentials to the Egyptian government on November 17, 2019.

== Early life and education ==
Cohen is the son of Harry B. Cohen (March 1, 1938 – August 21, 2013) and Adrienne M. Cohen. Jonathan and his younger brother Sascha were raised in Northern California, where their father was a colleague of William C. Dement at the Stanford University Center for Sleep Sciences And Medicine. Their father, who earned a doctorate in psychology from McGill University in 1963, left Stanford in 1972 to join the faculty of the University of California, Irvine School of Medicine. Harry Cohen later served as the director of mental health services for Orange County, California.

In 1985, Jonathan Cohen received a B.A. in politics from Princeton University. His senior thesis in Near Eastern Studies was entitled A Last Chance to Brighten the Faint Gleam of Peace: Direct Negotiations, the Arab Option for Regaining Sovereignty on the West Bank. After graduating from Princeton, Cohen studied at the Hebrew University of Jerusalem on a grant from the Israeli government, and later at Georgetown University.

== Career ==
Cohen has served in various diplomatic positions representing the United States, beginning in 1986 when he entered the Foreign Service Institute. He served as Deputy Chief of Mission at the U.S. Embassy in Nicosia, Cyprus, from 2008 to 2011, Minister Counselor for Political Affairs at the U.S. Embassy in Paris from 2011 to 2013, and also served as Deputy Chief of Mission at the U.S. Embassy in Baghdad, Iraq from 2013 to 2016. He also previously served in many roles in embassies or consulates in Bangkok, Jerusalem, Vienna, Stockholm, Ankara and Rome.

He was promoted to the position of Deputy Assistant Secretary of State for European and Eurasian Affairs, covering Cyprus, Greece and Turkey in August 2016. During his tenure as Deputy Assistant Secretary, Cohen met with Bartholomew I of Constantinople, and argued before the Commission on Security and Cooperation in Europe that the U.S. should work with Turkey to limit Iranian and Russian influence in the region.

On February 13, 2018, President Donald Trump formally nominated Cohen to serve as the Deputy Representative of the United States to the United Nations, set to succeed Michele Sison if confirmed by the United States Senate. Cohen was unanimously confirmed by the Senate on May 24, 2018 and was sworn in on June 8, 2018. On January 1, 2019, Cohen assumed acting duties of Ambassador to the United Nations following the resignation of Nikki Haley the previous day. He held the position until he was succeeded by Ambassador Kelly Craft.

On April 11, 2019, President Trump nominated Cohen to be Ambassador of the United States to Egypt. On August 1, 2019, the Senate confirmed his nomination by voice vote. He presented his credentials and took charge of the embassy upon his arrival to Egypt on November 17, 2019.

== Personal life ==
Cohen speaks French, Swedish, and Italian.

== See also ==
- List of current ambassadors of the United States
- List of ambassadors appointed by Donald Trump

Diplomatic posts
Preceded by Nikki Haley	United States Ambassador to the United Nations; Acting; 2019	Succeeded by Kelly Craft
Preceded by Robert S. Beecroft	United States Ambassador to Egypt; 2019–2022	Succeeded by Nicole Shampaine (Chargé d'affaires)
