= Amy J. Hyatt =

American diplomat

Amy Hyatt
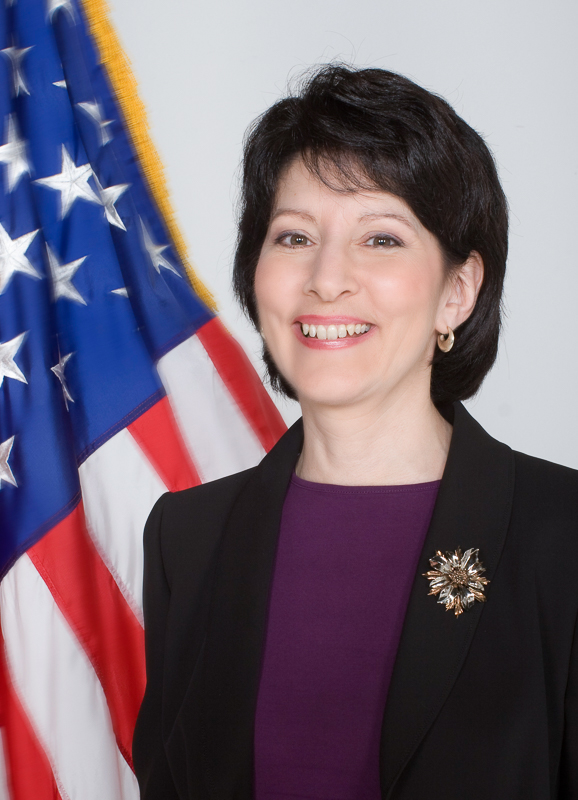

United States Ambassador to Palau
- In office March 10, 2015 – February 12, 2020
- President: Barack Obama; Donald Trump
- Preceded by: Helen Reed-Rowe
- Succeeded by: John Hennessey-Niland

Personal details
- Born: Amy Jane Hyatt; 1955 (age 70–71) New York City, New York, U.S.
- Education: Binghamton University; Stanford University; National Defense University

Amy Jane Hyatt (born 1955) is an American diplomat who served as United States Ambassador to Palau from 2015 to 2020. She was nominated by President Barack Obama and confirmed by the Senate in December 2014.

== Early life ==
Hyatt was born in Brooklyn and grew up in upstate New York. She attended Margaretville Central School in Margaretville, New York and graduated salutatorian of her high school class in 1973. She was a Rotary Exchange student to Norway. She attended Binghamton University, where she earned a B.A. Degree in political science and history. In 2016 the university awarded her the Edward Weisband Distinguished Alumna Award for Public Service or Contribution to Public Affairs. She has a J.D. from Stanford Law School and was admitted to the California State Bar in 1981.

== Career ==
Hyatt began her career as an attorney in San Francisco, focusing on litigation until 1985.

After she joined the Foreign Service, she served at several embassies including ones in Finland, Korea, Thailand, the Philippines, Norway, and the Czech Republic.

She earned an M.S.S. at the National War College at the National Defense University in 2000.

While in Washington, DC, she served as Political Analyst and as Post Management Officer for several East Asian posts. She then became the Diplomat in Residence at Arizona State University.

When she was nominated by president Barack Obama to serve as U.S. Ambassador to Palau, she was a Management Counselor at the U.S. Embassy in Cairo, Egypt. Along with seventeen other ambassador nominees, she found her approval by the Senate delayed by filibusters. She was confirmed by the Senate on December 12, 2014.

== Personal life ==
Hyatt has three adult children. In addition to English, she speaks fluent Norwegian.

== See also ==
- List of ambassadors of the United States

Diplomatic posts
Preceded by Helen Reed-Rowe	United States Ambassador to Palau; 2015–2020	Succeeded by John Hennessey-Niland
