= Yael Lempert =

American diplomat (born 1974)

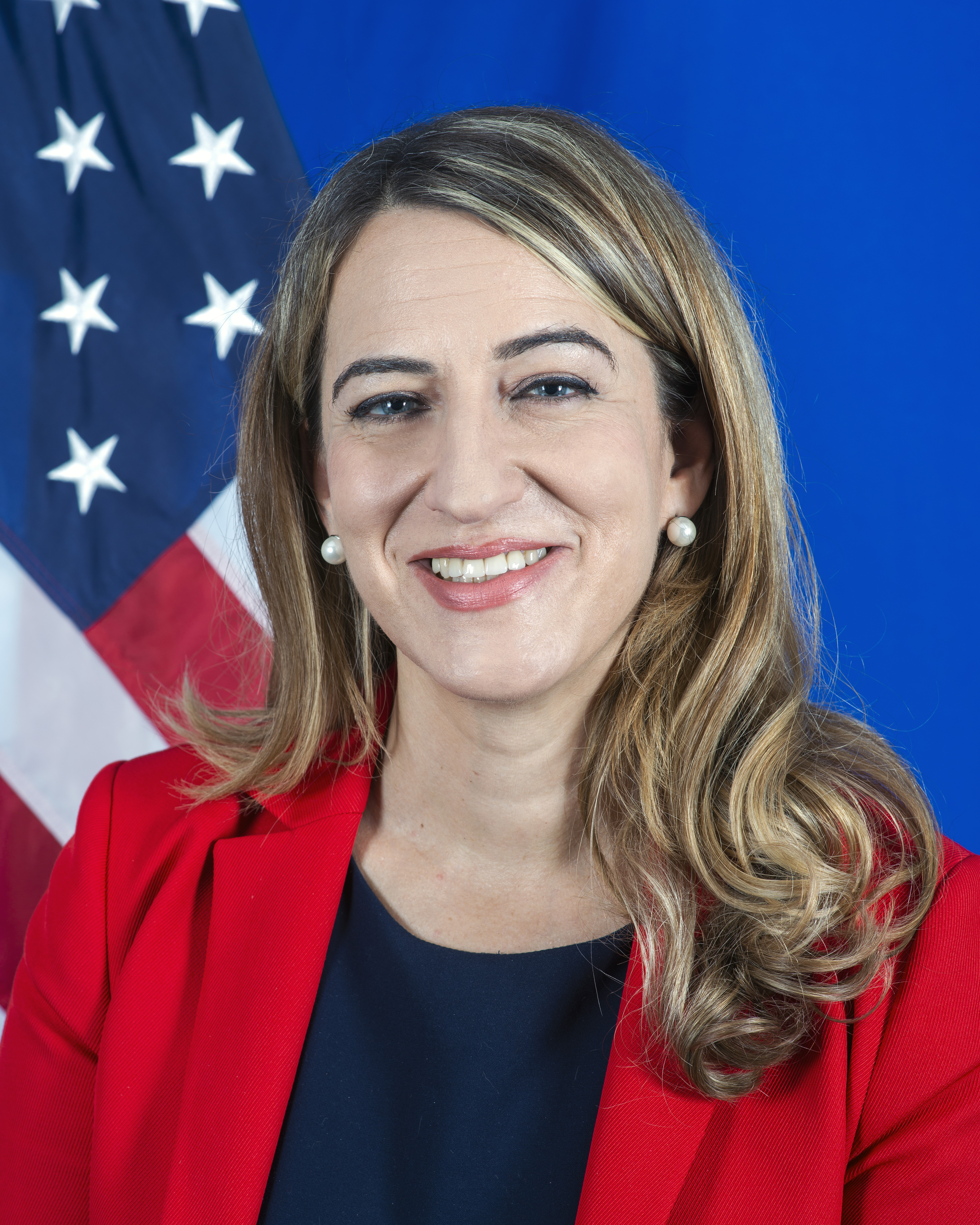

United States Ambassador to Jordan
- In office September 3, 2023 – January 20, 2025
- President: Joe Biden
- Preceded by: Henry T. Wooster
- Succeeded by: James Holtsnider

Assistant Secretary of State for Near Eastern Affairs
- Acting
- In office August 31, 2021 – May 31, 2022
- President: Joe Biden
- Preceded by: Joey R. Hood
- Succeeded by: Barbara A. Leaf

U.S. Chargé d'Affaires to the United Kingdom
- In office January 20, 2021 – August 1, 2021
- President: Joe Biden
- Preceded by: Woody Johnson
- Succeeded by: Philip T. Reeker (acting)

Personal details
- Born: January 16, 1974 (age 52)
- Spouse: Andrea Catalano di Melilli (m. 2008)
- Education: Georgetown University (BS)
- Awards: National Security Council Outstanding Service Award (2017); Presidential Rank Award (2019)

Yael Lempert (born January 16, 1974) is an American diplomat who served as the United States ambassador to Jordan from September 2023 to January 2025. Lempert is a career member of the Senior Foreign Service, having served in various roles including Senior Director for the Levant, Israel, and Egypt at the National Security Council, and Deputy Chief of Mission at the U.S. Embassy in London. In 2023, she was nominated by President Biden and confirmed by the Senate to be the ambassador to Jordan.

== Early life and education ==
Lempert grew up in Ithaca, New York. She graduated from the Walsh School of Foreign Service at Georgetown University. She is the daughter of ophthalmologist Philip Lempert and Lesley Lempert who serves on the board of the New York Civil Liberties Union. Lempert is Jewish.

== Career ==
Lempert is a career member of the Senior Foreign Service with the rank of Minister-Counselor. She is fluent in Arabic. She was Senior Director for the Levant, Israel, and Egypt at the National Security Council (NSC) from 2014 to 2017. She served as Special Assistant to the President from 2015 to 2017.

She was charged with "(heading) negotiations between the Netanyahu government and Obama administration over the military aid package, in addition to her work on the Israeli-Palestinian issue. The $38-billion deal, over 10 years, was the biggest the United States ever signed with any country."

Initially planning to return to the State Department after 20 years as a career diplomat, Lempert was asked to stay on for the transition and assembling of a new team in 2017 under Donald Trump. Trump officials thought that Lempert, with her "knowledge and experience", could help facilitate a deal between Israel and the Palestinians.

From June 1, 2017, until December 2018, Lempert served as acting deputy assistant secretary for Egypt and North Africa.

Lempert served as Deputy Chief of Mission at the U.S. Embassy in London from January 2019 to 2021, and as Chargé d'Affaires, a.i. from January 2021 through July 2021.

Lempert became the acting assistant secretary of the State Department's Bureau of Near Eastern Affairs on August 31, 2021.

=== U.S. ambassador to Jordan ===
On January 3, 2023, President Joe Biden nominated Lempert to be the ambassador to Jordan. After hearings and a favorable report from the Senate Foreign Relations Committee, her nomination was confirmed by the Senate on July 27, 2023. She was sworn in by Vice President Kamala Harris on August 9, 2023, and presented her credentials to King Abdullah II on September 3, 2023.

== Personal life ==
Lempert married Italian diplomat Andrea Catalano di Melilli in 2008 at the Italian Embassy in Cairo. She speaks Arabic.

Diplomatic posts
Preceded by Henry T. Wooster	United States Ambassador to Jordan; 2023–2025	Succeeded by Peter Shea
