= Alfred Atherton =

American diplomat

Alfred L. Atherton Jr.
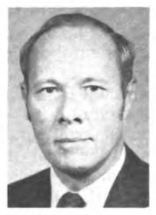

United States Ambassador to Egypt
- In office July 2, 1979 – November 12, 1983
- President: Jimmy Carter; Ronald Reagan
- Preceded by: Hermann F. Eilts
- Succeeded by: Nicholas A. Veliotes

11th Assistant Secretary of State for Near Eastern and South Asian Affairs
- In office April 27, 1974 – April 13, 1978
- Preceded by: Joseph J. Sisco
- Succeeded by: Harold H. Saunders

17th Director General of the Foreign Service
- In office December 2, 1983 – December 28, 1984
- Preceded by: Joan Margaret Clark
- Succeeded by: George Southall Vest

Personal details
- Born: November 22, 1921 Pittsburgh, Pennsylvania, U.S.
- Died: October 30, 2002 (aged 80) Washington, D. C., U.S.
- Resting place: Rock Creek Cemetery
- Education: Harvard University

Alfred Leroy "Roy" Atherton Jr. (November 22, 1921 – October 30, 2002) was a United States Foreign Service Officer and diplomat. He served as United States Ambassador to Egypt in 1979–1983. He was a Middle East expert who helped in the negotiations that led to the 1978 Camp David peace accords between Israel and Egypt.

== Early life ==
Atherton was born on November 22, 1921, in Pittsburgh, Pennsylvania, the son of Alfred Leroy Atherton Sr. and Joanna Reed.

He graduated from Phillips Exeter Academy. He served in the U.S. Army in Europe from 1943 to 1945. He received a B.S. in 1944 and an M.A. in 1947 from Harvard University. He received a master's degree in economics from the University of California, Berkeley.

== Diplomatic career ==
=== Foreign service (1947-1961) ===
Atherton joined the U.S. Foreign Service in 1947, and served in Stuttgart, Bonn, Damascus, and Aleppo. From 1959 to 1961, he was Iraq-Jordan desk officer, then Officer in Charge for Cyprus, in the Bureau of Near Eastern and South Asian Affairs at the State Department. During 1961-62 he took advanced economic studies at the University of California, Berkeley.

=== India (1962-1965) ===
From 1962 to 1965, he was economic officer in Calcutta, India.

=== Middle East Affairs (1965-1978) ===
Between 1965 and 1966, he was deputy director of the Office of Near Eastern Affairs at the State Department. In 1966 and 1967, he was Country Director for Iraq, Jordan, Lebanon, and Syria. From 1967 to 1970, he was Country Director for Israel and Arab-Israel Affairs. From 1970 to 1974, he was Deputy Assistant Secretary of State for the Bureau of Near Eastern and South Asian Affairs. From 1974 to 1978, he was Assistant Secretary for Near Eastern and South Asian Affairs.

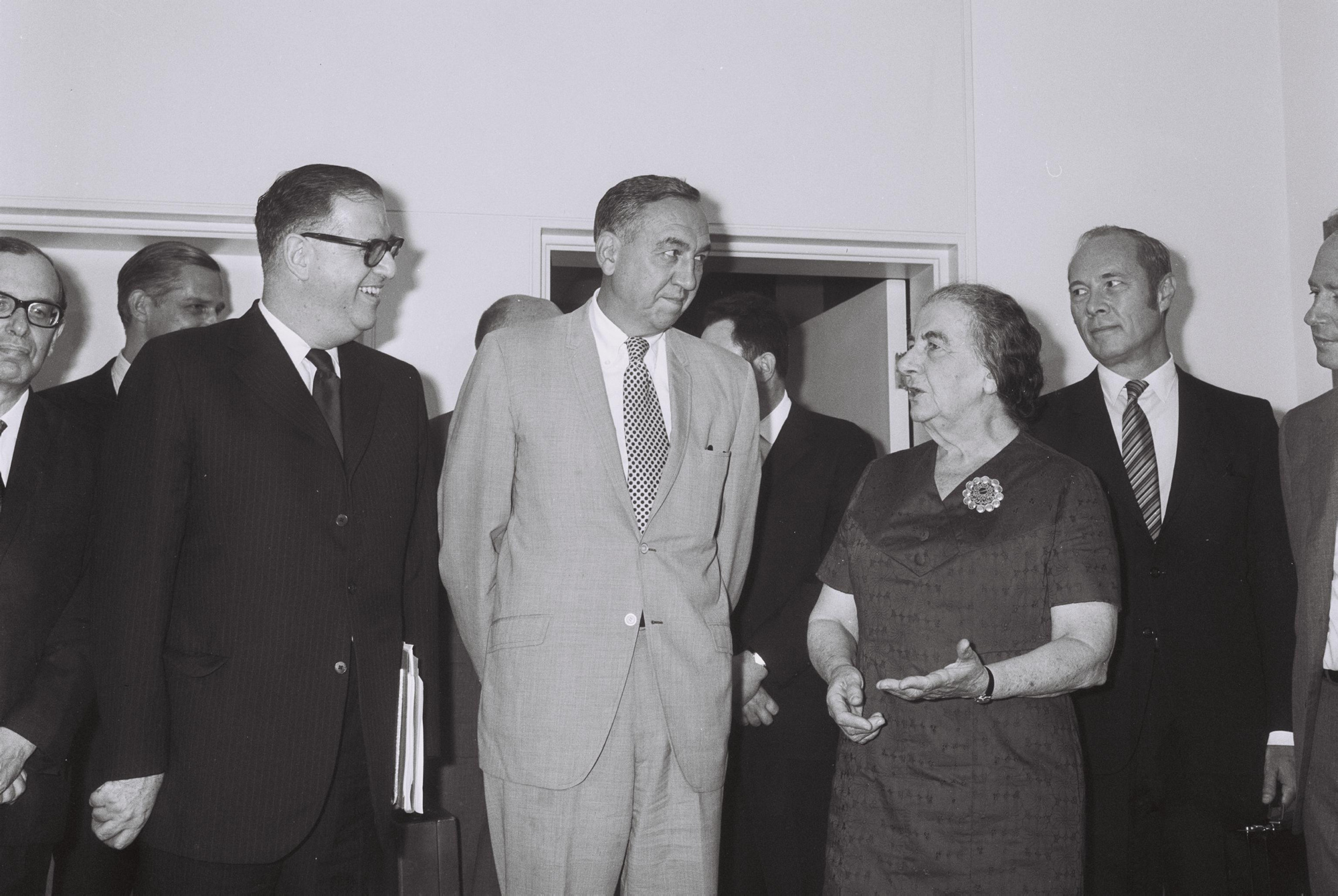
Alfred Atherton (right), with Golda Meir, Abba Eban and Joseph Sisco

=== Ambassador at large: Camp David Summit ===
He became an Ambassador-at-large and was a member of the U.S. negotiating team at the Camp David summit in September 1978.

The summit produced the Camp David Accords. Atherton had spent months preparing both parties for the summit.

=== Egypt (1979-1983) ===
He served as United States Ambassador to Egypt from 1979 to 1983, where he was responsible for the largest U.S. mission in the world, with a staff of 872 Americans and 500 Egyptians. After the Camp David Accord many staff were dispatched to help administer the $1.5 billion a year in military assistance. During his tenure the Egyptian President Anwar Sadat was assassinated. After completing his final overseas tour he returned to Washington D.C.

=== Director General of the Foreign Service (1983-1985) ===
This was his final post prior to retiring from government service in 1985. The previous year he took on an added task heading up a fellowship program for promising future leaders from the United Kingdom, Australia and New Zealand to study in the United States by the name of the Harkness Fellowships, a program run by the Commonwealth Fund, a New York-based philanthropic foundation established by Anna M. Harkness.

== Service chronology ==
Position	Host country or organization	Year
US State Department Vice Consul	Stuttgart, Germany	1947–1949
US State Department Political Reports Office	Bonn, Germany	1949–1952
US State Department Second Secretary-Vice Consul	Damascus, Syria	1952–1956
US State Department Consul	Aleppo, Syria	1956–1959
US State Department Iraq-Jordan Desk, International Relations Office	Washington D.C.	1959–1961
US State Department Economic Officer	Calcutta, India	1962–1965
US State Department Deputy Director of the Office of Near Eastern Affairs	Washington D.C.	1965–1966
US State Department Country director for Iraq, Jordan, Lebanon, and Syria	Washington D.C.	1966–1967
US State Department Country director for Israel and Arab-Israel Affairs	Washington D.C.	1967–1970
US State Department Deputy Asst. Secy. for Near Eastern & South Asian Affairs	Washington D.C.	1970–1974
US Assistant Secretary of State for Near East Affairs	Washington D.C.	1974–1978
US Ambassador at Large	Washington D.C.	1978–1979
US Ambassador to Egypt	Cairo, Egypt	1979–1983
US State Department Director General of the Foreign Service	Washington D.C.	1983-1985

== Memberships, awards and affiliations ==
- Director of the Harkness Fellowship Program of the Commonwealth Fund of New York
- Director of the Una Chapman Cox Foundation

== Academic career ==
He was a visiting professor of Middle Eastern Affairs at Hamilton College as Sol M. Linowitz Visiting professor of government (1991–1992). There, he taught a small seminar on the history and dynamics of the Arab-Israeli conflict. He also was a visiting professor at Mount Holyoke and Birmingham Southern Colleges.

== Personal ==
He married Betty Wylie (1921–2001) from Chicago, Illinois. They had three children; Lynne, Reed and Michael.

He was a member of All Souls Unitarian Church in Washington D.C.

He died at Sibley Memorial Hospital in Washington, on October 30, 2002 from complications related to cancer surgery. He is buried at Rock Creek Cemetery, Washington D.C. along with his wife, Betty Wylie who died on February 18, 2009.

== Ancestry ==
His paternal ancestors had resided in Lancaster, Massachusetts having been pioneer settlers to the area. He is a direct descendant of James Atherton, who arrived in Dorchester, Massachusetts, in the 1630s. The Atherton family ancestry originated from Lancashire, England.

Government offices
Preceded by Joseph J. Sisco	Assistant Secretary of State for Near Eastern and South Asian Affairs; April 27, 1974 – April 13, 1978	Succeeded by Harold H. Saunders
Diplomatic posts
Preceded by Hermann F. Eilts	United States Ambassador to Egypt; July 2, 1979 – November 12, 1983	Succeeded by Nicholas A. Veliotes
