= Margaret Scobey =

American diplomat

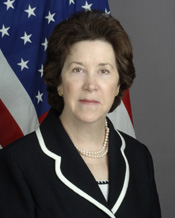
- Margaret Scobey

United States Ambassador to Egypt
- In office June 16, 2008 – June 30, 2011
- President: George W. Bush; Barack Obama
- Preceded by: Francis J. Ricciardone, Jr.
- Succeeded by: Anne W. Patterson

Political Counselor in Baghdad
- In office 2006–2007

United States Ambassador to Syria
- In office December 12, 2003 – 2005
- President: George W. Bush
- Preceded by: Theodore H. Kattouf
- Succeeded by: Stephen A. Seche

Personal details
- Born: 1949 (age 76–77) Memphis, Tennessee, U.S.
- Education: University of Tennessee; University of Michigan
- Profession: Diplomat

Margaret Scobey (born c. 1949) is an American diplomat and former United States Ambassador to Egypt and United States Ambassador to Syria.

== Biography ==
Scobey graduated from Immaculate Conception High School in Memphis, Tennessee in 1967. She earned a B.A. and an M.A. in history from the University of Tennessee in Knoxville. Scobey pursued doctoral studies in history at the University of Michigan in Ann Arbor.

As a United States Foreign Service Officer, Scobey served at the U.S. embassies in many Middle and Near Eastern countries. She was the Deputy Chief of Mission in Riyadh, Saudi Arabia, from September 2001 to November 2003, before receiving her first appointment as ambassador, to Syria. She was recalled from Syria in 2005 after the assassination of the Lebanese Prime Minister Rafiq Hariri. Scobey served as Political Counselor in Baghdad from 2006 to 2007.

In February 2008, she was nominated and confirmed as the U.S. Ambassador to Egypt.

In February 2011, she spoke with Mohamed ElBaradei, telling him:

The U.S. is interested in a political change in Egypt, but that the US government won't dictate the path which Cairo must follow."

Diplomatic posts
Preceded by Theodore H. Kattouf	United States Ambassador to Syria; 2004–2005	Succeeded by Stephen A. Seche
Preceded by Francis J. Ricciardone, Jr.	United States Ambassador to Egypt; 2008–2011	Succeeded by Anne W. Patterson
