= Joel Ehrendreich =

American diplomat

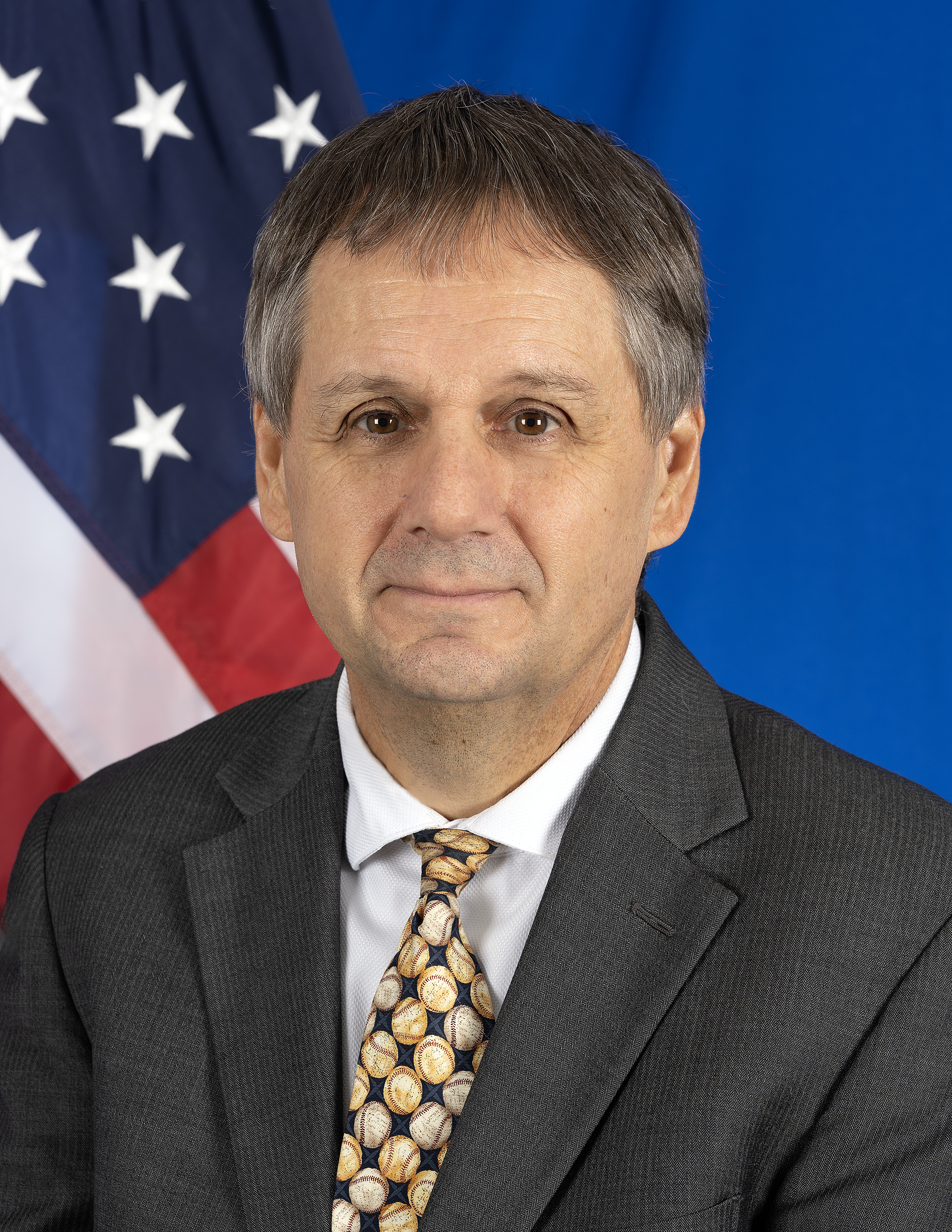

United States Ambassador to Palau
- In office September 29, 2023 – May 4, 2026
- President: Joe Biden; Donald Trump
- Preceded by: John Hennessey-Niland

Personal details
- Education: Drake University (BBA)

Joel Ehrendreich is an American diplomat who had served as the United States ambassador to Palau. He previously served as the director of the Office of Japanese Affairs at the State Department from 2022 to 2023.

== Early life and education ==
Ehrendreich is a native of Nebraska. He also grew up in Whitefish Bay, Wisconsin and attended Whitefish Bay High School. He earned a Bachelor of Business Administration from Drake University.

== Career ==
Early in his career, Ehrendreich served in the Peace Corps in Niger from 1985 to 1987. He is a career member of the Senior Foreign Service with the rank of Counselor. He served as director of Regional and Security Policy in the Bureau of East Asian and Pacific Affairs. Prior to that, he was senior operations officer in the Bureau of Legislative Affairs, a foreign policy advisor to the Commandant of the Marine Corps, a consul general at the U.S. Consulate General in Okinawa, Japan, an economic counselor at U.S. embassy in Manila, the Philippines, and an economic and political counselor at U.S. embassy in Singapore. Earlier assignments include service at U.S. embassies in New Delhi, Tokyo, Sydney, and the West African nation of Togo. Ehrendreich also served in the White House Situation Room as a senior duty officer. Since 2022, he has served as the director of the Office of Japanese Affairs at the State Department.

=== U.S. ambassador to Palau ===
On March 20, 2023, President Joe Biden announced his intent to nominate Ehrendreich to be the next United States ambassador to Palau. On March 21, 2023, his nomination was sent to the Senate. Hearings on his nomination were held before the Senate Foreign Relations Committee on June 13, 2023. The committee favorably reported his nomination on July 13, 2023, and it was confirmed by the full United States Senate on July 27, 2023 via voice vote. Ehrendreich presented his credentials to President Surangel Whipps Jr. on September 29, 2023.

== Personal life ==
Ehrendreich speaks French and Japanese.

Diplomatic posts
Preceded by John Hennessey-Niland	United States Ambassador to Palau; 2023–2026	Succeeded by Vacant
