= List of ambassadors of the United States to Egypt =

Ambassador of the United States to Egypt
- سفير الولايات المتحدة الأمريكية فى مصر
- Seal of the United States Department of State

- Flag of a United States ambassador

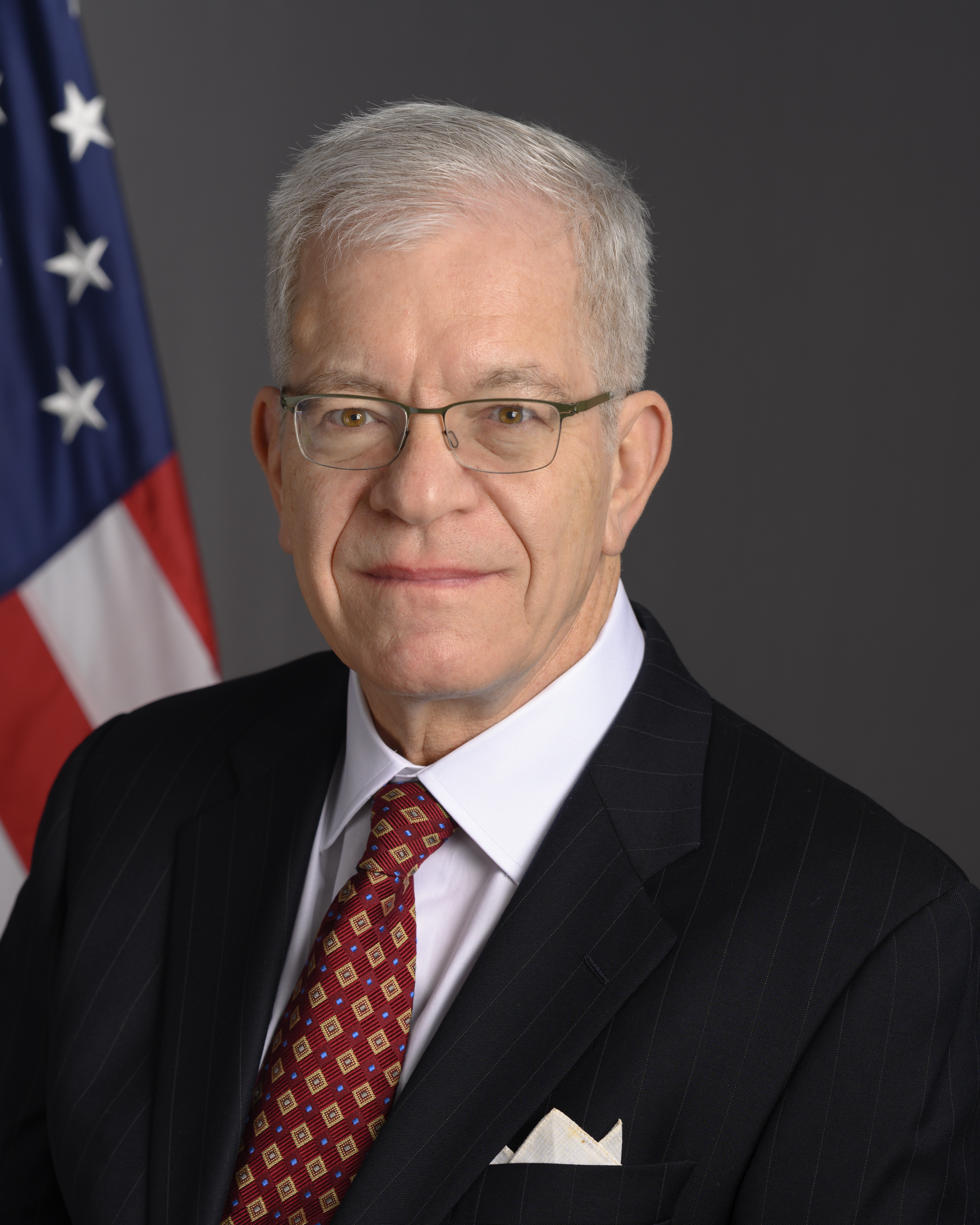
- Incumbent; Robert Silverman; Chargé d'affaires since March 9, 2026
- Nominator: The president of the United States
- Appointer: The president with Senate advice and consent
- Inaugural holder: Daniel Smith McCauley as Agent/Consul General
- Formation: August 14, 1848
- Website: U.S. Embassy - Cairo

This is a list of ambassadors (or other diplomatic representatives) of the United States to Egypt.

The United States first established diplomatic relations with Egypt in 1848, when President James K. Polk appointed Daniel Smith McCauley as the first envoy to Egypt with the title Consul General. McCauley and his family were transported to Egypt aboard the USS Constitution in 1849.

Relations between Egypt and the United States have been continuous since 1848, except for the period between 1967 and 1974. The then United Arab Republic severed relations with the U.S. following the Six-Day War; Egypt restored relations following the Yom Kippur War.

The United States Embassy in Egypt is located in Cairo.

== Ambassadors ==
Name	Appointed	Presented credentials	Terminated mission	Notes
Daniel Smith McCauley	August 14, 1848	March 17, 1849	Died at post October 24, 1852	Envoys held the title of Agent/Consul General until 1922
Richard B. Jones	December 28, 1852	May 7, 1853	December 14, 1853	
Edwin De Leon	May 24, 1853	December 14, 1853	March 4, 1861	
William Sydney Thayer	March 20, 1861	Unknown. Assumed charge July 1, 1861	Died at post April 10, 1864	
Charles Hale	May 18, 1864	About October 15, 1864	Presented recall, May 23, 1870	
George Harris Butler	March 15, 1870	June 2, 1870	July 16, 1872	
Richard Beardsley	July 23, 1872	September 24, 1872	Died at post January 23, 1876	
Elbert E. Farman	March 27, 1876	July 17, 1876	May 17, 1881	
Simon Wolf	June 30, 1881	October 22, 1881	March 27, 1882	
George P. Pomeroy	December 16, 1881	July 1, 1882	July 20, 1884	
John Cardwell	October 2, 1885	April 19, 1886	October 7, 1889	
Eugene Schuyler	June 26, 1889	November 23, 1889	July 2, 1890	
John A. Anderson	February 27, 1891	July 13, 1891	April 21, 1892	
Edward C. Little	November 15, 1892	April 22, 1893	August 22, 1893	
Frederic Courtland Penfield	May 13, 1893	December 11, 1893	June 17, 1897	
Thomas Harrison	April 22, 1897	December 23, 1897	March 22, 1899	
John G. Long	October 30, 1899	April 2, 1900	July 15, 1903	
John W. Riddle	September 8, 1903	March 28, 1904	June 9, 1905	
Lewis M. Iddings	March 23, 1905	December 23, 1905	April 14, 1910	
Peter Augus Jay	December 21, 1909	November 28, 1910	October 8, 1913	
Olney Arnold	September 2, 1913	March 23, 1914	January 8, 1916	
Hampson Gary	October 2, 1917	February 7, 1918	December 7, 1919	
Carroll Sprigg	May 11, 1920	August 2, 1920	October 31, 1921	
J. Morton Howell	October 7, 1921	Unknown	July 6, 1927	The title of the envoy was changed to Envoy Extraordinary and Minister Plenipotentiary on June 21, 1922.
Franklin Mott Gunther	April 5, 1928	July 19, 1928	July 30, 1930	
William M. Jardine	July 21, 1930	October 13, 1930	September 5, 1933	
Bert Fish	September 6, 1933	December 2, 1933	February 28, 1941	
Alexander C. Kirk	February 11, 1941	March 29, 1941	April 29, 1944	
S. Pinkney Tuck	May 4, 1944	June 14, 1944	May 30, 1948	The title of the envoy was changed to Ambassador Extraordinary and Plenipotentiary on September 19. 1946
Stanton Griffis	July 7, 1948	September 2, 1948	March 18, 1949	
Jefferson Caffery	July 9, 1949	September 29, 1949	January 11, 1955	
Henry A. Byroade	January 24, 1955	March 7, 1955	September 10, 1956	
Raymond A. Hare	August 14, 1956	September 25, 1956	March 10, 1958	Recommissioned and reaccredited to the United Arab Republic. Egypt and Syria incorporated themselves into United Arab Republic on February 22, 1958. Subsequent ambassadors were commissioned to the UAR until 1967. Syria seceded from the UAR in September 1961 but Egypt continued to use the UAR name until 1971.
Raymond A. Hare	March 10, 1958	March 19, 1958	December 18, 1959	
G. Frederick Reinhardt	January 27, 1960	March 22, 1960	May 6, 1961	
John S. Badeau	May 29, 1961	July 19, 1961	June 9, 1964	
Lucius D. Battle	July 31, 1964	September 22, 1964	March 5, 1967	
Richard H. Nolte	April 5, 1967	Did not present credentials	June 10, 1967	The United Arab Republic (Egypt) severed diplomatic relations with the United States on June 6, 1967, during the Six-Day War with Israel.
Hermann F. Eilts	March 19, 1974	April 20, 1974	May 20, 1979	Diplomatic relations between the United States and Egypt were resumed in 1974. The U.S. embassy was reestablished on February 28, 1974.
Alfred L. Atherton, Jr.	May 17, 1979	July 2, 1979	November 12, 1983	
Nicholas A. Veliotes	October 7, 1983	November 24, 1983	April 1, 1986	
Frank G. Wisner	August 18, 1986	August 28, 1986	June 6, 1991	
Robert H. Pelletreau	July 2, 1992	September 12, 1991	December 11, 1993	
Edward S. Walker, Jr.	May 9, 1994	July 20, 1994	December 7, 1997	
Daniel Charles Kurtzer	November 10, 1997	January 13, 1998	June 22, 2001	
C. David Welch	July 12, 2001	September 22, 2001	March 15, 2005	
Francis J. Ricciardone, Jr.	August 2, 2005	November 13, 2005	April 18, 2008	
Margaret Scobey	March 14, 2008	June 16, 2008	June 30, 2011	
Anne W. Patterson	June 30, 2011	August 18, 2011	August 31, 2013	
R. Stephen Beecroft	June 26, 2014	February 14, 2015	June 30, 2017	
Thomas H. Goldberger	June 30, 2017		October 16, 2019	Chargé d'Affaires ad interim
Jonathan Cohen	August 1, 2019	November 17, 2019	March 31, 2022	
Nicole Shampaine	March 31, 2022		August 23, 2022	Chargé d'Affaires ad interim
Daniel Rubinstein	August 23, 2022		April 26, 2023	Chargé d'Affaires ad interim
John Desrocher	April 26, 2023		August 12, 2023	Chargé d'Affaires ad interim
Evyenia Sidereas	August 12, 2023		October 9, 2023	Chargé d'Affaires ad interim
A. Elizabeth Jones	October 9, 2023		November 15, 2023	Chargé d'Affaires ad interim
Herro Mustafa	November 1, 2023	November 15, 2023	January 17, 2026	
Evyenia Sidereas	January 17, 2026		March 9, 2026	Chargé d'Affaires ad interim
Robert Silverman	March 9, 2026		Present	Chargé d'Affaires ad interim

== See also ==
- Egypt – United States relations
- Foreign relations of Egypt
- Ambassadors of the United States
