= Joseph C. Green =

American diplomat and academic (1887–1978)

Joseph Coy Green (1887 – August 2, 1978) was an American diplomat who was the American Ambassador to Jordan (Envoy, May 14, 1952 – July 31, 1952; Ambassador 1952–1953). Before becoming Ambassador, he was executive director of the board of examiners of the Foreign Service and chairman of the commission for revision of examinations for the Foreign Service.

== Life and career ==
Green served other positions within the State Department including special representative to the International Institute of Agriculture in Rome (1931), chairman of the Armaments Commission (1944-1946), and a member of the U.S. Mission to observe the elections in Greece (1946).

When Green retired from the State Department in 1953, he “testified before two Senate committees criticizing American foreign policy in the Middle East. He charged that the State Department lacked a solution to the key problem of Arab refugees from Israel.”

In a 1971 letter to The Washington Post, Green “ expressed the opinion that the essential problem in the Middle East was ‘the obtaining of justice, or some semblance of justice for the several million Christians and Muslims held in subjection by the Israelis or driven into exile from their native land.’”

He was an assistant and associate professor of history and politics at Princeton University (from which he graduated in 1908) where his students included Charles W. Yost, who was also Green's deputy at the State Department's Office of Arms and Munitions Control, and George F. Kennan.

Green died in Parry Sound, Ontario on August 2, 1978.
