= Helen Reed-Rowe =

American diplomat

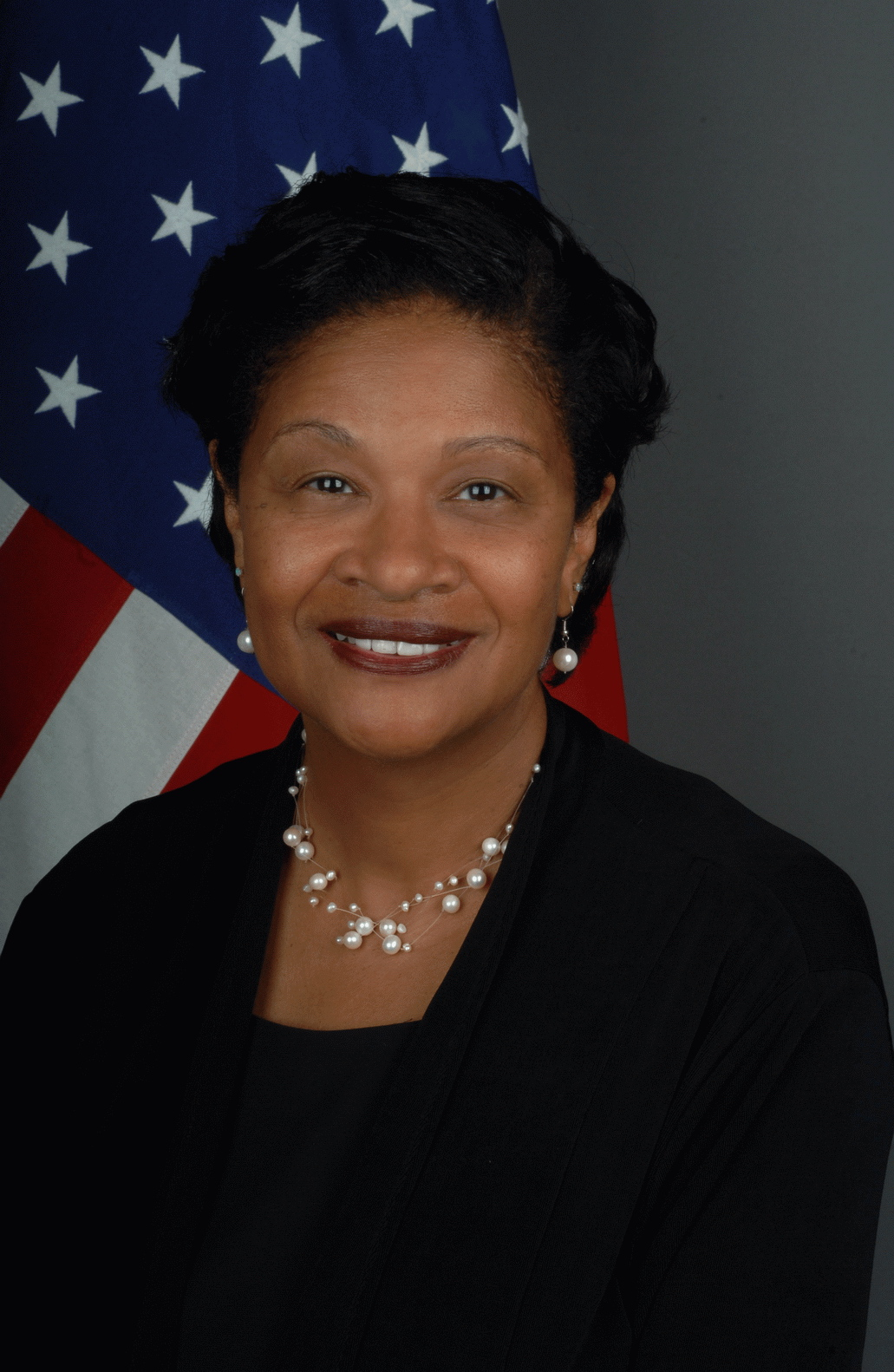

United States Ambassador to Palau
- In office September 30, 2010 – July 26, 2013
- President: Barack Obama
- Preceded by: Position established
- Succeeded by: Amy J. Hyatt

Personal details
- Born: 1949 (age 76–77) Baltimore, Maryland
- Education: University of Maryland, Eastern Shore BA; Naval War College MA

Helen Reed-Rowe (born 1949), a career diplomat of the Senior Foreign Service, served as the first resident United States Ambassador to Palau.

Reed-Rowe was born Helen Patricia Reed in Baltimore, Maryland. She graduated from Edmondson High School with honors and earned a BA from University of Maryland, Eastern Shore. Reed-Rowe joined the US Foreign Service in 1986 serving overseas and at the Department of State in DC. In 2008, Reed-Rowe earned a master's degree from the Naval War College. On August 9, 2010 President Obama named her to be the first resident US Ambassador to the Republic of Palau. She was sworn in on September 27, 2010. Her final State Department assignment was Ambassador to the United States Army War College.

== Early life and education ==
Reed-Rowe was born Helen Patricia Reed to Gladys and John W. Reed, Sr. in Baltimore, Maryland in 1949. She credits her family with sparking her interest in world affairs. "My parents were very involved in the community and wanted us to be concerned not just with the local area, but the rest of the world. I think that had a strong influence on me." A native of the Cherry Hill neighborhood of Baltimore City, Reed-Rowe attended public schools and graduated from Edmondson High School with honors.

A first generation college graduate, she earned a Bachelor of Arts degree from University of Maryland, Eastern Shore (formerly Maryland State College a Historically Black College) in Princess Anne, MD. During her college years, she was inducted into the National Honor Society and listed in Who's Who in American Colleges and University.

== Career ==
Reed-Rowe joined the Foreign Service in 1986 and served overseas in three geographic regions. She served in managerial capacities in Niger, Ecuador and Jamaica, and as Deputy Chief of Mission in the Republic of the Marshall Islands. In Washington, she managed diverse portfolios in the Bureaus of Near Eastern Affairs and European Affairs as well as the Bureau of African Affairs.

She also served as an Examiner on the Board of Examiners in the Bureau of Human Resources and as an area manager in Overseas Building Operations. In addition, Reed-Rowe served as a Senior Advisor to the Office of Performance Evaluation in the Department of State and as a Foreign Affairs Advisor from the Department of State to the Avian Influenza Action Group. As a Pearson Fellow, Reed-Rowe served a one-year assignment in the congressional office of Representative Sheila Jackson-Lee (TX). In 2008, Reed-Rowe earned a master's degree in National Security and Strategic Studies from the Naval War College in Newport, Rhode Island.

Reed-Rowe was nominated by President Obama on August 9, 2010 to be the first U. S. Ambassador to the Republic of Palau. Before that appointment, the US ambassador to the Philippines would also handle diplomatic relations with Palau from the Philippines. After confirmation by the Senate. She was sworn in on September 27, 2010. The new ambassador established the new US embassy in Koror, Palau.

Reed-Rowe completed that assignment July 26, 2013, and was succeeded by Amy J. Hyatt. Reed-Rowe then joined the United States Army War College as a member of the Command team which focuses on the development of the next generation of military, interagency and international leaders. She officially retired from the Foreign Service in July 2014.

During her career, Reed-Rowe earned several Department of State Meritorious Honor Awards, recognition from the Republic of the Marshall Islands, and the Republic of Palau, and the U.S. Army Superior Civilian Service Award.

== Personal ==
In addition to English, Reed-Rowe speaks Spanish and French. She has two adult children, Nikkia Rowe and Kevin Anthony Rowe.

== See also ==
- List of ambassadors of the United States
