= Hermann Eilts =

American diplomat (1922-2006)

Hermann Frederick Eilts (March 23, 1922 – October 12, 2006) was a United States Foreign Service Officer and diplomat. He served as an American ambassador to Saudi Arabia and Egypt, assisted Henry Kissinger's Mideast shuttle diplomacy effort, worked with Egyptian President Anwar el-Sadat throughout the Camp David Accords, and dodged a Libyan hit team.

== Early life ==
Eilts was born in Weißenfels, Germany, immigrated with his Parents, Friedrion Eilts and Meta Eilts, to the United States as a child, and became a citizen at age 8 in 1930. He grew up in Scranton, Pennsylvania and graduated from Ursinus College in 1943. He served in the Military Intelligence Corps during World War II.

== Diplomatic career ==
After graduating with a master's degree from Johns Hopkins' School of Advanced International Studies in 1947, Eilts joined the foreign service. He would go on to be a diplomat for 32 years. He first served in Saudi Arabia when the kingdom had just learned to pump oil for the international market and later was U.S. ambassador there during the 1967 Arab-Israeli Six-Day War. Eilts was one of only a few of the State Department's Arabist diplomats who did not advocate a blindly pro-Arab policy in the runup to that conflict, as he wrote cables saying that the views of other diplomats regarding hostile responses to a planned (later aborted) Western flotilla to re-open the Straits of Tiran to Israeli vessels were overstated because the Arab states lacked the materiel to counter such a move, and that forcing the Egyptians to back down here would reduce the risk of open warfare. He was appointed U.S. Ambassador to Egypt on February 28, 1974. He aided former Secretary of State Henry Kissinger during the 1974-75 period of shuttle diplomacy and became close to Egyptian President Anwar Sadat during the tense negotiations with Israel in 1977 and 1978. As Ambassador to Egypt, he was "considered by his American colleagues, Egyptian peers and Sadat as an extraordinarily talented diplomat."

That alliance, as well as his standing as a leading American in the region, apparently prompted Libyan leader Muammar Gaddafi to send hit squads to Cairo in search of Mr. Eilts. U.S. intelligence agencies discovered the plot, and President Jimmy Carter immediately warned Gaddafi that he would be held responsible if Mr. Eilts was harmed.

== Academic career ==
After retiring from the foreign service, he joined the faculty of Boston University. In 1982, he established the Center of International Relations (CIR) at Boston University, which became the Department of International Relations in 1988, with Amb. Eilts as its founding chair. Later, this was to become the core of Boston University's new school of international affairs, the Frederick S. Pardee School of Global Studies, in 2014. In 1993 he became professor emeritus at Boston University. Eilts died at age 84 from complications of heart disease at his Wellesley, Massachusetts home on October 12, 2006.

== Service chronology ==
Position	Host country or organization	Year
U.S. Foreign Service	Riyadh, Saudi Arabia	1947–1949
U.S. Foreign Service		1949–1964
U.S. Foreign Service	Tripoli, Libya	1964–1965
U.S. Ambassador	Riyadh, Saudi Arabia	1965–1970
U.S. Ambassador	Dhaka, Bangladesh	1972–1973
U.S. Ambassador	Cairo, Egypt	1974–1979

== Memberships, awards and affiliations ==
- Board of Trustees, American University in Cairo
- American Academy of Diplomacy (charter member)
- Purple Heart and Bronze Star recipient
- Boston University Center for International Relations (founder and director)

Diplomatic posts
Preceded by Parker T. Hart	United States Ambassador to Saudi Arabia; 1965–1970	Succeeded by Nicholas G. Thacher
Preceded by office reestablished	United States Ambassador to Egypt; 1974–1979	Succeeded by Alfred Atherton
