= Paul H. Boeker =

American diplomat (1938–2003)

United States Ambassador to Jordan
- In office 1984–1987

Director of the Foreign Service Institute
- In office 1980–1983

Personal details
- Born: May 2, 1938 St. Louis, Missouri
- Died: March 29, 2003 (aged 64)
- Education: University of Michigan

Paul H. Boeker (May 2, 1938 – March 29, 2003) was an American diplomat who served as the U.S. ambassador to Jordan (1984–1987) and Bolivia (1977–1980).

== Early life and education ==
Boeker was born in St. Louis, Missouri on May 2, 1938. He graduated Magna Cum Laude from Dartmouth College and received a master's degree in economics from the University of Michigan.

== Career ==
Boeker was director of the Foreign Service Institute from 1980 to 1983. While in Jordan, he arranged secret meetings between Jordanian and Israeli officials on issues such as telecommunications, counterterrorism and water sharing. Because he protected American lives during a Bolivian military coup d'état in 1979, he received the State Department's Superior Honor Award. Boeker was president and chief executive of the Institute of the Americas at the University of California, San Diego, a networking organization between Western Hemisphere countries in multiple economic sectors. for the last 14 years of his career.

== Personal life and death ==
Boeker died from brain cancer at his home in San Diego, California, on March 29, 2003, at the age of 64.
