= Thomas H. Goldberger =

American diplomat

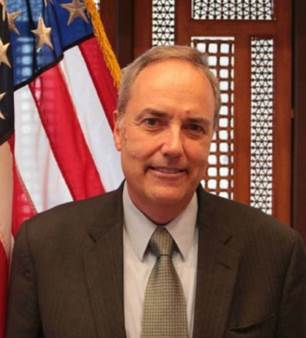
Thomas H. Goldberger

Thomas Henry Goldberger served as Chargé d'Affaires at the U.S. Embassy in Cairo, Egypt in 2014 and from 2017–2019.

With a focus on the Middle East, Goldberger has served as Assistant Chief of Mission at the U.S. Embassy in Baghdad, Deputy Chief of Mission in Tel Aviv and director of the Office of Israel and Palestinian Affairs at the U.S. Department of State "where he was responsible for coordinating U.S. support for peace negotiations between Israel and its neighbors."

In early 2019, Goldberger closed the US Embassy booth at the Cairo International Book Fair ("considered the most important event in the Arabic publishing world") when the Simon Wiesenthal Center reported about antisemitic materials.

== Early life ==
Goldberger is a native of New Jersey and graduated from Rutgers University and Georgetown University.
