= J. Morton Howell =

American diplomat (1863–1937)

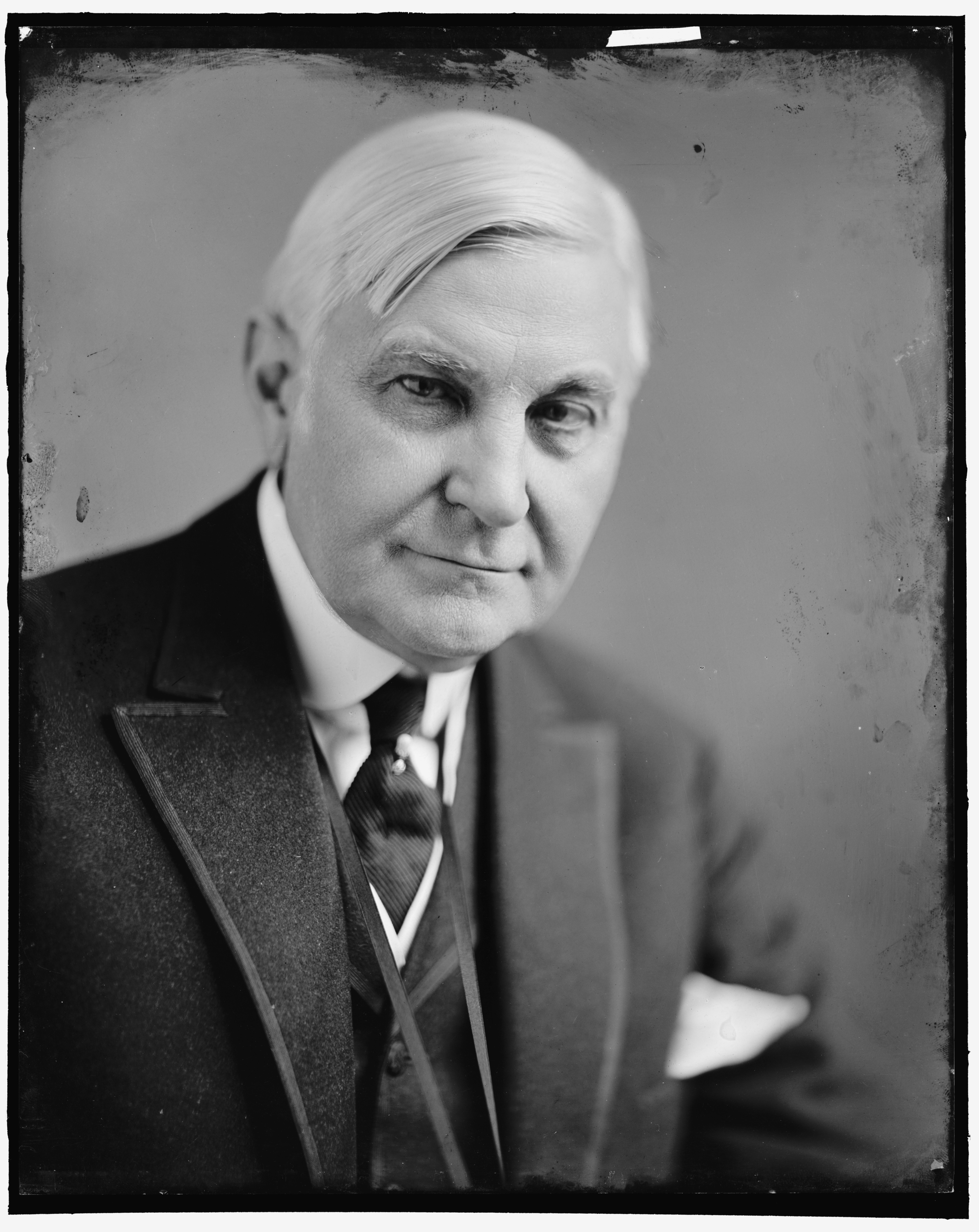
Howell in 1905

Joseph Morton Howell (March 17, 1863 Uniopolis, Ohio–1937) was a political appointee who served first as Agent/Consul General (appointed October 7, 1921) before being appointed Envoy Extraordinary and Minister Plenipotentiary to Egypt. While in Egypt, Howell "was one of four representatives of foreign nations present at the formal opening of the tomb of Tut-Ankh-Amen." Howell graduated from Starling Medical College (now known as Ohio State University College of Medicine) in 1885.
