= Kimelman =

Kimelman is a surname. Notable people with the surname include:

- Donald Kimelman, American journalist
- Edwin Kimelman (died 2007), Canadian judge
- Henry L. Kimelman (1921–2009), American businessman, political adviser and diplomat
- Michael A. Kimelman, American businessman
- Paul Kimelman (born 1947), American motivational speaker
