= Edward J. Sparks =

American diplomat (1897–1976)

Edward Sparks

United States Ambassador to Uruguay
- In office May 24, 1961 – May 15, 1962
- President: Dwight D. Eisenhower
- Preceded by: Robert F. Woodward
- Succeeded by: Wymberley DeRenne Coerr

United States Ambassador to Venezuela
- In office March 19, 1958 – April 15, 1961
- President: Dwight D. Eisenhower
- Preceded by: Dempster McIntosh
- Succeeded by: Teodoro Moscoso

United States Ambassador to Guatemala
- In office July 29, 1955 – February 15, 1958
- President: Dwight D. Eisenhower
- Preceded by: Norman Armour
- Succeeded by: Lester D. Mallory

38th United States Ambassador to Bolivia
- In office June 13, 1952 – October 29, 1954
- President: Harry S. Truman
- Preceded by: Irving Florman
- Succeeded by: Gerald A. Drew

Personal details
- Born: Edward John Sparks; 1897 Jersey City, New Jersey, U.S.
- Died: 1976 (aged 73) Santiago, Chile

Edward John Sparks (1897 – 1976) was an American diplomat who served as the United States ambassador to Bolivia, Guatemala, Venezuela, and Uruguay.

== Background ==
Sparks was born in Jersey City, New Jersey. He began his career as a clerk in the United States Department of War and was later sent to Santiago to serve as a military attaché. He later joined the United States Foreign Service. Sparks spent his career in various diplomatic positions in Latin America. He was also assigned to a post in Copenhagen for three years. Sparks retired in 1962 and moved to Santiago, Chile.
