= Ebenezer Bassett =

American diplomat

United States Minister Resident to Haiti
- In office 1869–1877
- President: Ulysses S Grant
- Preceded by: Gideon Hiram Hollister
- Succeeded by: John Mercer Langston

Personal details
- Born: October 16, 1833 Derby, Connecticut, U.S.
- Died: November 13, 1908 (aged 75) Brooklyn, New York, U.S.
- Spouse: Eliza Park (m. 1855)
- Children: 8
- Education: Connecticut Normal School (now Central Connecticut State University)

Ebenezer Don Carlos Bassett (October 16, 1833 – November 13, 1908) was United States Ambassador to Haiti from 1869 to 1877. He was the first African American diplomat and the fourth U.S. ambassador to Haiti since the two countries established relations in 1862. His mother was Pequot. From 1857 to 1869, he was the principal of the Institute for Colored Youth in Philadelphia.

Ebenezer Bassett was appointed as new leaders emerged among free African Americans after the American Civil War. An educator, abolitionist, and civil rights activist, Bassett was the U.S. diplomatic envoy in 1869 to Haiti, the "Black Republic" of the Western Hemisphere. Through eight years of bloody civil war and coups d'état there, Bassett served in one of the most crucial, but difficult postings of his time. Haiti was of strategic importance in the Caribbean basin for its shipping lanes and as a naval coaling station.

== Early life ==
Born in Derby, Connecticut, Ebenezer D. Bassett was from a community that had a strong tradition of owning their own property, running their own businesses, and playing important leadership roles. Among this community, the Bassetts stood out as astute and prominent. Bassett's father Eben Tobias, as well as his grandfather Tobiah, had the distinction of being elected "Black Governor" in Connecticut, an unofficial honorific among the black community.

Both Bassett's parents ensured that their son would receive the best education possible. In a step rare for any students of the mid-19th century, Bassett attended college in his home state. In 1853 he was the first black student to attend the Connecticut Normal School (now Central Connecticut State University). He finished his schooling as quickly as the school allowed, one year. After graduation Bassett taught school in New Haven, where he met and became friends with the abolitionist Frederick Douglass.

== Educator and activist ==
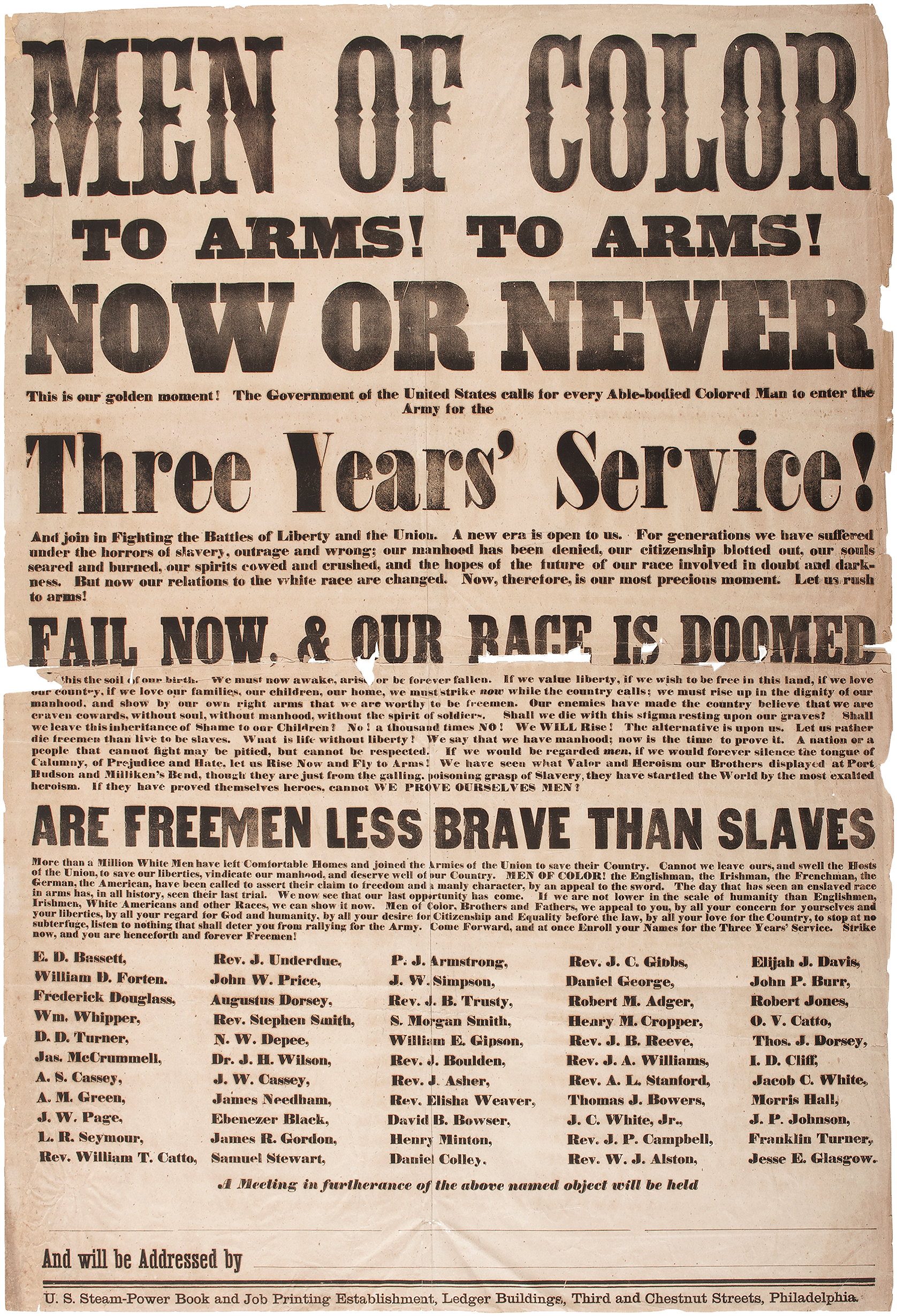
1863 Broadside listing Bassett as a speaker calling men of color to arms

Soon Bassett was offered the chance to teach at a progressive new all-Black high school in Philadelphia. At the time, he was teaching at the Institute for Colored Youth (ICY). It later became Cheyney University of Pennsylvania, the earliest college dedicated to educating Black youth in the country. There he focused on Latin, Greek, mathematics and science, becoming principal after one year. Among his students was John H. Smythe, who would also become a diplomat in Liberia. But Pennsylvania, like the rest of the country, was soon dragged into the American Civil War.

Ebenezer Bassett also became one of Philadelphia's leading voices for abolition of slavery and emancipation of the nearly four million enslaved Blacks. Bassett used ICY as a base to recruit Blacks to serve in the Union Army. He hastened to invite many of the national civil rights leaders who had become colleagues. Just days after the Battle of Gettysburg, Bassett and other Black leaders organized a recruiting drive for Black soldiers. Bassett had the honor of being the second speaker of the night, making his speech immediately preceding Frederick Douglass.

Men of Color, to Arms! Now or Never! This is our golden moment. The Government of the United States calls for every able-bodied colored man to enter the army for the three years' service, and join in fighting the battles of liberty and the Union. A new era is open to us. For generations we have suffered under the horrors of slavery, outrage, and wrong; our manhood has been denied, our citizenship blotted out, our souls seared and burned, our spirits cowed and crushed, and the hopes of the future of our race involved in doubts and darkness. But how the whole aspect of our relations to the white race is changed! Now, therefore, is our most precious moment. Let us rush to arms! Fail now, and our race is doomed on this soil of our birth.

Bassett was highly respected within the academic communities of the North. He attended educational meetings and advised abolitionists on matters of education. In New Haven Connecticut August 1865, a meeting was held by The American Institute to address the issue of freedman and education. Speeches were made by prominent members of the community. Benjamin B. Smith Bishop of Kentucky, John Celivergos Zachos educational theorist, Lyman Abbott Author, Thomas Anthony Thacher Yale College administrator, Rev. M.E. Strieby D.D. secretary American Missionary Association of New York. Ebenezer Basset attended the meeting and urged the need for more African American educators in the freed states, he felt freedman would have more confidence in their teachers.

His remaining years as an educator and activist would cement his position in the abolitionist community. The position of Haitian minister was first offered to John Mercer Langston, another prominent African American, by Andrew Johnson but Langston declined and Johnson chose Gideon H. Hollister instead. When Ulysses S Grant was elected to the presidency, he looked for Black leaders such as Bassett to fill important political positions. Douglass recommended Bassett to political allies in the White House.

== Diplomatic career ==
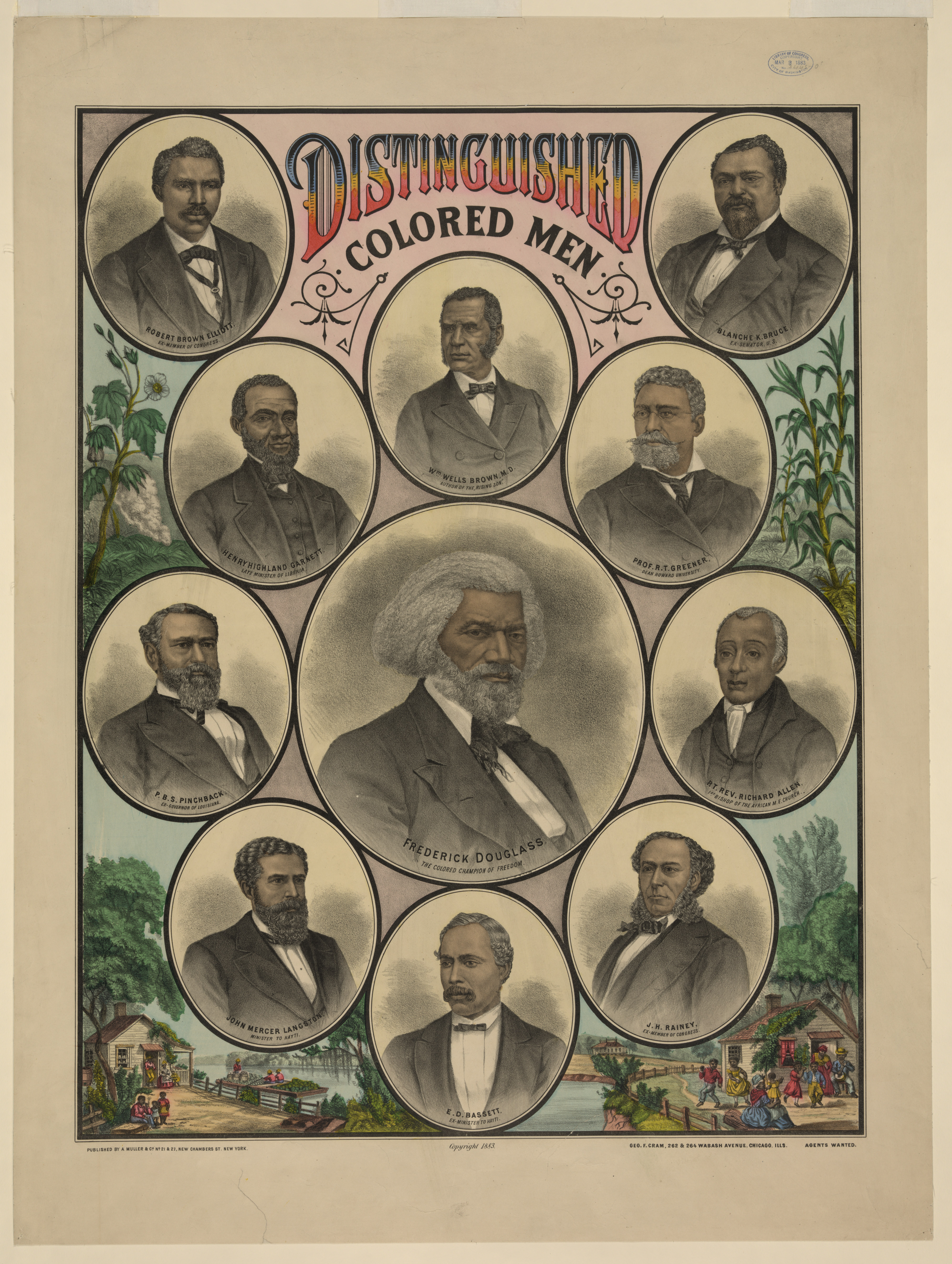
Lithograph of "distinguished colored men" c. 1883. Bassett is shown directly below Frederick Douglass.

In nominating Bassett to become Minister Resident to Haiti (the title Ambassador would not be used by the U.S. until 1893), Grant appointed him as one of the highest-ranking blacks in the U.S. government. Bassett's accreditation to the "Black Republic" was no accident either. Though Haiti had gained its independence from France in 1804, it was not officially recognized by the United States until 1862. Southern resistance to a former colony governed by ex-slaves becoming a "nation" had prevented the United States from recognizing the country. With the Union victory in the Civil War, the US government wanted to improve bilateral relations, and believed the appointment of Bassett was a significant step, not only for his skills (he was fluent in French in a time when diplomats were not required to learn the language of the state they served) but for the symbolism of his appointment.

Upon arrival in Port-au-Prince, however, Bassett found that Haiti was torn by civil war. Although with no international experience, as a representative of the US, the Minister Resident was one of the most powerful figures in the country. Bassett soon realized that much of diplomacy involved intangibles. Soon after his arrival, he wrote to Frederick Douglass that his duties were "not so onerous as delicate. Common sense and some little knowledge of law…will carry me through."

Bassett oversaw cases of citizen commercial claims, diplomatic immunity for consular and commercial agents, and aid to citizens affected by hurricanes, fires and numerous tropical diseases.

=== Canal crisis ===
The case that posed the greatest challenge to him, however, was political refugee General Pierre Théoma Boisrond-Canal. The general was among the band of young leaders who in 1869 successfully ousted the former President Sylvain Salnave from power. By the time of the subsequent regime of Michel Domingue in the mid-1870s, Canal had retired to his home outside the capital. The new Haitian President, however, suspicious of rivals, hunted down perceived threats, including Canal.

Canal and two young relatives arrived at Bassett's home, seeking protection and refuge. The diplomat agreed to protect them under his diplomatic immunity.

As a refugee, Canal had been essentially held captive by the government threat for more than five months. After Canal's departure, Bassett telegrammed the Department of State informing them that the crisis had finally passed: "Refugees amicably embarked and soldiers withdrawn from around my premises yesterday."

Although he faced professional repercussions for his disputes with State Department officials,he continued to urge the Secretary of State and the Domingue administration to ensure the humane treatment of a Haitian citizen. In doing so, Bassett served the interests of both the United States and the Haitian people.

Upon the end of the Grant Administration in 1877, Bassett submitted his resignation as was customary with a change of hands in government. In spite of any lingering resentment that may have existed in Washington because of his defiant stance, it was impossible for the Department not to recognize Bassett's work.

Acting Secretary of State F.W. Seward wrote to Bassett, thanking him for his years of service:

I cannot allow this opportunity to pass without expressing to you the appreciation of the Department for the very satisfactory manner in which you have discharged your duties of the mission at Port-au-Prince during your term of office. This commendation of your services is the more especially merited because at various times your duties have been of such a delicate nature as to have required the exercise of much tact and discretion.

== Later life ==
When he returned to the United States, he spent an additional ten years as the Consul General for Haiti in New York City. He later returned to Haiti as secretary to Frederick Douglass who had been appointed as Minister Resident. Bassett himself requested this position and historians have tied his willingness to accept this demotion to Bassett's financial troubles. Bassett worked to temper Douglass' zeal for Pan-Americanism and American expansionism during his tenure from 1889 to 1891.

Prior to his death in Brooklyn, New York, he lived in Philadelphia, where his daughter Charlotte taught at the Institute for Colored Youth. He is buried, with family members, at the Grove Street Cemetery in New Haven, Connecticut.

== See also ==
- African Americans in foreign policy
