= David Wolfson =

David Wolfson may refer to:

- David Wolfson, Baron Wolfson of Sunningdale (1935–2021), British politician and businessman
- David Wolfson, Baron Wolfson of Tredegar (born 1968), British lawyer and politician
- David Wolfson, author, book Life in the Fat Lane: The Paul Kimelman Story (1991)

== See also ==
- David Wolffsohn
