= Senator Hollister =

Senator Hollister may refer to:

- Gideon Hiram Hollister (1817–1881), Connecticut State Senate
- John J. Hollister Jr. (1901–1961), California State Senate
