= Pamela White =

American diplomat (born 1948)

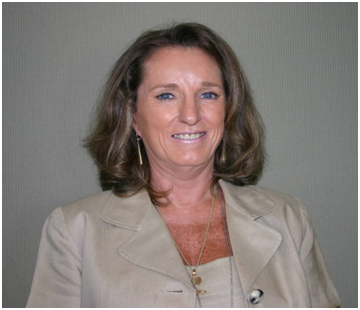

United States Ambassador to Haiti
- In office August 3, 2012 – October 6, 2015
- President: Barack Obama
- Preceded by: Kenneth Merten
- Succeeded by: Peter Mulrean

United States Ambassador to the Gambia
- In office November 29, 2010 – June 2, 2012
- President: Barack Obama
- Preceded by: Barry Wells
- Succeeded by: Edward Alford

Personal details
- Born: 1948 (age 77–78) Lewiston, Maine, U.S.
- Education: University of Maine (BA); School for International Training (MA)

Pamela A. White (born 1948) is an American diplomat. In November 2010, White was named United States ambassador to The Gambia by President Barack Obama. In January 2012, White was appointed United States ambassador to Haiti.

== Early life and education ==
Born in Lewiston, Maine, White was raised in nearby Auburn. In 1967, White graduated from Edward Little High School. She then earned a Bachelor of Arts degree in journalism from the University of Maine in 1971. She earned a master's degree from the School for International Training in Vermont and then a degree in international development from the National Defense University.

== Career ==
White served in the Peace Corps in Cameroon from 1971 to 1973. Prior to her appointment as ambassador, White worked for the United States Agency for International Development (USAID) beginning in 1978. With USAID, White served in Burkina Faso, Senegal and Haiti, Egypt and South Africa. From 1999 to 2001, she was the deputy director for East Africa.

Diplomatic posts
Preceded by Barry Wells	United States Ambassador to the Gambia; 2010–2012	Succeeded by Edward Alford
Preceded by Kenneth Merten	United States Ambassador to Haiti; 2012–2015	Succeeded by Peter Mulrean
