= Janet A. Sanderson =

American diplomat

Janet Ann Sanderson
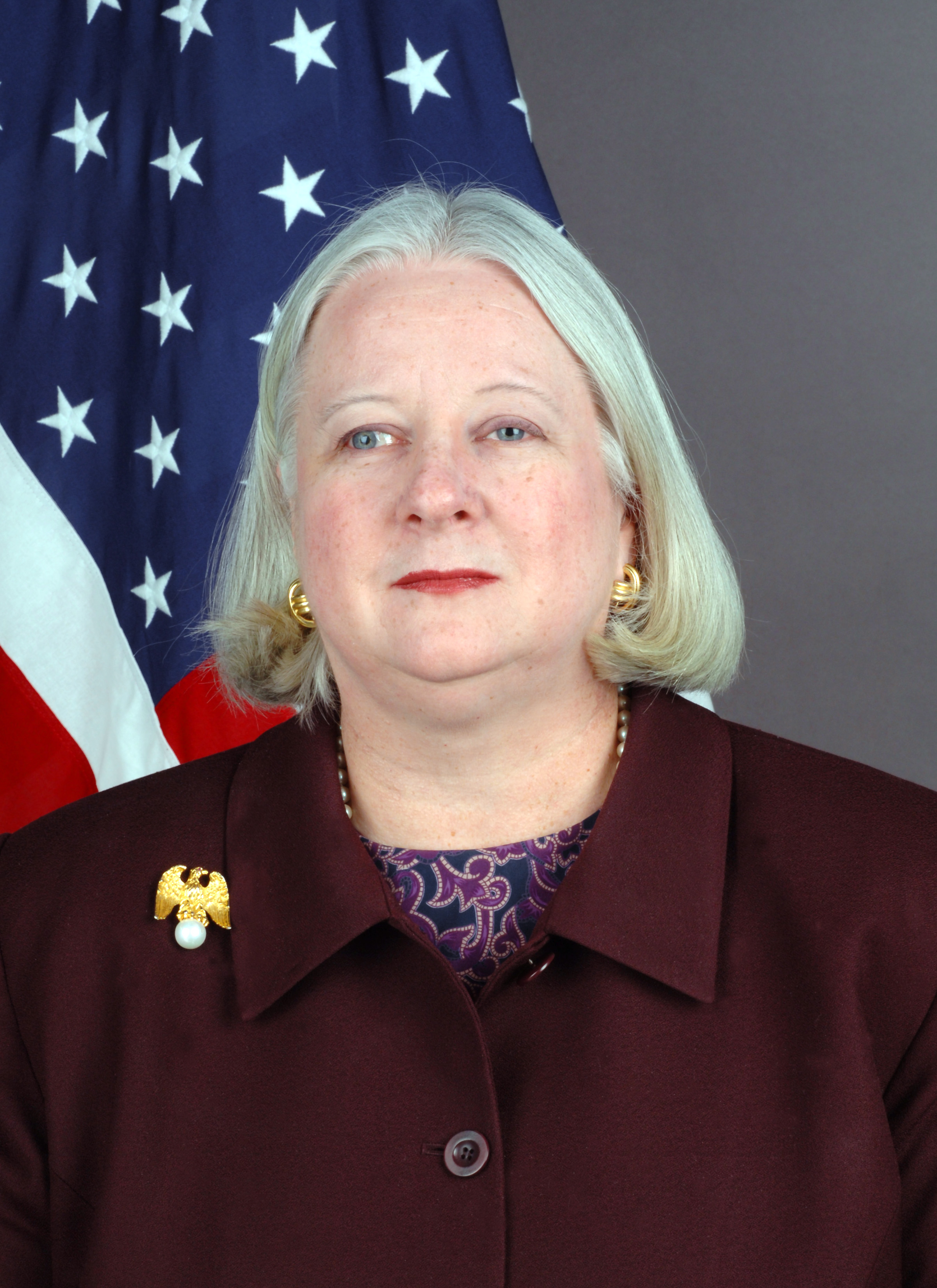
- Janet Sanderson in 2006
- Born: 1955 (age 70–71)
- Education: College of William and Mary, Naval War College
- Occupations: Diplomat, Adjunct Professor
- Years active: 1977–2011 (Foreign Service)
- Employer(s): U.S. State Department, Georgetown University
- Title: U.S. Ambassador to Haiti (2006–2008), U.S. Ambassador to Algeria (2000–2003), Deputy Assistant Secretary of State for Near East Affairs (2009–2011)
- Predecessor: James Brendan Foley (Haiti), Cameron R. Hume (Algeria)
- Successor: Kenneth H. Merten (Haiti), Robert Stephen Ford (Algeria)

Janet A. Sanderson

11th United States Ambassador to Algeria
- In office October 30, 2000 – May 13, 2003
- Preceded by: Cameron R. Hume
- Succeeded by: Richard W. Erdman

Janet Ann Sanderson (born 1955) is a former American diplomat and an adjunct professor of international relations at Georgetown University. During her 34-year career as a foreign service officer, she served as U.S. Ambassador to Haiti and U.S. Ambassador to Algeria, among other assignments. While Ambassador to Haiti her administration was subject to multiple Inspector's General queries but no adverse actions were ever taken.

Prior to joining the foreign service in 1977, she earned a B.A. from the College of William and Mary, and a master's degree in national security studies from the Naval War College.

She served as the Deputy Assistant Secretary of State for Near East Affairs in the U.S. State Department from July 2009 – August 2011.(2 years 2 months)

Diplomatic posts
Preceded by Cameron R. Hume	United States Ambassador to Algeria; 2000–2003	Succeeded by Robert Stephen Ford
Preceded by James Brendan Foley	United States Ambassador to Haiti; 2006–2008	Succeeded by Kenneth H. Merten
