= Julieta Valls Noyes =

American diplomat (born 1962)

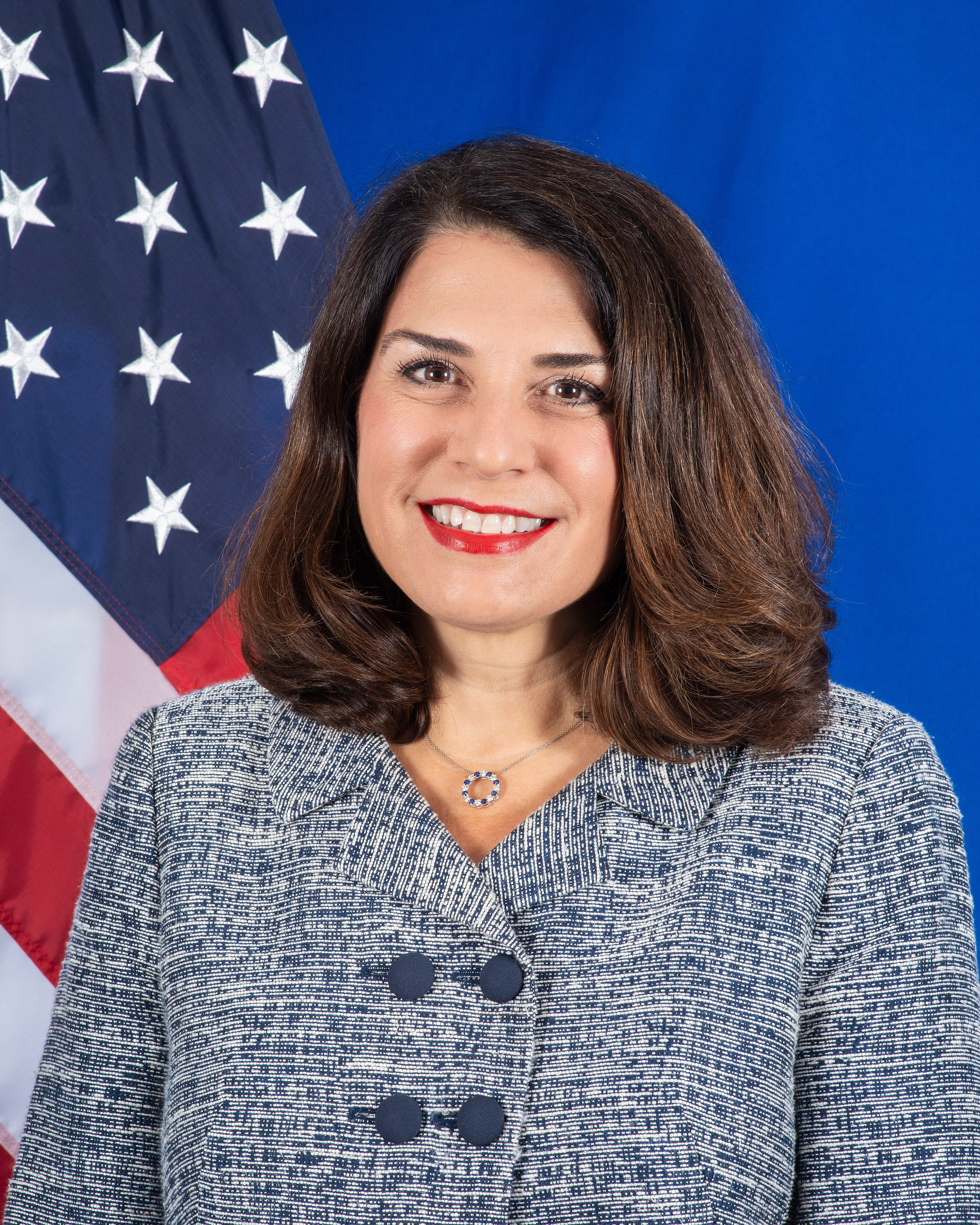

14th Assistant Secretary of State for Population, Refugees, and Migration
- In office March 31, 2022 – October 4, 2024
- President: Joe Biden
- Preceded by: Anne C. Richard (2017)
- Succeeded by: Andrew Veprek

United States Ambassador to Croatia
- In office October 5, 2015 – November 21, 2017
- President: Barack Obama; Donald Trump
- Preceded by: Kenneth Merten
- Succeeded by: Robert Kohorst

Personal details
- Born: 1962 (age 63–64)
- Spouse: Nick Noyes
- Education: Wellesley College (BA); National Defense University (MA)

Julieta Valls Noyes (born 1962) is an American diplomat who served as the Assistant Secretary of State for Population, Refugees, and Migration from 2022 to 2024 during the Biden administration. She previously served as the United States Ambassador to Croatia from 2015 to 2017 during the Obama administration. Noyes retired in October 2024.

== Early life and education ==
Noyes was born Julieta A. Valls, the daughter of Cuban refugees in the U.S. She graduated from Wellesley College in 1984. Because there was no International Relations major at Wellesley at the time, she created her own independent major, including studies in history and political science. During her junior year, she studied abroad in Geneva, Switzerland.

== Career ==
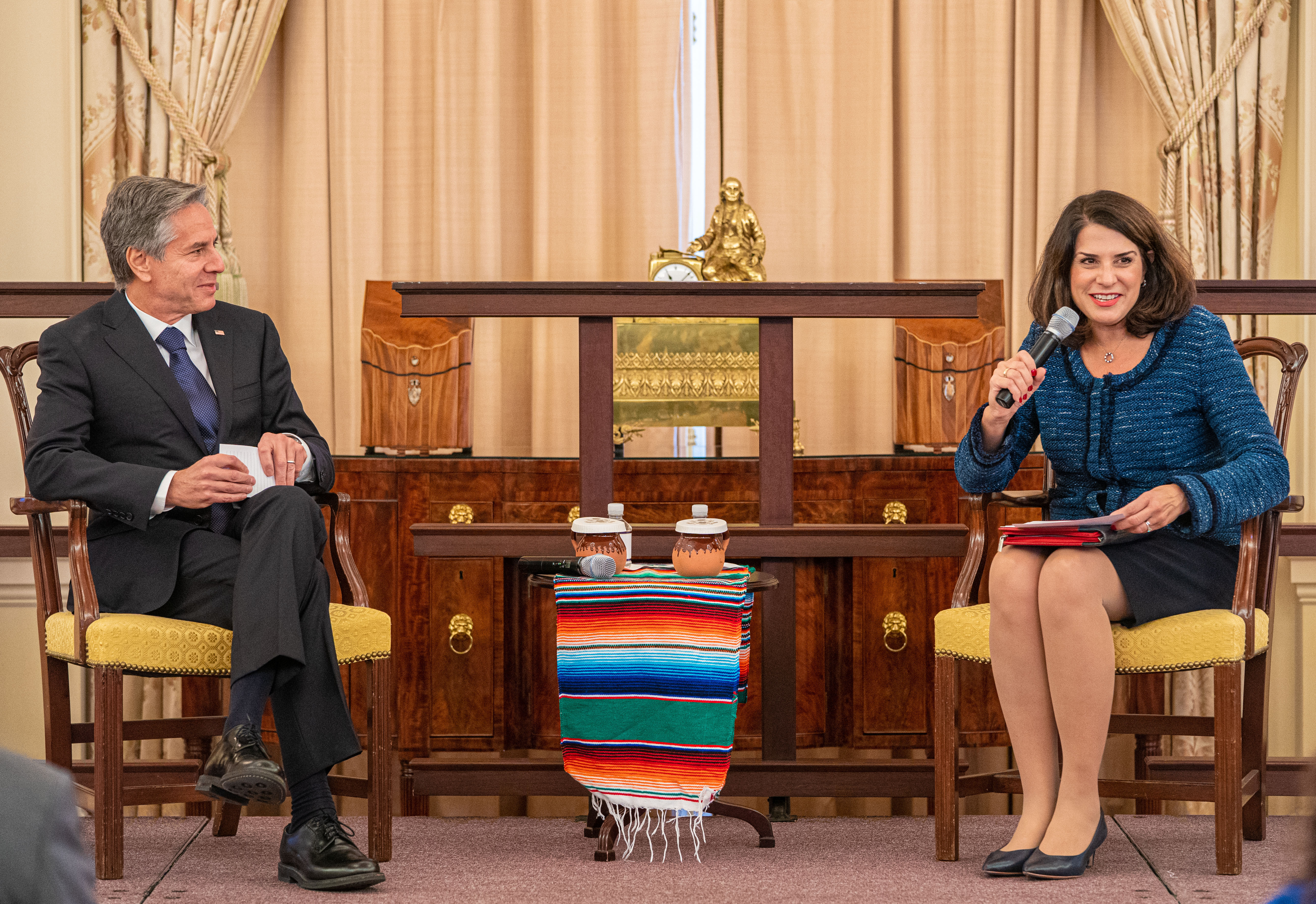
Noyes with Secretary of State Antony Blinken in 2022

Noyes is a career member of the U.S. Foreign Service. After joining the Foreign Service in 1985, she was assigned to positions in Panama, Spain, Mexico, and Guatemala. She served as Deputy Chief of Mission to the Holy See.

Some confidential communications Noyes wrote while assigned to the Vatican were published as part of WikiLeaks and revealed difficulties in the relationship between the Holy See and the Republic of Ireland, which was investigating sexual abuse in the Catholic Church.

In her role as the US deputy assistant secretary for European affairs, Noyes addressed issues with ISIL, and noted that "one of the paramount concerns" was cutting off ISIL funding. "The financing of this barbaric organisation allows it to continue its operations. What we have to do is degrade its abilities and ultimately to destroy it."

=== Ambassador to Croatia ===
On March 26, 2015, President Barack Obama nominated Noyes to be the ambassador to Croatia. Hearings were held on the nomination before the Senate Foreign Relations Committee on May 20, 2015. The committee favorably reported the nomination to the Senate floor on June 9, 2015. Noyes was confirmed by the entire Senate on June 24, 2015, via voice vote.

Upon arriving in Croatia, Noyes was received by Croatian Parliament Speaker Željko Reiner, who noted that Croatia would continue to be a key ally to the U.S. and within NATO. She was also welcomed by Prime Minister Tihomir Oreskovic, who underscored Croatia's friendship and alliance with the U.S.

In October 2018, Noyes began serving as deputy director of the Foreign Service Institute, the primary training institution for employees of the U.S. foreign affairs community.

=== Biden administration ===
On June 3, 2021, President Joe Biden nominated Noyes to serve as the Assistant Secretary of State for Population, Refugees, and Migration. On September 15, 2021, a hearing on her nomination was held before the Senate Foreign Relations Committee. On October 19, 2021, her nomination was reported favorably out of committee. Noyes was confirmed by the full United States Senate via voice vote on March 24, 2022. As Assistant Secretary for the Bureau of Population, Refugees, and Migration, Noyes has been sharply criticized internally. Several high-level retirements and resignations occurred during her tenure, including the public resignation of an employee who alleged that bureau ignored the findings of subject matter experts in relation to the delivery of humanitarian assistance in Gaza. The Federal Employee Viewpoint Survey showed a significant drop in workplace satisfaction during Noyes' tenure, with The Washington Post summarizing, "Getting the booby prize for the biggest plunge, by far, was the State Department's Bureau of Population, Refugees, and Migration. Its score plummeted from 74 in 2022 to 52.6 in 2023, a 21.4-point free fall."

Noyes retired in October 2024 after nearly 40 years in the United States Foreign Service.

== Personal life ==
In addition to English, Noyes speaks French, Italian, Portuguese and Spanish. She and her husband, Nick Noyes, have three children.

Diplomatic posts
Preceded by Kenneth Merten	United States Ambassador to Croatia; 2015–2017	Succeeded by Robert Kohorst
