= Whiting Willauer =

American diplomat (1906-1962)

Whiting Willauer (1906–1962) was an American ambassador to Costa Rica and Honduras. He is also considered as a key player during the 1954 operation against Arbenz in Guatemala.

== Biography ==
Whiting Willauer was born on November 30, 1906, in New York City, New York. Willauer received his graduation from Princeton University and from the Harvard University Law School.

From 1931 to 1939, he practiced admiralty law in Boston, Massachusetts. He served as an attorney in the Criminal Division of the Department of Justice.

From 1941 to 1944, he served as executive secretary of China Defense Supplies, Incorporated, and also served as director of the Far East and Special Territories Branch of the Foreign Economic Administration during 1944 to 1945.

Along with General Claire L. Chennault, Willauer founded the Civil Air Transport (CAT) company in China in 1946. He was its executive vice president and later he became its president, he remained associated with the Civil Air Transport Company from 1946 until his resignation in 1954. In 1950, Whiting Willauer sold CAT to the Central Intelligence Agency.

He served as ambassador to Honduras from 1954 to 1958 and to Costa Rica from 1958 until his retirement in 1961. One of his key tasks while serving as the U.S. Ambassador to Honduras, after his appointment on 5 February 1954, was to provide the CIA team within neighboring Guatemala with any assistance that they required in the overthrow of that Government of Guatemala led by Jacobo Arbenz Guzman; he was even instructed to report to the CIA via the Under Secretary of State, Walter Bedell Smith, who had previously been the Director of Central Intelligence.

After a short retirement, Whiting Willauer died on 6 August 1962 at Nantucket, Massachusetts.

Diplomatic posts
| Preceded by John Draper Erwin | United States Ambassador to Honduras; 5 March 1954 – 24 March 1958 | Succeeded by Robert Newbegin |
| Preceded by Philip Bracken Fleming | United States Ambassador to Costa Rica; 5 May 1958 – 17 April 1961 | Succeeded by Raymond Telles |
