= Nicole McGraw =

American diplomat

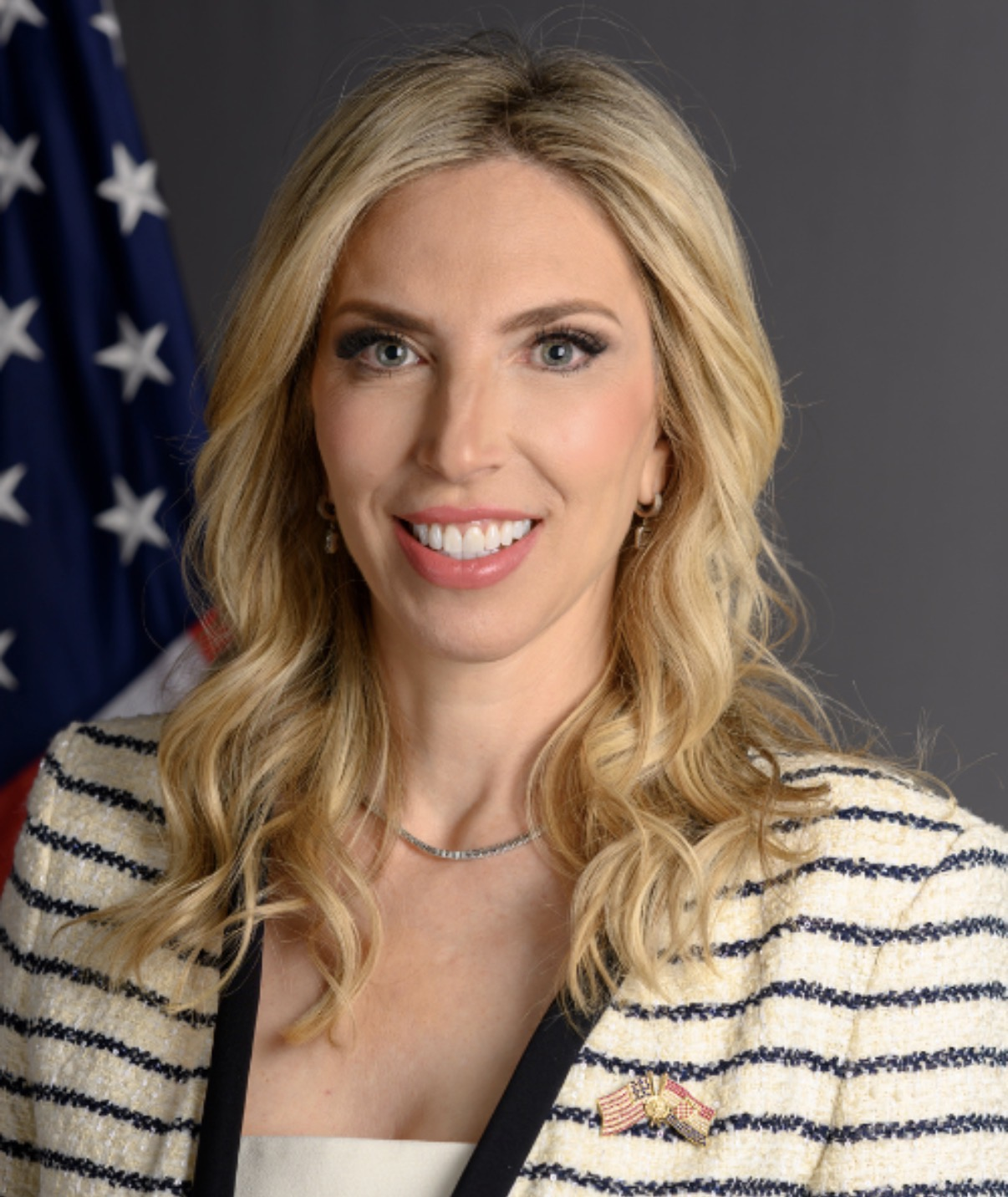
- Official portrait, 2025

United States Ambassador to Croatia
- Incumbent
- Assumed office October 21, 2025
- President: Donald Trump
- Preceded by: Nathalie Rayes

Personal details
- Born: Nicole Henry McGraw
- Education: Southern Methodist University (BA)

Nicole Henry McGraw is an American diplomat, philanthropist, and art collector who has served as the United States ambassador to Croatia since 2025.

== Early life and education ==
McGraw earned a bachelor's of fine arts from Southern Methodist University.

== Art career ==
In 2006, McGraw opened her first art gallery in Palm Beach Gardens, Florida. She also previously served as CEO of Jupiter NFT Group and founded CANVAS Art Charities. Her work earned the 2018 Muse Award for Outstanding Public Art.

== Diplomatic career ==
McGraw hosted a fundraiser for Donald Trump's presidential campaign in October 2024. In December 2024, then-President-elect Donald Trump announced his intention to nominate her to serve as the U.S. ambassador to Croatia. The announcement of her nomination came days after she donated $250,000 to the Trump inauguration committee.

The Senate formally received her nomination in March 2025, and the Senate Foreign Relations Committee held a hearing on her nomination on April 8, 2025. The Senate confirmed her nomination on October 7, 2025. McGraw presented her credentials on October 21, 2025.

== See also ==
- List of ambassadors of Croatia to the United States

Diplomatic posts
Preceded by Nathalie Rayes	United States Ambassador to Croatia; 2025–present	Incumbent
