= Benjamin F. Whidden =

American judge

Benjamin F. Whidden (1813–1896) was an attorney, judge, teacher, and diplomat from New Hampshire who served as the first United States Minister Resident to Haiti, serving from July 12, 1862 to February 23, 1865.

Whidden was a born in Greenland, New Hampshire, to Mary Nye (Goss) Whidden and Samuel Whidden, and grew up in Lancaster, New Hampshire. He worked on a farm when young to help pay to attend Kimball Union Academy. He then graduated from Dartmouth College in 1840.

Whidden taught at several schools in New Hampshire, including Lancaster Academy, and also in Virginia, where he spent time with Congressman Jared W. Williams (a later New Hampshire governor), with whom he studied for the bar exam. Whidden was admitted to the New Hampshire bar in 1847 and eventually founded a law firm in Lancaster. He served as Coos County solicitor and as a probate judge. He was initially a Democrat, but then became a Free Soiler and Republican. Whidden was elected to the New Hampshire House of Representatives in 1849, 1850 and 1867, where he advocated for the passage of the Homestead Act. In 1855 Whidden co-founded the Coos Mutual Fire Insurance Company.

In 1862 President Abraham Lincoln appointed him to be the first Commissioner/Consul General to Haiti. He served until 1865, when he resigned due to contracting malaria and other illnesses. In the 1870s Whidden served as a presidential elector for Rutherford Hayes.

Whidden died in Portland, Maine, and was buried in Lancaster, New Hampshire. Whidden had one son from his first wife before her death in 1868, and two children from his second wife before her death, but both died in childhood. Some of his correspondence is held at the Library of Congress.
