= Robin Diallo =

American diplomat

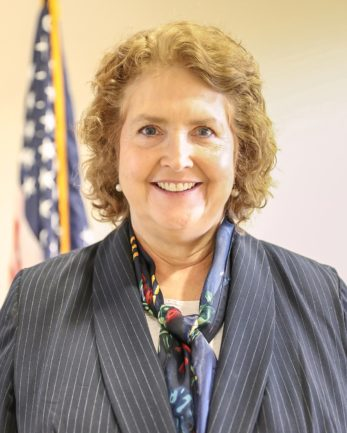

United States Ambassador to Haiti Charge d' affaires
- In office August 25, 2017 – February 21, 2018
- President: Donald Trump
- Preceded by: Brian Shukan (Charge d'affaires)
- Succeeded by: Michele J. Sison

Personal details
- Born: Robin Diallo
- Children: 3
- Education: University of Southern California; Michigan State University

Robin Diallo is an American diplomat who was the Deputy Chief of Mission at the U.S. Embassy in Haiti, serving under President Donald Trump.

== Career ==
In her early career in public diplomacy, Diallo served as a volunteer for the American Peace Corps in Niger from 1984 to 1988. From 2014 to 2016, she served as Director of Public Diplomacy in the Bureau of East Asian and Pacific Affairs of the U.S. State Department in Washington, DC. She later served as the Minister Counselor for Public Affairs at the American Embassy in Baghdad, Iraq.

On August 25, 2017, Diallo became the United States Ambassador to Haiti (chargé d'affaires), upon the departure of charge d' affaires Brian Shukan. She stepped down from office upon the installment of Michele Sison as permanent Ambassador, at which point Diallo will become Deputy Chief of Mission to the Haitian Embassy.

In January 2018, after U.S. President Donald Trump questioned why the U.S. was accepting refugees from Haiti, the Haitian government summoned Diallo to meet with the Haitian president so they could voice their disapproval.

Diplomatic posts
Preceded by Brian Shukan (Charge d'affaires)	United States Ambassador to Haiti (Charge d'affaires); 2017–2018	Succeeded by Michele Sison
