= W. Robert Kohorst =

American attorney, businessman and ambassador (born 1953)

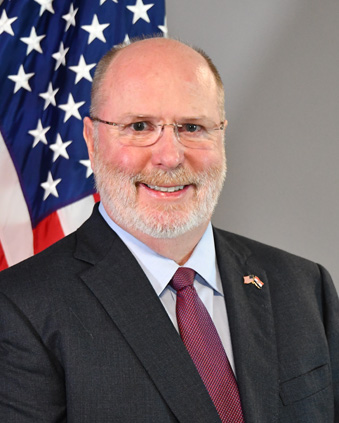

United States Ambassador to Croatia
- In office January 10, 2018 – January 13, 2021
- President: Donald Trump
- Preceded by: Julieta Valls Noyes
- Succeeded by: Nathalie Rayes

Personal details
- Born: William Robert Kohorst; February 21, 1953 (age 73) Cincinnati, Ohio, U.S.
- Party: Republican
- Spouse: Shelley Allen
- Children: 2
- Education: University of Dayton (BS); University of Michigan (JD)

William Robert Kohorst (born February 21, 1953) is an American attorney and businessman who served as United States Ambassador to Croatia from January 2018 to 2021.

== Early life and education ==
Kohorst is the son of William Robert and Mary Helen Kohorst.

He graduated from La Salle High School in Pasadena, California, in 1971. He graduated with honors from the University of Dayton with a Bachelor of Science in accounting, in 1975. and earned a Juris Doctor from the University of Michigan Law School in 1978.

== Career ==
Kohorst started his career as a law clerk with Judge Engel at the United States Court of Appeals for the Sixth Circuit in 1978. In 1979, he then went on to work as an attorney for a law office in California, where he made partner in 1982.

Afterwards, Kohorst worked as an investment banker for what later became a Fortune 1000 company and stayed until he founding his own firm, Private placement Group for Public Storage, Inc., a U.S. real estate syndicator, in 1984.

He worked as President in this position until 1990, when he bought two companies and became CEO and principal of Tiger Shark Golf, Inc. and Masquerade International, Inc. and also began serving as President of RK Holdings, Inc. In 1991, Kohorst co-founded KH Financial, Inc., which later became Everest Properties, a company that purchases and operates apartment, self-storage, and retail properties. In 2002, Kohorst began working for Maxus Realty, Inc. and stayed with the company until 2015. From 2015 until 2017, Kohorst served as Director of Posey Company. Today Kohorst is the President, CEO, Chairman and Director of multiple businesses within the Everest Group.

Kohorst donated over $1.1 million to Republican national and state committees and candidates from 2015 to 2017.

He was nominated as United States Ambassador to Croatia in early September 2017, testified before the Senate on October 5 and was confirmed by Senate voice vote on November 2, 2017.

== Additional affiliations ==
Kohorst has served as director and chairman of the San Gabriel chapter of the Young Presidents' Organization, regent of Loyola Marymount University, since 2009 trustee of La Salle College Preparatory, and president of the San Gabriel Valley Council of the Boy Scouts of America.

Kohorst is also a trustee of the Maxus Realty Trust.

Through the Kohorst Allen Family Foundation, which was established in 2008, the family has donated more than $1 million to La Salle College Preparatory and is part of the Saint Benilde Society.

== Personal life ==
Kohorst is married to Shelley Allen, they have two sons and two grandchildren.

Diplomatic posts
Preceded by Julieta Valls Noyes	United States Ambassador to Croatia; 2018–2021	Succeeded by Nathalie Rayes
