= Ernest Preeg =

American economist from Virginia

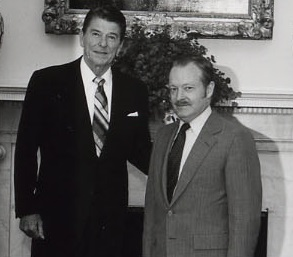
- 1981 (on right)

United States Ambassador to Haiti
- In office 1981–1983
- President: Ronald Reagan
- Preceded by: Henry L. Kimelman
- Succeeded by: Clayton E. McManaway, Jr.

Personal details
- Born: 5 July 1934
- Died: 5 April 2017 (aged 82)
- Education: State University of New York Maritime College; The New School of Social Research

Ernest Henry Preeg (5 July 1934 – 5 April 2017) was an American economist from Virginia. He holds a B.S. in Marine Transportation from State University of New York Maritime College, an M.A. and Ph.D. in Economics from The New School of Social Research in New York City. He has served as U.S. Ambassador to Haiti from 1981 to 1983. He was a Senior Fellow with the Manufacturers Alliance (MAPI). Later, he gave testimony to Congress and the U.S. China Security Review Commission on manipulation of U.S. currency by China and Japan. In 2008, he presented at the Alfred P. Sloan Industry Studies Conference: Innovation in Global Industries.

== Biography ==
He has served in numerous academic and government positions including Senior Economic Advisory for the Philippines, Executive Director of the Economic Policy Group for the White House Staff, Deputy Assistant Secretary of State for International Finance and Development, Director for the Office of European Communities and OECD Affairs. He has published numerous books and articles on international trade and economics. In 2008 he published India and China: An Advanced Technology Race and How the United States Should Respond.

Diplomatic posts
Preceded by Henry L. Kimelman	United States Ambassador to Haiti; 1981–1983	Succeeded by Clayton E. McManaway, Jr.
