= Kenneth H. Merten =

American diplomat (born 1961)

Kenneth Merten
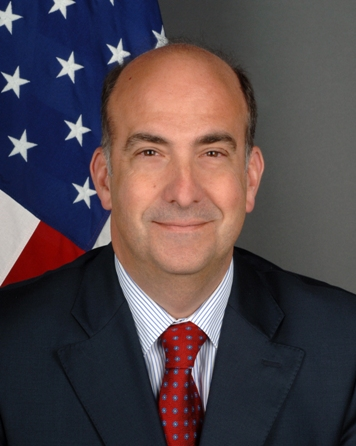

United States Ambassador to Bulgaria
- In office April 7, 2023 – January 29, 2025
- President: Joe Biden; Donald Trump
- Preceded by: Herro Mustafa
- Succeeded by: H. Martin McDowell (Chargé d'affaires)

Special Coordinator for Haiti
- In office August 17, 2015 – January 2017
- President: Barack Obama
- Preceded by: Thomas C. Adams

United States Ambassador to Croatia
- In office October 30, 2012 – July 18, 2015
- President: Barack Obama
- Preceded by: James Foley
- Succeeded by: Julieta Valls Noyes

United States Ambassador to Haiti
- In office August 25, 2009 – July 20, 2012
- President: Barack Obama
- Preceded by: Janet Sanderson
- Succeeded by: Pamela White

Personal details
- Born: 1961 (age 64–65) St. Louis, Missouri, U.S.
- Spouse: Susan Merten
- Children: 2
- Education: Miami University (BA)

Kenneth H. Merten (born 1961) is an American diplomat. Merten has served in various positions in the Department of State beginning in 1987, most notably as ambassador to Haiti from 2009 to 2012, ambassador to Croatia from 2012 to 2015, and special coordinator for Haiti from 2015 to 2017. From 2023 to 2025 was United States ambassador to Bulgaria.

== Early life ==
Merten was born in St. Louis, Missouri, but moved to Hudson, Ohio when he was twelve, and considers Hudson his home.

He attended Hudson Junior High School and the Walsh Jesuit High School and credits a history teacher named Mark Massa with being influential in his choice of career. Merten graduated from Walsh Jesuit in 1979, and went to Miami University, where he graduated from in 1983 with a BA in diplomacy and foreign affairs. He has also studied at Aix-Marseille University, the University of Graz and the American University.

== Diplomatic career ==
Merten joined the United States Foreign Service in 1987. He holds the rank of Career Minister. Since then, he has served both at Department of State facilities in Washington, DC and international assignments. Prior to his appointment as ambassador to Haiti, his international experience consisted of assignments in Paris, Brussels and Bonn. He also served in Haiti as vice consul and economic counselor between 1988 and 1990 and between 1998 and 2000 respectively. In 2009, he was appointed to the position of ambassador to Haiti, and began his duties as such on 24 August 2009. In 2012, he was appointed to the position of ambassador to Croatia and began his duties as such on 30 October 2012.

As Haiti Special Coordinator during the 2015-2016 Haitian presidential election Merten traveled to Haiti and spoke about an upcoming verification commission report on fraud in the election, saying "We hope it is very, very quick and does not change the results of the election" in April 2016. He was joined by other U.S. officials pushing for quickly accepted elections. He left the post in January 2017 during the presidential transition of Donald Trump.

From 2017 to 2019, Merten held the position of acting principal deputy assistant secretary for the Bureau of Western Hemisphere Affairs. From 2019 to 2022, he served as the principal deputy assistant secretary for the Office of the Director General of the Foreign Service; during 2021, he also served as the senior bureau official for the Bureau of Global Talent Management.

=== Nomination as U.S. ambassador to Bulgaria ===
On June 8, 2022, President Joe Biden nominated Merten to serve as the United States ambassador to Bulgaria. On November 29, 2022, hearings on his nomination were held before the Senate Foreign Relations Committee. On December 7, 2022, the committee favorably reported the nomination to the Senate. On December 13, 2022, his nomination was confirmed in the Senate by voice vote. He was sworn in by Acting Deputy Secretary John R. Bass on February 3, 2023, and presented his credentials to President Rumen Radev on April 7, 2023.

== Honors and awards ==
In July 2012, President Michel Martelly of Haiti awarded Merten with the National Order of Honour and Merit to the rank of Grand Cross for his diplomatic excellence and all his works done for Haiti.

== Personal life ==
Merten is married to Susan Greenman Merten, with whom he has had two daughters, Caryl and Elisabeth. He speaks Haitian Creole, French, German and Spanish.

Political offices
Preceded by Richard Verma	Assistant Secretary of State for Legislative Affairs; Acting; 2011	Succeeded by David Adams
Preceded by Francisco Palmieri	Principal Deputy Assistant Secretary for Western Hemisphere Affairs; Acting; 2017	Succeeded by Julie J. Chung
Diplomatic posts
Preceded by Janet Sanderson	United States Ambassador to Haiti; 2009–2012	Succeeded by Pamela White
Preceded by James Brendan Foley	United States Ambassador to Croatia; 2012–2015	Succeeded by Julieta Valls Noyes
Preceded by Thomas Adams	Special Coordinator for Haiti; 2015–2017	Office disbanded
Preceded by Herro Mustafa	United States Ambassador to Bulgaria; 2023–present	Incumbent
