= Christian C. Gross =

American diplomat (1895-1933)

Christian C. Gross (1895-1933) was an American soldier, diplomat, and author who served in Haiti. He was Chargé d’Affaires ad interim in Haiti from October 1926 until November 1927.

He was born in Chicago. Charles W. Gross was his father.

He graduated from the University of Illinois in 1917. He studied law in Paris. In 1922 he married in Algiers.

He married Virginia Harriso, the daughter of Francis Burton Harrison, a U.S. congressman who served as Governor General of the Philippines from 1913 to 1921. They divorced and he filed a paternity suit over her daughter Anna an heiress, after his ex-wife was remarried to a dancer.

In 1919 he received a Distinguished Service Cross for "extraordinary herosim" during his service in Siberia.

He refereed a polo match between military personnel at Champ de Mars.

William Seabrook reported that Gross lived in Paris for several years. In Haiti, he belonged to the American Country Club to which no Haitian, not even the country's president, were allowed admittance.

Gross reportedly said of U.S. Marines in Haiti, "So long as they are here, there is no meed for their being here."

In 1928 her returned from Paris to his post as Secretary of Legation in Port au Prince after vacationing in Europe.

He died in a car crash near Fort Lauderdale that also killed his mother and his two children.

== Book ==
- Siberia's Untouched Treasure: Its Future Role in the World (1923)

== See also ==
- List of ambassadors of the United States to Haiti
- United States occupation of Haiti
