= Robert Newbegin II =

American diplomat

Robert Newbegin II (February 5, 1905 – November 15, 1991) was an American diplomat.

== Early life and career ==
Born in Bangor, Maine, he was raised in Cambridge, Massachusetts and graduated from Yale University. He entered the Foreign Service in 1929 and served in Berlin, Montevideo, Mexico City, Istanbul, Ankara, Santo Domingo, Bogota and Paris, as well as Washington.

He was appointed a Foreign Service inspector in 1952, director of the Office of Middle American Affairs in the State Department in 1954 and deputy assistant secretary of state for personnel in 1956.

Newbegin served as U.S. ambassador to Honduras from 1958 to 1960, when he became ambassador to Haiti. He retired from the Foreign Service in 1962, but was a State Department negotiator on the Panama Canal treaty the next year.

While Ambassador to Haiti in 1961, Newbegin was recalled to Washington prior to the inauguration of dictator François Duvalier, in protest of his fraudulent election. A Marine colonel stationed in Haiti once referred to Newbegin as an "extremely decisive and strong-willed Ambassador", a judgement echoed in other sources. In a state department briefing during the recall, however, Newbegin expressed the opinion that there was no credible opposition in Haiti to Duvalier, and thus that the recall would have little positive effect. Newbegin was right, in that the US cut off economic assistance in 1962 and Duvalier appointed himself President for Life in 1964. While ambassador, Newbegin instituted a French-language training programme among US government personnel there, and urged Americans to step up their contributions to Haitian charities.

Diplomatic posts
Preceded by Whiting Willauer	United States ambassador to Honduras; 1958–1960	Succeeded by Charles R. Burrows
Preceded by Gerald A. Drew	United States ambassador to Haiti; 1960–1961	Succeeded by Raymond L. Thurston
