= Gerald A. Drew =

American diplomat

Gerald Drew
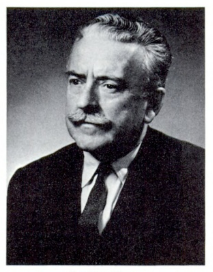

2nd Inspector General of the Department of State
- In office November 13, 1960 – May 31, 1962
- President: Dwight D. Eisenhower; John F. Kennedy
- Preceded by: Raymond Miller
- Succeeded by: Norris Haselton

United States Ambassador to Haiti
- In office May 15, 1957 – July 16, 1960
- President: Dwight D. Eisenhower
- Preceded by: Roy Davis
- Succeeded by: Robert Newbegin

United States Ambassador to Bolivia
- In office December 8, 1954 – April 6, 1957
- President: Dwight D. Eisenhower
- Preceded by: Edward Sparks
- Succeeded by: Philip Bonsal

4th Director General of the Foreign Service
- In office March 30, 1952 – October 18, 1954
- President: Harry S. Truman; Dwight D. Eisenhower
- Preceded by: Richard P. Butrick
- Succeeded by: Raymond A. Hare

United States Envoy to Jordan
- In office February 24, 1950 – February 25, 1952
- President: Harry S. Truman
- Preceded by: Wells Stabler (Acting)
- Succeeded by: Joseph Green

Personal details
- Born: June 20, 1903 San Francisco, California, U.S.
- Died: September 27, 1970 (aged 67) Lewes, Delaware, U.S.
- Resting place: Rock Creek Cemetery; Washington, D.C., U.S.
- Education: University of California, Berkeley (BA)

Gerald Augustin Drew (June 20, 1903 - September 27, 1970) was a career Foreign Service Officer for the United States.

== Biography ==
Born in San Francisco, California, Drew was a graduate of the University of California, Berkeley where he was a member of Phi Kappa Tau. He served as U.S. Vice Consul in Pará, 1929; Envoy to Jordan, 1949-1950; United States representative to United Nations Special Committee on the Balkans [UNSCOB]; 1950–52; Ambassador to Bolivia, 1954–57; Ambassador to Haiti, 1957–60. He was assigned to Haiti by the Dwight D. Eisenhower administration at the beginning of the regime of François Duvalier. He criticized the Duvalier government, and Duvalier requested his removal, but this was rejected by Christian Herter.

He died at Lewes, Delaware, and is buried at Rock Creek Cemetery, Washington, D.C.

Diplomatic posts
Preceded by Wells Stabler; Acting	United States Envoy to Jordan; 1950–1952	Succeeded by Joseph Green
Preceded by Edward Sparks	United States Ambassador to Bolivia; 1954–1957	Succeeded by Philip Bonsal
Preceded by Roy Davis	United States Ambassador to Haiti; 1957–1960	Succeeded by Robert Newbegin
