= Donald Kimelman =

American journalist

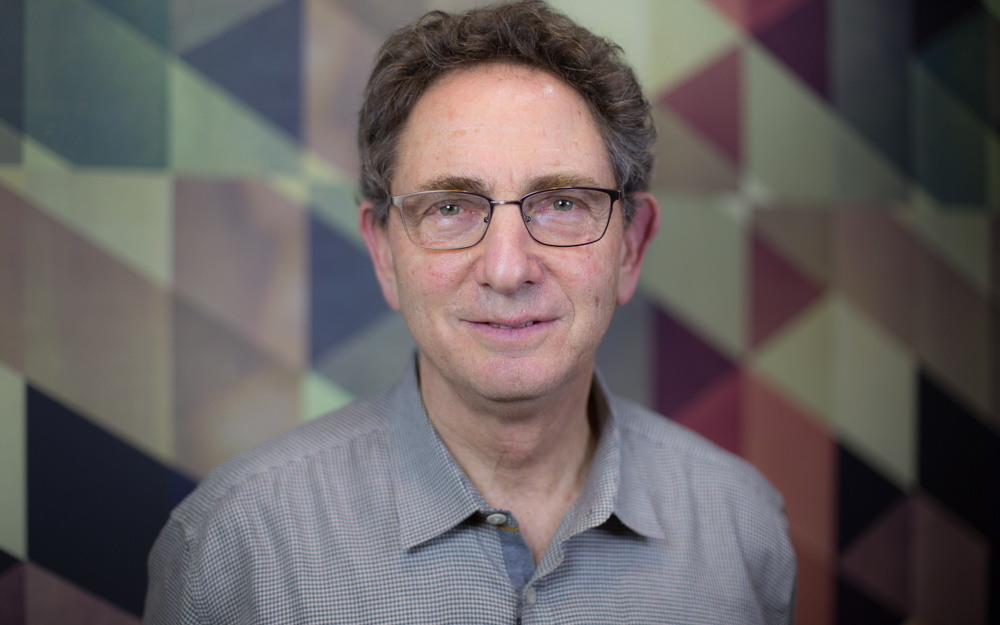
- Education: Lawrenceville School; Yale University; Columbia University
- Employers: The Philadelphia Inquirer; The Pew Charitable Trusts
- Board member of: Mastery Charter Schools; Pew Research Center; William Penn Foundation
- Father: Henry L. Kimelman

Donald Kimelman is an American journalist and former managing director of The Pew Charitable Trusts, who continues to serve on the Pew Research Center's board. He is the son of Henry L. Kimelman, who served as United States Ambassador to Haiti.

== Early life and education ==
Donald Kimelman is the son of Henry L. Kimelman, who served as United States Ambassador to Haiti. He attended Lawrenceville School, an independent university-preparatory school in Lawrenceville, New Jersey. Kimelman received his bachelor's degree in political science from Yale University and a master's degree from the Columbia University Graduate School of Journalism.

== Career ==
=== Journalism ===
Kimelman was a journalist for more than 25 years. Before working for The Philadelphia Inquirer from 1979 to 1997, he wrote for The Capital, a daily newspaper published in Annapolis, Maryland, and The Baltimore Sun. In 1981, he received the Education Writers Association's "Fred M. Hechinger Grand Prize for Distinguished Education Reporting", along with Mary Bishop and Thomas Ferrick, Jr., for their work at the Inquirer. Kimelman worked on local, national, and international assignments. After serving as the Inquirer's Houston-based national correspondent, then as a Moscow correspondent, he became an editor and served on the editorial board for seven years, where he often wrote about social policy and urban issues. In 1986, Kimelman was accused by Sovetskaya Rossiya of being a spy. Furthermore, the Russian political newspaper accused him of "distorting Soviet life and falsely implied that he was an alcoholic".

Kimelman served as deputy editor of the Inquirer's editorial page. During his tenure, he wrote the controversial "Poverty and Norplant" editorial, which was published on December 12, 1990, two days after the contraceptive Norplant was approved by the Food and Drug Administration. In the piece, he commented on Norplant's approval and suggested providing women on welfare monetary incentives to use the contraceptive in an effort to reduce the number of black children who live in poverty. The editorial reportedly divided the newspaper's staff. Kimelman said, "I feel bad about it. Certain things as a white man you just don't see. I still believe what I wrote, but ... I felt very bad that every single black reporter and editor I know, from the most radical to the most reasonable, hated this editorial."

=== Pew ===
Kimelman served as managing director of The Pew Charitable Trusts' "information initiatives" program, including its venture fund, until July 2013. The initiatives program was "a portfolio of projects that, through nonpartisan, rigorous research, [sought] to enlighten the general public, journalists and policy makers about contemporary issues and trends". Much of this work was executed by the Pew Research Center, where Kimelman served as chairman of the board of directors. Kimelman also managed Pew's "Philadelphia Program", which included civic and culture initiatives, the Pew Fund for Health and Human Services, and the Philadelphia Research Initiative.

=== Board service and philanthropy ===
After leaving Pew, Kimelman served on the board of trustees of Mastery Charter Schools, a charter school network in Philadelphia and Camden, New Jersey, and the William Penn Foundation's board of directors. He also served on the board of MASS Design, a Boston-based nonprofit organization that provides "infrastructure, buildings, and the human and physical systems necessary for growth, dignity, and well-being in developing countries". He continues to serve as chairman of Pew Research Center's board, a position he has held since 2004.

Kimelman has contributed to a variety of organizations, including the Barnes Foundation, Committee to Protect Journalists, Philabundance, Philadelphia Museum of Art, Saint Thomas Historical Trust, Thomas Jefferson Foundation, and Philadelphia's Wilma Theater.

== Works ==
- Bishop, Mary; Ferrick, Thomas; Kimelman, Donald (September 2, 1981). "The Shame of the Schools: The Obstacles are Many, the Rewards are Few". The Philadelphia Inquirer. 1
- Bishop, Mary; Ferrick, Thomas; Kimelman, Donald (September 3, 1981). "The Shame of the Schools: Falling Apart at the Seams". The Philadelphia Inquirer.
- Kimelman, Donald (December 12, 1990). "Poverty and Norplant: Can Contraceptives Reduce the Underclass?". The Philadelphia Inquirer. p. A18.
- Kimelman, Donald (January 30, 1991). "Notorious Norplant Editorial Gets Thoughtful, Positive Responses". The Morning Call.
- Kimelman, Donald (March 17, 1991). "The Norplant Editorial Writer Responds". The Washington Post. p. D6.
- Kimelman, Donald (Spring 2004). "The Pew Global Attitudes Project: Giving World Publics a Greater Voice". Council of American Ambassadors.
- Wray, Steve; Kimelman, Donald; Houstoun, Feather (November 6, 2008). "PGW has potential to change". The Philadelphia Inquirer – via Economy League of Greater Philadelphia.
- Kimelman, Donald (April 20, 2009). "A 'hybrid' path for saving newspapers". The Boston Globe. Boston Globe Media Partners.
