= Roy T. Davis =

American diplomat

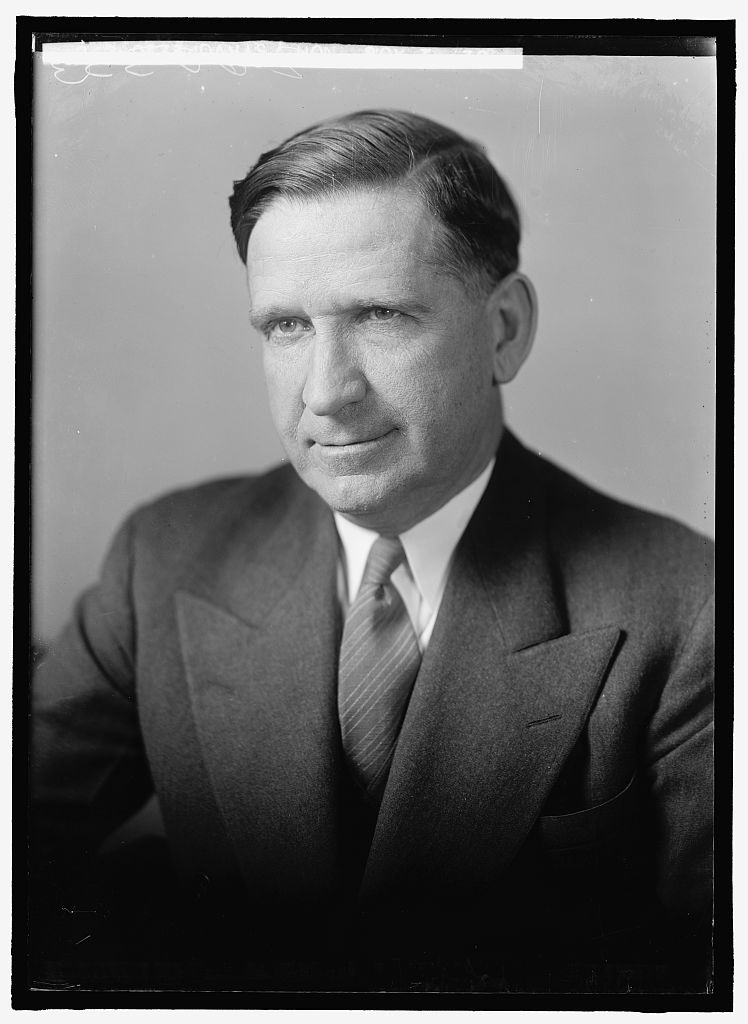

6th United States Ambassador to Haiti
- In office September 23, 1953 – March 9, 1957
- President: Dwight D. Eisenhower
- Preceded by: Howard Karl Travers
- Succeeded by: Gerald A. Drew

Member of the Maryland Senate from the Montgomery County district
- In office 1947–1951

10th United States Minister to Panama
- In office March 14, 1930 – September 20, 1933
- President: Herbert Hoover; Franklin D. Roosevelt
- Preceded by: John Glover South
- Succeeded by: Antonio Cornelius Gonzalez

United States Minister to Costa Rica
- In office March 14, 1922 – January 4, 1930
- President: Warren G. Harding; Calvin Coolidge; Herbert Hoover
- Preceded by: Walter C. Thurston (Acting); Edward J. Hale
- Succeeded by: Charles C. Eberhardt

Personal details
- Born: June 4, 1889 Ewing, Missouri, U.S.
- Died: December 27, 1975 (aged 86) Silver Spring, Maryland, U.S.
- Party: Republican
- Education: Brown University

Roy Tasco Davis (June 4, 1889 – December 27, 1975) was an American diplomat who served as ambassador to Costa Rica, Haiti, and Panama.

Born in Ewing, Missouri, on June 4, 1889, Davis received his education from the public schools of Missouri, and from Brown University, from which he graduated in 1910.

Nominated by President Warren G. Harding on February 7, 1922, to become minister to Costa Rica, he served in that position from 1922 to 1930.

After service abroad, Davis served as a member of the Maryland State Senate from 1947 to 1951.

He later served as ambassador to Haiti during the administration of Dwight D. Eisenhower.

Roy Tasco Davis died on December 27, 1975, in Silver Spring, Maryland, at the age of 86.

Diplomatic posts
Preceded by Howard K. Travers	United States Ambassador to Haiti; 1953–1957	Succeeded by Gerald A. Drew
