= Nathalie Rayes =

American diplomat (born 1975)

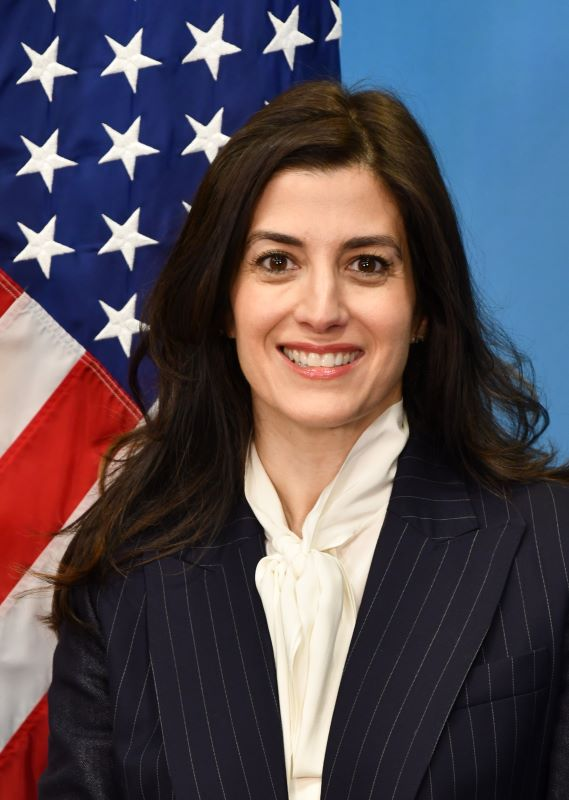

United States Ambassador to Croatia
- In office January 25, 2024 – January 20, 2025
- President: Joe Biden
- Preceded by: W. Robert Kohorst
- Succeeded by: Nicole McGraw

Personal details
- Born: January 12, 1975 (age 51) Anaco, Venezuela
- Education: University of California, Los Angeles (BA, MPP)

Nathalie Rayes (born January 12, 1975) is an American diplomat who served as the United States Ambassador to the Republic of Croatia. Most recently, she was president and CEO of Latino Victory. She chaired the Hispanic Federation and the Hispanas Organized for Political Equality (HOPE) Binational Advisory Group and was a board member of the Aspen Institute Latinos and Society Program. In 2022, Rayes was appointed by President Joe Biden to serve as a board member of the United States Institute of Peace. In 2023, she was nominated by the United States President Joe Biden as US ambassador to Croatia. She was confirmed by the Senate on December 6, 2023, in a bipartisan 53–47 vote. She presented her credentials to Croatian President Zoran Milanović on January 25, 2024.

== Background and education ==
Nathalie Rayes and her parents moved from Venezuela to Marina del Rey, California, when she was nine. Her father died soon after moving to the United States.

Rayes earned a B.A. in Sociology and an M.P.P. with concentrations in International Relations and Education, at the University of California, Los Angeles.

== Career ==
Nathalie Rayes was previously president and CEO of Latino Victory. She also chaired the Hispanic Federation and the Hispanas Organized for Political Equality (HOPE) Binational Advisory Group, served as vice chair of the Planned Parenthood Action Fund, and was a board member of the Aspen Institute Latinos and Society Program. She was also on the boards of Congressional Hispanic Leadership Institute (CHLI) and Congressional Hispanic Caucus Institute (CHCI).

In 2014, she was appointed by President Barack Obama to serve on the board of the Woodrow Wilson Center. In 2022, Rayes was appointed by President Joe Biden to the board of the United States Institute of Peace. In 2023, she was nominated by the United States President Joe Biden as US ambassador to Croatia.

Rayes started her career as a field deputy and later Senior Policy Advisor to Los Angeles council member Mike Feuer. Afterwards, Rayes served as chief of staff to Los Angeles mayor James Hahn. She was Vice President of public affairs for Grupo Salinas in the United States and executive director of Fundación Azteca America. In 1998, she was a State Department fellow in the U.S. Embassy in Cairo in the economic political section.

=== U.S. Ambassador to Croatia ===
In 2023, Rayes was nominated by the United States President Joe Biden as U.S. ambassador to Croatia and subsequently confirmed by the United States Senate on December 6, 2023. She was sworn into the role on December 11, 2023, and presented her credentials to Croatian President Zoran Milanović on January 25, 2024, becoming the first Venezuelan-American to hold the post.

Upon arriving in Croatia, Rayes met with Croatia’s Deputy Prime Minister and Defence Minister Ivan Anušić on January 29, 2024. Minister Anušić underscored the importance of deepening bilateral defense cooperation. Rayes highlighted Croatia’s support for Ukraine as exemplary. Discussions included ongoing US military assistance, such as the delivery of Bradley fighting vehicles and approval for the sale of UH-60M Black Hawk helicopters and HIMARS rocket launchers to Croatia.

Rayes also supported economic initiatives, including the expansion of the Krk LNG terminal, and advocated for legislation to screen foreign investments. In the fall of 2024, she hosted a regional summit of U.S. ambassadors in Zagreb to coordinate diplomatic efforts across the Balkans.

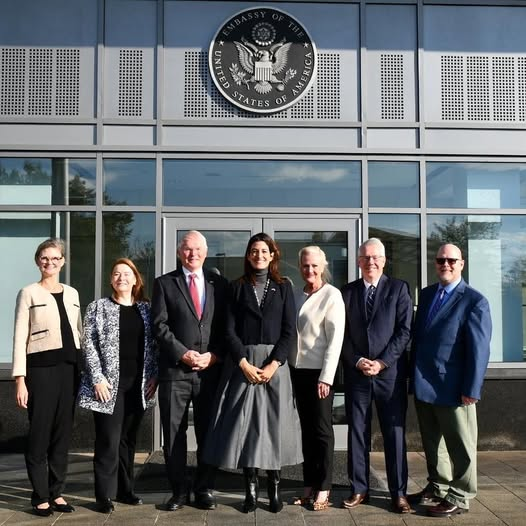
Chiefs of U.S. diplomatic missions from Albania, BiH, Kosovo, Montenegro, North Macedonia, and Serbia attending the Chief of Missions regional conference in Zagreb hosted by U.S. Ambassador Nathalie Rayes in September 2024.

== Honors and awards ==
In 2016, UCLA Luskin of Public Affairs recognized Nathalie Rayes as "Alumna of the Year". In 2021, she was named among the "25 Most Powerful Latinas" in People en Español magazine. Rayes has been recognized by Huffington Post in the group "40 Under 40 Latinos in Foreign Policy" as one of the most influential Latina leaders in international policy. Other awards include in 2021 and 2022, Association of Latino Professionals for America (ALPFA) Most Powerful Latinas, in 2021 AL DÍA Archetype Ambassador Manuel Torres Award, and in 2013, Santa Monica College Distinguished Alumna Recognition Award for Outstanding Professional and Community Service.

In April 2025, the Hispanic Federation awarded Rayes its 2025 Humanitarian Award for a "distinguished career" that "spans government, philanthropy, corporate leadership, and international diplomacy— grounded in a deep commitment to public service."

== Personal life ==
She is married to Dr. Tarek Samad, a neuroscientist, and they have two sons, Julian and Alexander.

Diplomatic posts
Preceded by Robert Kohorst	United States Ambassador to Croatia; 2024–2025	Succeeded by Nicole McGraw
