= List of ambassadors of the United States to Croatia =

Ambassador of the United States to Croatia
- Seal of the United States Department of State

- Flag of a United States ambassador

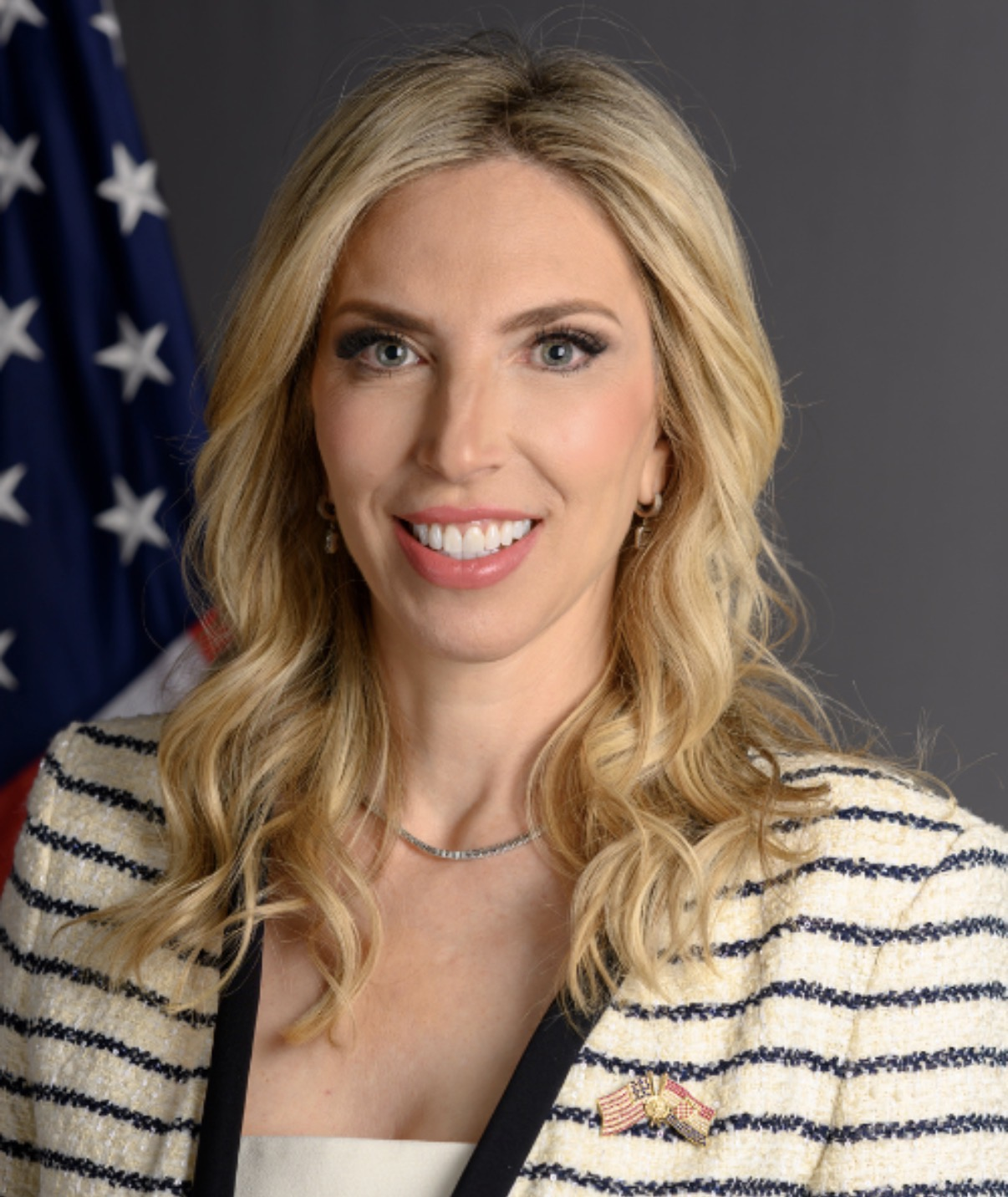
- Incumbent; Nicole McGraw since October 21, 2025
- Status: Incumbent
- Residence: Embassy of Croatia, Washington, D.C.
- Nominator: The president of the United States
- Appointer: The president with Senate advice and consent
- First holder: Peter Galbraith
- Website: U.S. Embassy - Zagreb

The United States Ambassador to Croatia oversees the diplomatic protocol and bilateral relations of the United States and Croatia. The office was created on April 7, 1992, following the independence of Croatia with an initial U.S. presence in Croatia dating back to May 9, 1946, in the capital city of Zagreb. Croatia has an embassy in Washington, D.C., with general consulates in Chicago, Los Angeles, and New York City. The U.S. has an embassy in Zagreb.

== List of U.S. ambassadors to Croatia ==
Ambassador			Term in office		
#	Portrait	Name	Took office	Left office	Appointed by
1		Peter Galbraith	June 28, 1993	January 3, 1998	Bill Clinton
2		William Dale Montgomery	January 8, 1998	September 17, 2000	Bill Clinton
3		Lawrence G. Rossin	January 19, 2001	June 27, 2003	Bill Clinton
4		Ralph Frank	July 2, 2003	January 7, 2006	George W. Bush
5		Robert Bradtke	July 7, 2006	July 13, 2009	George W. Bush
6		James B. Foley	September 15, 2009	August 19, 2012	Barack Obama
7		Kenneth H. Merten	October 30, 2012	July 18, 2015	Barack Obama
8		Julieta Valls Noyes	October 5, 2015	November 21, 2017	Barack Obama
9		Robert Kohorst	January 10, 2018	January 20, 2021	Donald Trump
10		Nathalie Rayes	January 25, 2024	January 20, 2025	Joe Biden
11		Nicole McGraw	October 21, 2025	Present	Donald Trump

== See also ==
- Foreign relations of Croatia
- Croatian Americans and the Croatian diaspora
