= James Brendan Foley =

United States diplomat

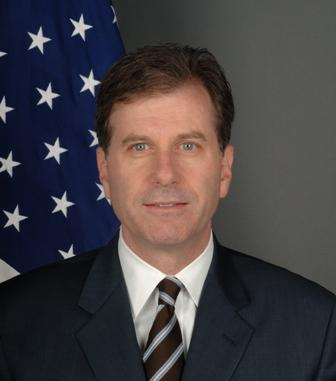

United States Ambassador to Haiti
- In office May 27, 2003 – August 14, 2005
- President: George W. Bush
- Preceded by: Brian Dean Curran
- Succeeded by: Janet A. Sanderson

United States Ambassador to Croatia
- In office September 15, 2009 – August 19, 2012
- President: Barack Obama
- Preceded by: Robert Bradtke
- Succeeded by: Kenneth H. Merten

Personal details
- Born: April 4, 1957 (age 69)
- Education: State University of New York at Fredonia; Fletcher School of Law and Diplomacy

James Brendan Foley (born April 4, 1957) is a retired American foreign service officer. He served as the United States Ambassador to the Republic of Haiti from May 27, 2003, to August 14, 2005, and as the United States Ambassador to the Republic of Croatia from September 15, 2009, to August 19, 2012. As Ambassador to Haiti, Foley participated in the late-night negotiations between Haitian President Jean Bertrand Aristide and U.S. Secretary of State Colin L. Powell leading to Aristide's February 29, 2004 resignation and acceptance of a U.S. offer to fly him into exile.

== Early life and education ==
Foley was born in Buffalo, New York. He received his B.A. in 1979 from the State University of New York at Fredonia and M.A.L.D. in 1984 from the Fletcher School of Law and Diplomacy.

== Professional career ==
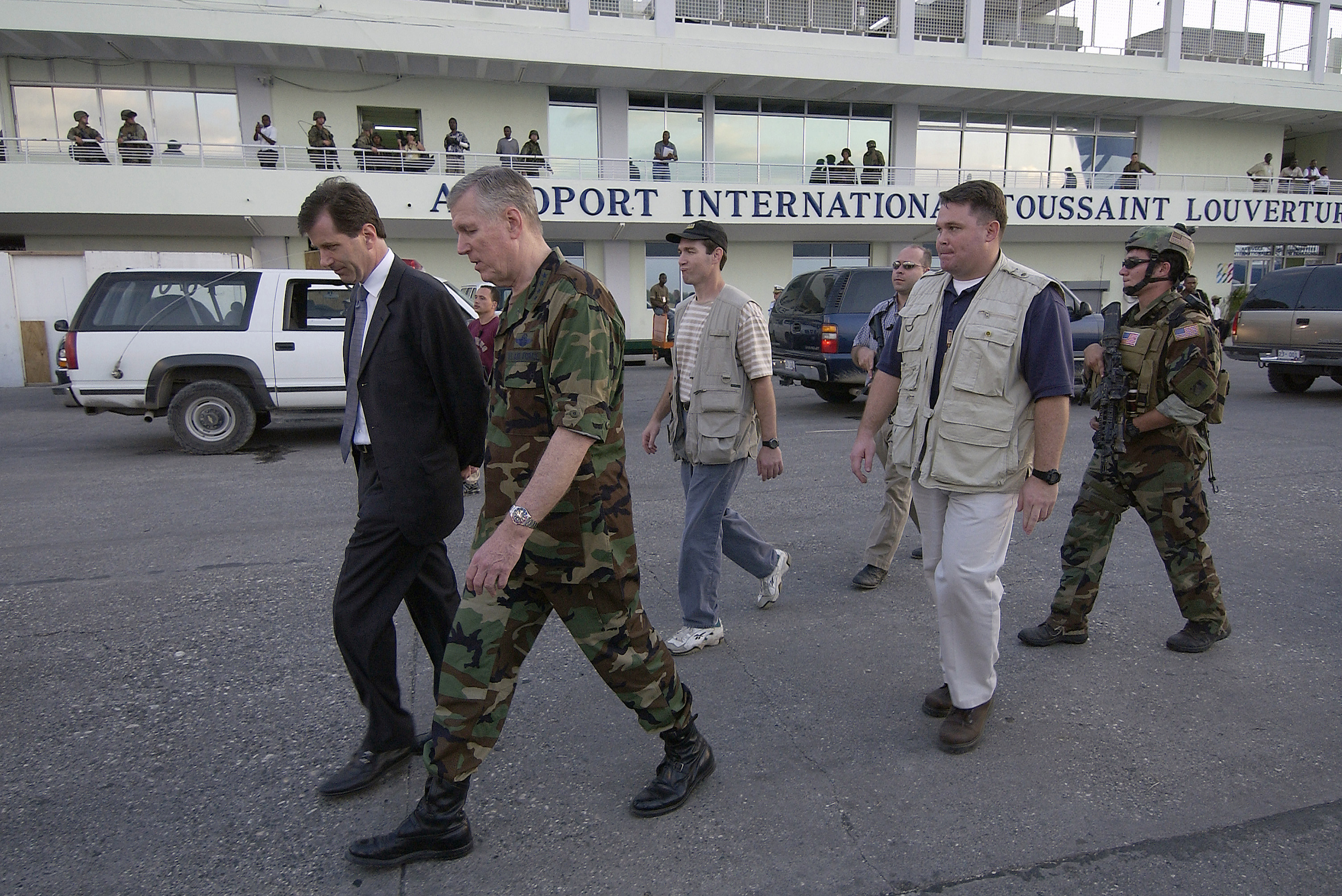
U.S. Ambassador to Haiti James Foley with Chairman of The Joint Chiefs of Staff General Richard B. Myers at Port-au-Prince International Airport, March 2004.

Foley is a former member of the Senior Foreign Service. He served from 2007 to 2009 as the State Department's Senior Coordinator for Iraqi Refugee Issues, working to alleviate the plight of several million Iraqis displaced by the war. Previously, he served as faculty member and Deputy Commandant of the National War College, as a Diplomat-in-Residence, and as Deputy Permanent Representative to the United Nations in Geneva from 2000 to 2003.

He joined the Foreign Service in 1983 and served overseas as vice consul and political officer in Manila, Philippines and as political officer in Algiers, Algeria. Foley was a speechwriter and adviser to former Secretary of State Lawrence S. Eagleburger from 1989 to 1993 and deputy director of the Private Office of the NATO Secretary General in Brussels, Belgium from 1993 to 1996. He was special assistant to the late Senator Paul Coverdell and served as State Department Deputy Spokesman from 1997 to 2000.

Diplomatic posts
Preceded by Brian Dean Curran	United States Ambassador to Haiti; 2003–2005	Succeeded by Janet Ann Sanderson
Preceded by Robert Bradtke	United States Ambassador to Croatia; 2009–2012	Succeeded by Kenneth H. Merten
