= H. Martin McDowell =

American diplomat

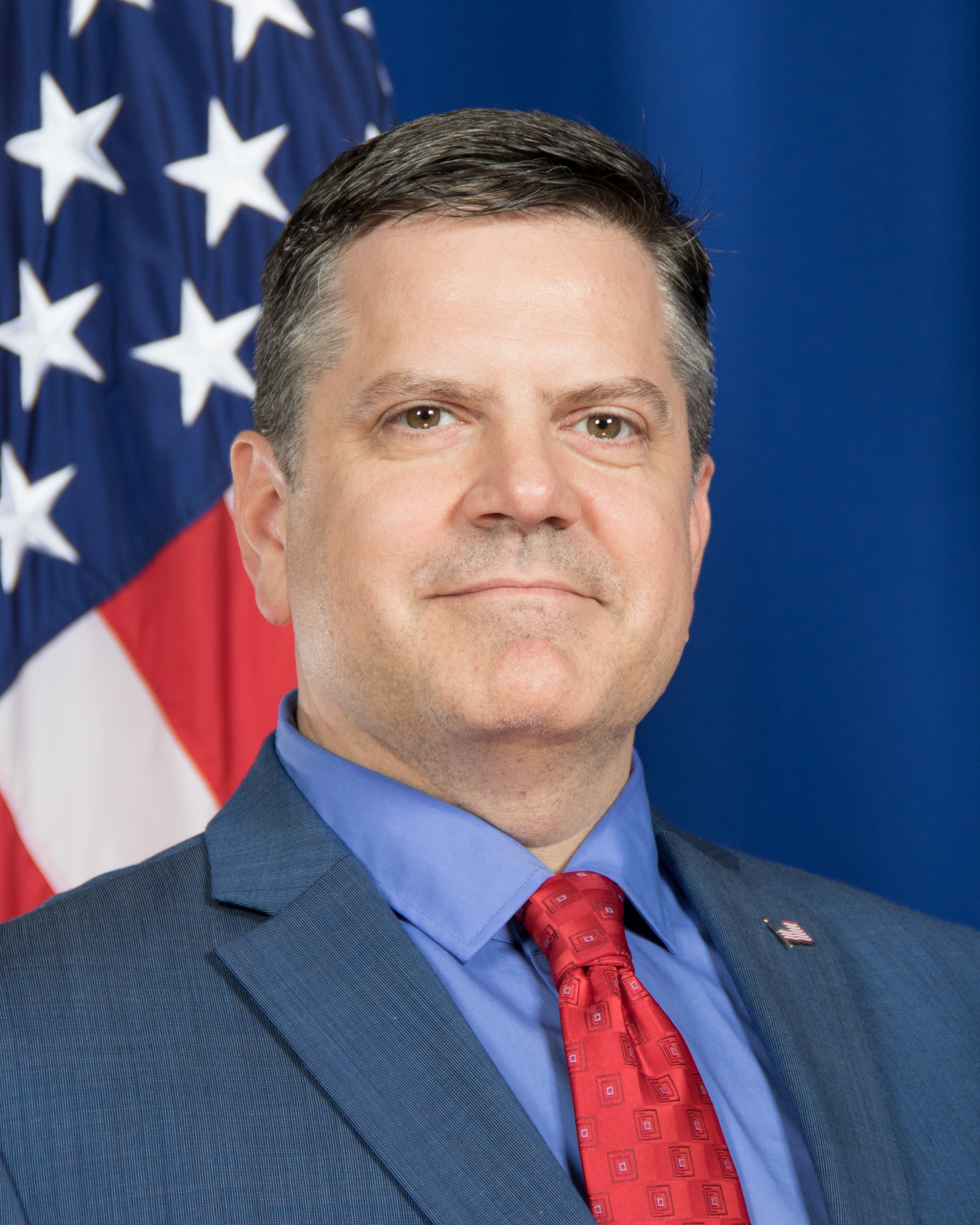
H. Martin McDowell

H. Martin McDowell is an American diplomat and career member of the Senior Foreign Service. He is currently the deputy chief of mission at the U.S. Embassy in Sofia, Bulgaria.

In 2025, he served as Chargé d’Affaires ad interim following the departure of Ambassador Kenneth Merten. McDowell has held several senior diplomatic roles, including deputy chief of mission in Moldova and director of the Office of South Central European Affairs at the U.S. Department of State.

== Early life and education ==
McDowell was born and raised in Cullman, Alabama. He earned a master’s degree from Alabama State University in 1996. In 2010, he completed a master of strategic studies at the U.S. Army War College.

== Career ==
McDowell joined the U.S. Foreign Service around 1998 and has focused on European and Eurasian affairs throughout his career of more than 20 years.

Before his assignment to Bulgaria, McDowell was deputy chief of mission at the U.S. Embassy in Chișinău, Moldova. His overseas postings have included U.S. embassies in Ljubljana, Slovenia; Bratislava, Slovakia; San Salvador, El Salvador; and Chișinău, Moldova.

At the U.S. Department of State in Washington, D.C., McDowell has held several leadership positions related to European policy. He served as director of the Office of South Central European Affairs, overseeing U.S. relations with Western Balkan countries.

In September 2024, McDowell became deputy chief of mission at the U.S. Embassy in Sofia, Bulgaria, serving as the embassy’s second-ranking diplomat and chief operating officer.

== Leadership ==
Although McDowell is a career diplomat, he has not been nominated for a Senate-confirmed ambassadorship as of early 2025. Following the resignation of U.S. Ambassador Kenneth Merten in January 2025, he served as Chargé d’Affaires ad interim at the U.S. Embassy in Sofia, acting as the head of mission during the transition period. He held the position until February 18, 2025, when Susan Falatko assumed the role. McDowell then returned to his position as deputy chief of mission.

== Personal life ==
McDowell is married and has two daughters. He speaks several languages related to his diplomatic assignments.
