= Henry E. Peck =

American abolitionist and diplomat

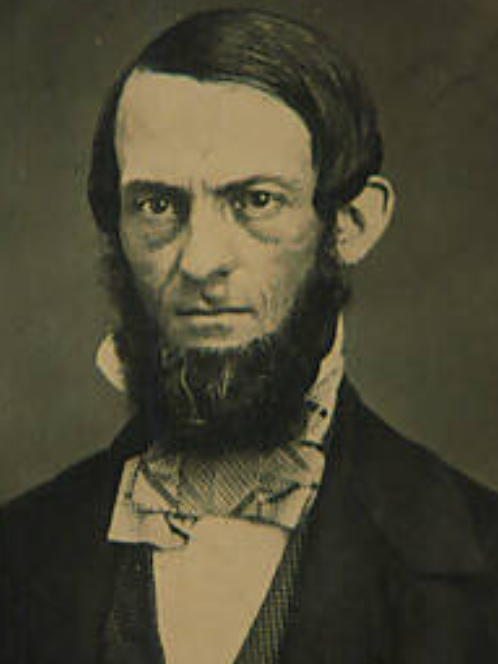
Henry Peck, abolitionist professor from Oberlin College in Ohio and ambassador to Haiti

Henry Everard Peck (1821–1867) was professor, abolitionist, and diplomat from Ohio who served as the second United States Minister Resident to Haiti, serving from 1865 to 1867.

Henry E. Peck was born in Rochester, New York to Everard Peck. Peck was a nephew of the reformer Almira Porter Barnes. He attended the Oneida Institute and graduated from Bowdoin College in Maine. He then studied theology at Oberlin College and eventually served as a professor at Oberlin from 1852 to 1865 where he was active in the abolitionist movement. He was arrested for being a leader of the abolitionist Oberlin–Wellington Rescue where freed slaves were harbored on the Oberlin campus. In 1865 he was appointed as the second United States Minister Resident to Haiti, serving from 1865 to 1867 when he died in Haiti of yellow fever.
