= Arthur Bailly-Blanchard =

American diplomat (1855–1925)

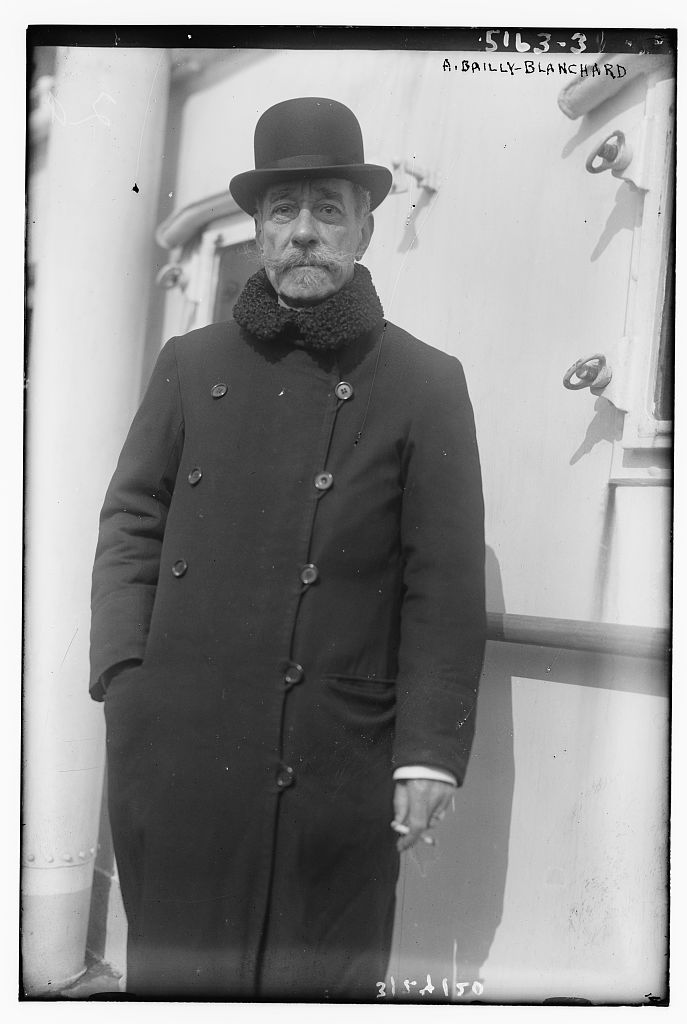
Arthur Bailly-Blanchard in 1920

Arthur Bailly-Blanchard (October 1, 1855 - August 23, 1925) sometimes written Arthur Bailey-Blanchard was an American diplomat. He was the American ambassador to Haiti from 1914 to 1921. He was born on October 1, 1855, in New Orleans, Louisiana, to T. Bailly-Blanchard Jr. and Jeanne Eliza Field.

In 1900 he was appointed the third secretary at the embassy in Paris, France. He was the American ambassador to Haiti from 1914 to 1921. He was ambassador during turbulent times in the history of Haiti, arriving there on a US battleship.

He died on August 25, 1925, at the Mount Royal Hotel in Montreal.
