= Henry L. Kimelman =

American diplomat

United States Ambassador to Haiti
- In office August 27, 1980 – February 18, 1981
- President: Jimmy Carter; Ronald Reagan
- Preceded by: William Bowdoin Jones
- Succeeded by: Ernest Henry Preeg

Personal details
- Born: Henry Lee Kimelman; January 21, 1921 Brooklyn, New York, U.S.
- Died: November 9, 2009 (aged 88) West Palm Beach, Florida, U.S.
- Party: Democratic
- Spouse: Charlotte Kessler (m. 1943)
- Children: Donald Kimelman
- Education: New York University
- Occupation: Businessman, diplomat

Henry L. Kimelman (January 21, 1921 – November 9, 2009) was an American businessman, political adviser and diplomat.

The Kimelman family were Eastern European immigrants who settled in Brooklyn, New York. His father, Sigmund, was a textile manufacturer. His mother's name was Caroline. They had three children: Benedict, Henry and Claire. The family were middle class until declaring bankruptcy during the Great Depression. Kimelman joined the Naval Reserves under the V7 Program as an officer. He was later attached with the Seabees in the Aleutian Islands. He attained the rank of Lieutenant (junior grade). He both married and graduated in 1943.

In 1948, Kimelman began ties with the U.S. Virgin Islands through his father-in-law Sidney Kessler. Kessler was a businessman who owned a rum distillery and later expanded the hotel industry on St. Thomas. This was the beginning of Kimelman's lucrative career. He was president of the Virgin Isle Hotel, the largest resort in Saint Thomas, U.S. Virgin Islands, from 1950 to 1960. He was also chairman of the board and CEO of Island Block Corp. from 1955 to 1980, and chairman and CEO of the West Indies Corp. from 1969 to 1980.

His involvement in politics began with his appointment as a delegate from the U.S. Virgin Islands to the Caribbean Organization. In 1962, President John F. Kennedy appointed him to the United States Delegation to the Independence Ceremonies of both Trinidad and Tobago and Jamaica. He served as the first Commissioner of Commerce, Industry and Tourism for the United States Virgin Islands from 1961 to 1964. He was a director and chairman of the executive committee of Diners Club and served on the board of the American Hotel Association. In 1967, during the Johnson Administration, he was appointed chief of staff to United States Secretary of the Interior Stewart Udall. In 1968, the President appointed him to the board of the newly created National Park Foundation.

His political work for the Democratic Party landed him on the master list of Nixon political opponents. He was chairman of the board, and finance chairman of the George McGovern presidential committee in 1972. He was deputy chairman and finance chairman of Senator Frank Church's presidential campaign in 1976, and a senior political adviser to Gary Hart's presidential campaign in 1988. In 1981, he was made partner at investment bank LF Rothschild. He semi-retired in 1990.

Kimelman served as the United States ambassador to Haiti from 1980 to 1981. He was the first US ambassador to be awarded Haiti's highest civilian decoration, the Grand Cross of Honor and Merit. The governor of the Virgin Islands proclaimed February 4, 1998, "Henry L. Kimelman Day." Ambassador Kimelman also has been honored by the government of Israel. In 2004, Dakota Wesleyan University awarded him an honorary doctorate in Humane Letters. He was co-chair of the Council of American Ambassadors, and chairman of its endowment fund.

Diplomatic posts
Preceded by William B. Jones	United States Ambassador to Haiti; 1980–1981	Succeeded by Ernest H. Preeg
