= Barry L. Wells =

Barry L. Wells (born 1942, Columbus, Ohio) is a career member of the Senior Executive Service who served as the American Ambassador to Gambia. He was also an Associate Professor and Assistant Dean at Howard University Graduate School of Social Work from 1972–1978.

Wells graduated from East High School in Columbus in 1959 and went on to earn his Bachelor of Arts degree in Psychology from Youngstown State University in 1966 and a Master’s in Social Work from the University of Pittsburgh in 1970.

He joined the State Department’s Foreign Service Institute in 1988, ultimately serving as Deputy Director. Condoleezza Rice appointed Wells the Department of State’s first Chief Diversity Officer on January 22, 2007.

== LGBT issues in Gambia ==
Former Gambian President Yahya Jammeh said in May 2008 that laws "stricter than those in Iran" against homosexuals would soon be introduced and vowed to "cut off the head" of any homosexual caught in the country. On 15 May 2008, Jammeh gave homosexuals 24 hours to leave the country. He also commanded "all those who harbour such individuals to kick them out of their compounds, noting that a mass patrol will be conducted on the instructions of the [Inspector General of Police] ... and the director of the Gambia Immigration Department to weed bad elements in society". He said, "Any hotel, lodge[,] or motel that lodges this kind of individuals will be closed down, because this act is unlawful. We are in a Muslim dominated country and I will not and shall never accept such individuals in this country".

President Jammeh said in a speech before newly promoted army chiefs on 7 December 2009, "We will not encourage lesbianism and homosexuality in the military. It is a taboo in our armed forces. I will sack any soldier suspected of being a gay or lesbian in the Gambia. We need no gays in our armed forces." Jammeh advised the army chiefs to monitor the activities of their men and deal with soldiers bent on practicing lesbianism in the military.
