= Irving Florman =

American diplomat

Irving Florman (1892, in Poland – May 9, 1981, in Manhattan) was appointed U.S. Ambassador to Bolivia by President Harry Truman. His appointment was based on what was considered “unorthodox” qualifications because he “had been a Manhattan inventor (cigarette lighters, mine detectors), and a sometime Broadway lyric-writer (Chauve-Souris, 1943).”

He served as Ambassador from November 1949 until September 1951, when he resigned for health reasons.

Prior to being his ambassadorship, he worked as a research and mechanical engineer, an inventor and a Broadway producer and songwriter. It's been reported he was “an associate of ... Morris Gest ... and had a long friendship with the producer David Belasco.

A resident of Manhattan at the time of his death, he died at Roosevelt-St. Luke's Hospital.
