= List of ambassadors of the United States to Haiti =

Ambassador of the United States to Haiti Anbasadè de la Etazini an Ayiti
- Seal of the United States Department of State

- Flag of a United States ambassador
- Nominator: The president of the United States
- Appointer: The president; with Senate advice and consent
- Inaugural holder: Benjamin F. Whidden as Commissioner/Consul General
- Formation: July 12, 1862
- Website: ht.usembassy.gov

This is a list of United States ambassadors to Haiti.

== Ambassadors ==
Name	Background	Title	Appointment	Presentation of credentials	Termination of mission	Notes
Benjamin F. Whidden		Commissioner/Consul General	July 12, 1862	October 1, 1862	Left post, February 23, 1865	
Henry E. Peck		Commissioner/Consul General	March 14, 1865	September 2, 1865	Promoted to Minister Resident/Consul General	
Henry E. Peck		Minister Resident/Consul General	August 6, 1866	October 11, 1866	Died at post, June 9, 1867	
Gideon H. Hollister		Minister Resident/Consul General	February 5, 1868	On or shortly before June 6, 1868	Presented recall, September 7–8, 1869	
Ebenezer D. Bassett		Minister Resident/Consul General	April 16, 1869	September 7–8, 1869	Presented recall, November 27, 1877	
John M. Langston		Minister Resident/Consul General	September 28, 1877	November 27, 1877	Presented recall, June 30, 1885	
George W. Williams		Minister Resident/Consul General	March 2, 1885			
John E. W. Thompson		Minister Resident/Consul General	May 7, 1885	June 30, 1885	Relinquished charge about October 17, 1889	
Frederick Douglass		Minister Resident/Consul General	June 26, 1889	November 14, 1889	Left post, July 30, 1891	
John S. Durham		Minister Resident/Consul General	September 3, 1891	October 3, 1891	Presented recall, November 7, 1893	
Henry M. Smythe		Minister Resident/Consul General	September 15, 1893	November 7, 1893	Left post on or shortly after March 9, 1897	
William F. Powell		Envoy Extraordinary and Minister Plenipotentiary	June 17, 1897	August 20, 1897	Left post about November 30, 1905	
Henry W. Furniss		Envoy Extraordinary and Minister Plenipotentiary	November 23, 1905	December 30, 1905	Presented recall, September 17, 1913	
Madison R. Smith		Envoy Extraordinary and Minister Plenipotentiary	August 15, 1913	September 30, 1913	Left post, July 8, 1914	
Arthur Bailly-Blanchard	Foreign Service officer	Envoy Extraordinary and Minister Plenipotentiary	May 22, 1914	November 15, 1915	Left post, September 26, 1921	
James Clement Dunn		Chargé d'Affaires ad interim		April 1922	February 1924	
George R. Merrell, Jr.		Chargé d'Affaires ad interim		March 1924	October 1926	
Christian Gross		Chargé d'Affaires ad interim		October 1926	November 1927	
Christian Gross		Chargé d'Affaires ad interim		April 1928	December 1928	
Stuart E. Grummon		Chargé d'Affaires ad interim		December 1928	November 1930	
Dana G. Munro	Foreign Service officer	Envoy Extraordinary and Minister Plenipotentiary	June 28, 1930	November 16, 1930	Left post, September 14, 1932	
Norman Armour	Foreign Service officer	Envoy Extraordinary and Minister Plenipotentiary	July 25, 1932	November 7, 1932	Recess appointment expired, March 4, 1933	
Norman Armour	Foreign Service officer	Envoy Extraordinary and Minister Plenipotentiary	March 17, 1933	April 11, 1933	Left post, March 21, 1935	
George A. Gordon	Foreign Service officer	Envoy Extraordinary and Minister Plenipotentiary	June 5, 1935	September 6, 1935	Left post, July 21, 1937	
Ferdinand L. Mayer	Foreign Service officer	Envoy Extraordinary and Minister Plenipotentiary	July 13, 1937	November 18, 1937	Left post, November 29, 1940	
John Campbell White	Foreign Service officer	Envoy Extraordinary and Minister Plenipotentiary	November 29, 1940	March 14, 1941	Promoted to Ambassador Extraordinary and Plenipotentiary following a joint announcement on March 23, 1943, with seven other Latin American Republics elevating respective legations to embassies.	
John Campbell White	Foreign Service officer	Ambassador Extraordinary and Plenipotentiary	March 27, 1943	April 14, 1943	Left post, February 24, 1944	
Orme Wilson	Foreign Service officer	Ambassador Extraordinary and Plenipotentiary	March 21, 1944	June 2, 1944	Left post, August 22, 1946	
Harold H. Tittmann, Jr.	Foreign Service officer	Ambassador Extraordinary and Plenipotentiary	July 12, 1946	September 20, 1946	Left post, July 17, 1948	
William E. DeCourcy	Foreign Service officer	Ambassador Extraordinary and Plenipotentiary	June 18, 1948	October 13, 1948	Relinquished charge, December 9, 1950	
Howard K. Travers	Foreign Service officer	Ambassador Extraordinary and Plenipotentiary	October 3, 1951	October 30, 1951	Left post, February 25, 1952	
Roy Tasco Davis	Non-career appointee	Ambassador Extraordinary and Plenipotentiary	July 6, 1953	September 23, 1953	Relinquished charge, March 9, 1957	
Gerald A. Drew	Foreign Service officer	Ambassador Extraordinary and Plenipotentiary	April 17, 1957	May 15, 1957	Left post, July 16, 1960	
Robert Newbegin	Foreign Service officer	Ambassador Extraordinary and Plenipotentiary	August 27, 1960	November 4, 1960	Left post, December 10, 1961	
Raymond L. Thurston	Foreign Service officer	Ambassador Extraordinary and Plenipotentiary	December 7, 1961	January 4, 1962	Normal relations interrupted, May 15, 1963; relations not yet resumed when Thurston left post, May 26, 1963	
Benson E.L. Timmons III	Foreign Service officer	Ambassador Extraordinary and Plenipotentiary	November 30, 1963	January 16, 1964	Left post, May 28, 1967	
Claude G. Ross	Foreign Service officer	Ambassador Extraordinary and Plenipotentiary	April 19, 1967	June 20, 1967	Left post, October 17, 1969	
Clinton E. Knox	Foreign Service officer	Ambassador Extraordinary and Plenipotentiary	October 9, 1969	November 13, 1969	Left post, April 26, 1973	
Heyward Isham	Foreign Service officer	Ambassador Extraordinary and Plenipotentiary	December 19, 1973	January 31, 1974	Left post, July 8, 1977	
William B. Jones	Foreign Service officer	Ambassador Extraordinary and Plenipotentiary	August 3, 1977	August 12, 1977	Left post, July 12, 1980	
Henry L. Kimelman	Non-career appointee	Ambassador Extraordinary and Plenipotentiary	August 27, 1980	October 16, 1980	Left post, February 18, 1981	
Ernest H. Preeg	Foreign Service officer	Ambassador Extraordinary and Plenipotentiary	June 20, 1981	July 28, 1981	Left post, August 20, 1983	
Clayton E. McManaway, Jr.	Foreign Service officer	Ambassador Extraordinary and Plenipotentiary	November 18, 1983	January 10, 1984	Left post, August 18, 1986	
Brunson McKinley	Foreign Service officer	Ambassador Extraordinary and Plenipotentiary	September 12, 1986	October 9, 1986	Left post, November 13, 1989	
Alvin P. Adams, Jr.	Foreign Service officer	Ambassador Extraordinary and Plenipotentiary	October 10, 1989	December 8, 1989	Recalled, August 1, 1992	
Leslie M. Alexander		Chargé d'Affaires ad interim		August 1, 1992	July 1993	
Vicki J. Huddleston		Chargé d'Affaires ad interim		July 1993	October 13, 1993	
William Lacy Swing	Foreign Service officer	Ambassador Extraordinary and Plenipotentiary	October 8, 1993	October 13, 1993	Left post, January 5, 1998	
Timothy Michael Carney	Foreign Service officer	Ambassador Extraordinary and Plenipotentiary	November 12, 1997	January 14, 1998	Left post, December 11, 1999	
Brian Dean Curran	Foreign Service officer	Ambassador Extraordinary and Plenipotentiary	December 28, 2000	January 12, 2001	Left post, May 16, 2003	
James B. Foley	Foreign Service officer	Ambassador Extraordinary and Plenipotentiary	May 27, 2003	September 18, 2003	Left post, August 14, 2005	
Janet Ann Sanderson	Foreign Service officer	Ambassador Extraordinary and Plenipotentiary	February 21, 2006	March 17, 2006	March 15, 2008	
Kenneth H. Merten	Foreign Service officer	Ambassador Extraordinary and Plenipotentiary	June 4, 2009	August 24, 2009	July 20, 2012	
Pamela White	Foreign Service officer	Ambassador Extraordinary and Plenipotentiary	April 2, 2012	August 3, 2012	October 6, 2015	
Peter Mulrean	Foreign Service officer	Ambassador Extraordinary and Plenipotentiary	September 19, 2015	October 6, 2015	February 27, 2017	
Brian W. Shukan	Deputy Chief of Mission at the U.S. Embassy Port-au-Prince	Chargé d'Affaires ad interim	February 27, 2017		August 25, 2017	
Robin Diallo	Minister Counselor for Public Affairs at the U.S. Embassy in Baghdad, Iraq	Chargé d'Affaires ad interim	August 25, 2017		February 21, 2018	
Michele J. Sison	Foreign Service officer	Ambassador Extraordinary and Plenipotentiary	November 2, 2017	February 21, 2018	October 9, 2021	
Kenneth H. Merten	Foreign Service officer	Chargé d'Affaires ad interim	October 12, 2021	October 28, 2021	April 16, 2022	
Gregory T. Kendrick	Foreign Service officer	Chargé d'Affaires ad interim	April 20, 2022	April 21, 2022	July 1, 2022	
Eric Stromayer	Foreign Service officer	Chargé d'Affaires ad interim	July 3, 2022		March 26, 2024	
Dennis B. Hankins	Foreign Service officer	Ambassador Extraordinary and Plenipotentiary	March 14, 2024	May 3, 2024	June 11, 2025	
Henry T. Wooster	Foreign Service officer	Chargé d'Affaires ad interim	June 12, 2025		July 29, 2026	

== See also ==
- Haiti – United States relations
- Foreign relations of Haiti
- Ambassadors of the United States
