= Michael A. Kimelman =

American investments manager

Michael Kimelman
- Born: born circa 1971–1972; Tarzana, Los Angeles, California
- Citizenship: American
- Education: Lafayette College; University of Southern California
- Occupations: entrepreneur, trader, author, business coach, financial consultant, motivational speaker
- Website: mikekimelman.com

Michael A. Kimelman is an American entrepreneur, former trader, author, business coach, financial consultant and motivational speaker.

On 9 November 2009, Kimelman was arrested by the FBI on the charges of "conspiracy to commit insider trading" related to the Galleon Group hedge fund fraud organized by Raj Rajaratnam. He stood two-week trial in the United States District Court for the Southern District of New York. During the trial, Kimelman was offered a plea bargain by the U.S. Attorney Preet Bharara but rejected the proposal and was found guilty of "being a part of an insider trading scheme". On 12 October 2011, Kimelman was sentenced to two and a half years and served 21 months at the minimum security Lewisburg Federal Prison in Pennsylvania.

In 2017, Kimelman published the memoir Confessions of a Wall Street Insider, where he revealed a lot of insider details on the Wall Street lifestyle as well as disorganized U.S. Penitentiary System.

== Early life ==
Michael Kimelman was born into a middle-class family and grew up in Tarzana, Los Angeles, California. In 1989, Kimelman entered Lafayette College in Pennsylvania, where he earned a bachelor's degree in 1993. Continuing his studies at the University of Southern California, he received his Doctoral degree (LL.D.) in law in 1997. Kimelman began his career as a mergers and acquisitions lawyer at Sullivan & Cromwell, a white-shoe law firm headquartered in New York City. After being engaged in legal practice for three years, he became disillusioned with corporate law work and changed his career to trading and finance.

== Career ==
After leaving the law firm in 1999, Kimelman launched a successful career as a proprietary trader. He also worked as an analyst and portfolio manager for a number of hedge funds. During the 2008 financial crisis, Kimelman founded Incremental Capital, a hedge fund with peak portfolio assets of $250 million.

=== Conviction and imprisonment for insider trading ===
Kimelman became involved in insider trading network organized by the billionaire and founder of the Galleon Group hedge fund Raj Rajaratnam. In particular, in August 2007 Kimelman allegedly received insider trading tips on the purchase of the 3Com Corporation (now defunct) stock by another trader Zvi Goffer. In 2009, Kimelman was arrested by the FBI and in 2011 he went on two weeks trial on the charges of securities fraud and conspiracy. As a number of sources note, Kimelman was on the edge of the insider trading scheme and less significant actor of the 26-person circle mainly run by Raj Rajaratnam and his Galleon Group hedge fund.

The government prosecutors offered Kimelman a no jail probation plea on condition he pled guilty but Kimelman refused and went on trial, where the jury found him guilty. Kimelman served 21 months out of 30 months imprisonment term and was released in August 2013. During the imprisonment, Kimelman appealed to the United States Court of Appeals for the Second Circuit to vacant his conviction but the court upheld the initial sentence.

Based on the United States Supreme Court's final decision on the U.S. vs. Newman regarding the level of involvement in the insider trading circle, Kimelman and his former partners tried to appeal and have the verdicts overturned but were unsuccessful.

== 2013–present ==
After incarceration, Kimelman started a number of enterprises in the healthcare and cryptocurrency fields. He also works as a business coach and motivational speaker frequently appearing on various events, shows and podcasts to talk about his life experience and the book he wrote.

Kimelman has spoken at the White Collar Support Group, a 501(c)(3) organization which assists former white-collar offenders accept responsibility, make amends, and rebuild their lives.

In 2017, Kimelman and Charlie Shrem formed Crypto.IQ, a strategic advisory and investment firm in the digital asset space. Kimelman is currently the CEO of Dekryption Advisors, an advisory and investment firm with a focus on healthcare and blockchain companies.

=== Writing ===
While still incarcerated, Kimelman began to write a book on the Wall Street lifestyle and the U.S. Criminal Justice System, titled Confessions of a Wall Street Insider: A Cautionary Tale of Rats, Feds, and Banksters. The book was written in form of memoir, where the author shared his views on his past career as a money manager and the institutional bias and incompetence of the U.S. judicial and penitentiary system. In the book, Kimelman especially criticized the US prisons:

"“You hear about the basic fairness of the legal system and then you go through the process and there’s this cognitive dissonance between what you hear your whole life and what you experience. It was an urge, almost a necessity, to put that to paper..."

"From a societal point of view, I learned what an abject disgrace our prison system is (really the entire criminal-justice system). While I get that it's supposed to be punitive, I find it hard to believe that the American public would allow it to exist in its present state if they knew what it was like."

Originally published in March 2017 by Skyhorse Publishing, the book received mostly favorable reviews, ranging from critical acclaim for honest retrospection into personal biography to criticism for not taking responsibility for his own actions.

In June 2022, he co-authored a book entitled Mastering the Basics of Bitcoin and Crypto with co-author Charlie Shrem.

== Works ==
=== Bibliography ===
- Confessions of a Wall Street Insider: A Cautionary Tale of Rats, Feds, and Banksters (Simon and Schuster, 2017) ASIN B01HDVCKHE
- Mastering the Basics of Bitcoin and Crypto (2022), M. Kimelman, C. Shrem, ASIN B0B3JXJV3B

=== Notable publications ===
- Waters-McHenry Bill Aims To Close Insider Trading Loopholes in SEC Rule 10b5–1 (2019)
- US v. Richard Lee: Surprising Revelations, and Another Case Invalidated Due To Lack of a ‘Personal Benefit’ Element
- H.R. 2534 is the Most Significant Expansion and Clarification of Insider Trading Law in Decades

== See also ==
- White-collar crime
