= Gideon Hiram Hollister =

American politician and writer (1817–1881)

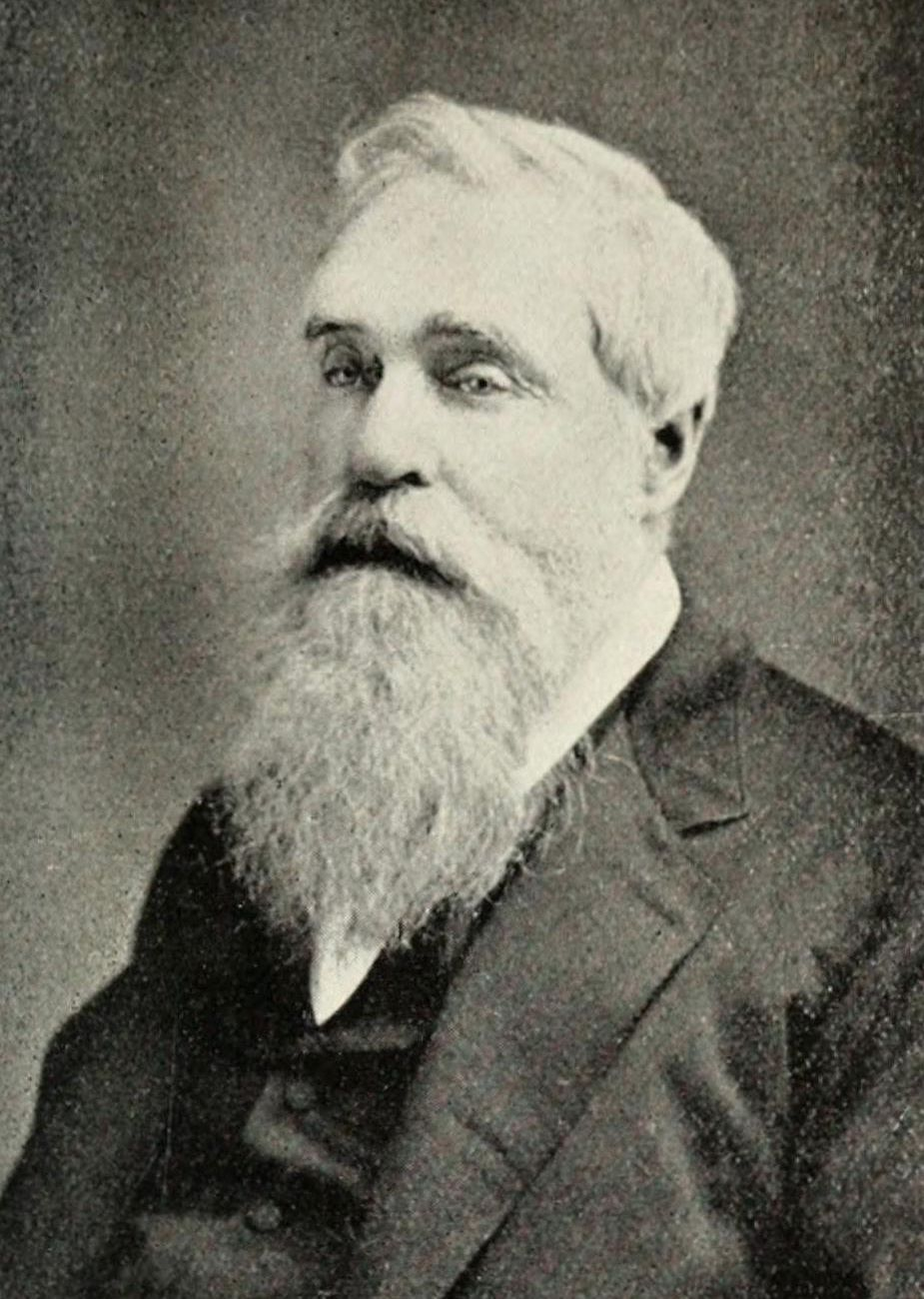
- Portrait of Hollister in a 1909 publication

Member of the Connecticut House of Representatives from the Litchfield County district
- In office 1880–1881

Member of the Connecticut Senate from the 15th district
- In office 1856–1857

Personal details
- Born: December 14, 1817 Washington, Connecticut, U.S.
- Died: March 24, 1881 (aged 63) Litchfield, Connecticut, U.S.
- Party: Republican (until 1869); Democratic
- Spouse: Mary S. Brisbane (m. 1847)
- Children: 1
- Education: Yale University
- Occupation: Politician; diplomat; writer

Gideon Hiram Hollister (December 14, 1817 – March 24, 1881) was an American politician, diplomat, and author from Connecticut. He served in the Connecticut State Senate and Connecticut House of Representatives. He wrote books and poems, including History of Connecticut.

== Early life ==
Gideon Hiram Hollister was born on December 14, 1817, in Washington, Connecticut, to Gideon Hollister. He was educated in Washington Academy. He graduated from Yale College in 1840. He was class poet and was editor of the Yale Literary Magazine. He was first president of the Linonian Society. He studied with Origen S. Seymour in Litchfield and was admitted to the bar in April 1842.

== Career ==
Hollister began practicing law in Woodbury but moved to Litchfield shortly after. In 1843, he was appointed clerk of the courts. He held the role until 1852, except for one year.

In 1855, Hollister ran for the Connecticut's 4th congressional district in the U.S. Congress, but lost to William W. Welch. In 1856, Hollister was elected to the Connecticut State Senate, representing the 15th district. He was associated with James Dixon's campaign for the U.S. senate. In 1857, he ran for probate judge of the Litchfield district, but lost to George Catlin Woodruff.

In 1859, Hollister left Litchfield to practice law in New York City. He subsequently returned to Litchfield. In February 1868, he was appointed Minister of the United States to Hayti by President Andrew Johnson. He was recalled by President Ulysses S. Grant in September 1869. He then left the Republican Party. He returned to Stratford and practiced law in Bridgeport with his brother Y. C. Hollister. He then returned to Litchfield in 1876. He was affiliated with the Democratic Party later in life. In 1880, he represented Litchfield in the Connecticut House of Representatives as a Democrat.

In 1855, Hollister published History of Connecticut in two volumes. In 1851, he published Mount Hope; or Philip, King of the Wampanoags, a historical romance novel. In 1866, he published a volume of poems called Thomas a Becket, a Tragedy. The poem was performed by Edwin Booth. Prior to his death, he was revising History of Connecticut. He wrote a legal treatise on the law of eminent domain.

== Personal life ==
Hollister married Mary S. Brisbane of Charleston, South Carolina, on June 3, 1847. They had four children.

Hollister died of heart disease on March 24, 1881, at his home in Litchfield.
