= Paul Kimelman =

American world record holder (1947–2026)

Paul M. Kimelman (January 25, 1947 – October 12, 2026) was an American man known for the once fastest weight loss ever. A motivational speaker in the 1980s and early 1990s, he held the Guinness World Record for the greatest weight-loss in the shortest amount of time and was featured on the book's cover in 1982. Kimelman traveled the world and spoke about his experience.

== The record ==
A native of the Bronx, Paul moved to Pittsburgh, Pennsylvania, with his mother Olga Kimelman, in the early 1960s. As a 19-year-old, Paul reached his peak weight; more than 520 pounds (235 kg). Starting in 1967, as a New Year's resolution, he decided to start fasting to lose weight because he was tired of being ridiculed. In an interview posted in the Boca Raton News on March 22, 1981, Paul made this statement on the resolution, "I quit eating right there. I fasted for as long as I could, then after that it was just clear soups, grapefruit juice, skim milk, and salads." Paul shed a little over 355 pounds (161 kg) in 7 months, dropping from 487 to 130 pounds (221 to 59 kg). His achievement was recognized by The Guinness Book of World Records. Not only did he hold the record for more than 12 years, he was also on the cover of the book in 1982.

== Death ==
Kimelman died on October 12, 2026, at the age of 79.

== Book ==
- Life in the Fat Lane: The Paul Kimelman Story, with David Wolfson. Fat Lane Publications (1991) ISBN 0-9624540-0-1
