= George Williamson =

George Williamson may refer to:

- George Williamson (footballer, born 1925) (1925–1994), English footballer
- George Williamson (Australian footballer) (1866–1929), Australian rules footballer
- George Hunt Williamson (1926–1986), UFO contactee
- George Henry Williamson (1845–1918), British Member of Parliament for Worcester, 1906
- George H. Williamson (1872–1936), American architect
- George M. Williamson (architect) (1892–1979), American architect
- George Williamson (academic) (1898–1968), professor of English
- George Williamson (diplomat) (1829–1882), US ambassador
- George Williamson (Florida politician) (1938–2010), American politician from Florida
- George Williamson (Georgia politician) (born 1946), American politician from Georgia
- George Williamson (North Carolina politician), American sheriff and politician in North Carolina
- George Williamson (civil servant) director of HMGCC and chief executive designate of Alan Turing Institute
- G. C. Williamson (George Charles Williamson, 1858–1942), British art historian, antiquarian, and author

== See also ==
- George M. Williamson (disambiguation)
