= Donald Harrington =

Donald Harrington, Donald Harington, 'Don Harrington, or Don Harington may refer to:

- Donald J. Harrington (born 1945), former president of St. John's University
- Donald S. Harrington (1914–2005), New York politician and religious leader
- Donald Harington (writer) (1935–2009), American author
- Donald Harrington (diplomat), American ambassador

== See also ==
- Don Harrington Discovery Center in Amarillo, Texas
