= Albert G. Lawrence =

American diplomat and soldier

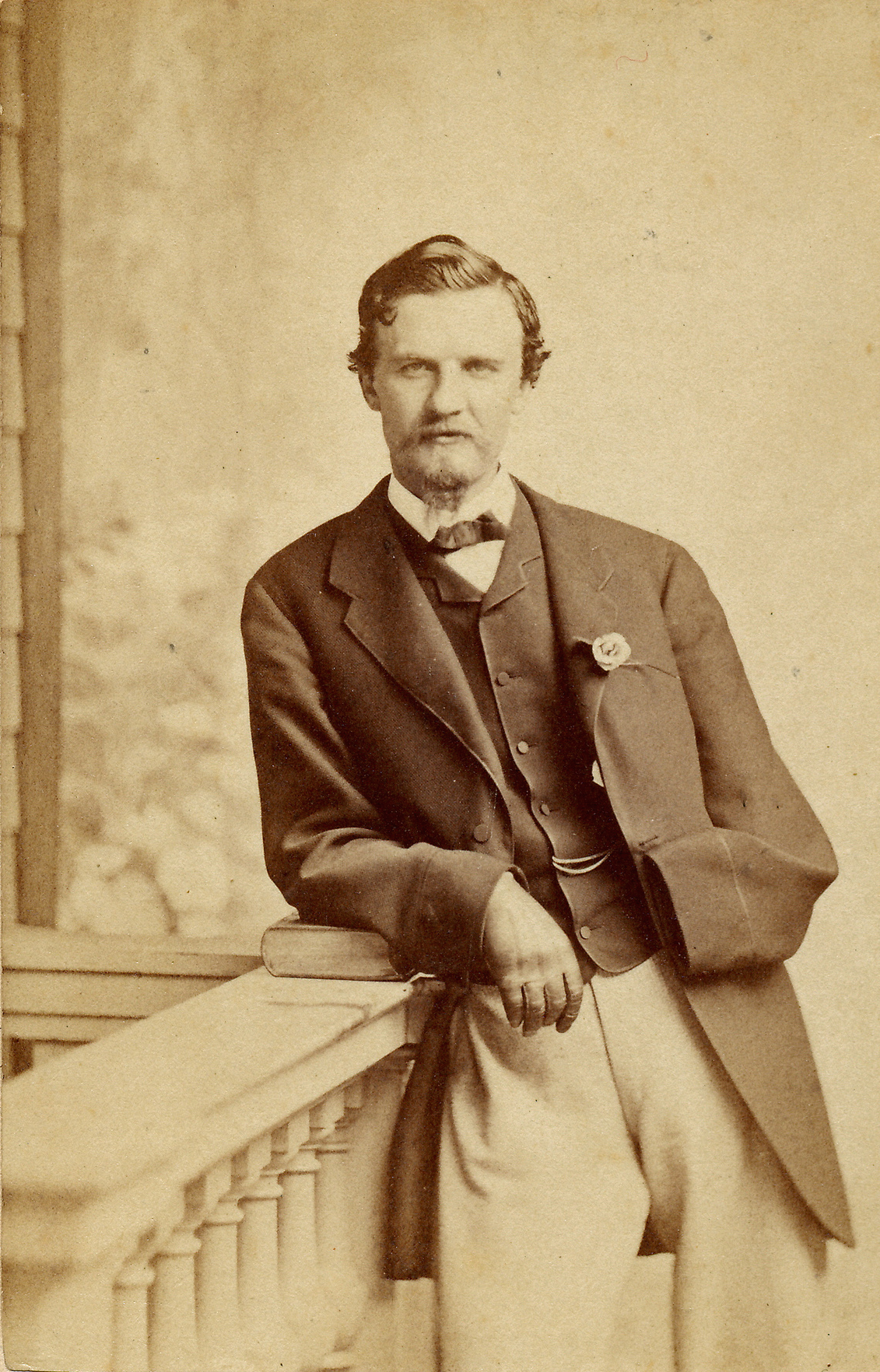
- Gen. Albert Gallatin Lawrence, ca. 1865

United States Minister to Costa Rica
- In office January 18, 1867 – June 24, 1868
- President: Andrew Johnson
- Preceded by: Charles N. Riotte
- Succeeded by: Jacob Beeson Blair

Personal details
- Born: Albert Gallatin Lawrence; April 14, 1836 New York City, New York, U.S.
- Died: January 1, 1887 (aged 50) New York City, New York, U.S.
- Spouse: Eveline McLean Taylor Kingsbury (m. 1865; div. 1879)
- Children: 1
- Parent(s): William Beach Lawrence; Esther Rogers Gracie
- Education: Harvard College; Harvard Law School
- Known for: "Hero of Fort Fisher"

Military service
- Allegiance: United States of America; Union
- Branch/service: United States Army; Union Army
- Years of service: 1861–1865
- Rank: Brevet Brigadier General
- Commands: 2nd United States Colored Cavalry Regiment
- Battles/wars: American Civil War: • 2nd Battle of Fort Fisher

Albert Gallatin Lawrence (April 14, 1836 – January 1, 1887) was an American diplomat and soldier.

== Early life ==
Lawrence was born on April 14, 1836, in New York City. He was the son of Esther Rogers Gracie (1801–1857) and William Beach Lawrence (1800–1881), who served as lieutenant governor, and acting Governor, of Rhode Island.

His siblings included William Lawrence, Isaac Lawrence, Esther Gracie Lawrence, who was married to Dr. W. L. Wheeler and, later, Count Felix von Voss-Giewitz of Mecklenburg-Schwerin, Cornelia Beach Lawrence, who married Baron von Klenck, and James Gracie King Lawrence, who married Catherine Augusta Le Roy.

His paternal grandparents were Isaac Lawrence (1768–1841) and Cornelia Ann (née Beach) Lawrence (1777–1857). His maternal grandparents were Esther (née Rogers) Gracie and Archibald Gracie (1755–1829), a Scottish-born shipping magnate and early American businessman and merchant in New York City.

== Career ==
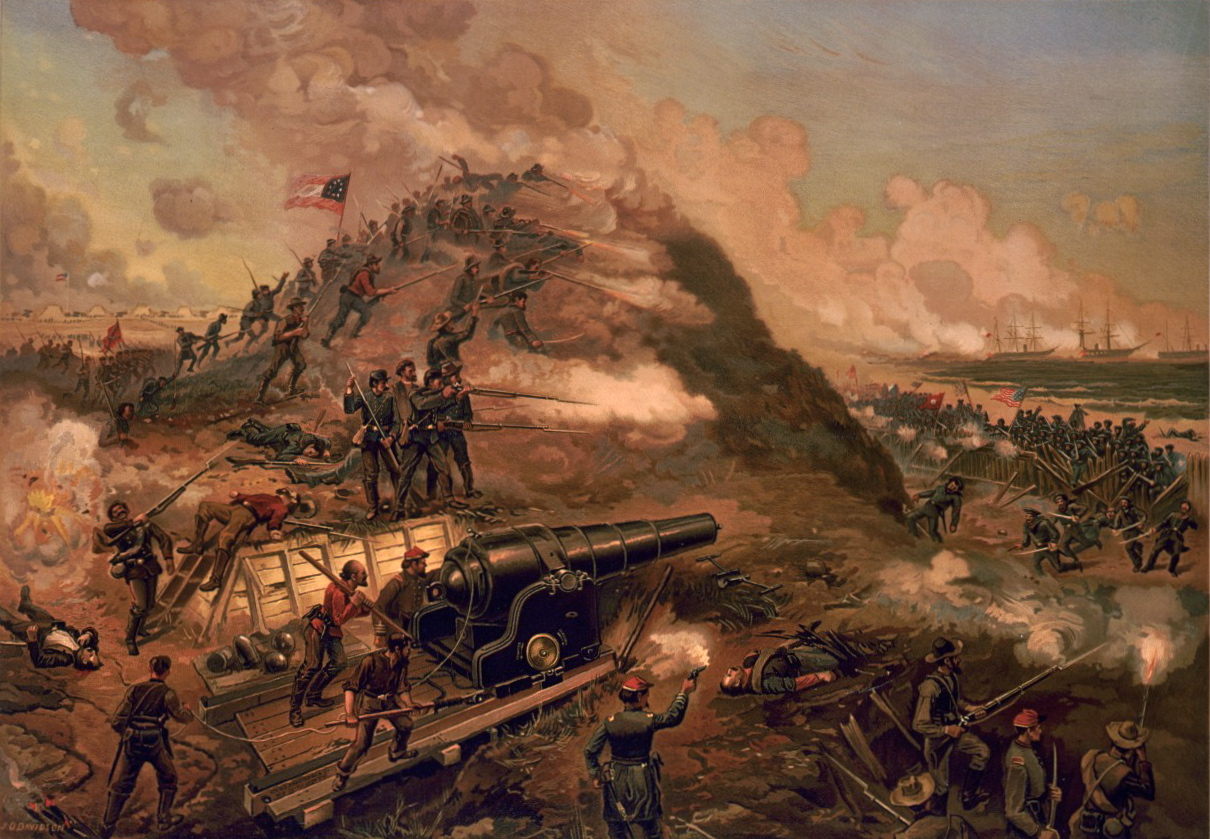
Assault of the fort during the Second Battle of Fort Fisher

He was educated at Harvard College, and studied law at Harvard Law School, receiving his diploma as a lawyer in 1858.

Lawrence, who did not practice law, then served as the attaché for the United States at Vienna after he turned down the position of Secretary of the American Legation at Vienna.

=== Military career ===
At the start of the American Civil War, he returned to serve in the Union Army and was commissioned a captain in the 54th New York Volunteer Infantry. In 1864, he was promoted lieutenant colonel and commanded the 2nd United States Colored Cavalry Regiment in actions through Virginia.

On January 15, 1865, he led the assault on Fort Fisher in Virginia, which captured the Confederate post for the Union. In the battle, he was severely wounded and lost his left arm. For his gallantry in the battle of Fort Fisher, he was brevetted Brigadier-General of the U.S. Volunteers on March 25, 1865. He was called the "Hero of Fort Fisher."

=== Diplomatic service ===
On October 2, 1866, he was appointed by President Andrew Johnson as the United States Minister to Costa Rica. He presented his credentials on January 18, 1867, and served until his recall, around June 24, 1868. During a visit to Washington, he engaged in a duel, fought in Belgium with Hon. Amédée Van den Nest, the former attaché of the Belgian legation, over words exchanged with Lawrence's wife in letters between Van den Nest and Eva. The subsequent sensation caused Van den Nest to lose his position, forced Lawrence to resign his post, and effectively ended the marriage of Albert and Eva. Eva and Van den Nest later married.

In 1880, Lawrence became a Republican and came out in favor of James A. Garfield and Chester Arthur in the presidential race of 1880. In his editorial, The New York Times stated that his endorsement meant that "The Democrats are mortified at the spectacle of a son of the sage of Ochre Point coming out so publicly for Garfield and Arthur."

== Personal life ==
In September 1865, Lawrence was married to Eveline McLean "Eva" (née Taylor) Kingsbury (1845–1917), youngest daughter of Gen. Joseph Pannell Taylor and niece of the 12th U.S. President Zachary Taylor. She was the widow of Capt. Henry Walter Kingsbury of Chicago who was killed at the Battle of Antietam and was heir to the vast estate of Major Kingsbury. Before their public divorce in 1879, they were the parents of:

- Esther Gracie Lawrence (b. 1872)

Lawrence died at the Everett House in New York City on January 1, 1887. After a service at St. Mark's Church on Stuyvesant Street, he was buried at the Lawrence burying grounds in Astoria, Queens. His daughter inherited his estate, which was very small, and a share of her grandfather's estate, which was quite vast.

Political offices
Preceded by Charles N. Riotte	United States Minister to Costa Rica; 1867–1868	Succeeded by Jacob Beeson Blair
