= List of ambassadors of the United States to Costa Rica =

Ambassador of the United States to Costa Rica
- Seal of the United States Department of State

- Flag of a United States ambassador

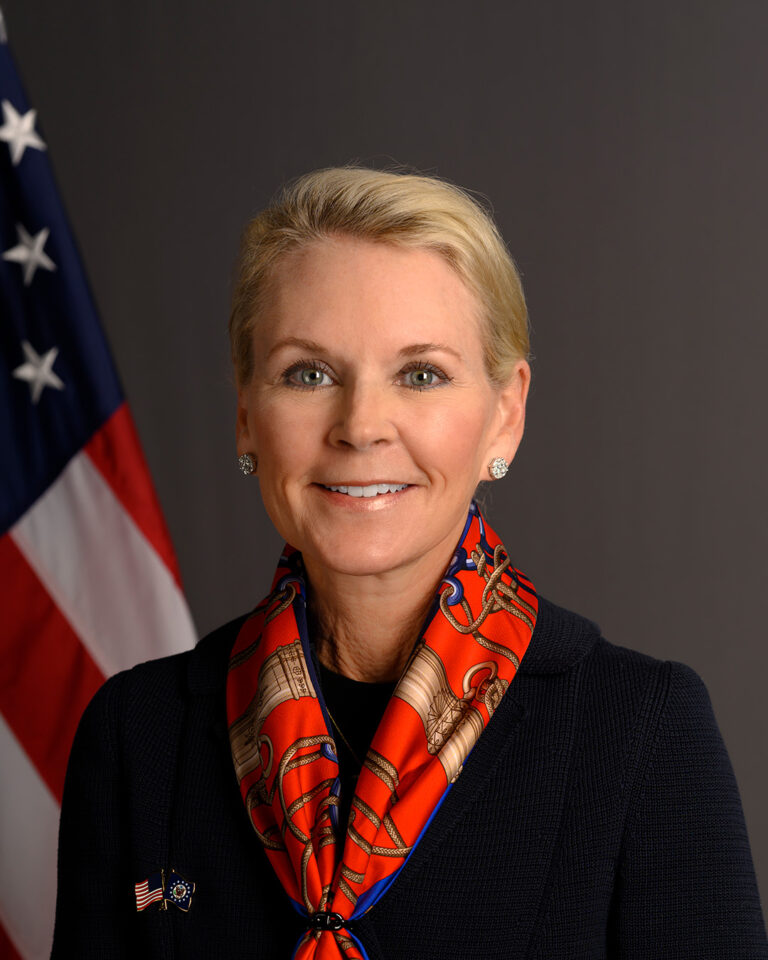
- Incumbent; Melinda Hildebrand since January 8, 2026
- Nominator: The president of the United States
- Appointer: The president with Senate advice and consent
- Inaugural holder: Solon Borland as Envoy Extraordinary and Minister Plenipotentiary
- Website: U.S. Embassy - San Jose

The following is a list of United States ambassadors, or other chiefs of mission, to Costa Rica.

Representative	Title	Presentation of credentials	Termination of mission	Appointed by
Solon Borland	Envoy Extraordinary and Minister Plenipotentiary		April 17, 1854	Franklin Pierce
Mirabeau B. Lamar	Minister Resident	September 14, 1858	May 20, 1859	James Buchanan
Alexander Dimitry	Minister Resident	September 29, 1859	April 27, 1861	James Buchanan
Charles N. Riotte	Minister Resident	August 29, 1861	January 18, 1867	Abraham Lincoln
Albert G. Lawrence	Minister Resident	January 18, 1867	June 24, 1868	Andrew Johnson
Jacob B. Blair	Minister Resident	October 6, 1868	June 30, 1873	Andrew Johnson
George Williamson	Minister Resident	August 13, 1873	January 31, 1879	Ulysses S. Grant
Cornelius A. Logan	Minister Resident	December 25, 1879	April 17, 1882	Rutherford B. Hayes
Henry Cook Hall	Envoy Extraordinary and Minister Plenipotentiary	November 22, 1882	May 16, 1889	Chester A. Arthur
Lansing B. Mizner	Envoy Extraordinary and Minister Plenipotentiary	August 30, 1889	December 31, 1890	Benjamin Harrison
Romualdo Pacheco	Envoy Extraordinary and Minister Plenipotentiary	May 7, 1891	October 31, 1891	Benjamin Harrison
Richard Cutts Shannon	Envoy Extraordinary and Minister Plenipotentiary	October 31, 1891	April 30, 1893	Benjamin Harrison
Lewis Baker	Envoy Extraordinary and Minister Plenipotentiary	May 20, 1893	December 9, 1897	Grover Cleveland
William L. Merry	Envoy Extraordinary and Minister Plenipotentiary	January 15, 1898	March 4, 1911	William McKinley
Lewis Einstein	Envoy Extraordinary and Minister Plenipotentiary	November 3, 1911	December 29, 1911	William H. Taft
Edward J. Hale	Envoy Extraordinary and Minister Plenipotentiary	August 29, 1913	April 19, 1917	Woodrow Wilson
Stewart Johnson	Chargé d'Affaires ad interim	April 19, 1917	December 5, 1918	Woodrow Wilson
John F. Martin, Jr.	Chargé d'Affaires ad interim	October 15, 1920	January 1921	Woodrow Wilson
Walter C. Thurston	Chargé d'Affaires ad interim	January 1921	March 1922	Warren G. Harding
Roy T. Davis	Envoy Extraordinary and Minister Plenipotentiary	March 14, 1922	January 4, 1930	Warren G. Harding
Charles C. Eberhardt	Envoy Extraordinary and Minister Plenipotentiary	March 14, 1930	September 24, 1933	Herbert Hoover
Leo R. Sack	Envoy Extraordinary and Minister Plenipotentiary	October 16, 1933	January 10, 1937	Franklin D. Roosevelt
William H. Hornibrook	Envoy Extraordinary and Minister Plenipotentiary	September 2, 1937	September 1, 1941	Franklin D. Roosevelt
Arthur Bliss Lane	Envoy Extraordinary and Minister Plenipotentiary	October 27, 1941	March 17, 1942	Franklin D. Roosevelt
Robert M. Scotten	Envoy Extraordinary and Minister Plenipotentiary	March 31, 1942	April 20, 1943	Franklin D. Roosevelt
Fay Allen Des Portes	Ambassador Extraordinary and Plenipotentiary	May 20, 1943	September 11, 1944	Franklin D. Roosevelt
Hallett Johnson	Ambassador Extraordinary and Plenipotentiary	February 14, 1945	May 16, 1947	Franklin D. Roosevelt
Walter J. Donnelly	Ambassador Extraordinary and Plenipotentiary	June 27, 1947	October 15, 1947	Harry S. Truman
Nathaniel Penistone Davis	Ambassador Extraordinary and Plenipotentiary	January 31, 1948	June 8, 1949	Harry S. Truman
Joseph Flack	Ambassador Extraordinary and Plenipotentiary	August 13, 1949	September 21, 1950	Harry S. Truman
Philip Bracken Fleming	Ambassador Extraordinary and Plenipotentiary	November 20, 1951	August 7, 1953	Harry S. Truman
Robert C. Hill	Ambassador Extraordinary and Plenipotentiary	November 4, 1953	September 10, 1954	Dwight D. Eisenhower
Robert F. Woodward	Ambassador Extraordinary and Plenipotentiary	December 3, 1954	March 15, 1958	Dwight D. Eisenhower
Whiting Willauer	Ambassador Extraordinary and Plenipotentiary	May 5, 1958	April 17, 1961	Dwight D. Eisenhower
Raymond Telles	Ambassador Extraordinary and Plenipotentiary	May 22, 1961	February 19, 1967	John F. Kennedy
Clarence A. Boonstra	Ambassador Extraordinary and Plenipotentiary	March 8, 1967	August 11, 1969	Lyndon B. Johnson
Walter C. Ploeser	Ambassador Extraordinary and Plenipotentiary	April 27, 1970	April 13, 1972	Richard Nixon
Viron P. Vaky	Ambassador Extraordinary and Plenipotentiary	October 17, 1972	February 9, 1974	Richard Nixon
Terence A. Todman	Ambassador Extraordinary and Plenipotentiary	March 17, 1975	January 24, 1977	Gerald Ford
Marvin Weissman	Ambassador Extraordinary and Plenipotentiary	June 28, 1977	March 22, 1980	Jimmy Carter
Francis J. McNeil	Ambassador Extraordinary and Plenipotentiary	July 8, 1980	June 27, 1983	Jimmy Carter
Curtin Winsor, Jr.	Ambassador Extraordinary and Plenipotentiary	July 14, 1983	February 18, 1985	Ronald Reagan
Lewis Arthur Tambs	Ambassador Extraordinary and Plenipotentiary	August 1, 1985	January 1, 1987	Ronald Reagan
Deane Roesch Hinton	Ambassador Extraordinary and Plenipotentiary	November 17, 1987	January 4, 1990	Ronald Reagan
Luis Guinot, Jr.	Ambassador Extraordinary and Plenipotentiary	August 27, 1991	March 1, 1993	George H. W. Bush
Robert O. Homme	Chargé d'Affaires ad interim	March 1, 1993	July 1993	Bill Clinton
Donald Harrington	Chargé d'Affaires ad interim	July 1993	August 1993	Bill Clinton
Joseph Becelia	Chargé d'Affaires ad interim	August 1993	October 21, 1994	Bill Clinton
Peter Jon de Vos	Ambassador Extraordinary and Plenipotentiary	October 21, 1994	October 14, 1997	Bill Clinton
Thomas J. Dodd, Jr.	Ambassador Extraordinary and Plenipotentiary	November 26, 1997	March 1, 2001	Bill Clinton
John J. Danilovich	Ambassador Extraordinary and Plenipotentiary	October 10, 2001	June 1, 2004	George W. Bush
Mark Langdale	Ambassador Extraordinary and Plenipotentiary	November 8, 2005	July 31, 2007	George W. Bush
Peter M. Brennan	Chargé d'Affaires ad interim	August 1, 2007	May 5, 2008	George W. Bush
Peter Cianchette	Ambassador Extraordinary and Plenipotentiary	May 5, 2008	June 19, 2009	George W. Bush
Anne S. Andrew	Ambassador Extraordinary and Plenipotentiary	January 12, 2010	June 12, 2013	Barack Obama
S. Fitzgerald Haney	Ambassador Extraordinary and Plenipotentiary	July 8, 2015	July 15, 2017	Barack Obama
Sharon Day	Ambassador Extraordinary and Plenipotentiary	September 25, 2017	January 20, 2021	Donald Trump
Cynthia Telles	Ambassador Extraordinary and Plenipotentiary	March 11, 2022	January 20, 2025	Joe Biden
Mike Flores	Chargé d'Affaires ad interim	January 20, 2025	August 1, 2025	Donald Trump
Jennifer Savage	Chargé d'Affaires ad interim	August 5, 2025	January 5, 2026	Donald Trump
Melinda Hildebrand	Ambassador Extraordinary and Plenipotentiary	January 8, 2026	Incumbent	Donald Trump

== See also ==
- Costa Rica – United States relations
- Foreign relations of Costa Rica
- Ambassadors of the United States
