= Chicola (surname) =

Chicola is a surname. Notable people with the surname include:

- Claúdio Chicola (born 1999), Angolan handball player
- Philip T. Chicola (born 1946), American diplomat
