= Stewart Johnson =

Stewart Johnson may refer to:

- Stewart Johnson (diplomat), American diplomat
- Stew Johnson, basketball player
- Staz Johnson (Stewart Johnson), English comic book artist and penciller
