= John J. Danilovich =

American business executive (born 1950)

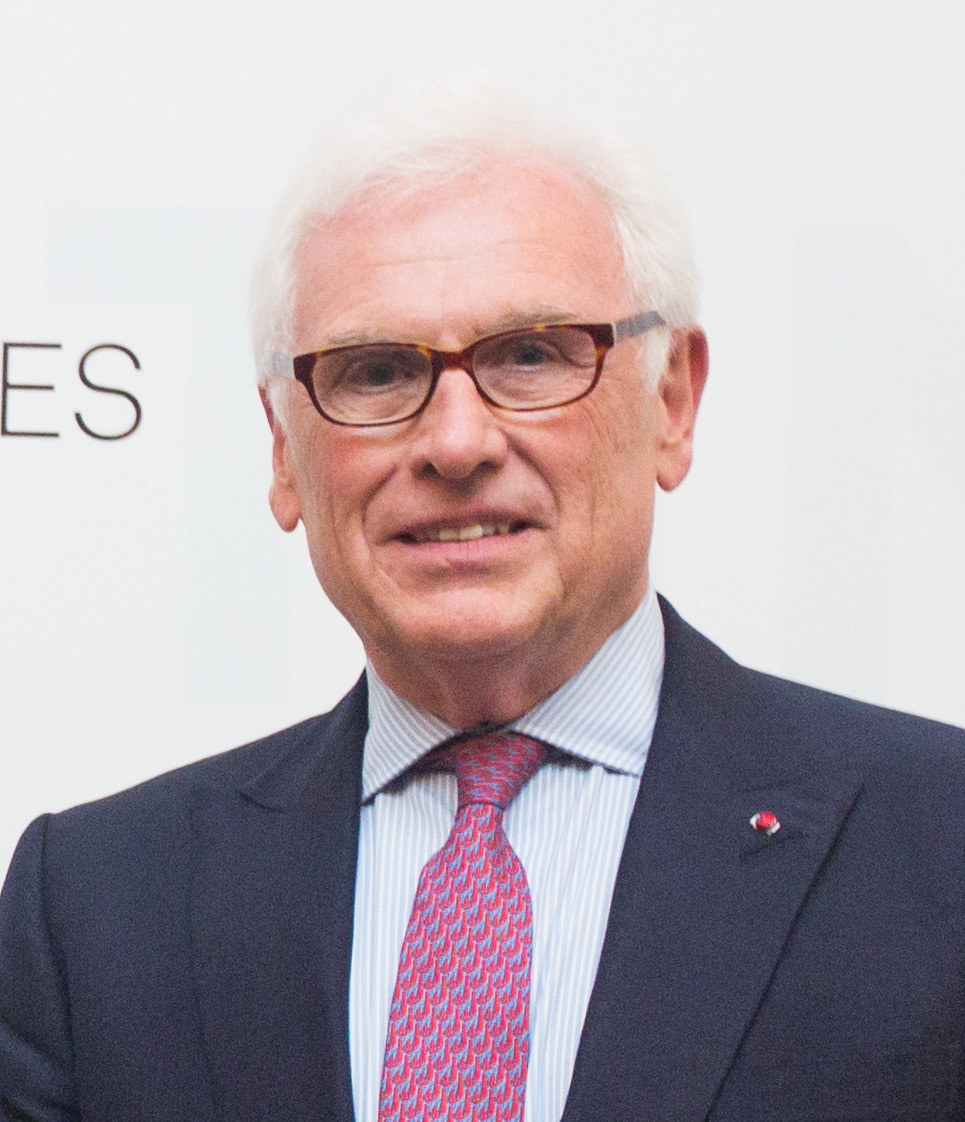
Danilovich in December 2017

John Joseph Danilovich (born 25 June 1950) is an American business executive who was secretary general of the International Chamber of Commerce from 2014 – 2018. He previously held roles as a senior United States government executive, diplomat, and ambassador.

Danilovich was the chief executive officer of the Millennium Challenge Corporation (MCC) from 2005 to 2009. Prior to his appointment as CEO of the MCC by President George W. Bush, Danilovich served as the United States Ambassador to Brazil (2004-2005), United States Ambassador to Costa Rica (2001-2004), and was on the board of directors of the Panama Canal Commission (1991-1996), chairing the Commission's Transition Committee prior to the transfer of the Canal to the Panamanians. Danilovich was active in the international maritime industry for several decades, as a member of the executive management board of Atlas Interocean Shipping Group (1977-1990) and consultant with the Eisenhower Group (1987-1990).

Danilovich is a director of d'Amico International Shipping and member of the Audit (Control and Risk) Committee and the Nomination & Remuneration Committee, a member of the European Advisory Council of Trilantic Capital Partners LLP, and a Director of Airtel Africa PLC (UK/FTSE). Danilovich is also a member of the International Council of the Museum of Modern Art, New York (MoMA) and of The Council of the Serpentine Gallery (London).

== Background ==
Danilovich is a native Californian and resident of London. Danilovich attended The Choate School in Wallingford, Connecticut (1968) and received a BA in political science from Stanford University (1972), having made the Dean's List of Honor Students. He received an MA in international relations from the University of Southern California (London) in 1981. Danilovich and his English-born wife The Hon. Irene Forte, daughter of the late Lord Forte, have three children.

== Government service ==
=== United States Ambassador to Costa Rica (2001 – 2004) ===
Danilovich served as U.S. Ambassador to Costa Rica between 2001 and 2004, where one of his main priorities was "to work diligently to advance U.S. investment and commercial interests…and enhance U.S.-Costa Rican relations." Danilovich also focused on partnerships to increase collaboration on drug interdiction, environmental protection, and human rights. As Ambassador, Danilovich led and concluded Central American Free Trade Agreement negotiations, working closely with then U.S. Trade Representative Robert Zoellick.

=== United States Ambassador to Brazil (2004 – 2005) ===
Following his term as U.S. Ambassador to Costa Rica, Danilovich was appointed as U.S. Ambassador to Brazil on May 26, 2004 and presented his credentials to Brazilian President Lula da Silva in a ceremony at the Planalto Palace shortly thereafter. As Chief of the largest diplomatic mission in South America, Danilovich managed relations with Brazilian Federal, State and local leaders on a range of issues such as trade, energy, and commercial developments. Danilovich advocated on behalf of major U.S. Fortune 500 corporations with activities in Brazil. During his time as Ambassador, U.S. exports to Brazil grew by over $4.1 billion from the end of 2003 to 2005.

=== Millennium Challenge Corporation (2005 – 2009) ===
Created by the U.S. Congress in January 2004 following President George W. Bush's call for "development defined by greater accountability for rich and poor nation alike", the MCC is an innovative and independent U.S. foreign aid agency with a focused mandate to reduce poverty through programs that sustain economic growth and development. The MCC is based on three key principles: 1) Competitive selection based on a country's performance on independent and transparent policy indicators; 2) Country-led solutions as the selected countries identify and select their priorities for economic growth and poverty reduction programs based on broad consultation within their society; and 3) Country-led implementation with countries managing and overseeing the program implementation with rigorous and transparent monitoring of funds by the MCC.

On August 11, 2005, President George W. Bush announced his intention to nominate John J. Danilovich to be the second Chief Executive Officer of the MCC following an initial period of what many considered to be a slow and rocky start for the corporation. The Wall Street Journal opined that the "effort is in trouble. Mr. Bush has sought far less funding for his Millennium Challenge Corp. than he initially promised to request from Congress; lawmakers have given even less money than he has requested; the agency has awarded grants to just five countries, and critics say those it has given are too small to alter the fortunes of the recipients. This means that John Danilovich, the former oil shipping executive and Republican activist who took over the agency this week, figures he has less than nine months to restore its reputation – and, in the view of its supporters, save it from becoming a footnote in America's efforts to fight poverty overseas."

In his confirmation hearing before the Senate Foreign Relations Committee, Danilovich committed himself to improving MCC operations and focus on a more strategic vision in order "to be transformative, to stay targeted, and to deliver results." Senate Foreign Relations Committee Chairman Richard Lugar lauded Danilovich's "deep understanding of the international economy…an important asset to the MCC, as it moves into its next phase of development." Danilovich was subsequently confirmed, unanimously, by the U.S. Senate on October 7, 2005. At Danilovich's swearing in ceremony, President George W. Bush stated that "The MCC is an integral part of our strategy to fight poverty and to encourage economic development. And leading this organization requires a combination of idealism and managerial skill and diplomatic savvy and economic expertise. John Danilovich has those qualities -- that's why I picked him and that's why he's going to be a great executive leading this important corporation."

As CEO of the MCC, Danilovich was responsible for the operation of partnerships in 40 countries worldwide with a $7.3 billion investment portfolio. Danilovich also directed and advised a nine-member Board of Directors chaired by the secretary of State and including the United States Secretary of Treasury, U.S. Trade Representative, USAID Administrator, and high-profile citizens named by the United States Congress. For a country to be selected as eligible for an MCC assistance program, it must demonstrate a commitment to just and democratic governance, investments in its people, and economic freedom as measured by different policy indicators. During his time as CEO, multi-year economic growth and poverty reduction programs with 18 countries – ranging from large-scale infrastructure to microfinance to public sector reform – were approved by Congress and implemented in sub-Saharan Africa, Latin America, and Eurasia. These programs had significant positive impact on the lives of millions throughout the world by reducing poverty through sustainable economic growth. Liberian President Ellen Johnson Sirleaf added her praise, proclaiming that the "MCC has had a transformative effect across the developing world." Danilovich insisted that gender equality be a critical component of MCC compacts and was awarded the Partnership for Women to Thrive Award which noted that: "Ambassador Danilovich has led the MCC to adopt an unprecedented gender policy, which integrates both women's and men's needs into the MCC's work."

At the end of his tenure, Danilovich was widely credited for transforming the new initiative into a successful and acknowledged institution, bringing strategic vision, and forging alliances with new partners, which received bi-partisan praise from senior government, business and development experts. At her 2009 Senate Foreign Relations confirmation hearing for United States Secretary of State, Hillary Clinton articulated the Administration's policy in building upon Danilovich's work, informing the Committee that "President-Elect Obama supports the MCC, and the principle of greater accountability in our foreign assistance programs. It represents a worthy new approach to poverty reduction and combating corruption." White House Chief of Staff Jacob Lew in his confirmation hearing to be Deputy Secretary of State for Management and Resources declared that MCC was "making real progress", while nominee for Deputy Secretary of State James Steinberg told the Committee that "I think one of the lessons we've learned, with Millennium Challenge Corporation and others, is that there are great partnerships to be had out there, that not only lead to more successful programs on the ground, but also create substantial goodwill for the United States."

The Heritage Foundation, known for its staunch criticism of foreign aid, stated that under Danilovich's leadership, "The MCA is revolutionizing U.S. economic assistance policies. By demanding that a country show its commitment to freedom and economic development, the MCA has greatly improved the likelihood that its aid is not squandered on wasteful and unproductive projects. By placing emphasis on good governance and democratic norms, the MCA has lessened the potential for U.S. foreign aid to be used to prop up authoritarian regimes and increased the likelihood it will go to programs that help people on the ground." Fox National Security Analyst "KT" McFarland called MCC "Phenomenally successful… a great success story." A letter signed by renowned business leaders sent to all U.S. Senators following Danilovich's term as CEO praised the organization for what it had accomplished in such a short period: "The MCA, which began as a presidential initiative, is now recognized by many experts as the most forward-thinking and innovative development program in our foreign assistance portfolio."

== Non-profit organizations ==
=== International Chamber of Commerce (2014 – 2018) ===
On June 30, 2014, Danilovich became Secretary General of the International Chamber of Commerce, administering its affairs and implementing its policy, including managing its finances. At the ICC he was responsible for relations with international governmental and non-governmental organizations such as the B20 and G20 related to issues such as trade reform. Danilovich stepped down as Secretary General in April of 2018 and was succeeded by John W.H. Denton AO.

== Memberships and Honors ==
Danilovich serves as a board member for a number of private and public organizations, including the International Advisory Council for the Harvard School of Public Health, senior advisor at the Center for Strategic and International Studies, Board of Trustees for the Phelps-Stokes Foundation, and as an executive committee member of The Pilgrims. Danilovich has been a Director of the Stanford University Trust, a Trustee of the American Museum in Britain, Director of the U.S.-U.K. Fulbright Commission, and has served in leadership positions for several charitable organizations.

Danilovich is also a life member of the Council on Foreign Relations (NYC), serves on the North American Advisory Council of Chatham House (UK), is a member of the American Academy of Diplomacy, a Knight of Malta, and the recipient of several national and international awards including the Choate Alumni Seal Prize, Companion of the Order of Volta (Ghana), and Grand Cordon du Ouissan Alaouite (Kingdom of Morocco). He is the only American ambassador to be decorated by the Government of Costa Rica with their highest diplomatic honor, the Orden Nacional Juan Mora Fernandez.

Diplomatic posts
Preceded by Thomas J. Dodd, Jr.	United States Ambassador to Costa Rica; 2001–2004	Succeeded by Mark Langdale
Preceded by Donna J. Hrinak	United States Ambassador to Brazil; 2004–2005	Succeeded by Philip T. Chicola
