= Jeffery Hildebrand =

American billionaire businessman (born 1959)

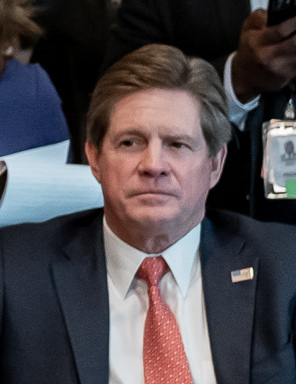
- Hildebrand at the White House, April 2020
- Born: 1959 (age 66–67); Texas, U.S.
- Education: University of Texas at Austin (BS, MS)
- Occupations: Founder; chairman; former CEO
- Spouse: Melinda Hildebrand
- Children: 3

Jeffery Hildebrand (born 1959) is an American billionaire businessman. He is the founder, chairman, and former chief executive officer (CEO) of Hilcorp Energy Company from 1989 until 2018.

== Education ==
Jeffery Hildebrand was born in Texas in 1959 and his father was a veterinarian. He received a bachelor's degree in geology from the University of Texas at Austin in 1981. After working briefly at Exxon as a geologist, he obtained a master's degree in petroleum engineering in 1985 also at UTA. He also is a distinguished engineering graduate of the University of Texas at Austin's Cockrell School of Engineering.

== Career ==
=== Hilcorp ===
Hildebrand worked for American Energy Capital Corporation, the Dan A. Hughes Company, and Exxon Company, until he started Hilcorp Energy Company, an oil and gas exploration and production company. He co-founded Hilcorp in 1990 and later bought out his partner for $500 million in 2003. The company has been ranked on Fortune's 100 Best Companies to Work For list in 2013, 2014, and 2015. In December 2015, his company gave all 1,380 employees a $100,000 Christmas bonus. Hilcorp has the highest greenhouse gas emissions of any U.S. oil and gas company.

The company specializes in buying old, low-producing stripper wells. Hildebrand's success has been attributed to his ability to recognize other companies’ underperforming assets and re-managing them. Stripper wells contribute 6% of United States oil and natural gas production, but are responsible for nearly half of methane emissions in the oil and gas sector.

In February 2018, Hildebrand stepped down as CEO of Hilcorp, passing the position to Greg Lalicker. After the Joe Biden administration announced plans to crack down on methane pollution, Hildebrand became one of biggest donors in the oil industry to the Trump 2024 presidential campaign. After taking office in 2025, President Donald Trump placed a Hilcorp lobbyist in a senior position in the Environmental Protection Agency where they oversaw an effort to undo the methane regulations.

=== Membership ===
Hildebrand is a member of the All American Wildcatters, the National Petroleum Council, the Engineering Advisory Board at University of Texas at Austin, the Independent Petroleum Association of America, the Houston Energy Finance Group, the American Association of Petroleum Geologists, the Society of Petroleum Engineers, the Houston Geological Society, the Texas Independent Petroleum Royalty Owners Association, and the Louisiana Independent Oil and Gas Association.

In April 2020, Governor Greg Abbott named Hildebrand to the Strike Force to Open Texas – a group "tasked with finding safe and effective ways to slowly reopen the state" amid the COVID-19 pandemic. In August 2023, Abbott appointed Hildebrand as Chair of the Texas Parks and Wildlife Department Commission, effective August 31, 2023.

== Philanthropy and political contributions ==
Hildebrand has made charitable contributions to the Houston Zoo and the Contemporary Arts Museum Houston. He was a major donor to Texas A&M University's Hildebrand Equine Complex. In November 2017, he donated $25 million to the Department of Petroleum and Geosystems Engineering at the University of Texas at Austin. In recognition, the university plans to name the department the Hildebrand Department of Petroleum and Geosystems Engineering.

Hildebrand donated $50,000 to Governor Rick Perry during the 2010 Texas gubernatorial election. Hildebrand and his wife, Melissa, contributed $1.2 million to Donald Trump's 2020 presidential campaign. A devout Catholic, Jeffery has contributed millions of dollars to various Christian organizations, charities, and ministries.

== Personal life ==
Jeffery Hildebrand and Melinda "Mindy" Hildebrand are married and have three children. He and his wife are Catholics and the family lives in Houston. In 2025, President Trump nominated Melinda to be U.S. ambassador to Costa Rica.

According to Forbes, Jeffery Hildebrand is worth $10.2 billion as of July 2023. He is the 77th richest American citizen. He was worth $1.9 billion in 2010. He plays polo.
