= George M. Williamson =

George M. Williamson may refer to:

- George Williamson (diplomat) (1829-1882), the American diplomat George McWillie Williamson
- George M. Williamson (architect) (1892–1979), American architect

== See also ==
- George Williamson (disambiguation)
