= Peter Jon de Vos =

American diplomat

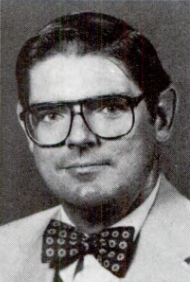
Peter Jon de Vos

Peter Jon de Vos (December 24, 1938 – June 9, 2008) was an American ambassador to Costa Rica, Guinea-Bissau, Liberia, Mozambique and Tanzania.

Diplomatic posts
Preceded by Edward Marks	United States Ambassador to Guinea-Bissau; 1980–1983	Succeeded by Wesley Egan
Preceded by none	United States Ambassador to Mozambique; 1983–1987	Succeeded by Melissa Foelsch Wells
Preceded by Edmund DeJarnette Jr.	United States Ambassador to Tanzania; 1992–1994	Succeeded by J. Brady Anderson
Preceded by Joseph Becelia (as Chargé d'Affaires ad interim)	United States Ambassador to Costa Rica; 1994–1997	Succeeded by Thomas J. Dodd Jr.
