= Richard C. Brown =

Richard C. Brown (March 1, 1939 – August 23, 2004) served as the United States Ambassador to Uruguay under George H. W. Bush, from 1990 to 1993.

== Biography ==
Richard C. Brown was born November 1, 1939, in Tulsa, Oklahoma. He received a B.S. in 1960 and an M.S. in 1961, both from George Washington University.

=== Diplomatic career ===
In 1963, he joined the United States Foreign Service. As a career diplomat, he served in Cuba, Barcelona, Rio de Janeiro, Recife, Port Louis, Montevideo, etc. He also served on the United States National Security Council for Latin American Affairs from 1978 to 1981, Deputy Assistant Secretary for Inter-American Affairs from 1988 to 1990, and Special Adviser for International Security Affairs shortly before his ambassadorship.

==== United States Ambassador to Uruguay; later appointments ====
From 1990 to 1993, he served as the United States Ambassador to Uruguay. He later served as senior coordinator for the Summit of the Americas, and senior area advisor for the Western Hemisphere at the United Nations General Assembly. He was the executive secretary of the Accountability Review Board regarding the bombings of United States embassies in Nairobi and Dar es Salaam in 1998.

Diplomatic posts
Preceded by Malcolm Richard Wilkey	United States Ambassador to Uruguay; 1990–1993	Succeeded by Thomas J. Dodd, Jr.
