= Stewart Johnson (diplomat) =

American diplomat (1880–1926)

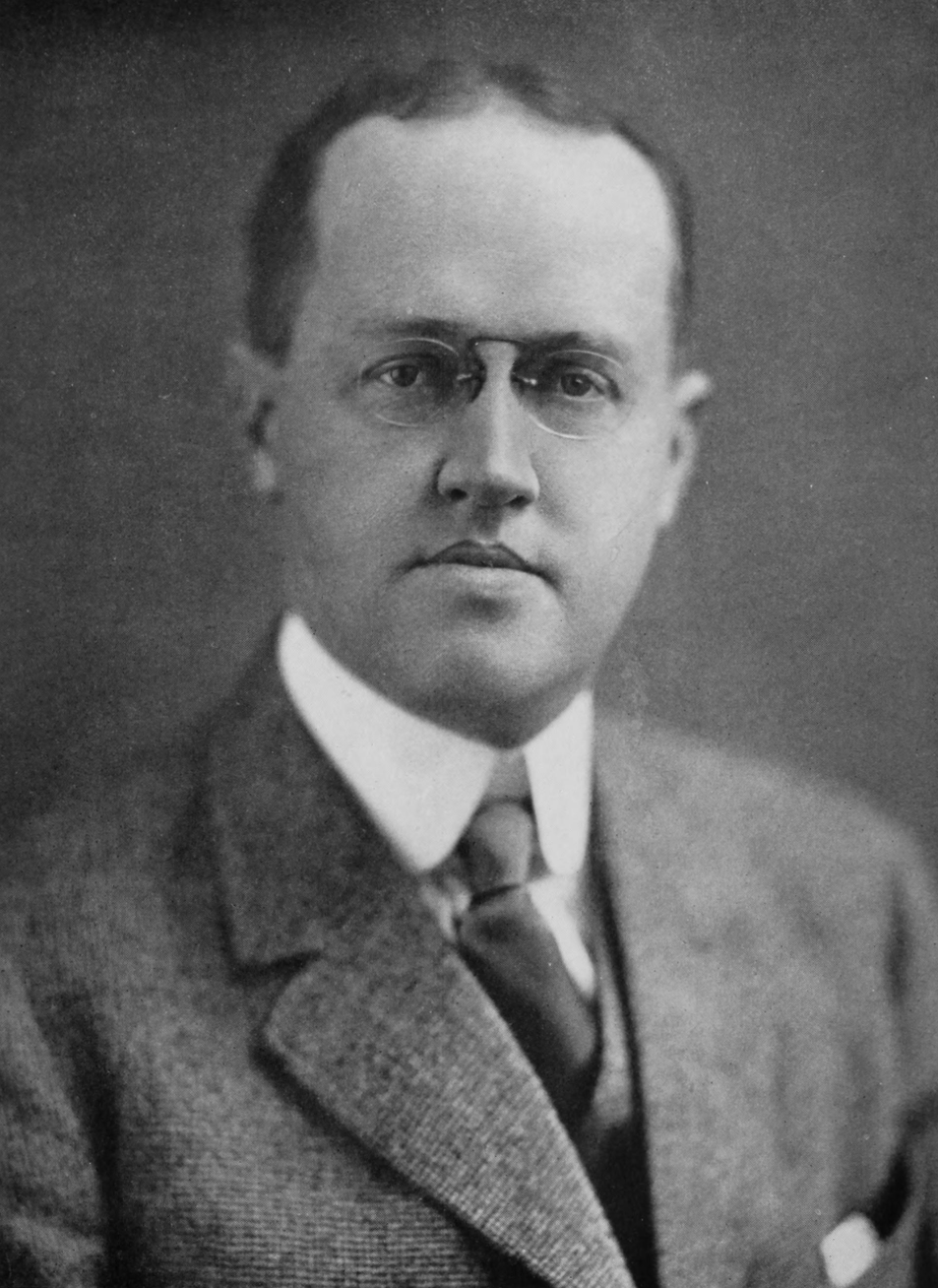
- Born: December 10, 1880; St. Louis, Missouri, US
- Died: September 10, 1926 (aged 45); Alexandria, Egypt
- Burial place: Graceland Cemetery
- Education: Yale University; Harvard Law School
- Occupations: Diplomat, lawyer
- Spouse: Catherine ReQua (m. 1917)

Stewart Johnson (1880–1926) was an American diplomat who served as the States Secretary of Legation in Costa Rica.

== Biography ==
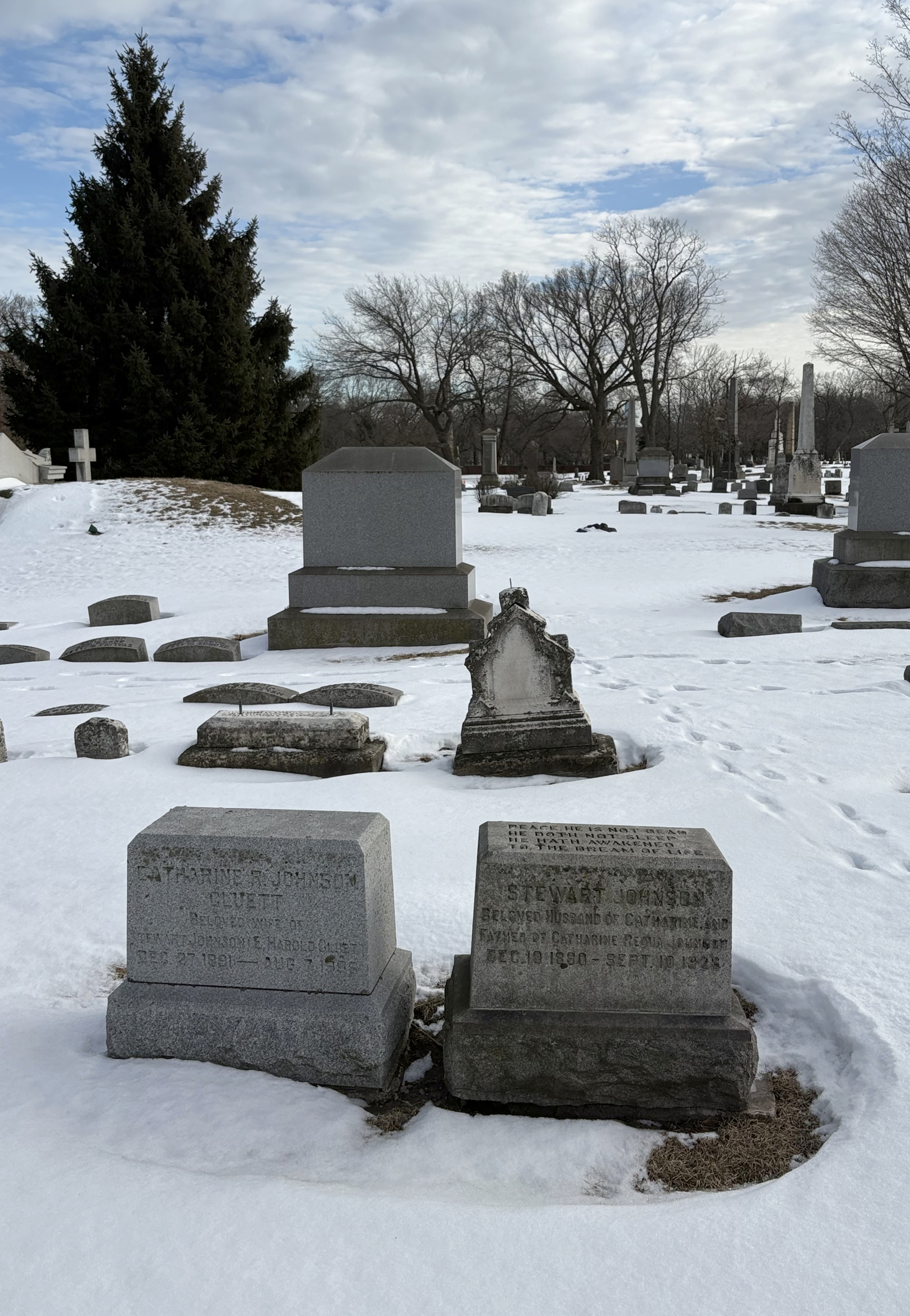
Johnson's grave at Graceland Cemetery

Stewart Johnson was born in St. Louis, Missouri on December 10, 1880.

He graduated from Yale University in 1902 and Harvard Law School in 1907.

After Edward J. Hale was recalled in 1917, Johnson handled the department of Minister of Foreign Affairs of Costa Rica. Johnson married Miss Catherine ReQua on November 17, 1917.

He died in an automobile accident in Alexandria, Egypt on September 10, 1926, and was buried at Graceland Cemetery in Chicago.
