= Fay Allen Des Portes =

American diplomat (1890–1944)

Fay Allen Des Portes (June 16, 1890 – September 17, 1944) was an American ambassador to Bolivia, Costa Rica and Guatemala.

== Biography ==
His parents were Sarah Wolfe (born 1865) and Ulysse Ganvier Des Portes. His brother was Ulysse Ganvier (Jack).

From 1926 to 1928 Des Portes served as deputy in the Parliament of South Carolina. From 1928 to 1936 he sat in the Senate of South Carolina.

On August 19, 1933 Des Portes was sent to Bolivia as an Ambassador by Franklin D. Roosevelt. On November 15, 1933, he handed over his letters of accreditation to the government of Daniel Salamanca Urey. His appointment was initially not confirmed by the Senate. The new commission happened after the approval by the Senate on January 15, 1934. From 1932 to 1935 Bolivia was involved in the Chaco War. On May 1, 1936 he left the post of Ambassador in La Paz.

On April 25, 1936, he became Ambassador to Guatemala. On May 22, 1936, he wrote a letter of accreditation to the government of Jorge Ubico Castañeda. His superior in the State Department was John Moors Cabot. Des Portes worked with TACA Airlines. TACA was at that time the American Shipping Company American Export (Am Ex). On May 14, 1943, he left the ambassadorial post in Guatemala city.

On March 27, 1943 he was sent as ambassador to Costa Rica during the Roosevelt administration. On May 20, 1943, he wrote a letter of accreditation to the government of Rafael Ángel Calderón Guardia. He spoke in Costa Rica about confidential issues. On August 4, 1943, President Calderón gave a list of 33 people of German and Italian origin who the embassy assessed as dangerous, and requested their deportation to the United States. As of September 13, 1943, the deportation of three people had been agreed. Of the other enemy aliens, the government claimed that they were not dangerous. The deportation of Herbert Knöhr with Karl Bayer, who led the 66 members of the NSDAP/AO in Costa Rica, as well as Ricardo Stein Worth and other Nazis of Costa Rica were rejected. The government of Costa Rica argued that both would be held under house arrest and could therefore represent no more danger.

Diplomatic posts
Preceded by post created	United States Ambassador to Costa Rica; 1943 – 1944	Succeeded by Hallett Johnson
