= J. Abdo Debbas =

J. Abdo Debbas was a Greek Orthodox Lebanese who served as American vice-consul at Tarsus in the south of what is now Turkey. In 1870, he presented a Roman marble sarcophagus with garlands to the Metropolitan Museum of Art which was the first item accepted by the museum.

== Early life ==
J. Abdo Debbas was a Greek Orthodox Christian who hailed from a prominent Beiruti family. He was educated partly in Malta at a Christian school that aimed to teach young men to return to their own communities to preach the gospel. Debbas does not appear to have taken up the calling.

== Career ==
In 1863, Debbas was a consular agent in Adana reporting to the U.S. government on exports from the region. By 1867 he was a vice-consul at Tarsus where he assisted American visitors and continued to supply trade statistics. He worked for the U.S. Department of State until 1882.

== A marble sarcophagus ==
In January 1870, Debbas wrote to J. Augustus Johnston, the American consul in Beirut, to offer to the U.S. government a Roman marble sarcophagus with garlands that he had found in 1863. Johnston replied that the government could not accept such a gift and the item was instead agreed to be presented to an American institution recommended by Johnston. After meeting John Taylor Johnston and other founders of the Metropolitan Museum of Art, it was agreed that the item should be received by them. Transit to the coast at Mersin was arranged by Debbas using a team of sixteen buffalo to pull the sarcophagus on a wagon. It then travelled by sea on the USS Shenandoah and the USS Richmond, arriving at the museum in late 1870 where it was the first item accepted. In 1876, the trustees of the museum awarded Debbas a Fellowship in Perpetuity to the museum in gratitude for his gift.

== Debbas family ==
Later, John Debbas was American vice-consul at Mersin.

Debbas had a brother, Khalil (1823-1885), who settled in Beirut, Lebanon. Khalil's grandson Charles Debbas was President of Lebanon from 1926 to 1934.

He was a 3rd great-grandchild of Yaacoub Debbas, born in Damascus in 1655, who was the brother of Patriarch Athanasius III Dabbas.
