= J. Augustus Johnson =

American attorney and consul in Syria

Jeremiah Augustus Johnson (June 3, 1836 – February 27, 1914) was an American attorney who was consul-general in Beirut when it was part of Ottoman-controlled Syria.

== Career ==
During his career, Johnson was instrumental in arranging the receipt by the Metropolitan Museum of Art of the first item they accessioned, a Roman marble sarcophagus with garlands, after J. Abdo Debbas, the American vice-consul at Tarsus, wrote to Johnson to offer the item to the U.S. government. Johnson replied that the government could not accept such a gift and the item was instead agreed to be presented to an American institution recommended by Johnson. After meeting John Taylor Johnston and other founders of the Metropolitan Museum of Art, it was agreed that the item should be received by them. Transit to the coast at Mersin was arranged by Debbas using a team of sixteen buffalo to pull the sarcophagus on a wagon. It then travelled by sea on the Shenandoah, arriving at the museum in late 1870.

== Personal life ==
Johnson was born in Boston, the son of Rev. Lorenzo Dow Johnson and Mary Burges. In 1856, Johnson married Sarah Barclay, daughter of James Turner Barclay, a missionary in Jerusalem who was the grandson of diplomat Thomas Barclay. They lived for several decades in Syria. They had seven children, all of whom died young or tragically. In 1885, at their home in Greenwich, Connecticut, their son Barclay shot and killed his mother and sister before killing himself. Barclay, who had been valedictorian of his Yale University class in 1882, was said to have become insane. Their son Tristam Burges Johnson, a Navy lawyer, was killed by a bolt of lightning in 1911.

The following year he married Frances Valeda Matthews. Their son Hallet was U.S Ambassador to Costa Rica.

He died in South Orange, New Jersey.
