= Cynthia A. Telles =

American academic and diplomat

Cynthia Telles
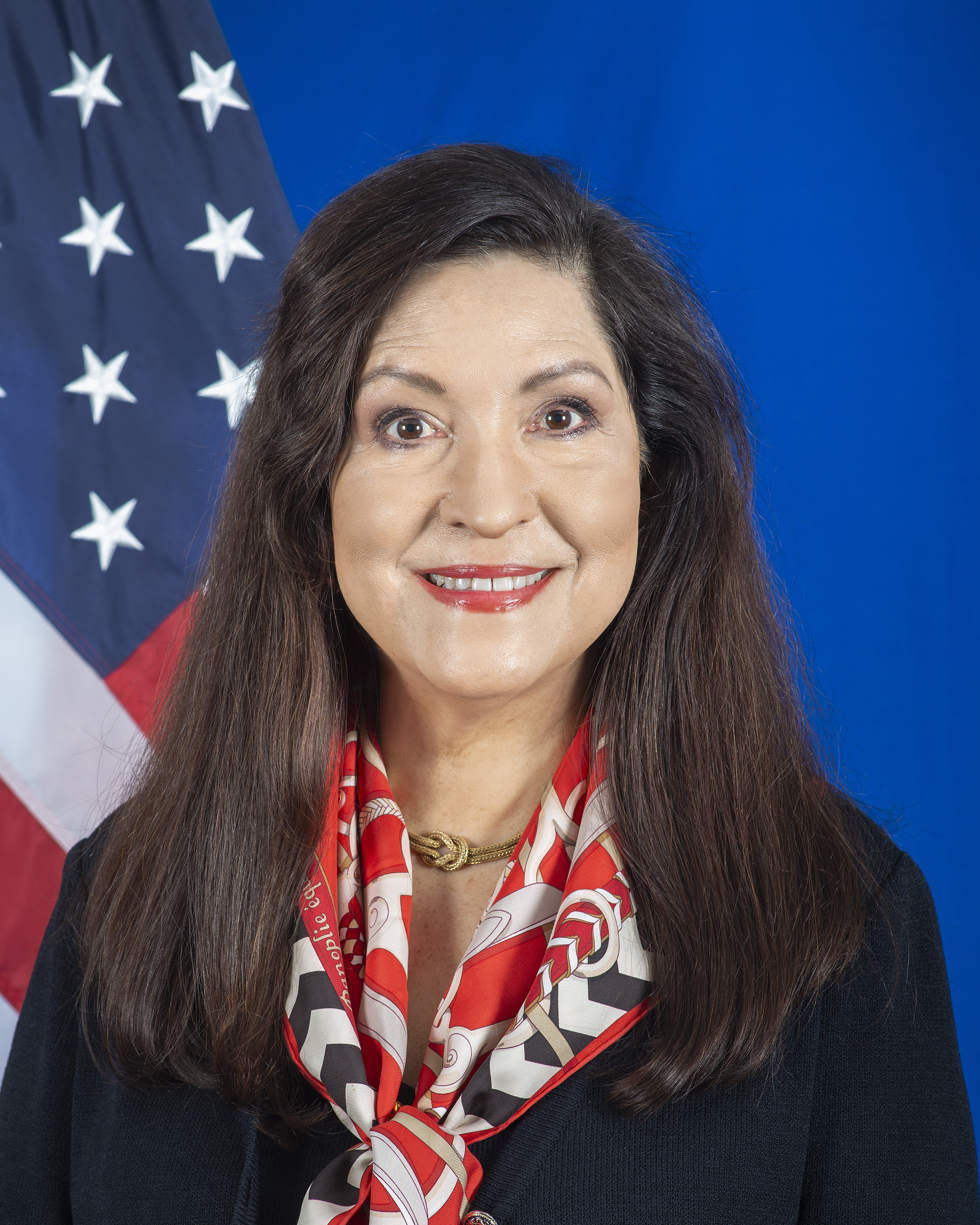
- Official portrait, 2022

United States Ambassador to Costa Rica
- In office March 11, 2022 – January 19, 2025
- President: Joe Biden
- Preceded by: Sharon Day
- Succeeded by: Melinda Hildebrand

Personal details
- Born: Cynthia Ann Telles
- Party: Democratic
- Spouse(s): David J. Jimenez (m. 1986, divorced) Robert Hertzberg (m. 1995; div. 2005) Joseph Waz (m. 2015)
- Relations: Raymond Telles (father); Monica C. Lozano (cousin)
- Children: 1
- Education: Smith College (BA); Boston University (PhD)

Cynthia Ann Telles is an American academic and psychologist who served as the United States ambassador to Costa Rica under Joe Biden. She is a clinical professor in the UCLA Department of Psychiatry at the David Geffen School of Medicine at UCLA and serves on the executive committee of the Semel Institute for Neuroscience and Human Behavior. She is the founding director of the Hispanic Neuropsychiatric Center of Excellence.

== Early life and education ==
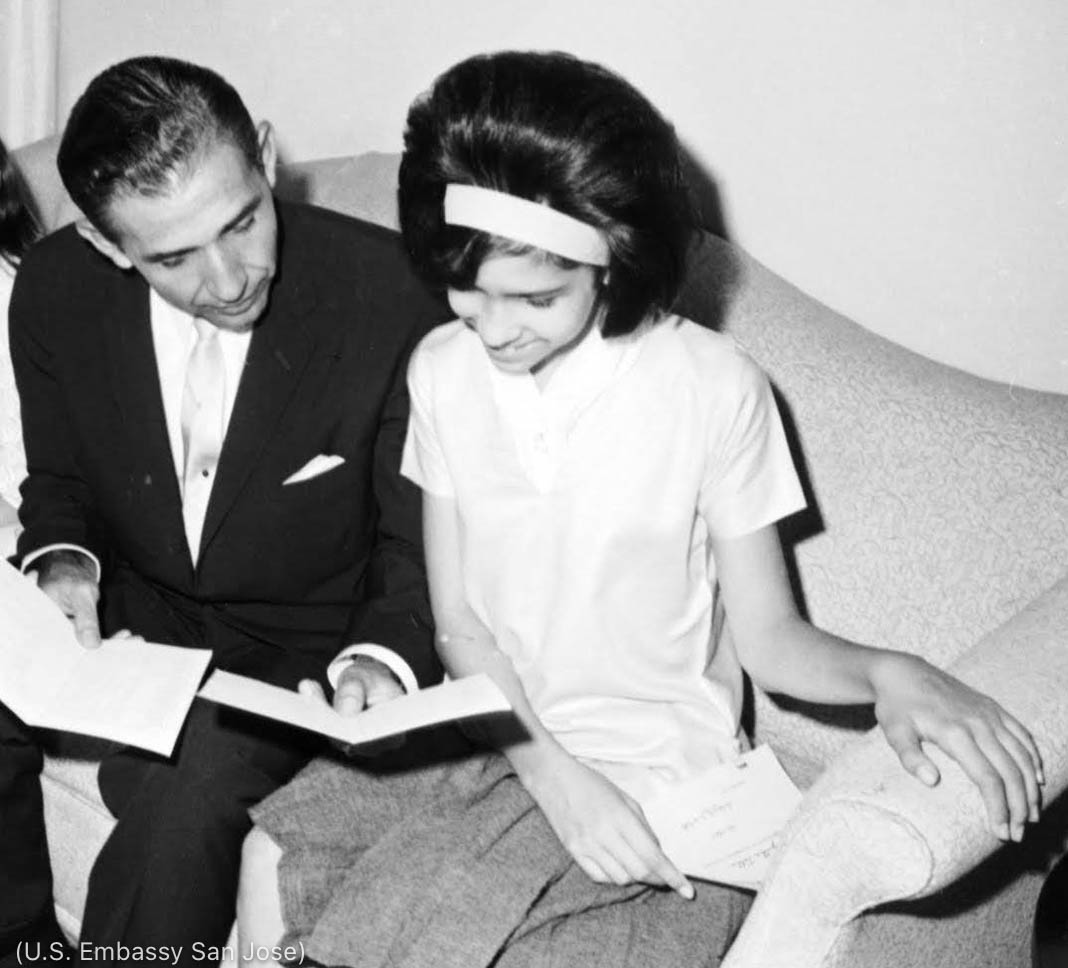
Costa Rica Ambassador Raymond Telles reads to his daughter, Cynthia, in December 1964.

Her father was Raymond Telles, the first Mexican-American mayor of a major American city, El Paso, Texas. She was raised in El Paso and moved to Costa Rica in 1961, when her father served as the U.S. Ambassador to Costa Rica under the John F. Kennedy administration. When she was 10, she nearly died after contracting viral encephalitis from a mosquito bite. By 12, she began volunteering at a hospital. After living in Costa Rica for six years, the family moved to Washington, D.C.

Telles received a Bachelor of Arts from Smith College and a Doctor of Philosophy in clinical psychology from Boston University. She moved to Los Angeles in the late 1970s to work on her doctoral dissertation.

== Career ==
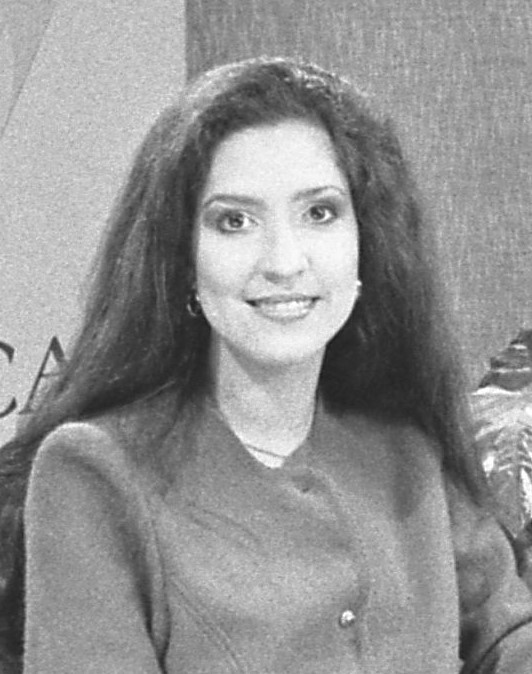
Telles in 1986

Telles has been the director of the UCLA Spanish-Speaking Psychosocial Clinic and is the founding director of the UCLA Hispanic Neuropsychiatric Center of Excellence.

Given her prominence within the Latino political circle in Los Angeles, commentators expected her to eventually enter a career in politics. However, in 1992, Telles insisted that she had no long term political agenda and declined to run for U.S. Representative Edward R. Roybal's seat after he announced his retirement.

Telles was a prominent donor to the Joe Biden 2020 presidential campaign.

=== Ambassador to Costa Rica ===
On June 15, 2021, President Joe Biden nominated Telles to be the next US Ambassador to Costa Rica. On June 23, 2021, her nomination was sent to the Senate. Hearings on her nomination were held before the Senate Foreign Relations Committee On September 22, 2021. On October 19, 2021, her nomination was reported favorably out of committee. On December 18, 2021, her nomination was confirmed by the United States Senate via voice vote. She presented her credentials to the Vice Minister for Bilateral Affairs and International Cooperation, Adriana Bolaños Argueta, on March 10, 2022, and to the President of Costa Rica Carlos Alvarado Quesada on March 11, 2022.

=== Boards ===
In Los Angeles, she has served on the Board of the Pacific Council on International Policy, and was the Chair of the Los Angeles/U.S. Section of the Mexico-Los Angeles Commission. She has served on numerous City of Los Angeles Commissions, including on the Board of Airport Commissioners since 2013 and the ethics commission.

She was a founding board member of Americas United Bank and was a board member of Burlington Northern Santa Fe, LLC. She has served as chairperson on the California Community Foundation and The California Endowment.

On the national level, Telles was appointed by President Barack Obama to the White House Commission on Presidential Scholars in 2010 and has served on the National Advisory Council of SAMHSA during the Clinton administration.

Telles served on the board of directors of Kaiser Permanente from 2009 until 2021.

Telles was on the board of directors of General Motors from 2010 to June 2014.

== Personal life ==
Telles is fluent in Spanish. She is related to Monica C. Lozano.

Telles was married to California State Senator Robert Hertzberg. They divorced in 2005. Telles has been married to Joseph Waz, a telecommunications executive, since 2015.

== Select awards and recognition ==
- First Annual Achievement Award for Mental Health Public Service
- American Psychological Association Minority Fellowship Program
- Leadership Award — National Hispanic Medical Association/National Hispanic Health Foundation
- Benjamin Joy Award — honoring Ambassador Telles and Mission San Jose team for advancing US commercial diplomacy. x.com

Diplomatic posts
Preceded by Sharon Day	United States Ambassador to Costa Rica; 2022–2025	Succeeded by Melinda Hildebrand
