= John F. Martin Jr. =

American diplomat

John F. Martin Jr. was an American diplomat who served as Ambassador to Costa Rica from 1920 to 1921.
