= Melinda Hildebrand =

American businesswoman

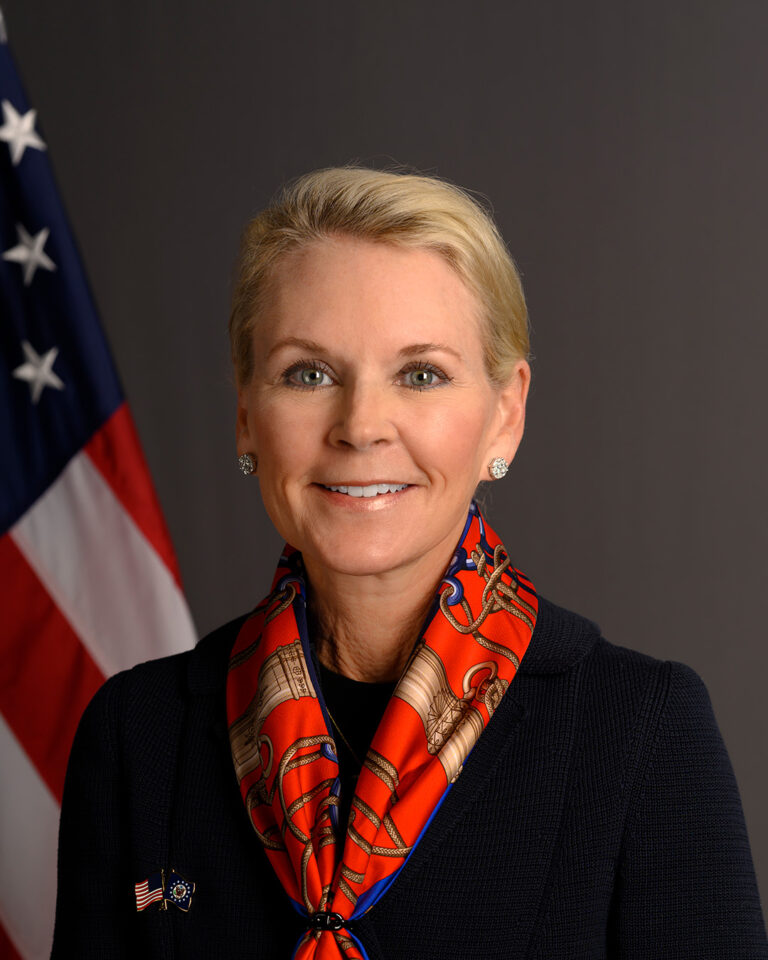
- Official portrait, 2026

44th United States Ambassador to Costa Rica
- Incumbent
- Assumed office January 8, 2026
- President: Donald Trump
- Preceding: Cynthia A. Telles

Personal details
- Born: United States
- Spouse: Jeffery Hildebrand
- Children: 3
- Education: University of Texas at Austin (BBA)
- Occupation: Businesswoman • diplomat

Melinda "Mindy" Hildebrand is an American diplomat and businesswoman who has been the United States ambassador to Costa Rica since 2026. Hildebrand was nominated by President Donald Trump in 2025 and confirmed by the United States Senate on October 7, 2025. She presented her credentials on January 8, 2026. Hildebrand and her oil billionaire husband Jeffery Hildebrand are megadonors to Donald Trump's presidential campaigns.

== Diplomatic nomination ==
On September 3, 2025, Hildebrand appeared before the U.S. Senate Foreign Relations Committee as President Trump's nominee for U.S. ambassador to Costa Rica. Her nomination was confirmed by the United States Senate on October 7, 2025.

== Career ==
She is the president of the Hildebrand Foundation and vice president of Hilcorp Ventures, Inc.

Hildebrand has served on a wide range of boards, committees, and nonprofit organizations, both locally and nationally, including:

- MD Anderson Cancer Center – President's Executive Council, Board of Visitors
- University of Texas at Austin – Development Board, McCombs Advisory Council, Executive Committee for the What Starts Here campaign
- University of St. Thomas (Houston) – Advisory Board
- Museum of Fine Arts, Houston – Bayou Bend and European Arts Subcommittees
- Episcopal High School (Bellaire, Texas) – Executive Committee and Endowment Committee
- James Beard Foundation (New York City) – Board Member

She has also been active with the Houston Livestock Show and Rodeo International Committee for more than three decades, and is a sustaining member of the Junior League of Houston.

== Personal life ==
Hildebrand is married to Jeffery Hildebrand, with whom she has three children.

== See also ==
- List of ambassadors appointed in the second Trump presidency

Diplomatic posts
Preceded by Cynthia A. Telles	United States Ambassador to Costa Rica; 2026–present	Vacant
