= Hilcorp =

American oil and gas company

- Type: Private
- Industry: Oil and gas
- Founded: 1989; 37 years ago in Texas
- Founders: Jeffery Hildebrand
- Headquarters: Houston, Texas, U.S.
- Area served: United States
- Key people: Jeffery Hildebrand; Greg Lalicker (CEO)
- Number of employees: 3,400 (2025)
- Website: hilcorp.com

Hilcorp is a privately held American energy exploration and production company that was founded in 1989. The company is headquartered in Houston, Texas, with operations in nine different states. It has 3,400 employees worldwide, including 1,500 in Alaska.

== History ==
The company was co-founded by Jeffery Hildebrand in 1989. Hildebrand bought out his partner for sole ownership. Hildebrand stepped down as CEO in 2018, promoting CEO Greg Lalicker to the position. Luke Saugier is the senior vice-president of operations in Alaska.

Hilcorp is the largest privately held oil company in the US, by volume.

The company's strategy is to acquire declining facilities and get more production out of them, while also increasing efficiency in late life fields. In 2020, the company bought BP's assets in Prudhoe Bay, Alaska, for $5.6 billion. About half of BP's employees in Alaska transitioned with the takeover. Exxon transferred operations in Point Thompson to Hilcorp in 2021 though it maintains a 60% ownership of the facilities.

The company owns the largest share of the Trans-Alaska Pipeline System, after purchasing BP's 49% stake in 2019.

Hilcorp notably paid all of its employees a $100,000 bonus in 2015, and paid a $75,000 bonus to every employee in 2021.

=== Environmental impact ===
Hilcorp was named in a 2021 report by the Clean Air Task Force, an environmental non-government organization with offices in Massachusetts and the Netherlands, which states that the company was emitting more than 140,000 metric tonnes of methane. Hilcorp's focus is on extending the productive life of legacy (also known as late-life) assets, which are typically older and higher emitting. However, by retrofitting the assets with modern technology such as low-bleed pneumatics and using other advanced techniques, Hilcorp claims that they have been able to reduce greenhouse gas (GHG) emissions on Alaska's North Slope by 36% and in the San Juan Basin by 58% since acquiring the assets in 2016.

The Pennsylvania Department of Environmental Protection claimed in 2017 that Hilcorp's fracking operations in the state caused a chain of earthquakes in the prior year.

In April 2021, the Pipeline and Hazardous Materials Safety Administration ordered the company to repair and replace an under-sea section of the pipeline in the Cook Inlet.

In October 2024, Hilcorp was subject to an enforcement action brought by the Department of Justice for widespread Clean Air Act violations across its New Mexico operations. The Department of Justice found that "Hilcorp’s actions resulted in thousands of tons of harmful methane and VOC emissions being released into the environment. Methane is a climate super pollutant and potent greenhouse gas that contributes to climate change, and VOCs adversely affect human health in multiple ways, including being involved in the formation of ground level ozone."
