= Hallett Johnson =

American diplomat (1888–1968)

United States Ambassador to Costa Rica
- In office February 14, 1945 – January 20, 1947
- Preceded by: Fay Allen Des Portes
- Succeeded by: Walter J. Donnelly

Personal details
- Born: Francis Hallett Johnson; November 26, 1887 New York City, New York, U.S.
- Died: November 26, 1968 (aged 81) Boston, Massachusetts, U.S.
- Resting place: Rosedale Cemetery (Orange, New Jersey)
- Education: Columbia University School of Law; Williams College; Hotchkiss School; Cutler School
- Profession: diplomat, lawyer

Francis Hallett Johnson (November 26, 1887 – August 11, 1968) was an American career diplomat and ambassador to Costa Rica. He served in the United States Foreign Service for 36 years.

== Early life ==
Johnson was born in New York City. He was the son of Jeremiah Augustus Johnson (1836–1912), a diplomat and lawyer, and his second wife, Frances "Fannie" Valeda Matthews, who were married in 1886. His father's first marriage had ended in tragedy when his wife and their daughter were killed by their son Barclay in a murder-suicide in 1885. He grew up in South Orange, New Jersey.

He was a student at Cutler's School, where he joined the Knickerbocker Greys youth cadet corps, which became Company K of the 7th Regiment. He also went to the Hotchkiss School, graduating in 1904. He attended Williams College, graduating in 1908. There, he was a member of the Fraternity of Delta Psi (St. Anthony Hall) and leader of the mandolin club. He was a member of the debating team and played on the tennis team. He was also a member of the Williams College Good Government Club which visited President Theodore Roosevelt at the White House.

He attended the Columbia University School of Law, focusing on international law and graduating in 1912. While there, he lived in the Columbia chapter house of St. Anthony Hall for his second and third years.

== Career ==
After law school, Johnson became a lawyer in New York City with Davies, Auerbach, Cornell & Barry. On May 27, 1912, Johnson took the diplomatic service entrance exam in Washington, D.C. On June 18, 1912, the U.S. Department of State announce that Johnson was one of the successful candidates.

=== Great Britain ===
In August 1912, President William Howard Taft appointed Johnson the third secretary at the London embassy. Johnson said, "When I received a telegram from the State Department assigning me as Third Secretary to the London Embassy, I could not resist accepting it. It was a particularly desirable post, and my father knew Whitelaw Reid, who was then Ambassador to Great Britain." At the time, the staff of the London embassy consisted of the first secretary, second secretary, third secretary, military and naval attaché, two clerks, and two messengers—meaning that his position was fairly significant. While in England, Johnson was presented to the King George V and Queen Mary, attended various royal affairs, and had an interesting conversation with Prince Albert.

In February 1913, newspapers in the United States, Canada, and England reported that 24-year-old Johnson was left in charge of the London embassy with just six months experience due to the death of first secretary Reid and the resignation of second secretary Cressen. This was of concern because Johnson would then have been responsible for negotiating treaties with Great Britain, including the six power loan to China and the Panama Canal free tolls. However, in his journal, Johnson wrote, "I was surprised to read in many English papers the other day the fact that I have been in charge of the Embassy for the last two months—in fact, ever since Mr. Reid's death. This state of things nearly did come to pass, for Mr. Laughlin received a telegram from Knox assuming that Cressen had taken leave, telling him that unless he was confirmed, which seemed very doubtful, he should turn the Embassy over to me on the 4th of March. Laughlin…received confirmation about a week before that date."

=== Ottoman Empire ===
In May 1914, he was transferred to the Constantinople embassy for the Ottoman Empire where he was also Third Secretary. He reported in Constantinople on July 4, 1914. This was on the eve of World War I and Turks was contemplating siding with Germany—Johnson noted the number of German soldiers in Turkish uniforms was increasing. Gradually, the other embassies closed, and most Americans left Constantinople, including Johnson's mother and sister. However, before America entered the war, Johnson was ordered to return to Washington, D.C., in 1915. Taking advantage of the recall to take some on leave, he attended a party at Sagamore Hill; there, former President Theodore Roosevelt asked him about Constantinople.

=== Chile and Bolivia ===
Next, Johnson was sent to Santiago, Chile, arriving in August 1915. He wrote, "When the Ambassador Henry Fletcher found that I could not speak or type Spanish, in which he was fluent, he gave me 50 pages in Spanish to translate and type. When I came to, several weeks later, I knew something of both." However, Fletcher was replaced with Ambassador Joseph Shea, who not only did not know Spanish, but also had no experience in diplomacy. As a result, Johnson did most of the work. In Chile, Johnson implemented what became his diplomacy strategy: "I have always found that one can do best if it is possible to make informal friends with the highest local officials." He befriended Juan, the son of Juan Louis Sanfuentes, president of Chile.

In the summer of 1917, Johnson was sent to La Paz, Bolivia for four months while the minister to Bolivia took leave. At 12,000 feet (3,700 m), La Paz is the highest post in the world for U.S. diplomats, and it took a while to acclimate to the altitude. The saddle horse he brought from Peru died a few days after arriving in response to the thin air. After his summer in Bolivia, Johnson returned to Chile and resumed his duties.

=== Washington, D.C. ===
In February 1918—after six years abroad—Johnson was transferred to Washington D.C. He became the acting chief of the division of Latin American Affairs for the Department of State. However, with responsibility for so many countries, he frequently worked into the night. He left this position in May 1920.

=== Belgium and Sweden ===
In 1920, he became the first secretary of the embassy in Brussels, Belgium. While there, he dined with the Queen of Holland, the King and Queen of Spain. In early 1922, he was transferred to Stockholm, Sweden, where he was the first secretary of the American legation.

=== Spain ===
However, he moved on to Madrid, Spain in 1923. Unfortunately, his working relationship with Ambassador Alexander P. Moore was strained—Johnson said that Moore, who had been married to the late Lillian Russell, was a name-dropper who "worshipped royalty and entertained them continually." In addition, Johnson wrote that Moore "was not interested in work," and on top of that was rude to his wife. The Spanish Minister of Foreign Affairs also disliked Moore and bypassed the ambassador to negotiate the renewal of the United States commerce agreement and tariffs with Johnson. Johnson also benefited from the ambassador's frequent trips to Paris or the United States as he received invitations to entertainments and dinners at the Royal Palace. In the summer, the diplomatic corps left Madrid for San Sebastián on the sea.

=== France ===
In 1924, he became the first secretary of the American embassy in Paris, France. Johnson wrote, "The work was fascinating, covering the European situation resulting from the postwar treaties. I received a commendation from Washington for a long summary of all the treaties France had been a party to since the end of World War I. While in Paris he also had some experiences with American celebrities. After Charles Lindbergh completed his solo flight across the Atlantic, he frequently dined with Johnson. Johnson was also the bride's witness for the marriage of movie star Gloria Swanson and the Marquis De La Falaise De La Coudray on January 28, 1925.

=== Norway ===
In August 1927, he was transferred from Paris, to Oslo, Norway where he was also the first secretary. Johnson said, "My work in Norway was interesting but not exciting. One of my principal reports went into great detail to show that Norwegian socialism was a comparatively healthy national brand and had no relationship or communication with Communist Russia."

=== Netherlands ===
In August 1929, he was assigned to serve as the counselor to the legation at The Hague in the Netherlands. A counselor ranks next to the ambassador and is the chargé d'affaires in the ambassador's absence. With its location in the Netherlands, the embassy was a "listening post" for Europe. Johnson noted that Queen Wilhelmina was serious, formal, and "the only woman I remember who completely scared me." Her consort, Prince Henry, was friendly and casual.

=== Republic of Spain ===
In December 1933, he was transferred from The Hague, becoming a counselor for the United States embassy in Madrid, Spain. Since his previous post in Spain, the country had become a republic. This time, the ambassador was Claude Bowers, a Jeffersonian Democrat who supported the Republic even though it was corrupt, and had no use for General Francisco Franco. Johnson said, "I wrote the political dispatches until the Franco movement began, but since I tried to see the situation objectively, Bowers became dissatisfied with my reporting and took over these dispatches himself. He was impregnated with such a strong bias in favor of the Republicans that there is an inevitable distortion in some of his writings covering the period."

While Johnson was in Spain's summer capital of San Sebastian, the Spanish Civil War began. From July 20 to July 25, 1936, he was trapped at the Continental Palace hotel without any outside communication, along with 25 others consisting of the American embassy staff, the British ambassador, and the German ambassador. When he could get the word out, Johnson reported that "conditions were horrible" and that the city had no government. Author Edna Ferber reported on the situation in Spain from personal experience, writing that 100 leftist soldiers—formerly civilian farmers, peasants, and factory workers—entered the Continental Palace hotel with sub-machine guns and rifles. Despite shooting randomly at walls, the soldiers were "polite to foreigners."

A week later, he was still in Spain, helping American refugees leave the country. Ferber noted, "But before Hallett Johnson left San Sebastian, every American was evacuated. He and his staff have done a superb job."

In January 1937, there was heavy bombing in Madrid across the street from the former Johnson residence. Other bombs fell within 150 yards of the U.S. embassy.

=== Poland ===
In 1936, he became the consul general and chargé d'affaires for the embassy in Warsaw, Poland. Part of his duties involved creating economic reports on how this undeveloped country could be helped. Johnson noted the vast difference between the poor and the rich.

=== Sweden ===
In December 1937, Johnson was recalled from a leave of absence at his home on Bar Harbor, Maine, and was sent to Stockholm, Sweden. He was assigned as the consul general, counselor of legation, and chargé d'affaires. Sweden was located between Germany and Russia, and Norway had already been invaded by the Germans. As a result, Johnson was told to leave his family behind. In April 1940, he warned Americans to prepare to evacuate Stockholm "in case of certain contingencies." Americans were also urged to keep their papers or passports on hand. He also cautioned that the embassy had limited funds to assist people and that transportation would be at a premium for those who waited until the last minute to leave.

As his stay in Stockholm continued, goods were not crossing into Sweden, and items such as coffee, sugar, soap, and washing materials were rationed. In addition, the country was under a blackout, and there had been no hot water for two months. On December 10, 1940, Johnson left Stockholm to return to the United States. However, the Germans did not invade Sweden. Later, Johnson wrote the following, which was published in The Saturday Evening Post on June 19, 1943:

It seems that the eighty-five-year-old monarch, who still played tennis three times a week, got a telephone call from Hitler. "Your majesty, " said Hitler, "it is time that our two countries should begin to cooperate more closely and, eventually, become a nation." "Now Herr Hitler," said the King, "I am an old man. Too old to take on the rule of eighty million more people."

On June 23, 1943, the United States War Office sent Johnson a letter asking for a release to reprint and distribute his piece to the foreign press in Europe and Asia.

=== State Department ===
Johnson worked in Washington, D.C., from 1941 through 1945. Most of his work involved the War Supply and Resources Division. He also assisted with negotiations with the Swedes, who were selling ball bearings to the Germans after their factories had been destroyed.

=== Costa Rica ===
After the end of WWII, Johnson was given the choice of two positions—returning to Chile or Costa Rica. He chose the latter. On December 13, 1944, he was appointed ambassador to Costa Rica and started his work there on February 14, 1914. A producer of bananas, coffee, and sugar, Costa Rica was considered strategic because of its location near the Panama Canal. As was his practice, he traveled across Costa Rica to get to know the country; he also became friends with president Don Teodoro Picado Michalski and often went horseback riding with him. During the riots of the Vanguardia Popular, Michalski asked Johnson to ride with him in an open car "to reassure the populace of the friendship between Costa Rica and the United States." Despite the cautions of his staff, Johnson agreed. Nothing happened on that drive, but on a leisure trip with the president to an extinct volcano, the volcano became active upon their arrival.

When he realized that most Costa Ricans knew little about the United States and, therefore, did not always trust his motives, Johnson met with DeWitt Wallace, the publisher of Reader's Digest. He got Wallace to donate 3,000 free subscriptions to the Spanish version of the magazine for Costa Ricans. Johnson also studied Spanish so that he could give a speech to the Costa Rican Congress in their language. The newspaper, La Prensa Libre reported that deputy Alvaro Cubillo said, "I was greatly pleased by the democratic gesture of Ambassador Johnson."

While in Costa Rica, Johnson established a Cultural Center with a library of American books, established a Lincoln School, acquired land from the Costa Rican government to construct a chancery, and negotiated the purchase of 14 acres (5.7 ha)to build an embassy residence. He also met monthly with an advisory committee of American businessmen, as well as with heads of United States government agencies, to improve communication and cooperation.

Franklin D. Roosevelt died in April 1946, and tradition was that ambassadors automatically resigned when the president changes. However, President Harry Truman did not accept Johnson's resignation, so he continued as the ambassador to Costa Rica. He stayed in this position through May 16, 1947, submitting his resignation for personal reasons on March 25, 1947.

=== Other work ===
Johnson continued with the Foreign Service until he retired in 1948. However, he worked on a project for the United States Foreign Operations Administration, preparing a paper on the possibility of an economic union for Central American countries. He also undertook a project that involved finding and reporting on confidential agents in Europe. During this trip, he was able to visit past friends such as Prince Bertil in Sweden and Olaf, now King of Norway.

He also joined the Citizens Committee for Reciprocal World Trade.

== Publications ==
- "Now Herr Hitler." The Saturday Evening Post (June 19, 1943)
- "Civil War in Costa Rica: A Former Diplomat Comments on the Present Not Too Serious Conflict." New York Herald Tribune
- "Service Rivalry." New York Times Herald.
- Diplomatic Memoirs: Serious And Frivolous. New York: Vantage Press, 1963.

== Personal life ==
Johnson married Katherine Elizabeth Steward on May 20, 1920, at Grasslands, her family's home in Goshen, New York. She was the youngest daughter of Margaret Beckman and Campbell Steward of New York City and Goshen. Her uncle was Governor of Rhode Island Robert Livingston Beeckman. They had three children: Hallett Johnson Jr., Katherine Johnson, and Priscilla Johnson. Their oldest daughter, Katherine, was born in Brussels, and daughter Priscilla was born in Stockholm. Their youngest child, son Hallett Johnson Jr., was born in Paris. When not abroad, they lived in Princeton, New Jersey. They also had a summer home at Bar Harbor, Maine, called Rosebriar Cottage.

On August 19, 1941, Johnson was one of sixteen prominent Americans who signed a statement urging the support of the 8-point plan proposed by President Franklin D. Roosevelt and Winston Churchill, prime minister of Great Britain. The statement said, "We must not again lose the peace and should therefore begin an immediate study of world-wide collective security." Other signers included Rev. Samuel Elliott, director of the Religious Education Association; William T. Manning, Episcopal Bishop of New York; Henry Morgenthau Sr., former ambassador and father of the treasury secretary; and George Ashton Oldham, Episcopal Bishop of Albany.

He was an Episcopalian and member of the Sons of the American Revolution and the Society of Colonial Wars. He was also a member of the Union Club of the City of New York, the American Luncheon Club in London, the Chevy Chase Club, and the Metropolitan Club in Washington, D.C. He was also a governor of the Pot and Kettle Club and the Bar Harbor Club.

In 1968, Johnson died at the Massachusetts General Hospital in Boston at the ages of 79. He was buried at Rosedale Cemetery in Orange, New Jersey.

Diplomatic posts
Preceded by Fay Allen Des Portes	United States Ambassador to Costa Rica; 1945–1947	Succeeded by Walter J. Donnelly
