= Thomas J. Dodd Jr. =

American diplomat and academic

United States Ambassador to Costa Rica
- In office November 26, 1997 – March 1, 2001
- President: Bill Clinton; George W. Bush
- Preceded by: Peter Jon de Vos
- Succeeded by: John J. Danilovich

United States Ambassador to Uruguay
- In office September 23, 1993 – September 1, 1997
- President: Bill Clinton
- Preceded by: Richard C. Brown
- Succeeded by: Christopher C. Ashby

Personal details
- Born: 1935 (age 90–91)
- Relations: Thomas J. Dodd (father); Chris Dodd (brother)
- Education: Georgetown University (BSFS); George Washington University (MA, PhD)

Military service
- Branch/service: United States Army

Thomas Joseph Dodd Jr. (born 1935) is an American diplomat and academic who served as the United States Ambassador to Uruguay (1993–1997) and to Costa Rica (1997–2001).

== Early life and education ==
Dodd gained an affinity for speaking Spanish as a teenager while going down to the docks in his hometown in Connecticut, where he often interacted with Spanish speaking-immigrants who worked as fishermen. He obtained his B.S.F.S from the School of Foreign Service in 1957. He went on to earn his Master of Arts and PhD from George Washington University, where he was also formerly an adjunct professor.

== Career ==
Dodd was a Second Lieutenant at Fort Holabird in Baltimore from 1958 to 1959. From 1960 to 1961, he was a captain in the United States Army, where he was assigned to the Military Intelligence Detachment with the 49th Armored Division. Dodd was awarded the Army Commendation Medal in 1961.

Dodd has taught Latin American history and diplomacy at the School of Foreign Service for over 30 years, where he is professor emeritus. He has written several books on Latin America and edited the papers of the Colombian diplomat Tomás Herrán. Dodd is also the author of a biography of Tiburcio Carias. He is a member of the Inter-American Foundation board of directors.

== Personal life ==
Dodd is the son of the late former U.S. Senator Thomas J. Dodd and brother of former U.S. Senator Chris Dodd.

== Books ==
- Tiburcio Carias: Portrait of a Honduran Political Leader, Louisiana State University Press, 2005.
- Managing Democracy in Central America: United States Election Supervision in Nicaragua, 1927-1933, Lynne Rienner Publishers, 1992
- The Letters of Tomás Herrán and the Panama Crisis, 1900-1903.

== See also ==
- List of ambassadors of the United States to Uruguay
- List of ambassadors of the United States to Costa Rica

Diplomatic posts
Preceded by Richard C. Brown	United States Ambassador to Uruguay; 1993–1997	Succeeded by Christopher C. Ashby
Preceded by Peter Jon de Vos	United States Ambassador to Costa Rica; 1997–2001	Succeeded by John J. Danilovich
