= The Fayetteville Observer =

Newspaper in Fayetteville, North Carolina

- Type: Daily newspaper
- Format: Broadsheet
- Owner: USA Today Co.
- News editor: Beth Hutson
- Opinion editor: Myron B. Pitts
- Founded: 1816
- Language: American English
- Headquarters: 581 Executive Place; Fayetteville, North Carolina 28305 USA
- City: Fayetteville
- Circulation: 19,427 (as of 2018)
- ISSN: 2155-9740
- OCLC number: 45115389
- Website: fayobserver.com

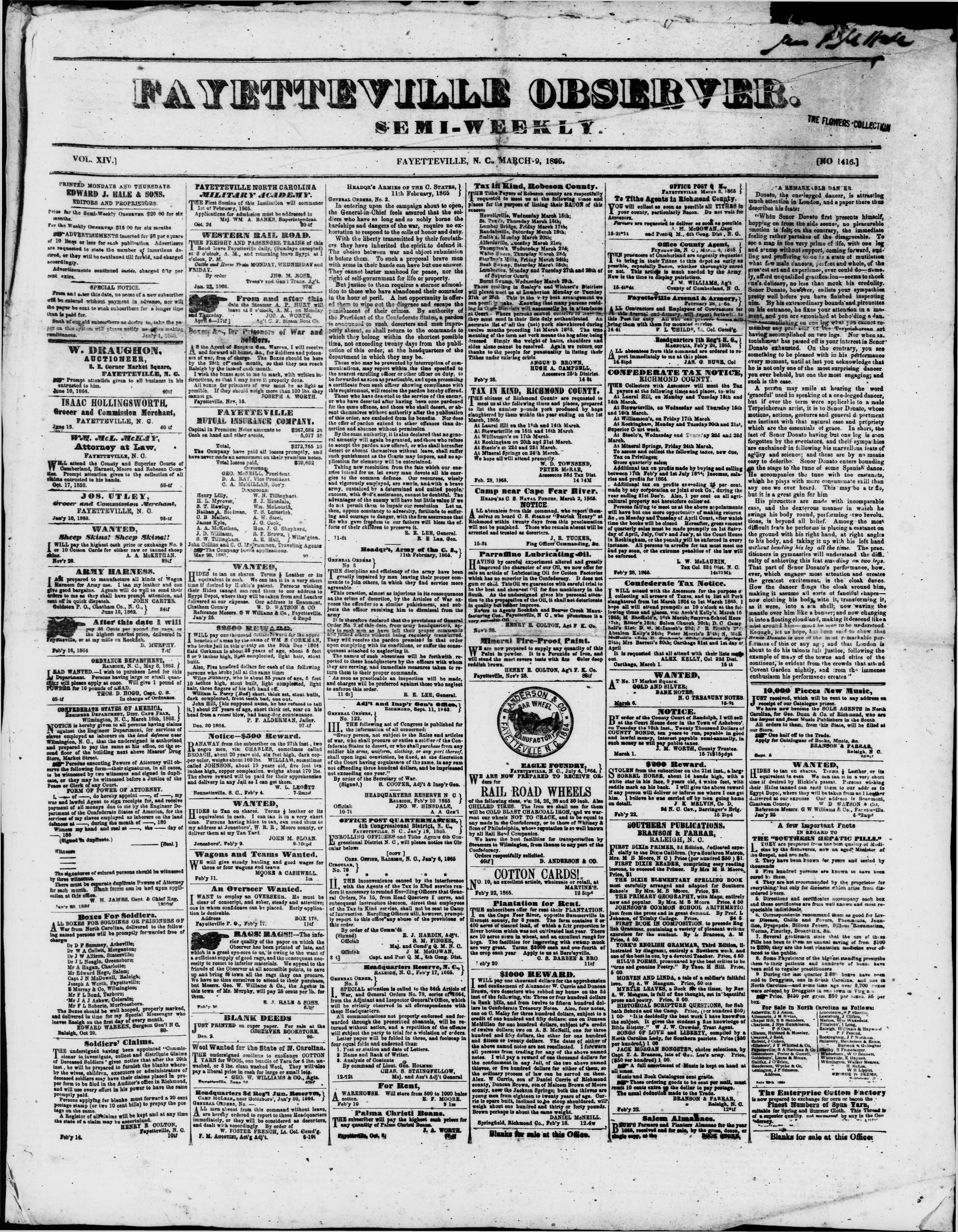
Front page of the March 9, 1865 Fayetteville Observer

The Fayetteville Observer is an American English-language daily newspaper published in Fayetteville, North Carolina. Founded in 1816, it is the oldest local newspaper published in North Carolina. The paper originally operated as the Carolina Observer before rebranding to the Fayetteville Observer in 1833.

It was locally owned by the McMurray family from 1923 to 2016, when it was acquired by GateHouse Media, which became Gannett in an acquisition in 2019.

== History ==
The Fayetteville Observer is the oldest newspaper in North Carolina. It was founded in 1816 as the Carolina Observer. The Fayetteville Observer was not published between 1865 and 1883, so the Wilmington Star-News (founded in 1867) is North Carolina's oldest continually published newspaper. The name was changed to the Fayetteville Observer in 1833. The Observer's offices were destroyed by William T. Sherman's invading army in 1865. It was refounded as The Fayetteville Observer in 1883. W. J. McMurray bought the paper in 1923, and his family-owned Fayetteville Publishing Company ran the paper for four generations.

Edward Jones Hale was the editor of the newspaper from 1825 to 1865. The paper was a leading supporter of the Whig party. The content of the paper during this time period included many historical articles about North Carolina and accounts of the Civil War. The Hale family moved to New York after the newspaper buildings were destroyed in the Civil War. His son, Edward Joseph Hale returned to North Carolina in 1883 to revive the newspaper and continued ownership of the newspaper until 1919 when it was sold to a group of local businessmen.

The Fayetteville Publishing Company was founded in 1923. A Sunday edition of the paper was started in 1957. Originally an afternoon paper, it began publishing a morning paper, The Fayetteville Times, in 1973. The two papers published combined editions on Sunday, and from 1982 onward published a combined Saturday edition as well. In 1990, the McMurrays merged the Observer and Times into a single morning paper, The Fayetteville Observer-Times. It dropped "Times" from its flag in 1999. The Fayetteville Observer launched its first website in 1995 and it has a presence on Facebook for distribution of news and interaction with readers.

In March 2022, The Observer moved to a six day printing schedule, eliminating its printed Saturday edition.

== Awards ==
The Fayetteville Observer is a member of the North Carolina Press Association. The newspaper has received the following awards:

- 2002, recognized as one of the 50 best-printed papers in an international color-quality competition
- 2010, 2011, 1st place in excellence for large newspapers, awarded by the North Carolina Press Association
- 2018, Melissa Sue Gerrits, Hugh Morton Photographer of the Year, North Carolina Press Association; 1st Place in General Excellence

== See also ==
- List of newspapers in North Carolina
