= Mark Langdale =

American lawyer

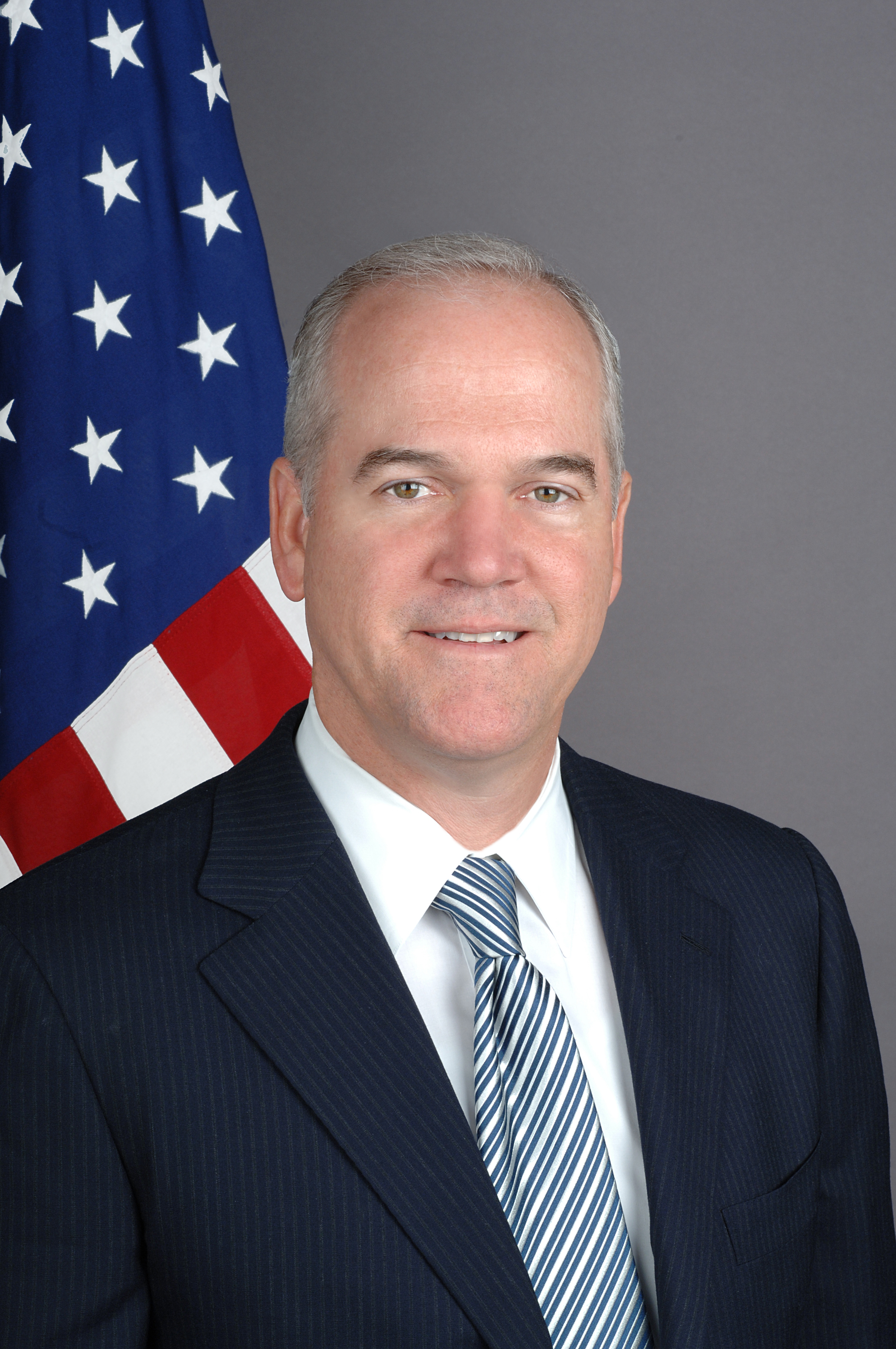

United States Ambassador to Costa Rica
- In office November 8, 2005 – January 22, 2008
- President: George W. Bush
- Preceded by: John J. Danilovich
- Succeeded by: Peter E. Cianchette

Personal details
- Born: 1954 (age 71–72)
- Education: University of Texas at Austin; University of Houston

Mark Langdale (born 1954) is a businessman and former U.S. ambassador to Costa Rica (2005 to 2008). He is a member of the Board of Directors for the George W. Bush Presidential Center.

== Education ==
Langdale earned a bachelor of business administration from the University of Texas at Austin (1975), and a bachelor of laws from the University of Houston School of Law (1977). He practiced law in Houston for ten years.

== Career ==
While Ambassador, he focused on the ratification of the Central America Free Trade Agreement. Before his appointment, he was president of Posadas USA from 1989 until 2005 (a subsidiary of Grupo Posadas) and Chairman of the Texas Department of Economic Development from 1997 to 2001.
