= Jacob B. Blair =

American judge (1821–1901)

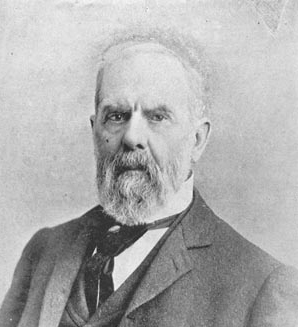

United States Ambassador to Costa Rica
- In office October 6, 1868 – June 30, 1873
- President: Andrew Johnson
- Preceded by: Albert G. Lawrence
- Succeeded by: George Williamson

Member of the U.S. House of Representatives
- In office December 17, 1863 – March 3, 1865
- Preceded by: None (District created)
- Succeeded by: Chester D. Hubbard
- Constituency: West Virginia 1st
- In office December 2, 1861 – March 3, 1863
- Preceded by: John S. Carlile
- Succeeded by: Leslie L. Byrne (District re-created: January 3, 1993)
- Constituency: Virginia 11th

Personal details
- Born: Jacob Beeson Blair; April 11, 1821 Parkersburg, Virginia (now West Virginia), U.S.
- Died: February 12, 1901 (aged 79) Salt Lake City, Utah, U.S.
- Resting place: Mount Olivet Cemetery; Salt Lake City, Utah, U.S. 40.755°N 111.850°W
- Party: Union

Jacob Beeson Blair (April 11, 1821 – February 12, 1901) was a U.S. representative from Virginia and from West Virginia, and later a justice of the Wyoming Supreme Court.

== Life and career ==
Born in Parkersburg, West Virginia (then Virginia), Blair studied law and was admitted to the bar in 1844. He was a lawyer in private practice and served as prosecuting attorney, Ritchie County, West Virginia (then Virginia as well).

Blair was elected as a Unionist from Virginia to the Thirty-seventh Congress to fill the vacancy caused by the resignation of United States Representative John S. Carlile. Blair served in this capacity from December 2, 1861 to March 3, 1863. He was then elected to the Thirty-eighth Congress from West Virginia, serving from December 7, 1863 to March 3, 1865.

He was United States Minister to Costa Rica from 1868 to 1873. He later served as associate justice of the Supreme Court of Wyoming from 1876 to 1888. He was a probate judge for Salt Lake County, Utah from 1892 to 1895, and surveyor general of Utah from 1897 to 1901.

== Death ==
He died in Salt Lake City and was interred in Mount Olivet Cemetery there.

== See also ==
- West Virginia's congressional delegations

== Sources ==
- United States Congress. "Jacob B. Blair (id: B000525)". Biographical Directory of the United States Congress.

U.S. House of Representatives
Preceded by John S. Carlile	Member of the U.S. House of Representatives from Virginia's 11th congressional district 1861-1863	Succeeded by None
Preceded by None	Member of the U.S. House of Representatives from West Virginia's 1st congressional district 1863-1865	Succeeded by Isaac H. Duval
