= Sharon Day =

American politician & diplomat

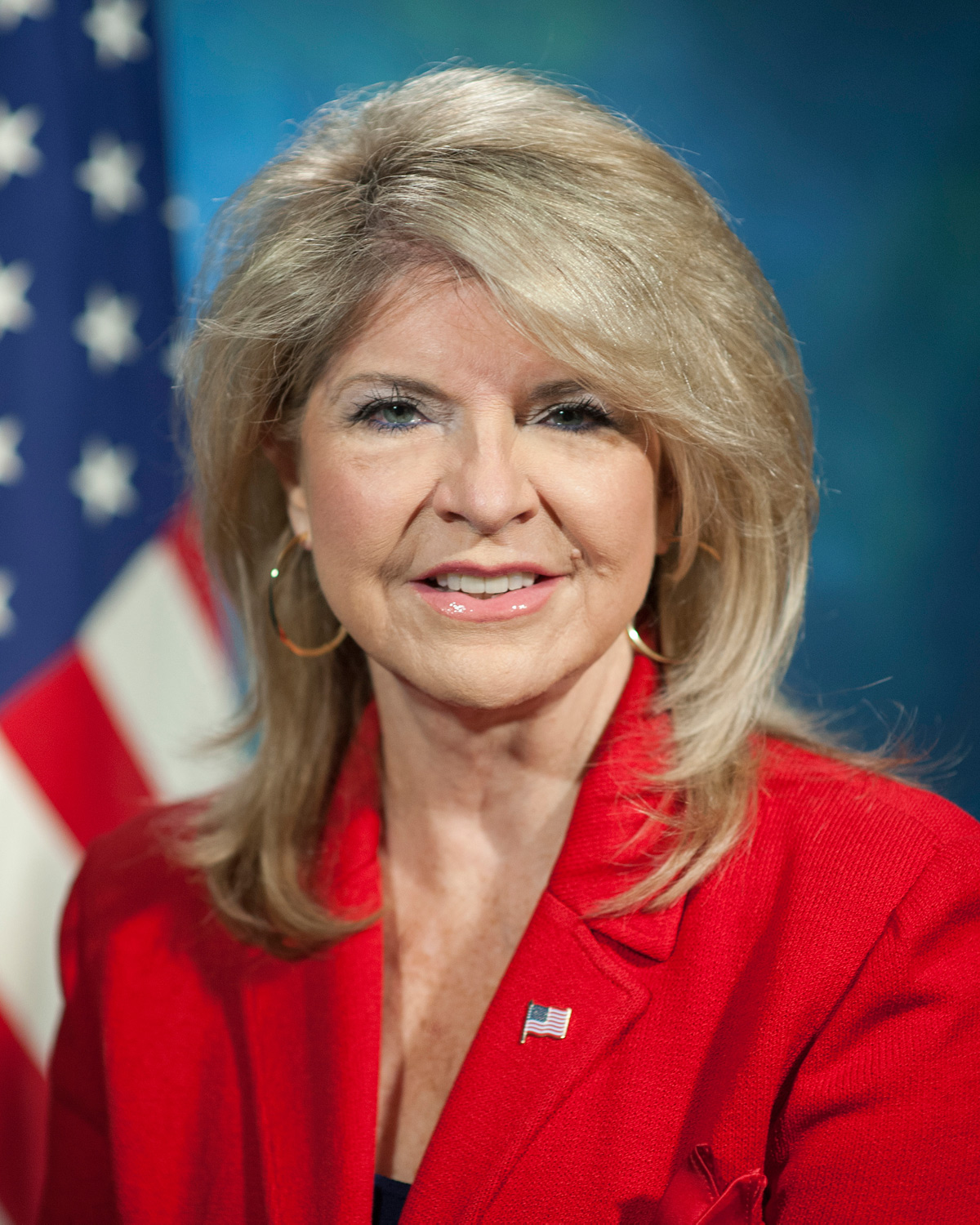

United States Ambassador to Costa Rica
- In office September 25, 2017 – January 20, 2021
- President: Donald Trump
- Preceded by: S. Fitzgerald Haney
- Succeeded by: Cynthia Telles

Personal details
- Born: 1951 (age 74–75) Texas, U.S.
- Party: Republican

Sharon Day is the former United States Ambassador to Costa Rica. She previously served as the co-chairwoman of the Republican National Committee. She resigned on January 19, 2021.

== Career ==
Day owned an insurance company in Indianapolis with her husband. They sold the company, which had 156 employees, in the early 1990s and retired to South Florida.

Day has served on different Republican Party committees on the local, state, and national level since the 1990s. Day became a precinct committeeman in 1994, state Republican committeeman for Broward County in 1996, national committeewoman representing Florida in 2004, and national party secretary in 2009. She lost a bid for national party chair in 2010 when Jim Greer resigned. She has served as national party co-chair since 2011 and has been re-elected into 2015.

== Personal life ==
Day resided in the Galt Mile neighborhood in Fort Lauderdale, Florida. She has been a lifelong Republican. She was married to Larry Day. They have two children. Larry died in 2012.

Diplomatic posts
Preceded by S. Fitzgerald Haney	United States Ambassador to Costa Rica; 2017–2021	Succeeded by Cynthia Telles
