= Donald Harrington (diplomat) =

American diplomat

Donald Harrington was an American ambassador to Costa Rica in 1993.
