= Edward J. Hale =

American soldier, journalist, and diplomat

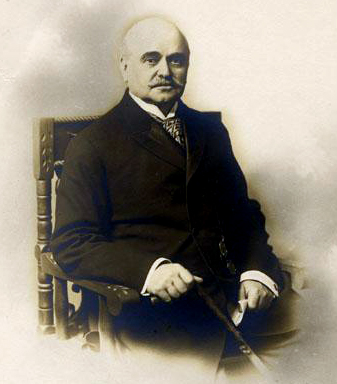
Edward Jones Hale, editor and owner of The Fayetteville Observer 1825-1865, Fayetteville, North Carolina

Edward Joseph Hale (December 25, 1839 – February 15, 1922) was an American diplomat and journalist. He was the Ambassador to Costa Rica from 1913-1917 and publisher of The Fayetteville Observer from the mid-1860s to 1919.

== Biography ==
Born in Fayetteville, North Carolina, he was youngest son of his parents. His parents were Margaret Walker and Edward Jones Hale, a newspaper editor and owner of the political newspaper The Carolina Observer.

He attended the University of North Carolina at Chapel Hill, receiving a B.A. and an LL.D. While there, he was a member of the fraternity of Delta Psi (a.k.a. St. Anthony Hall).

During the civil war, he served in 5th North Carolina Infantry, Confederate States of America. He was later appointed to the staff of General James Henry Lane as major. He was promoted to assistant adjunct and inspector general. At the end of the war he was recommended for promotion to brigadier general, but did not achieve the rank.

== Career ==
General Sherman destroyed the Carolina Observer's building immediately on entering Fayetteville in 1865. After the war, Hale briefly has a publishing business in New York. He returned to Fayetteville and resuming publication of the Observer, renamed The Fayetteville Observer as its editor and publisher. Hale's four sons joined the business, and it remained in the family until sold in 1919.

His diplomatic career began when President Grover Cleveland appointed him as consul for Manchester, England. In 1913 he became ambassador to Costa Rica, under the presidency of Woodrow Wilson. He remained ambassador until 1917, he was recalled after the overthrow of the government of Costa Rica, leading the Wilson administration to refuse to recognize their new government.

In between the two diplomatic appointments, he was the moving force behind the creation of the canal system of the Cape Fear River.
