= George Williamson (Australian footballer) =

Australian rules footballer (1866–1929)

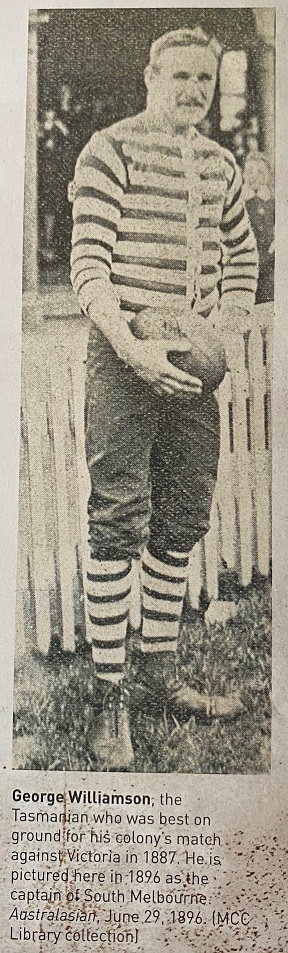

Personal information
- Full name: George Henry Williamson
- Born: 14 January 1866; Launceston, Tasmania
- Died: 22 June 1929 (aged 63); South Melbourne, Victoria

George Henry Williamson (14 January 1866 – 22 June 1929) was an Australian rules footballer who played with South Melbourne in the Victorian Football League (VFL).

== Family ==
The son of William Williamson (1843–1915), and Sarah Williamson (1838–1919), née Hamilton, George Henry Williamson was born at Launceston, Tasmania on 14 January 1866. His younger brother, John Hamilton Williamson (1870–1956), was also an excellent footballer.

He married twice: to Alice Windley (1858–1912), the sister of Bill Windley, in 1901, and to Maud Jewson (1887–1927) in 1920.

== Football ==
Originally from the Tamar Rowing Club Football Club in Launceston Tasmania, Williamson was named second-best player in Tasmania's first match on Victorian soil against the VFA at the MCG on May 21, 1887.

He played for Williamstown in the 1888–89 seasons (29-33 matches, 2 goals). Following accusations of bribery in a loss to lowly Footscray in 1889, Williamson crossed to Footscray for the 1890–91 seasons (30 games, 9 goals), then St Kilda in 1892 (14 games, one goal), and then playing back in Tasmania, and at Albert Park Juniors before arriving at South Melbourne in 1895.

He then went on to play 29 VFA games and kick one goal with South Melbourne in 1895–96, captaining the Club in 1896 (the club's last in the VFA before the formation of the VFL), including the 1896 premiership match loss to Collingwood, in which he played at centre half-back. Williamson then played 12 VFL games with South without kicking a goal in 1897–98 before retiring at the age of 32.

On 9 June 1898 he was cleared from South Melbourne to Albert Park.

== Death ==
Williamson died on 22 June 1929, at the age of 63 in the Homeopathic Hospital (later Prince Henry's Hospital) in St Kilda Road, South Melbourne.
