= George Williamson (diplomat) =

American diplomat

Minister Resident to Costa Rica
- In office August 13, 1873 – January 31, 1879
- President: Ulysses S. Grant; Rutherford B. Hayes
- Preceded by: Jacob B. Blair
- Succeeded by: Cornelius A. Logan

Minister Resident to Nicaragua
- In office November 1, 1873 – January 31, 1879
- President: Ulysses S. Grant; Rutherford B. Hayes
- Preceded by: Charles N. Riotte
- Succeeded by: Cornelius A. Logan

Minister Resident to El Salvador
- In office October 18, 1873 – July 7, 1879
- President: Ulysses S. Grant; Rutherford B. Hayes
- Preceded by: Thomas Biddle
- Succeeded by: Cornelius A. Logan

Minister Resident to Guatemala
- In office September 9, 1873 – January 31, 1879
- President: Ulysses S. Grant; Rutherford B. Hayes
- Preceded by: Silas A. Hudson
- Succeeded by: Cornelius A. Logan

George McWillie Williamson (1829–1882) was an American diplomat who served as US ambassador to Nicaragua, Costa Rica, El Salvador and Guatemala, under the administration of Ulysses S. Grant. as diplomatic representative he was resident in Guatemala.
