= George Williamson (academic) =

George Williamson (1898 - 8 September 1968) was professor of English, from 1940, at the University of Chicago where he worked from 1936 to 1968. He specialized in the English metaphysical poets.

== Selected publications ==
Williamson's works include:

- The Talent of T. S. Eliot ("University of Washington Chapbooks," No. 32.) Seattle: University of Washington Bookstore, 1929.
- The Donne Tradition. Cambridge, Mass.: Harvard University Press, 1930.
- The Senecan Amble: A Study in Prose Form from Bacon to Collier. London: Faber & Faber; Chicago: University of Chicago Press, 1951.
- A Reader's Guide to T. S. Eliot: A Poem-by- Poem Analysis. New York: Noonday Press, 1953.
- Seventeenth-Century Contexts. London: Faber & Faber, 1960.
- The Proper Wit of Poetry. London: Faber & Faber; Chicago: University of Chicago Press, 1961.
- A Reader's Guide to the Metaphysical Poets. London: Thames & Hudson, 1968.
