= Philip T. Chicola =

American diplomat

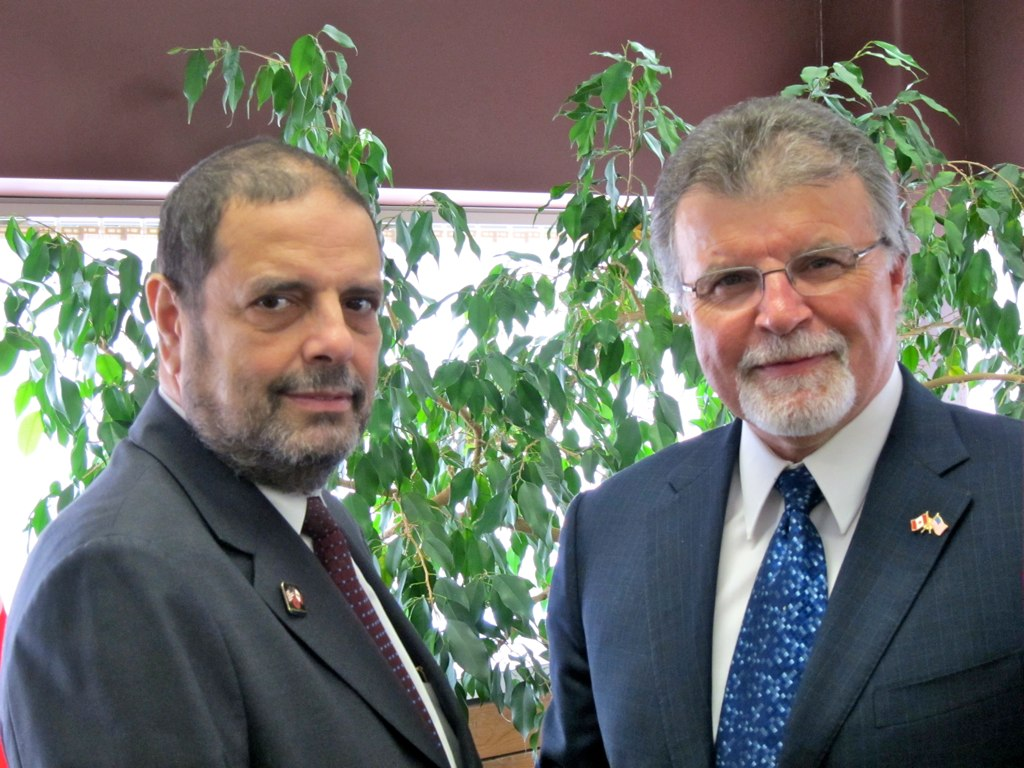
Phil Chicola with Yukon Premier Dennis Fentie

Philip T. Chicola (born 1946) is a retired Career Foreign Service Officer who served as Chargé d’Affaires ad interim at the US Embassy in Brazil from November 2005 until November 2006. Chicola also served as Consul General at the U.S. Consulate in Vancouver, B.C.

Raúl Reyes, described as a "senior Colombian guerrilla leader killed in Ecuador" in 2008, had a secret meeting with US diplomats in December 1998. The meeting was held in Costa Rica and was led by Chicola. At the time, he was director of the State Department's Office of Andean Affairs. Reyes was representing the Revolutionary Armed Forces of Colombia (FARC) which was listed on the State Department's list of Foreign Terrorist Organizations. Despite that, a State Department spokesman at the time said "this does not preclude meeting with FARC or any other foreign terrorist organization if we determine that such a meeting is consistent with our interests, including bringing an end to Colombia's long-running civil conflict and to the terrorist attacks that accompany it."

At the time, US policy focused on what could be done to halt drug trafficking. In 1999, aid to Colombia had tripled, amounting to $289 million. Chicola's mission in meeting with FARC leaders was to discuss their willingness to help eliminate drug crops in the areas they control. Also discussed were their kidnapping of foreigners and what had happened to three missing missionaries. FARC was accused of kidnapping them five years earlier.

== Biography ==
Born in Cuba, Chicola came to the U.S. in 1961, became a naturalized citizen in 1968. He graduated from Florida Atlantic University and did graduate work at Florida State University.
