= Joseph Becelia =

American diplomat

Joseph Becelia was an American chargé d'affaires of the United States to Costa Rica from 1993 to 1994.

Becelia is an adjunct professor at the Schar School of Policy and Government at the George Mason University.
