= Charles N. Riotte =

American diplomat

Charles N. Riotte (January 27, 1814 – May 24, 1887) was an American diplomat who served as US ambassador to Costa Rica and Nicaragua under the administration of Abraham Lincoln and Ulysses S. Grant.

== Biography ==
He was born in St. Wendel, Prussia. He studied law and served for some time as a judge in Prussia. He also worked as director of a railroad. He emigrated to the United States in 1849 and lived in San Antonio, Texas. By 1854 he became an American citizen.

He met Frederick Law Olmsted in West Texas. Olmsted would later help Riotte secure the post of U.S. minister to Costa Rica in 1861. By 1867, Riotte was appointed as U.S. ambassador to Nicaragua.

He died on May 24, 1887, in Switzerland.
