= Jerusalem Embassy Act =

United States law

Jerusalem Embassy Act of 1995
- Long title: An act to provide for the relocation of the United States Embassy in Israel to Jerusalem, and for other purposes.
- Acronyms (colloquial): JEA
- Enacted by: the 104th United States Congress
- Effective: November 8, 1995

Citations
- Public law: 104–45
- Statutes at Large: 109 Stat. 398

Codification
- Acts amended: None
- Titles amended: None
- U.S.C. sections created: None

Legislative history
- Introduced in the Senate as S. 1322 by Bob Dole (R-KS) on October 13, 1995; Committee consideration by Senate Committee on Foreign Relations, and House Committee on International Relations; Passed the Senate on October 24, 1995 (93–5 Roll call vote 496, via Senate.gov); Passed the House on October 24, 1995 (374–37 Roll call vote 734, via Clerk.House.gov); Left unsigned by President Bill Clinton and became law on November 8, 1995

The Jerusalem Embassy Act of 1995 is a public law of the United States passed by the 104th Congress on October 23, 1995. The proposed law was adopted by the Senate (93–5), and the House (374–37). The Act became law without a presidential signature on November 8, 1995.

The Act recognized Jerusalem as the capital of the State of Israel and called for Jerusalem to remain an undivided city. Its purpose was to set aside funds for the relocation of the Embassy of the United States in Israel from its location in Tel Aviv to Jerusalem, by May 31, 1999. For this purpose, it withheld 50% of the funds appropriated to the State Department specifically for "Acquisition and Maintenance of Buildings Abroad" as allocated in fiscal year 1999 until the United States Embassy in Jerusalem had officially opened.

Despite passage, the law allowed the President to invoke a six-month waiver of the application of the law, and reissue the waiver every six months on "national security" grounds. The waiver was repeatedly renewed by Presidents Clinton, Bush, and Obama. President Donald Trump signed a waiver in June 2017. On June 5, 2017, the U.S. Senate unanimously passed a resolution commemorating the 50th anniversary of reunification of Jerusalem (also known as the Israeli annexation of East Jerusalem) by 90–0. The resolution reaffirmed the Jerusalem Embassy Act and called upon the President and all United States officials to abide by its provisions. On December 6, 2017, Trump recognized Jerusalem as Israel's capital, and ordered the planning of the relocation of the embassy. However, following the announcement, Trump signed an embassy waiver again, delaying the move, as mandated by the Act, by at least six months. Legally, however, the U.S. embassy can be moved at any time without reliance on the Act.

On February 23, 2018, President Trump announced that the US Embassy in Israel would reopen at the Arnona consular services site of the then US Consulate-General in Jerusalem. The United States Embassy officially relocated to Jerusalem on May 14, 2018, to coincide with the 70th anniversary of the Israeli Declaration of Independence.

== Background ==
Jerusalem holds unique spiritual and religious interests, such as Holy Places and religious buildings or sites, among the world's Abrahamic religions of Judaism, Christianity, and Islam. Following World War I, the victorious Principal Allied Powers recognized these as "a sacred trust of civilization", and stipulated that the existing rights and claims connected with them should be safeguarded in perpetuity, under international guarantee. The terms of the British Balfour Declaration were included in the Mandate for Palestine by the League of Nations. The US government was not a party to these agreements; but stated official foreign policy in 1919 was to 'acquiesce' in the Balfour Declaration, but not officially support Zionism. On September 21, 1922, the US Congress passed a joint resolution stating its support for a homeland in Palestine for the Jewish people but not at the expense of other cultures present at the time. This occurred virtually the same day the Palestine Mandate was approved by the League of Nations; although official government findings about the affected peoples' choices concerning self-determination were available in government circles, they were withheld from the public until the following December. US foreign policy remained unchanged. These competing nationalist claims led to increasing civil violence during the inter-war period; following World War II, the "Question of Palestine" was placed before the United Nations, as the League's successor agency.

On November 29, 1947, the UN General Assembly adopted Resolution 181, the United Nations Partition Plan for Palestine; it contained a recommendation that Jerusalem be placed under a special international regime, a corpus separatum, administered by the United Nations and be separate from both the Jewish and Arab states envisioned. Following the conflict that ensued, cease-fires and the 1949 Armistice Agreements were negotiated and accepted by both sides. One of these resulted, in part, in a temporary division of Jerusalem. The relevant Armistice Agreement with Jordan was signed on April 3, 1949, but it was considered internationally as having no legal effect on the continued validity of the provisions of the partition resolution for the internationalization of Jerusalem. On April 25, 1949, King Abdullah officially changed the name of Transjordan to the Hashemite Kingdom of Jordan. He had secured the support of Great Britain (albeit qualified—Great Britain did not recognize the incorporation of East Jerusalem, maintaining that it ought to be part of a corpus separatum, an international enclave).

On December 5, 1949, the Israeli Cabinet, meeting in Tel Aviv, declared Jerusalem the capital of Israel, and on January 23, 1950, the First Knesset proclaimed that "Jerusalem was, and had always been, the capital of Israel." Moreover, on April 24, 1950, the Jordan House of Deputies and House of Notables, in a joint session, adopted a resolution annexing the West Bank and Jerusalem. Because the status of Jerusalem had been included previously in the UN Partition Plan, most countries did not accept this Israeli position, and most embassies have been located elsewhere.

The United States has stated that its policy on Jerusalem refers specifically to the geographic boundaries of the area that were set out for the "City of Jerusalem", or Corpus Separatum, in Resolution 181, but since 1950, US diplomats have traveled regularly to Jerusalem from the US Embassy in Tel Aviv to conduct business with Israeli officials. The United States has also stated that Jerusalem was part of Mandate Palestine, and in a de jure sense, has not since become part of any other sovereignty.After the capture of the entire city and the adjacent West Bank in the 1967 Six-Day War, the United States again reaffirmed the desirability of establishing an international regime for the city of Jerusalem.

Advocacy for the Jerusalem Embassy Act reached a zenith during particularly critical times in negotiations for the Oslo Accords of the peace process, despite opposition from both the Israeli and American administrations. The embassy move was, and continued to be, delayed by successive United States government in order to appear neutral on the issue of Jerusalem. However, on December 6, 2017, President Donald Trump announced that the US recognizes Jerusalem as the capital of Israel, and instructed the State Department to begin preparations to move the embassy.

There are allegations by a group of Palestinians that the site is owned by Palestinian Refugees whose property was confiscated by Israel in 1948.

== Details ==
The Act asserted that every country has a right to designate the capital of its choice, and that Israel has designated Jerusalem. The act notes that "the city of Jerusalem is the seat of Israel's President, Parliament, and Supreme Court, and the site of numerous government ministries and social and cultural institutions." Jerusalem is defined as the spiritual center of Judaism. Furthermore, it stipulates that since the reunification of Jerusalem in 1967, religious freedom has been guaranteed to all.

S.3(a)(2) and (3) also stated that "Jerusalem should be recognized as the capital of the State of Israel; and the United States Embassy in Israel should be established in Jerusalem no later than May 31, 1999".

Although the Senate and House votes preceded visits by then Israeli prime minister Yitzhak Rabin and Jerusalem Mayor Ehud Olmert to Washington to celebrate the 3000th anniversary of King David's declaration of Jerusalem as the capital of the Jews, little to no progress was achieved in the physical relocation of the U.S. Embassy to Jerusalem until December 2017.

=== Timetable ===
Section 3 of the Act outlined the U.S. policy and set the initial parameters for the secretary of state to report in order to receive the full funding — again, with a May 1999 target deadline for the appropriations. The section also briefly stated U.S. policy concerning the matter.

Sec. 3. Timetable.

(a) Statement of the Policy of the United States.—

(1) Jerusalem should remain an undivided city in which the rights of every ethnic and religious group are protected.
(2) Jerusalem should be recognized as the capital of the State of Israel; and
(3) the United States Embassy in Israel should be established in Jerusalem no later than May 31, 1999.

(b) Opening Determination.—

Not more than 50 percent of the funds appropriated to the Department of State for fiscal year 1999 for "Acquisition and Maintenance of Buildings Abroad" may be obligated until the Secretary of State determines and reports to Congress that the United States Embassy In Jerusalem has officially opened.

The major roadblock has been the question of what effect, if any, the relocation may symbolize for other interested parties or neighboring nations involved in the ongoing and sometimes quite contentious Mid-East diplomacy and foreign relations. For this reason, since the legislation's introduction, the consensus has been that this action poses considerable risk to United States national security at home and abroad.

=== Constitutional separation of powers ===
Under the Constitution of the United States the president has exclusive authority to recognize foreign sovereignty over territory. The Justice Department's Office of Legal Counsel concluded that the provisions of the Embassy Relocation Act "invade exclusive presidential authorities in the field of foreign affairs and are unconstitutional."

Former U.S. presidents Bill Clinton, George W. Bush and Barack Obama have alluded to or explicitly stated the belief that Congressional resolutions attempting to legislate foreign policy infringe upon the executive's authority and responsibility to carry out sound and effective U.S. foreign relations.

Regarding the status of Jerusalem specifically, President Bush had deemed Congress' role as merely "advisory", stating that it "impermissibly interferes with the President's constitutional authority". The U.S. Constitution reserves the conduct of foreign policy to the president; resolutions of Congress, such as the ones found in the Authorization Act of 2003 that included the Jerusalem Embassy Act's provisions, makes the arguments in favor of legislating foreign policy from Congress extremely problematic if not arguably invalid for that Constitutional reason.

Even from the Embassy Act's legislative beginnings, the question of Congress' over-reach, and whether it somehow usurped the Executive's authority or power over matters of foreign affairs, had played a subtle role in shaping the debate at the time. President Clinton took the unusual step of not signing the Embassy Act into law once Congress presented it to him, but instead, to show his disapproval, let 10 days of inaction pass, allowing the bill to return to Congress and automatically become law by Constitutional "default". Clinton's non-action reinforced this sticking point between the branches of the Federal government, without the potential public fallout from taking a "negative stand" on what appeared to be favorable, veto-proof legislation on the surface at the time.

=== Presidential waiver ===
This constitutional question was apparent while the legislation was working its way through both chambers; Sen. Dole's amendment adopted into the introduced language included a provision that, in part, returned to the Executive Branch the power over foreign affairs that it already had.

Sec. 7. Presidential Waiver.

(a) Waiver Authority.—

(1) Beginning on October 1, 1998, the President may suspend the limitations set forth in section 3(b) for a period of six months if he determines and reports to Congress in advance that such suspension is necessary to protect the national security interests of the United States.
(2) The President may suspend such limitations for an additional six-month period at the end of any period during which the suspension is in effect under this subsections if the President determines and reports to Congress in advance of the additional suspension that the additional suspension is necessary to protect the national security interests of the United States.
(3) A report under paragraph (1) or (2) shall include—

(A) a statement of the interests affected by the limitation that the President seeks to suspend; and
(B) a discussion of the manner in which the limitation affects the interests.

(b) Applicability of Waiver to Availability of Funds.—

If the President exercises the authority set forth in subsection (a) in a fiscal year for the purpose set forth in such section 3(b) except to the extent that the limitation is suspended in such following fiscal year by reason of the exercise of the authority in subsection (a).

Every six months from 1998 to 2018, every president invoked the waiver provision under section 7 of the Act, based on national security grounds, to defer the relocation of the embassy from Tel Aviv. The last waiver was signed by President Trump on December 7, 2018.

Since this provision went into effect in late 1998, all the presidents serving in office during this period have determined moving forward with the relocation would be detrimental to U.S. national security concerns and opted to issue waivers suspending any action on this front. However, a re-assessment has to take place every six months. In response, members of Congress have begun to include language to do away with the president's exclusivity in making the determinations or flat-out remove the waiver provision completely from the Embassy Act altogether.

== Developments ==
Noteworthy developments since the passage of the Act and well past the initial May 31, 1999 deadline's expiration:

- Of the 22 Presidential Determinations to suspend the limitations that were issued between 1998 and the fall of 2009, only the Bush era issuances included the wording:

[The current] Administration remains committed to beginning the process of moving our embassy to Jerusalem;

... while President Obama's issuances mirror the wording first used by President Clinton.

- Section 214 of the Foreign Relations Authorization Act, FY 2003 states:

The Congress maintains its commitment to relocating the United States Embassy in Israel to Jerusalem and urges the President ... to immediately begin the process of relocating the United States Embassy in Israel to Jerusalem.

The U.S. Congress, however, has the "power of the purse", and could prohibit the expenditure of funds on any embassy located outside Jerusalem. The U.S. Congress has not managed to repeat the incorporation or passage of language similar to that in Section 214, needed for any attempt to force a foreign policy change by withholding funding.

- Claims have arisen that as a result of the Embassy Act, official U.S. documents and web sites refer to Jerusalem as the capital of Israel, although this has been the case in many instances before the Act became law. The CIA World Factbook has carried the typical Federal citation concerning Israel's capital and the absence of the usual concentration of foreign embassies being within its boundaries or proximity.
- A potential site for a future US Embassy office building in Jerusalem has been demarcated by Israel and the US, and is maintained in the neighborhood of Talpiot. Until 2019, when the consulate-general was merged into the embassy, the United States had three diplomatic office facilities in Jerusalem: a consulate on Agron Road in West Jerusalem, a consular annex on Nablus Road in East Jerusalem, and a new office annex in the neighborhood of Arnona, located in an area of "no man's land" between East and West Jerusalem, which opened in October 2010.

In March 2011 a new bill, the Jerusalem Embassy and Recognition Act of 2011 (H.R. 1006), was introduced. Cosponsored by fourteen Members of Congress, including House Europe Subcommittee Chairman Dan Burton (R), House Foreign Affairs Committee Chairwoman Ileana Ros-Lehtinen (R) and House Middle East Subcommittee Chairman Steve Chabot (R), the bill would discontinue the Presidential waiver authority included in the 1995 Act, relocate the U.S. Embassy in Tel Aviv to Jerusalem, and affirm the city as the undivided capital of Israel. This bill died at the end of 2011, having failed to clear the House Foreign Affairs Committee.

=== Under President Trump ===
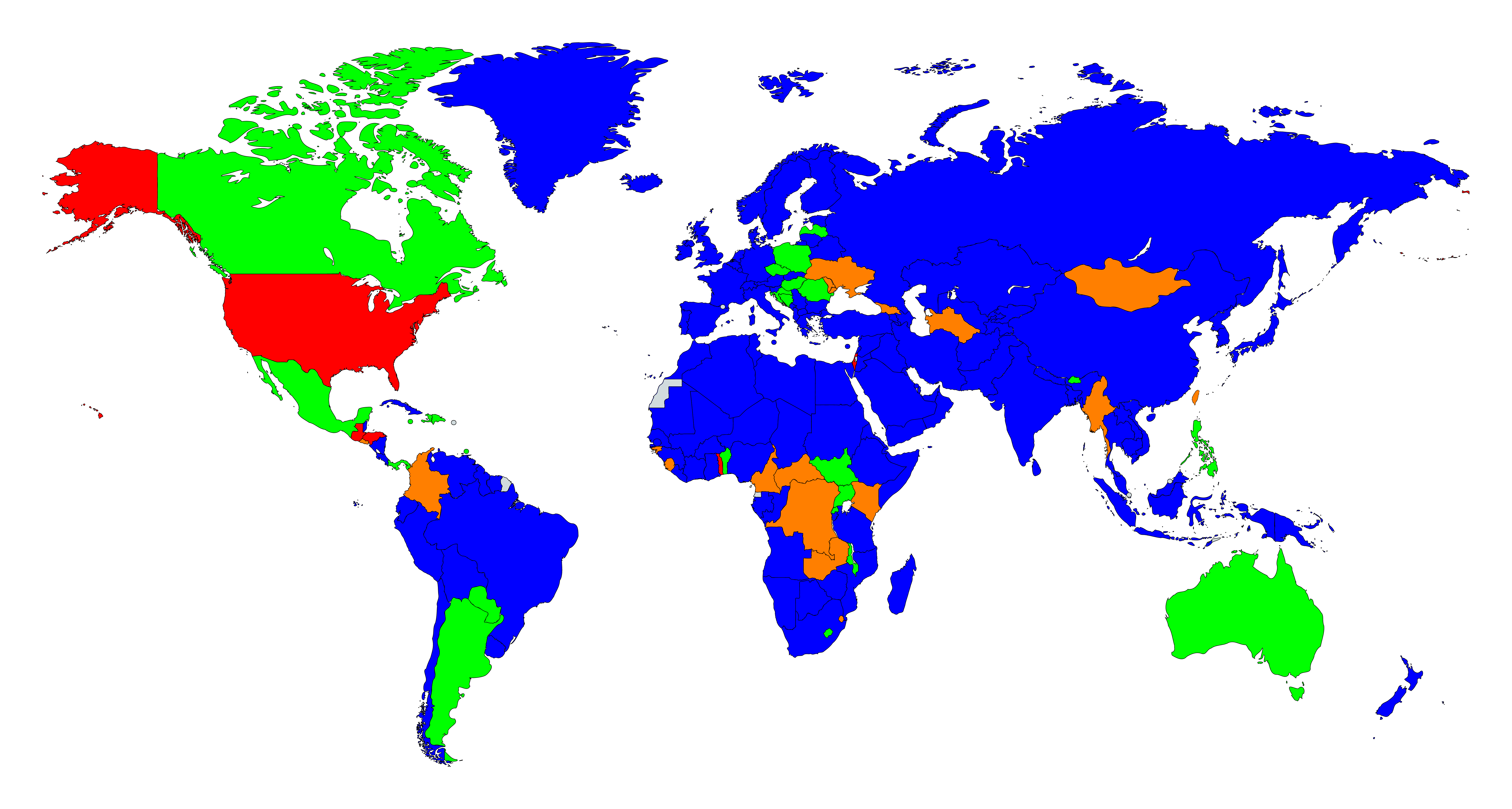
Countries votes about UN Resolution A/ES-10/L.22 (disapproval about US embassy moving in Jerusalem) on December 21, 2017. Favorable Against Abstained Not voted

President Donald Trump signed the embassy waiver on June 1, 2017. The White House meanwhile stated that it did not represent a weakening of his support for Israel. It added that he stood by his promise of moving the embassy. On June 5, 2017, the U.S. Senate unanimously passed a resolution commemorating the 50th anniversary of reunification of Jerusalem by 90–0. The resolution reaffirmed the Jerusalem Embassy Act and called upon the president and all United States officials to abide by its provisions.

On December 6, 2017, President Trump officially recognized Jerusalem as the capital of Israel, and ordered the State Department to begin planning for the relocation of the U.S. Embassy from Tel Aviv to Jerusalem. However, following the announcement, Trump signed an embassy waiver again, delaying the funding cuts as mandated by the Act, by at least six months. Secretary of State Rex Tillerson stated that the relocation process will begin immediately, but that the relocation itself however could take years to complete. Legally, however, the U.S. embassy can be moved at any time outside of the scope of the Act.

On February 23, 2018, Trump announced that the US Embassy in Israel would reopen at the Arnona consular services site of the US Consulate-General in Jerusalem on May 14, 2018, to coincide with the 70th anniversary of the Israeli Declaration of Independence. This announcement was welcomed by the Israeli Prime Minister Benjamin Netanyahu and other Israeli government officials. However, the announcement was condemned by Palestinian officials, including Hanan Ashrawi and chief negotiator Saeb Erekat, as the embassy's reopening will also coincide with the 70th anniversary of the "Nakba".

However, despite the move of the embassy to Jerusalem, President Trump signed on June 4, 2018, an executive order postponing the move of the embassy to Jerusalem, although it had already physically moved to that city. He was required to sign the order since the Jerusalem Embassy Act requires the US ambassador to have a permanent residence in Jerusalem, a condition already fulfilled as of May 8, 2019.

On October 18, 2018, United States Secretary of State Mike Pompeo announced that the US Embassy and consulate-general in Jerusalem would be merged into a single diplomatic mission. In early March 2019, the consulate-general was formally merged into the US Embassy in Jerusalem; ending the US practice of accrediting separate diplomatic missions to the Israelis and Palestinians. A Palestinian Affairs Unit was also established on the former Agron Street site of the consulate-general to conduct relations with the Palestinians.

=== Public opinion ===
A poll, taken in November 2017, by the Brookings Institution found that, of a national sample of 2,000 adults, 63% of Americans polled opposed the move of the embassy from Tel Aviv to Jerusalem, while 31% supported it. Among Democrats, 81% opposed the move and 15% were in support, while among Republicans, 44% opposed the move and 49% supported it.

In the 2017 AJC Survey of American Jewish Opinion, done in September 2017, it was found that 16% of American Jews polled supported an immediate move of the embassy to Jerusalem, 36% wanted to move the embassy at a later date in conjunction with Israeli-Palestinian peace talks, 44% opposed moving the embassy, and 4% said they were not sure.

== See also ==
- Embassy of the United States, Jerusalem
- Positions on Jerusalem
- Jerusalem Day
- Jerusalem Law
- United Nations Security Council Resolution 478
