= Fort Wayne mound site =

Archaeological site in Michigan, US

- Location in Michigan Location in United States
- 42°17′57″N 83°05′50″W
- Location: in Wayne County, Michigan

The Fort Wayne mound site was a prehistoric burial mound located on the grounds of the Ordnance Department of the former Fort Wayne in Detroit, Michigan. It was one of a series of mounds in Detroit, including the Springwells Mound Group, the Carsten mound and the Great mound at the River Rouge. By the mid-20th century only the Fort Wayne mound was still standing. Today, the remains of the mound—located near Officers' Row—is fenced off to visitors.

== History of investigations in the Detroit area ==
Scientific interest in the Detroit mounds goes back over 200 years. In 1817, Samuel Brown excavated one of the 3 mounds in the Springwells Mound Group, recovering bones, stone axes, arrowheads, and other artifacts. John Blois also excavated at the Springwells Group in 1837, reporting flexed burials associated with charcoal and grave goods including pottery vessels, arrowheads, stone knives, seashell beads and red pigment. Bela Hubbard in 1887 reported that 2 of the Springwell Mounds had already been destroyed by gravel excavations at that point, and cultural materials such as bones, pottery, shell beads, stone knives and arrowheads could be seen on the surface in the site area.

In 1876, Henry Gillman conducted excavations at the Fort Wayne mound under the auspices of the Detroit Scientific Association. He was the first to use modern scientific excavation methods, carefully recording the provenances of the burials and providing detailed descriptions of the bones and artifacts. He estimated the mound to be approximately 5 feet above ground level at that time, and seventy feet in diameter, and stated that it was undoubtedly much reduced from the original size.

These site reports, and other early accounts, are old enough that they went out of print years ago. John Halsey of the University of Michigan includes long verbatim quotes from these early reports in the volume Contributions to Michigan Archaeology, for the benefit of a new generation of archaeologists.

== Summary of 1944 excavations ==
In 1944, at the request of the commandant at Fort Wayne, the mound was excavated by Carl Holmquist under the auspices of the Aboriginal Research Club of Detroit. They recovered 24 burials (including a dog burial), many of which were associated with grave goods. Other artifacts were recovered that were not associated with burials.

Burials were primarily flexed or bundle burials. Late Woodland Wayne Ware vessels were associated with many of the burials. The excavators noted that most, if not all, of the grave goods were associated with female burials, implying that females held important status positions in their culture.

The following artifacts were recovered from the 1944 excavations:

- Chipped stone – including projectile points, knives, drills, end scrapers and side scrapers, and lithic flakes
- Ground stone – including sharpening stones, a celt, a gorget, an adze, a hammerstone, and birdstone figurine
- Bone – including a needle and an awl
- Shell – including shell beads and a columella bead necklace
- Pipes – several clay pipe fragments were present
- Marbles – three small spherical marbles (two stone and one clay) were present

Some of these artifacts are illustrated and discussed further below.

=== Results of data analysis ===
==== Animal remains ====
The animal remains were dominated by deer bone. Also present were raccoon, muskrat, turtle, fish and clam, as well as the dog burial. These remains were not modified into tools like the bone tools described in the Artifacts section below, and may be considered food remains or, in the case of the dog, possibly the remains of ceremonial activities. Dog sacrifice was observed to have ceremonial and religious implications in early Native American tribes.

==== Artifacts ====
===== Pottery artifacts =====
Archaeologists often find pottery to be a very useful tool in analyzing a prehistoric culture. It is usually very plentiful at a site, and the details of manufacture and decoration are very sensitive indicators of time, space, and culture.

The 1944 excavations yielded several complete vessels associated with burials, which aided in the analysis. The pottery was sorted using the typology introduced by James Fitting based on the study of pottery at the nearby Michigan site of Riviere Au Vase.

Two Late Woodland pottery ware groups were present at the Fort Wayne mound. The first, Wayne ware, is an early Late Woodland ware thought to have evolved out of the Middle Woodland period. Wayne ware is usually cordmarked and quite plain and utilitarian, with little decoration. The other group is Riviere ware, first identified at the Riviere Au Vase site and associated with the Western Basin (aka Younge) tradition. This ware group is more elaborate and is often collared and/or castellated. Both ware groups were specially segregated at the site, and both were observed to have food residues resulting from use as a cooking pot.

There was also a fair amount of Early Woodland Marion thick ware present; representing a possible occupation before the Wayne and Western Basin traditions, or indicating Early Woodland roots for either (or both) of the Late Woodland traditions.

The following are descriptions of the pottery types present at the Fort Wayne mound:

Type	No. of vessels	Illustration	Description	Cultural affiliation
Marion thick	2		Consists of grit-tempered jars with thick vessel walls up to 1.0 cm or more and cordmarked interior and exterior surfaces.	Early Woodland
Wayne Ware, variant: crosshatched	7		Criss-cross decoration on rim and shoulder area; usually on exterior surface but sometimes on interior surface, or both surfaces	Late Woodland / Wayne tradition
Wayne ware, variant: punctate	2		Punctate decoration applied to the rim or neck area	Late Woodland / Wayne tradition
Wayne Ware, variant: corded punctate	2		Like Wayne punctate except punctations are applied with a cord-wrapped stick	Late Woodland / Wayne tradition
Wayne ware, variant: cord-impressed	2		Cord-impressed decoration on a cordmarked surface	Late Woodland / Wayne tradition
Wayne cordmarked	15		cordmarked surface up to lip; lip decorated with cord-wrapped stick impressions	Late Woodland / Wayne tradition
Springwells net-impressed	16		Collared and sometimes castellated; net-impressions on rim and lip	Late Woodland / Western Basin tradition
Vase Dentate	1		Cordmarked or fabric-wrapped paddle impressed surface finish; decorated with oblique, vertical or herringbone impressions along the rim, made with a dentate stamp or comb. Collared rims are common, but castellations are rare	Late Woodland / Western Basin tradition
Vase Tool-impressed	4		Similar to Vase Dentate except castellations are more common.	Late Woodland / Western Basin tradition
Vase Corded	14		Similar to Vase Dentate and Vase Tool-impressed except the impressions are made by a cord-wrapped paddle instead of stamping with a tool; rims are mostly castellated, and sometimes also collared.	Late Woodland / Western Basin tradition
Macomb Linear	5		Castellated rims which are sometimes collared; and roughened or smoothed over cordmarked or fabric-impressed surface. Design motifs include horizontal impressions and triangles forming lines parallel to the base of the collar, or following the castellations.	Late Woodland / Western Basin tradition

==== Other artifacts ====
The non-pottery artifacts found at an archaeological site can provide useful cultural context as well as a glimpse into the domestic tasks performed at a site; ceremonial or religious activities; recreational activities; and clothing or personal adornment.

Some of the most prominent and diagnostic non-pottery artifacts are presented here in more detail:

Material	Description	Image	Qty	Function / use	Comments / associations
Chipped stone	Jack's Reef corner-notched projectile points		7	Hunting/fishing/warfare	7 of 9 projectile points recovered from the Fort Wayne mound are Jack's Reef points, which are diagnostic of the Middle Woodland Kipp Island phase of the Point Peninsula complex; located in Ontario and New York State
Ground stone	Sharpening stone		3	Domestic function / sharpening tool	Present as grave goods associated with burials
Ground Stone	Birdstone		1	Artwork / Decorative and/or Ceremonial application	Characteristic of Early Woodland
Shell	Columella bead necklace		1	Personal Adornment and/or Ceremonial application	May have been worn on an everyday basis or may have been part of a costume for a ceremony; associated as grave goods in a burial
Clay and Stone	Marbles		3	Unknown function	2 made of stone and one made of clay; perfectly spherical; very rare artifact

== Chronology ==
The Fort Wayne mound site reveals evidence of two Late Woodland cultural traditions, the Wayne and Western Basin. The Wayne Tradition is radiocarbon dated to A.D. 750 based on a sample taken from a burial with a Wayne Crosshatched vessel.

A radiocarbon date of A.D. 1159 from a non-burial pit places the Western Basin occupation within the Springwells Phase (approx. A.D. 1100–1250).

Therefore, it appears the building of the Fort Wayne mound, and the time period of the cultures existing here, pre-dates the coming of the Europeans by almost 400 years. It has been suggested that the Detroit area was depopulated after the Wolf Phase (after A.D. 1250) and was a "no-man's land" until the Potawatomi and other tribal groups moved there in historic times.
