= Consulate General of the United States, Jerusalem =

American diplomatic mission to the Palestinians

Consulate General of the United States of America Jerusalem
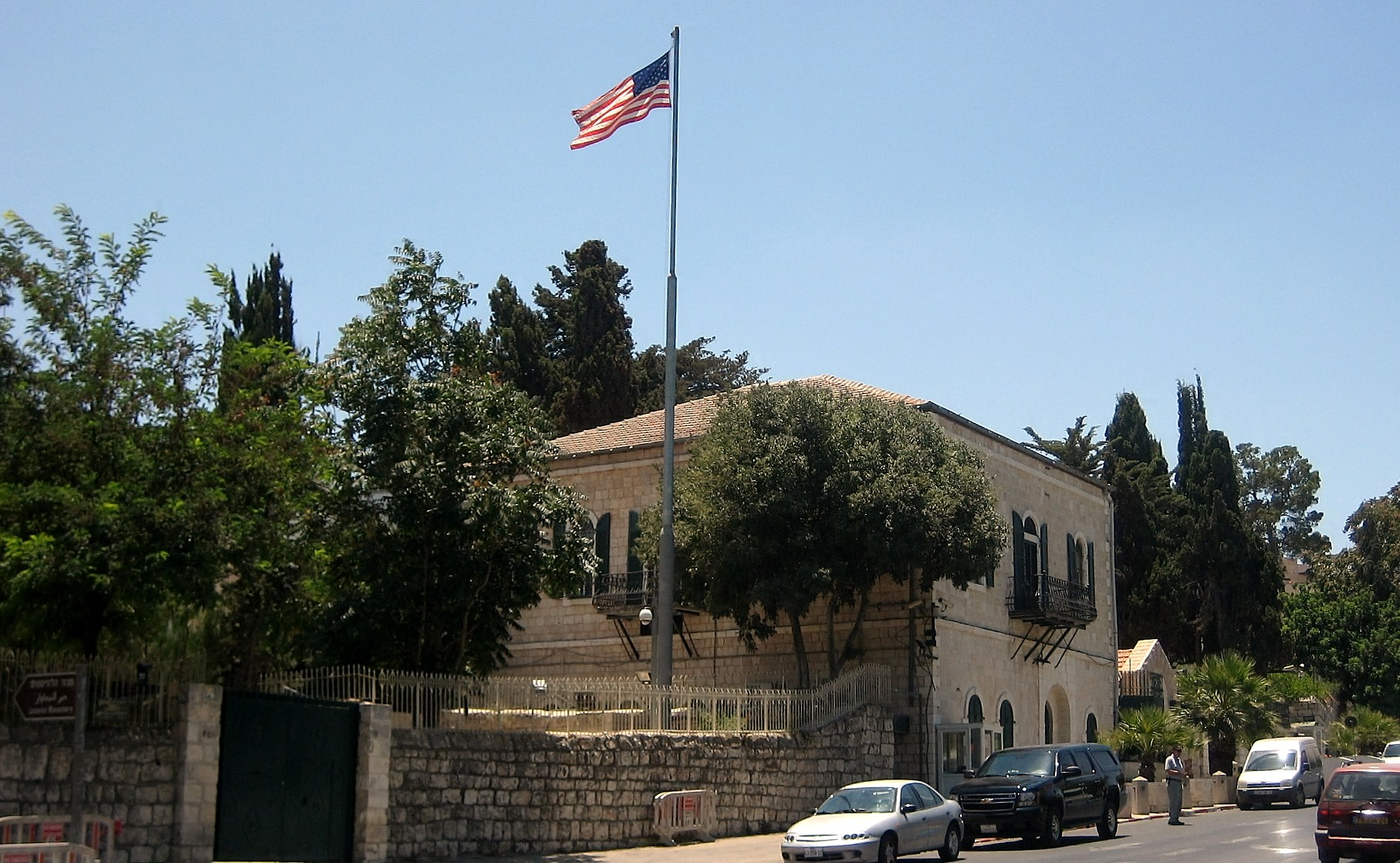
- The Consulate-General's former Gershon Agron Street premises
- Interactive map of Consulate General of the United States of America Jerusalem
- 31.747816°N 35.224632°E
- Location: 18, Gershon Agron Street, Jerusalem

The Consulate General of the United States in Jerusalem was a diplomatic mission of the United States of America that provided consular services to Palestinian residents in Jerusalem, the West Bank and Gaza. It was not accredited to any government. In May 2018, the United States relocated its Tel Aviv embassy to Jerusalem, and in mid-October 2018, U.S. Secretary of State Mike Pompeo announced that the consulate general would be merged with the new US Embassy in Jerusalem and that relations with the Palestinians would be conducted through a special Palestinian Affairs Unit inside the embassy. On 4 March 2019, the consulate general was merged into the US Embassy and formally ceased operations. In May 2021, U.S. Secretary of State Antony Blinken announced that Washington will reopen the consulate, without specifying a date. In September 2021, Palestinian Authority Prime Minister Mohammad Shtayyeh called on the US administration to speed up the reopening of the consulate general in Jerusalem to handle direct contacts with the Palestinians.

== History ==
The U.S. consulate first opened in 1844 in the Old City, inside Jaffa Gate, in what is now the Swedish Christian Study Center. In the late 19th century, the consulate moved to a site on the Street of the Prophets. In 1912, it moved to Gershon Agron Street, in present-day West Jerusalem. The main building, one of the first houses built outside the Old City walls, was constructed in 1868 by Ferdinand Vester, a German Lutheran missionary. A third story was added later. On 23 May 1948, the Consul General, Thomas C. Wasson, was assassinated. In 1952, the consulate leased a second building which provided American citizen and visa services on Nablus Road, East Jerusalem.

=== Trump Administration and US Embassy ===
On 14 May 2018, the new embassy of the United States in Jerusalem opened on a small part of the Arnona site of the Jerusalem Consulate General, and became the new diplomatic mission of the United States to the State of Israel, replacing the former embassy of the United States in Tel Aviv. Of the 1,000 employees at the Tel Aviv embassy, about 50 transferred to the Jerusalem embassy.

The Consulate General continued to operate as an independent mission from its historic Agron Road site. The opening of the Jerusalem Embassy took place on the 70th anniversary of the formation of modern Israel. Palestinians protested the relocation at the border, during which more than 40 Palestinians demonstrators were killed.

=== Merger into US Embassy ===
On 18 October 2018, the U.S. Secretary of State Mike Pompeo announced that the US would be merging the US Consulate General with the newly-relocated US Embassy in Jerusalem into a single mission. Pompeo also announced that the US would continue to conduct its reporting, outreach and program in the Palestinian Territories through a new Palestinian Affairs Unit inside the US Embassy in Jerusalem. This unit will operate from the Agron Road site in Jerusalem. While the announcement was welcomed by the Israeli Government, Palestinian officials accused the Trump Administration for supporting Israel's claim to Jerusalem.

On 19 February 2019, it was reported that the US Consulate General would be merging into the US Embassy in March 2019. On 4 March 2019, the functions of the consulate general were merged into the US Embassy and the consulate general ceased operating, ending the US practice of having separate diplomatic missions to the Israelis and Palestinians. The former Consulate General's Agron Road building was renamed the Palestinian Affairs Unit, to carry out many of the former Consulate General's functions. The last Consul-General was Karen Sasahara.

In response to the Consulate General's merger into the US Embassy, Saeb Erekat, the secretary-general of the PLO's Executive Committee urged the international community to boycott the new Palestinian Affairs Unit. Meanwhile, fellow Executive Committee member Hanan Ashrawi called the closure of the Consulate General "an assault on Palestinian rights and identity."

=== Reopening ===
In May 2021, U.S. Secretary of State Antony Blinken in the Biden administration announced that Washington will reopen the consulate, without specifying a date. In September 2021, Palestinian Authority Prime Minister Mohammad Shtayyeh called on the US administration to speed up the reopening of the consulate general in Jerusalem to handle direct contacts with the Palestinians.

In June 2022, the United States Government redesignated the Palestinian Affairs Unit (PUA) as the U.S. Office of Palestinian Affairs (OPA). While the OPA is still considered part of the US Embassy in Jerusalem, it reports directly to the State Department's Bureau of Near Eastern Affairs.

== Location ==
The US Consulate General was located on 18 Gershon Agron Street and once operated a consular section on 14 David Flusser Street, Arnona in West Jerusalem. Until 2010, citizen and visa services operated out of the building at 27 Nablus Road in East Jerusalem. In October 2010, consular services were moved to a new building complex (just east of the Arnona neighborhood of West Jerusalem) bisected by the Green Line and thus partly in what was defined in 1949 as No Man's Land.

On May 14, 2018, the new US Embassy in Jerusalem moved into the Arnona consular section annex compound of the Jerusalem Consulate General which continued to exist. The space now houses the Ambassador and a small staff. The Ambassador splits his time between the two locations. The remaining embassy functions are to be conducted out of the former Tel Aviv Embassy now officially referred to as a branch office of the embassy. Most consular functions of the still previous consulate now operate under Embassy authority. The embassy compound is located on a parcel of land that straddles the unsettled boundary Green Line into a No Man's Land so designated at the 1949 armistice agreement between Jordan and Israel that ended the 1948 Arab-Israeli war.

== List of Consuls ==
- Warder Cresson, 1844-1848
- vacant, 1848-1857
- John Warren Gorham, 1857-1860
- William R. Page, 1860-1861
- Franklin Olcott, 1861-1862
- Isaac Van Eltten, 1863
- Albert Rhodes, 1863-1864
- Victor Beauboucher, 1865-1866
- Richard Beardsley, 1870-1873
- Frank S. DeHass, 1873-1877
- Joseph G. Wilson, 1877-1882
- Selah Merrill, 1882-1885
- Nageeb Arbeely, 1885-1886
- Henry Gillman, 1886-1891
- Selah Merrill, 1891-1893
- Edwin S. Wallace, 1893-1898
- Selah Merrill, 1898-1907
- Thomas R. Wallace, 1907-1910
- William Coffin, 1910-1913
- Otis A. Glazebrook, 1914-1920
- Oscar S. Heizer, 1920-Sep. 1928
- Paul Knabenshue, Sep. 1928-1930
- Cyril Thiel, 1932
- Ely Palmer, 1933-1935
- George Wadsworth, III, 1935-1940
- Lowell Pinkerton, 1941-1945
- Robert Macatee, 1946-1948
- Thomas C. Wasson, 1948
- William C. Burdette (acting), May-June 1948
- John J. MacDonald, June-October 1948
- William C. Burdette, October 1948-1949
- Raleigh A. Gibson, 1949-1950
- Roger S. Tyler Jr., 1951-July 1954
- William Edward Cole Jr., July 1954-August 1957
- Albert Franklin, 1957-1960
- Eric Wendelin, 1960-1962
- William L. Hamilton Jr., 1962-1964
- Evan M. Wilson, 1964-1967
- Stephen Campbell, 1967-1971
- Arthur R. Day, 1972-1975
- Michael H. Newlin, 1975-1980
- Brandon Grove, 1980-1982
- Wat T. Cluverius IV, 1983-1985
- Morris Draper, Feb. 1986-1988
- Philip C. Wilcox Jr., 1988-1991
- Molly Williamson, 1991-1993
- Edward Abington Jr., 1993-1997
- John E. Herbst, 1998-2000
- Ronald L. Schlicher, 2000-2002
- Jeffrey D. Feltman, 2002-2003
- David D. Pearce, 2003-2005
- Jacob Walles, 2005-2009
- Daniel Rubinstein, 2009-2012
- Michael Ratney, 2012-2015
- Donald Blome, 2015-2018
- Karen Sasahara, 2018-2019

== See also ==
- Israel–United States relations
- Palestine–United States relations
- Embassy of the United States, Jerusalem
- Tel Aviv Branch Office of the Embassy of the United States
- U.S. Office of Palestinian Affairs
- List of diplomatic missions of the United States
- List of consulates-general in Jerusalem
