= Arnona =

Neighborhood in southern Jerusalem

Arnona ארנונה
- Neighborhood
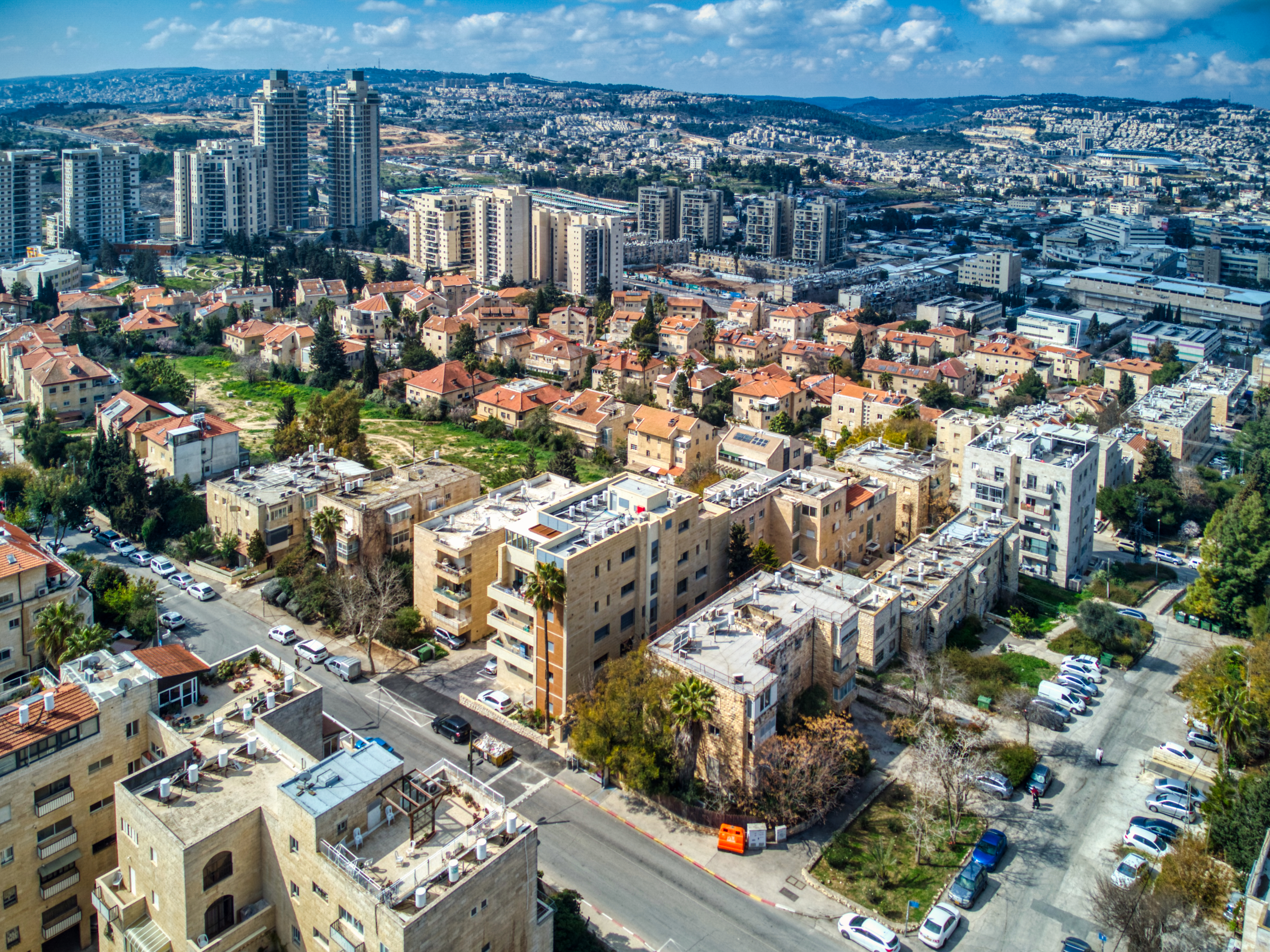
- Arnona, February 2023

- Location in Jerusalem
- City: Jerusalem
- Established: 1931
- Elevation: 800 m (2,625 ft)

Arnona may also refer to Israeli property tax

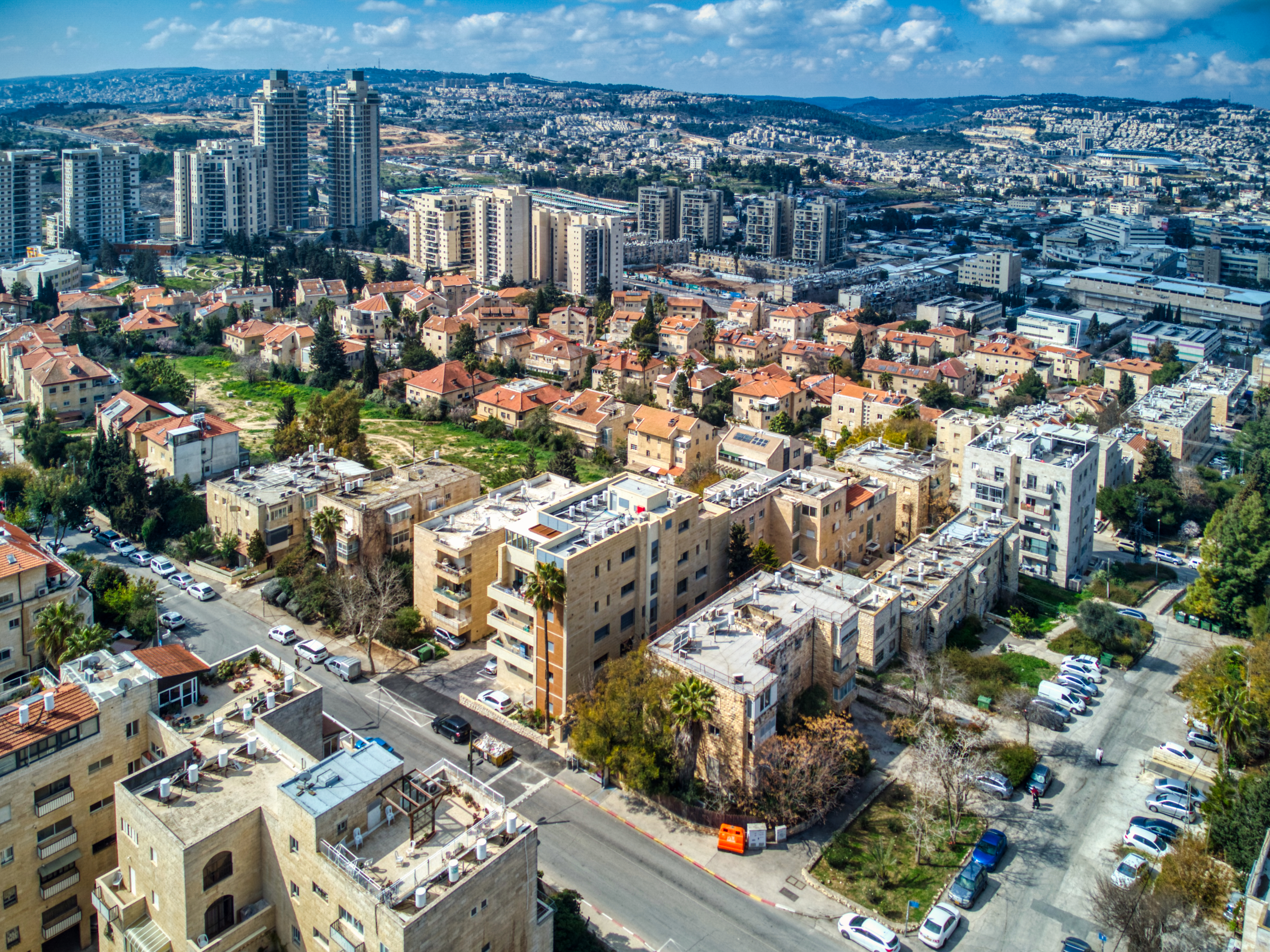
Arnona, February 2023

Arnona (Hebrew: ארנונה) is a neighborhood in southern Jerusalem, situated between the neighborhood of (North) Talpiot and kibbutz Ramat Rachel.

Today Arnona and Talpiot are used interchangeably with no real distinction between them.

== Etymology ==
The most common explanation for the neighborhood's name is its view of the biblical River Arnon, now Wadi Mujib in Jordan, running from the Moab Hills to the Dead Sea.

According to The Jerusalem Post, Arnona takes its name from the baby girl of Ben Zion and Yehudit Luria, one of the neighborhood's first residents. They named their child for Nahal Arnon, a stream visible from the nearby hills and the community decided to use it as the name for the whole neighborhood. Arnona Luria married Micha Faykess, a commander of the Israeli forces in 1967. A main street in Arnona, Rehov Hamifaked, is named for him.

== Geography ==
Arnona is one of the highest points in Jerusalem at 800 meters above sea level. From Arnona one can see the Judean Desert, the Dead Sea, and, as mentioned, the River Arnon/Wadi Mujib. The neighborhood is bordered by the Hebron Road/Derech Hevron and Talpiot neighbourhood to the west, Kibbutz Ramat Rachel to the south, Old Talpiot to the north, and the Judean desert to the east.

== History ==
=== Antiquity ===
In 2020, the remains of a large Iron Age II compound were discovered in Arnona near the US Embassy. The site served for the collection and storage of taxes in the form of agricultural produce, and was first used during the reign of two biblical kings of Judah, Hezekiah and Manasseh (together they ruled from c. 715–643). According to the Israel Antiquities Authority, the archaeological discoveries identify it as a highly important site in the history of the Kingdom of Judah in its final days and subsequent return to Zion.

=== Mandate Palestine ===
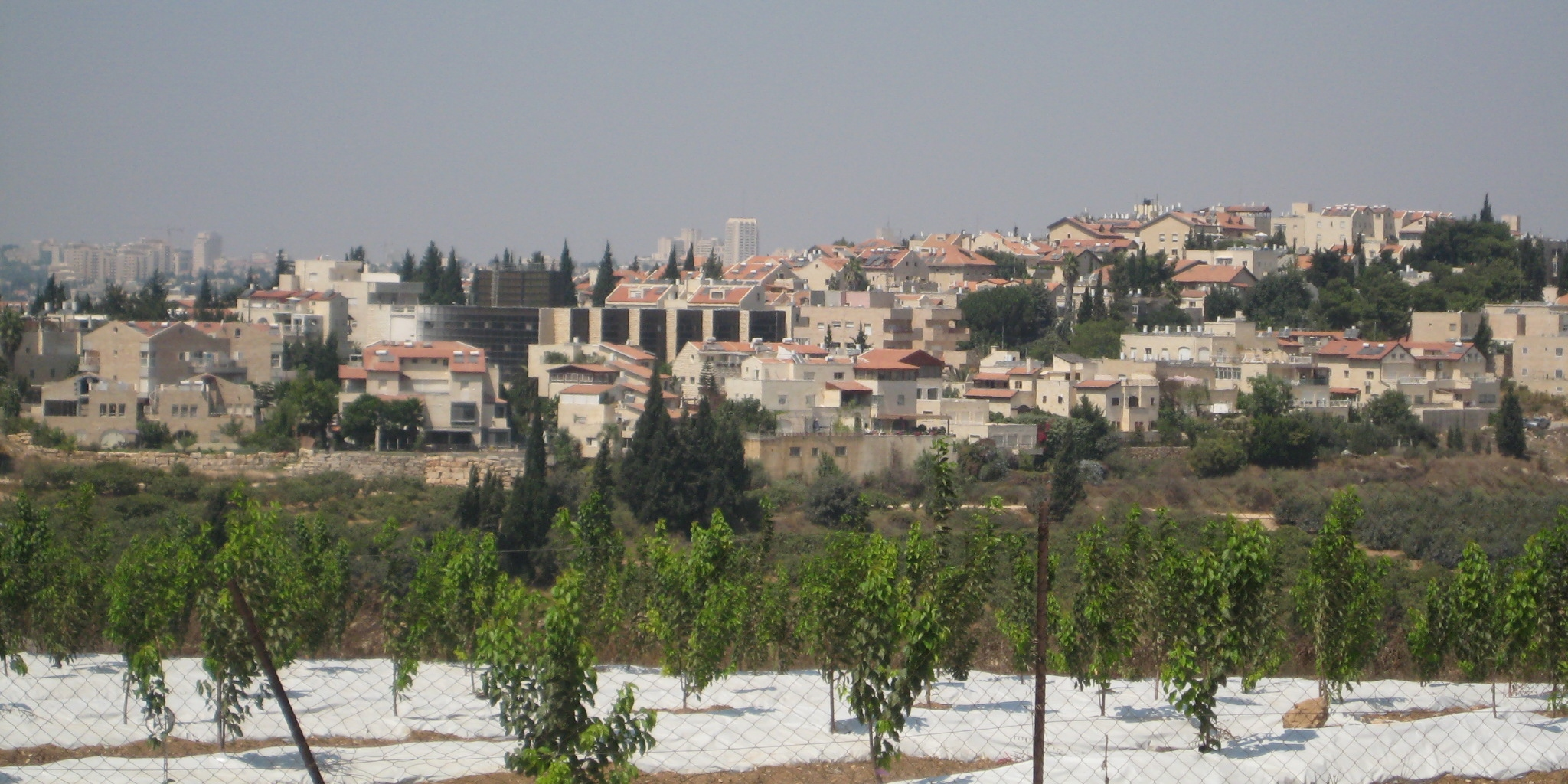
Arnona, view from Ramat Rachel

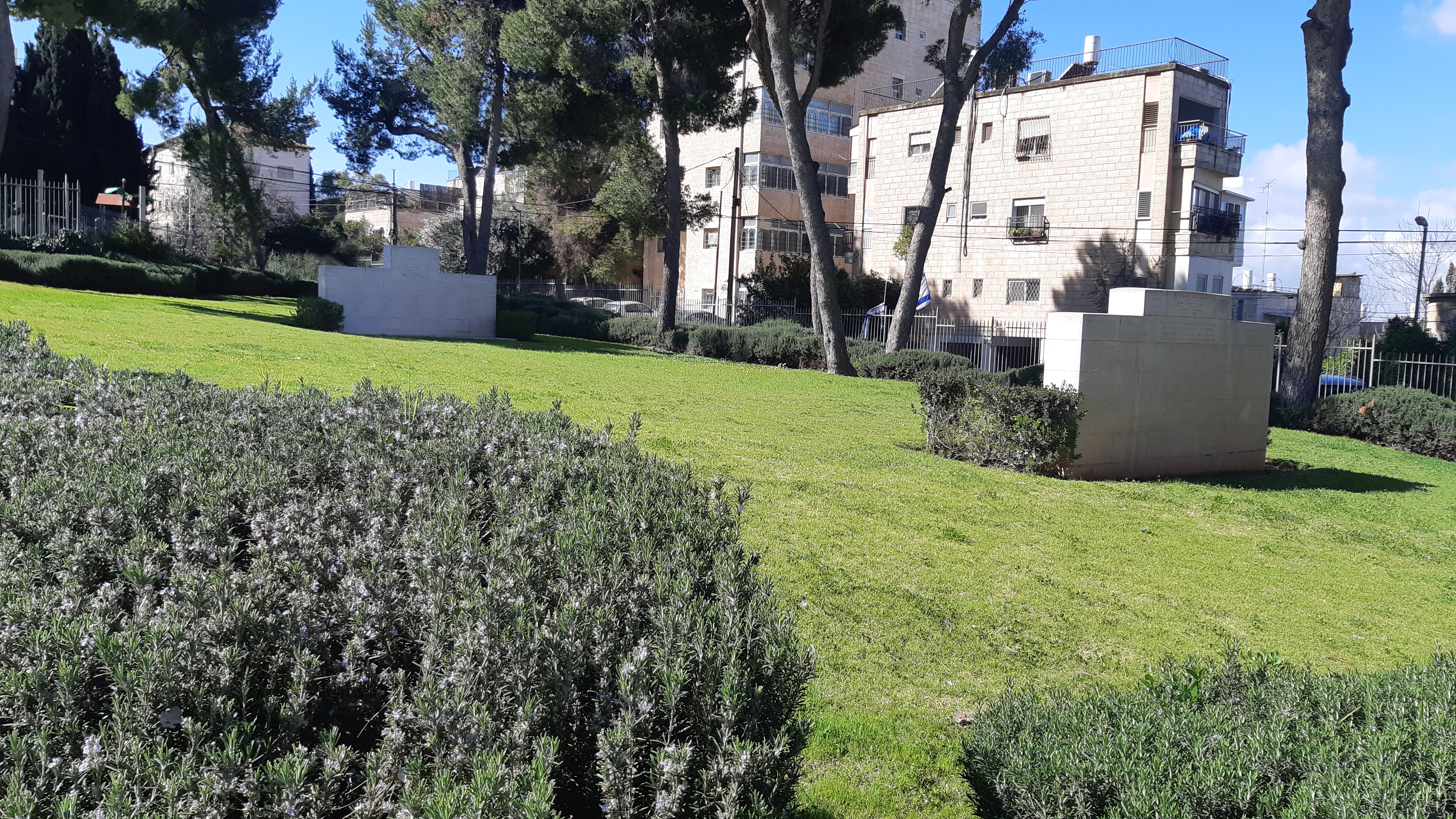
Indian cemetery established in 1918

Arnona was founded in 1931 on land owned by the Keren HaEzra company. Blueprints for the neighborhood were drawn up by the architect Richard Kauffmann. In 1935, another neighbourhood named "Binyan v’Melacha" (Hebrew: בנין ומלאכה, Building and Craft) was founded alongside Talpiot; this neighborhood has since been incorporated into the Arnona area.

During the 1948 Arab-Israeli War, Arnona was on the front line against Transjordan. In May 1948, Arnona was occupied by Arab forces. An attack by Egyptian, Jordanian, and local Arab troops led to a retreat by Jewish forces from Arnona and Ramat Rachel. A combined unit of the Hagana and Palmach later retook the area.

The 1949 cease fire agreement with Jordan placed the cease-fire line at the eastern border of Arnona. This cease fire line was part of the "Kav Ironi", the Jerusalem section of the Green line separating the Jordanian and Israeli armies. The border was patrolled by a dedicated force, but the only physical barrier was an unguarded barbed-wire fence. With the Six-Day War in 1967, Arnona gained its current borders.

=== State of Israel ===
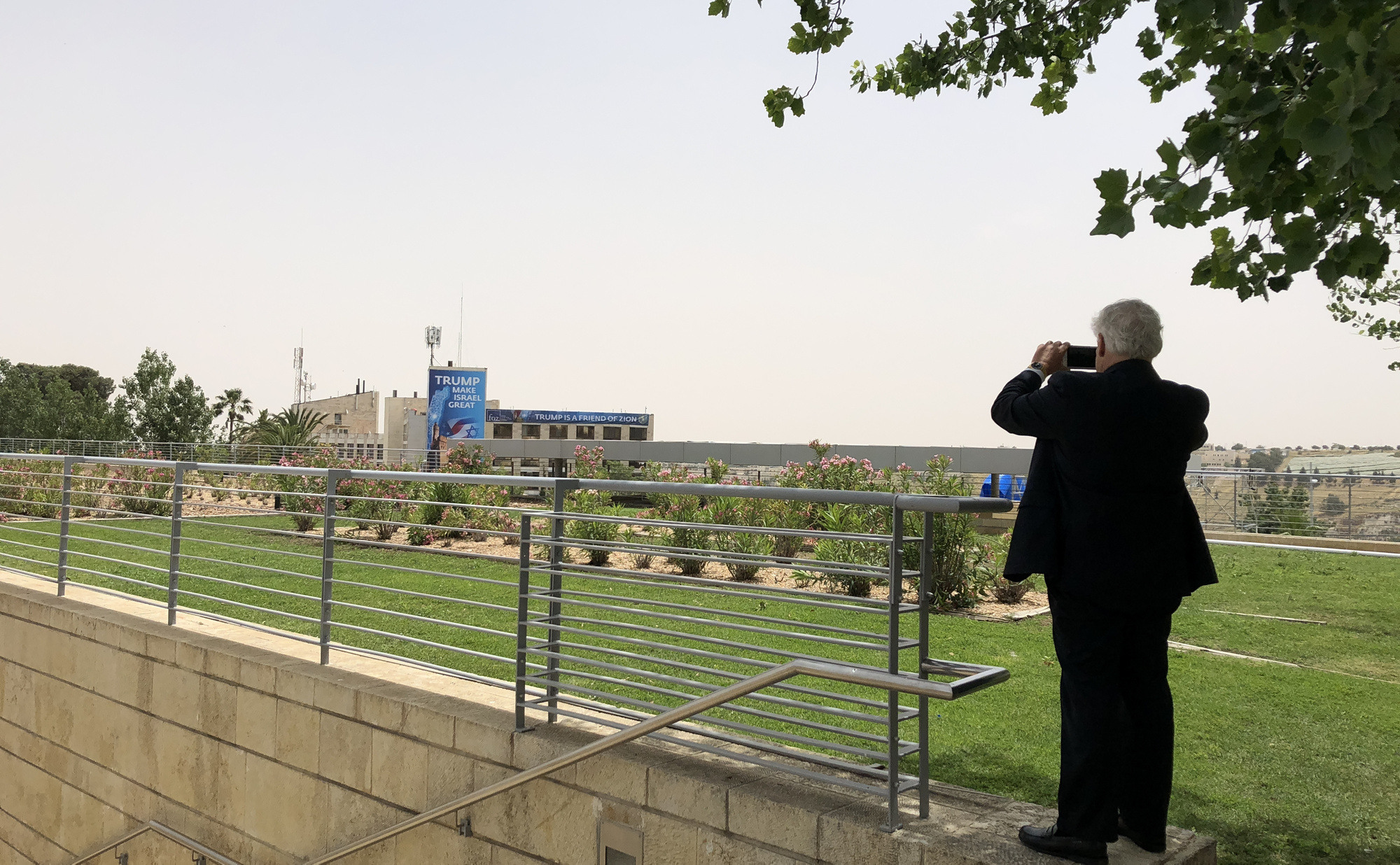
U.S. Embassy in Arnona

The United States Embassy to Israel moved to Arnona on May 14, 2018. Previously, the building had been designated as the US Consulate General in Jerusalem. On February 23, 2018, the Trump administration announced that the United States Embassy to Israel would relocate to the Arnona premises of the Consulate General by May 14 to coincide with the 70th anniversary of the Israeli Declaration of Independence.

== Landmarks ==
In the middle of the neighborhood is a British Mandate cemetery for Indian soldiers who fought with the British army in World War I. Muslims are buried in one section, while Hindus and Sikhs are buried in another. 290 Turkish soldiers who died as prisoners of war in September and October 1918 are buried in a separate section.

== Notable residents ==
- Shmuel Yosef Agnon, winner of the Nobel Prize in Literature
- Nitzan Chen, journalist, author and former Government Press Office director
- Galila Ron-Feder Amit, Israeli children books author
