= United States Office of Palestinian Affairs =

- Location: Jerusalem
- Address: 18 Agron Road; Jerusalem 9419003
- Coordinates: 31°44′52″N 35°13′29″E
- Website: palestinianaffairs.state.gov

The United States Office of Palestinian Affairs (OPA), formerly the Palestinian Affairs Unit (PAU), was an office located in the United States Embassy to the State of Israel in Jerusalem but reported directly and independently to the United States Department of State. It was charged with contacts with the Palestinian Authority and with issues related to the Palestinians in the West Bank and the Gaza Strip.

The final acting chief of the United States Office of Palestinian Affairs was Lourdes Lamela.

== History ==
On March 4, 2019, the United States Consulate General in Jerusalem was closed down as part of President Donald Trump's policy of recognizing Jerusalem as Israel's capital. Palestinian affairs were transferred to the responsibility of the United States Embassy in Jerusalem and placed under the newly created Palestinian Affairs Unit (PAU).

Following the United States presidential elections of 2020, United States foreign policy towards the Palestinian Authority shifted once more. On June 9, 2022, as President Joe Biden was interested in removing relations with the Palestinian Authority from the schedule of the United States Embassy in Jerusalem, he created the United States Office of Palestinian Affairs (OPA) under the United States Department of State. The office itself was located within the same building as the Embassy in Jerusalem, but reported to the United States Department of State in Washington independently.

The second Trump administration shut down the office on May 16, 2025, and moved the handling of Palestinian affairs to the United States ambassador to Israel, Mike Huckabee.

== List of chiefs ==
No.	Portrait	Chief	Term start	Term end
1		Mike Hankey	March 4, 2019	August 1, 2020
2		George Noll	August 1, 2020	August 24, 2024
3		Hans Wechsel	August 24, 2024	March 31, 2025
–		Lourdes Lamela; Acting	April 1, 2025	May 16, 2025

== See also ==
- Palestine–United States relations
- Consulate General of the United States, Jerusalem
