= Evan M. Wilson =

American Diplomat (1910-1984)

Evan Morris Wilson (1910–1984) was an American diplomat who served mostly in the Middle East.

== Diplomatic career ==
Wilson started working for the Department of State in 1937. He served as Vice Consul in Guadalajara, Mexico, 1937–1938. He served in several positions in the US Embassy in Egypt in 1938–1941. He was a member of the Anglo-American Committee of Inquiry on Palestine in 1945–1946. He also served as Assistant Chief of the Division of Near Eastern Affairs in 1946–1947. He held several positions at the US Embassy in Iran in 1947–1949. He served as Counselor of the Embassy in Lebanon in 1961–1964. He served as US Consul General in Jerusalem in 1964–1967. Wilson retired from the diplomatic service in 1967 and in his remaining years worked as a scholar on Middle Eastern diplomacy. His last diplomatic assignment coincided with the Six-Day War.

He died in 1984.

== Personal life ==
In 1935, Wilson married Leila, and they remained married till his death in 1984. They had one daughter.

== Works ==
- Decision on Palestine: How the U.S. Came to Recognize Israel (Stanford: Hoover Institution, Stanford University, 1979)
