= Paul Knabenshue =

American foreign service officer

Paul Knabenshue (1883 – February 1, 1942) was an American career foreign service officer.

Knabenshue was the United States Consul at Beirut, Syria (1919–1928) and Consul General at Jerusalem (1928-1930). He was also Minister Resident/Consul General to Iraq from 1932 until his recess appointment expired on March 4, 1933. He was appointed again two weeks later and died at a post on February 1, 1942 from natural causes. He was the first resident minister consulate general there was raised the previous year to a legation.

Knabenshue was known for his strong pro-British sentiments. He closely aligned with British policies and often deferred to British guidance in his diplomatic activities.

In 1941, Knabenshue was concluding a thirty-five-year diplomatic career. He had served as the American consul in Cairo, Beirut, and Jerusalem before becoming Minister to Iraq in 1932, the pinnacle of his career. He died in Iraq from natural causes in 1942. As the chief U.S. official in Iraq, the State Department relied heavily on his reports, having few other information sources. However, unbeknownst to the State Department, Knabenshue was entirely reliant on British intelligence and the British embassy for his assessments of Iraqi politics. This dependence led him to disregard Iraqi national aspirations and Arab nationalism. A strong Anglophile, Knabenshue often followed the lead of the British ambassador in Baghdad, initially Sir Basil Newton and later Sir Kinahan Cornwallis. Unlike other American diplomats in the region, Knabenshue rarely sought information beyond British sources and was notably cooperative with the British. He seemed oblivious to the manipulation of the British embassy by pro-British Iraqi politicians and intelligence agents. At the British embassy's behest, Knabenshue avoided contact with Iraqi opposition figures, Arab nationalists, and Palestinian exiles. This isolation further increased his reliance on British officials for his political assessments. Consequently, his reports to the State Department dismissed Iraqi anti-British sentiment, attributing it solely to German propaganda, and asserted that most Iraqis favored continued British involvement in their country.
