= Thomas C. Wasson =

American diplomat; assassinated while serving as Consul General in Jerusalem (1948)

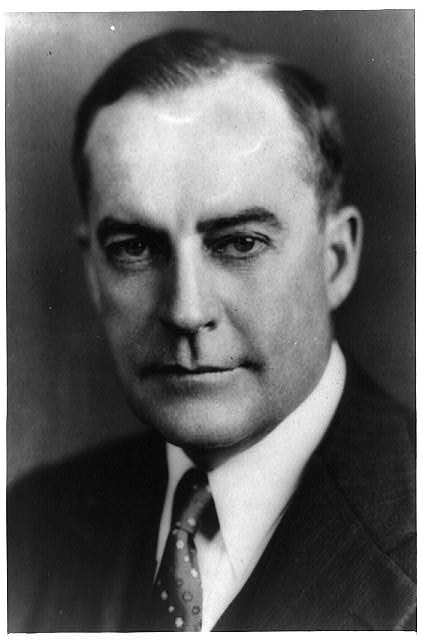
Thomas C. Wasson

Thomas Campbell Wasson (February 8, 1896 – May 23, 1948) was an American diplomat who was assassinated while serving as the Consul General for the United States in Jerusalem. He was also a member of the United Nations Truce Commission.

== Biography ==
Wasson was born February 8, 1896, in Great Falls, Montana, and raised in Newark, New Jersey. From 1926 to 1929, he served as the United States Vice Consul in Melbourne, Australia. In 1932, he was Vice Consul in Puerto Cortes, Honduras, and in 1938, became the Consul in Lagos, Nigeria. In April 1948, Wasson was appointed as the Consul General for the US in Jerusalem.

In a dispatch on May 18, 1948, Wasson reported that "looting in the captured Arab areas has now been so widespread and has been regarded with such indifference by the authorities that it is difficult not to think it is officially tolerated."

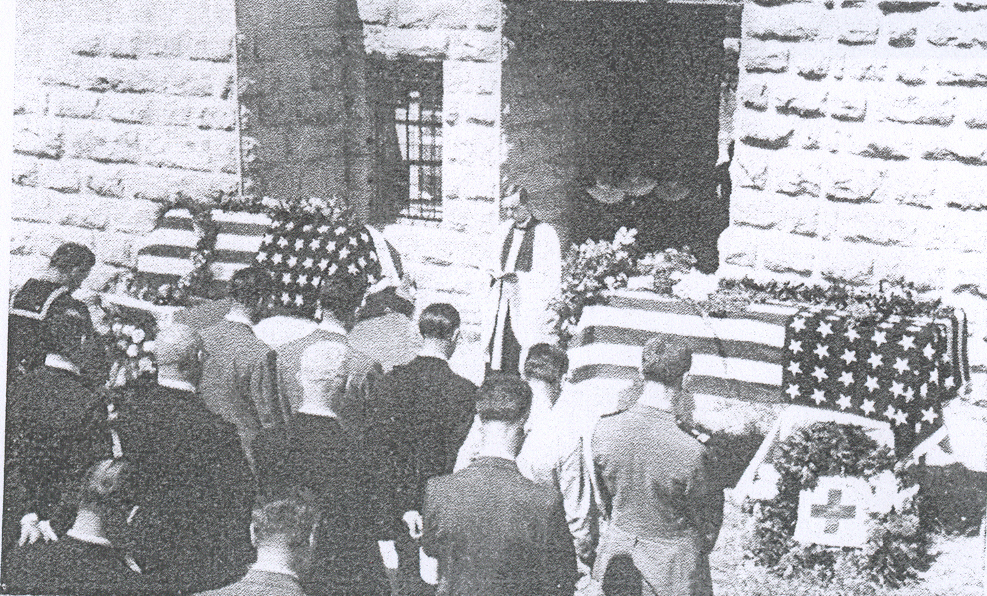
Funeral of Thomas C. Wasson and US Naval Officer Herbert C. Walker, Santa Maria Convent of the Sisters of the Holy Rosary, Jerusalem, May 1948; photo taken by John Roy Carlson

On May 19, 1948, The Scotsman quoted a report by Wasson saying the British Consul had a "narrow escape" when the consulate came under gunfire. On May 22, it was reported that Wasson had attempted to stop the Arab Legion shelling of the Hadassah Hospital and Hebrew University on Mount Scopus: "The American Consul is reported to have contacted the Legion requesting it to stop firing on Jewish positions in and around the buildings. The Legion's commander replied that the buildings were being used by Jewish forces to mortar and machine-gun the Arab-occupied Sheikh Jarrah quarter and handed the Consul surrender terms to convey to the Jews. The commander asked that all fighting Jews in the hospital and university surrender as prisoners of war and that all doctors, nurses, professors, and scientists be handed over to the Red Cross."

Later the same day, just after 2:00pm, Wasson was shot while returning to the US Consulate from a meeting of the UN Truce Commission at the French Consulate in Jerusalem. While crossing Wauchope Street (now Abraham Lincoln/Hess) to enter the alley leading to the consulate, he was shot by a .30 caliber rifle. The bullet entered his chest via his right upper arm and left level to his second costal cartilage. Wasson died the following day.

Wasson's funeral was described by the American journalist Arthur Derounian (John Roy Carlson) in his book Cairo to Damascus.

Wasson was replaced by Vice-Consul William Burdette. Wasson's body was returned to the United States and interred at Washington National Cathedral.

== Dispute about shooter ==
The shooter was never identified. In the aftermath of the killing, there were contradictory reports on whether the gun was fired by an Arab or Jew. The New York Times reported on May 23 that Wasson "on his death bed stated that Arabs had shot him," but retracted the statement two weeks later. On May 25, The Scotsman newspaper quoted an Israeli government statement that Wasson "was killed by Arab bullets." According to The New York Post on June 8, sources in Amman claimed Wasson was shot by the Israelis, but that this was contradicted by Wasson's alleged last words in hospital. The Post report claimed that an American government document stated that his dying words, to the Jewish nurses at his bedside, were that he had been shot by Arabs.

In the first edition of her book Our Jerusalem, a history of the American Colony in Jerusalem, Bertha Spafford Vester quotes her diary entry for May 23, 1948: "Our American Consul, Mr. Robert [sic] Wasson was shot by Jews on Friday and died today." (Note: Spafford Vester's diary entry for May 23, 1948, actually says: "We heard today the U.S. Consul General Mr. Robert [sic] Wasson was shot by Jews on Friday and died today. What a terrible crime! He was going from the French Consulate to the American." (Underscoring in original). Spafford Vester's diary for May 23, 1948, is in box II:21 of the US Library of Congress' American Colony in Jerusalem collection)

In his account, published in 1960, the Military Governor of Jerusalem, Dov Yosef, wrote that Wasson "was shot on 22 May by an Arab sniper."

== Diplomatic reports ==
On April 15, 1948, in a report concerning the Hadassah Hospital Convoy Massacre, Wasson wrote, "American correspondent eye witnessed removal from trucks large quantities arms and ammunition and speculated whether for escort or other purpose."

On April 17, 1948, he wrote: "… queried as to whether convoy included armoured cars, Haganah guards, arms and ammunition in addition to doctors, nurses and patients, Kohn [of the Jewish Agency] replied in affirmative saying it was necessary to protect convoy."

On May 18, 1948, Wasson wrote: "Looting in the captured Arab areas has now been so widespread and has been regarded with such indifference by the authorities that it is difficult not to think it is officially tolerated."
