= Henry Gillman =

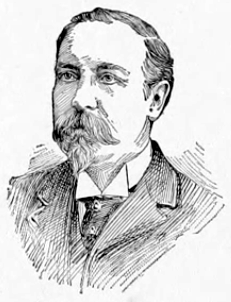
- Born: November 16, 1833; Kinsale, Ireland
- Died: July 30, 1915 (aged 81); Detroit, Michigan, United States
- Occupations: Ethnologist, curator

Henry Gillman (November 16, 1833 – July 30, 1915) was an ethnologist, curator for the Detroit Scientific Society, a librarian at the Detroit Public Library, and later he was affiliated with Harvard University's Peabody Museum of Archaeology and Ethnology. Early in his career he was a survey assistant for the U.S. Department of War and made charts of many Michigan locations. He also served as the assistant superintendent of construction for the tenth and eleventh lighthouse districts.

== Biography ==
Henry Gillman was born in Kinsale, Ireland on November 16, 1833.

In 1876, Gillman, working with the Peabody Museum and with the permission of the U.S. government, excavated the remains of the Fort Wayne burial mound. His findings were published in a report and the artifacts were given to the Peabody Museum. He had opened other mounds around Detroit and the River Rouge areas as well.

He served as consul of the United States to Jerusalem from 1886 to 1891.

He died in Detroit on July 30, 1915.

== Selected bibliography ==
- Gillman, Henry. "The Mound-Builders in Michigan." Michigan Pioneer and Historical Society, Collections 2 (1880): 40–52.

Article read before the annual meeting of the Pioneer Society, 1877.
Also available at Pure Michigan.com.

- Gillman, Henry. "Peculiarities of the Femora from tumuli in Michigan," "Some Observations on the Orbits of the Mound Crania," and "Investigation of the Burial Mound at Fort Wayne on the Detroit River, Michigan." Proceedings of the American Association for the Advancement of Science 25 (1877): 300–324.
- Gillman, Henry. "Certain Characteristics Pertaining to Ancient Man in Michigan." Miscellaneous Documents of the Senate of the United States, 1st sess., 44th Cong. (1876), 234–245.
- Gillman, Henry. "The Ancient Men of the Great Lakes." Proceedings of the American Association for the Advancement of Science 25 (1876): 316–331.
- He also gave a similar report of his mound-builders in the Annual Report of the Smithsonian Institution for 1873. See The mound-builders and platycnemism in Michigan Reprinted from Smithsonian report for 1873. "Certain characteristics pertaining to ancient man in Michigan," Reprinted from Smithsonian report for 1875.
- Henry Gillman. "Ancient Works at Isle Royale, Michigan." Appletons' Journal: A Magazine of General Literature 10, no. 229, August 9, 1873, 173–175.
- Henry Gillman. "Hassan : a Fellah : a Romance of Palestine" .The American News Company Publishers' Agents . 1898
