= Palestine–United States relations =

- Palestine: United States

Diplomatic mission
- Permanent Observer Mission of Palestine to the United Nations, New York City: Office of Palestinian Affairs of the Embassy of the United States, Jerusalem

Envoy
- Ambassador to the UN Riyad Mansour (de facto): Ambassador to Israel Mike Huckabee (de facto)

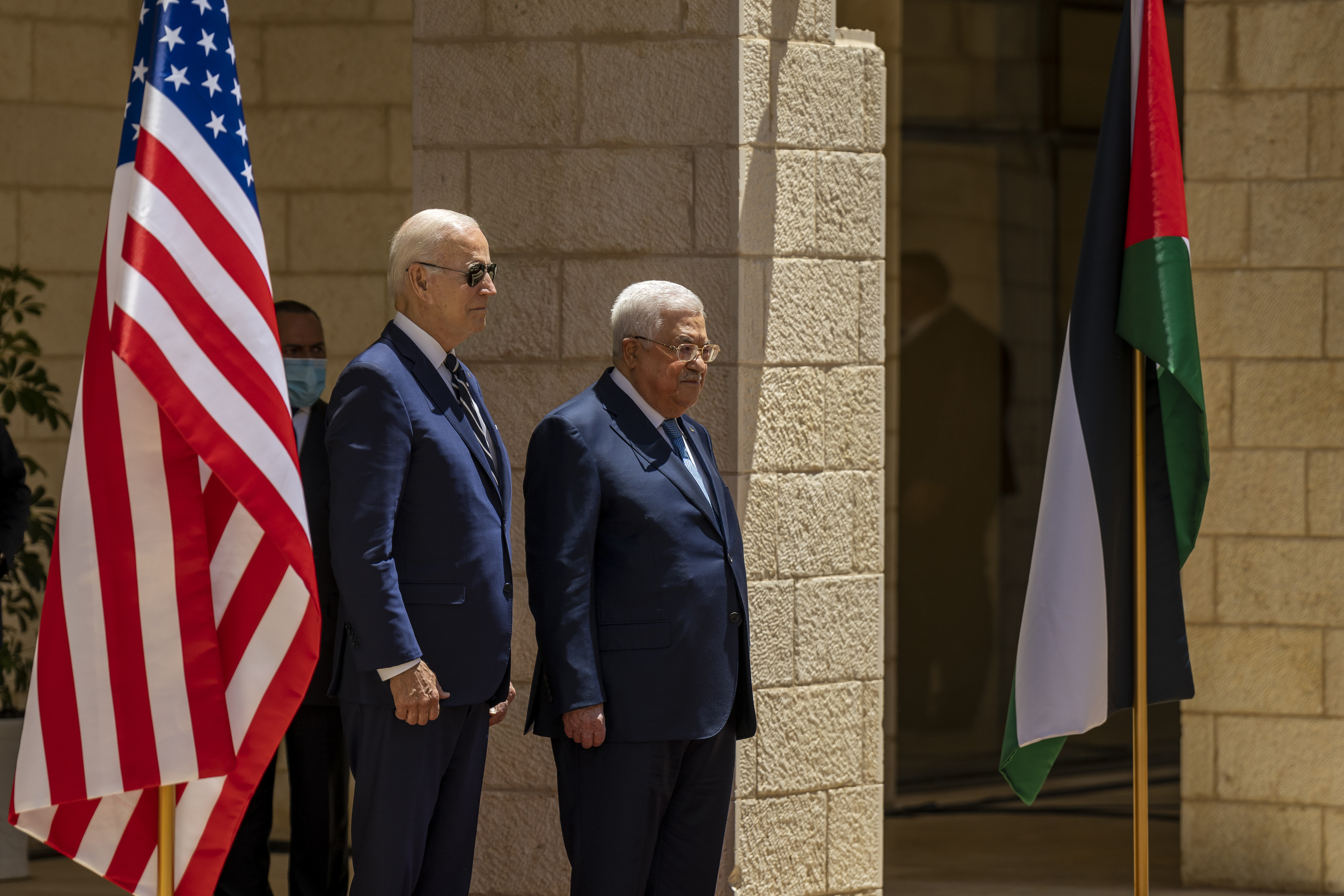
Joe Biden and Mahmoud Abbas at the Palestinian Presidential Palace in Bethlehem on 15 July 2022

Political relations between Palestine and the United States have been complex and strained since the 1960s. While the U.S. does not recognize the State of Palestine, it does recognize the Palestine Liberation Organization (PLO) as the legitimate representative entity for the Palestinian people; following the Oslo Accords, it recognized the Palestinian National Authority as the legitimate Palestinian government of the Palestinian territories.

Due to its non-recognition of Palestine, the U.S. does not maintain any official diplomatic offices in the Palestinian territories nor does it provide consular services to Palestinians, and the Palestinians have had no diplomatic representation in the U.S. since the closure of the PLO mission in Washington, D.C., in October 2018 but is represented in the United States through its mission to the United Nations in New York City which serves as Palestine's de facto embassy. The U.S. designated a "Palestinian Affairs Unit" within its embassy to Israel in Jerusalem for the purpose of handling relations with the PNA, but Palestine is presently maintaining a public policy of non-cooperation with the office and with the U.S. in general. In June 2022, the "Palestinian Affairs Unit" (PAU) was renamed the "United States Office of Palestinian Affairs" and will report directly to Washington "on substantive matters".

Since around 2011, the PLO's diplomatic effort has focused on the campaign known as Palestine 194, which aims to gain full membership for Palestine in the United Nations (UN). Officially, Palestine seeks international recognition based on the pre-1967 borders of Israel, with East Jerusalem as its capital city.

== History ==
The US presence in Palestine began as early as the 19th century. In 1844, the US State Department opened a consulate in Jerusalem, which became the primary point of contact with the local population. In the 19th century, many Americans traveled to the Holy Land for religious or cultural reasons, including Mark Twain. In the 1880s, an American Colony was established in Jerusalem, led by the religious utopian Horatio Spafford.

The PLO, established in 1964, did not receive official recognition from the U.S. government. However, an unofficial PLO Information Office opened in New York in 1964. Sadat Hassan, Permanent Representative of Yemen to the United Nations ran the office until it closed in 1968.

On 1 May 1978, the PLO was allowed to open the Palestine Information Office (PIO) in Washington, D.C. The PIO was registered with the Justice Department as a foreign agent. The 100th United States Congress adopted the Anti-Terrorism Act of 1987, which declared the PLO a terrorist organization, with a consequential ban on assisting it in any way, and the government ordered the closure of the PIO. The PIO appealed to the courts, but their objections were rejected.

In 1988 a presidential waiver was issued to allow contact with the organization. A PLO office was reopened in 1989 as the Palestine Affairs Center. The PLO Mission office in Washington, D.C. was opened in 1994. Following the establishment of the Palestinian National Authority in 1994 under the Oslo Agreement, the PLO office was renamed the PLO Mission to the United States.

On 20 July 2010, the United States Department of State agreed to upgrade the status of the PLO Mission in the United States to "General Delegation of the PLO". The PLO Mission Office was ordered closed in October 2018.

== Foreign policy of the U.S. government ==
=== Nixon and Ford administrations (1969–1977) ===
Before the 1973 Yom Kippur War, the U.S. government considered the PLO and Fatah under Yasser Arafat's leadership as a terrorist organization, and did not support PLO aspirations at the UN. U.S. diplomats in the Middle East were explicitly ordered by the State Department never to make any contacts with Arafat or any representative on his behalf. However, despite the negative view of the PLO, State Department officials began to view the Palestinian factor as crucial enough to be taken into consideration when brokering an Israeli-Jordanian agreement on the West Bank. In contrast to the negative diplomatic view of the PLO, the intelligence community did not refrain from clandestine contacts with that entity, and as early as October 1970, a senior Fatah representative delivered the CIA message about willingness by Arafat to recognize the State of Israel in exchange for US support of a Palestinian state. This trend of clandestine contacts produced some tangible results following the Yom Kippur War. On 3 November 1973, a secret meeting was held in Morocco between deputy director of the CIA Vernon A. Walters and Khaled al-Hassan, number two in the PLO at the time, and the two discussed the possibility of integrating the PLO into the peace process. Even though no tangible agreement was reached at that meeting, it led to the restraint of Fatah attacks on U.S. targets.

From 1974 onward, some circles in the US Department of State were considering accepting the PLO as a partner in the Middle East peace process. In June 1974, U.S. Ambassador to Egypt Herman Eilts assessed that Arafat was looking for ways to integrate the PLO into the peace process. U.S. President Gerald Ford even alluded to that possibility in October 1974. In November 1974, Ford made a non-committal statement on U.S. position towards the PLO saying:

The Israelis have said they will never negotiate with the PLO. We are not a party for any negotiations. I think we have to let the decision as to who will negotiate to be the responsibility of the parties involved.

However, due to U.S. support of the Israeli government Washington agreed in 1975 to demand PLO explicit recognition of the State of Israel as a precondition to any dealing with its representatives. Referring to this, Ford said in November 1975:

the Palestinians do not recognize the State of Israel. And under those circumstances, it is impossible to bring the Palestinians and the Israelis together to negotiate. So, unless there is some change in their attitude, I think you can see a very serious roadblock exists.

As the PLO did not make such recognition explicitly at that time, the U.S. government refrained from any official relations and the PLO was not allowed to maintain any offices in the U.S., except for the PLO Mission to the United Nations, which was immune from U.S. law.

=== Carter administration (1977–1981) ===
A certain change of attitude took place under President Jimmy Carter. Carter was the first U.S. president to advocate the creation of a Palestinian state, which he did in March 1977:

There has to be a homeland provided for the Palestinian refugees who have suffered for many, many years.

In addition to Carter's pro-Palestinian positions, the PLO leadership attempted to reach an agreement with the US government. In January 1978, Arafat delivered a secret message to Carter, stating he would settle for a Palestinian state in the West Bank and Gaza Strip in exchange for US support of that objective. The administration's relatively positive position on the PLO also allowed that organization to establish on 1 May 1978, the Palestine Information Office in Washington, D.C. However, no real progress on the Palestinian issue was made under Carter, as he was preoccupied with reaching an Israeli-Egyptian agreement, and contacts with PLO were detrimental to that agreement.

The PLO assisted in releasing 13 American hostages in November 1979 from Iran, which was a first batch that included women and African Americans.

=== Reagan administration (1981–1989) ===
A harsher stance towards the PLO was taken by President Ronald Reagan. The Republican party platform approved in 1980 stated that:

Republicans reject any call for the involvement of the PLO as not in keeping with the long-term interests of either Israel or the Palestinian Arabs. The imputation of legitimacy to organizations not yet willing to acknowledge the fundamental right to existence of the State of Israel is wrong. [- - -] We believe the establishment of a Palestinian State on the West Bank would be destabilizing and harmful to the peace process.

Reagan continuously opposed the establishment of a Palestinian state or negotiating with the PLO. In September he proposed Palestinian autonomy under Jordanian supervision. Even though the plan did not call for any PLO participation, some PLO circles viewed this as a possible sign that the Reagan administration might consider accommodation with the PLO at a later date.

An attempt to close down the Palestine Information Office was made following the passage of the Anti-Terrorism Act in December 1987. This act proclaimed the PLO a terrorist organization and prohibited all of its activities except for disseminating information. Reagan then stated:

I have no intention of establishing diplomatic relations with the PLO.

The U.S. government attempted to close the Palestine Information Office on grounds that it was involved in terrorist activities, but various courts in the United States ruled against this line of action, but allowed stricter supervision of the office's activities.

Also, Reagan downplayed the outbreak of the Intifada, viewing it an import into the Palestinian territories rather than an expression of the Palestinian popular rebellion.

The Palestine Liberation Organization published the Palestinian Declaration of Independence in November 1988, and accepted United Nations Security Council Resolutions 242 and 338, recognized Israel's right to exist, and renounced terrorism, the US conditions for an open dialogue between the PLO and the U.S. government. Reagan issued a presidential waiver to the Anti-Terrorism Act to allow contact with the PLO.

=== George H. W. Bush administration (1989–1993) ===
The dialogue continued under President George H. W. Bush, but was suspended in June 1990 following PLO refusal to condemn an attempted attack on the Israeli coastline by the Palestinian Liberation Front.

In addition, relations strained after PLO leader Arafat supported Iraq's Saddam Hussein, even after Iraq invaded Kuwait and during the 1991 Gulf War. When asked at a press conference immediately after the Gulf War about a possible dialog with the PLO, Bush stated:

To me, they've lost credibility. They've lost credibility with this office right here. And the reason they have is that they behaved very badly to those of their own fundamental faith.

However, the Bush administration made efforts throughout 1991 to convene a general Middle East peace conference. In a news conference in early August, Bush stated:

In the Middle East, we're close to convening a conference this October that will launch direct talks among Israel, the Palestinians, and the Arab States. I welcome Prime Minister Shamir's statement that he supports our proposal, and I call upon Israel and the Palestinians to clear away remaining obstacles and seize this truly historic opportunity for peace.

Bush's efforts culminated in the Madrid Peace Conference in October 1991, which for the first time accepted an official Palestinian delegation, even though without open PLO participation.

=== Clinton administration (1993–2001) ===
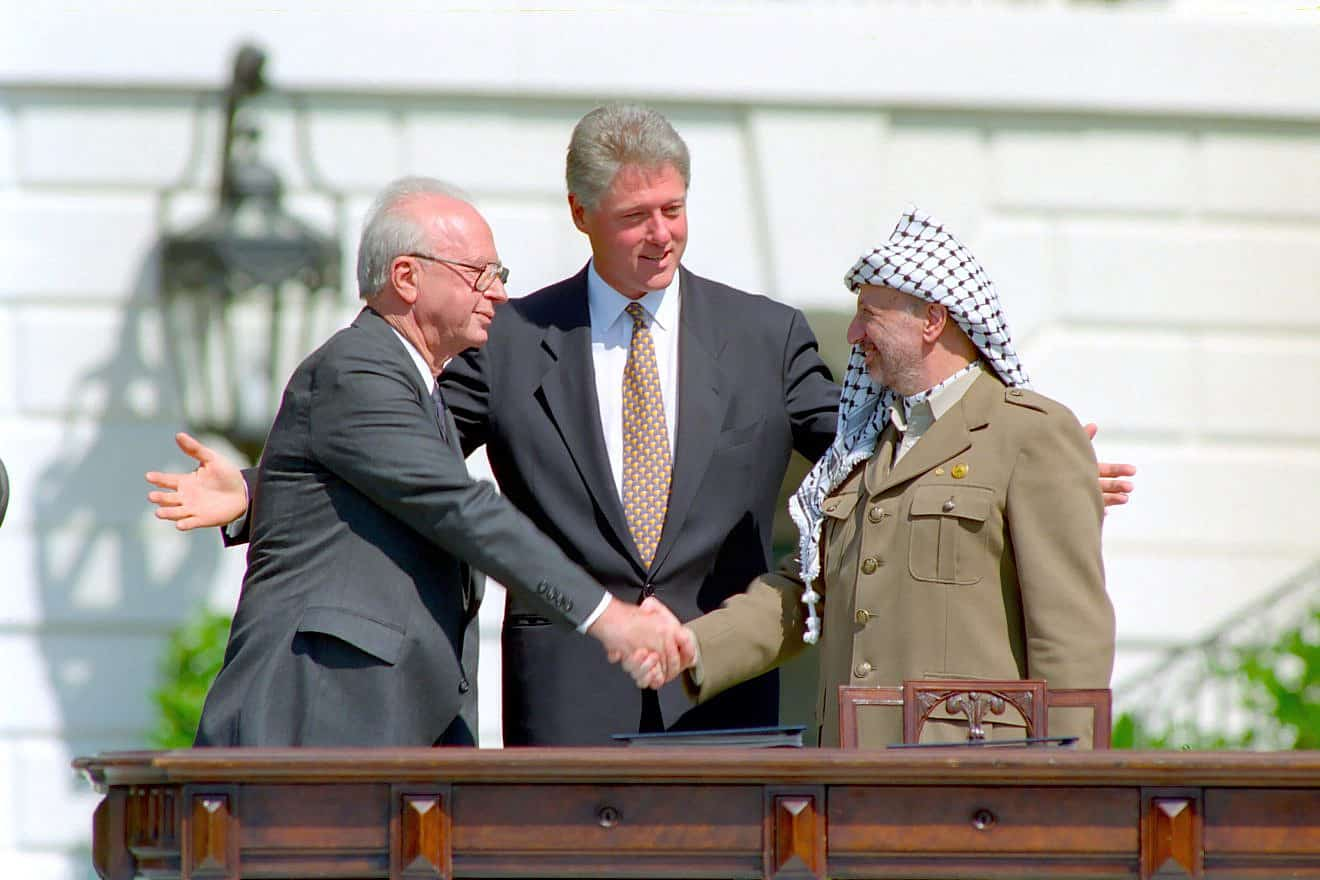
Yitzhak Rabin, Bill Clinton, and Yasser Arafat at the Oslo Accords signing ceremony on 13 September 1993

President Bill Clinton altered the official U.S. position towards the PLO. He supported the goal of a Palestinian state, but refrained from expressing this in public until the closing months of his administration.

On 10 September 1993, the eve of the signing of the Oslo Agreement between the Israeli government and the PLO, Clinton announced the resumption of the U.S.–PLO dialogue, suspended in 1990. The signing ceremony of the Oslo Accord on 13 September 1993, was held in Washington, D.C. in the presence of Clinton, even though negotiations for the agreement took place under the auspices of the Norwegian government. Following that ceremony, Arafat became a regular visitor to the White House, the first Palestinian leader to be accorded that honor. The U.S. government also became more involved in Israeli-Palestinian talks and invited both parties to come to Washington on certain occasions to push forward the peace process. This way, the Clinton administration brokered the Israel–Palestine ceasefire agreement of October 1996; and, in October 1998, Clinton brokered an agreement on further Israeli redeployment in the West Bank.

The Clinton administration also assisted materially to the formation of the Palestinian Authority by hosting the first donor conference for that purpose, held in Washington, D.C. on 1 October 1993. The 103rd United States Congress and President Clinton enacted the Middle East Peace Facilitation Act of 1993, which authorized the U.S. government to monitor PLO compliance with international law.

Following the Oslo Agreement and the establishment of the Palestinian National Authority in 1994, the PLO office was upgraded and renamed the PLO Mission to the United States.

The U.S. government took an active part in lending technical assistance in building the institutions of the Palestinian Authority, along with funding for PA security forces. On 30 March 1994, Clinton ordered the allocation of $4 million for the construction of a Palestinian police force, and on 16 March 1995, ordered additional $5 million to be allocated towards the same purpose. In July 1995, U.S. Congress passed the Middle East Peace Facilitation Act of 1995, which authorized the President to withhold funds from the Palestinian Authority in cases of what it viewed as in compliance with commitments made to the Israeli government under the Oslo Agreement. In December 1998, President Bill Clinton became the first U.S. president to visit the Palestinian Authority.

=== George W. Bush administration (2001–2009) ===
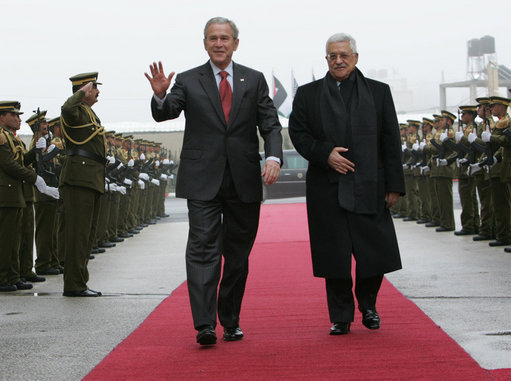
George W. Bush and Mahmoud Abbas stand before an honor cordon of the Palestinian Presidential Guard in Ramallah on 10 January 2008

U.S. attitudes towards the Palestinian Authority changed following the inauguration of President George W. Bush. President Bush refrained from meeting Arafat, and refrained from referring to him as "President Arafat", as Palestinian officials insisted, but only as "Chairman Arafat". During the first year of his administration, Bush maintained relations with the Palestinian Authority on the technical level only. Following another round of violence in the Palestinian territories, in June 2002 Bush expressed support for a Palestinian state following a process of negotiations. On 3 June 2003, Bush met for the first time Palestinian prime minister Mahmoud Abbas at a multilateral conference at Sharm El Sheikh, a format of meeting designed to avoid a direct meeting with Arafat, now viewed negatively by Bush and the Israeli leadership. On 25 July 2003, Abbas visited the White House for the first time. At that meeting, the two leaders established the Palestine Economic Development Group, a high level joint American-Palestinian committee to overlook economic ties.

Following Arafat's death in November 2004, the new Palestinian president Abbas became a regular visitor to the White House. Bush now referred to him in official communications as "President" instead of "Chairman", as was done with Arafat. Abbas visited the White House while receiving the honors of a head of state on six occasions between 2005 and 2008. During the visit of 26 May 2005, Bush stated his support for the parameters of the Palestinian state:

Any final status agreement must be reached between the two parties, and changes to the 1949 Armistice Lines must be mutually agreed to. A viable two-state solution must ensure contiguity on the West Bank, and a state of scattered territories will not work. There must also be meaningful linkages between the West Bank and Gaza. This is the position of the United States today; it will be the position of the United States at the time of final status negotiations.

Concerning the internal structure of the Palestinian Authority, Bush supported the Israeli demand for holding new presidential elections in January 2005 and parliamentary elections in January 2006. In January 2008 President George W. Bush visited the Palestinian Authority.

=== Obama administration (2009–2017) ===
Relations improved under President Barack Obama. From the beginning of his administration, Obama pledged his support for the establishment of a Palestinian state. Abbas visited the White House on at least four occasions between 2009 and 2014. In July 2010 the PLO mission was upgraded and renamed PLO General Delegation to the United States.

During fiscal year 2011, the U.S. government gave the Palestinian Authority $200 million in direct budget support.

==== Tension in U.S.-Palestinian relations ====
In 2011, relations worsened as the Palestinians sought UN membership for a Palestinian state, which the U.S. government and Israel regarded as a unilateral act. Obama told Abbas that the United States would veto any UN Security Council move to recognize Palestinian statehood. The Palestinian efforts shifted to the UN General Assembly, which voted in November 2012 to admit Palestine as an observer state, while the United States voted against the resolution, and has continued not to recognize Palestine as a state.

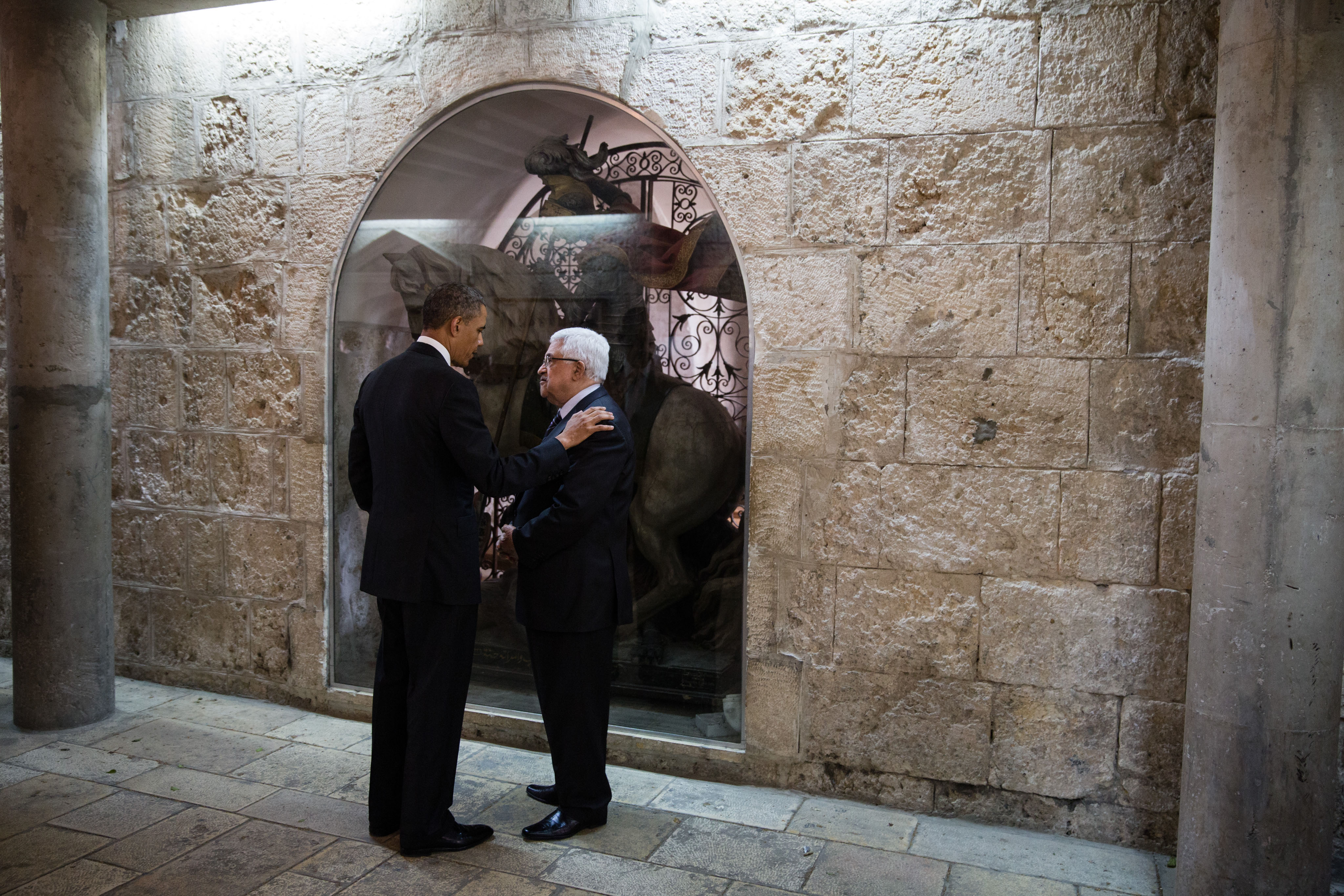
Obama, and Abbas in the West Bank in 2013

Short video of the meeting between Trump and Abbas in May 2017

Despite the passage on 29 November 2012, of the UN General Assembly resolution recognizing Palestine as a non-member observer state, Obama visited the Palestinian Authority for the first time as a President in March 2013. Then-Vice President Biden also visited the Palestinian Authority twice.

=== First Trump administration (2017–2021) ===
The Trump administration adopted a general stance of support for Israeli positions. On 3 May 2017, Palestinian President Abbas visited the White House for the first time during the Trump administration. According to Bob Woodward, citing as his source Rex Tillerson, Trump's early support for Israel wavered: he had begun to wonder whether Netanyahu might not be the major obstacle to a peace agreement between Israel and the Palestinians. On his visit to Israel on 22 May 2017 Trump met Netanyahu and was shown by the latter tapes that appeared to show Mahmoud Abbas advocating the killing of children. Netanyahu then asked him, 'And that's the guy you want to help?'. Trump was outraged by what he saw. After their meeting ended, Rex Tillerson was called in and shown the same material, a 'crudely forged video', and told the president the clips looked like fabrications. Trump remained convinced they were authentic. On the following day, at his meeting with Abbas in Bethlehem, Trump then lashed out at the Palestinian leader, calling him a liar and murderer. Woodward appears to suggest that this disinformation was behind Trump's decision to close the PLO office in Washington and cut off aid to the organization. This occasion, on 23 May, was Trump's first encounter with the Palestinian Authority.

On 6 December 2017, Trump announced the U.S.'s recognition of Jerusalem as the capital of Israel, a move condemned by Abbas, who described it as indicating U.S. withdrawal from its mediation role.

On 10 September 2018, Trump ordered the closure of the Palestinian office in Washington, D.C., citing the PLO's lack of progress in the peace process. Despite condemnation, the mission was closed on 11 October 2018.

On 18 October 2018, United States Secretary of State Mike Pompeo announced that the U.S. Consulate-General in Jerusalem would be merged into the U.S. Embassy in Jerusalem. Pompeo announced that the United States would continue to conduct relations with the Palestinians through a special Palestinian Affairs Unit inside the embassy. This announcement was criticized by Palestinian officials including Palestinian Authority chief negotiator Saeb Erekat as an endorsement of the Israeli claim to Jerusalem and "Greater Israel."

On 31 January 2019, the U.S. confirmed it stopped all aid to Palestinians following a request from the Palestinians to do so for fear of future court actions against them as a result of the Anti-Terrorism Clarification Act allowing Americans to sue those receiving foreign aid in United States for "acts of war".

On 4 March 2019, the consulate-general ceased operating as an independent mission and was revamped as the Palestinian Affairs Unit, reporting to the embassy. In response, Saeb Erekat, the secretary-general of the PLO's executive committee called for the international community to boycott the new Palestinian Affairs Unit, regarding it as a "downgrade" and "assault" on the peace process. Another Palestinian official Hanan Ashrawi claimed that the merger of the consulate general into the embassy represented an assault on Palestinian rights and identity.

Speaking to the UN Security Council in October 2019, U.S. Ambassador to the United Nations Kelly Craft called Hamas "a terrorist organization that oppresses the Palestinian people in Gaza through intimidation and outright violence, while inciting violence against Israel." She condemned as "despicable" Hamas's violence against its own people, its use of Palestinian children as pawns, and its indiscriminate attacks on Israeli civilian areas, and called it one of the greatest obstacles to resolving the Israeli–Palestinian conflict.

In November 2019, Donald Trump rejected the request by Benjamin Netanyahu to allow the transfer of $12 million to the security forces of Palestine Authority (PA). The request was made after the US State Department amid its aid cuts to the Palestinians realized that the amount in aid to PA forces was neither stopped nor transferred.

=== Biden administration (2021–2025) ===
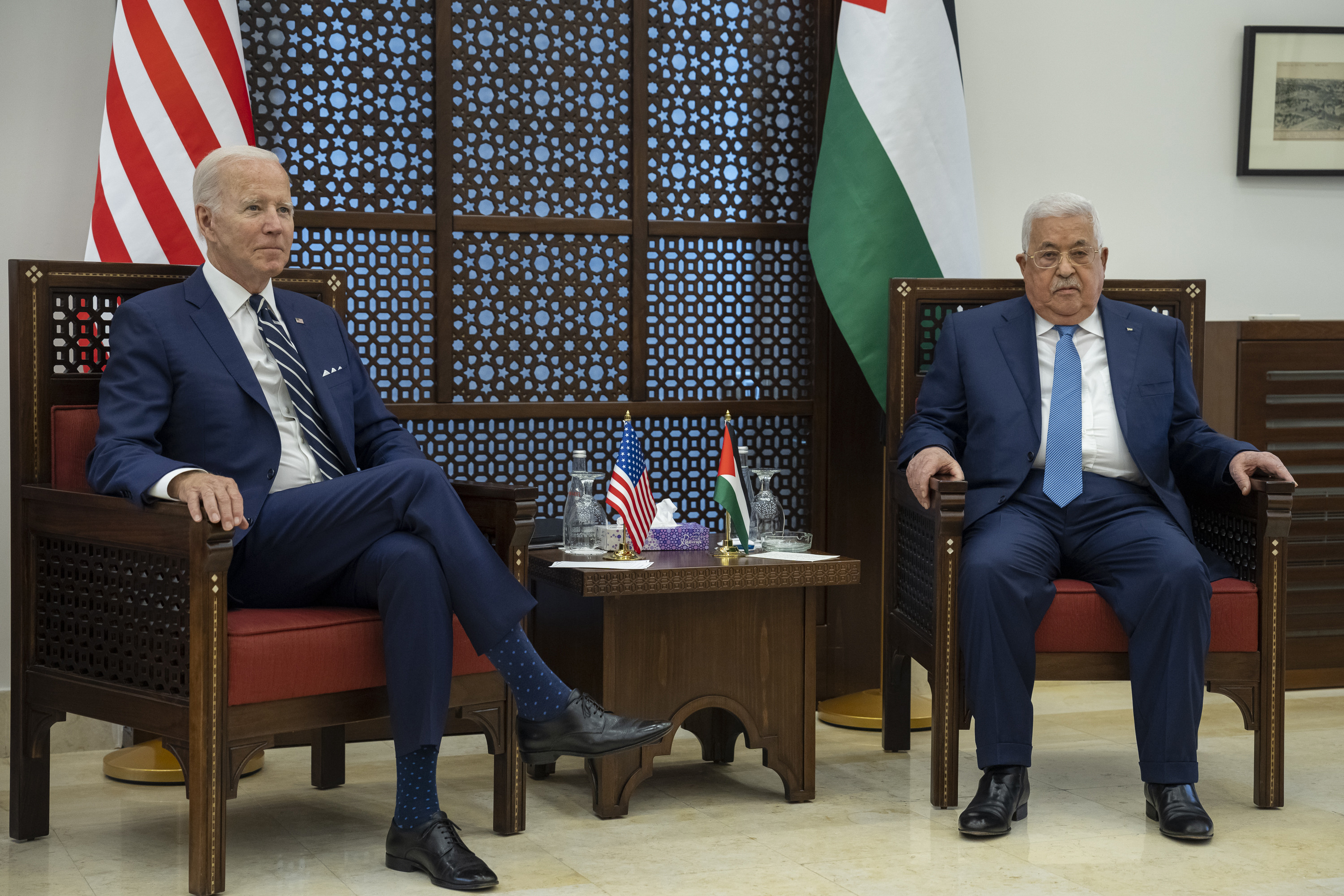
Biden with Mahmoud Abbas at the Palestinian Presidential Palace in Bethlehem, 15 July 2022.

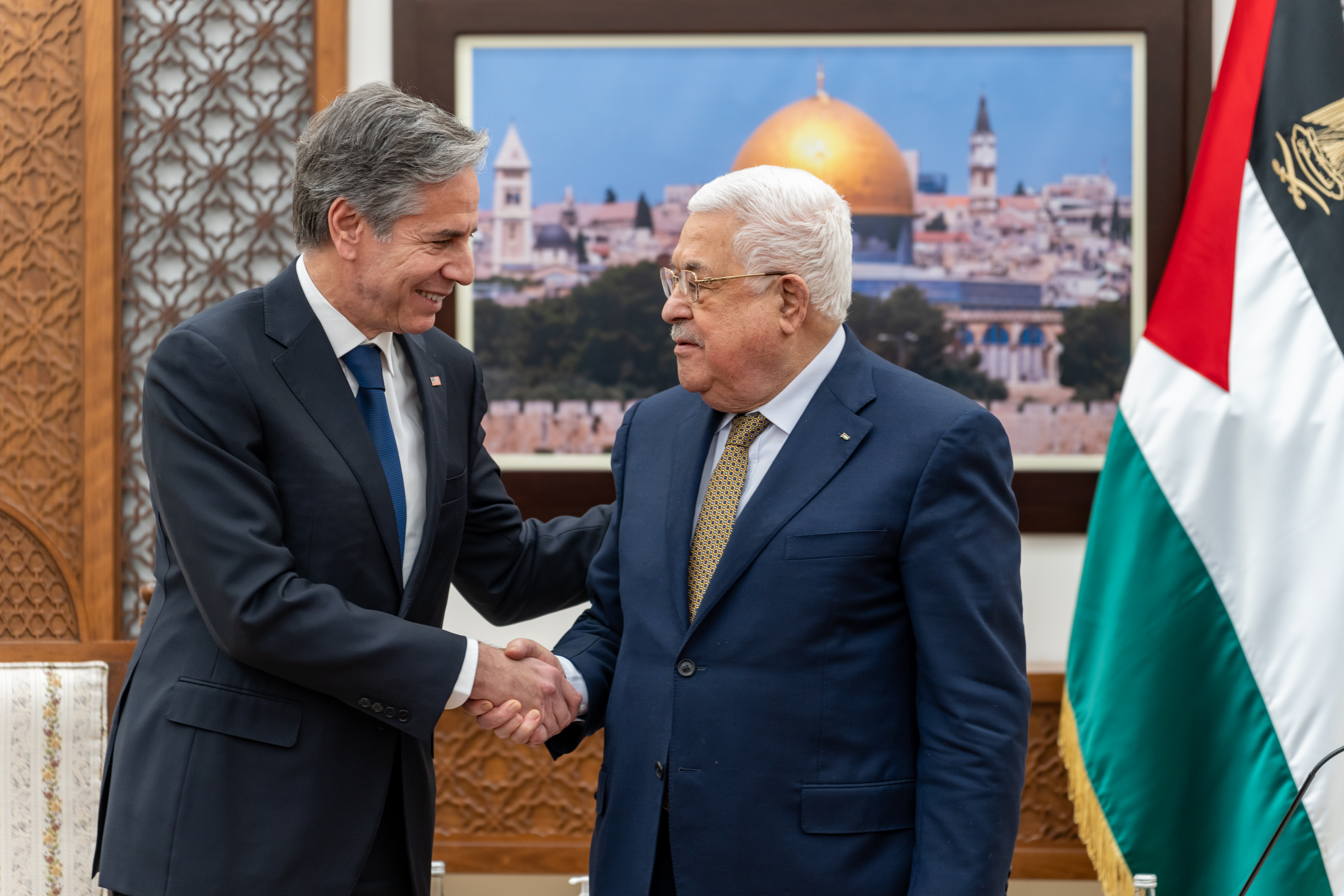
Secretary of State Antony Blinken with Mahmoud Abbas in Ramallah, 31 January 2023.

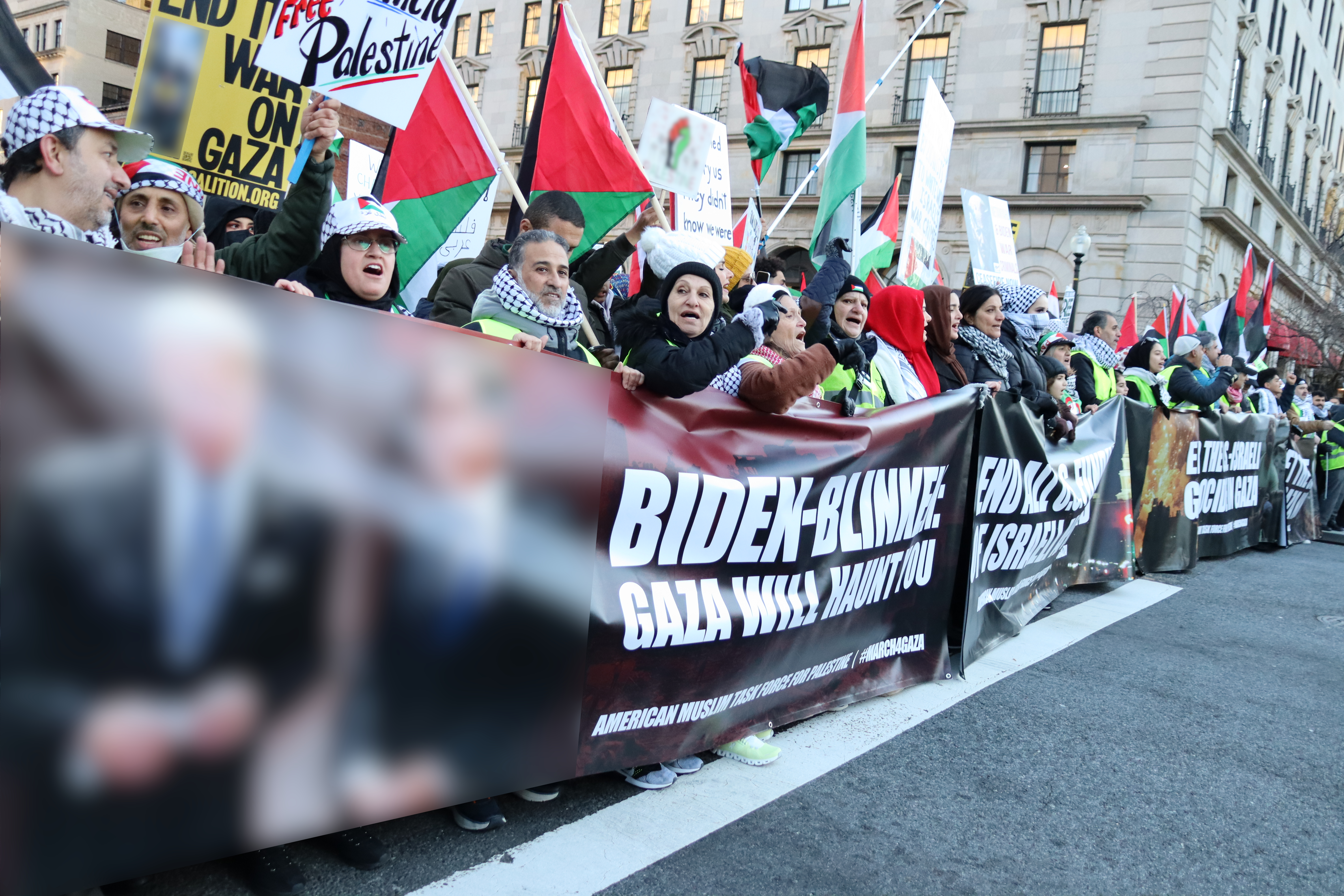
March on Washington for Gaza in January 2024

The Biden administration announced on 26 January 2021 that it would restore relations with Palestine and provide aid to Palestinians.

On 25 May 2021, Secretary of State Antony Blinken announced that the U.S. would reopen its Palestinian consulate in Jerusalem, but no specific date was given.

In June 2022, the "Palestinian Affairs Unit" (PAU) was renamed the "United States Office of Palestinian Affairs" and will report directly to Washington "on substantive matters".

Following the Hamas attack on Israel on 7 October 2023, Biden and his aides attempted to negotiate with militant groups in Gaza, as well as Abbas. Twice in the two months following the attack, Biden publicly declared himself to be a Zionist.

On 18 October 2023, the Biden administration vetoed a UN resolution that would have condemned all violence against civilians in the Gaza war, including "the heinous terrorists attacks by Hamas" against Israel, and called on Israel to allow humanitarian corridors to Gaza. The United States provided humanitarian aid, including food, to Gaza through several airdrops. In addition on 7 March 2024, the U.S. military announced the construction of the Gaza floating pier to enable the delivery of humanitarian assistance by sea. Palestinian-US relations reached a new crisis in April 2024, as the US government vetoed a proposed Security Council resolution to accept Palestine as a full UN member. Palestinian President Abbas responded by declaring the Palestinian Authority will reconsider its relations with the US.

=== Second Trump administration (2025–present) ===
Trump has taken a pro-Israel stance and increased support for Israel in the Gaza war. Already during the transition period leading to his second term, Trump pressured both Israel and the Hamas government in the Gaza Strip to reach an agreement on ceasefire and return of Israeli captives in exchange for Palestinian prisoners. In his inaugural address, he commended the deal achieved. In January 2025, Trump proposed the relocation of many Palestinians from the Gaza Strip to other countries in order to enable the reconstruction of built-up areas following the war, but this plan was rejected by many Arab governments, as well as by the Palestinian Authority.

Following a February 4, 2025 meeting with Israeli Prime Minister Benjamin Netanyahu, President Trump again suggested that Palestinians be relocated to other countries. Later that day, Trump claimed that the United States would take over and own the Gaza Strip.

In June 2025, US Ambassador to Israel Mike Huckabee stated that the United States no longer firmly supports the establishment of a Palestinian state, suggesting instead that it could be formed elsewhere in the Middle East due to what he described as a lack of space and cultural conditions in the West Bank, conditions he said would not change "in our lifetime." He also criticized efforts to recognize Palestinian statehood during the Gaza war, calling such initiatives inappropriate and affirming that the United States would not participate in them.

According to the State Department's announcement in August 2025, the United States will deny visas to members and officials of the Palestinian Authority (PA) and the Palestine Liberation Organization (PLO). Some politicians believe that this US action was in response to the recognition of Palestine by some countries, including France, the United Kingdom, and Canada. In September 2026, the United States denied visas to the Palestinian President Mahmoud Abbas for the second time to attend the UN General Assembly.

In early August 2025, more than a dozen Democratic legislators sent a letter to the President and the Secretary of State, urging the U.S. government to extend formal recognition to the State of Palestine. The letter underscored that the recognition of the Palestinian people's right to self-determination was a long-overdue act.

== Economic relations ==
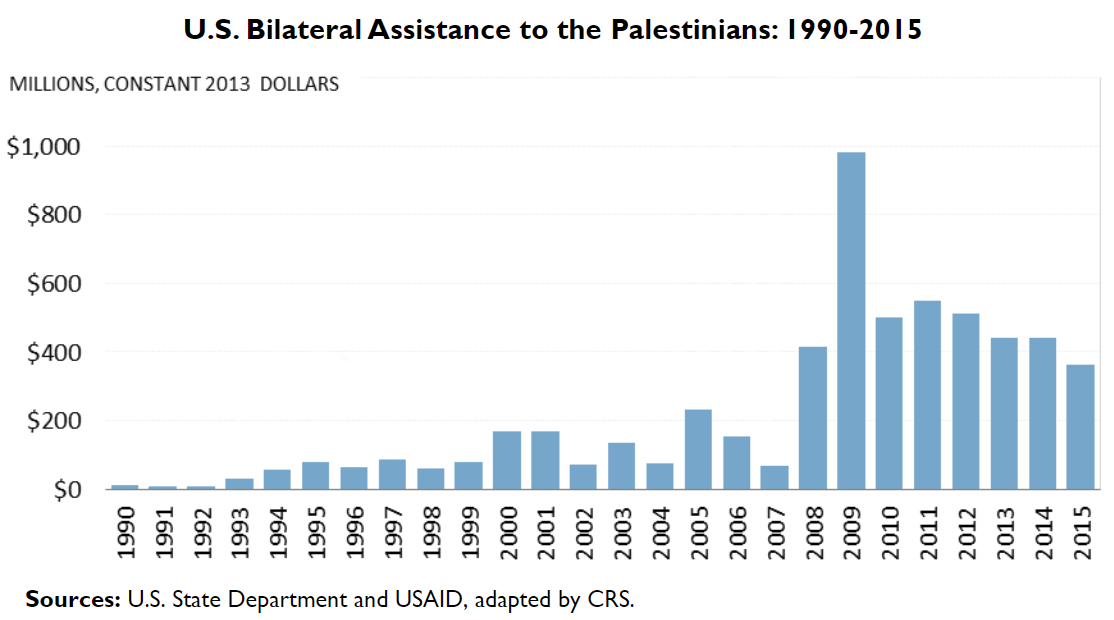
US Aid to Palestinian Authority

Direct trade relations between the Palestinian territories and the United States are relatively limited, as there is no fully-fledged Palestinian state and Israel largely controls the territories' foreign trade policy. Nevertheless, Palestinian goods have enjoyed tariff preferences in the US since the 1990s: in 1996, President Bill Clinton signed a proclamation granting duty-free access for imports from the West Bank and Gaza. For example, stone and marble products from the West Bank are exported to the US in significant quantities, but overall this trade is underdeveloped. Conversely, many consumer and industrial goods in the Palestinian territories originate indirectly from the United States. According to estimates, the West Bank and Gaza imported goods worth a total of around US$800 million from the US (directly or via third countries) in 2022. However, Israel, neighboring countries, and China dominate the import statistics by far as trading partners.

Much more significant than trade is US economic aid to the Palestinians. Since the establishment of the Palestinian Authority in 1994, the US has continuously provided funds for the development of administrative structures, infrastructure, and social services. By 2020, bilateral US aid to the Palestinians had totaled over $5 billion. Projects were carried out in water and health care, education programs, and support for small and medium-sized enterprises. Palestinian security forces were also trained and equipped with US support to ensure stability and Israeli-Palestinian security cooperation.

== US position on Palestinian participation in international organizations ==
The United States government has repeatedly made it clear that it rejects unilateral moves by Palestine in international bodies as long as no negotiated peace agreement with Israel has been reached. Specifically, the US has used diplomatic and financial pressure to prevent Palestine from being recognized as a full member state in the UN and other organizations. On November 29, 2012, 138 states voted in favor of upgrading Palestine to "non-member observer state" status in the UN (after the US had used its vote to prevent full membership), which amounts to de facto recognition as a state. The US was among the few dissenting votes and criticized the move. More recently, the US has also hindered the Palestinian Authority's participation in UN meetings in New York by imposing entry bans on Palestinian representatives, so that at the end of 2025 they were only able to participate in conferences virtually.

The US sent a particularly clear signal in the UNESCO conflict in 2011: When the UN cultural organization UNESCO admitted Palestine as a full member in 2011, the United States immediately announced that it would suspend its contributions to UNESCO. Washington has made it clear that it considers any recognition of Palestine by the international community to be premature until a final status agreement has been negotiated. This also applies to the International Criminal Court (ICC) in The Hague: in 2015, the Palestinians acceded to the Rome Statute of the ICC in order to have possible war crimes in the occupied territories prosecuted. The US, which is not itself a signatory to the ICC, vehemently rejected this move. A spokeswoman for the US State Department emphasized at the time: "The United States does not recognize the State of Palestine as sovereign; therefore, it has no right to join the International Criminal Court."

Accordingly, Washington attempted to politically challenge the ICC's jurisdiction over Israel. The US also asserts its role as Israel's protector in the UN Security Council: since the 1970s, American vetoes have blocked dozens of draft resolutions that would have condemned Israel for its behavior toward the Palestinians or taken a pro-Palestinian step. In December 2024, the Trump administration even imposed sanctions on ICC judges who had issued international arrest warrants for Israeli officials (including President Netanyahu).

== Palestinian lobby in the US ==
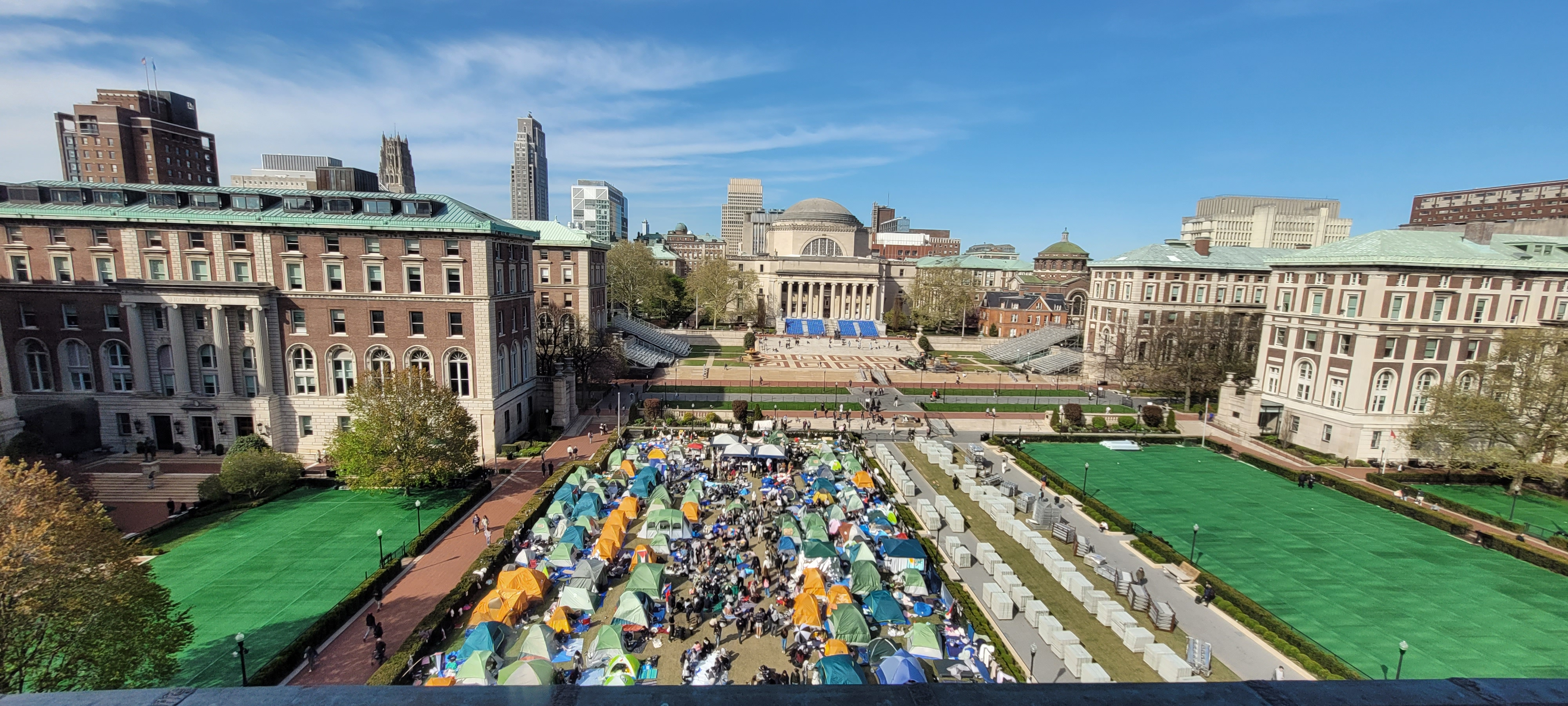
Gaza Solidarity Encampment at Columbia University (2024)

Pro-Palestinian activism has long existed within the United States, aiming to raise public and political awareness of Palestinian issues. Although the Palestinian-American community is smaller in number and less politically influential than, for example, the Israel lobby in the United States, numerous organizations and initiatives have formed over the years. A central network is the US Campaign for Palestinian Rights (USCPR), a nationwide umbrella organization of hundreds of groups such as American Muslims for Palestine, Jewish Voice for Peace, Palestine Solidarity Movement or Students for Justice in Palestine (SJP), which advocates for Palestinian rights and seeks a change in US policy toward the Middle East conflict. The USCPR coordinates campaigns, lobbying in Congress, and public relations work, and is one of the leading supporters of the BDS movement to boycott Israel in the US. These diverse actors in the US are united by the goal of making US policy on the Middle East more balanced and placing Palestinian human rights at the center of the debate.

== Public opinions ==
For a long time, the broad US public was predominantly sympathetic to Israel, but recently, there has been a noticeable shift in opinion in favor of the Palestinians. Opinion polls show a growing political divide: While many Republicans remain strongly pro-Israel, sympathy for the Palestinian side is growing significantly among Democrats and especially younger Americans. In 2023, a Gallup poll revealed for the first time that more supporters of the Democratic Party sympathized with the Palestinians (49%) than with Israel (38%). The outbreak of the Gaza War in 2023 led to mass rallies in support of the Palestinians in many US cities and universities. A wave of protests against the Israeli military action in Gaza spread, particularly at universities. Between October 2023 and May 2024, more than 1,360 student demonstrations on the Middle East conflict were recorded nationwide, over 94% of them supported the Palestinian cause, and 97% of them were peaceful. More than 40% of all documented political protests in the US during this period were related to Israel-Palestine, demonstrating the great potential for mobilization. A Gallup poll in February 2026 found for the first time that Americans sympathize more with the Palestinians (41%) than with the Israelis (36%), with 4% sympathizing with both equally, 9% with neither, and 10% having no opinion. Americans ages 55 and over strongly sympathize with Israel and younger Americans with Palestinians. According to a 2026 Pew Research Center survey, 9% of West Bank and East Jerusalem residents had a favorable view of the United States, while 81% had a negative view.

== PLO heads of mission ==
The PLO office in Washington, D.C. was headed by the following:

- Hatem Hussieni (1978–1982)
- Hasan Abdel Rahman (1982–1991)
- Anees Barghouti (1991–1993)
- Hasan Abdel Rahman (2nd time, 1993–2005)
- Afif Safieh (2005–2008)
- Nabil Abu Zneid (Chargé d'affaires, 2008–2009)
- Maen Rashid Areikat (2009–2017)
- Husam Zomlot (2017–2018)

== See also ==
- Foreign relations of the United States
- Foreign relations of Palestine
- International recognition of Palestine
- American Palestine Public Affairs Forum
- U.S. Office of Palestinian Affairs
