= Selah Merrill =

American clergyman (1837–1909)

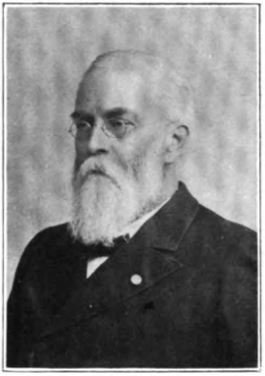
Selah Merrill

Selah Merrill (May 2, 1837 – January 22, 1909) was an American Congregationalist clergyman. He served as the American consul in Jerusalem.

== Biography ==
Selah Merrill was born in Canton, Connecticut on May 2, 1837, and died on January 22, 1909, at Fruitvale, California. He was the son of Lydia Richards and Daniel Merrill and was a member of the fifth generation of the Merrill family in America. The Merrills were descended from an old and esteemed Massachusetts family and his original immigrant ancestor was Nathaniel Merrill from Wherstead, County Suffolk, England and was one of the earliest settlers in Newbury, Massachusetts.

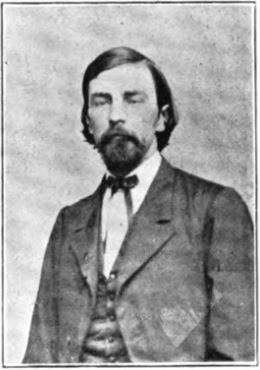
Selah Merrill, as a young man

After graduating from Williston Seminary in Easthampton, Massachusetts, he studied at Yale College, but did not graduate. He studied theology at the New Haven Theological Seminary, graduating in 1863, and was ordained in the Congregational Church, at Feeding Mills, Massachusetts in 1864. He then spent two years (1868–1870) in Germany at the University of Berlin where he studied the ancient Hebrew language. He received the degree of A. M. from Yale College; D. D. from Grinnell College in 1875; and a LL. D. from Union College in 1884.

He served as a chaplain of the 49th U. S. Colored Infantry, also known as the 11th Louisiana Regiment Infantry, at Vicksburg, Mississippi from 1864 until the close of the War.

In 1866, he married Fanny Lucinda Cooke, who died the following year. In 1868, he married Mrs. Phila (Wilkin) Fargo, who died only two years later. On April 26, 1875, at Andover, Massachusetts, he married Adelaide Brewster Taylor. She was born on January 14, 1845, at Rochester, New York; and died on January 24, 1929, in Piedmont, California. She was the daughter of Dr. Oliver Brewster Taylor, an 1848 graduate of Harvard University, and Sophia Hale Hubbard. She was the great granddaughter of Dr. Oliver Wadsworth Brewster, who served in Col. John Brown's regiment in the American Revolutionary War and was the first physician in Becket, Massachusetts. His home, built in 1786, is still standing and is currently occupied by the Becket-Chimney Corners YMCA.

In 1915, his wife donated his Josephus collection to Yale University and promoted the posthumous publication of his New Comprehensive Dictionary of the Bible.

== Career ==
During the last year of the American Civil War Merrill served as chaplain of the Forty-ninth United States colored infantry. In 1868, he went to Germany, where he studied for two years. In 1874–1877, he traveled to Palestine where he worked as an archæologist for the American Palestine Exploration Society, excavating the second wall of Jerusalem and trying to determine the site of Calvary. Merrill served as United States Consul in Jerusalem in 1882–1885, 1891–1893, and 1898–1907. He was a staunch opponent of the commune at the American Colony, Jerusalem and sought every opportunity to dismantle it. He also opposed Jewish agricultural settlement in Palestine and shaped the views of the U.S. State Department on this matter. Merrill was a virulent anti-Semite and his views influenced the State Department's opposition to Jewish resettlement in Palestine at that time.

In 1872 and 1879, he taught at Andover Theological Seminary and became curator of the Biblical Museum there. In 1907 he served as American Consul at Georgetown, Guiana.

== Published works ==
- Merril, S. (1881). East of the Jordan. New York: C. Scribner's Sons.
- Merril, S. (1881). Galilee in the Time of Christ. London: Religious Tract Society.
- Greek Inscriptions Collected in the Years 1875–1877 in the Country East of the Jordan (1885)
- The Site of Calvary (1886)
- Ancient Jerusalem (1908)
- Merril, S. (1908). Ancient Jerusalem. New York, Chicago [etc.]: Fleming H. Revell company.
