= Embassy of the United States, Jerusalem =

Diplomatic mission of the United States in Israel

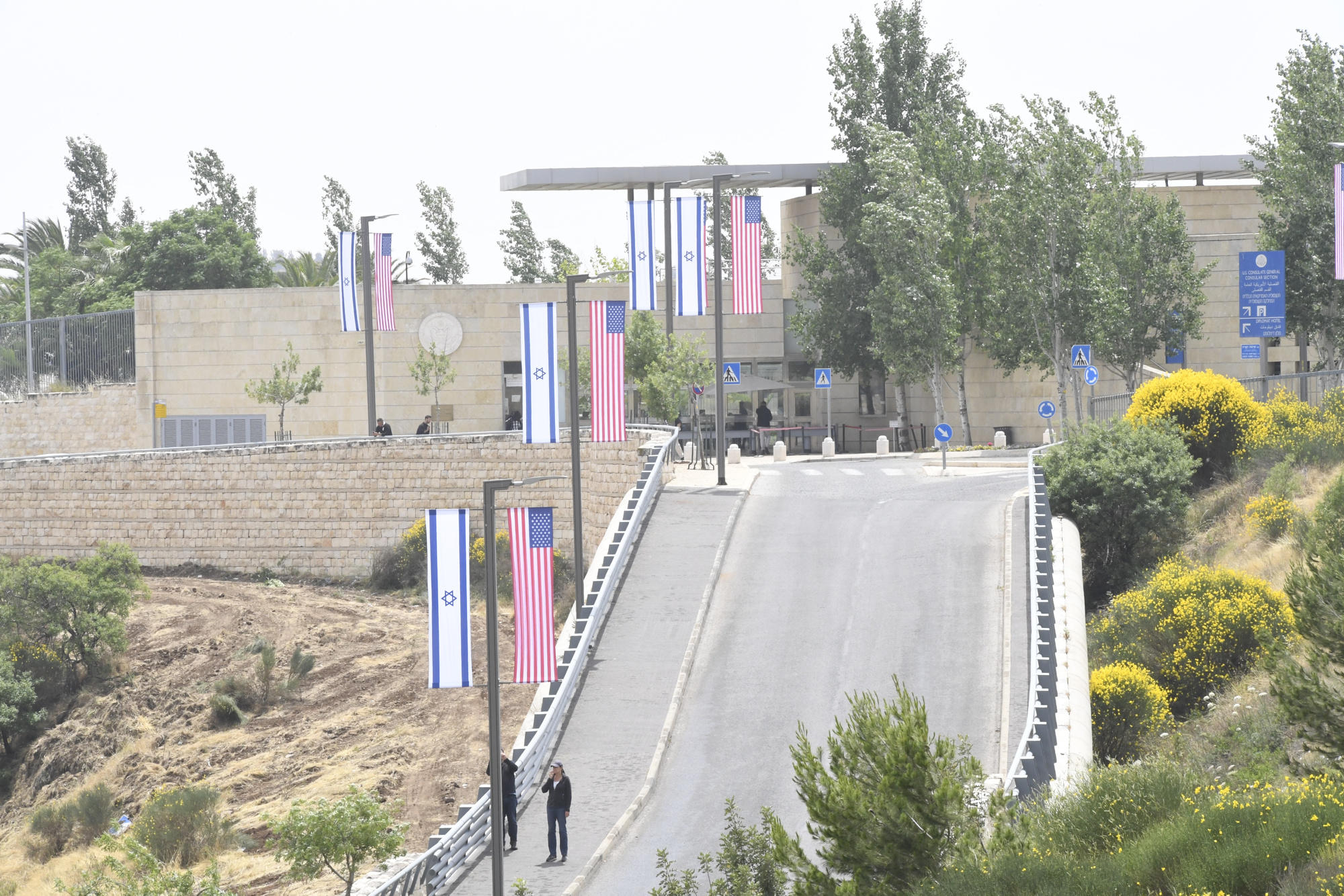
- Location: Jerusalem
- Address: 14 David Flusser Street, Talpiot
- Coordinates: 31°44′52″N 35°13′29″E
- Ambassador: Mike Huckabee
- Chargé d'affaires: Stephanie L. Hallett
- Website: il.usembassy.gov

The Embassy of the United States of America in Jerusalem is the diplomatic mission of the United States of America to the State of Israel. It is located in Talpiot, a neighborhood in southeastern Jerusalem. In mid-October 2018, Mike Pompeo, the Secretary of State under the Trump administration, declared that the new embassy would be merging with the Consulate General, through which the United States had maintained diplomatic relations with the Palestinian Authority. As of 2022, all diplomacy between the United States and the Palestinians is conducted through the "Office of Palestinian Affairs" inside of the American embassy for Israel.

== History ==
=== Relocation to Jerusalem from Tel Aviv ===
The embassy opened at its Jerusalem location on May 14, 2018, the 70th anniversary of the creation of the modern State of Israel. It was relocated from its previous site in Tel Aviv by the Trump Administration and is situated in what was previously the former United States Consulate in the Arnona neighborhood. The opening prayer was delivered by the Evangelical Reverend Robert Jeffress, and the closing prayer was given by the Evangelical Reverend John C. Hagee.

The move came 23 years after the passage of the Jerusalem Embassy Act of October 23, 1995, which set a deadline of May 31, 1999, for the move. The Clinton, Bush, and Obama administrations had all deferred the move. Eugene Kontorovich claimed that the decision to shift the U.S. embassy to this area is tantamount to the United States recognizing Israeli sovereignty over land that it captured in the Six-Day War in 1967.

Despite the new Embassy already being opened in May, President Trump signed an executive order on June 4, 2018, which yet again postponed the official move. He stated that he was required to sign the order because the Jerusalem Embassy Act requires the U.S. Ambassador to have a permanent residence in Jerusalem, a condition not yet fulfilled.

==== Merger with the U.S. Consulate General ====
On October 18, 2018, United States Secretary of State Mike Pompeo announced that the United States would be merging the embassy and U.S. Consulate General in Jerusalem into a single mission. The United States will continue conducting relations with the West Bank and Gaza through a newly created Palestinian Affairs Unit which will operate from the Agron Site of the Jerusalem Embassy. While the decision was praised by the Israeli Government, Palestinian officials criticized the first Trump Administration for siding with Israel's claim to Jerusalem and "Greater Israel". In February 2019, it was announced that the U.S. Consulate General would be formally merging into the U.S. Embassy in March.

On March 4, 2019, the United States Consulate-General was formally integrated into the U.S. Embassy in Jerusalem. The Consulate-General's Agron Street premises were revamped as the Palestinian Affairs Unit, which would handle many of the Consulate-General's former functions. This ended the United States' practice of assigning separate diplomatic missions to the Israelis and Palestinians. In response, Saeb Erekat, the secretary-general of the Palestine Liberation Organization's executive committee called for the international community to boycott the new Palestinian Affairs Unit. Erekat's sentiments were echoed by fellow Executive Committee member Hanan Ashrawi, who denounced the merger of the Consulate General as "political assault on Palestinian rights and identity". Ashrawi's visa request to the United States was subsequently denied.

On February 24, 2026, the U.S. Embassy in Jerusalem announced that it will provide routine passport services to American citizens in the West Bank settlement of Efrat for the first time starting late February (2026). The embassy described this as part of its efforts to make consular services more accessible to all Americans abroad, including similar pop-up outreach planned in 2026 for the settlement of Beitar Illit, the Palestinian city of Ramallah, and various locations in Israel (e.g, Haifa, Jerusalem, and Beit Shemesh).

On 1 July 2026, an agreement was signed between the US and Israel, designating the Allenby Compound as the site of a permanent U.S. embassy complex in Jerusalem. U.S. Ambassador to Israel Mike Huckabee said that this was a “historic day for the US-Israel relationship... deepening and expanding our presence in Jerusalem - the eternal capital of Israel".

=== International reaction ===
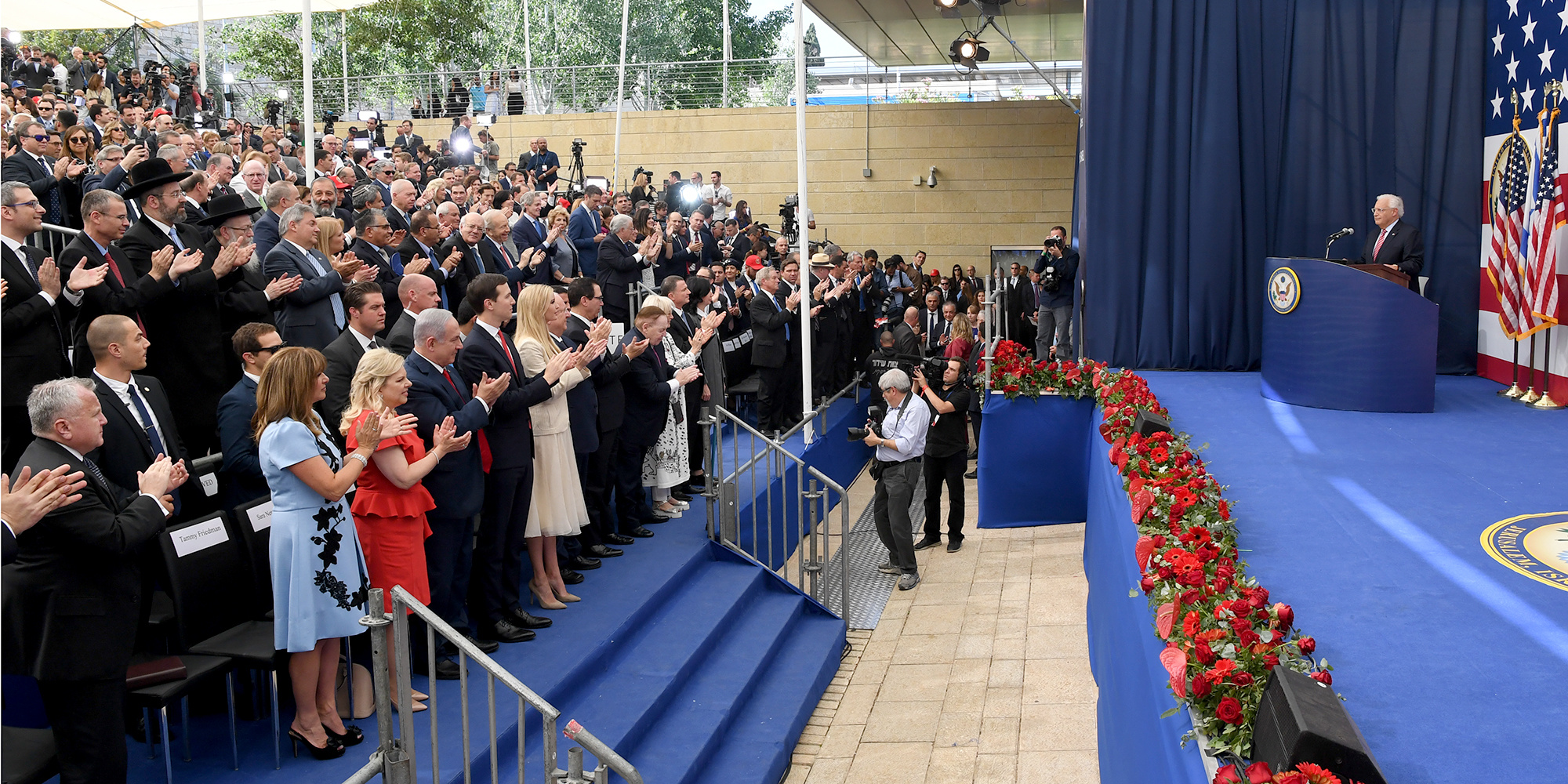
Benjamin Netanyahu, Jared Kushner and Ivanka Trump attending the opening of the United States Embassy in Jerusalem

On December 18, 2017, in a 14–1 vote, the United States vetoed a United Nations Security Council draft resolution on the matter, and then on December 21, 2017, the United Nations General Assembly passed a resolution by a 128–9 vote. Palestinian officials warned that it could lead to an "inactive war" and violent protests. The embassy's opening coincided with the bloodiest day of the 2018 Gaza border protests, with more than 57 Palestinians killed. French Minister of Europe and Foreign Affairs Jean-Yves Le Drian said, "This decision contravenes international law and in particular the resolutions of the Security Council and the UN General Assembly". On September 28, 2018, Palestine brought a case against the United States at the International Court of Justice alleging that the relocation of the embassy breached the Vienna Convention on Diplomatic Relations and other rules of general international law. The International Court of Justice asked for briefs covering jurisdiction and admissibility, Palestine's submission by May 15, 2019, the United States by November 15, 2019.

The opening of a new U.S. Embassy in Jerusalem led two other countries to move their embassies to Jerusalem. Two days after the U.S. Embassy opened, Guatemala moved its embassy to Israel back to Jerusalem. Paraguay also opened a Jerusalem embassy to Israel, citing the United States' precedent. Newly elected Paraguayan President Mario Abdo Benítez decided to relocate the Paraguayan embassy back to Tel Aviv.

==== ICJ: Palestine v. United States of America ====
In September 2018, the State of Palestine initiated an action in the International Court of Justice, in the case Palestine v. United States of America (officially titled Relocation of the United States Embassy to Jerusalem), in which Palestine charged the United States with violating the Vienna Convention on Diplomatic Relations by moving its embassy from Tel Aviv to Jerusalem, arguing the Convention requires that "the diplomatic mission of a sending State must be established on the territory of the receiving State." The Palestinian application argues that in international law Jerusalem cannot be considered to be the territory of the State of Israel because under General Assembly Resolution 181 of 1947 (the Partition Plan) Jerusalem was to have been placed under international governance, which thus precludes it from being considered under the sovereignty of any State.

The case also involves the question of the statehood of Palestine, as under the Statute of the International Court of Justice "only States may be parties in cases before the Court." The United States has refused to participate in a meeting at the Court and has not submitted its legal brief. Palestine has submitted its brief, which as of August 2020 has not been made public.

== Location ==
=== Recognition by the U.S. of Jerusalem as Israel's capital city ===
The United States Embassy is located in what was previously the U.S. Consulate General in Jerusalem's Arnona neighborhood. The space houses the ambassador and a 50-member staff. The ambassador splits his time between the US Embassy in Jerusalem and the Tel Aviv Embassy Branch Office, where many diplomatic functions are still be conducted. Most consular functions of the former consulate were subsumed under embassy authority.

The embassy straddles the 1949–67 Armistice line in Jerusalem, located partially in West Jerusalem and partially in no man's land. A senior United Nations official stated: "Under international law it is still occupied territory, because neither party had any right to occupy the area between the lines".

At a briefing on 18 January, Ned Price, Department Spokesperson for the Department of State, said the US is considering two options for the embassy facility, the Allenby site (the site of a former British barracks during the British Mandate which had been confiscated by Israel from its former Palestinian owners) and the current Arnona site, but that no decision has been made. Price was responding in relation to recent reports that the embassy was to be built on "land illegally expropriated from Palestinians".

==== Specialized Office for Palestinian Affairs in Jerusalem ====
For more see above under Merger with the U.S. Consulate-General.

The former U.S. Consulate General in Jerusalem's Agron Street premises has been repurposed as the US Embassy Palestinian Affairs Unit, which is responsible for conducting a range of reporting, outreach and programming in the West Bank, Gaza Strip, and with Palestinians in Jerusalem. Senior Foreign Service Officer Mike Hankey, who is fluent in Arabic and French, has been designated as the first Head of the Palestinian Affairs Unit.

In June 2022, the Palestinian Affairs Unit was re-designated as the U.S. Office of Palestine Affairs. While this office is still considered part of the U.S. Embassy in Jerusalem, it reports directly to the State Department, signifying an upgrade to the state of United States–Palestinian bilateral relations. It is headed by Senior Foreign Service Officer George Noll, who had served as the head of the Palestinian Affairs Unit since August 2020.

At the end of November 2022, the United States reiterated a promise, after two years of delay, to reopen the U.S. consulate in Jerusalem. As of January 2023, the Biden administration has not met this pledge.

== See also ==
- Consulate General of the United States, Jerusalem
- Tel Aviv Branch Office of the Embassy of the United States
- Israel–United States relations
- Palestine–United States relations
- List of diplomatic missions of the United States
