= List of ambassadors of Syria to the United States =

The Ambassador from Syria to the United States is Syria's foremost diplomatic representative in the United States, and in charge of Syria's diplomatic mission in the US.

== List of heads of mission ==
=== Ambassadors to the US ===
- March 19, 1945–1947: Nazim al-Kudsi
- 1947–1952: Fares al-Khoury
- 1952–1957: Farid Zeineddine
- 1961–1964: Omar Abu Risha
- 1964–1967: N/A
- 1967–1974: No diplomatic relations due to the Six-Day War
- 1974–1981: Sabah Kabbani
- 1981–1986: Rafic Jouejati
- 1990–2000: Walid Muallem
- 2000–2003: Rostom Al-Zoubi
- 2004–2011: Imad Moustapha
- 2012–2014: Zuheir Jabbour (Chargé d'affaires)
- 18 March 2014–2026: Diplomatic relations ended due to the Syrian civil war.
- 2026–present: Mohammed Qanatri (Chargé d'affaires)

== See also ==
- Syria–United States relations
- United States Ambassador to Syria
- Embassy of Syria, Washington, D.C.
- Embassy of the United States, Damascus
