= Mohammed Qanatri =

Syrian diplomat

- محمد قنطري
- Qanatri in 2026

Chargé d’Affaires of the Syrian Embassy in Washington, D.C., United States
- Incumbent
- Assumed office January 2026
- President: Ahmed al-Sharaa

Personal details
- Born: Teir Maalah, Homs Governorate, Syria
- Party: Independent (since 2025)
- Other political affiliations: Hay'at Tahrir al-Sham (until 2025)
- Education: Cyprus International University

Mohammed Qanatri (Note: Arabic: محمد قنطري) is a Syrian diplomat who has served as chargé d'affaires at the Syrian Embassy to Washington, D.C, United States, since 2026.

Born in the town of Teir Maalah in Homs Governorate, Syria, he holds a degree in civil engineering from Cyprus International University. Following the Syrian revolution, he participated in peaceful activism and armed action before joining Hay'at Tahrir al-Sham, where he served in the Political Affairs Department.

After the fall of the Assad regime, he served on a committee tasked by the Department of Political Affairs with overseeing the affairs of Syrian embassies and ambassadors. He subsequently worked on Syrian-American relations and was appointed Deputy Director of the American Department at the Syrian Ministry of Foreign Affairs in May 2025. In January 2026, the Syrian Ministry of Foreign Affairs appointed Qanatri as chargé d’affaires at the Syrian Embassy in Washington, D.C., United States.

== Biography ==
Qanatri was born in the town of Teir Maalah in Homs Governorate, Syria, and holds a degree in civil engineering from Cyprus International University. Following the Syrian revolution, he participated in peaceful activism and armed action before joining Hay'at Tahrir al-Sham, where he served in the Political Affairs Department. Qanatri later left Syria to study civil engineering in Cyprus and, after graduating, returned to Idlib, where he worked as a media relations officer at the Ministry of Information of the Syrian Salvation Government, appearing under the name "Muhammad al-Sadiq."

=== Controversies ===
In July 2026, American journalist Lindsey Snell, who was kidnapped by Jabhat al-Nusra in 2016 while reporting from Aleppo, alleged in a video she posted on X that Qanatri was involved in her kidnapping. Snell said she had met Qanatri while reporting in Aleppo, where he identified himself as a member of Jabhat al-Nusra and escorted her to military sites and hospitals. Snell later interviewed Qanatri, during which a masked man identified as Qanatri expressed support for establishing an Islamic state in Syria governed by Sharia law and suicide bombings.

== Career ==
After the fall of the Assad regime, he served on a committee tasked by the Department of Political Affairs with overseeing the affairs of Syrian embassies and ambassadors. The first in-person contact between U.S. troops and their Syrian counterparts took place after Assad's fall on 13 December, when Qanatri handed over an American national found in a prison to U.S. forces. He subsequently worked on Syrian-American relations and was appointed Deputy Director of the American Department at the Syrian Ministry of Foreign Affairs in May 2025.

In January 2026, the Syrian Ministry of Foreign Affairs appointed Qanatri as chargé d’affaires at the Syrian Embassy to Washington, D.C, United States, without officially announcing the move. The National Interest reported that Qanatri's appointment as chargé d’affaires in Washington was his first diplomatic appointment.

In April 2026, U.S. Congressman Joe Wilson wrote on X and said that Free Syria was represented in Washington for the first time with the appointment of a chargé d’affaires to its embassy. On 26 May, Qanatri met with U.S. Congressman Brian Mast to discuss strengthening cooperation and Syrian-American relations. On 9 August, Qanatri met with Syrian community members in several U.S. cities to discuss improving consular services and addressing their needs, and on 28 August, he met with U.S. Special Presidential Envoy for Syria Tom Barrack.
