= Hugh H. Smythe =

American author, sociologist, diplomat and professor

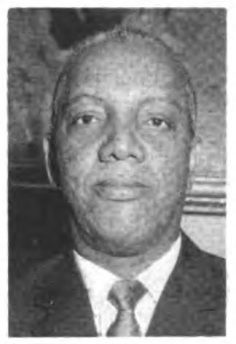

4th United States Ambassador to Syria
- In office October 28, 1965 – June 8, 1967
- President: Lyndon B. Johnson
- Preceded by: Ridgway B. Knight
- Succeeded by: Thomas J. Scotes

2nd United States Ambassador to Malta
- In office December 29, 1967 – August 16, 1969
- President: Lyndon B. Johnson; Richard Nixon
- Preceded by: George Joseph Feldman
- Succeeded by: John C. Pritzlaff Jr.

Personal details
- Born: August 19, 1913 Pittsburgh, Pennsylvania, United States
- Died: June 22, 1977 (aged 63) Manhattan, New York, United States
- Spouse: Mabel Murphy (m. 1939)
- Education: Virginia State University; Atlanta University; Northwestern University
- Occupation: Diplomat, professor, sociologist

Hugh Heyne Smythe (August 19, 1913 – June 22, 1977) was an American author, sociologist, diplomat and professor. He was the tenth African-American ambassador and the first to a Middle Eastern country.

== Life ==
Hugh Heyne Smythe was born in Pittsburgh, Pennsylvania on August 19, 1913. He enrolled at Virginia State College, an HBCU, in 1932, majoring in sociology, getting his B.A in 1936. He acquired an interest in foreign affairs around this time, but his application to work for the State Department was rejected. He earned his M.A from Atlanta University the next year. He then worked as a research assistant at Fisk University, where he studied under sociologists the Robert E. Park and Charles S. Johnson, and later received a Rosenwald Fellowship to study at the University of Chicago from 1938 to 1940. At Atlanta in the 1940s, he was a research assistant under W.E.B. DuBois. Around this time, he met and then married Mabel Murphy. (Note: Anderson (2008) claims they met at Atlanta, but Krenn (1997) claims they met at Fisk.)

In 1941, he began his doctoral studies in anthropology at Northwestern University. His graduate work was focused on the Garifuna, though he was denied a visa to Honduras in 1941 due to his race. Following the attack on Pearl Harbor, he joined the military. After passing through basic training at Camp Hood, Texas, he moved on to Fort Sill, Oklahoma. Though he originally told he was to be trained as a tank destroyer, he was actually trained as a gunner. He attempted to get a job at the Bureau of Educational and Cultural Relations, but failed, instead getting a release from the army in the summer of 1943.

In 1942 he was a research associate at Atlanta University. In 1945, he earned his Ph.D. in anthropology from Northwestern on ‘‘Patterns of Kinship Structure in West Africa’ under thesis advisor, Melville Herskovits, with funding from the Rosenwald Fund. He was also assistant director of research for the Negro Land Grant College Cooperative Social Studies Project (1944) and had teaching jobs at Morris Brown University in Atlanta (1944) and the Tennessee State Agricultural and Industrial University (1945-1946). He became deputy director of special research for the National Association for the Advancement of Colored People, working with W.E.B. DuBois, from 1947 to 1949. In 1948, he worked for Langston Hughes. The NAACP encouraged him to apply a job in foreign service, though racism prevented him from securing a job during his personal interview.

While working at a public relations and advertising firm in New York from 1949-1950, during which he was taking courses at Columbia University's East Asia Institute, he and his wife got appointments to teach in Japan. Hugh worked from 1951 to 1953 at Yamaguchi National University as a visiting professor of Sociology and Anthropology, and Mabel as the first woman professor at Shiga University. After returning to the U.S in 1953, he joined the Sociology Department at Brooklyn College, City University of New York, and remained in this position until his death in 1977. From 1957 to 1958 he was in Nigeria on a Ford Foundation fellowship to conduct research alongside his wife Mabel for his upcoming book "The New Nigerian Elite". He later helped co-directed the Crossroads Africa program.

As the Kennedy administration was pursuing desegregation, Smythe joined the foreign service in the 1960s. From 1961 to 1962, Smythe was a senior adviser in economic and social affairs to the US Mission to the United Nations. He also served a tour as the US senior advisor to the National Research Council in Thailand. He was also a U.S representative to many U.N committees and conferences, such as ECOSOC, the Sub-Commission on Prevention of Discrimination and Protection of Minorities, the Human Rights Committee, the Status of Women Committee, the U.N. Social Committee, the U.N. Statistical Committee, the UNICEF Program Committee and Executive Board Meeting, and the First International Conference of Africanists, held in Accra, Ghana, in 1962. He was also a lecturer at the U.S Foreign Service Institue. Returning to non-governmental work, from 1962 to 1965, he taught sociology at Brooklyn College. He became a Fulbright Professor at Chulalongkorn University in Thailand from 1963 to 1964. In 1965 he was chief consultant to the Youth in Action poverty program in Brooklyn.

He was appointed as the United States Ambassador to Syria from 1965 to 1967. Anti-Americanism was rampant in Syria at the time, due to the relationship between the United States and Israel, Syria's rival. As Syria was one of the most pro-Soviet countries in the region, who frequently criticized racism in the United States, it was thought that his appointment would weight out of those arguments, though Syrian protests in front of the American embassy accused him of being a traitor to his race. Syrian-American relations were at a low point; just a few months before his arrival, the Syrian government expelled the U.S. embassy’s second secretary and another embassy employee over espionage charges. Despite being constantly surveilled, he helped increase United States Information Service programs, set up local health programs and other aid programs, as well as visiting all twelve of Syria's provinces. His tenure coincided with the Six-Day War and the severing of diplomatic ties with the United States. He later became notorious for the "Smythe Telegram" that he wrote during the increasing tensions before the war, where he demanded that the U.S. return to a pro-Arab foreign policy and said that the U.S. should ignore previous promises to Israel that Egypt would not be allowed to ban Israeli ships from transiting the Straits of Tiran. He left the country on June 8, 1967 after Syria severed diplomatic ties with the US and became the ambassador to Malta. While Syria expelled the U.S embassy, he was able to secure an extension of the evacuation order.

He was later appointed the ambassador to Malta. He later returned to teaching at Brooklyn College. He also went on to be a consultant to the Department of State and the Congressional Black Caucus. He died on June 22, 1977

== Works ==
=== Books ===
- Smythe, Hugh H.; Weintraub, Sandra (1971). "Intergroup Relations in Israel". In Curtis, Michael (ed.). People and Politics in the Middle East. Transaction Publishers.
- Crow, Lester D.; Murray, Walter I.; Smythe, Hugh H. (1966). Educating the Culturally Disadvantaged Child: Principles and Programs. McKay.
- Smythe, Hugh Heyne (1964). Congo Dynamics: Perspective 1964. American Negro Leadership Conference on Africa.
- Smythe, Hugh; Smythe, Mabel M. (1960). The New Nigerian Elite. Stanford University Press.

=== Journal articles ===
- Shivery, Louie Davis; Smythe, Hugh H. (1942). "The Neighborhood Union: A Survey of the Beginnings of Social Welfare Movements among Negroes in Atlanta". Phylon (1940-1956). 3 (2). Clark Atlanta University: 149–162. doi:10.2307/271522. ISSN 0885-6818. JSTOR 271522.
- Smythe, Mabel M.; Smythe, Hugh H. (1944). "Economics and Business Administration Offerings in Negro Colleges". The Journal of Educational Research. 38 (4). Taylor & Francis, Ltd.: 298–312. ISSN 0022-0671.
- Smythe, Hugh H. (1947). "The N.A.A.C.P. Protest to UN". Phylon (1940-1956). 8 (4). Clark Atlanta University: 355–358. doi:10.2307/271748. ISSN 0885-6818. JSTOR 271748.
- Davis, Michael M.; Smythe, Hugh H. (1949). "Providing Adequate Health Service to Negroes". The Journal of Negro Education. 18 (3). Journal of Negro Education: 305–317. doi:10.2307/2966136. ISSN 0022-2984. JSTOR 2966136.
- Smythe, Hugh H. (1948). "The Concept "Jim Crow"". Social Forces. 27 (1). Oxford University Press: 45–48. doi:10.2307/2572458. ISSN 0037-7732. JSTOR 2572458.
- Smythe, Hugh H.; Smith, Rufus (1948). "Race Policies and Practices in Selected Public School Systems of Pennsylvania". The Journal of Negro Education. 17 (4). Journal of Negro Education: 549–554. ISSN 0022-2984. JSTOR 2966257.
- Smythe, Hugh H. (1948). "The N.A.A.C.P. Petition on the Denial of Human Rights and the United Nations". The Journal of Negro Education. 17 (1). Journal of Negro Education: 88–90. ISSN 0022-2984. JSTOR 2966094.
- Smythe, Hugh H. (1950). "Changing Patterns in Negro Leadership". Social Forces. 29 (2). Oxford University Press: 191–197. doi:10.2307/2571670. ISSN 0037-7732. JSTOR 2571670.
- Smythe, Hugh H. (1950). "The Southern Regional Universities Plan". The Journal of Higher Education. 21 (3). Taylor & Francis, Ltd.: 121–125. doi:10.2307/1976604. ISSN 0022-1546. JSTOR 1976604.
- Smythe, Hugh H. (1951). "A Note on Racialism in Japan". American Sociological Review. 16 (6). American Sociological Association, Sage Publications, Inc.: 823–824. doi:10.2307/2087510. ISSN 0003-1224. JSTOR 2087510.
- Smythe, Hugh H.; Smythe, Mabel M. (March 1952). "Report from Japan: Comments of the Race Question". The Crisis. Vol. 59, no. 3. pp. 159–164.
- Smythe, Hugh H. (1952). "A Note on Higher Education in Japan". The Journal of Higher Education. 23 (6). Taylor & Francis, Ltd.: 301–342. doi:10.2307/1976896. ISSN 0022-1546. JSTOR 1976896.
- Smythe, Mabel M.; Smythe, Hugh H. (1952). "Race, Culture, and Politics in Japan". Phylon. 13 (3). Clark Atlanta University: 192–198. doi:10.2307/271183. ISSN 0885-6818. JSTOR 271183.
- Smythe, Hugh H. (1952). "The Japanese Emperor System". Social Research. 19 (4). The New School: 485–493. ISSN 0037-783X. JSTOR 40982359.
- Smythe, Hugh H. (1952). "The Eta: A Marginal Japanese Caste". American Journal of Sociology. 58 (2). The University of Chicago Press: 194–196. ISSN 0002-9602. JSTOR 2772191.
- Smythe, Hugh H. (1952). "Japanese GARIOA Scholarship Students and Negro Institutions". The Journal of Negro Education. 21 (1). Journal of Negro Education: 120–122. ISSN 0022-2984. JSTOR 2965926.
- Smythe, Hugh H.; Naitoh, Yoshimasa (1953). "The Eta Caste in Japan". Phylon (1940-1956). 14 (1). Clark Atlanta University: 19–27. doi:10.2307/272421. ISSN 0885-6818. JSTOR 272421.
- Smythe, Hugh H.; Naitoh, Yoshimasa (1953). "The Eta Caste in Japan: Part II Present Status". Phylon (1940-1956). 14 (2). Clark Atlanta University: 157–162. doi:10.2307/271662. ISSN 0885-6818. JSTOR 271662.
- Watanabe, Masaharu; Smythe, Hugh H. (1953). "After the Japanese Occupation". Current History. 24 (137). University of California Press: 32–38. ISSN 0011-3530.
- Smythe, Hugh H.; Watanabe, Masaharu (1953). "Japanese Popular Attitudes toward the Emperor". Pacific Affairs. 26 (4). Pacific Affairs, University of British Columbia: 335–344. ISSN 0030-851X. JSTOR 2752870.
- Smythe, Hugh H.; Pine, Jerry J. (1955). "The Jew in America Since World War II". Phylon. 16 (1). Clark Atlanta University: 65–70. doi:10.2307/272623. ISSN 0885-6818. JSTOR 272623.
- Smythe, Hugh H. (1955). "Japan and China". Phylon (1940-1956). 16 (4). Clark Atlanta University: 463–471. doi:10.2307/272664. ISSN 0885-6818. JSTOR 272664.
- Smythe, Hugh H. (1958). "Social Stratification in Nigeria". Social Forces. 37 (2). Oxford University Press: 168–171. doi:10.2307/2572801. ISSN 0037-7732. JSTOR 2572801.
- Smythe, Hugh H.; Smythe, Mabel M. (1960). "Occupation and Upper-Class Formation in Nigeria". The Southwestern Social Science Quarterly. 41 (3). Wiley: 350–356. ISSN 0276-1742. JSTOR 42866563.
- Smythe, Hugh H. (1960). "Social Change in Africa". The American Journal of Economics and Sociology. 19 (2). American Journal of Economics and Sociology, Inc., Wiley: 193–206. ISSN 0002-9246. JSTOR 3484781.
- Smythe, Hugh H. (1960). "Urbanization in Nigeria". Anthropological Quarterly. 33 (3). The George Washington University Institute for Ethnographic Research: 143–148. doi:10.2307/3316510. ISSN 0003-5491. JSTOR 3316510.
- Smythe, Hugh H. (1962). "Israel and Africa: Some Common Problems". Jewish Social Studies. 24 (2). Indiana University Press: 97–107. ISSN 0021-6704. JSTOR 4465917.
- Smythe, Hugh H. (1964). "Scholarship in Thailand: Arid, Stunted, and Tradition-bound". The Journal of Higher Education. 35 (7). Ohio State University Press: 367–372. doi:10.2307/1979451. ISSN 0022-1546. JSTOR 1979451.
- Smythe, Hugh H. (1964). "Thailand Minority Groups". Phylon (1960-). 25 (3). Clark Atlanta University: 280–287. doi:10.2307/273786. ISSN 0031-8906. JSTOR 273786.
- Smythe, Hugh H.; Sasidhorn, Nibondh (1964). "Educational Planning in Thailand". Comparative Education Review. 8 (1). University of Chicago Press, Comparative and International Education Society: 37–40. ISSN 0010-4086. JSTOR 1186470.
- Sasidhorn, Nibondh; Smythe, Hugh H. (1965). "Population Control in Thailand through Female Sterilization". The American Journal of Economics and Sociology. 24 (3). American Journal of Economics and Sociology, Inc., Wiley: 301–306. ISSN 0002-9246. JSTOR 3485118.

== See also ==
- Smythe Biographical Notes
- Papers of Hugh H. Smythe and Mabel M. Smythe, circa 1895-1997, available at New York Public Library
- The "Smythe Telegram", Telegram From the Embassy in Syria to the Department of State, June 1, 1967, FRUS 1964–1968, vol. 19, document 117, pages 214-215
- Hugh Smythe Video on YouTube
- Hugh Heyne Smythe bio on history.state.gov

== Notes ==
Diplomatic posts
Preceded by Ridgway B. Knight	U.S. Ambassador to Syria; 1965–1967	Succeeded by Thomas J. Scotes
Preceded by George J. Feldman	U.S. Ambassador to Malta; 1967–1969	Succeeded by John C. Pritzlaff, Jr.
