= List of ambassadors of the United States to Syria =

Ambassador of the United States to Syria
- سفير الولايات المتحدة إلى سورية
- Seal of the United States Department of State

- Flag used by the United States ambassador to Syria
- Nominator: The president of the United States
- Inaugural holder: George Wadsworth as consul general
- Formation: 1942
- Website: U.S. Embassy - Damascus

The United States ambassador to Syria is the official representative of the president of the United States to the president of Syria.

From the partitioning of the Ottoman Empire in 1922 until 1944, Syria had been under the control of France as a part of the League of Nations Mandate for Syria and the Lebanon. The United States appointed George Wadsworth as agent and consul general to Syria and Lebanon on October 9, 1942, to provide a quasi-diplomatic presence in Damascus until the United States determined that Syria achieved effective independence in 1944. The United States recognized Syria as an independent state on September 8, 1944, when the Syrian Minister of Foreign Affairs, Jamil Mardam Bey, informed the United States that Syria fully recognized and would protect existing rights of the United States and its nationals. This Syrian assurance was in response to a letter sent on September 7, 1944, by the U.S. diplomatic agent and consul general in Syria that offered "full and unconditional recognition" upon receipt of such written assurances. The United States established diplomatic relations with Syria when George Wadsworth presented his credentials as Envoy Extraordinary and Minister Plenipotentiary on November 17, 1944. Wadsworth was concurrently the envoy to Syria and Lebanon while resident in Beirut.

Egypt and Syria united to form a new state, the United Arab Republic (UAR) on February 22, 1958 with its capital in Cairo. The U.S. recognized the UAR and the embassy in Damascus was reclassified as a consulate general. Syria seceded from the Union in 1961 and U.S.–Syria diplomatic relations were reestablished on October 10, 1961. The consulate general was once again elevated to embassy status.

Syria severed diplomatic relations with the U.S. on June 6, 1967 in the wake of the 1967 Arab-Israeli War. In the interim a U.S. Interests Section in Syria was established on February 8, 1974, in the Italian Embassy with Thomas J. Scotes as Principal Officer. Normal relations were resumed in 1974.

The U.S. recalled its ambassador to Syria in 2005 after the assassination of Rafic Hariri. A series of chargés d’affaires represented the U.S. until the appointment of Robert Stephen Ford in January 2011.

== Ambassadors and chiefs of mission ==
Name	Title	Appointed	Presented credentials	Terminated mission	Notes
George Wadsworth – Career FSO	Envoy Extraordinary and Minister Plenipotentiary	September 21, 1944	November 17, 1944	February 8, 1947	Served as Diplomatic Agent/Consul General from October 1942 to November 1944
James Hugh Keeley, Jr. – Career FSO	Envoy Extraordinary and Minister Plenipotentiary	October 8, 1947	August 2, 1948	July 22, 1950	
Cavendish W. Cannon – Career FSO	Envoy Extraordinary and Minister Plenipotentiary	September 20, 1950	October 30, 1950	May 8, 1952	
James S. Moose, Jr. – Career FSO	Ambassador Extraordinary and Plenipotentiary	June 25, 1952	August 14, 1952	June 30, 1957	On September 30, 1952, the U.S. delegation in Damascus was upgraded to embassy status. This required a promotion and new commission for the envoy.
Charles Yost – Career FSO	Ambassador Extraordinary and Plenipotentiary	December 24, 1957	January 16, 1958	Embassy downgraded to consulate status, February 22, 1958	Syria joined Egypt to form the United Arab Republic on February 22, 1958. The U.S. embassy in Damascus was downgraded to consulate status. After Syria seceded from the UAR, the consulate was reestablished as an embassy on October 10, 1961.
Ridgway B. Knight – Career FSO	Chargé d'Affaires ad interim	October 10, 1961	—	Promoted to Ambassador January 11, 1962	
Ridgway B. Knight – Career FSO	Ambassador Extraordinary and Plenipotentiary	December 7, 1961	January 11, 1962	May 27, 1965	
Hugh H. Smythe – Political appointee	Ambassador Extraordinary and Plenipotentiary	July 22, 1965	October 28, 1965	Jun 8, 1967	Syria severed diplomatic relations with the U.S. on June 6, 1967. Ambassador Smythe departed Syria two days later. The U.S. established an Interests Section on February 8, 1974 in the Italian embassy with Thomas J. Scotes as principal officer. The embassy in Damascus was reestablished on June 16, 1974, with Scotes as Chargé d'Affaires ad interim.
Thomas J. Scotes – Career FSO	Chargé d'Affaires ad interim	June 16, 1974	—	Superseded by Ambassador Murphy, September 9, 1974	
Richard W. Murphy – Career FSO	Ambassador Extraordinary and Plenipotentiary	August 9, 1974	September 9, 1974	April 23, 1978	
Talcott W. Seelye – Career FSO	Ambassador Extraordinary and Plenipotentiary	July 31, 1978	September 17, 1978	August 31, 1981	
Robert P. Paganelli – Career FSO	Ambassador Extraordinary and Plenipotentiary	September 28, 1981	November 12, 1981	June 13, 1984	
William L. Eagleton, Jr. – Career FSO	Ambassador Extraordinary and Plenipotentiary	October 4, 1984	December 6, 1984	August 31, 1988	
Edward Peter Djerejian – Career FSO	Ambassador Extraordinary and Plenipotentiary	August 12, 1988	October 2, 1988	July 25, 1991	
Christopher W.S. Ross – Career FSO	Ambassador Extraordinary and Plenipotentiary	August 2, 1991	September 25, 1991	March 22, 1998	
Ryan Crocker – Career FSO	Ambassador Extraordinary and Plenipotentiary	June 29, 1998	June 6, 1999	June 30, 2001	
Theodore H. Kattouf – Career FSO	Ambassador Extraordinary and Plenipotentiary	August 7, 2001	January 12, 2002	August 23, 2003	
Margaret Scobey – Career FSO	Ambassador Extraordinary and Plenipotentiary	December 12, 2003	January 10, 2004	February 16, 2005	Ambassador Scobey was recalled "for urgent consultations" on February 15, 2005, after the assassination of Rafic Hariri. Several chargés represented the U.S. until January 2011.
Stephen A. Seche	Chargé d'Affaires a.i	2005	N/A	2006	
Michael H. Corbin	Chargé d'Affaires a.i	2006	N/A	2008	
Maura Connelly	Chargé d'Affaires a.i	2008	N/A	2009	
Charles F. Hunter	Chargé d'Affaires a.i	2009	N/A	2011	
Robert Stephen Ford – Career FSO	Ambassador Extraordinary and Plenipotentiary	December 29, 2010	January 27, 2011	February 28, 2014	Syria severed diplomatic relations with United States in 2012 in response to its support of the Syrian rebels during the Syrian Civil War. The U.S. established an Interests Section on February 6, 2012 in the Polish Embassy in Damascus, until the Polish Embassy closed. Since March 1, 2013, a new Interests Section operates via the Government of the Czech Republic through its embassy in Damascus. Only emergency services for U.S. citizens are available. Neither U.S. passports nor visas to the United States can be issued in Damascus.
Daniel Rubinstein	Special Envoy	March 7, 2014	N/A	July 27, 2015	
Michael Ratney	Special Envoy	July 27, 2015	N/A	January 20, 2017	
Joel Rayburn	Special Envoy	July 23, 2018	N/A	January 19, 2021	
Tom Barrack	Special Envoy	May 23, 2025	N/A	May 29, 2026	

== See also ==
- Embassy of the United States, Damascus
- Embassy of Syria, Washington, D.C.
- Syria – United States relations
- Foreign relations of Syria
- Ambassadors of the United States
