= Lindsey Snell =

American journalist

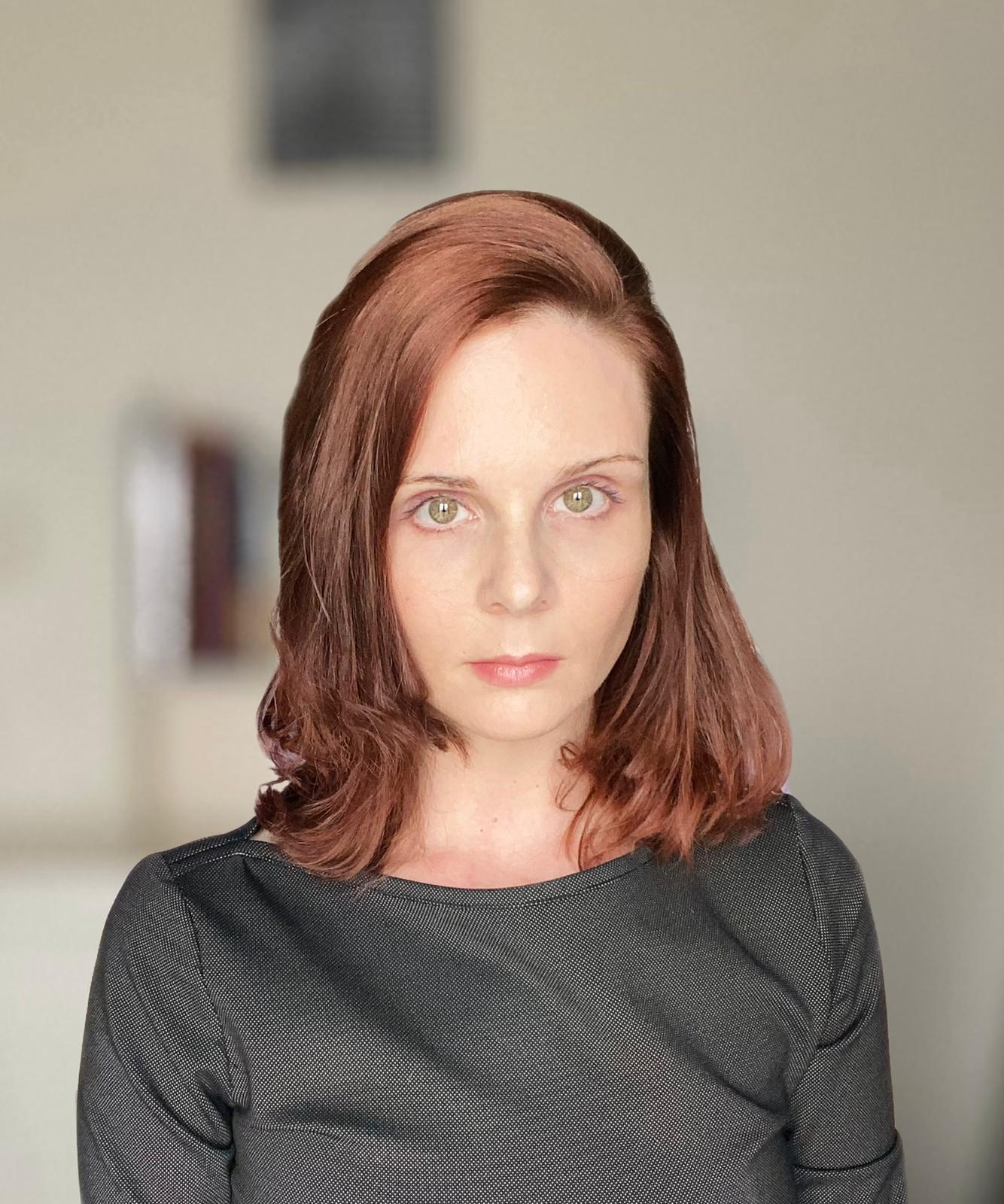
- Snell in April 2021
- Born: Daytona Beach, Florida, U.S.
- Occupations: Journalist, filmmaker
- Awards: Edward Murrow Award; Ben Bagdikian Media Award
- Website: lindseysnelljournalist.com

Lindsey Snell is an American journalist covering conflicts and crises in the Middle East and North Africa.

== Background ==
Snell's reporting about Syria and Iraq has been featured on MSNBC.

In 2011, Snell produced the feature-length documentary, Square Grouper: The Godfathers of Ganja, which premiered at the 2011 SXSW festival.

Snell was also an associate producer for the feature-length documentaries Cocaine Cowboys: Reloaded and Limelight which premiered at the 2011 Tribeca Film Festival.

She served as a researcher on short films documentaries 30 for 30 aired by ESPN such as The U (2009), Broke (2012) and Collision Course: The Murder of Don Aronow (2013).

In September 2020, Turkey deployed approximately 2,580 fighters from the Syrian National Army to fight in Nagorno-Karabakh, a development that Snell was among the first journalists to report, documenting the deployment of Turkish-backed SNA fighters to Azerbaijan during the Second Nagorno-Karabakh War (2020) between Azerbaijan and Armenia.

== Kidnapping in Syria and imprisoned in Turkey ==
In July 2016, while working, Snell was kidnapped by Jabhat al-Nusra, al-Qaeda's former affiliate in Aleppo, Syria. She escaped from the group after more than 2 weeks in captivity. After crossing the border from Syria to Turkey, she was arrested by Turkish authorities on August 6, and imprisoned for 67 days at İskenderun and Hatay high security prisons, during which time Turkish media accused her of being a CIA agent and charged her with violating a military zone. Snell was released in October 2016.

In 2018, while traveling to Baghdad, Iraq, Turkey attempted unsuccessfully to have Snell arrested via an Interpol diffusion notice.

In July 2026, Snell alleged in a video she posted on X and her Youtube channel that Mohammad Qanatri, a Syrian diplomat who became the newly-appointed the chargé d'affaires for the Syrian Embassy in Washington, D.C. in January 2026, was involved in her kidnapping in 2016. Snell alleges that Qanatri was at the time a member of Jabhat al-Nusra, and escorted her while she reported in Aleppo days before she was kidnapped. Snell posted a video of an interview she conducted with Qanatri in the days before her kidnapping, during which he allegedly expressed support for establishing an Islamic state governed by Sharia law in Syria and suicide bombings.

== Awards ==
A piece Snell produced for Vocativ about a girls' school in besieged Aleppo, Syria won an Edward R. Murrow Award in the Hard News category in 2016. Snell was awarded the Ben Bagdikian Media Award by the Armenian National Committee of Australia (ANC-AU) in November 2023.
