= Omar Abu Risha =

Syrian poet and diplomat (1910–1990)

- عمر أبو ريشة
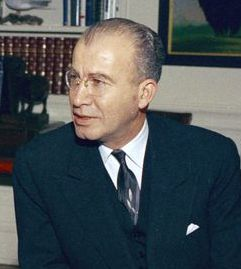

Ambassador of Syria to Brazil
- In office 1949–1953

Ambassador of Syria to Argentina (Note: During this period, he was also accredited in Chile.)
- In office 1953–1954

Ambassador of Syria to India (Note: Between 1958 and 1959, as ambassador of the United Arab Republic.)
- In office 1954–1958

Ambassador of the United Arab Republic to Austria
- In office 1959–1961

4th Ambassador of Syria to the United States
- In office 1961–1964
- Preceded by: Farid Zayn Al-Din
- Succeeded by: Sabah Qabbani

Ambassador of Syria to India (II)
- In office 1964–1970

Personal details
- Born: April 10, 1910 Manbij, Aleppo Vilayet, Ottoman Empire (now Manbij, Aleppo Governorate, Syria)
- Died: July 15, 1990 (aged 80) Riyadh, Saudi Arabia
- Spouse: Mounira Abou-Richeh
- Children: Chafe Abou-Richeh, Rafif Abou-Richeh Mattar, Rif Abou-Richeh
- Profession: Syrian ambassador, poet

Omar Abu Risha (Arabic: عمر أبو ريشة; 10 April 1910 – 15 July 1990) was a Syrian poet and diplomat. He served as the Syrian ambassador to the United States from 1961 to 1964 and was a renowned poet who lyricized Fī Sabīli al-Majd (In Pursuit of Glory), Syria's de facto national anthem.

== Biography ==
Abu Risha was born into a wealthy literary family in Manbij, near Aleppo. He received his educational upbringing in Syria and continued his tertiary studies at the University of Damascus. He also studied at the American University in Beirut in 1931 and later read chemistry at the University of Manchester but returned to Syria in 1932.

While initially a fan of Abbasid poetry, he later looked for more independent voices in poetry and considered Shakespeare's Venus and Adonis to be the greatest love poem ever written. His favorite poets were Charles Baudelaire and Edgar Allan Poe. He wrote the poem Khatam al-Hub (The End of Love) and produced literary works while attending to his duties as librarian of Aleppo, Syria. His works included several volumes of poetry and poetic dramas.

In 1949, the Syrian government appointed him ambassador to Brazil . During his diplomatic career, which extended until 1970, he also served as ambassador to Argentina and Chile (1953–1954), India (1954–1958), Austria (1959–1961) (Note: As ambassador of the United Arab Republic.) and, finally, the United States (1961–1964) before serving again in India (1964–1970).

== See also ==
- Syrian literature
