= John Bartlow Martin =

American author, speechwriter, and diplomat (1915–1987)

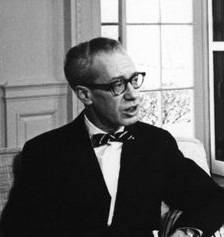
Martin on March 2, 1962

John Bartlow Martin (August 4, 1915 – January 3, 1987) was an American diplomat, author of 15 books, ambassador, and speechwriter and confidant to many Democratic politicians including Adlai Stevenson, John F. Kennedy, Robert F. Kennedy, Lyndon B. Johnson, and Hubert Humphrey.

== Early life ==
Martin was born on August 4, 1915, in Hamilton, Ohio, to John, a carpenter and contractor, and Laura Bartlow Martin, and as a young child moved to Indianapolis. Martin grew up in an unhappy childhood, plagued by the death of his two brothers. He graduated from high school at age 16 and was expelled in his first year from DePauw University, but he later graduated there with a degree in journalism.

== Journalism ==
With the impact of his dark childhood and onset of the Great Depression, Martin's early journalism career focused on deep concern for the underprivileged and forgotten, such as criminals, the impoverished, the working class, and the mentally ill. His work appeared in such publications as Saturday Evening Post, LIFE, Colliers, Atlantic Monthly, and Harper's. He won the highest magazine writing honor, the Benjamin Franklin Magazine Award, for four consecutive years. A true crime article Martin wrote, "Smashing the Bookie Gang Marauders" was made into the successful 1949 movie Scene of the Crime. It was the only movie based on his work.

== Political career ==
Martin was hired in 1952 as a speechwriter by Illinois Governor Adlai Stevenson, and later worked on the Kennedy presidential campaign. Martin was sent by Kennedy on a fact-finding mission to the Dominican Republic after the assassination of the dictator Rafael Trujillo in May 1961, and delivered his report in September. In gratitude for his analysis, he became the U.S. Ambassador to the Dominican Republic, serving from March 9, 1962, to September 25, 1963. As Ambassador, Martin was a critic of the new president, Juan Bosch. According to the historian Stephen G. Rabe, Martin "fancied himself a Roman consul whose word should be law in the Dominican Republic." Martin resigned shortly after the Kennedy assassination, on the day in which Bosch was toppled in a coup d'état, but returned to the Dominican Republic as a special envoy in 1965 during the invasion dispatched by Johnson.

== Death and legacy ==
He died on January 3, 1987, in Highland Park, Illinois, of throat cancer.

In 2008, The Library of America selected his story "Butcher's Dozen" for inclusion in its two-century retrospective of American True Crime.

== Selected bibliography ==
- Break Down the Walls American Prisons: Present, Past, and Future. Ballantine Books. 1954.
- Jimmy Hoffa's Hot. Fawcett Publications. 1959.
- Overtaken by Events: The Dominican Crisis from the Fall of Trujillo to the Civil War. Doubleday. 1966.
- Adlai Stevenson of Illinois: The Life of Adlai E. Stevenson. Doubleday. 1976.

Diplomatic posts
Preceded by Vinton Chapin	United States Ambassador to the Dominican Republic; 9 March 1962 – 25 September 1963	Succeeded by W. Tapley Bennett, Jr.
