= Ridgway B. Knight =

American diplomat

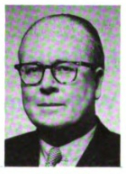

United States Ambassador to Portugal
- In office July 30, 1969 – February 24, 1973
- President: Richard Nixon
- Preceded by: W. Tapley Bennett Jr.
- Succeeded by: Stuart Nash Scott

44th United States Ambassador to Belgium
- In office June 24, 1965 – April 16, 1969
- President: Lyndon B. Johnson; Richard Nixon
- Preceded by: Douglas MacArthur II
- Succeeded by: John Eisenhower

United States Ambassador to Syria
- In office January 11, 1962 – May 27, 1965
- President: John F. Kennedy; Lyndon B. Johnson
- Succeeded by: Hugh H. Smythe

Personal details
- Born: Ridgway Brewster Knight; June 12, 1911 Paris, France
- Died: August 14, 2001 (aged 90) Inxent, France
- Profession: Diplomat

Ridgway Brewster Knight (June 12, 1911 – August 14, 2001) was an American diplomat who served as Ambassador to Syria (1961–1965), Belgium (1965–1969) and Portugal (1969–1973).

== Early life and career ==
The son of American parents living in Paris (painter Louis Aston Knight and Caroline Ridgeway Brewster), he attended the University of Paris as well as Harvard University. He graduated from Harvard Business School in 1931.

Following his studies, Knight began importing French wine to the US. He also served as a Major in the US Army from 1943-1945.

Knight joined the State Department in 1941. He was vice consul in Casablanca, and in 1942 took part in organizing the US landing in Algeria. Knight served as U.S. ambassador to several countries, and later served as president of the American Club of Paris (1984–1989). From 1973 to 1981, he worked for Chase Manhattan Bank .

== Personal life and death ==
Knight married Christine Saint-Léger at Inxent on February 19, 1983. His grandson, Ridgway B. Knight 3rd, married Patricia Wachtell on May 30, 1987. He died in Inxent, at the age of 90.

== Sources ==
- "Belgium". U.S. Department of State.
- "Portugal". U.S. Department of State.
- "Syria". U.S. Department of State.
- "AMBASSADOR RIDGWAY B. KNIGHT", The Association for Diplomatic Studies and Training
- The John F. Kennedy National Security Files, 1961–1963

Diplomatic posts
Preceded by Charles W. Yost	United States Ambassador to Syria; 1961–1965	Succeeded by Hugh H. Smythe
Preceded by Douglas MacArthur II	United States Ambassador to Belgium; 1965–1969	Succeeded by John S. D. Eisenhower
Preceded by W. Tapley Bennett Jr.	United States Ambassador to Portugal; 1969–1973	Succeeded by Stuart Nash Scott
