= Argentina–Syria relations =

Bilateral relations

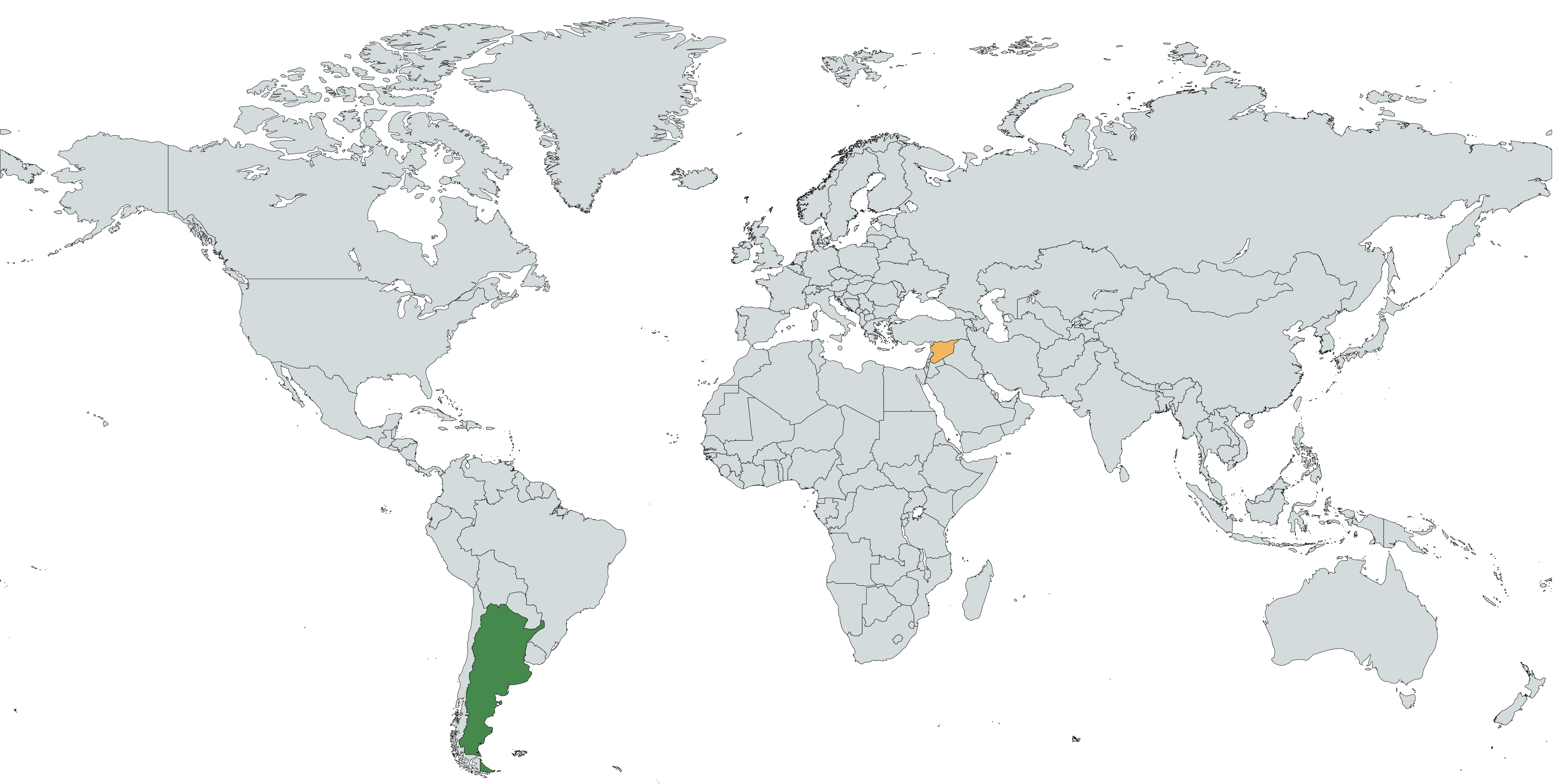
- Argentina: Syria

Diplomatic mission
- Argentine Embassy, Damascus: Syrian Embassy, Buenos Airesy

Argentina–Syria relations refer to the bilateral relationship between the Argentine Republic and the Syrian Arab Republic. Argentina maintains an embassy in Damascus, and Syria has an embassy in Buenos Aires.

Both nations share a historically friendly relationship, with significant diplomatic, cultural, and economic ties, primarily driven by the large Syrian-Lebanese community in Argentina.

== History ==
Informal ties between the countries date back to the late 19th and early 20th centuries when significant waves of Syrian immigrants arrived in Argentina as part of the broader Arab migration from the Ottoman Empire. These early Syrian migrants contributed to fostering closer relations between the two countries, forming a strong Syrian-Argentine community that has since played a key role in the relationship.

Argentina has traditionally maintained a neutral stance in the Middle East, focusing its diplomatic efforts on maintaining peaceful and cooperative relations with all countries in the region, including Syria.

Over the years, both nations have exchanged high-level visits aimed at enhancing bilateral cooperation in areas such as trade, culture, and mutual assistance.

Diplomatic relations between Argentina and Syria were officially established on 23 November 1945.

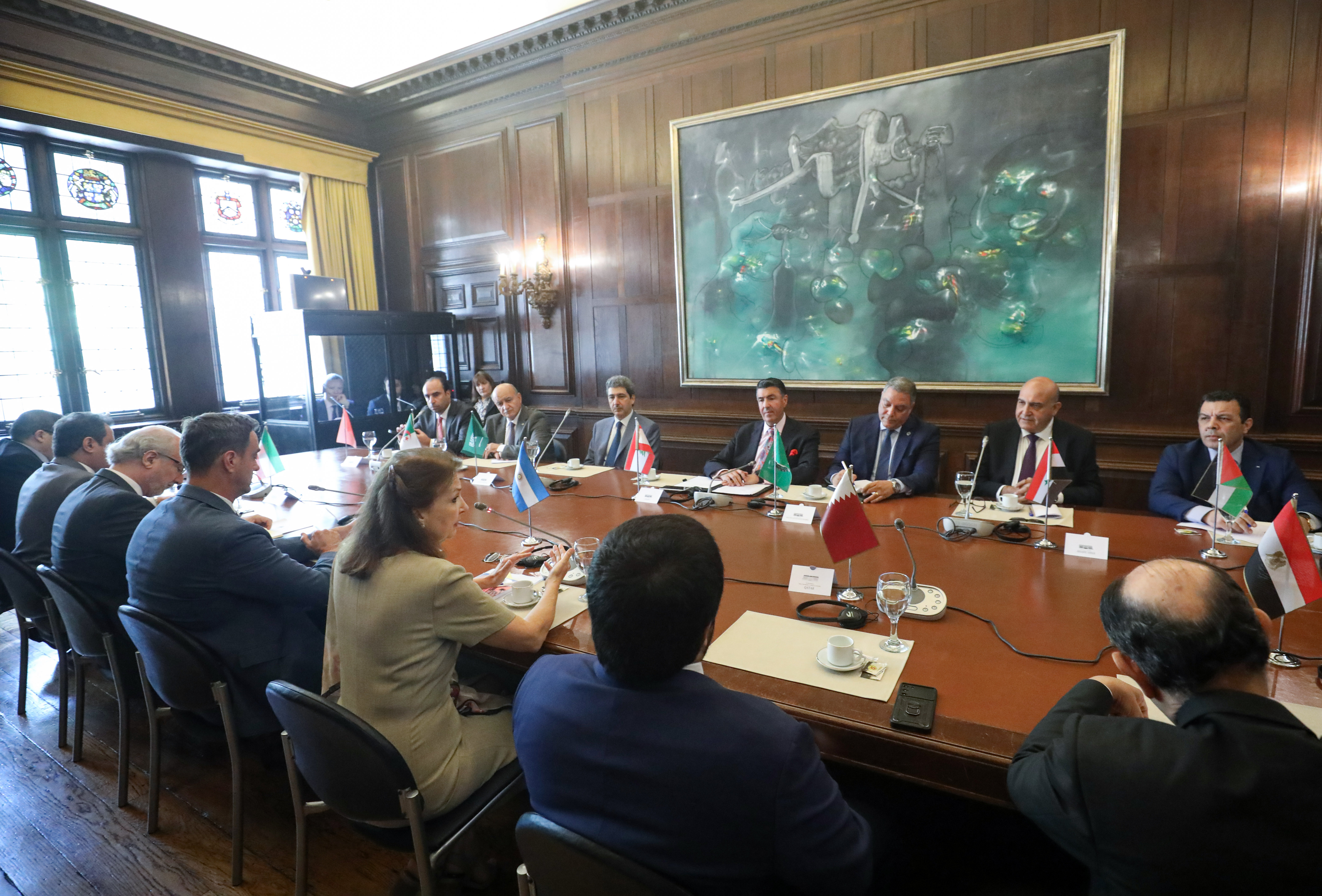
Meeting between Minister of Foreign Affairs Diana Mondino and the chiefs of missions of the Arab League members in 2024. Syrian ambassador Sami Salameh second from right.

Since the outbreak of the Syrian Civil War in 2011, Argentina has called for a peaceful resolution to the conflict through diplomatic means. While Argentina has not been directly involved in the conflict, it has expressed concern over the humanitarian situation in Syria and supported international efforts for a ceasefire and dialogue between the warring factions.

On October 2014, Argentina launched the "Programa Siria", which benefited around 100 people in order to facilitate the arrival of affected citizens by the civil war who wished to settle in the country, making it the second South American nation —after Uruguay— to adopt measures of this kind. The program offered beneficiaries an entry visa granting temporary residence and the option to apply for permanent residency. It was published in the Boletín Oficial de la República Argentina, and was originally set to run until October 21, 2015 and the measure also reached to Palestine refugees in the country.

In May 2016, Argentine Foreign Minister Susana Malcorra paid a visit to Lebanon. During her visit, she met with various local organizations assisting refugees affected by the Syrian Civil War and visited a Syrian refugee camp close to the Lebanese-Syrian border. After that, the Argentine government implemented a humanitarian visa program aimed at providing refuge for Syrians affected by the war, allowing Syrian families to seek asylum in Argentina.

== Cultural relations and diaspora ==
One of the most significant aspects of Argentina–Syria relations is the cultural and social connection facilitated by the Syrian diaspora in Argentina. The Syrian-Lebanese community in Argentina is one of the largest in Latin America, with over 3.5 million people of Syrian or Lebanese descent. This community has played an influential role in Argentine society, with notable figures in politics, business, and the arts.

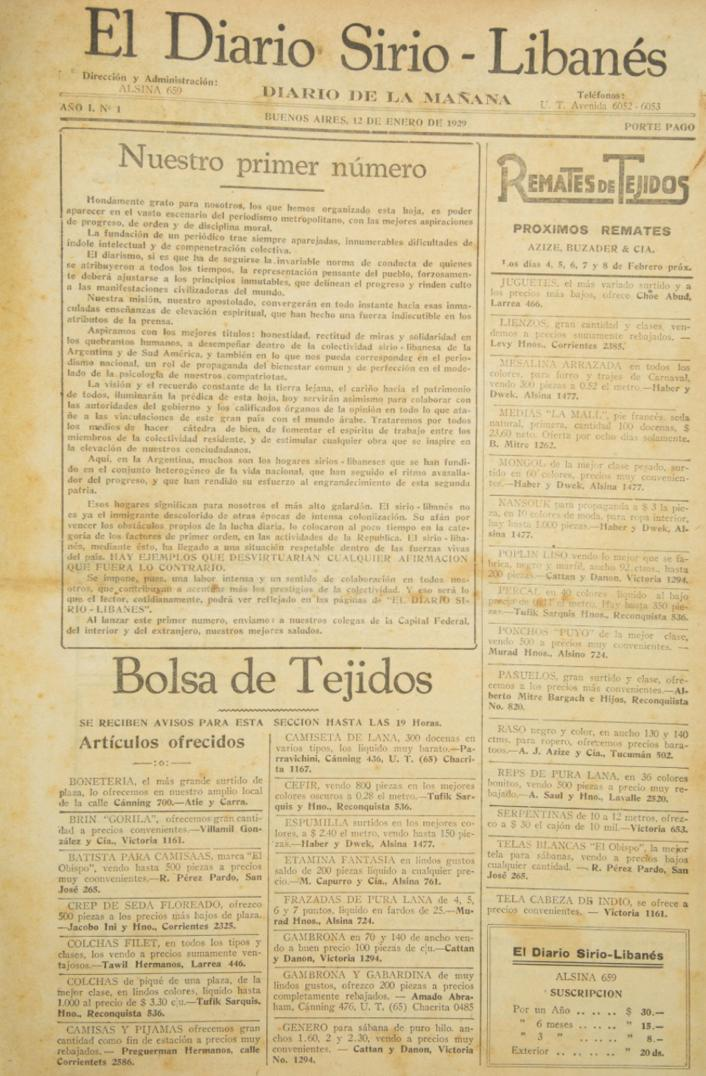
Syrian-Lebanese Newspaper, Buenos Aires, published on 29 January 1929.

Several cultural and social organizations in Argentina aim to preserve and promote Syrian culture, including the Club Sirio-Libanés in Buenos Aires, which regularly organizes cultural events, lectures, and celebrations.

== State visits ==
In 2010, Syrian President Bashar al-Assad visited Argentina and met then President Cristina Fernandez de Kirchner in Buenos Aires.

== Economic relations ==
Trade between Argentina and Syria is very low. Between June 2024 and June 2025 the exports of Syria to Argentina did not show significant variations, while imports decreased by $775k (11.5%) from $6.75M to $5.97M. with a focus on agricultural products. Argentina primarily exports wheat, corn, and other grains to Syria, while Syria exports smaller quantities of textiles, olive oil, and other agricultural goods to Argentina. In November 2025, Syria exported $0 and imported $5.76M from Argentina.Trade relations have been affected by the Syrian Civil War, which caused disruptions in Syria's economic activities and imports.

== See also ==
- Foreign relations of Argentina
- Foreign relations of Syria
- Syrian Argentines
- Lebanese Argentines
- Jaridat ar-rabita al-wataniya as-suriya, Arabic-language newspaper published in Buenos Aires from 1929 to 1934.
