= William Tapley Bennett Jr. =

American diplomat (1917–1994)

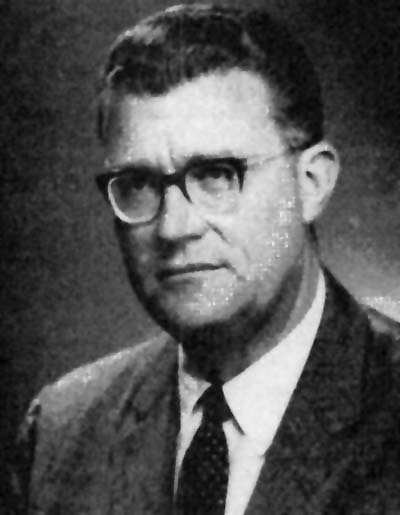
- W. Tapley Bennett, c. 1965

19th Assistant Secretary of State for Legislative Affairs
- In office November 17, 1983 – January 4, 1985
- Preceded by: Powell A. Moore
- Succeeded by: William L. Ball

12th U.S. Ambassador to NATO
- In office April 26, 1977 – March 31, 1983
- President: Jimmy Carter; Ronald Reagan
- Preceded by: Robert Strausz-Hupé
- Succeeded by: David Manker Abshire

U.S. Ambassador to Portugal
- In office July 20, 1966 – July 21, 1969
- President: Lyndon B. Johnson
- Preceded by: George W. Anderson, Jr.
- Succeeded by: Ridgway B. Knight

U.S. Ambassador to the Dominican Republic
- In office March 23, 1964 – April 13, 1966
- President: Lyndon B. Johnson
- Preceded by: John Bartlow Martin
- Succeeded by: John Hugh Crimmins

Personal details
- Born: April 1, 1917 Griffin, Georgia, U.S.
- Died: November 29, 1994 (aged 77) Washington D.C., U.S.
- Resting place: Washington National Cathedral
- Spouse: Margaret Rutherfurd White
- Education: University of Georgia; George Washington University Law School; National War College

William Tapley Bennett Jr. (April 1, 1917 – November 29, 1994) was an American diplomat who served as Ambassador to the Dominican Republic during the 1965 civil war and who recommended that President Johnson intervene with United States troops.

== Early life ==
Bennett was born in Griffin, Georgia on April 1, 1917. He was the only child of William Tapley Bennett Sr. (1891–1982) and Annie Mem (née Little) Bennett (1894–1965).

His maternal grandparents were Peyton Brantley "Mem" Little and Julia Elizabeth (née Neal) Little.

Bennett attended the University of Georgia where he was a member of the Sigma Chi fraternity. After doing graduate work at the University of Freiburg in Germany from 1937 to 1938, he returned to the United States and earned a law degree from George Washington University Law School.

== Career ==
After graduation from law school, Bennett joined the Foreign Service in 1941. He served as a United States Army intelligence officer during World War II. From 1951 to 1954, Bennett was Deputy Director to the Office of South American Affairs. From 1954 to 1955, he studied at the National War College and for two years after, he served as Special Assistant to the Under Secretary of State for Political Affairs. From 1957 to 1964, he acted as Counselor and Minister at the U.S. Embassies in Rome, Italy, in Vienna, Austria, and in Athens, Greece.

President Lyndon Johnson appointed him Ambassador to the Dominican Republic after the previous Ambassador, John Bartlow Martin, resigned after the Kennedy assassination on the very day in which Juan Bosch, then President of the Dominican Republic, was toppled in a coup d'etat. While Ambassador, Bennett "advised President Johnson and members of Congress that the revolt was led by Communists" and recommended President Johnson intervene with United States troops during the Dominican Civil War. Bennett was heavily criticized for his report and recommendation.

Reportedly "seeking relief from the tropical heat of the Dominican Republic," Johnson appointed him the Ambassador to Portugal in 1966. He served in that role until Richard Nixon became president in 1969 and he was succeeded by Ridgway B. Knight, who up until that point was the Ambassador to Belgium.

Beginning in 1972, he began to serve concurrently as Ambassador to the United Nations Security Council and Deputy United States Representative to the United Nations. After Jimmy Carter became president in 1977, Bennett was appointed the United States Permanent Representative to NATO, serving from 1977 through 1983, including when Ronald Reagan became president in 1981.

On November 14, 1983, he was appointed Assistant Secretary of State for Legislative Affairs, serving from November 17, 1983, to January 4, 1985.

=== Later career ===
After retiring in 1985 he served as adjunct professor of international law at the University of Georgia. From 1991 to 1992, he served as president of the Atlantic Treaty Association.

== Personal life ==
On June 23, 1945, Bennett was married to Margaret Rutherfurd White in Bernardsville, New Jersey. Margaret, a Foxcroft School graduate who attended Barnard College and the Institute of Musical Art of the Juilliard School of Music, was the daughter of John Campbell White (the U.S. Ambassador to Peru and Haiti), a granddaughter of Henry White (the U.S. Ambassador to France and Italy), and a niece of Jay Pierrepont Moffat, the U.S. Ambassador to Canada. Together, they were the parents of five children:

- William Tapley Bennett III of Washington, D.C.
- John Campbell White Bennett of Charleston, South Carolina, a U.S. Navy Cmdr.
- Anne B. Bennett of Lexington, Massachusetts
- Ellen Pierrepont Bennett, who married Rev. Ralph C. Godsall, the Chaplain of Trinity College, Cambridge, in 1980.
- Victoria R. Bennett of Seattle, Washington.

He died after a long illness in Washington D.C., on November 29, 1994. His remains were interred in Washington National Cathedral.

Diplomatic posts
| Preceded by John Bartlow Martin | U.S. Ambassador to the Dominican Republic; March 23, 1964 – April 13, 1966 | Succeeded by John Hugh Crimmins |
| Preceded by George W. Anderson, Jr. | U.S. Ambassador to Portugal; July 20, 1966 – July 21, 1969 | Succeeded by Ridgway B. Knight |
| Preceded by Robert Strausz-Hupé | U.S. Ambassador to NATO; April 26, 1977 – March 31, 1983 | Succeeded by David Manker Abshire |
Government offices
| Preceded by Powell A. Moore | Assistant Secretary of State for Legislative Affairs; November 17, 1983 – January 4, 1985 | Succeeded by William L. Ball |
