= Cyprus International University =

University in Turkish Republic of Northern Cyprus

- Turkish: Uluslararası Kıbrıs Üniversitesi
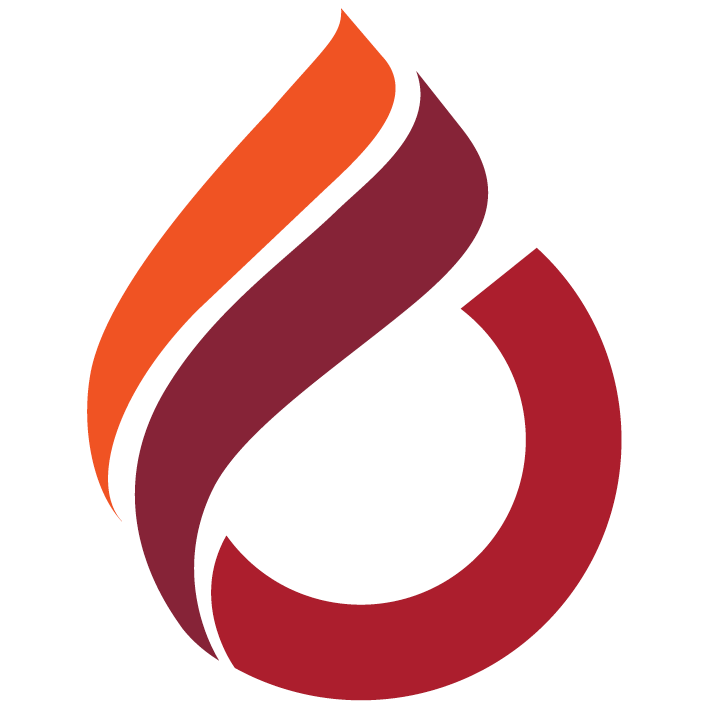
- Other name: CIU or UKÜ
- Motto: Open for open minds
- Type: Private
- Established: 1997
- Affiliations: IAU; ECPR; EAIE; NAFSA; WAUC; FUIW; ECBE
- Rector: Prof. Dr. Erbuğ Çelebi
- Students: 18,000
- Location: North Nicosia, Northern Cyprus
- Website: ciu.edu.tr

Cyprus International University (CIU; Turkish: Uluslararası Kıbrıs Üniversitesi) is an English-language private university in de-facto Northern Cyprus. It is located in the capital, North Nicosia and was established in 1997.

== History ==
Cyprus International University was established in 1997, as a result of rising interest in higher educational institutions and instruction in English, and in recognition of the increased need for universities which conduct education in foreign languages in Cyprus and other countries in the region.

CIU ranked 64th worldwide in the 2024 UI GreenMetric World University Rankings.

In the 2025 Times Higher Education (THE) Interdisciplinary Science Rankings, CIU ranked in the 601-800 range among 2,092 global institutions.

== Campus ==
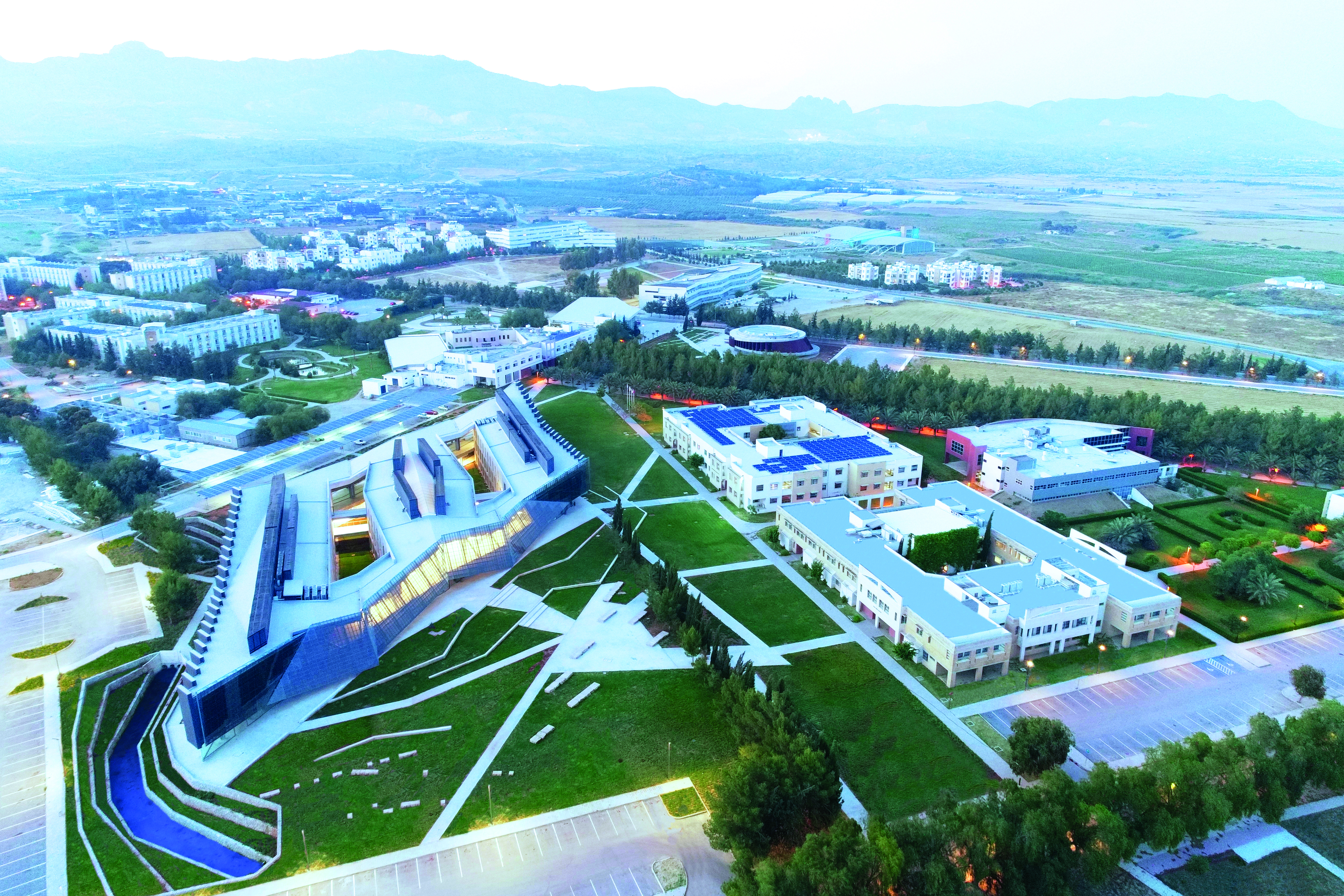
CIU Campus

Cyprus International University is in North Nicosia, the capital of self-proclaimed de-facto Northern Cyprus.

The university is situated 5 km from the city centre, 14 km from the Ercan State Airport, 50 km from the town of Famagusta, and 30 km from the coastal town of Kyrenia.

== Organization ==
=== Faculties ===
Faculty of Medicine

- Medicine

Faculty of Dentistry

- Dentistry

Faculty of Pharmacy

- Pharmacy

Faculty of Education

- Computer and Instructional Technology Teacher Education
- English Language Teaching
- The Pre-School Teacher Education
- and Psychological Counselling
- Arts Education and Crafts Teaching
- Classroom Teaching
- Turkish Language Teaching
- Mentally Handicapped Teaching

Faculty of Arts and Sciences

- Psychology
- Turkish Language and Literature

Faculty of Fine Arts

- Industrial Product Design
- Graphic Design
- Interior Design
- Architecture

Faculty of Law

- Law

Faculty of Economics and Administrative Sciences

- European Union Relations
- Business Administration
- Social Work
- International Relations

Faculty of Communication

- Journalism
- Visual Communication Design
- Radio and Television
- Advertising and Public Relations

Faculty of Engineering

- Computer Engineering.
- Informations System Engineering
- Bioengineering
- Environmental Engineering
- Electric and Electronics Engineering
- Industrial Engineering
- Engineering Management
- Energy Systems Engineering
- Petroleum and Natural gas Engineering
- Civil Engineering
- Mechanical Engineering

Faculty of Health Sciences

- Physical Therapy and Rehabilitation
- Nutrition and Dietetics

Faculty of Agricultural Sciences and Technologies

- Biosystems Engineering
- Plant Production and Technologies

=== Institutes ===
- Master Programs
- PhD Programs

=== Schools ===
- The School of Justice
- Vocational School
- Vocational School of Health Services
- Tourism and Hotel Management
- School of Applied Sciences
- School of Foreign Languages

== Academic profile ==
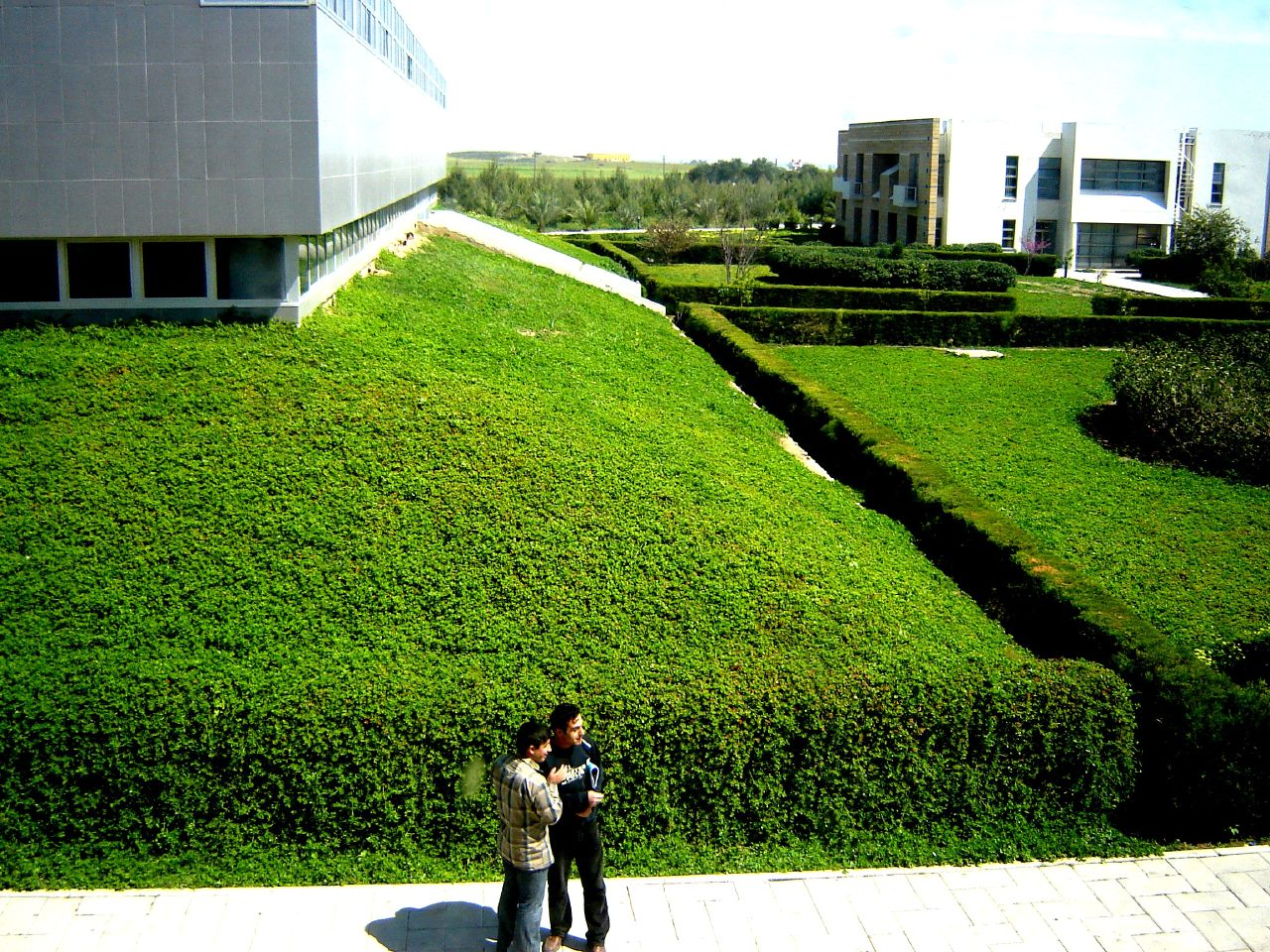
A view from the Cyprus International University campus

=== Research ===
Cyprus International University is home to the following research centers:

- Center of Environmental Research
- Center of Cyprus Studies
- Center for Social and Strategic Policy Research (CIU CSSPR)
- CIU Center for Underwater Archeology and Imaging
- Center for Cultural Heritage Research
- Biotechnology Research Center
- Communication Technologies Research Center
- The Cyprus Bee and Bee Products Research Center
- The Center for Applied Research in Business Economics and Technology
- Cyprus and Mediterranean Studies Center
- Women And Gender Studies Research Center
- Women And Gender Studies Research Center

=== Continuing Education Center ===
The Continuing Education Center in CIU, is the unit that maintains the arrangement, coordination and execution of education programs which are prepared to be served to society.

=== Library ===
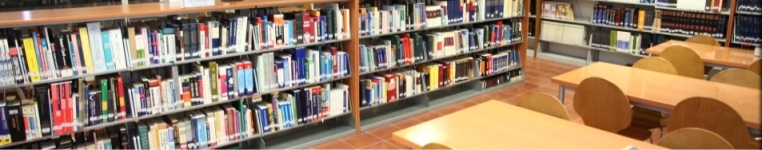
The CIU Library

The CIU Library provides opportunities for students, academic, and administrative staff to benefit from library services by joining for free. There is a huge collection which consists of books, e-books, journals, magazines, CDs, video tapes, floppy disks, and academic internet sources in the library.

=== CIU FM 107.2 ===
CIU FM gives the opportunity to the Communication Faculty students to practice; especially in radio programming, broadcasting and radio station management.

=== Affiliations ===
Cyprus International University is a full member of institutions and organizations such as;

- North Cyprus Higher Education Planning, Evaluation, Accreditation and Coordination Council (YÖDAK)
- Turkish Republic Council of Higher Education (YÖK)
- International Association of Universities (IAU)
- European Consortium for Political Research (ECPR)
- European Association for International Education (EAIE)
- Association of International Educators (NAFSA)
- World Association of Universities and Colleges (WAUC)
- Federation of the Universities of the Islamic World (FUIW)
- European Council for Business Education (ECBE)
- Council on Hotel, Restaurant and Institutional Educational (CHRIE)
- International Society for Engineering Education (IGIP)
- National Recognation Information Centre for The United Kingdom (UK NARIC)
- Association for Evaluation and Accreditation of Engineering Programs (MÜDEK)

== Student life ==
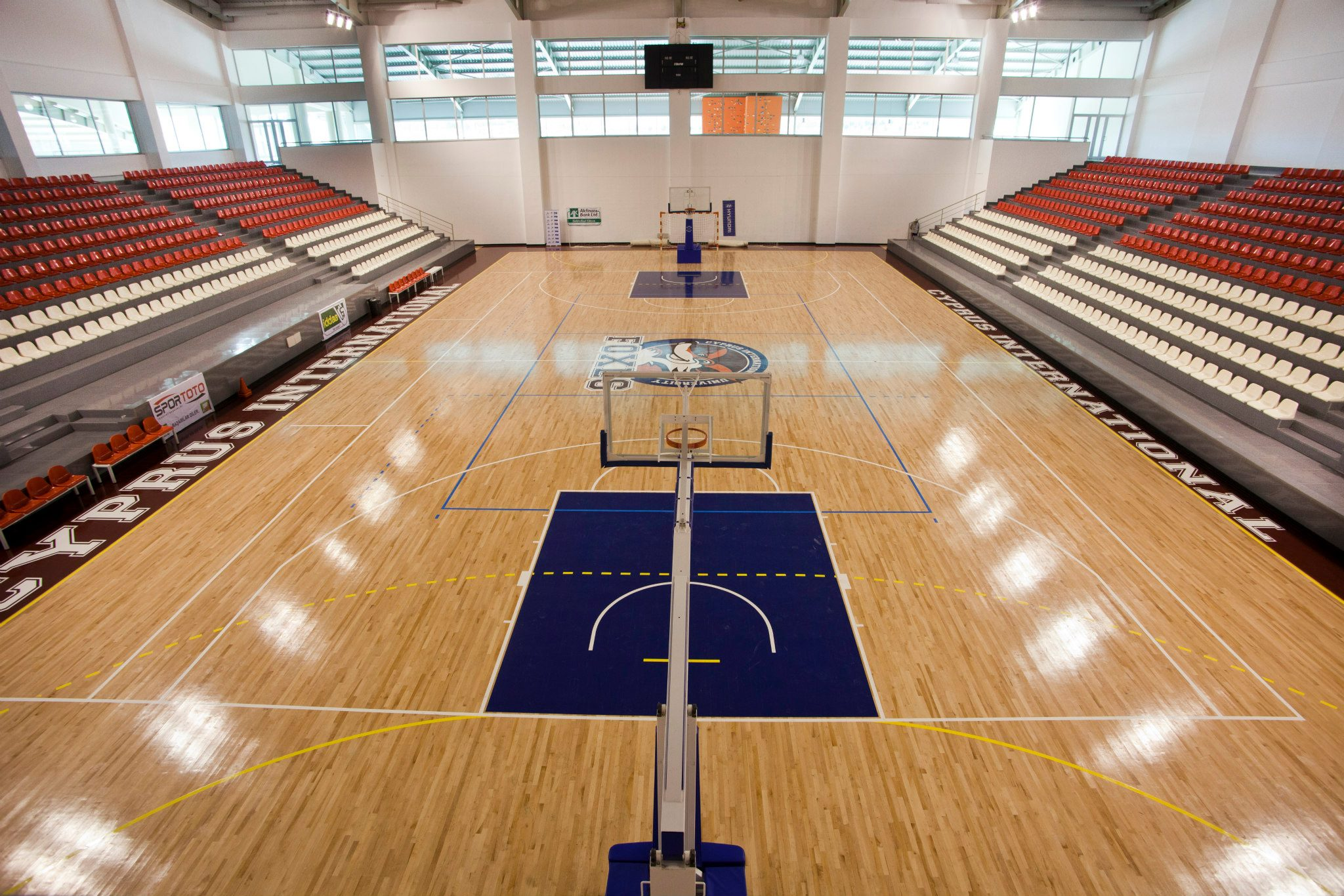
The basketball field at CIU Arena

CIU's student body represents over 64 different countries, and there are a number of student clubs catering to the interests of students outside of pure academy.

=== CIU Arena ===
CIU Arena which is the first integrated sport complex and also the largest sporting facility in TRNC consists of 7500 m^{2} indoor and 15.000 m^{2} outdoor area. The complex which has the capacity of 1710 spectators, consists of a professional and inclusive fitness room, indoor sport hall (1540 capacity), indoor swimming pool (semi- Olympic, 170 capacity), table-tennis, aerobic gall, wall bars, shooting circle, squash, club rooms, cafe, health centre, changing rooms, offices, classrooms, etc.
