= Embassy of the United States, Damascus =

Diplomatic mission of the United States of America in the Syrian Arab Republic

- Location: Damascus, Syria
- Address: 2 Al Mansour St.
- Coordinates: 33.5217°N 36.2811°E
- Opening: September 30, 1952; 73 years ago
- Closed: February 6, 2012
- Ambassador: Vacant
- Jurisdiction: Syria
- Website: sy.usembassy.gov

The Embassy of the United States of America in Damascus (Arabic: سفارة الولايات المتحدة الأمريكية في دمشق, romanized: Safārah al-Wilāyāt al-Muttaḥidah al-Amrīkīyah fī Dimashq) is the diplomatic mission of the United States of America to Syria. Opened in 1952, the embassy complex is located in Damascus.

== History ==
=== Establishment ===
The US and Syria established diplomatic relations in 1944 when the US recognized Syrian independence. Then on September 30, 1952, the U.S. delegation in Damascus was upgraded to embassy status, officially establishing an American embassy in Damascus. The embassy briefly became a consulate from 1958 to 1961 while Syria was a part of the United Arab Republic. The building returned to its embassy status once the US again recognized Syria following the resumption of Syrian independence.

=== 2006 bombing ===
On September 12, 2006, the U.S. Embassy was attacked by four armed assailants with guns, grenades and a car bomb (which failed to detonate). Syrian Security Forces successfully countered the attack, killing three attackers and injuring one. Two other Syrians killed during the attack were a government security guard and a passerby. The Syrian government publicly stated that terrorists had carried out the attack. The U.S. government did not receive an official Syrian government assessment of the motives or organization behind the attack, but security was upgraded at U.S. facilities. The Syrian ambassador to the U.S., Imad Moustapha, blamed the attack on Jund al-Sham, but Syrian President Bashar al-Assad blamed U.S. foreign policy in the region as contributing to the incident.

=== Syrian civil war ===
In 2012, Syria–United States relations broke off due to disagreements relating to the Syrian civil war, and this embassy was officially suspended on February 6. Since then, much of the functions of the embassy was replaced by the Czech embassy in Damascus.

Since the fall of the Assad regime in December 2024, the US has been in contact with the new Syrian transitional government, but also made clear that it had no immediate plans on reopening its embassy in Damascus.

In March 2025, the embassy advised all Americans to leave Syria due to escalating violence in the country.

On May 29, 2025, U.S. Ambassador to Turkey and Special envoy to Syria Tom Barrack arrived at the embassy building as the American flag was raised there for the first time since 2012. Though the embassy did not reopen, it was a "significant signal of warming relations" between Syria and the United States.

== See also ==
- List of ambassadors of the United States to Syria
- Embassy of Syria, Washington D.C.
- List of diplomatic missions in Syria
- List of diplomatic missions of the United States
