= Teir Maalah =

Teir Maalah تير معلة
- Village
- Location in Syria
- Coordinates: 34°48′8″N 36°42′25″E
- Country: Syria
- Governorate: Homs
- District: Homs
- Subdistrict: Homs
- Elevation: 479 m (1,572 ft)

Population (2004)
  - Total: 7,728
- Time zone: UTC+2 (EET)
  - Summer (DST): +3

Teir Maalah (Arabic: تير معلة, also spelled Teir Maela or Ter Maala or Ter Maaleh) is a town in central Syria, administratively part of the Homs Governorate, just north of Homs. Other Nearby localities include al-Dar al-Kabirah to the southwest, al-Ghantoo to the northwest, Talbiseh to the north and al-Mukhtariyah. According to the Central Bureau of Statistics (CBS), Teir Maalah had a population of 7,728 in the 2004 census.

The inhabitants of Teir Maalah had frequently joined demonstrations protesting the Syrian government, during the early stages of the Syrian uprising which began in March 2011. According to opposition activists and witnesses, the Syrian Army sealed off the roads leading to Teir Maalah, as well as Talbiseh and al-Rastan, before assaulting the towns with tanks, which resulted in over 100 wounded.

Ter Maalah is one of the settings in Riad Sattouf's The Arab of the Future series.
