= Jaridat ar-rabita al-wataniya as-suriya =

Arabic language newspaper published in Argentina 1929-1934

Jaridat ar Rabita al Wataniya as Suriya
- Publisher: Khalil Saadeh
- Founded: 1929
- Ceased publication: 1934
- Political alignment: Syrian nationalist
- Language: Arabic
- Headquarters: Buenos Aires

Jaridat ar Rabita al Wataniya as Suriya (Arabic: جريدة الرابطة الوطنية السورية, 'Newspaper of the Syrian National League') was an Arabic-language newspaper published in Buenos Aires from 1929 to 1934. The paper was published by Khalil Saadeh, the father of Lebanese politician and writer Antun Saadeh.
