= European Council for Business Education =

- Abbreviation: ECBE
- Formation: 1995
- Type: NGO
- Legal status: International Non-Profit Association
- Location: Brussels
- Website: www.ecbe.eu

The European Council for Business Education (ECBE) is a non profit organisation headquartered in Belgium. It delivers unrecognised private accreditation to private and public business schools and universities.

== Accreditation validity ==
- ECBE delivers non-governmental private accreditations. ECBE's accreditation standards and procedures are based on the European Standards and Guidelines (ESG) as part of the Bologna Process, but the organization is not registered with EQAR and its accreditation is therefore not considered equivalent to a state accreditation.
- ECBE's educational accreditation process is based upon self and peer evaluation.
- ECBE is overseen by a Board of Directors elected from the members. A separate Board of Commissioners oversees the application of procedures and accreditation awarding.
- Formal affiliations of ECBE: ECBE is cited as a registered affiliate of the European Association for Quality Assurance in Higher Education (ENQA). ECBE is not a member of the American Council for Higher Education Accreditation (CHEA).
