= Thomas J. Scotes =

American diplomat

Thomas James Scotes (born January 6, 1932 Hagerstown, Maryland) was a career U.S. Foreign Service Officer and was the U.S. Ambassador to Yemen (1975-1978) and Chargé d'Affaires ad interim to Syria (Began June 16, 1974). Since he retired, he's been a consultant and Vice President of the Hellenic American Union in Athens, Greece.

When he was nominated to be Ambassador, Scotes was considered a specialist on Arab affairs and was deputy chief of mission in Damascus.

== Biography ==
Scotes grew up in Harrisburg, Pennsylvania and attended the Harrisburg public schools. He earned an A.B. in History with honors from the University of Pennsylvania in 1953.

== Publications ==
A Weft of Memory: A Greek Mother’s Recollection of Folksongs, Poems and Proverbs Aug 8, 2017
