= Embassy of Syria, Washington, D.C. =

Embassy of Syria

Embassy of the Syrian Arab Republic in Washington, D.C. سفارة الجمهورية العربية السورية في واشنطن
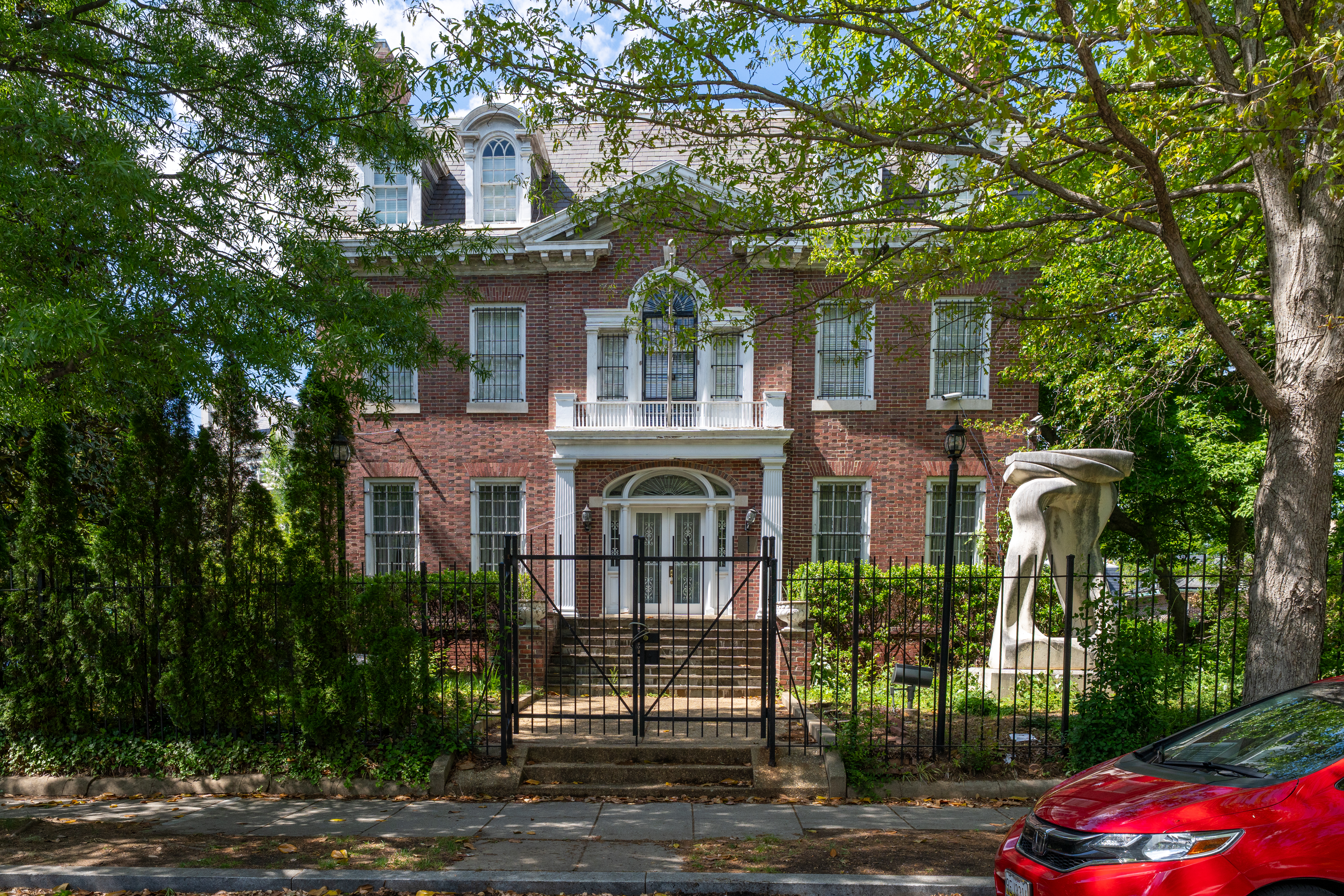
- The embassy in 2026
- Location: Washington, D.C.
- Address: 2215 Wyoming Avenue NW
- Coordinates: 38°55′1.1″N 77°3′1.4″W
- Jurisdiction: United States
- Chargé d'affaires: Mohammed Qanatri

The Embassy of Syria in Washington, D.C. (Arabic: سفارة الجمهورية العربية السورية في واشنطن) is the diplomatic mission of the Syrian Arab Republic to the United States. An ambassador has not been named.

The Syrian embassy along with two honorary consulates in Troy, Michigan and Houston, Texas were ordered to suspend operations on March 18, 2014, by U.S. special envoy for Syria Daniel Rubinstein, who stated that "We have determined it is unacceptable for individuals appointed by that regime to conduct diplomatic or consular operations in the United States".

The embassy did not reopen until 2025, following the fall of the Assad regime and the restoration of diplomatic relations between the United States and Syria.

== History ==
The building is notable for being the home of former US President William Howard Taft, who died in the building on March 8, 1930. He had lived in this house for 9 years. The building, constructed in 1908 and designed by noted architect Appleton P. Clark, Jr., is located at 2215 Wyoming Avenue in the Kalorama neighborhood of Washington, D.C.

=== Syrian Civil War ===
During February 2012, large scale protests were held at the embassy, condemning the alleged "violent government crackdown" against the popular uprising taking place in Syria, which would become the beginning of the Syrian Civil War. These protests were caused partially by the rejection of China and Russia of a proposed resolution, during a UNSC emergency session. Such protests occurred in other Syrian embassies worldwide, such as London and Istanbul.

While the Syrian embassy remained open after the Assad government's crackdown upon Arab Spring protestors, Syrian diplomat Bassam Barabandi was actively working with the Syrian Opposition and United States government to aid opposition figures with passports and provide information regarding the government. The United States subsequently recognized the diplomatic mission of the National Coalition for Syrian Revolutionary and Opposition Forces on May 5, 2014.

On December 8, 2024, the Assad regime fell following the Syrian opposition offensives. Eight days later, on December 16, an event was held outside the closed chancery calling for peace in Syria. Attendees included Debra Tice, the mother of Austin Tice, an American journalist who was kidnapped in Syria while reporting on the civil war. The Syrian embassy was reopened on September 19, 2025, with Syrian Foreign Minister Asaad al-Shaibani raised the new Syrian flag over the chancery. At the end of January 2026, the Syrian Ministry of Foreign Affairs appointed Mohammed Qanatri as Syria's new chargé d'affaires to the United States, without officially announcing the appointment.

== See also ==
- Embassy of the United States, Damascus
- Syria-United States relations
- List of diplomatic missions in Washington, D.C.
- Ambassador of Syria to the United States
