= Imad Moustapha =

Former Syrian Ambassador to China and the United States

Imad Moustapha عماد مصطفى
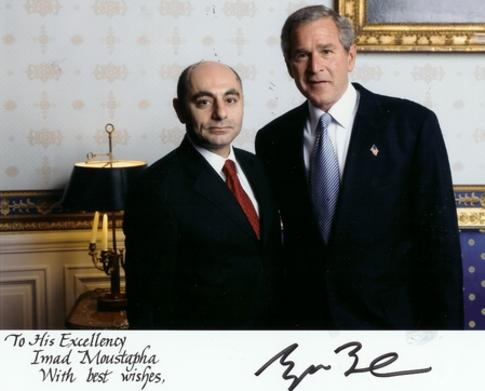
- Dr. Imad Moustapha (left) and U.S. President George W. Bush

5th Ambassador of Syria to China
- In office December 2011 – February 2022
- Succeeded by: Mohammad Hassaneh Khalil Haddam

9th Ambassador of Syria to the United States
- In office 1 January 2004 – December 2011
- Preceded by: Rostom Al-Zoubi
- Succeeded by: Zuheir Jabbour

Personal details
- Born: 11 March 1961 (age 65) Aleppo, Syria
- Spouse: Rafif
- Children: Sidra, Saree
- Profession: Civil Servant, Diplomat
- Website: http://imad_moustapha.blogs.com/

Imad Moustapha (Arabic: عماد مصطفى; born 11 March 1961) is a former Syrian Ambassador to China and the United States.

== Biography ==
Imad Moustapha was born in Aleppo on 11 March 1961.

He was Dean of the Faculty of Information Technology (IT) at the University of Damascus, and Secretary General of the Arab School on Science and Technology. He is a co-founder of the Network of Syrian Scientists, Technologists and Innovators Abroad (NOSSTIA). This organization was involved in establishing Meedan, "a non-profit social technology company which aims to increase cross-language interaction on the web, with particular emphasis on translation and aggregation services in Arabic and English."

== Media ==
Imad Moustapha regularly writes in the print media and appears on television, representing the Syrian government position. He has also occasionally appeared at public lectures, think-tanks, and world-affairs councils.

== Personal ==
His wide range of interests include: globalization, cultural identities, social and economic impacts of the Internet, and Western classical music.

== Allegations of espionage ==
On 25 June 2011, the Washington Bureau chief of Kuwaiti newspaper Al Rai reported in NOW Lebanon that Ambassador Mustapha was engaged in various espionage activities, as well as threats to Syrians living in the US. Facing possible repercussions from an FBI investigation into the matter, Mustapha moved to China in February 2012. According to CNN political analyst Josh Rogin in 2017, before Mustapha departed for Beijing he had left in place a network of friends, Syrian Americans and others who had close ties to the regime and would lobby on Bashar al-Assad's behalf.

== See also ==
- University of Damascus
- United Nations Development Program
- United Nations Educational, Scientific and Cultural Organization (UNESCO)
- United Nations Economic and Social Commission for Western Asia
