= Syria–United States relations =

- Syria: United States

Diplomatic mission
- Embassy of Syria, Washington, D.C.: Embassy of the United States, Damascus

Diplomatic relations between Syria and the United States began in 1835, suspended in 2012 after the onset of the Syrian civil war, and reopened in September 2025. Priority issues between the two states include the Arab–Israeli conflict, the Golan Heights annexation, alleged state-sponsorship of terrorism, etc. As of 2026, the United States had begun to work with the new Syrian government after the collapse of the former regime under the Assad family and relations have improved.

The US government added Ba'athist Syria, which seized power in 1963, to its first list of "State Sponsors of Terrorism" in 1979, over its funding of Palestinian and other insurgent factions in the region. Syria is the only country from the original 1979 list to remain continuously on the list to the present day, in large part due to its support of Hezbollah. From the period of the "war on terror", the U.S. government has imposed a series of economic sanctions on Syria. These include legislatively mandated penalties, including export sanctions and ineligibility to receive most forms of U.S. aid or to purchase U.S. military equipment.

After the government crackdown on 2011 Syrian revolution, the US (alongside the European Union and Arab League) withdrew diplomatic recognition of Bashar al-Assad and imposed further sanctions against his government. According to the 2012 U.S. Global Leadership Report, through a poll conducted during the Syrian civil war, 29% of Syrians approve of U.S. leadership, with 40% disapproving and 31% uncertain.

From the early stages of the conflict in Syria in 2011, the US and its allies have provided political, military and logistic support to the Syrian opposition and demanded the removal of Bashar al-Assad from power as a pre-requisite to any political solution in the country. Since 2012, United States has recognized the Syrian National Revolutionary Coalition (SNRC) as "the legitimate representative" of the Syrian government. In May 2014, SNRC's diplomatic offices were accredited by the US as its official foreign mission to Syria.

During his visit to the Middle East in 2025, Trump announced lifting all sanctions on Syria and began the process of normalizing relations between the two countries. Ahmed al-Sharaa visited the United States on September 22, 2025, to address the 80th session of the United Nations General Assembly in New York, marking the first time in 60 years that a Syrian leader visits the US. He also visited the White House in November of the same year, becoming the first Syrian leader to do so.

== History ==
=== 1835–1943 ===
The official relations began in 1835 when the United States first appointed U.S. consuls to Aleppo which was then a part of the Ottoman Empire. After Syrian independence was declared in 1941 the United States established a consulate in Damascus. On September 7, 1943, the United States recognized an independent Syria, appointing George Wadsworth to the diplomatic mission.

=== 1957–1990 ===
Ba'athist Syria–United States relations

- Syria: United States

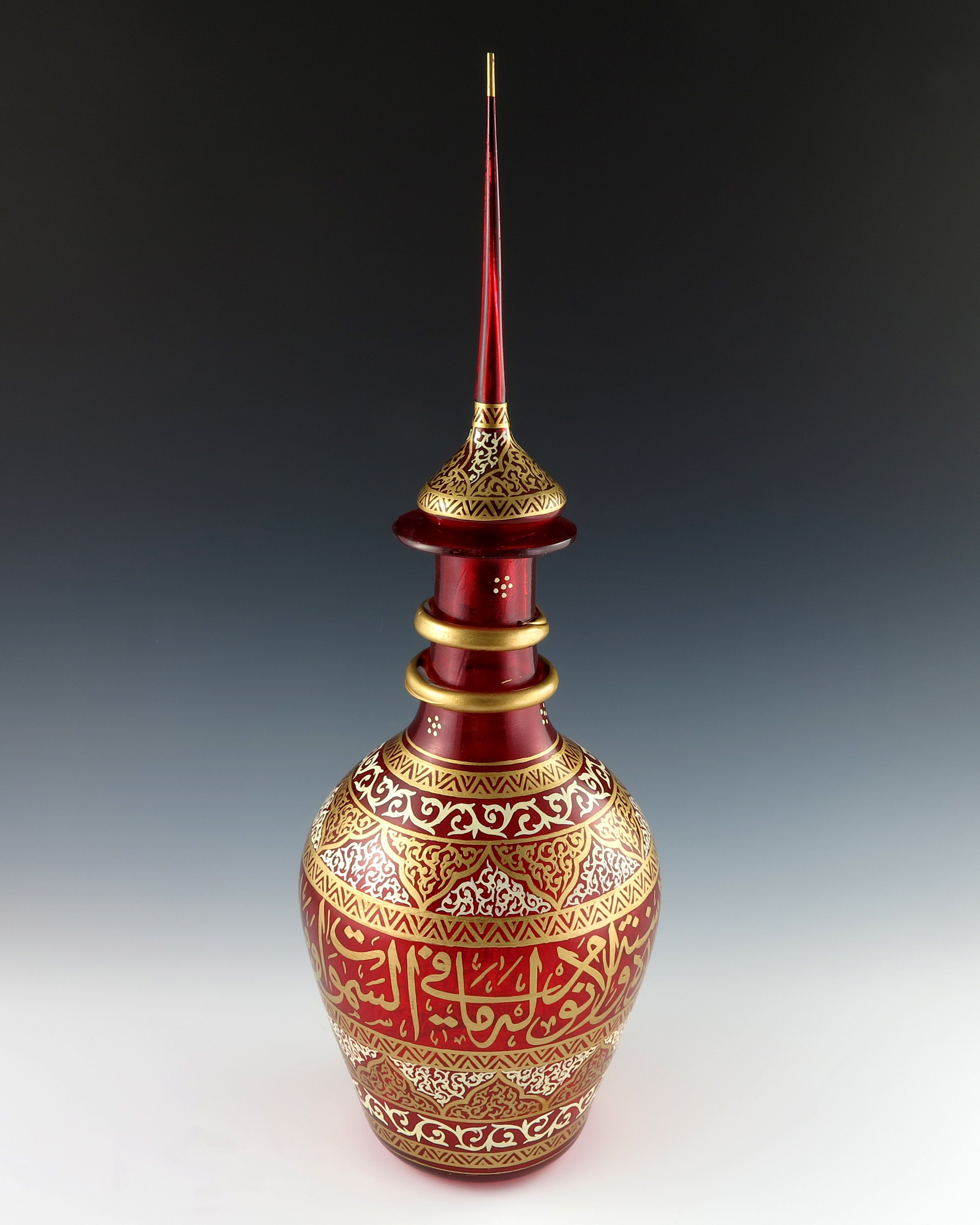
A decanter gifted to United States president Gerald Ford in 1974 from Abdul Halim Khaddam, the Deputy Prime Minister of Foreign Affairs of Syria at the time.

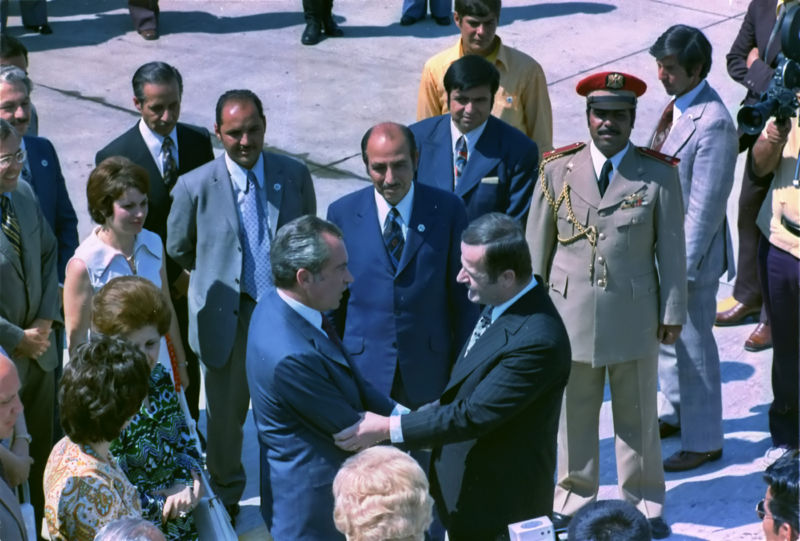
Syrian president Hafez al-Assad greets U.S. president Richard Nixon in Damascus, 1974

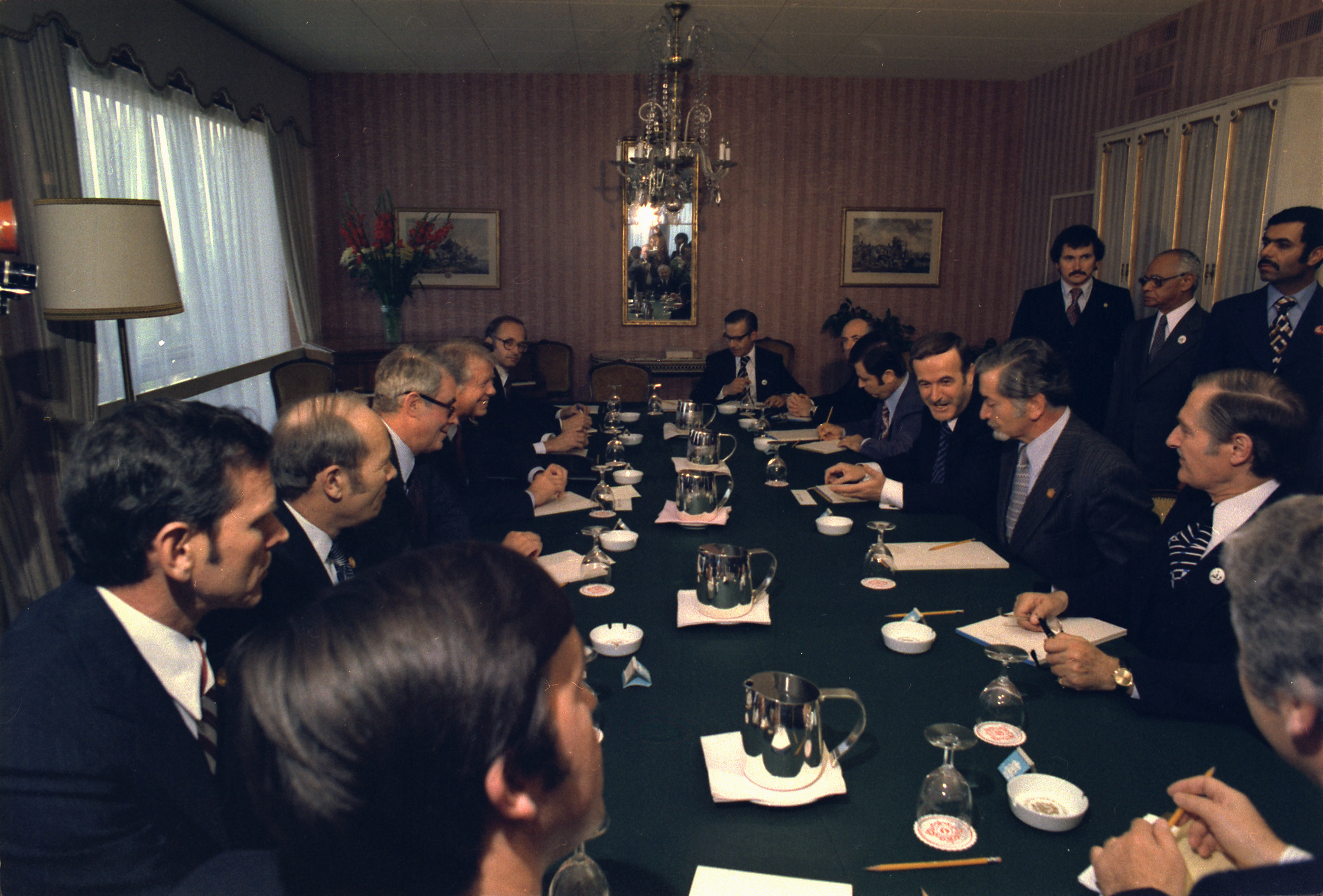
Syrian president Hafez al-Assad meets U.S. president Jimmy Carter in Geneva, 1977

As a result of a failed 1957 CIA coup attempt to topple Syrian president Shukri al-Quwatli, Syria asked US ambassador James S. Moose to leave Damascus. In return Syrian ambassador Faris Zain al-Din was recalled to Syria. Following the 1961 Syrian coup, there was a brief period of warm relations between the United States and the Syrian Arab Republic.

In 1967, U.S.–Syrian relations were severed again after the Six-Day War which resulted in Israel's occupation of the Golan Heights. Following the achievement of the Agreement on Disengagement between Israel and Syria, relations resumed in June 1974, and, afterwards, U.S. president Richard Nixon visited Damascus on an official trip to meet President Hafez al-Assad. On May 9, 1977, President al-Assad met U.S. president Jimmy Carter in Geneva to discuss the Arab–Israeli conflict.

Syria was added to the U.S. list of state sponsors of terrorism on the list's inception in 1979. In a 1986 interview on CNN, former US Secretary of State Alexander Haig, when asked which country he regarded as the world's worst state sponsor of terrorism, answered "unquestionably Syria." Also in 1986, the U.S. withdrew its ambassador and imposed additional administrative sanctions on Syria in response to evidence of direct Syrian involvement in an attempt to blow up an Israeli airplane. A U.S. ambassador returned to Damascus in 1987, partially in response to positive Syrian actions against terrorism such as expelling the Abu Nidal Organization from Syria and helping free an American hostage earlier that year.

=== 1990–2000 ===
During the Gulf War in 1990–91, Syria cooperated with the United States as a member of the multinational coalition of forces. The U.S. and Syria also consulted closely on the Taif Accord, ending the Lebanese Civil War.

In 1991, Syrian president Hafez al-Assad made a historic decision to accept then-President Bush's invitation to attend a Middle East peace conference and to engage in subsequent bilateral negotiations with Israel. Syria improved its relations with the United States by securing the release of Western hostages held in Lebanon and lifting the travel restrictions on Syrian Jews.

Throughout the Clinton administration there were multiple attempts to engage al-Assad in Middle East peace negotiations. These include several presidential summits including a visit by President Bill Clinton to Syria in 1994; the last one occurred when then-President Bill Clinton met President Hafez al-Assad in Geneva in March 2000.

=== 2001–2008 ===
In the aftermath of the September 11 attacks in the United States in 2001, the Syrian government began limited cooperation with U.S. in the war on terror. In one such case, Syrian intelligence alerted the U.S. of an al-Qaeda plan similar to the USS Cole bombing, which was to fly a hang glider loaded with explosives into the U.S. Navy's Fifth Fleet headquarters in Bahrain.

Syria's opposition to the Iraq War deteriorated relations. Serious contention arose because the Syrian government failed to prevent foreign fighters from using Syrian borders to enter Iraq and refused to deport the elements from the former Saddam Hussein government that supported the Iraqi insurgency. In turn, Syrian officials had concerns due to the high influx of Iraqi refugees into their country. In May 2003, the U.S. secretary of state, Colin Powell, visited Damascus to demand Syrian closure of the offices of Hamas, Islamic Jihad and the Popular Front for the Liberation of Palestine.

Issues of U.S. concern include its ongoing interference in Lebanese affairs, its protection of the leadership of Palestinian rejectionist groups in Damascus, its human rights record, and its pursuit of weapons of mass destruction. Relations diminished after the assassination of former Lebanese prime minister Rafik Hariri. In February 2005, in the wake of the Hariri assassination, the U.S. recalled its ambassador to Washington.

==== Syria Accountability and Lebanese Sovereignty Restoration Act ====
The 2003 Syria Accountability and Lebanese Sovereignty Restoration Act imposed sanctions on Syria, banning the majority of exports to Syria except food and medicine, specifically prohibiting the export of most goods containing more than 10% U.S.-manufactured component parts to Syria.

==== Economic sanctions ====
A series of executive orders targeting Syria's government were enacted by President George W. Bush which included Executive Orders 13315, 13224, 13382, 13338, 13399, 13441, and 13460. These sanctions are imposed on certain Syrian citizens or entities due to their participation in terrorism, acts of public corruption, or their destabilizing activities in Iraq and Lebanon. In May 2004, a new comprehensive set of economic sanctions were enacted under the Bush administration by Executive Order 13338.

==== 2006 US Embassy bombing attempt in Damascus ====
On September 12, 2006, the U.S. Embassy was attacked by four armed assailants with guns, grenades and a car bomb (which failed to detonate). Syrian Security Forces successfully countered the attack, killing three attackers and injuring one. Two other Syrians killed during the attack were a government security guard and a passerby. The Syrian government publicly stated that terrorists had carried out the attack. The U.S. government did not receive an official Syrian government assessment of the motives or organization behind the attack, but security was upgraded at U.S. facilities. The Syrian ambassador to the U.S., Imad Moustapha, blamed the attack on Jund al-Sham; meanwhile, President Bashar al-Assad, however, blamed U.S. foreign policy in the region as contributing to the incident.

==== Al-Qaeda, Iraq, and foreign fighters ====
The U.S. has also blamed Syria for the movement of foreign al-Qaeda affiliates into Iraq. The movement of these foreign fighters peaked between 2005 and 2007; however, Syria attempted to decrease such movement through increased monitoring of borders, and improved screening practices of those crossing the border. After 2009, the Syrian government indicated willingness to increase border security cooperation between Iraqi and US forces.

In 2008, the CIA and the U.S. Joint Special Operations Command (JSOC) carried out a paramilitary raid targeting al-Qaeda in Iraq in the town of Sukkariyeh in Abu Kamal. Subsequent reports revealed that nearly a dozen similar operations had taken place in Syria, Pakistan, and elsewhere since a 2004 classified executive order, the Al Qaeda Network Exord, permitted such missions, stipulating that those in sensitive countries such as Syria and Pakistan required presidential approval.

==== Support for democratic opposition ====
Diplomatic cables between the US embassy in Damascus and the State Department that were released by WikiLeaks in 2011 revealed that, starting during the presidency of George W. Bush, the US gave financial support to political opposition groups and related projects, at least through September 2010. The cables were sent because embassy staff became worried as Syrian intelligence agents were investigating these programs. The financing included $6 million to the Barada TV satellite channel which broadcast anti-government programming into Syria. Barada was closely affiliated with the Movement for Justice and Development, a London-based network of Syrian exiles.

== Contemporary era (since 2009) ==
=== Obama administration (2009–2017) ===
The Obama administration initiated a policy of rapprochement with Syria. However, with the governments' violent response to the Syrian civil war in 2011, relations cooled dramatically and senior American officials, including President Obama himself, repeatedly called for Syrian president Bashar al-Assad to resign.

Syria has publicly condemned international terrorist attacks, as it denies any involvement in Hariri killing. According to the Council on Foreign Relations in 2010, Syria actively barred any Syrian-based terrorist attacks and targeting of Westerners, instead providing “passive support” to groups it deems as legitimate resistance movements. The United States characterizes this as providing safe-havens for terrorist groups, as the Syrian government allows groups such as Hamas, Palestinian Islamic Jihad, and the Popular Front for the Liberation of Palestine-General Command to operate within its borders. The U.S. believes that Syria provides tactical and political support to these groups and in April 2010 condemned Syria as it believed it provides SCUD missiles to Hezbollah forces in Lebanon.

==== Lifting of travel restrictions ====
In February 2010 the US travel advisory for American citizens traveling to Syria was lifted. The advisory had been in place since the 2006 embassy bombing attempt. The US Embassy in Syria reported that, "After carefully assessing the current situation in Syria, we determined that circumstances didn't merit extending the travel warning.” This move was seen by many as one of the first steps towards better bilateral relations.

==== Re-engagement ====
On February 17, 2010, U.S. president Barack Obama appointed American diplomat Robert Stephen Ford to serve as the new U.S. ambassador to Syria, the first since 2005 in the aftermath of the Hariri assassination. Shortly after Ford's appointment, Under Secretary of State for Political Affairs William J. Burns arrived in Damascus and hosted talks with President Bashar al-Assad in an attempt to revive relations. The talks were described as "candid" and that common ground was met on those issues pertaining to Iraq and Lebanon. In July 2010, Senator Arlen Specter met with al-Assad in attempts to further continue the new dialogue. In meetings revolved around discussing "specific steps to promote regional stability, revive Syria–Israel peace talks, and strengthen U.S.–Syrian bilateral relations."

==== Reaction to Syrian civil war ====
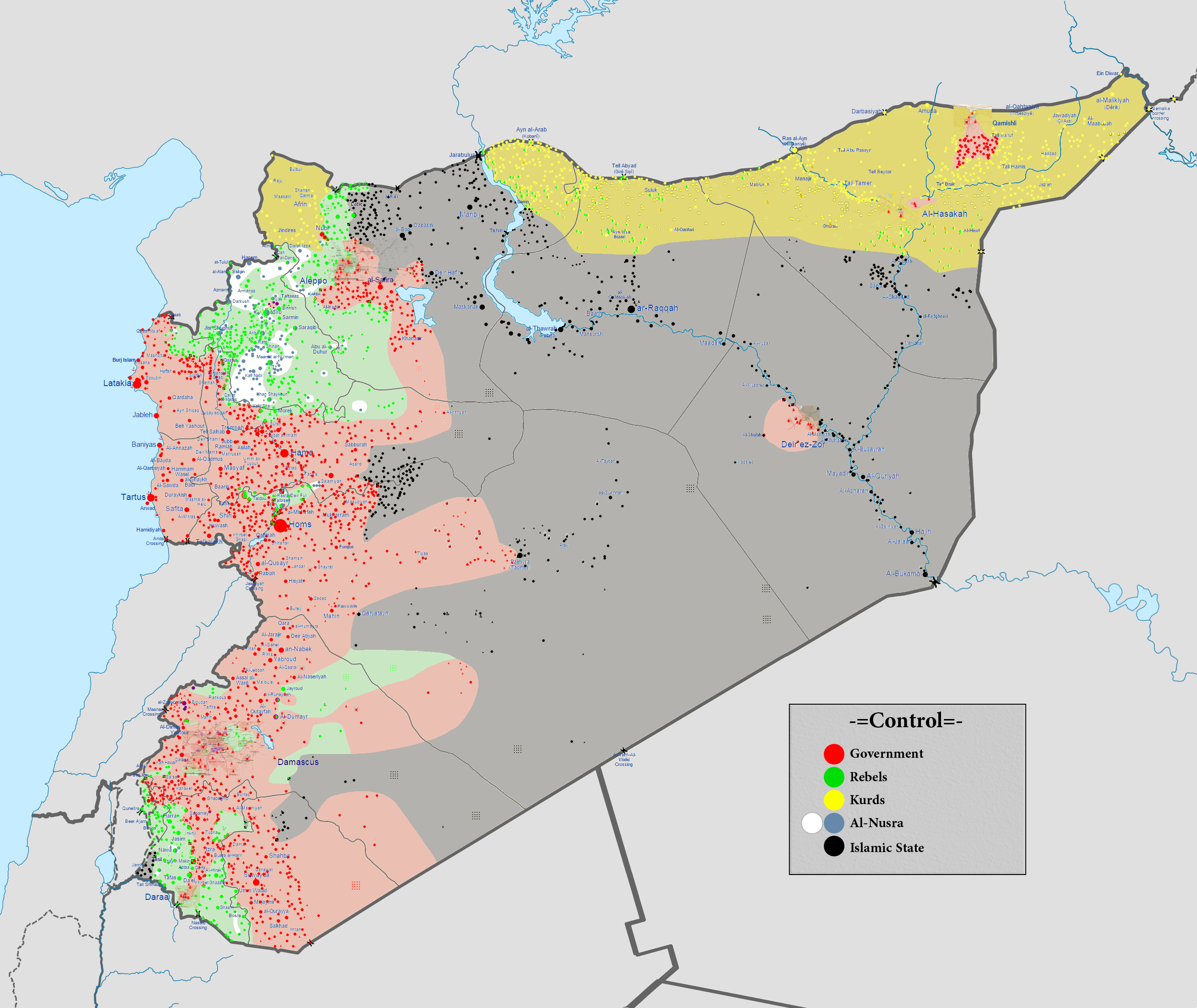
Military situation in the Syrian civil war in December 2015

As the conflict in Syria had intensified, U.S. president Obama in mid-August 2011 stated publicly that Syria's president Bashar al-Assad should step down. The U.S. pushed strongly for the United Nations Security Council to pass a resolution condemning the Syrian government's measures to suppress the rebellion and adopting economic sanctions against Syria in late September and early October 2011, and when Russia and the People's Republic of China wielded their veto power to block the proposal, Ambassador Susan Rice expressed "outrage".

Relations were further strained by Syrian security forces' failure to protect Robert Stephen Ford, the U.S. ambassador to Syria, from being attacked by pro-Assad crowds on at least two occasions, as well as to prevent vandalism of the U.S. embassy and diplomatic property. On October 24, 2011, the U.S. announced that it had recalled Ambassador Ford due to "credible threats against his personal safety."

After the revelation of the Houla massacre in May 2012, the U.S. State Department announced that the Syrian chargé d'affaires in Washington had been given 72 hours to leave the country.

Effective February 6, 2012, the U.S. Embassy suspended operations and closed for normal consular services. Currently, US interests in Syria are represented by an Interests Section in the Embassy of the Czech Republic.

In December 2012, US president Barack Obama announced the US would formally recognise the Syrian Opposition Coalition, rather than the Assad government, as the legitimate representative of the Syrian people. As of 2012, the embassy of the United States is suspended due to the Syrian civil war. The Syrian National Revolutionary Coalition’s offices have been recognized by the United States as its official diplomatic missions to Syria since May 2014.

On September 4, 2013, the Syrian Parliament addressed a letter to the U.S. House of Representatives. This letter argued against a U.S. bombing campaign against Syria, appealing to the two governments' common fight against Islamic extremism and blaming recent chemical weapons attacks on insurgents.

==== Economic sanctions under Obama ====
In May 2010, President Barack Obama renewed Bush's sanctions against Syria. As of 2010, there have been 20 Syrian citizens who have been sanctioned. On August 18, 2011, Executive Order 13582 signed by President Obama froze all assets of the government of Syria, prohibited U.S. persons from engaging in any transaction involving the government of Syria, banned U.S. imports of Syrian-origin petroleum or petroleum products, prohibited U.S. persons from having any dealings in or related to Syria's petroleum or petroleum products, and prohibited U.S. persons from operating or investing in Syria. This is considered the start of the comprehensive U.S. embargo on Syria.

===== Arming Syrian rebels =====
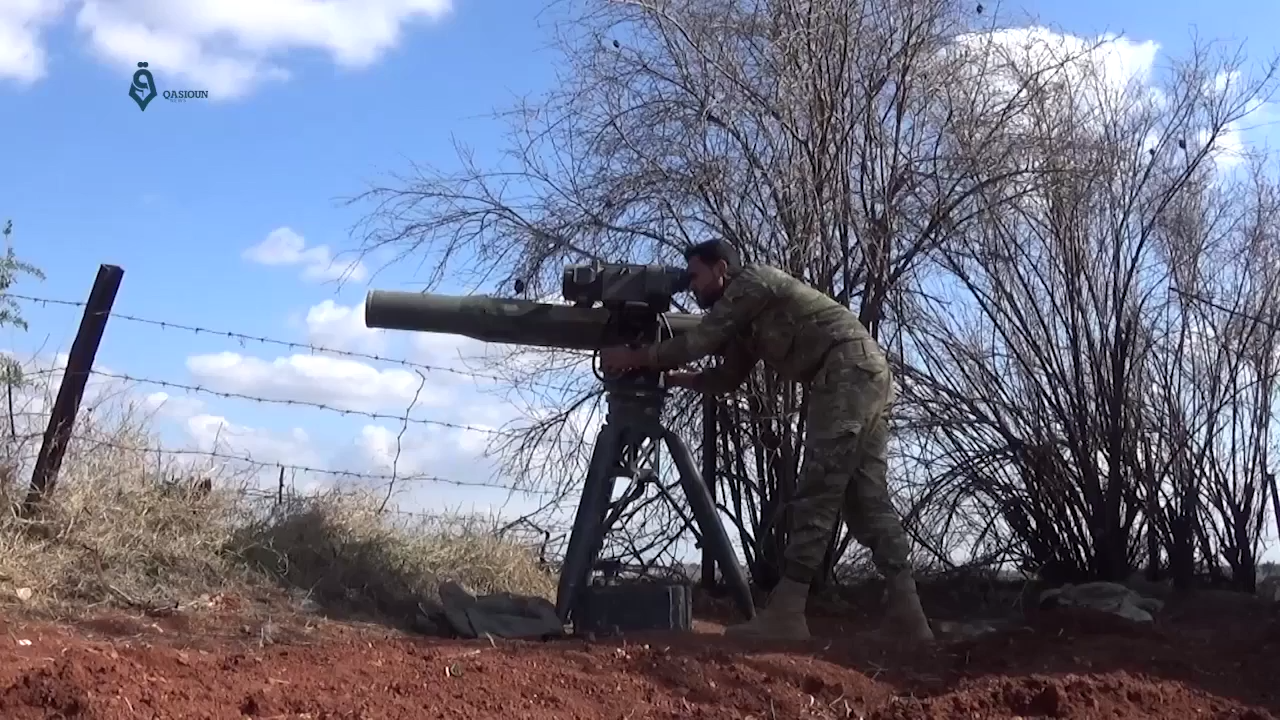
An Army of Glory fighter launches a BGM-71 TOW anti-tank missile at a Syrian government position during the 2017 Hama offensive.

Between 2013 and 2017, under the aegis of the covert CIA-directed operation Timber Sycamore and the overt Department of Defence-led Syrian Train and Equip Program, the US trained and armed nearly 10,000 rebel fighters at a cost of $1 billion a year. The CIA had been sending weapons to anti-government rebels in Syria since at least 2012. Some of these weapons reportedly fell into hands of extremists, such as al-Nusra Front and ISIL. Former CIA analyst and Brookings Institution fellow Bruce Riedel has stated that Saudi support for the program has given Saudi Arabia greater say over American policy in the Syrian civil war.

=== First Trump administration (2017–2021) ===
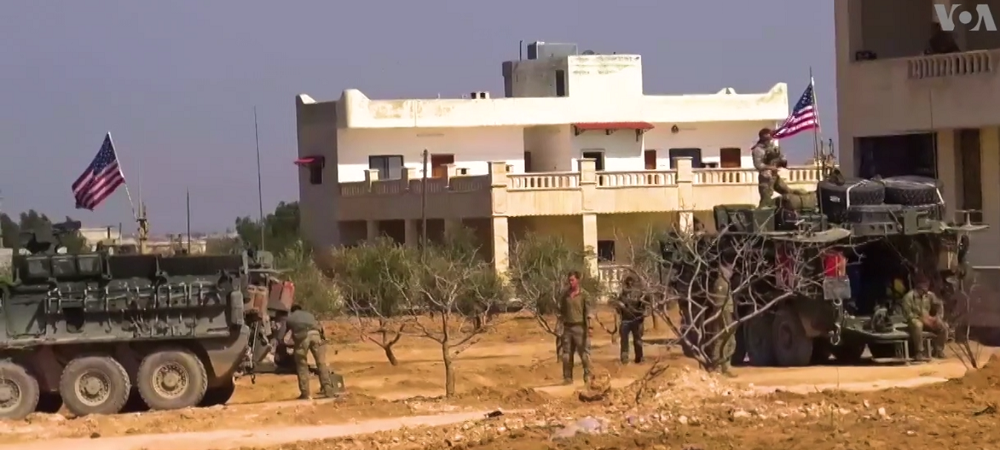
U.S. special operations forces near Manbij, acting as advisors to the Syrian Democratic Forces, March 2017

==== Trump's safe zone proposals ====
During and after his campaign, Trump proposed establishing safe zones in Syria as an alternative to Syrian refugees' immigration to the US. In the past "safe zones" have been interpreted as establishing, among other things, no-fly zones over Syria. During the Obama administration Turkey encouraged the US to establish safe zones; the Obama administration was concerned about the potential for pulling the US into a war with Russia. Although safe zones were not in the final version of Trump's controversial Executive Order 13769, an earlier draft leaked several days before would have required the US to create a plan for safe zones in Syria.

On January 30, 2017, the Saudi government informed Trump that it supported the creation of safe zones in Syria and Yemen. Two days later, on February 2, 2017, Trump discussed safe zones with the government of Jordan. On February 3 the U.S. secured Lebanon's backing for safe zones in Syria. On February 1, 2017, Russia asked the U.S. to be more specific on its safe-zone plan and expressed hope the U.S. would discuss it with Russia before implementation. On February 3, 2017, the United Nations High Commissioner on Refugees opposed safe zones. On February 10, 2017, Syrian president Bashar al-Assad, while welcoming a notion that U.S. troops might fight alongside Syria, rejected the proposal for safe zones as "not a realistic idea at all".

It was reported in July 2017 that President Donald Trump had ordered a "phasing out" of the CIA's support for anti-government rebels. It was reportedly done in order to improve relations with Russia. It was said it would be done not without a return. In December 2017, Max Abrams and John Glaser asserted in the Los Angeles Times that "[ISIL] imploded right after external support for the 'moderate' rebels dried up."

On December 19, 2018, President Trump announced that he ordered the pullout of all 2,000–2,500 U.S. troops operating in Syria, though no clear timetable was given. U.S. operations in al-Tanf continued into 2019.

==== Policy on Bashar al-Assad ====
On March 29, 2017, during the presidency of Donald Trump the United States secretary of state Rex Tillerson expressed that the longer-term status of President Bashar al-Assad is to be "decided by the Syrian people". This appears as a policy shift, since under President Barack Obama’s administration, the US made the departure of Assad a key policy aim. On March 30, 2017, United States Ambassador to the United Nations Nikki Haley reaffirmed that the priority of the United States policy concerning Bashar al-Assad is to no longer force him out of power.

On April 7, 2017, US missiles destroyed Shayrat Air Base in Homs Governorate which the US military claimed to be the base for the aircraft that carried out the Khan Shaykhun chemical attack three days earlier.

In April 2018, the US, alongside France and the UK, carried out missile strikes against Assad's compounds in response to the Douma chemical attack.

On June 17, 2020, reports claimed that the US imposed tough new economic sanctions under the Caesar Act, targeting anyone doing business with the Syrian president Bashar al-Assad from anywhere in the world. The sanctions were imposed to compel the Syrian government to halt its human rights abuses on civilians and accept a peaceful political transition. For the first time, the US has targeted Bashar al-Assad's wife, Asma al-Assad, claiming that she is "one of Syria's most notorious war profiteers".

On November 9, 2020, more sanctions were imposed on entities and individuals including parliament members who were supporting the al-Assad regime during the civil war.

=== Biden administration (2021–2025) ===
In March 2023, the US launched an airstrike against Syria in reaction to an Iraqi-made drone killing of a US contractor. The drone attack also injured US soldiers and another contractor. President Joe Biden said that the US "will forcefully protect our people."

In September 2023, the US captured an ISIS official after conducting a helicopter raid in northern Syria.

As a result of the October 7 attacks and the resulting rise in regional tensions, there have been at least nine drone and rocket attacks on American personnel in Syria.

=== Post-Assad Syria (2024–present) ===
==== Late Biden Administration (December 2024–January 2025) ====
Following a series of rebel offensives that resulted in the fall of the Assad regime on December 8, 2024, and the establishment of a caretaker government the next day, the two countries began to work together on a number of important issues that included combating Islamic State remnants in the Syrian Desert and locating American citizens recently freed from Assadist prisons.

On December 20, 2024, the United States removed the $10 million bounty on Ahmed al-Sharaa after meetings were held in Damascus with senior diplomats and representatives from Hay'at Tahrir al-Sham in order to help with relations between the new Syrian government and the United States. The meetings between United States officials and Hay'at Tahrir al-Sham officials talked about the many missing U.S. citizens including the journalist Austin Tice. This meeting was the first meeting in over a decade in Syria between the United States and the Syrian government and the main goal, according to the United States Department of State, was to help shape the political landscape of Syria. Furthermore, the CIA World Factbook was updated to list Mohammad al-Bashir as prime minister of Syria.

Relations were strained by the lack of a harsh American response to the Israeli bombing campaign and incursions into Syria immediately after the establishment of the caretaker government. Despite this, numerous American officials were in direct contact with the new regime.

==== Second Trump administration (2025–present) ====
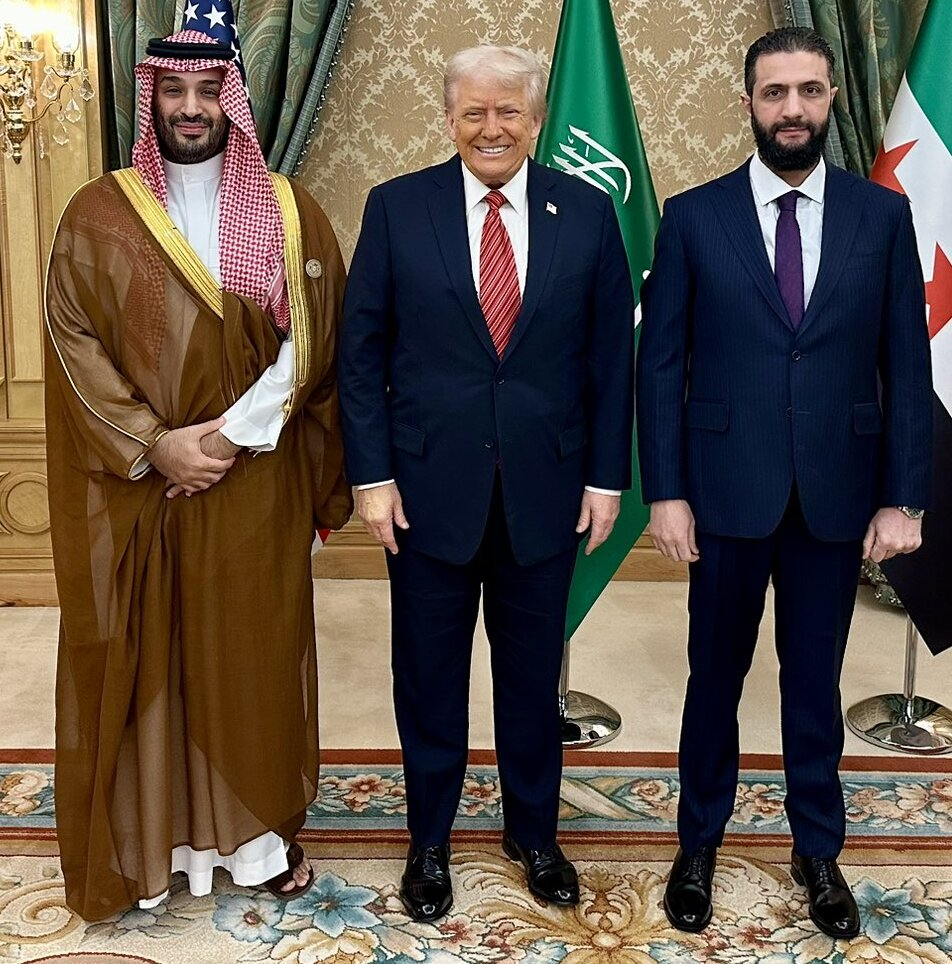
Al-Sharaa with U.S. president Donald Trump and Crown Prince of Saudi Arabia Mohammed bin Salman in Riyadh, Saudi Arabia, May 14, 2025

On January 21, 2025, Syria's then-de facto leader, Ahmed al-Sharaa, extended congratulations to U.S. president Donald Trump on his inauguration, expressing confidence in Trump's ability to "bring peace to the Middle East." al-Sharaa, who assumed leadership following the ousting of President Bashar al-Assad in December 2024, emphasized his administration's desire to improve relations between Syria and the United States through dialogue and understanding. He highlighted the immense suffering Syria has endured over the past decade due to conflict and expressed optimism that under Trump's leadership, stability could be restored to the region.

On March 25, 2025, the Trump administration handed Syria a list of conditions in exchange for partial sanctions relief and its support for Syria's territorial integrity, which included Syria committing to destroying its remaining chemical weapons, cooperating on counter-terrorism, barring foreign fighters from senior government roles, assisting U.S. efforts to find Austin Tice, and designating the Islamic Revolutionary Guard Corps of Iran as a terrorist organization.

===== Syrian transitional government =====
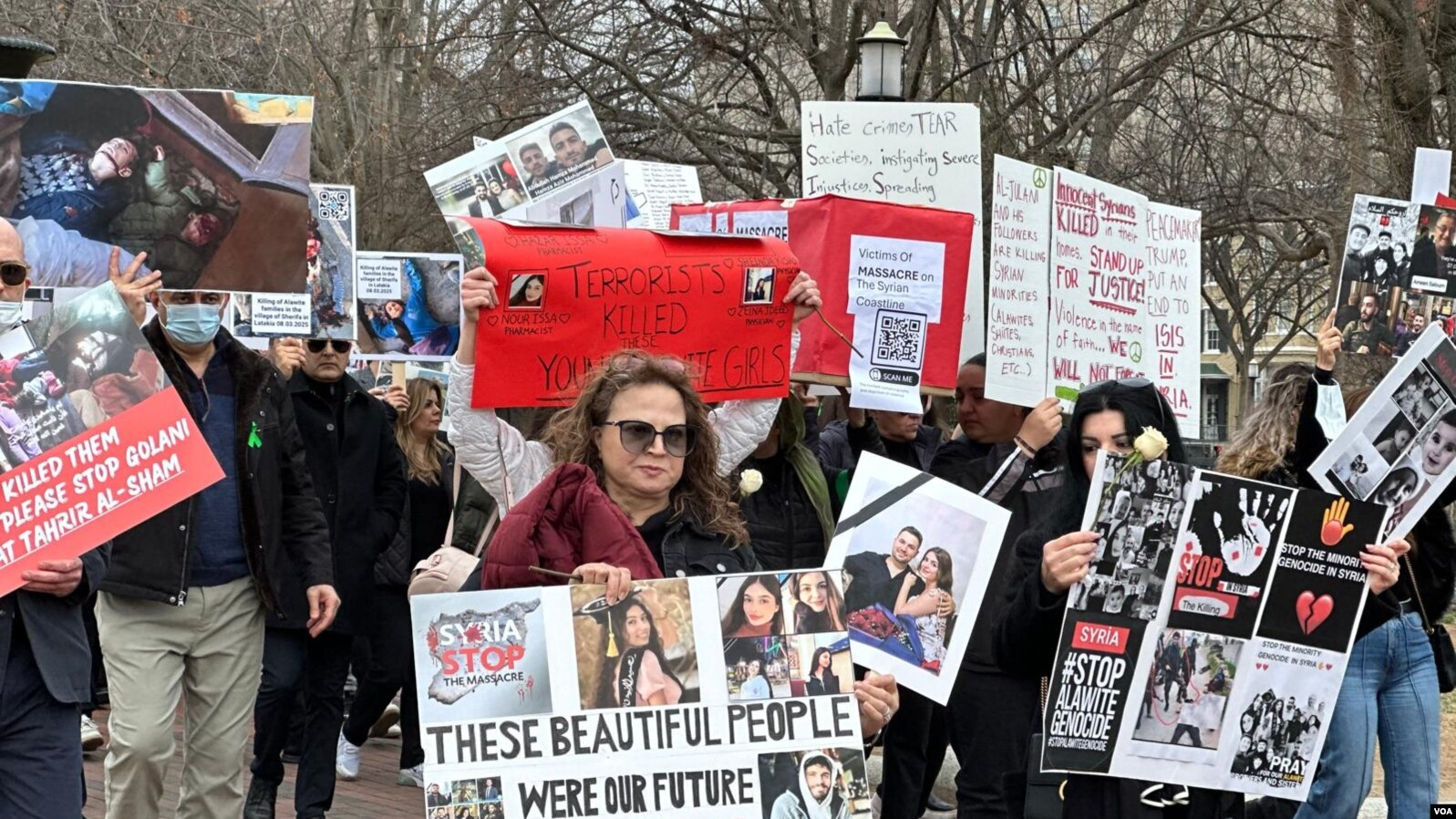
Protest in Washington D.C. against the 2025 massacres of Syrian Alawites

On May 13, 2025, during his trip to Saudi Arabia, Trump announced that he was lifting all sanctions on Syria, stating that "they have endured enough disasters, wars, and killing" and that his administration was willing to normalize relations with Syria's new government. According to Turkish foreign minister Hakan Fidan, the foreign ministers of Turkey, the United States, and Syria will convene to discuss the specifics of U.S. president Donald Trump's commitment to lifting sanctions against Syria.

On May 14, 2025, al-Sharaa met with Trump in Saudi Arabia, marking the first meeting between American and Syrian heads of state since Bill Clinton and Hafez al-Assad convened in Geneva in 2000.

On May 23, 2025, Trump appointed sitting U.S. Ambassador to Turkey Tom Barrack to also be the new US Special Envoy to Syria. On May 29, Barrack arrived at the American embassy in Damascus, which has been closed since 2012, as the American flag was raised there for the first time since closing. On June 18, 2025, it was reported that the US troops pulled out of two more bases in Northeastern Syria.

On June 30, President Trump signed an executive order lifting most U.S. economic sanctions on Syria in hopes that it will help Syria recover from years of war and attract foreign investment; while sanctions on Assad and his allies will remain, restrictions on Syrian banks and other institutions are being lifted.

===== 2025 September visit to the US =====
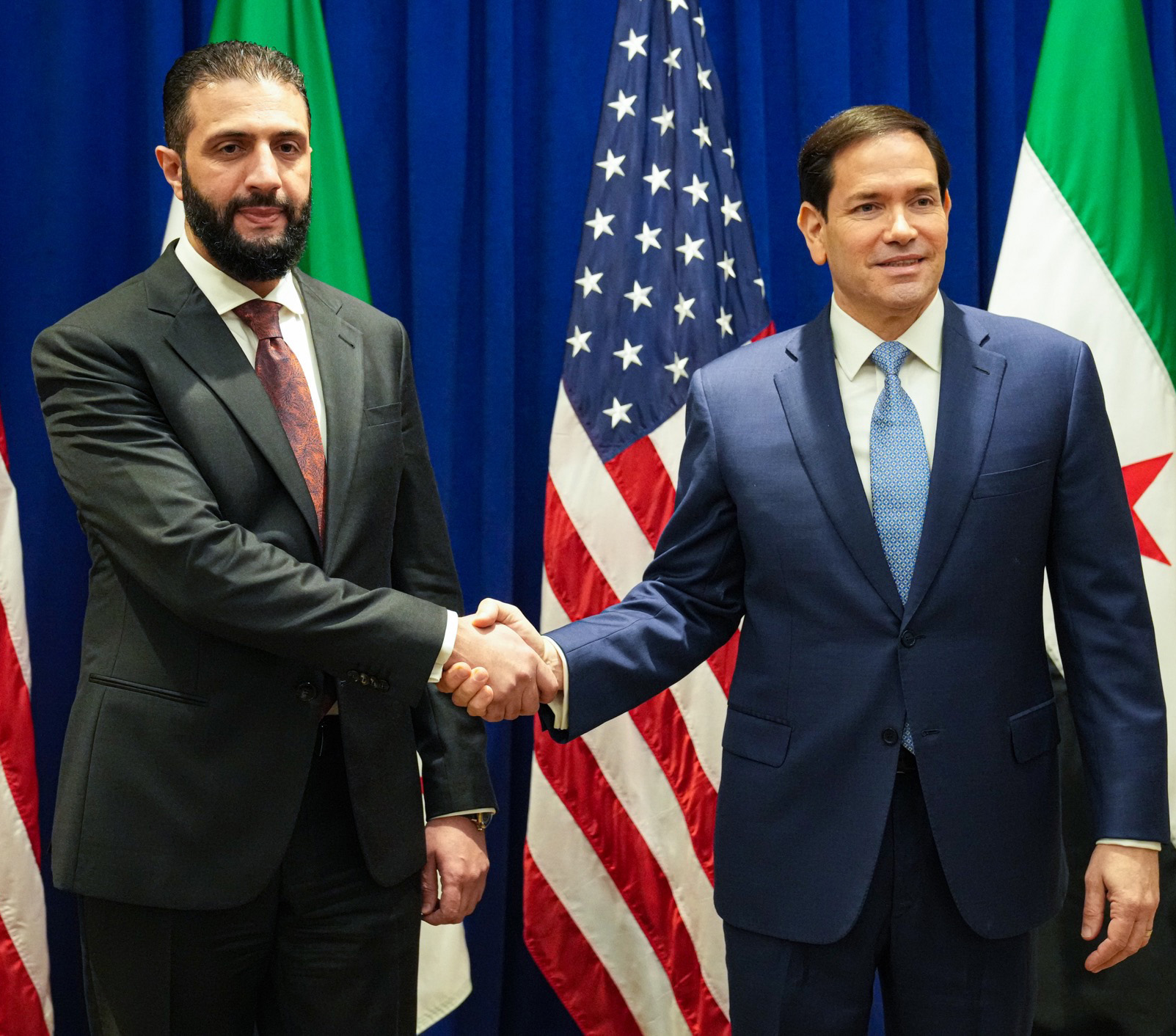
U.S. Secretary of State Marco Rubio with Syrian president Ahmed al-Sharaa in New York City on September 23, 2025

On September 22, 2025, Ahmed al-Sharaa made an important visit to the United States, going to New York to join the 80th meeting of the UN General Assembly. This is the first time since 1967 that a Syrian president has taken part in the UNGA, and the first official visit to the U.S. in almost 60 years. He traveled with four ministers, and it is regarded by many as an historic trip, showing Syria’s attempt to rebuild ties with Washington and move away from years of sanctions and isolation.

===== 2025 November visit to the US =====
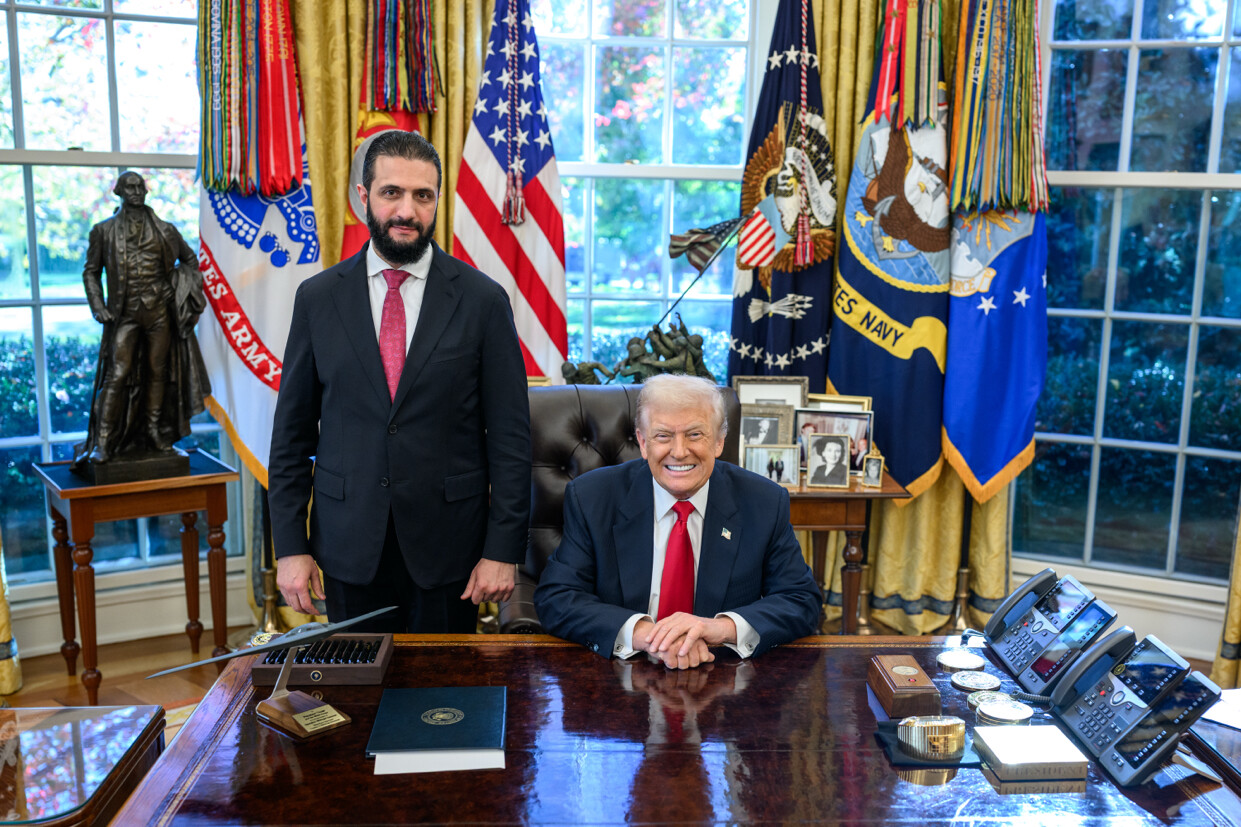
Trump with Syrian President Ahmed al-Sharaa in the Oval Office on November 10, 2025. The visit marked the first time a Syrian president had visited the White House since Syria gained independence in 1946.

On November 10, 2025, Syrian President Ahmed al-Sharaa visited the White House and held a closed-door meeting with US President Donald Trump, marking the first time any Syrian leader had visited Washington, D.C. Speaking to reporters, Trump praised Sharaa as a "strong leader" and voiced confidence in him. "We’ll do everything we can to make Syria successful," he said.

Promising "continued sanctions relief," the Treasury Department announced a new order to replace its May 23 waiver on enforcement of the 2019 Caesar Act, which imposed sweeping sanctions over human rights abuses under Assad.

===== 2026 NATO summit meeting with Donald Trump =====
On July 8, 2026, Ahmed al-Sharaa met U.S. President Donald Trump on the sidelines of the 2026 NATO summit in Ankara to discuss Syrian–American relations and regional issues. Trump praised al-Sharaa as a "fantastic" and "highly respected" leader and said he expected to remove Syria from the U.S. list of state sponsors of terrorism, potentially opening the way for greater economic engagement.

== See also ==
- Attacks on U.S. bases in Iraq, Jordan, and Syria during the Israel–Hamas war
- US intervention in the Syrian civil war
- Foreign involvement in the Syrian civil war § United States
- Syrian Americans
- CIA activities in Syria
