= Brett McGurk =

American diplomat (born 1973)

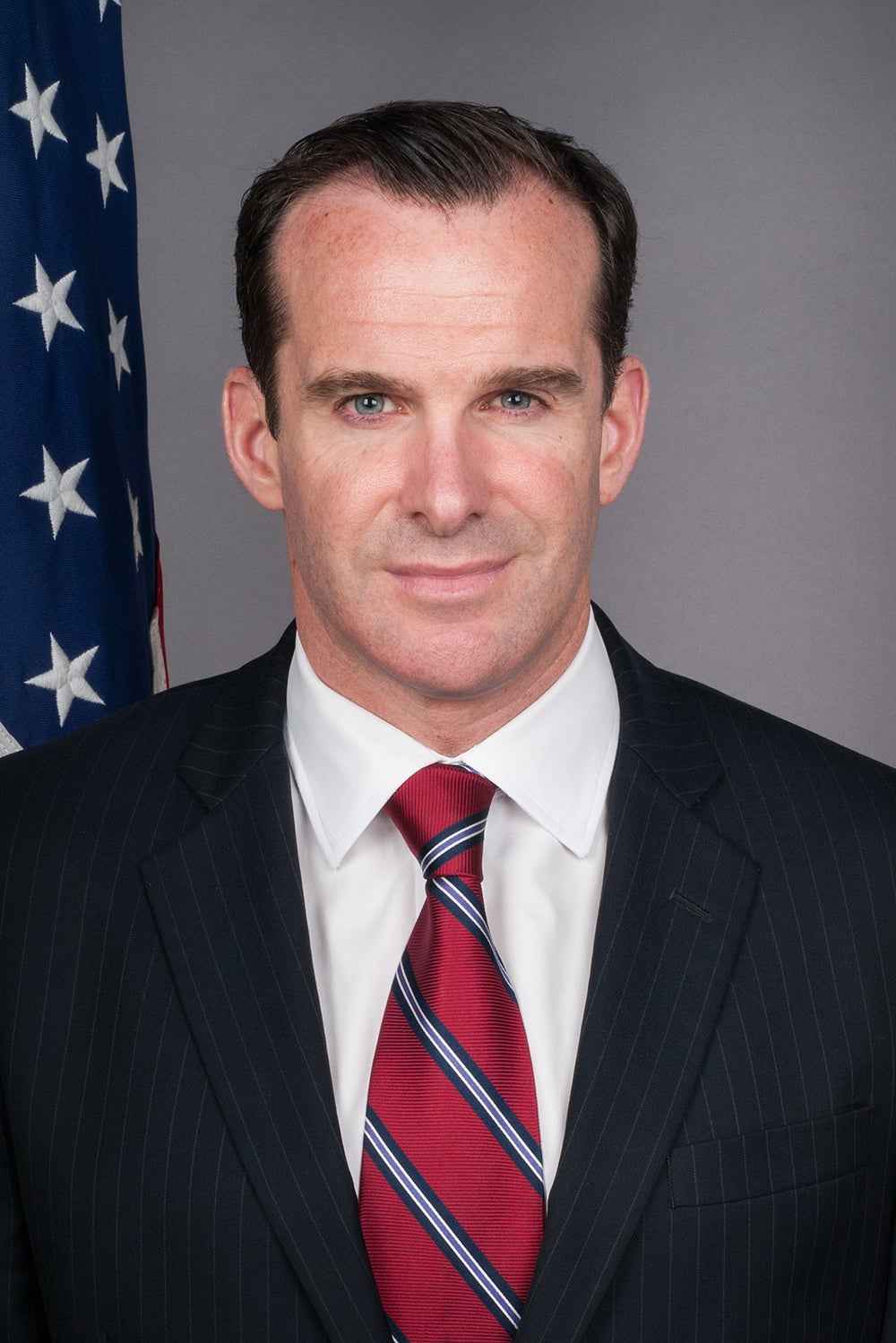

National Security Council Coordinator for the Middle East and North Africa
- In office January 20, 2021 – January 20, 2025
- President: Joe Biden
- Preceded by: Position established

Special Presidential Envoy for the Global Coalition to Counter the Islamic State of Iraq and the Levant
- In office October 23, 2015 – December 31, 2018
- President: Barack Obama; Donald Trump
- Preceded by: John R. Allen
- Succeeded by: James Franklin Jeffrey

Personal details
- Born: April 20, 1973 (age 53) Pittsburgh, Pennsylvania, U.S.
- Spouse(s): Caroline Wong Gina Chon (m. 2012)
- Education: University of Connecticut (BA); Columbia University (JD)

Brett Holden McGurk (born April 20, 1973) is an American diplomat, attorney, and academic who served in senior national security positions under presidents George W. Bush, Barack Obama, Donald Trump, and Joe Biden. He served as deputy assistant to President Biden and National Security Council coordinator for the Middle East and North Africa. He most recently led negotiations between the United States, Israel, Egypt, and Qatar to establish a ceasefire in Gaza and the release of Israeli hostages held by Hamas.

He was the special presidential envoy for the global coalition to counter ISIL. He was appointed to this post by President Obama in October 2015 and was retained in that role by the Trump administration until 2018. McGurk had been slated to leave the post in mid-February 2019, but announced his resignation in December of the prior year following President Trump's decision to withdraw troops from Syria.

McGurk also served as deputy assistant secretary of state for Iraq and Iran and from October 2014 until January 2016, led secret negotiations with Iran that led to a prisoner swap and release of four Americans. He earlier served under President George W. Bush as special assistant to the president and senior director for Iraq and Afghanistan, and under Barack Obama as a senior advisor to the National Security Council and U.S. ambassador to Iraq.

== Early life and education ==
McGurk was born to Barry McGurk, an English professor, and Carol Ann Capobianco, an art teacher, in Pittsburgh, Pennsylvania, on April 20, 1973. His family later moved to West Hartford, Connecticut, where he graduated from Conard High School in 1991. McGurk completed a BA at the University of Connecticut Honors Program in 1996, and a JD at Columbia Law School in 1999. While at Columbia, he was a senior editor of the Columbia Law Review and a Harlan Fiske Stone Scholar. He is a member of the Theta chapter of Zeta Psi fraternity.

After graduation, McGurk completed clerkships in the federal judiciary for Judge Gerard E. Lynch on the U.S. District Court for the Southern District of New York, Judge Dennis Jacobs on the U.S. Court of Appeals for the Second Circuit (Manhattan), and for Chief Justice William Rehnquist on the U.S. Supreme Court. Following his clerkships, McGurk worked briefly as appellate litigation associate at Kirkland & Ellis, as well as an adjunct professor at the University of Virginia School of Law.

== Career ==
=== War ===
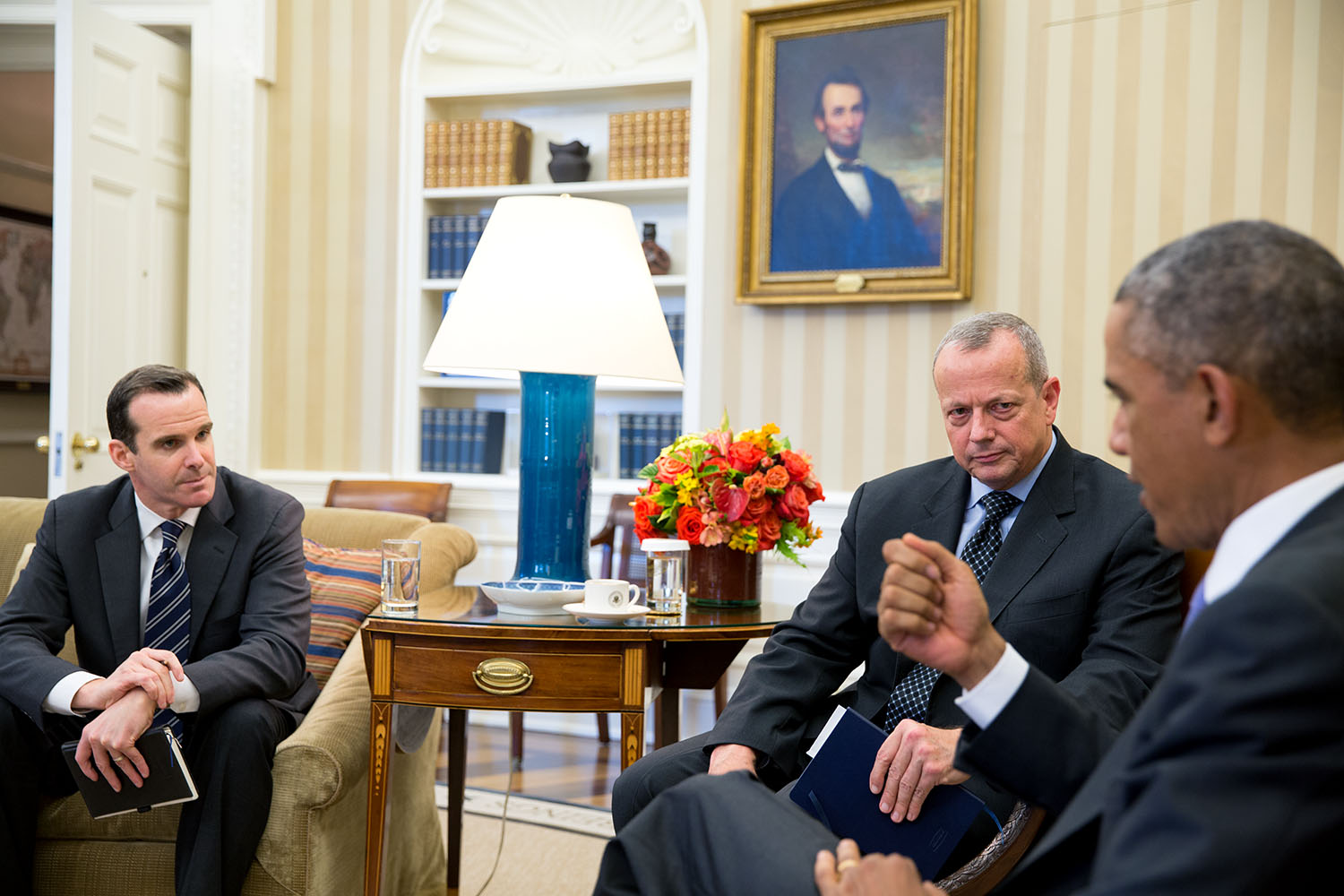
President Barack Obama meets with retired Gen. John Allen, special presidential envoy for the Global Coalition to Counter ISIL, and Brett McGurk, Deputy special presidential envoy, left, in the Oval Office, Sep 16, 2014

In January 2004, McGurk returned to public service as a legal advisor to both the Coalition Provisional Authority (CPA) and the United States ambassador in Baghdad. During his tenure in Baghdad, McGurk helped draft Iraq's interim constitution, the Transitional Administrative Law, and oversaw the legal transition from the CPA to an Interim Iraqi Government led by Prime Minister Ayad Allawi. In 2005, he was transferred to the National Security Council, where he served as director for Iraq, and later as special assistant to the president and senior director for Iraq and Afghanistan. In 2006, McGurk became an early advocate for a fundamental change in Iraq policy and helped develop what is now known as "the surge," which began in January 2007. President Bush later asked McGurk to lead negotiations with Ambassador Ryan Crocker to establish a strategic framework agreement and security agreement with the government of Iraq, thereby ensuring continuity in policy beyond the end of his administration. In 2009, McGurk was retained during the transition from George W. Bush to Barack Obama, serving as a senior advisor to both the president and the United States ambassador to Iraq.

McGurk left government service in the fall of 2009 and served as a resident fellow at the Harvard Institute of Politics. He also served as an international affairs fellow at the Council on Foreign Relations. He has also been a frequent commentator on several news outlets. He was called back into public service in the summer of 2010 after a deadlock over formation of a new Iraqi government, and later in the summer of 2011, following a deadlock in negotiations with the government of Iraq to extend the security agreement that had been concluded in 2008.

In August 2013, he was appointed deputy assistant secretary of state for Iraq and Iran in the Bureau of Near Eastern Affairs at the State Department.

In November 2013, and again in February 2014, McGurk testified before the House Armed Services Committee about the emerging threat of the Islamic State of Iraq and the Levant (ISIL).

On June 9, 2014, McGurk was in Erbil, in the Kurdistan region of Iraq, when ISIL overran Mosul's city and approached Baghdad. He later flew to Baghdad and helped oversee the evacuation of 1,500 U.S. employees from the U.S. embassy, while working with President Obama and the National Security Council to develop the U.S. diplomatic and military response to the ISIL threat. McGurk would ultimately play a leading role in facilitating the establishment of a new government in Iraq, led by Prime Minister Haider al-Abadi, and removing Prime Minister Nouri al-Maliki, who had served as prime minister for eight years.

On September 12, 2014, Secretary of State John Kerry announced McGurk's appointment as deputy senior envoy with the rank of ambassador to General John Allen, who that day was named to the newly created position of special presidential envoy for the global coalition to counter ISIL. On October 23, 2015, Secretary Kerry announced McGurk's appointment as ambassador and deputy special presidential envoy for the global coalition to counter ISIL. Three days later, McGurk met in the Oval Office with Obama and Allen to discuss the strategy for building a global alliance to defeat ISIL. On December 3, 2014, in Brussels, Belgium, a formal alliance of 62 nations was formed to support Iraq and help the new government under Prime Minister Abadi fight ISIL along five military and diplomatic lines of effort.

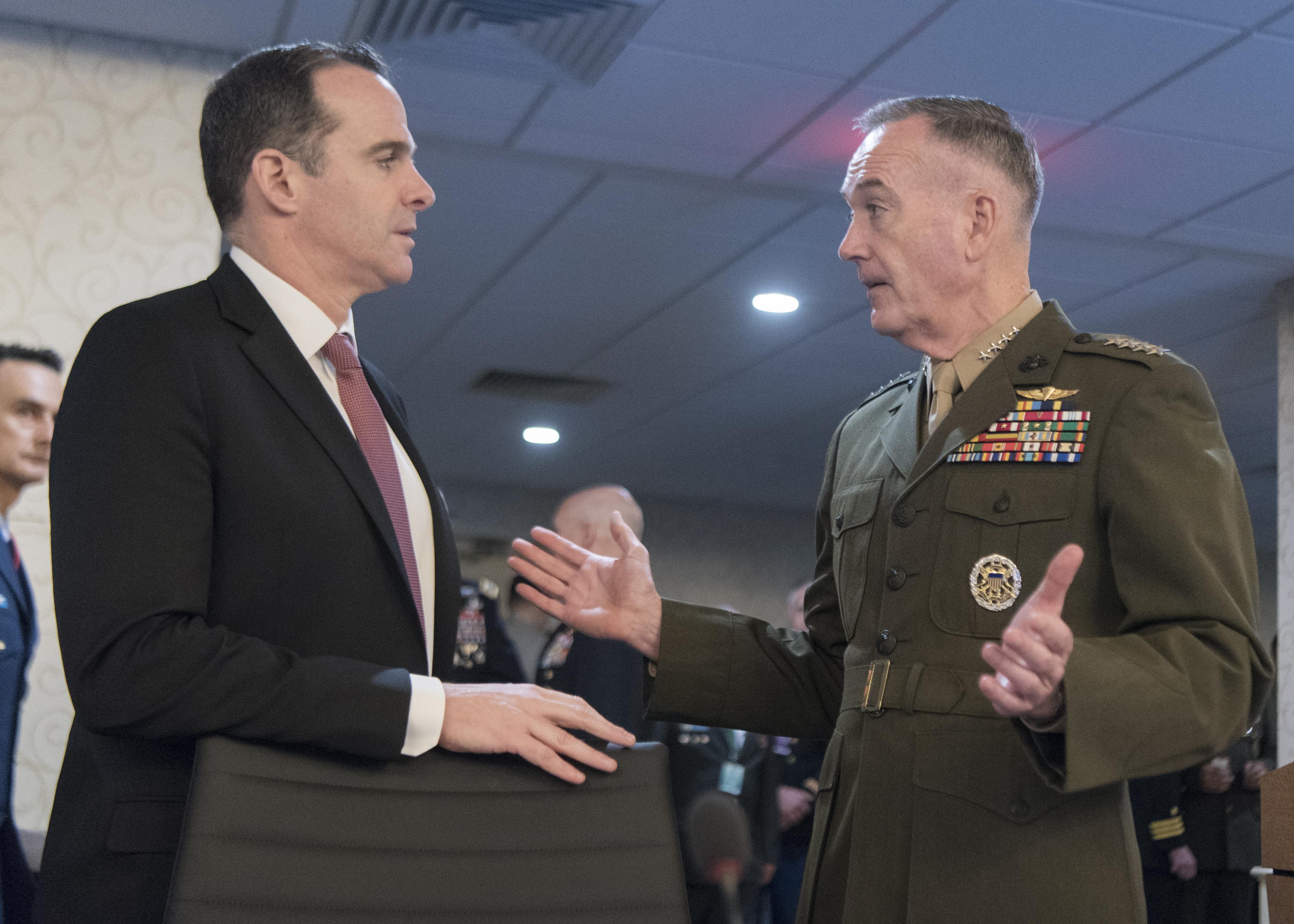
Marine Corps Gen. Joseph F. Dunford, Jr., chairman of the Joint Chiefs of Staff, speaks to special envoy for the Global Coalition to Counter the Islamic State of Iraq and the Levant, Brett H. McGurk, during the 2017 Chiefs of Defense Conference at Fort Belvoir, Va., Oct 24, 2017

In his role as special presidential envoy, McGurk worked to organize a global coalition of nations as well as coalitions on the ground in Iraq and Syria to help eject ISIL from its strongholds. He was intimately involved, for example, in negotiating agreements between Arabs and Kurds to prepare for the liberation of Mosul. He also helped lead negotiations with Turkey to open Incirlik airbase for counter-ISIL missions, and prepare the historic defense of Kobani in Syria by negotiating with Turkey to permit the Kurdish Peshmerga to enter the besieged city through Turkish territory. McGurk has since visited the battlefields of Kobani where he met officials from the Kurdish Democratic Union Party (PYD) and its People's Protection Units (YPG), as well as the front lines in Mosul to meet with Iraqi soldiers and Kurdish Pershmerga prior to an offensive to secure the eastern side of the city.

He also helped rally the global coalition for military and financial contributions to support major counter-ISIL operations in Iraq and Syria, with emphasis on post-conflict stabilization and returning the displaced to their homes. In August 2017, McGurk stated that the Trump administration had "dramatically accelerated" the U.S.–led campaign against ISIL, citing estimates that almost one-third of the territory taken from ISIL "has been won in the last six months." McGurk favorably cited "steps President Trump has taken, including delegating decision–making authority from the White House to commanders in the field."

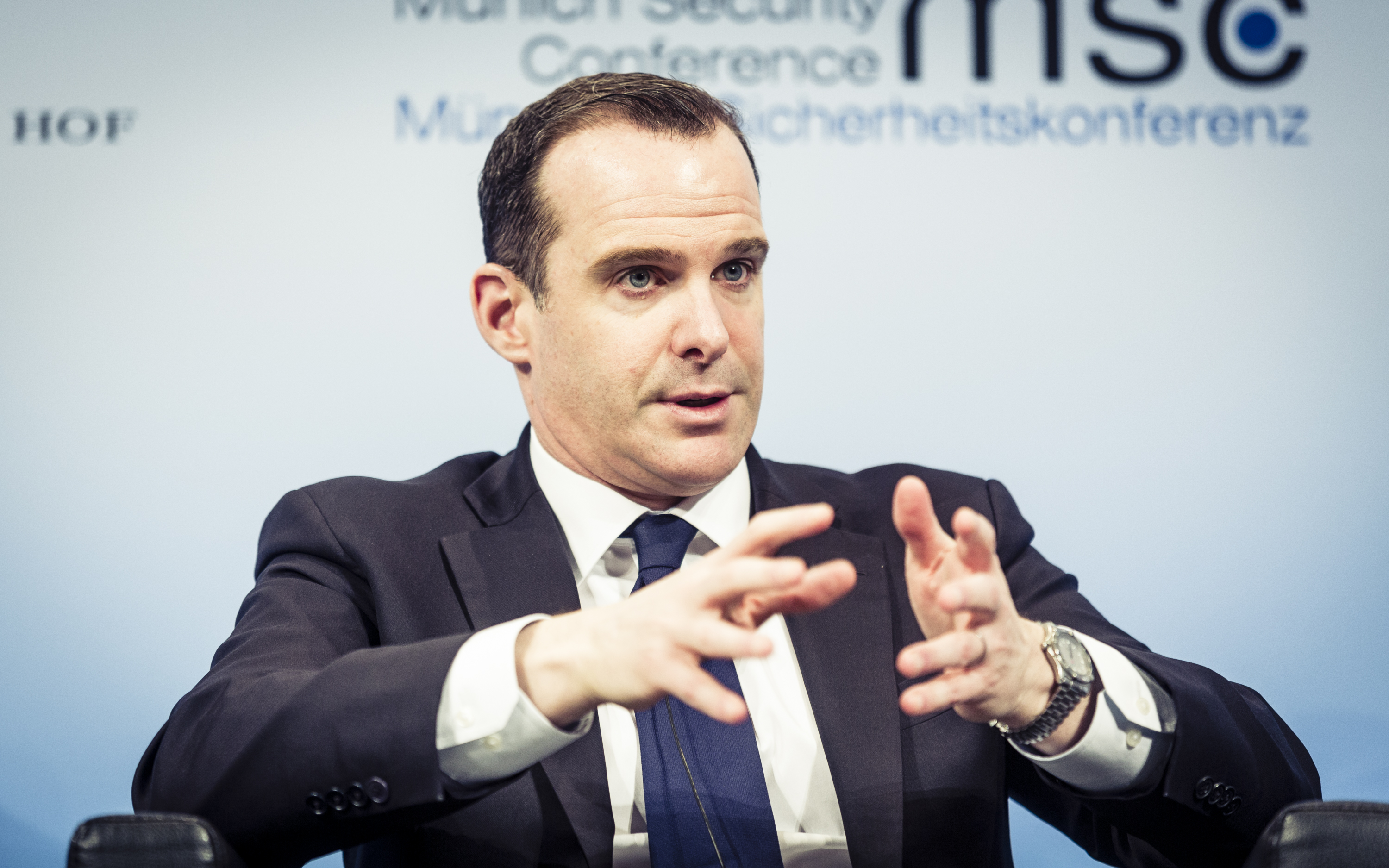
McGurk during the MSC 2017

During the Trump administration, he worked with James Mattis and Rex Tillerson, then-secretaries of defense and state, respectively, to develop the accelerated campaign against ISIL, which led to the liberation of Raqqa in October 2017. He also visited the battlefields of Syria multiple times to help organize the coalition of Arab and Kurdish fighters that has succeeded in defeating ISIL in its former strongholds. He later led talks with Russia and Jordan to establish a ceasefire zone in southwest Syria and spearheaded an initiative with Tillerson to restore ties between Saudi Arabia and Iraq after nearly three decades of dormant relations.

McGurk spent much of the summer and fall of 2018 shuttling between Iraq and Syria with a focus on finalizing plans to defeat ISIL in its last strongholds of eastern Syria and establishing an Iraqi government that would continue to welcome an American and Coalition military presence. For the latter assignment, McGurk was the target of Iranian-backed protests and assassination threats by Iranian-backed militias. Secretary of State Mike Pompeo tweeted on September 1, 2018 that McGurk was "doing a great job" in Baghdad while undertaking this difficult and dangerous assignment. The new Iraqi government that formed on October 3, 2018, with McGurk's active facilitation, has been characterized as the most competent and Western-friendly since the 2003 U.S. invasion of Iraq.

=== Iran talks ===
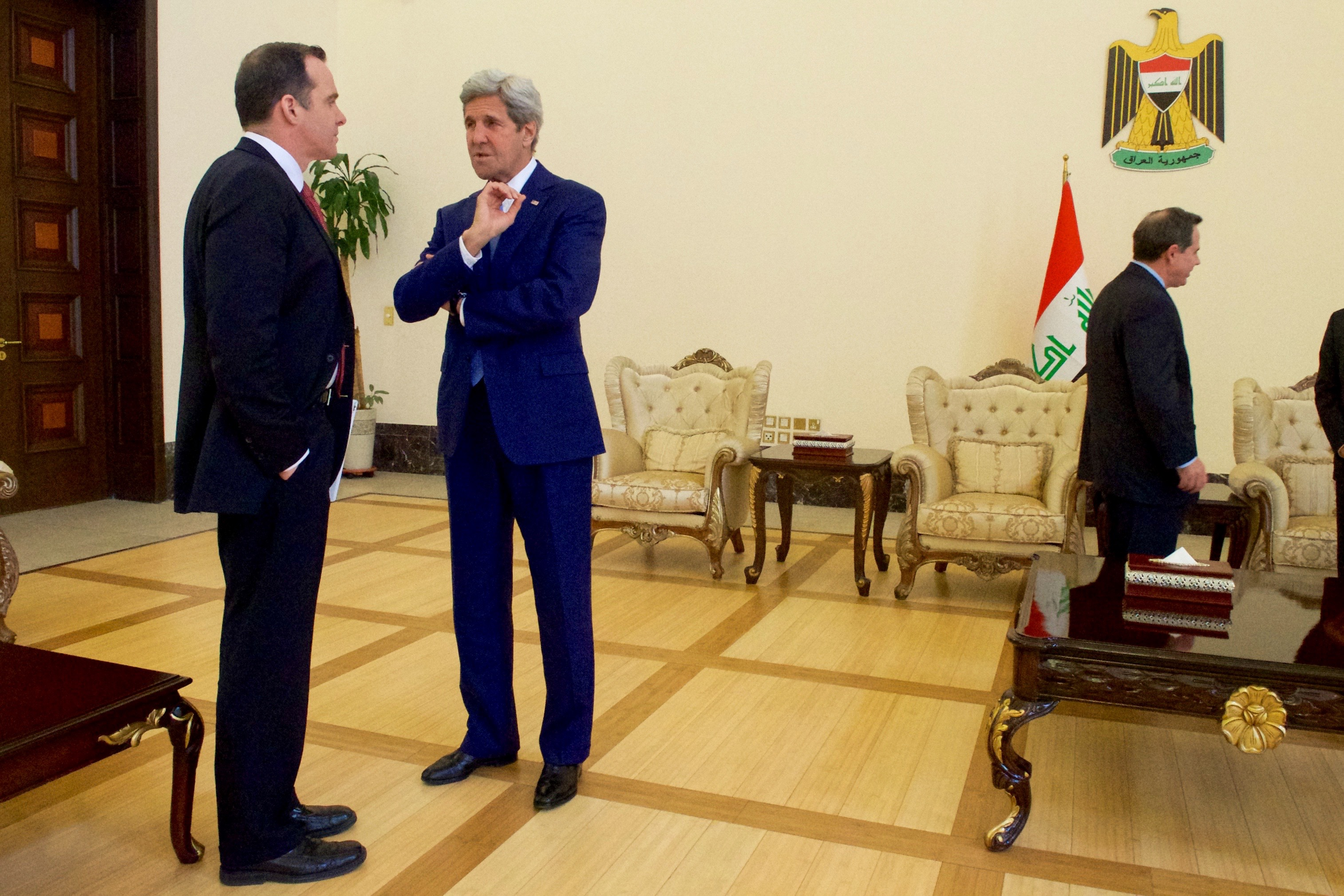
U.S. Secretary of State John Kerry speaks with special presidential envoy for the Global Coalition to Counter ISIL Brett McGurk on April 8, 2016

From October 2014 to January 2016, McGurk was lead negotiator in secret negotiations with Iran that led to an exchange of prisoners and the return of four Americans, including Jason Rezaian, Amir Hekmati, and Saeed Abedini.

=== Controversy over ambassadorial nomination ===
On March 26, 2012, McGurk was nominated to become the next United States ambassador to Iraq, succeeding James F. Jeffrey. However, McGurk's confirmation hearings soon became embroiled in controversy after a series of his emails were leaked to the press and published on Cryptome. Speculation remains as to who was responsible for the leak. The illicit emails were exchanged with Gina Chon, then a reporter for The Wall Street Journal. Critics claim that the extramarital affair cast doubt on his ability to lead and manage the embassy, while supporters argue that it was at most a momentary lapse in judgment and that McGurk and Chon were a married couple when the series of emails from five years earlier leaked.

Chon was later accused of sharing articles with McGurk before publication, and was forced to resign from the newspaper. McGurk and Chon married in 2012.

On June 18, 2012, McGurk submitted a letter to Obama and withdrew himself from further consideration. "While we regret to see Brett withdraw his candidacy," Tommy Vietor, a White House spokesman, said in a statement later that day, "there is no doubt that he will be called on again to serve the country." The position eventually went to Robert S. Beecroft.

=== Resignation from anti-ISIL post ===
On January 19, 2017, President-Elect Donald Trump's press secretary Sean Spicer announced that the incoming administration would retain the Obama-appointed McGurk in his role leading the counter-ISIL campaign. McGurk indicated in a December 11, 2018, press briefing that the war against ISIL in Syria was not over, stating, "It would be reckless if we were just to say, well, the physical caliphate is defeated, so we can just leave now." On December 22, 2018, in the wake of Trump's decision to withdraw troops from Syria, McGurk announced his resignation effective December 31, 2018. McGurk had been slated to leave the post in mid-February 2019. In response, Trump wrote that he "did not know" McGurk and questioned if McGurk was a "grandstander". (Note: McGurk was succeeded by US Special Representative for Syria Engagement James Jeffrey on January 4, 2019.)

McGurk criticized Trump's Syria withdrawal order in a Washington Post opinion piece on January 18, saying Trump's decision was made "without deliberation, consultation with allies or Congress, assessment of risk, or appreciation of facts." He endorsed the view that America's adversaries will take advantage of the power vacuum created by a premature pullout from Syria, writing: "the Islamic State and other extremist groups will fill the void opened by our departure, regenerating their capacity to threaten our friends in Europe — as they did throughout 2016 — and ultimately our own homeland". McGurk also wrote an essay for the May/June 2019 edition of Foreign Affairs, in which he said the United States should not expect to reach the goals it had set with a smaller number of troops.

After Trump announced in October 2019 that he would withdraw American forces from Syria, McGurk wrote a Twitter thread that not only sharply criticized the decision, but also characterized Trump as generally reckless in foreign policy. McGurk wrote, "Donald Trump is not a Commander-in-Chief. He makes impulsive decisions with no knowledge or deliberation. He sends military personnel into harm's way with no backing. He blusters and then leaves our allies exposed when adversaries call his bluff or he confronts a hard phone call."

=== Academic and media career (2019–2020) ===
On January 2, 2019, Stanford University announced that McGurk had accepted a two-year appointment as the Frank E. and Arthur W. Payne Distinguished Lecturer at Stanford's Freeman Spogli Institute. In the announcement, former Secretary of State Condoleezza Rice stated: "Brett McGurk is the consummate professional diplomat. He has served on the front lines across three administrations, and handled some of the most difficult assignments for me and President Bush in Iraq during the surge." McGurk also holds a post at the Carnegie Endowment for International Peace in Washington, D.C., as a non-Resident Senior Fellow. Carnegie President and former Deputy Secretary of State William J. Burns announced McGurk's affiliation with Carnegie, stating: "For more than a decade, and across administrations of both parties, Brett has led some of the most difficult and important U.S. diplomatic endeavors in the Middle East with extraordinary skill and tireless commitment."

While at Stanford, McGurk has published commentary on Syria, China, Iran, and the insolvency of President Trump's foreign policy between stated objective and dedicated resources. He also published a well-received op-ed on the need to revitalize America's diplomatic corps including through an ROTC-like program to draw from America's colleges and universities to compete with great power competitors. The op-ed became a cornerstone of proposals by presidential candidate Elizabeth Warren and was reflected in Vice President Joe Biden's foreign policy speech.

In February 2019, McGurk received the James Foley Freedom Award for his work in securing the release of Americans held hostage by the Iranian government and his leadership in the campaign to defeat ISIL.

McGurk was a Senior Foreign Affairs Analyst with NBC News and MSNBC, commentating regularly on foreign policy matters across NBC platforms. He also regularly speaks to public audiences about national security strategy, war, diplomacy, and decision-making.

=== National Security Council (2021) ===
President-elect Joe Biden's January 2021 choice of McGurk for the National Security Council was described by analysts as sending a "strong signal" to Turkey. This conclusion was based on McGurk's past criticisms of Turkey's government, which included condemning their October 2019 military offensive into Syria against the SDF, accusing Turkey of purposefully not securing their border with Syria so foreigners could join ISIL, suggesting that Turkish President Recep Tayyip Erdogan may have harbored ISIL leader Abu Bakr al-Baghdadi, and denouncing Erdogan for hosting Hamas leader Ismail Haniyeh. In February 2022 the White House sent Brett McGurk to Riyadh after the transfer of missile interceptors to the kingdom to discuss the uncertain energy supply and the war in Yemen among other issues. McGurk later organized and oversaw President Biden's visit to Israel and to Saudi Arabia, which advanced the process of establishing normalized relations between the two countries, including with the announcement during the trip that Israeli civilian aircraft for the first time could overfly Saudi airspace for international destinations, as well as the removal of international observers from Saudi islands in the Red Sea, and new security arrangements in the area coordinated between Israel, Egypt, and Saudi Arabia.

==== Israel-Gaza War negotiations ====
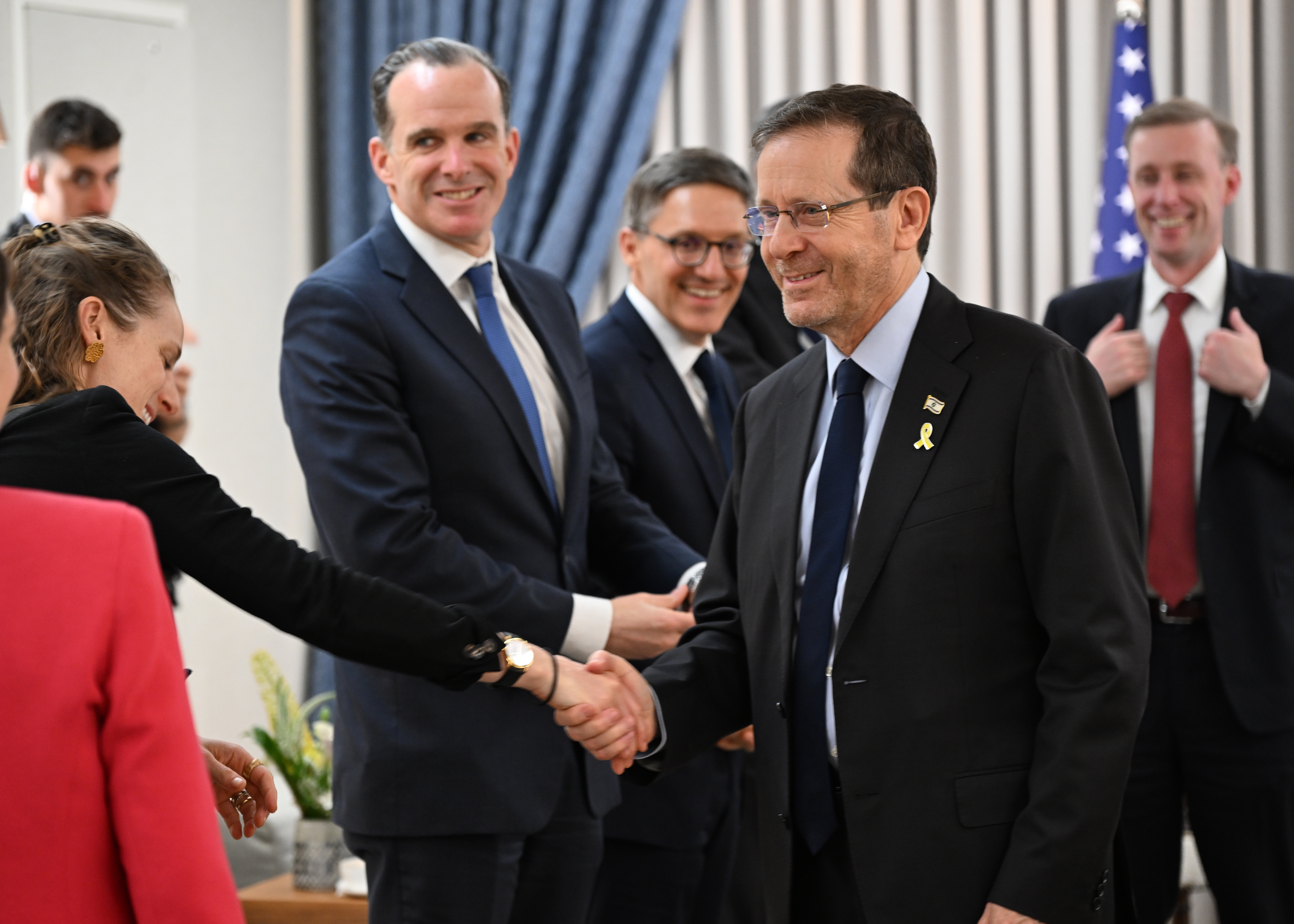
McGurk with Israeli President Isaac Herzog and Biden's National Security Adviser Jake Sullivan, May 19, 2024

In November 2023, McGurk was selected by President Biden to lead negotiations between Israel and Hamas in an effort to secure the release of hostages in Gaza. At the November 2023 “Manama Dialogue” hosted by International Institute for Strategic Studies in Bahrain, McGurk, responding to a statement by Ayman Safadi, Jordan's deputy Prime Minister, that humanitarian aid was needed in Gaza, predicted that a release of the hostages by Hamas would cause a significant pause in the Gaza war, accompanied by a massive surge of humanitarian relief. Noting that "Hamas from the earliest days has said if you want the hostages returned, we need fuel, more humanitarian supplies. That's the bargain they set,” he said:

A release of large numbers of hostages would result in a significant pause in fighting. A significant pause in fighting, and a massive surge of humanitarian relief. Hundreds and hundreds of trucks on a sustained basis entering Gaza from Egypt.

The European Union's top diplomat, Josep Borrell, High Representative of the Union for Foreign Affairs and Security Policy and Vice-President of the European Commission, replied: “It's quite understandable that without the freedom of the hostages, nothing can be solved.” Bahrain's Crown Prince Salman bin Hamad Al Khalifa opened the summit with a call for an exchange between Hamas and Israel for the hostages and a stop to the fighting. McGurk's linkage of a hostage release to relieving the Gazan humanitarian crisis was criticized by the president of Refugees International, as promoting collective punishment of the Palestinians for the actions of Hamas, which violates the laws of armed conflict. Safadi also criticized the linkage: "I just don't find it acceptable that Israel links humanitarian aid to the release of hostages. Israel is taking 2.3 million Palestinians hostage.”

In December 2024 McGurk invited president-elect Donald Trump's nominee to succeed him the following month, Steve Witkoff, to join him in negotiating what resulted in a ceasefire and hostage exchange between Israel and Hamas in January 2025; they teamed with Qatari prime minister Sheikh Mohammed bin Abdulrahman Al Thani, who it was agreed would be the one who would speak to Hamas. A six-week ceasefire agreement was agreed to, during which there would be a swap of 33 Hamas-held hostages taken in the October 7 attacks for approximately 1,000 Palestinian prisoners (most of whom were imprisoned without charge), a halt to fighting accompanied by a surge of humanitarian relief into Gaza, and steps would be taken toward further exchanges and toward ending the 15-month war. The New York Times wrote: "It was a vivid example of cooperation between two men representing bitter political rivals. Rarely if ever have teams of current and new presidents of different parties worked together at such a high-stakes moment, with the fate of American lives and the future of a devastating war hanging in the balance."

== Awards ==
McGurk was awarded the Distinguished Honor Award by Secretary of State Condoleezza Rice in January 2009 and the Distinguished Service Award by Secretary of State John Kerry in November 2016. These were the highest awards each Secretary could bestow in McGurk's capacity as a White House official under the Bush administration and a State Department official under the Obama administration. He has also received the Superior Honor Award from the U.S. Department of State, and the Outstanding Service and Joint Service Commendation Award from the U.S. National Security Council while serving as special assistant to President George W. Bush.

== See also ==
- List of law clerks for the chief justice of the United States
- David Satterfield
- Jim Jeffrey
- Joel Rayburn
- Michael Mulroy

== Notes ==
Diplomatic posts
Preceded by John Allen	Special Presidential Envoy for the Global Coalition to Counter the Islamic State of Iraq and the Levant; 2015–2018	Succeeded by James Jeffrey
