= List of ambassadors of the United States to Tunisia =

Ambassador of the United States to Tunisia
- سفارة الولايات المتحدة في تونس
- Seal of the United States Department of State

- Flag of a United States ambassador

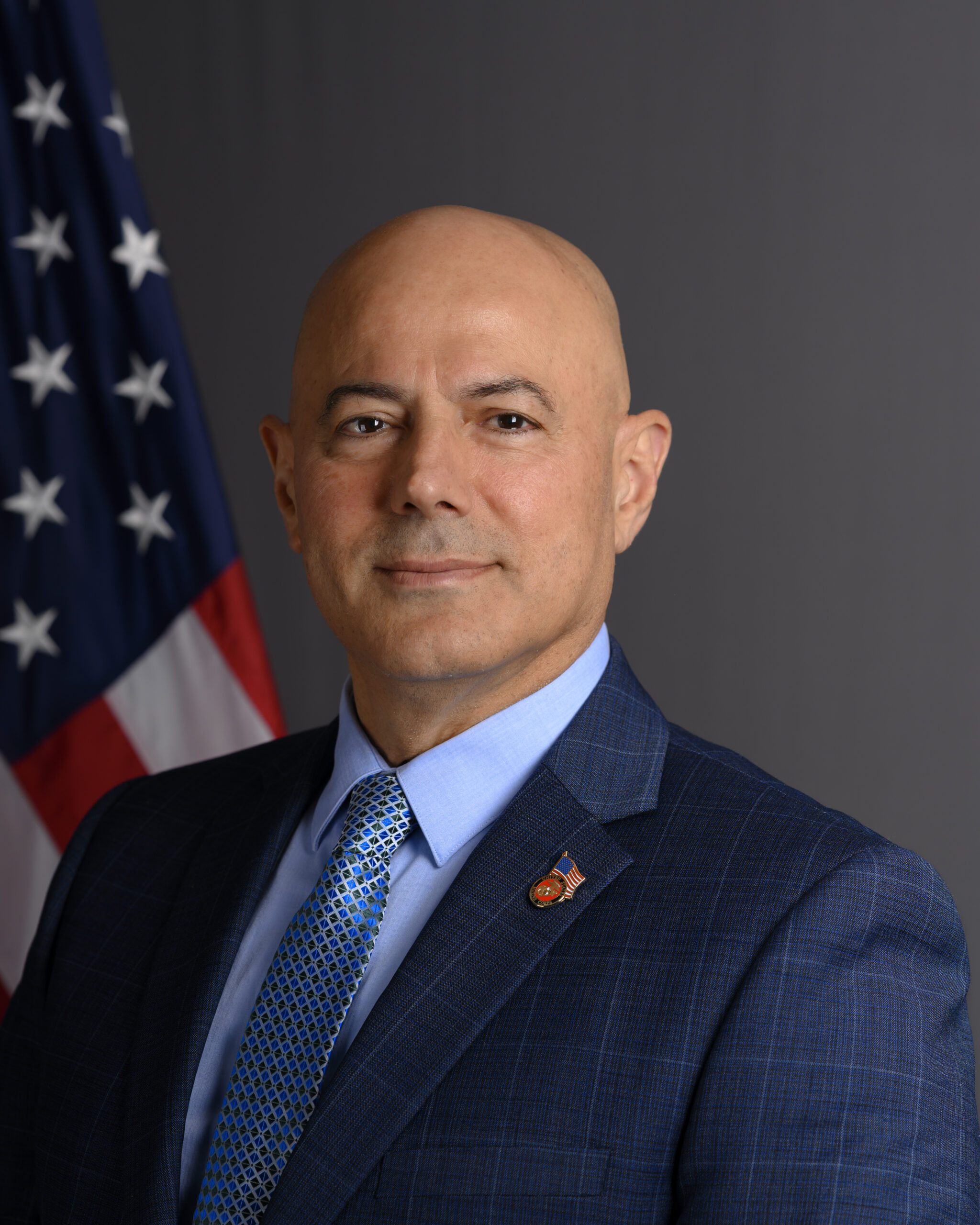
- Incumbent; Bill Bazzi since November 21, 2025
- Nominator: The president of the United States
- Inaugural holder: Morris N. Hughes as Chargé d'Affaires
- Formation: June 6, 1956
- Website: U.S. Embassy – Tunis

The following is a list of United States ambassadors to Tunisia.

== History: US consul in Tunis ==
- 1795–1796: Joseph Donaldson Jr. (consul in Algiers)
- 1795–1797: Samuel D. Heap (acting consul)
- 1796–1797: Joseph Étienne Famin (French, special diplomatic agent)
  - 1797–1797: William Eaton (treaty negotiator)
  - 1797–1797: Samuel D. Heap (treaty negotiator)
- 1797–1803: William Eaton (consul)
  - 1798–1798: James Leander Cathcart (treaty negotiator)
  - 1798–1798: Richard O'brien (special negotiator)
- 1803–1803: James Leander Cathcart (consul)
- 1813–1815: Mordecai Manuel Noah
- 1815–1819: Thomas D. Anderson
- 1819–1824: Townsend Stith
- 1824–1825: Charles D. (b) Coxe
- 1825–1841: Samuel D. Heap
- 1842–1845: John Howard Payne
- 1851–1852: John Howard Payne
- 1862 – ?: Amos Perry

== Ambassadors ==
Name	Title	Appointed	Presented credentials	Terminated mission	Notes
Morris N. Hughes – career FSO	Chargé d'affaires	June 6, 1956	June 6, 1956	October 4, 1956	
G. Lewis Jones – career FSO	Ambassador extraordinary and plenipotentiary	July 27, 1956	October 4, 1956	June 11, 1959	Presented new credentials on December 9, 1957, when Tunisia became a republic
Walter N. Walmsley – career FSO	Ambassador extraordinary and plenipotentiary	July 28, 1959	October 4, 1959	July 25, 1962	
Francis H. Russell – career FSO	Ambassador extraordinary and plenipotentiary	September 10, 1962	October 16, 1962	July 18, 1969	
John A. Calhoun – career FSO	Ambassador extraordinary and plenipotentiary	July 8, 1969	July 24, 1969	May 31, 1972	
Talcott W. Seelye – career FSO	Ambassador extraordinary and plenipotentiary	September 11, 1972	October 20, 1972	March 22, 1976	
Edward W. Mulcahy – career FSO	Ambassador extraordinary and plenipotentiary	March 4, 1976	May 31, 1976	January 5, 1979	
Stephen Warren Bosworth – career FSO	Ambassador extraordinary and plenipotentiary	February 9, 1979	March 27, 1979	June 22, 1981	
Walter Leon Cutler – career FSO	Ambassador extraordinary and plenipotentiary	December 11, 1981	March 2, 1982	January 2, 1984	
Peter Sebastian – career FSO	Ambassador extraordinary and plenipotentiary	June 11, 1984	July 3, 1984	February 19, 1987	
Robert H. Pelletreau – career FSO	Ambassador extraordinary and plenipotentiary	June 15, 1987	July 1, 1987	May 11, 1991	
John T. McCarthy – career FSO	Ambassador extraordinary and plenipotentiary	July 2, 1991	August 2, 1991	July 16, 1994	
Mary Ann Casey – career FSO	Ambassador extraordinary and plenipotentiary	July 5, 1994	September 23, 1994	July 18, 1997	
Robin Lynn Raphel – career FSO	Ambassador extraordinary and plenipotentiary	November 7, 1997	December 18, 1997	August 6, 2000	
Rust Macpherson Deming – career FSO	Ambassador extraordinary and plenipotentiary	December 28, 2000	November 30, 2001	May 17, 2003	
William J. Hudson – career FSO	Ambassador extraordinary and plenipotentiary	December 12, 2003	January 12, 2004	April 14, 2006	
Robert F. Godec – career FSO	Ambassador extraordinary and plenipotentiary	May 30, 2006	January 17, 2007	July 29, 2009	
Gordon Gray – career FSO	Ambassador extraordinary and plenipotentiary	August 20, 2009	November 19, 2009	July 5, 2012	
Jacob Walles – career FSO	Ambassador extraordinary and plenipotentiary	June 21, 2012	July 24, 2012	September 2, 2015	
Daniel Rubinstein – career FSO	Ambassador extraordinary and plenipotentiary	October 15, 2015	October 26, 2015	January 15, 2019	
Donald Blome – career FSO	Ambassador extraordinary and plenipotentiary	January 9, 2019	February 21, 2019	April 5, 2022	
Joey R. Hood – career FSO	Ambassador extraordinary and plenipotentiary	December 26, 2022	February 2, 2023	October 23, 2025	
Bill Bazzi – political appointee	Ambassador extraordinary and plenipotentiary	October 7, 2025	November 21, 2025	Present	

== See also ==
- Tunisia – United States relations
- Foreign relations of Tunisia
- Ambassadors of the United States
