= James Franklin Jeffrey =

American diplomat (born 1946)

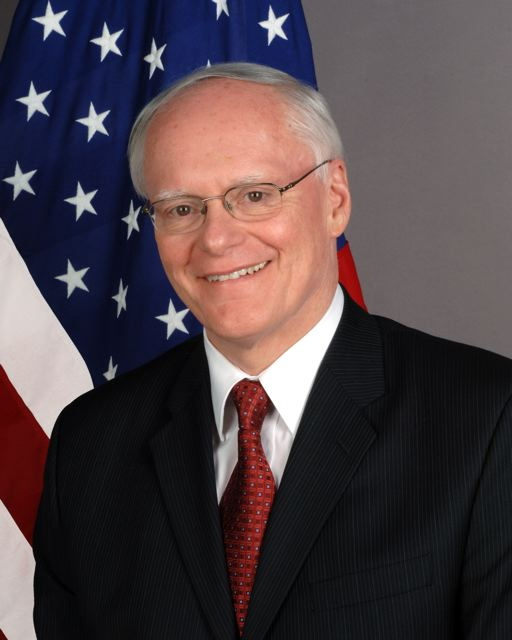

Special Presidential Envoy for the Global Coalition to Counter the Islamic State of Iraq and the Levant
- In office January 4, 2019 – November 13, 2020
- President: Donald Trump
- Preceded by: Brett McGurk
- Succeeded by: Nathan Sales

United States Special Representative for Syria Engagement
- In office August 17, 2018 – November 13, 2020
- President: Donald Trump
- Preceded by: Position established
- Succeeded by: Joel Rayburn

United States Ambassador to Iraq
- In office August 18, 2010 – June 1, 2012
- President: Barack Obama
- Preceded by: Christopher R. Hill
- Succeeded by: Robert S. Beecroft

United States Ambassador to Turkey
- In office December 3, 2008 – July 31, 2010
- President: George W. Bush; Barack Obama
- Preceded by: Ross Wilson
- Succeeded by: Francis J. Ricciardone Jr.

23rd United States Deputy National Security Advisor
- In office August 1, 2007 – December 3, 2008
- President: George W. Bush
- Preceded by: Jack Dyer Crouch II
- Succeeded by: Tom Donilon

10th United States Ambassador to Albania
- In office October 22, 2002 – May 2, 2004
- President: George W. Bush
- Preceded by: Joseph Limprecht
- Succeeded by: Marcie Berman Ries

Personal details
- Born: February 8, 1946 (age 80) Saugus, Massachusetts, U.S.
- Party: Independent
- Education: Northeastern University (BA); Boston University (MBA)

James Franklin Jeffrey (born February 8, 1946) is an American diplomat who served most recently as the United States Special Representative for Syria Engagement and the Special Envoy to the International military intervention against ISIL.

He has held senior assignments in Washington, D.C., and abroad, including as United States Ambassador to Iraq (2010–2012); United States Ambassador to Turkey (2008–2010); Deputy National Security Advisor (2007–2008); and United States Ambassador to Albania (2002–2004). In 2010 Jeffrey was appointed to the highest rank in the U.S. Foreign Service, Career Ambassador. From 1969 to 1976, Jeffrey was a U.S. Army infantry officer, with service in Germany and Vietnam.

Jeffrey is a visiting fellow at the Washington Institute for Near East Policy, a member of the CIA External Advisory Board, a member of the American Council on Germany, and a member of the Council on Foreign Relations. He serves on the advisory board for America Abroad Media. He is a frequent commentator on broader foreign policy, national security, and economic trends.

== Early life and education ==
Jeffrey was born in Saugus, Massachusetts, in 1946. He received a BA in History from Northeastern University in 1969, and an MBA from Boston University Graduate School of Management in 1977. Jeffrey also holds a diploma in the French language from the University of Paris. In addition to his native English, he speaks German, Turkish, and French.

== Career ==
=== European security affairs ===
Jeffrey joined the US Foreign Service in 1977. After a training assignment in Tunis, Tunisia he was posted to Sofia, Bulgaria, where he served as the on-site U.S. representative during a hijacking of a Turkish Air Flight with five U.S. businessmen taken as hostages, in May 1981. Jeffrey then served on assignments in Adana and Ankara, Turkey as a political-military officer, from 1983 to 1987.

Jeffrey served in Munich, Germany, during the dissolution of the Soviet Union and the reunification of Germany, from 1989 to 1991, including as acting principal officer during the first Gulf War, and liaison to Radio Free Europe. He then was selected as the US State Department's coordinator for the Conference for Security and Cooperation in Europe (now OSCE). Jeffrey later served as the Deputy Presidential Special Advisor for Bosnia Implementation, working to put into place the Dayton Accords.

=== Middle East affairs ===
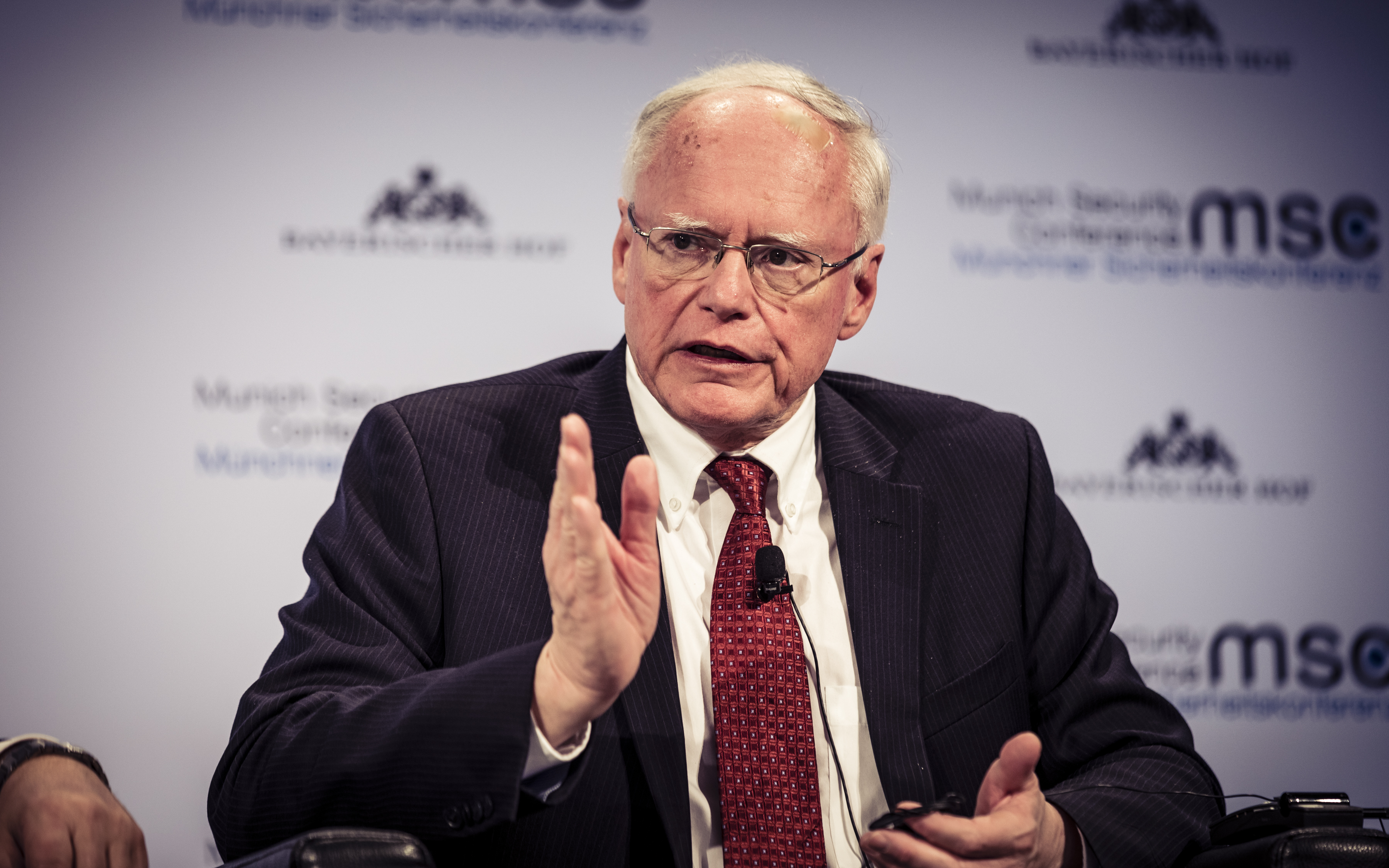
Jeffrey during the MSC 2019

In 1996 Jeffrey was selected as Deputy Chief of Mission to the American Embassy Kuwait, and served during Operation Desert Fox and the evacuation of Embassy Kuwait. In 1999 he returned to Turkey, as Deputy Chief of Mission. After serving as Ambassador to Albania from 2002 to 2004, he was selected by Secretary of State Colin Powell and Ambassador John Negroponte to bridge the transition from the Coalition Provisional Authority to the new U.S. Embassy in Baghdad, and subsequently served as Deputy Chief of Mission from 2004 to 2005. He served as Chargé d'Affaires in Baghdad before returning to Washington to serve as Secretary of State Condoleezza Rice’s Special Advisor for Iraq from 2006 to 2007. Jeffrey then served as Principal Deputy Assistant Secretary for Near Eastern Affairs, covering broader Middle East policy matters, including co-chairing the Interagency Iran Policy Group.

President George W. Bush nominated Jeffrey as Ambassador to Turkey in 2008, where he served in his fourth and final assignment to Turkey until 2010. President Barack Obama nominated him to serve as Ambassador to Iraq in 2010. Jeffrey oversaw its expansion into the largest Embassy in the world with almost 16,000 employees and an annual budget of over $6 billion, and worked with the U.S. military to ensure a successful transition to a civilian lead. According to Voice of America, after this successful transition, Iraq is now increasingly coming under the control of Iran.

=== Deputy National Security Adviser ===
In the summer of 2007, Jeffrey was selected to serve on detail to the White House as Assistant to the President and Deputy National Security Adviser for President George W. Bush, serving as acting National Security Adviser on Bush's 2007 and 2008 trips to the Pacific nations.

=== Trump administration ===
Jeffrey was amongst 50 Republican national security officials who in August 2016 signed a letter stating Donald Trump was not "qualified to be President and Commander-in-Chief" and "would put at risk our country’s national security and well-being", so would not be voting for him.

Nevertheless, in 2018 the Trump administration appointed Jeffrey United States Special Representative for Syria Engagement and in 2019 also Special Presidential Envoy for the Global Coalition to Counter the Islamic State of Iraq and the Levant. Since assuming the posts he often visited Turkey to discuss the events relating to the Syrian Civil War, and also supported the presence of Turkish forces in Idlib.

In a 2020 interview, Jeffrey acknowledged that he and other officials misled senior Trump administration officials over the number of troops in Syria.

== Recognition ==
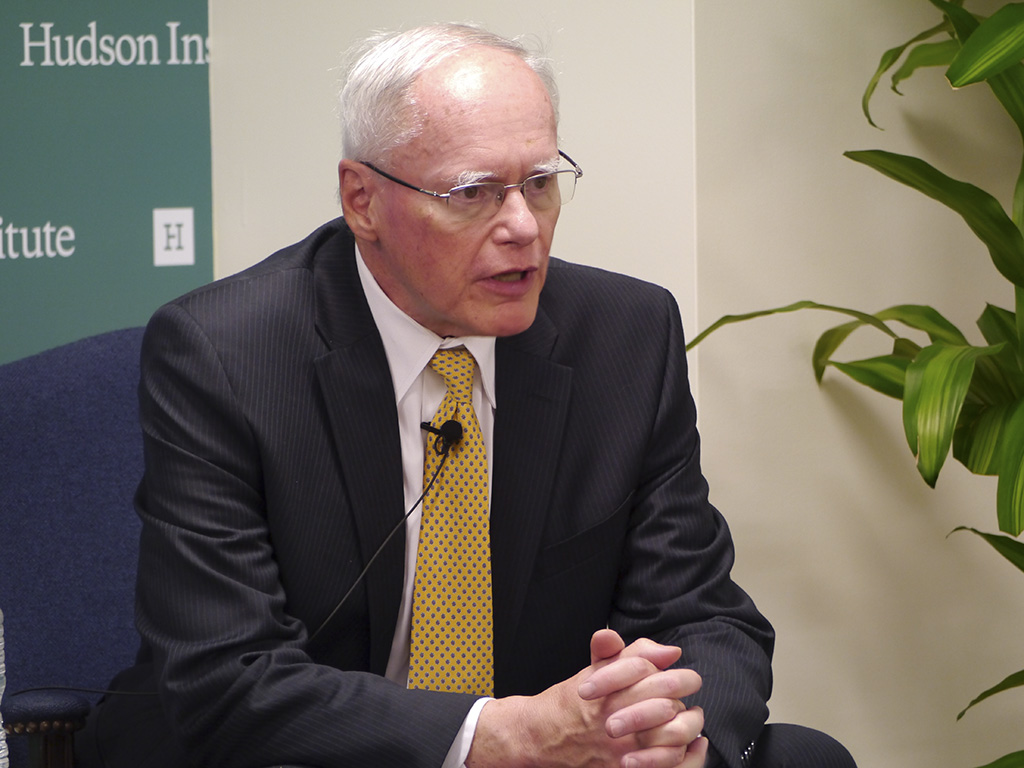
Jeffrey at a panel discussion on Turkey, the Kurds, and the Middle East at Hudson Institute 2015

Jeffrey has received the Secretary of State's Distinguished Service Award on two occasions, in 2010 and 2012, as well as the Secretary of State's Career Service Award in 2012, and the Distinguished Honor Award in 2005. Secretary Leon Panetta presented him with the Department of Defense Medal for Distinguished Civilian Service in 2011, and CIA Director David Petraeus awarded Jeffrey the Director's Medal in 2012. He received Boston University's School of Management Award for Distinguished Service in 2006, and the American Bar Association's Award for Promoting Rule of Law Worldwide in 2004. His military awards include the Bronze Star.

== Personal life ==
Jeffrey is married, has two children, and is a resident of Virginia.

== Sources ==
- The information of this article comes from the U.S. Department of State website .

Diplomatic posts
Preceded by Joseph Limprecht	United States Ambassador to Albania; 2002–2004	Succeeded by Marcie Berman Ries
Preceded by Ross Wilson	United States Ambassador to Turkey; 2008–2010	Succeeded by Francis J. Ricciardone Jr.
Preceded by Christopher R. Hill	United States Ambassador to Iraq; 2010–2012	Succeeded by Robert S. Beecroft
New office	Special Representative for Syria Engagement; 2018–2020	Succeeded by Joel Rayburn
Preceded by Brett McGurk	Special Presidential Envoy for the Global Coalition to Counter the Islamic State of Iraq and the Levant; 2019–2020	Succeeded by Nathan Sales
Political offices
Preceded by Jack Dyer Crouch II	Deputy National Security Advisor; 2007–2008	Succeeded by Tom Donilon
