= Gordon Gray III =

American diplomat

Gordon Gray
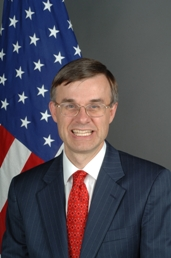

United States Ambassador to Tunisia
- In office November 19, 2009 – July 5, 2012
- President: Barack Obama
- Preceded by: Robert F. Godec
- Succeeded by: Jacob Walles

Personal details
- Born: 1956 (age 69–70) New York City, New York, U.S.
- Education: Yale University (BA); Columbia University (MIA)

Gordon Gray III (born 1956) is the Kuwait Professor of Gulf and Arabian Peninsula Affairs at George Washington University. He was previously a professor of practice at Penn State's School of International Affairs. He is a retired United States Foreign Service Officer and former career member of the Senior Foreign Service who attained the rank of minister-counselor. He joined the faculty of the National War College in July 2012 and held the positions of deputy commandant and international affairs advisor from June 2014 to June 2015. He was the U.S. ambassador to Tunisia, having been sworn in on August 20, 2009, after his appointment to the position by President Barack Obama, and served until July 5, 2012.

He retired from the Foreign Service in June 2015. In July 2015, he joined the National U.S.–Arab Chamber of Commerce as the organization's executive vice president, serving in that capacity until August 2017. He served as the chief operating officer of the Center for American Progress, a research and advocacy institute in Washington, DC, from September 2017 until October 2021.

Gray a distinguished diplomatic fellow at the Middle East Institute. Georgetown University's Institute for the Study of Diplomacy published Gray's case study on Tunisia and the start of the Arab Spring. Gray's other writings have been published by Time, Newsweek, The National Interest, The Journal of Diplomacy, Just Security, Manara Magazine,The Arab Weekly, Foreign Service Journal, The Hill, Frankfurter Rundschau, Euronews, The Washington Diplomat, National Security Journal, The Diplomatic Pouch, and translated into French by Leaders, a Tunisian magazine.

Gray serves on the Board of Directors of American Near East Refugee Aid (Anera), AMIDEAST and the Tunisian-American Young Professionals Association as well as on the global advisory council of Education for Employment.

== Biography ==
Gordon Gray III was born in New York City in 1956. He attended Yale University, receiving his B.A. in political science in 1978. Gray later served in the Peace Corps in Oued Zem, Morocco until 1980. He then attended Columbia University, from which he graduated in 1982 with a Master of International Affairs. In 2015, he received an honorary M.S. from the National Defense University.

Gray began his Foreign Service career in 1982. His first tours of duty included postings in Karachi, Amman, and Ottawa. He was appointed as director of the Counterterrorism Regional Affairs Office at the Department of State in 1996 and held the post until 1999. As director for regional affairs in the Office of the Coordinator for Counter-terrorism before 9/11, Gray predicted the rising threat of Bin Laden and Al Qaeda. He was then appointed as the director of the Office of Peacekeeping and Humanitarian Operations from 1999 to 2001. Between 2002 and 2005, Gray served as the deputy chief of mission at the U.S. Embassy in Cairo. While holding this post, Gray became the first U.S. diplomat to visit Tripoli in 2004.

In 2005, Gray served as the Deputy Assistant Secretary of State for Near Eastern Affairs in the State Department, a position which he held until mid-2008. He then spent eleven months in Baghdad as a senior advisor to then-U.S. Ambassador Ryan C. Crocker. During that time, Gray traveled extensively in southern Iraq assessing the reestablishment of governance and infrastructure in the southern provinces.

Gray was sworn in as the United States Ambassador to Tunisia in August 2009, assuming his post the following month.

=== Turmoil in Tunisia ===
Gray's tenure has seen him involved in two diplomatic incidents relating to Tunisia. During the release of classified State Department cables, it was revealed that Gray criticized the Tunisian government's human rights record and its policies relating to press freedom. Additionally, he was one of the first to identify Sakher El Materi, a Tunisian businessman and Zine El Abidine Ben Ali's son-in-law, as a potential beneficiary of the ancien regime's nepotism. Gray had been, however, an early and consistent proponent of democracy in Tunisia. Indeed, he is credited with informing former President Ben Ali not only that he needed to relinquish power, but that he could not count United States for exile. In WikiLeaks cables, Gray has also commented on the political aptitude of Tunisian Prime Minister Mohamed Ghannouchi, who temporarily assumed control of the country following former President Ben Ali's departure, stating that "it appears Ben Ali has come to view him as indispensable." During protests which contributed to President Ben Ali's departure, Gray was summoned to explain American encouragement of political demonstration and the American response stating that Tunisia had used excessive violence against protesters. U.S. State Department spokesman Philip Crowley stated that the purpose of Gray's meeting was to express the Obama administration's wariness toward said violence, with 27 protesters having died before the meeting took place. The U.S. response to Tunisian riots was poorly received, and as such it was Gray who was called to explain the reasons for the Obama administration's condemnation of the Ben Ali regime's handling of the unrest. In regard to the Tunisian political upheaval in January 2011, Ambassador Gray has come out calling for both protesters and government forces alike to act with responsibility, noting that democratic demonstrations are a "new phenomenon" in Tunisia

In May 2012, Gray criticized a Tunisian court's charges of "disturbing public order" and "threatening public morals" against TV magnate Nabil Karoui, who aired a French film which violates a prohibition in Islam by showing a depiction of God. After Gray stated that "[Karoui's] conviction raises serious concerns about tolerance and freedom of expression in the new Tunisia", the Tunisian Foreign Ministry expressed its displeasure with Gray's comments and decried perceived US interference in the Tunisian judicial system.

As Gray prepared to leave his post in July 2012, he expressed optimism over Tunisia's future thanks to the nation's capable government and military, adding that a stable democracy is well within the country's grasp. He reiterated his confidence in Tunisian civil society in an op-ed piece Time published on October 9, 2015, the day the Tunisian National Dialogue Quartet was awarded the Nobel Peace Prize.

Gray has twice received the Presidential Meritorious Service award, as well as other awards for exceptional service. In recognition of Gray's support for Tunisia's transition to democracy, on July 4, 2012, President Marzouki awarded him the highest civilian decoration Tunisia grants to foreigners, the "Grand Officier de l'Ordre de la République".

Diplomatic posts
Preceded by Robert F. Godec	United States Ambassador to Tunisia; 2009–2012	Succeeded by Jacob Walles
