= Donald Blome =

American diplomat

Ambassador Donald Blome
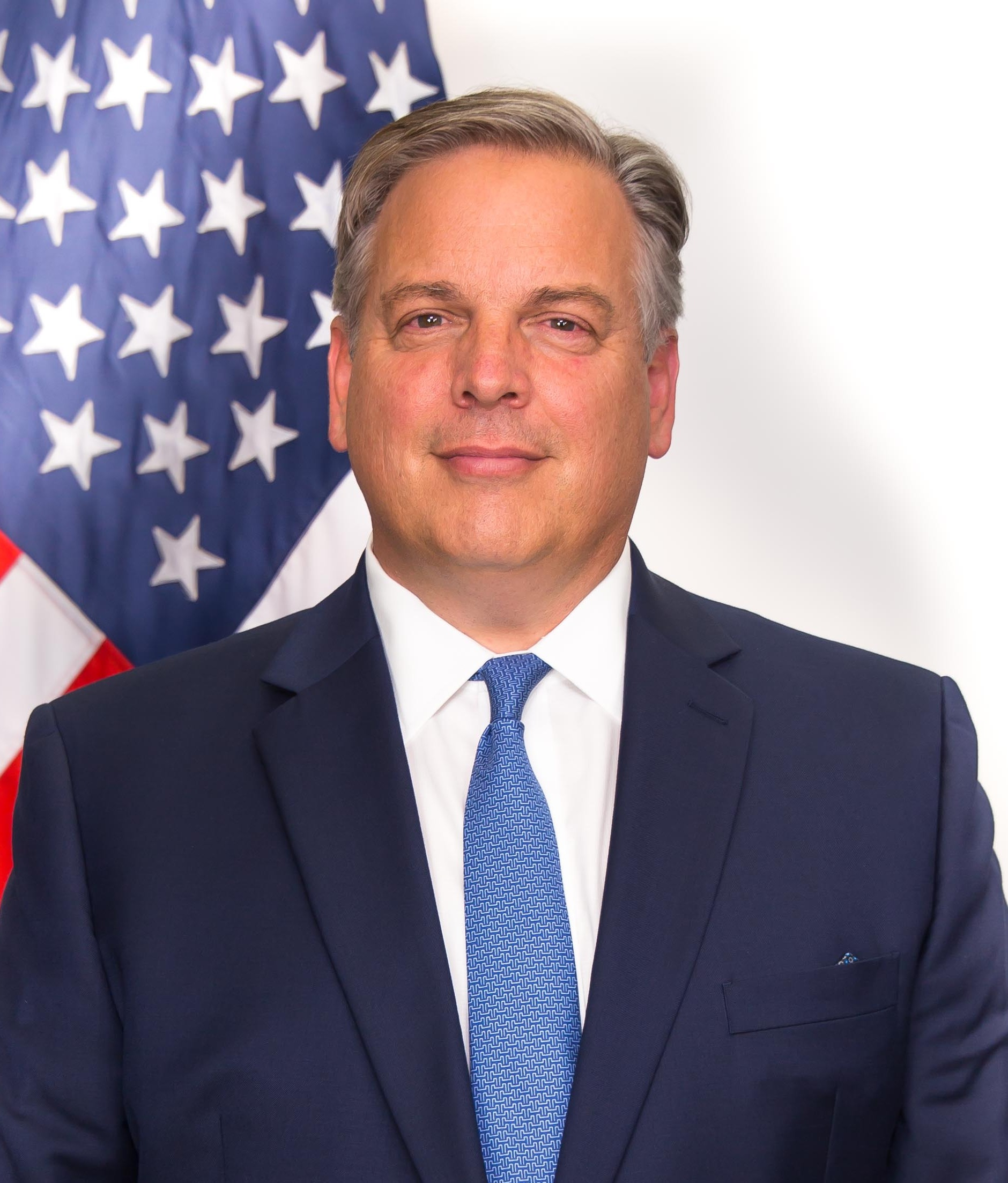

26th Assistant Secretary of State for Near Eastern Affairs
- Incumbent
- Assumed office August 17, 2026
- President: Donald Trump
- Preceded by: Barbara A. Leaf

Assistant Secretary of State for Intelligence and Research
- Acting
- In office February 3, 2025 – August 17, 2026
- President: Donald Trump
- Preceded by: Leila Gardner (Acting)
- Succeeded by: Michael Vance

United States Ambassador to Pakistan
- In office July 1, 2022 – January 10, 2025
- President: Joe Biden
- Preceded by: David Hale (2018)
- Succeeded by: Natalie Baker (Chargé d'affaires)

United States Ambassador to Tunisia
- In office February 21, 2019 – April 5, 2022
- President: Donald Trump; Joe Biden
- Preceded by: Daniel Rubinstein
- Succeeded by: Joey R. Hood

United States Consul General in Jerusalem
- In office July 2015 – August 2018
- President: Barack Obama; Donald Trump
- Preceded by: Michael Ratney
- Succeeded by: Karen Sasahara

Personal details
- Education: University of Michigan (BA, JD)
- Donald Blome's voice Blome's opening statement at his confirmation hearing to be United States ambassador to Pakistan; Recorded December 14, 2021

Donald Armin Blome is an American diplomat who is currently serving as the Assistant Secretary of State for Near Eastern Affairs since August 2026. He previously served as the Acting Assistant Secretary of State for Intelligence and Research and the United States ambassador to Pakistan. He also served as the United States ambassador to Tunisia from 2019 to 2022.

== Early life and education ==
Blome received a Bachelor of Arts and a Juris Doctor from the University of Michigan.

== Career ==
Prior to joining the government, Blome worked as an attorney in Chicago, Illinois.

Blome joined the foreign service in 1993, and is a career member of the Senior Foreign Service with the rank of Minister-Counselor. He previously served as the U.S. Ambassador to Tunisia. Prior to that, he served in a series of foreign posts including:

- 2019–2022: Chargé d'Affaires a.i. at the Libya External Office in Tunis, Tunisia.
- 2015–2018: Consul General at the U.S. Consulate in Jerusalem.
- 2013–2015: Director of the Office of Arabian Peninsula Affairs at the U.S. Department of State.
- 2012–2013: Political Counselor at the U.S. Embassy in Kabul.
- 2009–2012: Minister-Counselor for Economic and Political Affairs at the U.S. Embassy in Cairo.
- 2007–2008: Civilian Co-Director at the Multinational Force Strategic Engagement Cell in Baghdad
- 2006–2007: Political Counselor at the U.S. Embassy in Kuwait.
- 2001–2004: Israel Desk Officer, Deputy Director and Acting Director, Office of Israel and Palestinian Affairs.

=== United States Ambassador to Tunisia ===
In August 2018, President Donald Trump nominated Blome to serve as U.S. Ambassador to Tunisia. His nomination was confirmed in the United States Senate by voice vote on January 2, 2019. He was sworn into office on January 9, 2019. He presented his credentials to President Beji Caid Essebsi on February 7, 2019.

=== United States Ambassador to Pakistan ===
On October 19, 2021, President Joe Biden nominated Blome to be the next United States Ambassador to Pakistan and different parts of the world. The Senate Foreign Relations Committee held hearings on Blome's nomination on December 14, 2021. The committee favorably reported his nomination to the Senate floor on January 12, 2022. The Senate confirmed Blome's nomination on March 1, 2022, by voice vote. He was sworn into office on April 11, 2022, and he arrived in the country on May 23, 2022. He presented his credentials on July 1, 2022.

== Personal life ==
Blome is fluent in Arabic.

== See also ==
- Ambassadors of the United States

Diplomatic posts
Preceded by Daniel Rubinstein	United States Ambassador to Tunisia; 2019–2022	Succeeded by Joey R. Hood
Preceded by David Hale	United States Ambassador to Pakistan; 2022–2025	Succeeded by Natalie A. Baker (Chargé d'affaires)
