= Daniel Bennett Smith =

American diplomat (born 1956)

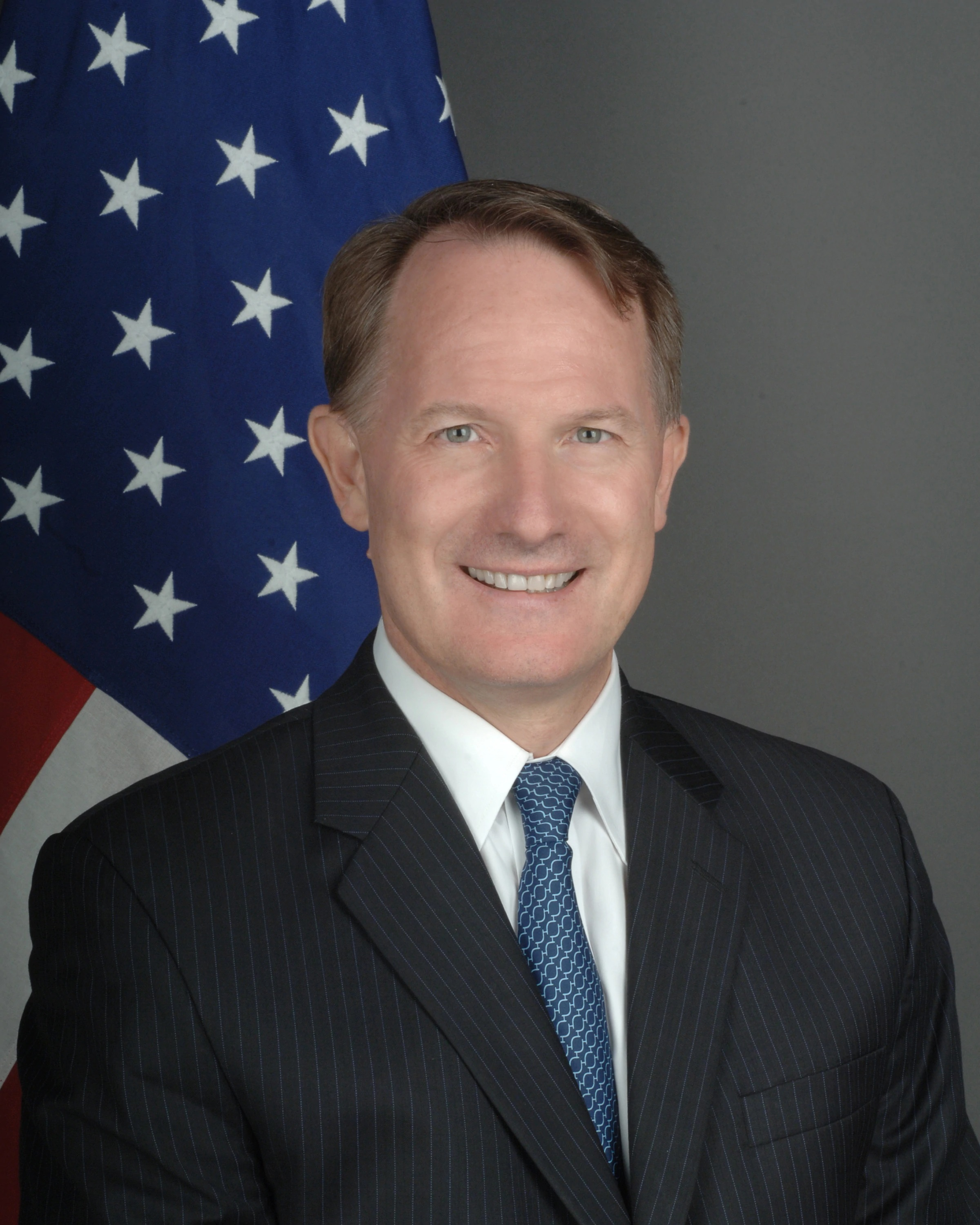

Director of Foreign Service Institute
- In office October 26, 2018 – May 19, 2022
- President: Donald Trump; Joe Biden
- Preceded by: Nancy McEldowney
- Succeeded by: Joan A. Polaschik

U.S. Chargé d'affaires to India
- In office April 30, 2021 – June 29, 2021
- President: Joe Biden
- Preceded by: Donald Heflin
- Succeeded by: Atul Keshap

Acting United States Deputy Secretary of State
- In office January 26, 2021 – April 14, 2021
- President: Joe Biden
- Preceded by: Stephen Biegun
- Succeeded by: Wendy Sherman

Acting United States Secretary of State
- In office January 20, 2021 – January 26, 2021
- President: Joe Biden
- Preceded by: Stephen Biegun (acting)
- Succeeded by: Antony Blinken

19th Assistant Secretary of State for Intelligence and Research
- In office February 14, 2014 – October 23, 2018
- President: Barack Obama; Donald Trump
- Preceded by: Philip Goldberg
- Succeeded by: Ellen E. McCarthy

United States Ambassador to Greece
- In office September 28, 2010 – August 5, 2013
- President: Barack Obama
- Preceded by: Daniel V. Speckhard
- Succeeded by: David D. Pearce

22nd Executive Secretary of the United States Department of State
- In office 2007–2009
- Preceded by: Harry K. Thomas Jr.
- Succeeded by: Stephen D. Mull

Personal details
- Born: March 6, 1956 (age 70) Redwood City, California, U.S.
- Education: University of Colorado Boulder (BA); Stanford University (MA, PhD)

Daniel Bennett Smith (born March 6, 1956) is an American diplomat who served as the director of the Foreign Service Institute and acting United States Secretary of State at the presidential transition of Joe Biden. He has held the rank of career ambassador since September 2018. He previously served as Assistant Secretary of State for Intelligence and Research at the United States Department of State, assuming that post on February 14, 2014. He is considered a veteran diplomat by the U.S. diplomatic community.

== Early life and education ==
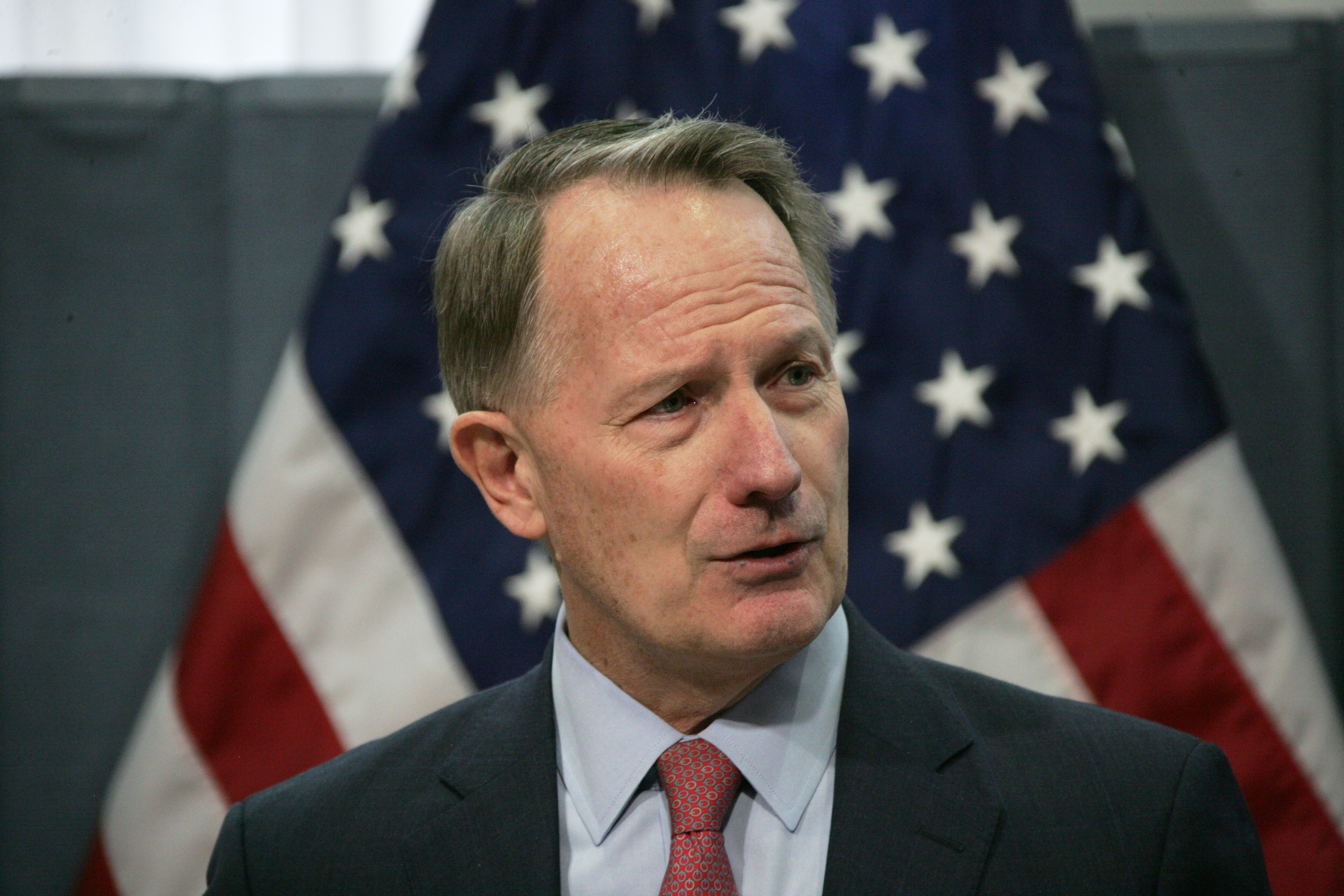
Smith delivers remarks at his swearing-in ceremony at the Foreign Service Institute at the George P. Shultz National Foreign Affairs Training Center in Arlington, Virginia on October 26, 2018.

Smith obtained a Bachelor of Arts degree in history from the University of Colorado Boulder, followed by a Master of Arts and PhD from Stanford University. His dissertation is titled "Toward Internationalism: New Deal Foreign Economic Policy, 1933–39", and was completed in 1983.

== Career ==
Under President Barack Obama, Smith served as the United States Ambassador to Greece from 2010 to 2013.

In 2018, Smith was selected to serve as the Director of the Foreign Service Institute.

In 2021, President Joe Biden selected Smith to serve as the acting secretary of state until his nominee for the position, Antony Blinken, was confirmed by the United States Senate. Blinken was confirmed on January 26, 2021. On May 3, 2021, Smith was appointed as US envoy to India.

Political offices
Preceded by Stephen Biegun; Acting	United States Secretary of State; Acting; 2021	Succeeded by Antony Blinken
Preceded by Stephen Biegun	United States Deputy Secretary of State; Acting; 2021	Succeeded by Wendy Sherman
