= Daniel Rubinstein =

American diplomat

Ambassador Daniel Rubinstein
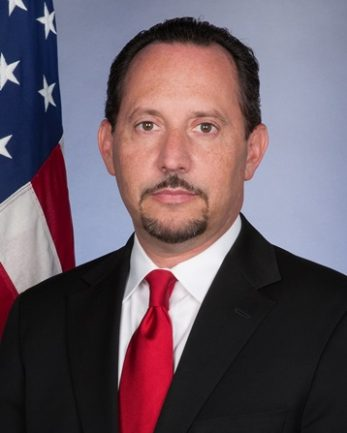

United States Ambassador to Tunisia
- In office October 22, 2015 – January 15, 2019
- President: Barack Obama; Donald Trump
- Preceded by: Jacob Walles
- Succeeded by: Donald Blome

United States Special Envoy for Syria
- In office March 17, 2014 – July 27, 2015
- President: Barack Obama
- Preceded by: Robert Ford (as Ambassador)
- Succeeded by: Michael Ratney

United States Consul General in Jerusalem
- In office September 6, 2009 – July 29, 2012
- President: Barack Obama
- Preceded by: Jacob Walles
- Succeeded by: Michael Ratney

Personal details
- Born: 1967 (age 58–59)
- Spouse: Julie Adams
- Education: University of California, Berkeley

Daniel H. Rubinstein (born 1967) is a United States Foreign Service Officer who has served in a series of diplomatic posts including as United States Ambassador to Tunisia from 2015 to 2019.

== Career ==
Rubinstein is a graduate of the University of California at Berkeley. A career member of the Senior Foreign Service, Rubinstein also served as Consul General and Chief of Mission in Jerusalem from 2009 to 2012, Deputy Chief of Mission at the U.S. Embassy in Amman, Jordan from 2005 to 2008, and as Chief of the Civilian Observer Unit in the Multinational Force and Observers in Sinai, Egypt. Earlier, he served as Director of the Office of Israel and Palestinian Affairs in the Department of State from 2004 to 2005. Rubinstein speaks Arabic, Hebrew, and Portuguese.

Rubinstein, one of the State Department's leading "Arabists," replaced Ambassador Robert Ford as the US Special Envoy to Syria.

In March 2014, U.S. Secretary of State John Kerry announced that Rubinstein would replace Robert Stephen Ford as the United States Special Envoy for Syria. Rubinstein served as Ambassador from October 2015 to January 2019.

Rubinstein was appointed as Charge d'Affaires ad interim at the US Embassy in Cairo on August 23, 2022.

Rubinstein was appointed as Chargé d'Affaires ad interim to Sudan on February 23, 2024. He left the post in May 2024.

Diplomatic posts
Preceded by Jacob Walles	United States Consul General in Jerusalem; 2009–2012	Succeeded by Michael Ratney
Preceded by Robert Ford as United States Ambassador to Syria	United States Special Envoy for Syria; 2014–2015	Succeeded by Michael Ratney
Preceded by Jacob Walles	United States Ambassador to Tunisia; 2015–2019	Succeeded by Donald Blome
