= Richard W. Erdman =

American diplomat (born 1945)

12th Ambassador of the United States to Algeria
- In office July 26, 2003 – January 9, 2006
- President: George W. Bush
- Preceded by: Janet A. Sanderson
- Succeeded by: Robert Stephen Ford

Personal details
- Born: 1945 (age 80–81) Oak Park, Illinois
- Education: Princeton University (BA); Johns Hopkins University (MA)

Richard W. Erdman (born 1945) is an American former diplomat who was a career Foreign Service Officer. He served as Ambassador Extraordinary and Plenipotentiary to Algeria from 2003 until 2006, with the rank of Minister Counselor.

Erdman was born in Oak Park, Illinois in 1945. He was Senior Area Adviser for the Middle East to the U.S. Delegation to the 2002 United Nations General Assembly and Director for Jordan, Lebanon, and Syria in the Bureau of Near Eastern Affairs (2000–2002). He was the U.S. Special Envoy, head of the U.S. Delegation, and Chairman to the Israel Lebanon Monitoring Group, an ambassadorial-level position in which he led negotiations between Syria, Lebanon, and Israel concerning the fighting in southern Lebanon (1998–2000).

As Deputy Head of the International Border Monitoring Mission in Serbia, and Deputy Director for Eastern Europe (1993–94), he was the deputy to the President's Special Envoy on Former Yugoslavia and the Deputy Head of the U.S. delegation that negotiated the Bosnian Federation Constitution Agreement. His efforts, via personal negotiations, were a key step in ending the two-front war in Bosnia and the Dayton Accords.

Erdman graduated from Princeton University in 1967 with a degree in history. He also received a master's degree in international relations from the Johns Hopkins School for Advanced International Studies.
