= Bill Bazzi =

American politician

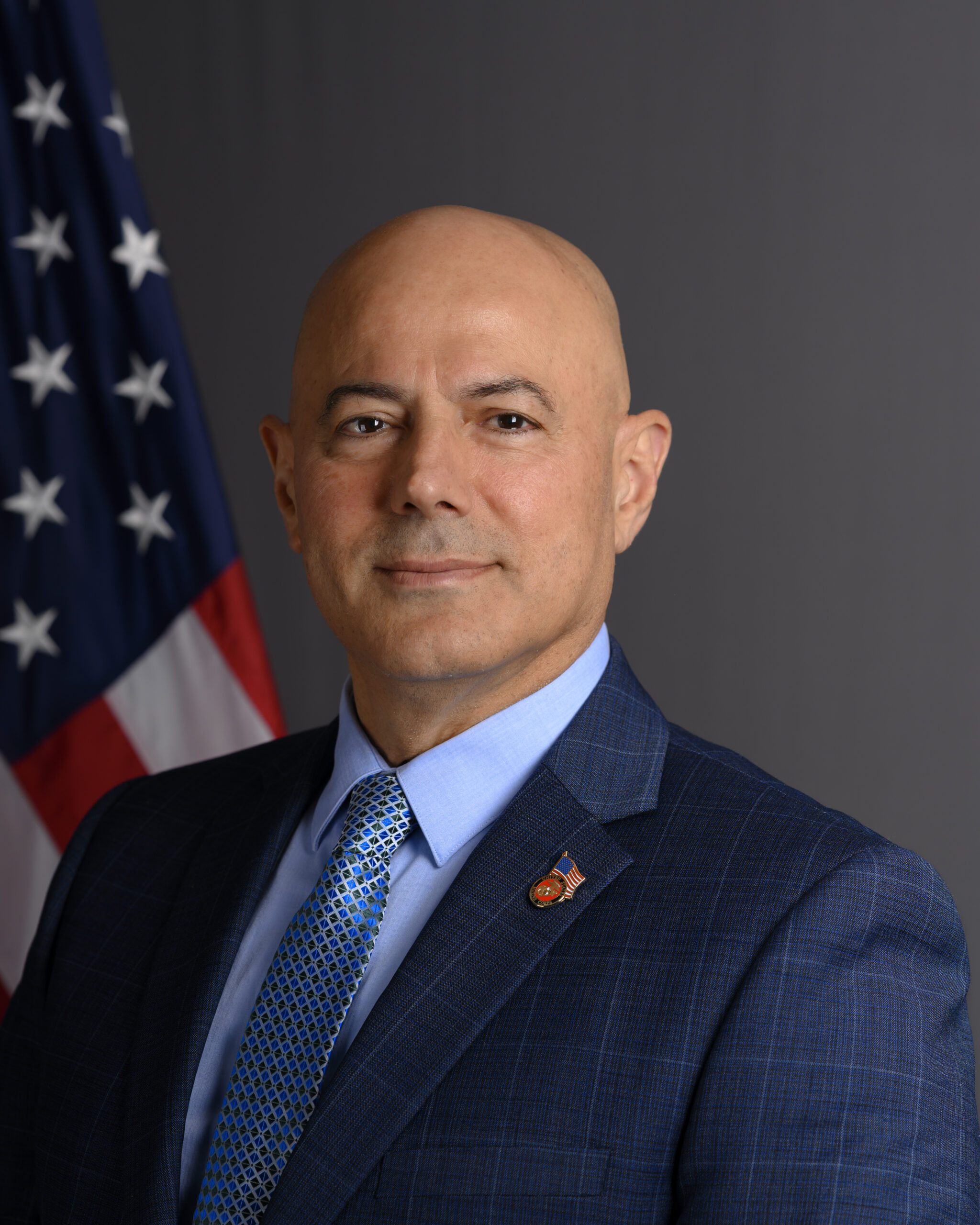
- Official portrait, 2025

United States Ambassador to Tunisia
- Incumbent
- Assumed office November 21, 2025
- President: Donald Trump
- Preceded by: Joey R. Hood

Mayor of Dearborn Heights
- In office January 26, 2021 – October 8, 2025
- Preceded by: Daniel S. Paletko
- Succeeded by: Mohamad Baydoun

Personal details
- Born: May 5, 1963 (age 63) Lebanon
- Party: Republican
- Spouse: Nadia Fadel-Bazzi
- Education: Embry–Riddle Aeronautical University (MS)

Military service
- Allegiance: United States
- Branch: United States Marine Corps; Marine Corps Reserve
- Service years: 1984–1988 (active); 1999–2016 (reserve / Active)
- Rank: Gunnery sergeant

Bill Bazzi is a Lebanese-American politician who served as the mayor of Dearborn Heights, Michigan from 2021 to 2025. In March 2025, Bazzi was named by U.S. President Donald Trump as his nominee for United States ambassador to Tunisia.

On October 8, 2025, Bazzi resigned as mayor following the Senate confirmation of his ambassadorship to Tunisia.

== Early life and education ==
Bill Bazzi was born in Lebanon and immigrated to the United States at the age of 12. Settling in Dearborn, Michigan in 1997, he attended Fordson High School, where he graduated. Following high school, Bazzi earned both a bachelor's and a master's degree in aeronautical engineering from Embry-Riddle Aeronautical University in Florida.

== Family ==
Bill Bazzi is married to Nadia Fadel-Bazzi.

== Military service ==
Bazzi enlisted in the United States Marine Corps after graduating high school, serving on active duty from 1984 to 1988. After completing his active duty, he continued his military career in the Marine Corps Reserve from 1999 to 2016. During his time in the reserves, Bazzi achieved the rank of Gunnery Sergeant and served in various roles, including with military police and intelligence units. His service included deployments to locations around the Horn of Africa, the Middle East, and other regions. Bazzi retired from the Marine Corps Reserve in 2016, concluding a 21-year military career.

In 2022, Bazzi was honored as the Veteran of Honor by the Metropolitan Detroit Veterans Coalition. The recognition took place during the organization's 17th annual Veterans Day Parade held in Corktown neighborhood in Detroit, Michigan.

== Professional career ==
In addition to his military service, Bazzi established a career in the aerospace and automotive industries. He worked at Boeing as a quality manager and lead auditor. In 1999, he joined Ford Motor Company as a product development engineer.

== Tenure as mayor ==
In July 2023, a former council member of Dearborn Heights petitioned the Wayne County Elections Commission to recall Mayor Bazzi after he created the role of police commissioner and hired a new police chief. This recall was unanimously rejected. The recall was appealed to the Wayne County Circuit Court which also rejected the recall.

In January 2024, the city council passed a vote of no confidence against Bazzi. This vote of no confidence was because of issues over the police department. The city council claims that Bazzi illegally created high up positions in the police department. Bazzi said that the city council is trying to stop investigations into corruption in the police department.

In June 2024, the mayor and the city council sparred over proposed budgets from Bazzi. The city council did not want to approve the budget because of the positions that they claimed were created illegally in the police department leadership. Bazzi proposed multiple budgets that were not acceptable to the city council and claimed that the city council was not working with him. The shutdown was later avoided after compromises were made. Also in June 2024, the chief of Police for Dearborn Heights resigned due to issues with the city council. Bazzi promoted the Police Department Director, Kevin Swope, to the role of Police Chief.

Bazzi endorsed Lena Arzouni as his successor for mayor in 2025. Arzouni placed third in the primary election with 7.74% of the vote, and did not advance to the general election.

On October 8, 2025, Bazzi officially resigned from his mayoral office following the Senate confirmation of Bazzi's ambassadorship to Tunisia by a vote of 51-47. Mohamad Baydoun, the city council president and one of the top-two vote getters in the primary, served as acting mayor. Baydoun was later elected to a full term.

== Trump endorsement ==
In October 2024, Bazzi endorsed presidential candidate Donald Trump, citing his belief that Trump would limit American involvement in Middle Eastern conflicts. and would deal with economic issues and immigration. He blamed the Biden administration for starting wars and referred to Trump as "a man of peace".

He indicated that a turning point in his support occurred when candidate Kamala Harris campaigned alongside former United States Representative Liz Cheney in Michigan during October 2024 because of Liz Cheney's association with her father, former Vice President Dick Cheney, who had a large involvement with the initial invasions of Iraq in the aftermath of the terrorist attacks of September 11, 2001. Following the start of the campaigning efforts by Harris and Liz Cheney, Bazzi decided to speak with Donald Trump, after which he released his public endorsement.

After Trump's final campaign rally in Grand Rapids, Michigan, on November 4, Bazzi made his own speech in the evening. He stated that his endorsement for Donald Trump was not impromptu, saying his mind was made up before candidate Joe Biden had dropped out of the 2024 race. Prior to the 2024 election, he had also voted for Trump in the 2016 and 2020 elections.
