= Jacob Walles =

American diplomat (born 1957)

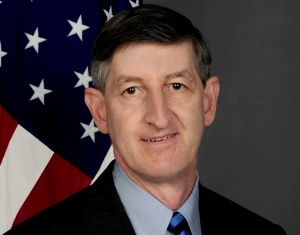

United States Ambassador to Tunisia
- In office July 24, 2012 – September 2, 2015
- President: Barack Obama
- Preceded by: Gordon Gray
- Succeeded by: Daniel Rubinstein

United States Consul General in Jerusalem
- In office July 20, 2005 – September 6, 2009
- President: George W. Bush; Barack Obama
- Preceded by: David Pearce
- Succeeded by: Daniel Rubinstein

Personal details
- Born: 1957 (age 68–69) Wilmington, Delaware, U.S.
- Education: Wesleyan University; Johns Hopkins University

Jacob Walles (born 1957) is an American retired diplomat who spent much of his career addressing the Arab-Israeli conflict. He was the U.S. Ambassador to the Republic of Tunisia from July 24, 2012 to September 2, 2015. He also served as Senior Advisor on Foreign Fighters in the Bureau of Counterterrorism in the Department of State from September 2015 to January 2017. From 2017 to 2024 he was a nonresident Senior Fellow at the Carnegie Endowment for International Peace.

On December 14, 2011, President Obama nominated Walles to be U.S. Ambassador to the Tunisian Republic. Walles was sworn in as Ambassador to Tunisia by Secretary of State Hillary Clinton on June 21, 2012, and he presented his credentials to Tunisian President Marzouki on July 24, 2012. He was the Ambassador in Tunis when the U.S. Embassy was attacked on September 14, 2012, in the wake of the Innocence of Muslims controversy. President Beji Caid Essebsi decorated Walles as "Grand Officier de l'Ordre de la République" in August 2015 in recognition of his work to promote relations between the United States and Tunisia.

From 2009 to 2010, he was the Cyrus Vance fellow for diplomatic studies at the Council on Foreign Relations. From June 2010 to April 2012, he was Deputy Assistant Secretary of State for Near East Affairs.

Walles was U.S. consul general and chief of mission in Jerusalem from July 2005 to August 2009. In that capacity, Walles was instructed to inform Palestinian President Mahmoud Abbas that the Hamas government was unacceptable. Walles's talking points said, "If you act along these lines, we'll support you both materially and politically".

Walles also served as Deputy Chief of Mission at the U.S. Embassy in Athens from 2003 to 2005, as Deputy Principal Officer at the U.S. Consulate General in Jerusalem from 1996 to 1998, as Economic Officer at the U.S. Embassy in Tel Aviv from 1988 to 1991, and as Vice Consul in Amsterdam from 1982 to 1984.

He was born in Wilmington, Delaware. Walles is a graduate of Wesleyan University and the School of Advanced International Studies of Johns Hopkins University. He is a member of the American Academy of Diplomacy.

Diplomatic posts
Preceded by David Pearce	United States Consul General in Jerusalem; 2005–2009	Succeeded by Daniel Rubinstein
Preceded by Gordon Gray	United States Ambassador to Tunisia; 2012–2015	Succeeded by Daniel Rubinstein
