= Robert Stephen Ford =

American diplomat (born 1958)

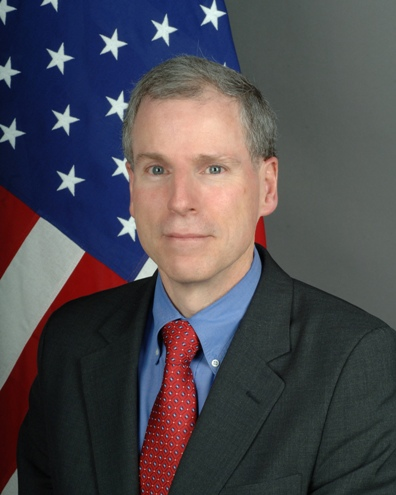
- Ford (c. 2011)

United States Ambassador to Syria
- In office January 27, 2011 – February 28, 2014
- President: Barack Obama
- Preceded by: Maura Connelly
- Succeeded by: Daniel Rubinstein (as Special Envoy)

13th United States Ambassador to Algeria
- In office May 30, 2006 – June 26, 2008
- President: George W. Bush
- Preceded by: Richard W. Erdman
- Succeeded by: David D. Pearce

Personal details
- Born: 1958 (age 67–68) Denver, Colorado, U.S.
- Spouse: Alison Barkley
- Education: Johns Hopkins University
- Profession: Diplomat, Career Ambassador

Robert Stephen Ford (born 1958) is a retired American diplomat who served as the United States Ambassador to Algeria from 2006 to 2008 and the United States Ambassador to Syria from 2011 to 2014.

== Personal life and education ==
Ford is from Denver, Colorado and now lives in Maryland. He earned a Bachelor of Arts in international studies and a Master of Arts in Middle East studies and economics from Johns Hopkins University. In addition, he pursued advanced Arabic studies at The American University in Cairo.

In addition to English, Ford speaks German, Turkish, French, and Arabic. A senior advisor to the Coalition Provisional Authority in Iraq described Ford as being "regarded as one of the best Arabists in the State Department".

Ford is married to Alison Barkley, who is a fellow diplomat.

== Career ==
=== Earlier career ===
A career member of the United States Foreign Service, he entered the service in 1985 and has been stationed in İzmir, Cairo, Algiers and Yaoundé.

Ford served as Deputy Chief of Mission in Bahrain from 2001 until 2004, and Political Counselor to the U.S. Embassy in Baghdad from 2004 until 2006.

=== Algeria ===
He was nominated for the position of U.S. Ambassador to Algeria by U.S. President George W. Bush on April 13, 2006. The nomination was sent to the U.S. Senate on April 24 and confirmed on May 27. Ford was sworn in on August 11. He served in the Algiers post until June 26, 2008.

=== Syria ===
In 2010, U. S. President Barack Obama nominated Ford as the first U.S. Ambassador to Syria in five years (pending U.S. Senate approval). In December 2010, after the U.S. Senate failed to act on the nomination, Obama used a recess appointment to secure Ford the position. The Senate then confirmed Ford by unanimous consent on October 3, 2011. During the Syrian revolution, he visited Hama, where he was cheered by protesters. He also met with an opposition figure, Hassan Abdul-Azim, in Damascus, and was attacked with eggs and tomatoes by government supporters.

On October 24, 2011, Ford was recalled from Syria; the U.S. State Department cited "credible threats" to his safety. Ford had attracted the ire of pro-Assad Syrians due to his strong support of the Syrian uprising. According to American officials, Ford had been attacked by an armed pro-government mob, and Syrian state television had begun running reports blaming him for the formation of death squads similar to those in Iraq. This led to fears that supporters of the Syrian government might try to kill him.

In August 2013, it was reported by The New York Times that U.S. Secretary of State John Kerry had recommended that Ford serve as the next U.S. Ambassador to Egypt, following the incumbent ambassador, Anne W. Patterson, being nominated to serve as the Assistant Secretary of State for Near Eastern Affairs – the head of the Bureau of Near Eastern Affairs within the U.S. Department of State, which oversees the Middle East.

On February 4, 2014, officials of the U.S. State Department said that Ford was retiring and on February 28 announced his departure. The U.S. States Department announced the appointment of Daniel Rubinstein as U.S. special envoy for Syria on March 14.

In December 2018, Ford declared his support for President Trump's decision to withdraw US troops from Syria, describing it as "essentially correct."

In May 2025, Ford said that he met Ahmed al-Sharaa during visits to Idlib that took place around 2023. He stated that the meetings were facilitated by a British research organization, which was working on initiatives related to governance and political transition in opposition-held areas. The Syrian presidency denied Ford's claims as "inaccurate", stating that any contact with al-Sharaa occurred only within broader delegation visits in Idlib.

== Later career ==
After retiring from government service, Ford was a resident of St. Johnsbury, Vermont, a senior fellow at the Middle East Institute, and a professor at Yale University's Jackson Institute for Global Affairs.

== Honors ==
Ford is a recipient of several Department of State awards, including the 2005 James Clement Dunn Award for Excellence for outstanding work at the mid-level in the Foreign Service as well as three Superior Honor Awards and two Meritorious Honor Awards.

In 2012, Ford was awarded the Profile in Courage Award by the John F. Kennedy Library Foundation for his work as the U.S. ambassador in Syria amidst "repeated threats to his life" where he was doing what was characterized as "traveling around Syria to encourage and support peaceful protesters targeted by Assad's brutal crackdown".

== See also ==
- List of people from Denver
- List of people from Maryland
- List of Johns Hopkins University people

Diplomatic posts
Preceded by Richard W. Erdman	U.S. Ambassador to Algeria; 2006–2008	Succeeded by David D. Pearce
Preceded by Margaret Scobey	U.S. Ambassador to Syria; 2011–2014	Succeeded by Daniel Rubinstein
