= Michael Ratney =

American diplomat (born 1961)

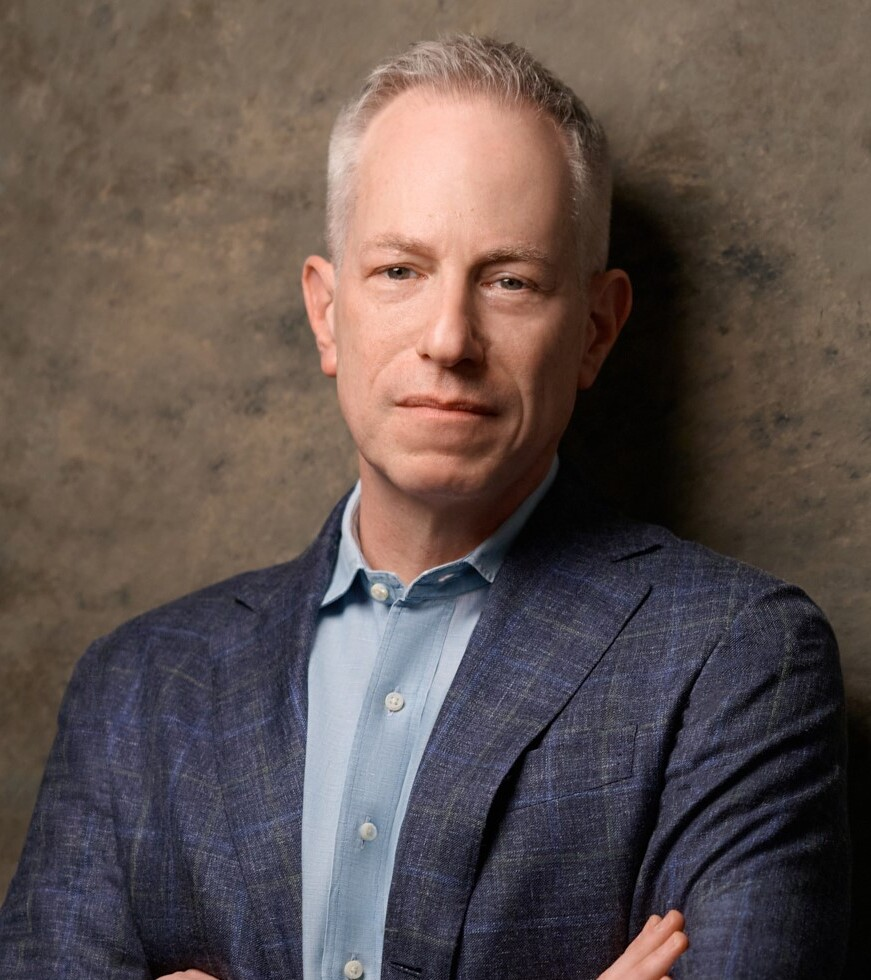
- Official portrait, 2023

United States Ambassador to Saudi Arabia
- In office April 27, 2023 – January 20, 2025
- President: Joe Biden
- Preceded by: John Abizaid
- Succeeded by: Alison Dilworth (Chargé d'affaires)

United States Special Envoy for Syria
- In office July 27, 2015 – January 20, 2017
- President: Barack Obama
- Preceded by: Daniel Rubinstein
- Succeeded by: Joel Rayburn

United States Consul General in Jerusalem
- In office July 27, 2012 – July 27, 2015
- Preceded by: Daniel Rubinstein
- Succeeded by: Donald Blome

Personal details
- Born: Michael Alan Ratney; 1961 (age 64–65)
- Spouse: Karen Sasahara
- Education: Boston University (BS); George Washington University (MA)
- Michael Ratney's voice Ratney's opening statement at his confirmation hearing to be United States ambassador to Saudi Arabia; Recorded June 16, 2022

Michael Alan Ratney (born 1961) is an American diplomat who was the United States ambassador to Saudi Arabia from April 2023 to January 2025. He previously served as the chargé d'affaires of the United States embassy in Israel. He is a non-resident senior adviser with the Center for Strategic and International Studies (CSIS).

== Early life and education ==
Raised in Massachusetts, Ratney is a 1979 graduate of Bedford High School. He has a bachelor of science in mass communication from Boston University and a master of arts in international affairs from the George Washington University.

== Career ==
Ratney is a career member of the Senior Foreign Service, with the rank of Minister-Counselor. He joined the service in 1990. Prior to his appointment as Ambassador, he served as the Acting Deputy Director of the U.S. Department of State's Foreign Service Institute. His most recent assignment before this was chargé d'affaires a.i. at the U.S. embassy in Jerusalem. Ratney served as the dean of the School of Language Studies at the Foreign Service Institute. He was previously on the National Defense University faculty. He served as the State Department's acting deputy assistant secretary for the Levant and Israel and Palestinian Affairs, and was the U.S. special envoy for Syria. Earlier, Ratney was the U.S. consul general in Jerusalem. He was the deputy assistant secretary for international media in the State Department's Bureau of Public Affairs. Prior to this, he served as a spokesman for the State Department's Bureau of Near Eastern Affairs. Other assignments include serving as deputy chief of mission at the U.S. embassy in Doha, Qatar, as well as tours in Mexico City, Baghdad, Beirut, Casablanca, Bridgetown, and Washington, D.C.

=== Nomination as U.S. ambassador to Saudi Arabia ===
On April 22, 2022, President Joe Biden announced his intent to nominate Ratney to be the next United States ambassador to Saudi Arabia. On April 25, 2022, his nomination was sent to the Senate. Hearings on his nomination were held before the Senate Foreign Relations Committee on June 16, 2022. The committee favorably reported his nomination to the Senate floor on June 23, 2022.

On September 28, 2022, Democratic Senator Ron Wyden placed a hold on Ratney's nomination due to a Saudi national killing Fallon Smart, a teenager from Wyden's home state of Oregon. The Saudi national responsible for Smart's death was reportedly aided by the Saudi government in fleeing the United States, and Wyden urged any ambassador to Saudi Arabia to make this a priority. His nomination expired at the end of the year and was returned to President Biden on January 3, 2023.

President Biden renominated Ratney the same day. The committee favorably reported the nomination to the Senate floor on March 8, 2023. Ratney was confirmed as U.S. Ambassador to Saudi Arabia by the Senate via voice vote on March 14, 2023.

He presented his credentials to the Saudi Ministry of Foreign Affairs on April 27, 2023.

== Awards and recognitions ==
Ratney has won multiple State Department performance awards, including a Presidential Meritorious Service award.

== Personal life ==
Ratney is married to fellow Foreign Service officer Karen Sasahara; she has served as the US ambassador to Kuwait since November 2023. Ratney speaks Arabic and French.

Diplomatic posts
| Preceded by Daniel Rubinstein | United States Consul General in Jerusalem; 2012–2015 | Succeeded by Donald A. Blome |
| Preceded by Daniel Rubinstein | United States Special Envoy for Syria; 2015–2017 | Succeeded by Joel Rayburn |
| Preceded by John Abizaid | United States Ambassador to Saudi Arabia; 2023–2025 | Vacant |
