= Joey R. Hood =

American diplomat

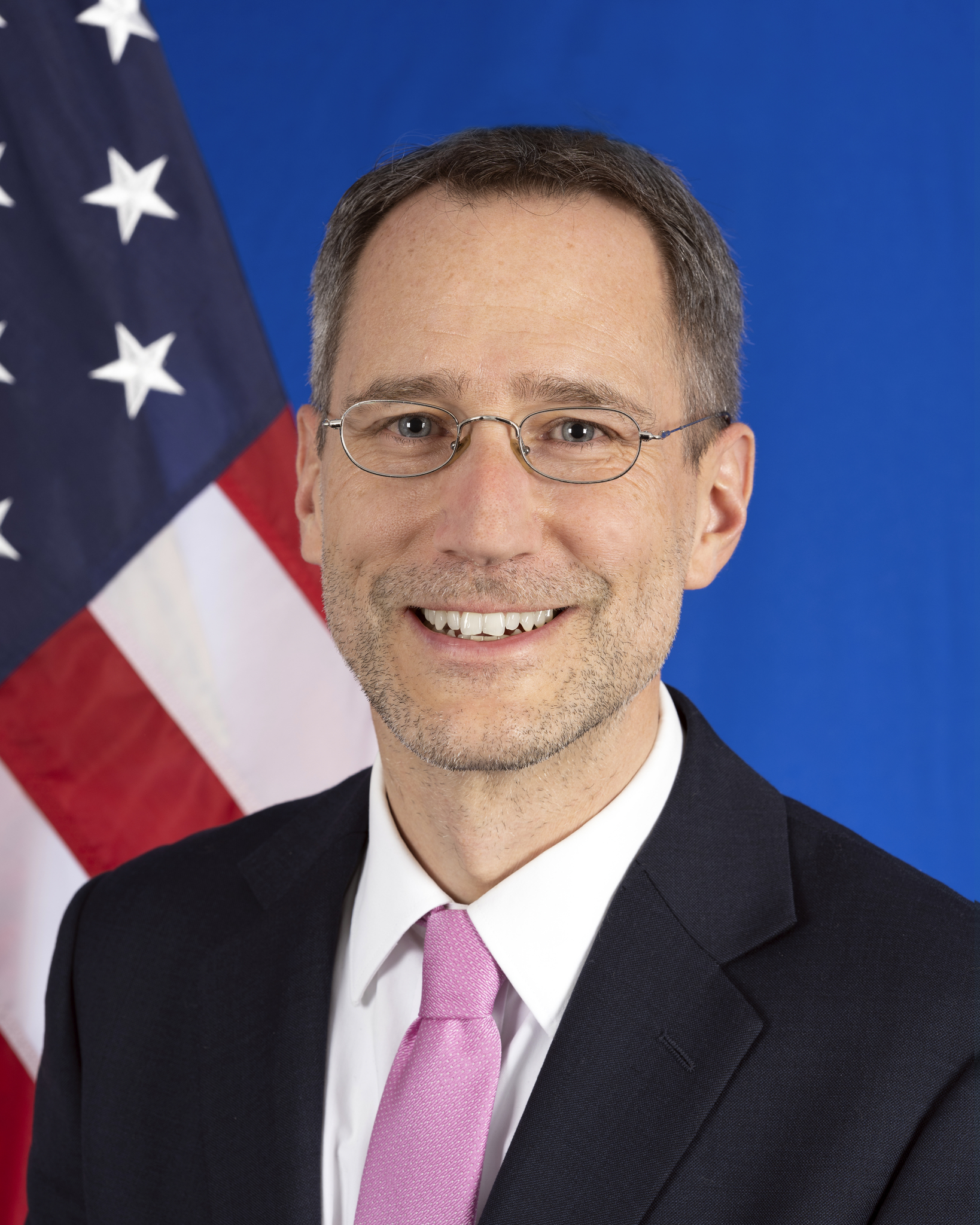

United States Ambassador to Tunisia
- In office February 2, 2023 – October 23, 2025
- President: Joe Biden; Donald Trump
- Preceded by: Donald Blome
- Succeeded by: Bill Bazzi

Personal details
- Education: Dartmouth College (BA); The Fletcher School at Tufts University (MA)

Joey R. Hood is an American diplomat who has served as the United States ambassador to Tunisia.

== Early life and education ==
Hood earned a Bachelor of Arts degree from Dartmouth College and a Master of Arts degree from The Fletcher School at Tufts University.

== Career ==
Prior to his career in foreign service, Hood was a Fulbright scholar in Burkina Faso, and worked at a bank in Vermont. He became a Pickering Fellow in 1998, being one of the first three to reach the rank of Senior Foreign Service. He is a career member of the Senior Foreign Service, class of Career Minister. Throughout his career, he served in leadership positions overseas as the Chargé d'affaires and deputy chief of mission of the U.S. Embassy in Baghdad, Iraq, the deputy chief of mission of the U.S. Embassy in Kuwait City, Kuwait, and the principal officer of the U.S. Consulate General in Dhahran, Saudi Arabia. In addition, he has served as the deputy director and the acting director of the Office of Iranian Affairs in the State Department's Bureau of Near Eastern Affairs, as the public affairs officer of the U.S. Embassy in Doha, Qatar, and as the political-economic section chief of the U.S. Embassy in Sanaa, Yemen. From January to September 2021, he served as Acting Assistant Secretary of State for Near East Affairs. Before and after that period, he was Principal Deputy Assistant Secretary of the Bureau.

=== U.S. ambassador to Tunisia ===
On May 20, 2022, President Joe Biden announced his intent to nominate Hood to be the next United States ambassador to Tunisia. On May 24, 2022, his nomination was sent to the Senate. Hearings on his nomination were held before the Senate Foreign Relations Committee on July 27, 2022. His nomination was favorably reported by the committee on December 7, 2022. The Senate confirmed Hood in a voice vote on December 21, 2022. He presented his credentials to President Kais Saied on February 2, 2023.

== Personal life ==
Hood speaks French and Arabic.

Diplomatic posts
Preceded by Donald Blome	United States Ambassador to Tunisia; 2023–2025	Succeeded by Bill Bazzi
