= David D. Pearce =

American diplomat

David Pearce
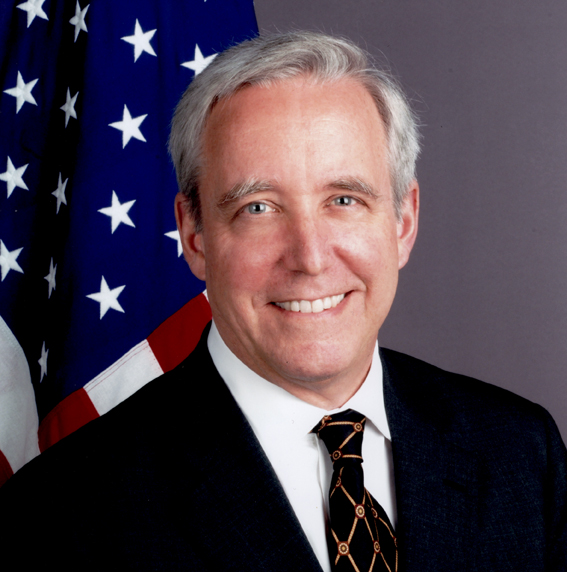

United States Ambassador to Greece
- In office October 17, 2013 – September 16, 2016
- President: Barack Obama
- Preceded by: Daniel Smith
- Succeeded by: Geoffrey Pyatt

14th United States Ambassador to Algeria
- In office September 2, 2008 – April 11, 2011
- President: George W. Bush; Barack Obama
- Preceded by: Robert Ford
- Succeeded by: Henry Ensher

United States Consul General in Jerusalem
- In office September 29, 2003 – July 20, 2005
- President: George W. Bush
- Preceded by: Jeff Feltman (Acting)
- Succeeded by: Jacob Walles

Personal details
- Born: June 9, 1950 (age 76) Portland, Maine, U.S.
- Education: Bowdoin College (BA); Ohio State University (MA)

David Duane Pearce (born June 9, 1950) is an American diplomat who served from 2013 to 2016 as the U.S. Ambassador to Greece. He also served as the United States Ambassador to Algeria, 2008–11 and as the U.S. Consul General in Jerusalem from 2003-2005. He was the Assistant Chief of Mission at the U.S. embassy in Kabul, Afghanistan from 2011-2012; and served as the Acting United States Special Representative for Afghanistan and Pakistan and as a Deputy Assistant Secretary of State for South Asia from 2012-2013.

== Career ==
Pearce graduated from Bowdoin College in 1972, and received an M.A. in journalism from Ohio State University in 1973. Prior to joining the U.S. Foreign Service in 1982, he was a reporter, editor and foreign correspondent for nearly a decade. From 1973-79, he worked for the Associated Press in Ohio, the Rome Daily American in Italy, and United Press International in Brussels, Lisbon, and Beirut. As a wire service reporter, he covered revolution in Lisbon, civil war in Beirut, and political and economic change in the Arab world. He then moved to the Washington Post, serving as a copy editor on both the foreign and metro desks. From 1980 to 1981 he was a writer-editor in the book service of the National Geographic Society. He traveled to Southeast China just as the country was beginning to open up to the outside world, and authored the concluding chapter of the 1982 NGS book Journey Into China.

Pearce entered the Foreign Service in January 1982, serving first as a vice consul and political officer in Riyadh. From 1984 to 1985, he was a watch officer in the State Department Operations Center, followed by a 1985-87 tour as a country desk officer for Greece. In 1987-88, he studied Arabic at the Foreign Service Institute field school in Tunis, then became chief of the political section at the U.S. Embassy in Kuwait. During the Gulf War, Pearce worked as a liaison officer with the Kuwaiti government-in-exile in Taif, Saudi Arabia and returned to Kuwait to help restore embassy operations after Operation Desert Storm. In mid-1991 he was posted to Washington to become a special assistant to the Under Secretary of State for Political Affairs.

On an Una Chapman Cox fellowship in 1992-93, he wrote a book on diplomacy and the media. Wary Partners: Diplomats and the Media was published by Congressional Quarterly in 1994. From 1994-97, he was Consul General in Dubai and from 1997-2001 he served as Deputy Chief of Mission at the U.S. Embassy in Damascus. From September 2001 to July 2003, he was Director of the Department of State’s Office of Northern Gulf Affairs, with responsibility for Iraq and Iran. In May–June 2003, Pearce served with the Coalition Provisional Authority in Baghdad. He was Chief of Mission and Consul General at the United States Consulate General in Jerusalem from September 29, 2003 through July 2005, and then Minister Counselor for Political Affairs at the United States Embassy in Rome from 2005-2008. While in Rome, he served two excursion tours to Iraq, in March–April 2007 and September 2007-March 2008, as a senior adviser to Ambassador Ryan Crocker.

President George W. Bush nominated him to become ambassador to Algeria on June 28, 2008, and he served there until 2011. He later became the Assistant Chief of Mission at the U.S. Embassy in Kabul, Afghanistan. After serving as the Senior Deputy, and then the Acting, United States Special Representative for Afghanistan and Pakistan, as well as a Deputy Assistant Secretary of State for South Asia, Pearce was nominated by President Obama to become Ambassador to Greece on 21 June 2013. He retired from the U.S. Foreign Service in November 2016, and is now a painter who also sells his work online via his company David D. Pearce Fine Art.

== Works ==
- Wary Partners: Diplomats and the Media, CQ-Roll Call Group Books, September 1995, ISBN 978-1-56802-067-9

Diplomatic posts
Preceded by Jeff Feltman; Acting	United States Consul General in Jerusalem; 2003–2005	Succeeded by Jacob Walles
Preceded by Robert Ford	United States Ambassador to Algeria; 2008–2011	Succeeded by Henry Ensher
Preceded by Daniel Smith	United States Ambassador to Greece; 2013–2016	Succeeded by Geoffrey Pyatt
