= Karen Sasahara =

American diplomat (born 1959)

Ambassador Karen Sasahara

United States Ambassador to Kuwait
- In office November 26, 2023 – July 9, 2025
- President: Joe Biden; Donald Trump
- Preceded by: Alina Romanowski

Chargé d'Affaires to Jordan
- In office March 14, 2019 – August 30, 2020
- President: Donald Trump
- Preceded by: Henry T. Wooster (Chargé d'Affaires)
- Succeeded by: Mike Hankey (Chargé d'Affaires)

United States Consul General in Jerusalem
- In office August 2018 – March 2019
- Preceded by: Donald Blome
- Succeeded by: Position terminated

Personal details
- Born: Karen Hideko Sasahara; 1959 (age 66–67)
- Spouse: Michael Ratney
- Education: University of Wisconsin-Milwaukee (BA); George Washington University (MA)

Karen Hideko Sasahara (born 1959) is an American diplomat who served as United States ambassador to Kuwait 2023–2025. She previously served as consul general in Jerusalem until the 2019 relocation of the US embassy in Israel, and subsequent closure of the consulate.

== Early life and education ==
Sasahara was born in Cambridge, Massachusetts and raised in the Boston area. She is the daughter of Dr. Arthur A. Sasahara.

Sasahara holds an MA in Near East studies from the George Washington University, and a BA in international relations from the University of Wisconsin–Milwaukee.

== Career ==
Sasahara is a member of the Senior Foreign Service, with the rank of Minister Counselor. As consul general, she was the point person for the State Department with the Palestinian Authority. Following the closure of the US Consul in Jerusalem, Sasahara's next post was as chargé d'affaires, a.i. at the U.S. embassy in Amman in March, 2019.

In 1989 she served as political and economic officer at the US consulate general in Jeddah, Saudi Arabia.

=== Ambassador Nomination to Kuwait ===
On August 19, 2022, President Joe Biden nominated Sasahara to be the next US Ambassador to Kuwait. On September 6, 2022, her nomination was sent to the Senate. Sasahara's nomination expired at the end of the year and was returned to President Biden on January 3, 2023.

President Biden renominated Sasahara the following day. Hearings on her nomination were held before the Senate Foreign Relations Committee on March 15, 2023. The committee reported her nomination favorably on April 27, 2023. Her nomination was confirmed by the full Senate via voice vote on October 16, 2023.

== Personal life ==
Sasahara is married to fellow diplomat Michael Ratney. She speaks Arabic, Spanish, French, and Russian.
