= Joseph Donaldson Jr. =

American artist (1914-1997)

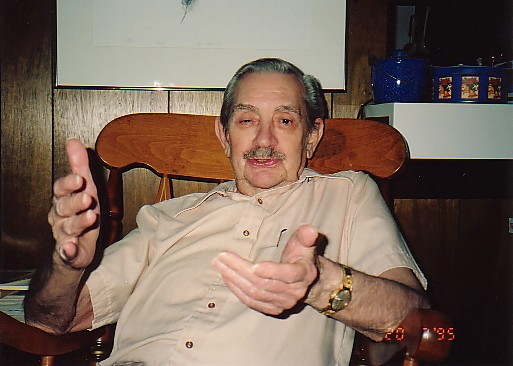
Joseph Donaldson, Jr. talking while sitting in his rocking chair at home on July 20, 1995

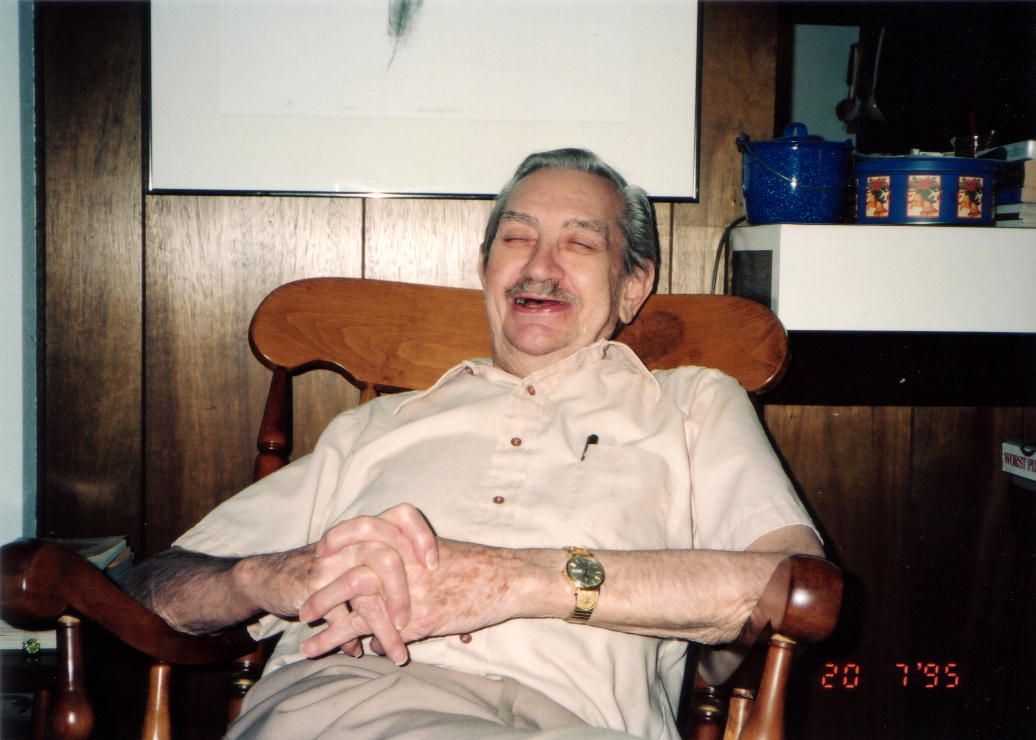
Joseph Donaldson, Jr. laughing while sitting in his rocking chair at home on July 20, 1995

Joseph Donaldson Jr. (January 30, 1914 - January 1, 1997) was an American artist and professor of art at a number of institutions, including Tulane University, The St. Thomas Art Center in the U.S. Virgin Islands, and finally in the college of architecture at Texas A&M University.

== Early life and education ==
Joseph (Joe) was born in New Orleans, Louisiana, on January 30, 1914. He studied at the Art Institute of Chicago.

== Career ==
Following a period of study at the Art Institute of Chicago, Donaldson found employment in his hometown of New Orleans as an artist with the WPA (Works Progress Administration) Federal Art Project, which had been created under President Roosevelt's New Deal. He also exhibited his work with the New Orleans Art League, which had been founded in the French Quarter in 1927.

Donaldson lived in New York City for a time in the 1940s before returning to New Orleans, and then on to the U.S. Virgin Islands and eventually to College Station, Texas, to take a position at Texas A&M University, although he also spent time producing artwork in Haiti, Scotland, Wales and England.

Donaldson's work was featured in Fort Times and in many other publications, and has been shown in numerous galleries. His works continue to be seen in art auctions.

== Personal life ==
Donaldson married four times yet had no children.

== See also ==
Find a Grave memorial for Joseph Donaldson, Jr.
