= National U.S.–Arab Chamber of Commerce =

The National U.S.–Arab Chamber of Commerce (NUSACC) is America’s #1 commercial gateway to the Middle East and North Africa (MENA) region. Currently celebrating its 50th anniversary, the Chamber is America’s longest serving organization dedicated to U.S. - Arab business. In 2024, our Chamber was privileged to receive the coveted E Star Award for Export Excellence, conferred by the President of the United States.

NUSACC is a non-partisan, non-profit organization that is registered under U.S. law as a 501-c-6 chamber of commerce. The Chamber is an independent, membership-driven entity that is funded by its member companies and stakeholders.

NUSACC is the only business entity in the United States that is officially recognized and authorized by the League of Arab States and the General Union of Arab Chambers of Commerce, Industry, and Agriculture.
