= Joel Rayburn =

Retired American Army officer

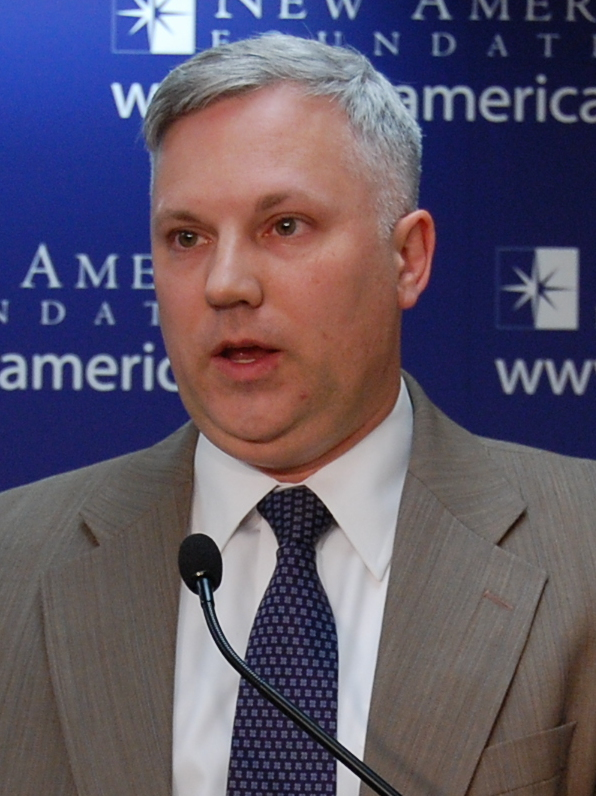
- Rayburn in 2014

United States Special Envoy for Syria
- In office July 23, 2018 – January 19, 2021
- President: Donald Trump
- Preceded by: Michael Ratney
- Succeeded by: Tom Barrack (2025)

Personal details
- Born: September 6, 1969 (age 57)
- Education: United States Military Academy (BA); Texas A&M University (MA); National War College (MA)
- Occupation: Diplomat, author, soldier

Military service
- Allegiance: United States
- Branch/service: United States Army
- Rank: Colonel

Joel Rayburn is a retired United States Army officer, former diplomat, and historian who served as the United States Special Envoy for Syria from 2018 to 2021. He has published books and articles about the American invasion of Iraq in 2003 and its results. From January to July 2021 he served as a special advisor for Middle East affairs to U.S. Senator Bill Hagerty (R-TN). He is currently a Senior Fellow at the Hudson Institute. In 2025, he was nominated by Donald Trump to be the Assistant Secretary of State for Near Eastern Affairs. The White House withdrew his nomination in October 2025.

== Biography ==
Joel Rayburn entered the United States Army in 1992 after graduating from the U.S. Military Academy at West Point. Commissioned into the field artillery, Rayburn served in Germany and Bosnia-Herzegovina before transferring to the military intelligence corps in 1996. From 2002 to 2005, he taught history at West Point. Between 2006 and 2011, Rayburn served multiple combat tours in Iraq and Afghanistan, including during the "surge" period of 2007-2008 in Iraq.

From 2010 to 2013, Rayburn was a frequent critic of Iraqi Prime Minister Nuri Maliki and of the Obama administration's decision to withdraw all U.S. forces from Iraq in December, 2011. In January, 2012 Rayburn wrote in an article published by the Hoover Institution that the U.S. withdrawal would result in a security vacuum in Iraq and a potential return to civil war. In 2012, Rayburn wrote that Nuri Maliki and his Da'wa Party allies were becoming a new authoritarian regime that was alienating Iraq's Sunnis and youthful protesters. In 2013, Rayburn warned that events in Iraq were leading the country back into civil war.

In 2014 Rayburn published a book titled Iraq After America: Strongmen, Sectarians, Resistance, telling the history of the conflict in Iraq from the Iraqi perspective. The book was published by the Hoover Institution. Chapter 5 of his book is frequently cited to support the assertion that the Faith Campaign of Saddam Hussein promoted Salafi ideology, and thus created a base for the rise in 2003 of the Islamic State of Iraq and the related insurgency. Chapter 6 of his book discusses the Kurdish nationalist movement and its purpose "to annex the strategic city of Kirkuk" and to reverse the demographic changes there which had been caused by the actions of the regime of Saddam Hussein.

From 2013 to January 2017, Rayburn directed a U.S. Army project to produce a history of the Iraq War. In that capacity, he was editor and co-author of the two-volume history, The U.S. Army in the Iraq War, which was published in January 2019.

From January 2017 to July 2018, he served as Senior Director for Iran, Iraq, Syria, and Lebanon on the U.S. National Security Council staff at the White House. In that position, he served as the White House's senior staff officer on a number of high-profile issues, such as the April, 2017 and April, 2018 U.S. airstrikes meant to deter the Syrian regime of Bashar al-Assad from continuing its use of chemical weapons against Syrian civilians. He also oversaw the development of the Trump administration's strategy concerning the Iranian regime, announced by President Trump in October 2017.

In July 2018 Rayburn was appointed to the position of Deputy Assistant Secretary for Levant Affairs, a position he held until November 2020. In addition, he was appointed in July 2018 as Special Envoy for Syria, a position he held until January 2021. As Special Envoy for Syria, Rayburn was responsible for implementing the United States' diplomatic strategy concerning Syria, including the implementation of sanctions against the Syrian regime of Bashar al-Assad under the Caesar Syria Civilian Protection Act of 2019 and other U.S. sanctions authorities. In December, 2020, Rayburn testified before the House Foreign Affairs Committee, where he advised members of Congress that the U.S. policy of pressuring the Assad regime through sanctions and political pressure had brought the United States' main objectives in Syria within reach, as long as the United States maintained the pressure. On April 18, 2023 Rayburn testified before the Subcommittee on the Middle East, North Africa, and Central Asia (Committee on Foreign Affairs) with others about alleged war crimes committed in the prosecution of the Syrian civil war.

Rayburn holds master's degrees in History from Texas A&M University (2002) and in strategic studies from the National War College (2013). He is originally from Oklahoma City, Oklahoma.
