= American International School of Algiers =

American International School of Algiers (AISA)

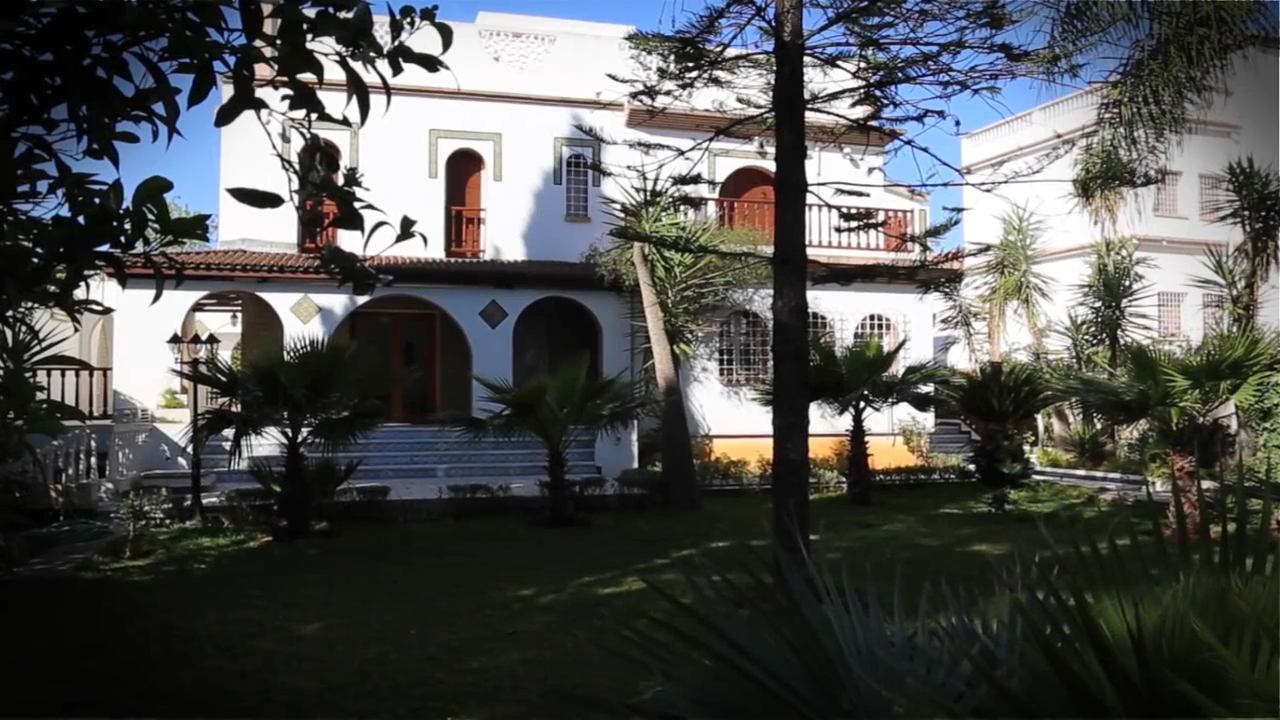

Location
- 5 bis Mackley Road, Ben Aknoun, 16030 Algiers; Algeria; 36.763170°N 3.020575°E

Information
- Type: Private
- Motto: Educating Lifelong Learners and Tomorrow's Global Citizens
- Established: December 29, 2015; 10 years ago
- Director: Sarah Putnam
- Faculty: 9
- Grades: K-8
- Gender: Coeducational
- Age range: 3 to 14
- Enrollment: 40 (March 2024)
- Language: English
- Hours in school day: 7 hours (6 hours in Thursdays)
- Color: Blue
- Mascot: Falcon
- Newspaper: Falcon Flash
- School fees: US$30,200 (2020-21)
- Website: aisalgiers.org

The American International School of Algiers (in Arabic: المدرسة الدولية الأمريكية بالجزائر; in Berber languages: Aɣerbaz Agreɣlan Amarikani n Dzayer), abbreviated as AISA, is a private, coeducational, international school based in Algiers, Algeria. It provides an academic program for English-speaking students from kindergarten to the seventh grade, taught by U.S. educators.

== History ==
Beginning in early 2004, Beatrice Cameron, Regional Education Officer of the U.S. Department of State's Office of Overseas Schools, began yearly visits to study the feasibility of opening an American School in Algeria. The U.S. Embassy also began negotiations with the Algerian government. During the second session of the U.S.–Algeria Strategic Dialogue in April 2014, Secretary of State John Kerry and Algerian Foreign Affairs Minister Ramtane Lamamra announced the intent to open an American International School in Algiers.

Nearly two years later, an agreement was signed in Washington, D.C., on December 29, 2015, by the Algerian Ambassador to the United States, Madjid Bouguerra, and Anne Patterson, U.S. Assistant Secretary of State for Near Eastern Affairs, representing both governments. The agreement was approved in March 2016.

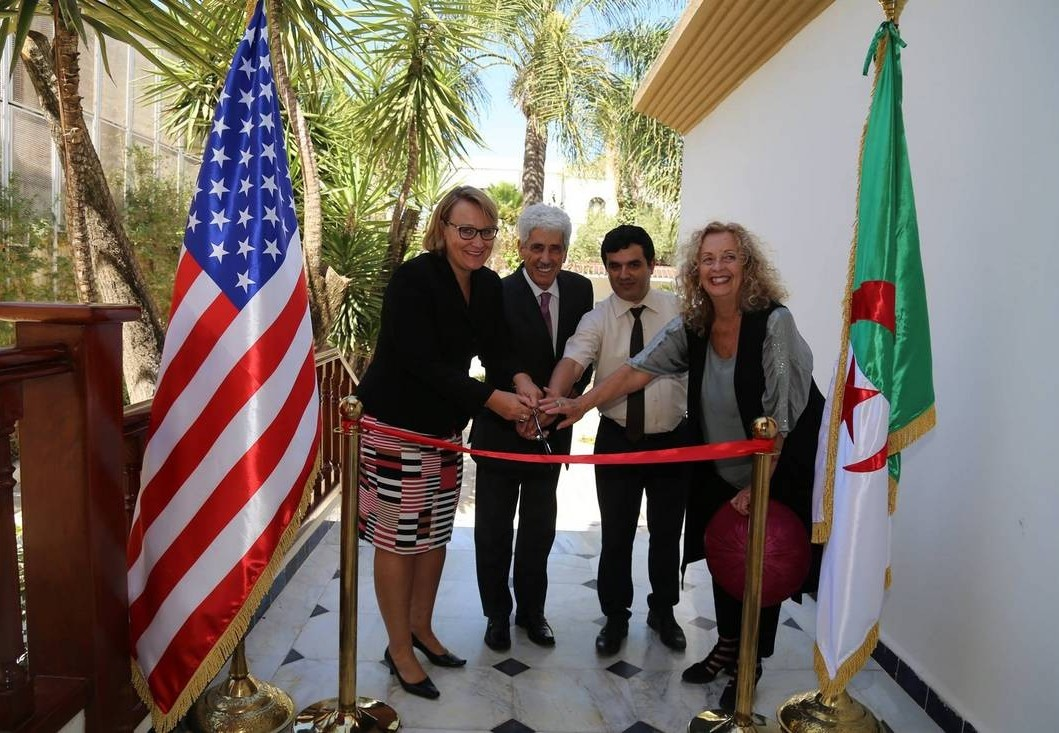
Inauguration of AISA.

On August 22, 2016, U.S. Ambassador to Algeria Joan Polaschik, Director General of Americas at the Algerian Ministry of Foreign Affairs Larbi Katti, Director of Legal Studies and Cooperation at the Algerian Ministry of National Education Boubaker Bouazza, and Director of AISA Judith Drotar led a ribbon-cutting ceremony to officially inaugurate the school. The following day, the school opened its doors to students for the very first time.

Significant contributions to AISA came from both the American School of Tripoli (Libya) and the American School of Tangier (Morocco), but the former had to close its doors in March 2011 as a result of the Libyan Civil War. However, the school's furniture and its entire library were saved and shipped to Tangier and stored at the American School until the contents could be shipped to Algiers in 2016.

AISA's logo was designed by American graphic artist Cole Williams. Representing the tree of knowledge, the olive tree was chosen because it is indigenous to the Mediterranean area and its branches represent peace in many cultures.

== Governance ==
AISA is governed by a board of trustees. Guided by an internal constitution and by-laws, the Trustees approve all programs, budgets, and other matters of significance including setting policy, leading fund raising campaigns, and assisting with public relations. The Trustees meet a minimum of four times yearly, including one open meeting for parents.

The Chairman of the Board is the Chief of Mission of the Embassy of the United States in Algeria and appoints the other four Trustees. A majority of the Board must be U.S. citizens. AISA's current Trustees are:

- U.S. Ambassador Elizabeth Aubin, Trustee Chairperson;
- Kristin Rockwood, Trustee Vice-chairperson;
- Jamari Roland, Trustee Secretary;
- Georges Assi, Trustee Treasurer;
- Ramz Hamzaoui, Finance & Fund Raising Committee.

The school also has a Director, a post that is held by Ariella Knight as of 2025 .

== Funding ==
AISA is a private school, and thus, is not funded by the Algerian nor the U.S. government. Given that all the costs the school incurs have to come from tuition, accepted students have to pay a registration fee of $200 plus a tuition of $30,000 as of 2023. This fee covers operating costs, including salaries, educational materials, books, equipment, and some extracurricular activities. The school is also authorized to receive funds from a nonprofit foundation called Friends of the American International School in Algeria, incorporated in Princeton, New Jersey as a 501(c)(3) organization.

== Campus ==
The school is located in a large multilevel villa in Mackley Road, Ben Aknoun, Algiers, which is a diplomatic community with several embassies and diplomatic residences located nearby. There is a front garden with play equipment and a back garden with benches, covered seating, and soccer nets. The campus gates open on weekdays (Sunday to Thursday) from 7:30 am to 4:00 pm.

The facility also includes a library, named The Bea Cameron Library, that is located on the top floor of the school's villa. It is the school's information center and is available for all students and their families. Students visit the library for story time and for book exchange weekly with their class. The core collection that has over 5,000 volumes comes from the former American School of Tripoli, along with the addition of more than 650 new titles ordered specifically for the school.

== Curriculum ==
AISA's program serves students from prekindergarten to the eighth grade. Supported by the U.S. Department of State's Office of Overseas Schools, AISA delivers an American curriculum based on the academic standards that have been developed by Project AERO (American Education Reaches Out), in order to facilitate an eventual move into American or other international English-speaking schools.

The school's program, which is taught by American teachers with support from an Algerian staff, is particularly providing students with the knowledge of different world cultures, including those of Algeria. Students take classes in art, library, ICT, music, physical education, and conversational French. The educational program also includes the teaching of the Arabic language, Algerian history, geography, and culture for Algerian students. The school excludes any theological teaching.

In the event of becoming a K-12 school in the future, the signed agreement between Algeria and the United States specifies that the diplomas issued and awarded by AISA shall be recognized by Algeria's Ministry of National Education.

== Students and admission ==
AISA is open for 5 to 13 years English-speaking students living in Algiers. In 2020–21, it had 27 students from 17 different nationalities enrolled, with the majority of them having previously attended English-speaking schools in other countries. As yet, the school doesn't offer additional ESL support and doesn't serve students with special educational needs due to its "lack of resources". Admission for all students is determined by the Admission Committee based on age, academic records, written examination, interview, and space availability.

== See also ==
- Education in Algeria
- Algeria–United States relations
