= Karl Eikenberry =

United States general and former ambassador to Afghanistan

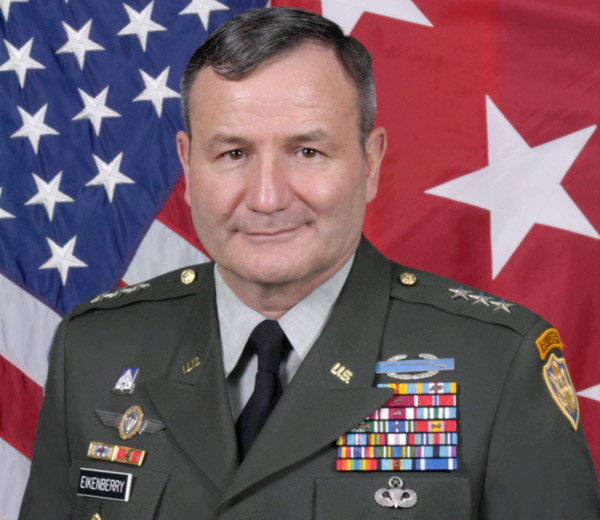

18th United States Ambassador to Afghanistan
- In office May 21, 2009 – July 19, 2011
- President: Barack Obama
- Preceded by: William Braucher Wood
- Succeeded by: Ryan Crocker

Personal details
- Born: Karl Winfrid Eikenberry; November 10, 1951 (age 74) Hammond, Indiana, U.S.
- Spouse: Ching Eikenberry
- Education: United States Military Academy (BS); Harvard University (MA); Stanford University (MA)

Military service
- Allegiance: United States
- Branch/service: United States Army
- Years of service: 1974–2009
- Rank: Lieutenant General
- Commands: Combined Forces–Afghanistan; Office of Military Cooperation–Afghanistan
- Battles/wars: War in Afghanistan

Karl Winfrid Eikenberry (born November 10, 1951) is an American diplomat and retired United States Army lieutenant general who served as the U.S. Ambassador to Afghanistan from April 2009 to July 2011. From 2011 to 2019, he was the director of the U.S. Asia Security Initiative at the Walter H. Shorenstein Asia-Pacific Research Center and a Stanford University professor of the practice; a member of the core faculty at the Center for International Security and Cooperation; and an affiliated faculty member at the Freeman Spogli Institute for International Studies, Center on Democracy, Development and the Rule of Law, and the Europe Center.

Born in Indiana, he graduated from the United States Military Academy in 1973. Eikenberry served as an Infantry officer, having command and staff roles in mechanized infantry, airborne, and ranger units. He also served as defense attaché in at the United States embassy in Beijing, and as the director of the strategic planning and policy directorate at United States Pacific Command. During the war in Afghanistan, he led the Office of Military Cooperation from 2002 to 2003, and later served as commander of the Combined Forces in Afghanistan from 2005 to 2007, before his retirement from the Army in 2009.

Eikenberry is a fellow of the American Academy of Arts and Sciences where he co-directs the academy's multiyear project on civil wars, violence, and international responses, and a member of the academy's Committee of International Security Studies. He serves on the board of the Asia Foundation, American Councils for International Education, the Asia Society of Northern California, Academic Exchange, and the National Committee on American Foreign Policy. He is a faculty member of Schwarzman College, Tsinghua University in Beijing, and a member of the Working Group on Science and Technology and U.S.-China Relations organized by the UC San Diego 21st Century China Center and the Asia Society's Center on U.S.-China Relations. Additionally, Eikenberry is a member of the Council on Foreign Relations, the American Academy of Diplomacy, and the International Institute for Strategic Studies.

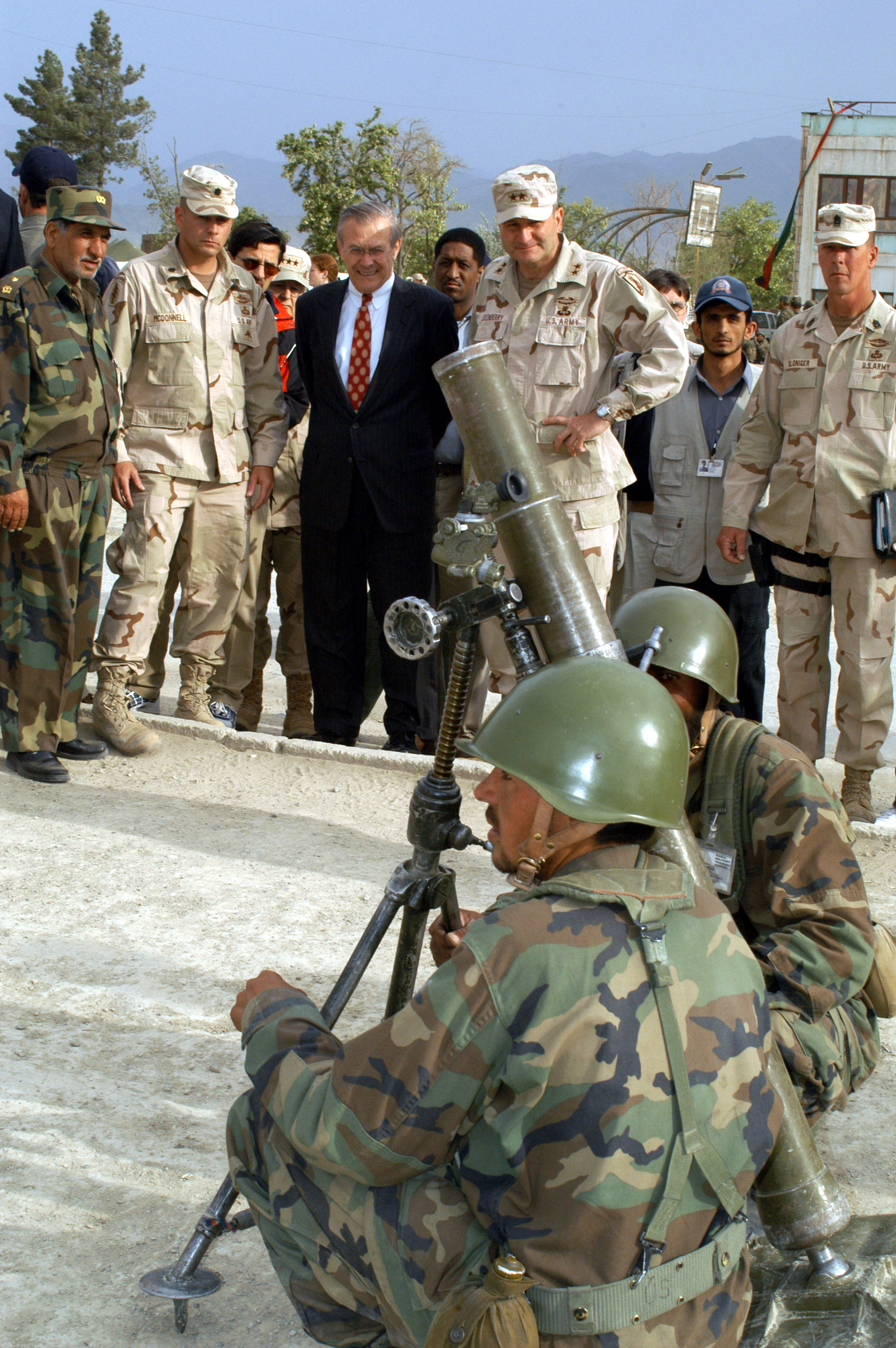
Eikenberry with Secretary of Defense Donald Rumsfeld at Afghan Army training center in May 2003.

== Early life and education ==
Karl Winfrid Eikenberry was born in 1951 in Hammond, Indiana and graduated from Goldsboro High School in Goldsboro, North Carolina, in 1969. He then attended the United States Military Academy at West Point, where he was commissioned as a second lieutenant upon graduation in 1973.

He received an MA in East Asian Studies from Harvard University, where he would later return as a national security fellow at the John F. Kennedy School of Government. He also earned an MA in political science from Stanford University. In addition, Eikenberry has studied in Hong Kong at the UK Ministry of Defence Chinese Language School, earning the British Foreign and Commonwealth Office's interpreter's certificate for Mandarin Chinese, and at Nanjing University, earning an advanced degree in Chinese history.

== Military career ==
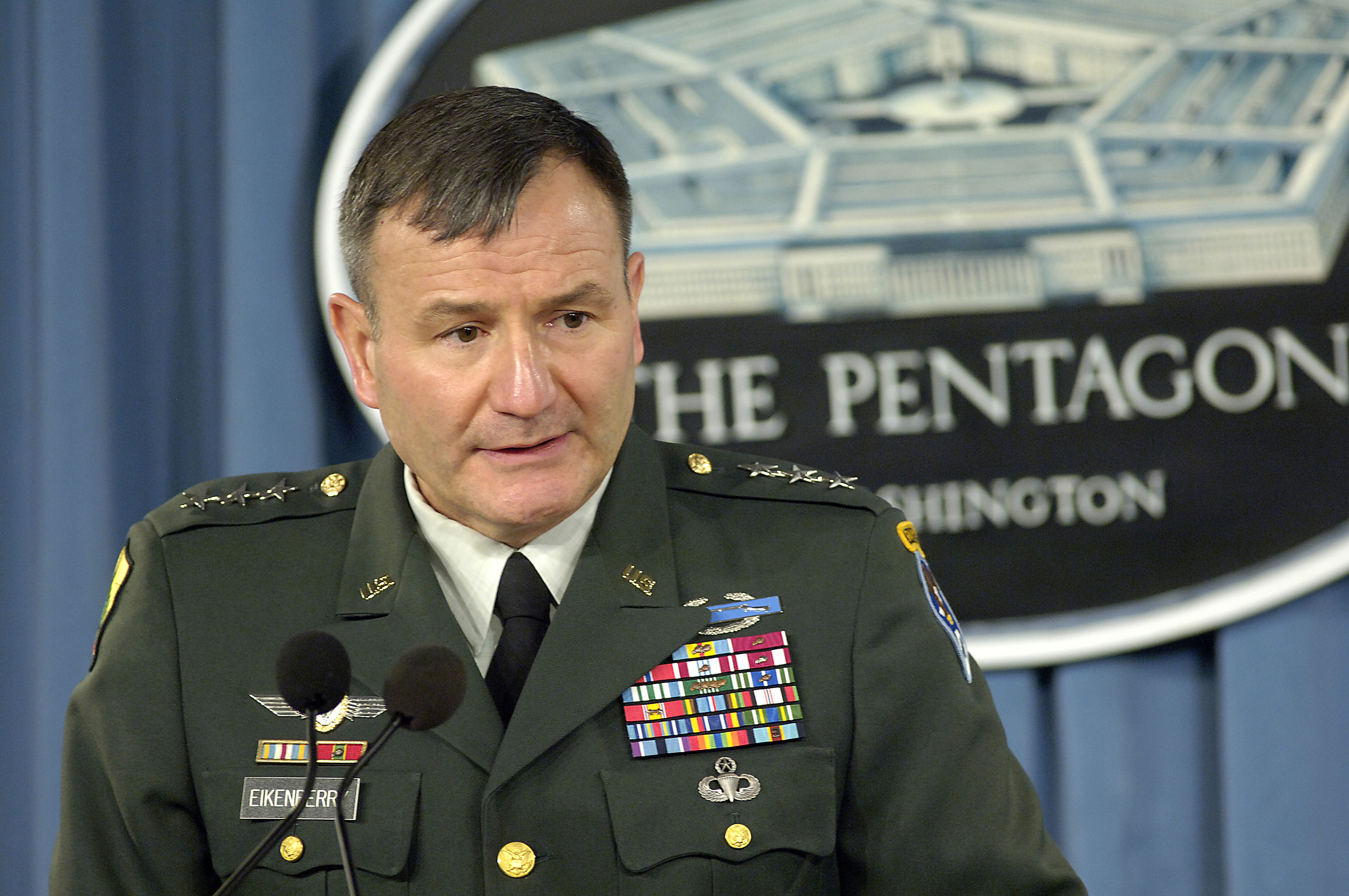
Eikenberry during a press conference at the Pentagon on December 8, 2005.

In the Army, Eikenberry commanded and held staff positions in airborne, ranger, and mechanized infantry units in the United States, Korea, and Europe. After being commissioned as an Infantry officer, he served in the 1st Battalion, 17th Infantry Regiment, from 1974 to 1975. Eikenberry then served at the headquarters of 2nd Battalion, 24th Infantry Regiment, until 1976, when he attended the Infantry School. In 1981, he obtained a master's degree from Harvard, at which point he went to study in Hong Kong. Eikenberry later served as a company commander in the 3rd Battalion, 19th Infantry Regiment, and graduated from Ranger School. He also served as assistant army attaché and later as the defense attaché at the United States embassy in Beijing, People's Republic of China. His other political-military assignments included senior country director for China and Taiwan in the Office of Secretary of Defense, Foreign Area Officer Division Chief and deputy director of the Strategy, Plans and Policy Directorate on the Army Staff, and Director of Strategic Planning and Policy Directorate, United States Pacific Command, Camp Smith, Hawaii. Eikenberry served two tours of duty in the war in Afghanistan.

His first tour in Afghanistan, from September 2002 to September 2003, he filled two positions—his primary duty was as the U.S. security coordinator for Afghanistan and the second position was the chief of the Office of Military Cooperation-Afghanistan (OMC-A). As the security coordinator, he worked closely with special representative of the UN Secretary-General for Afghanistan and Pakistan Lakhdar Brahimi to forge a unified international effort to build a cohesive security sector. Security sector reform (SSR) followed a lead-nation approach agreed upon in January 2002, in which the G8 nations would each lead a specific sector—the United States was responsible for the Afghan National Army; Germany, the Afghan Police; UK, counter-narcotics; Italy, judicial reform; and Japan and the United Nations took on the task of disarming, demobilizing, and reintegrating the militias.

Eikenberry succeeded Lieutenant General David Barno as commander, Combined Forces Command-Afghanistan, on May 4, 2005.

During his second tour from May 2005 to February 2007, he was responsible for transferring operational responsibility for southern and eastern Afghanistan to the NATO International Security Assistance Force and the international training of the Afghan National Army and Police Forces. He also commanded the military task force sent to Pakistan to provide humanitarian assistance and disaster relief in the wake of the October 8th, 2005 Kashmir earthquake. He completed his military career in Brussels, Belgium as the Deputy Chairman of the NATO Military Committee.

== U.S. ambassador to Afghanistan ==
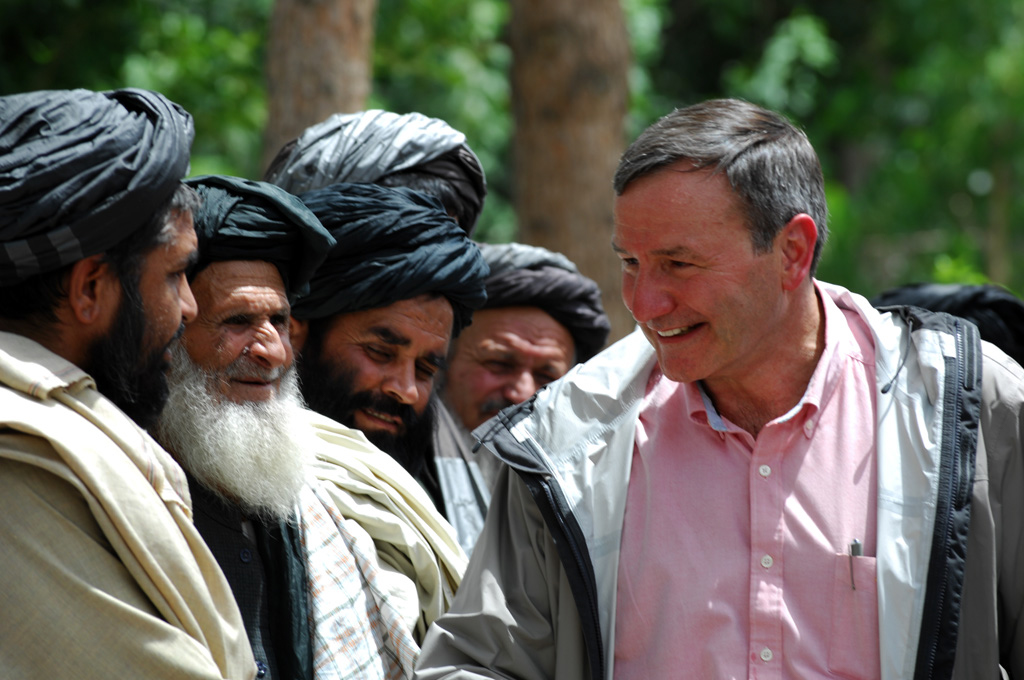
Visiting Afghan provincial elders as US ambassador in 2009

On January 29, 2009, The New York Times reported that President Barack Obama had chosen Eikenberry to be the next U.S. ambassador to Afghanistan, replacing William Braucher Wood. The choice of a career army officer for the sensitive post was described by The Times as "highly unusual." On April 3, 2009, the Senate confirmed Eikenberry's nomination, and on April 29, 2009, he was sworn in as the U.S. ambassador to Afghanistan. The official announcement of his nomination was made on March 11. Following his confirmation as ambassador, he retired from the U.S. military with the rank of lieutenant general on April 28, 2009. As ambassador, he led the civilian surge directed by President Obama, overseeing the growth of the embassy staff from 350 to 1,400 civilian personnel from eighteen United States government departments and agencies, and the administration of bilateral development assistance budget of over US$4 billion annually.

=== Leak of classified cables ===
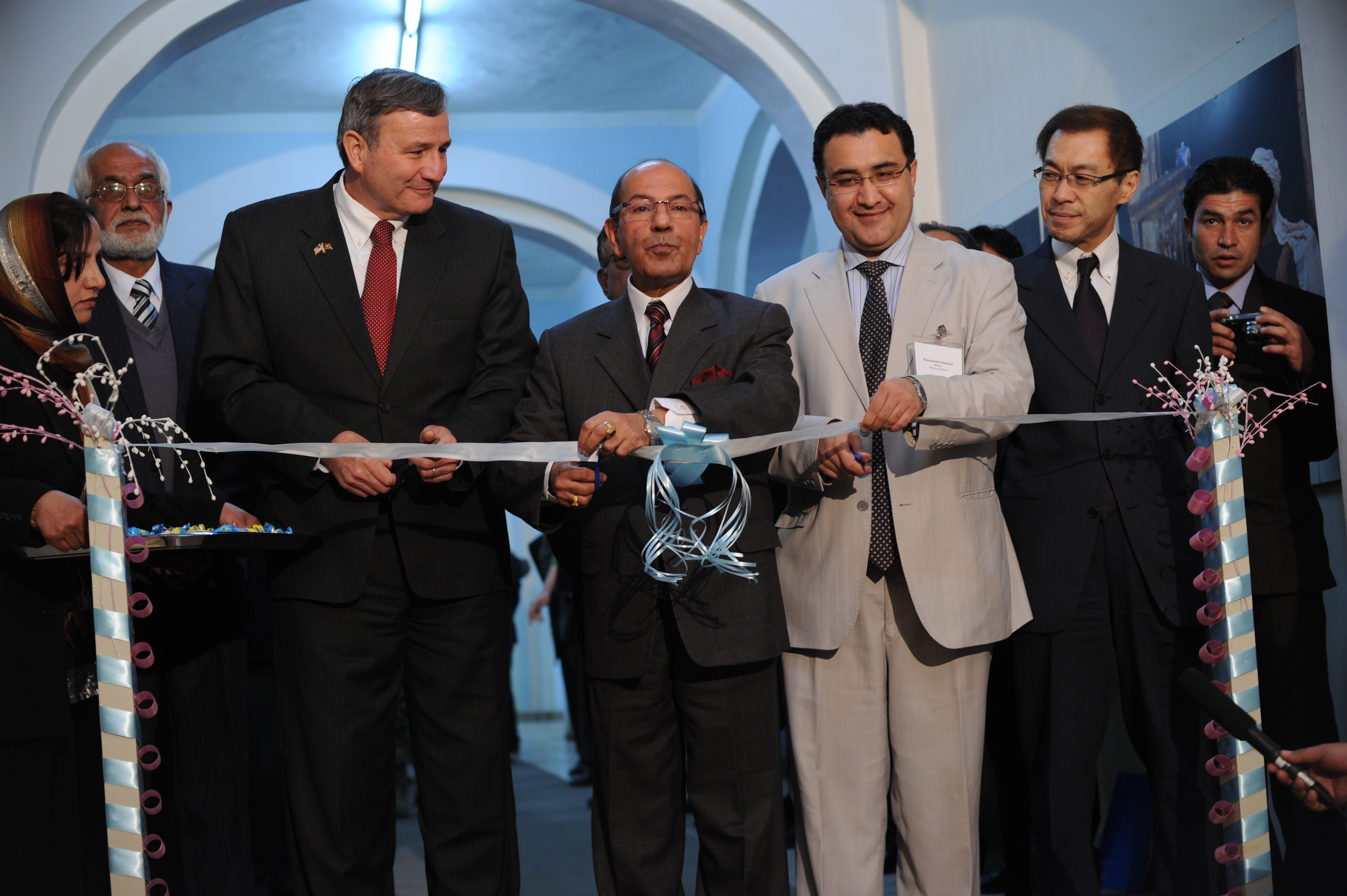
Ambassador Eikenberry with Afghan ministers at the Kabul Museum in March 2011.

In November 2009, Eikenberry sent two classified cables to his superiors in which he assessed the proposed U.S. strategy in Afghanistan. A description of the content of the cables was leaked soon after. In January 2010, The New York Times obtained and published the cables, which "show just how strongly the current ambassador feels about President Hamid Karzai and the Afghan government, the state of its military, and the chances that a troop buildup will actually hurt the war effort by making the Karzai government too dependent on the United States." In June 2010, General McChrystal was described in a Rolling Stone profile as feeling blindsided by Eikenberry's statements in the leaked cables. On the other hand, Eikenberry is described elsewhere as being frank and vocal about his concerns about the Karzai government as being an unreliable partner for the United States in its efforts in Afghanistan.

== Career at Stanford University ==
In September 2011 Eikenberry became the Payne Distinguished Lecturer at the Freeman Spogli Institute for International Studies at Stanford University and subsequently the William J. Perry Fellow in International Security at the Center for International Security and Cooperation. While at Stanford University, Eikenberry joined the faculty of the Ford Dorsey Program in International Policy Studies, served as a member of the American Academy of Arts and Sciences congressionally mandated Commission on the Humanities and Social Sciences, acted as a consultant for NATO and the RAND Corporation, and lectured and written on civil-military relations, U.S. Asia-Pacific strategy and Sino American relations, counter-insurgency and state-building strategies, and the contribution of the arts and humanities to America's international competitiveness. He was elected to be a member of the American Academy of Arts and Sciences in 2012.

== Writings ==
- Eikenberry, Karl W. (February 1988). "The Imjin War" (PDF). Military Review. 68 (2): 27–82.
- Eikenberry, Karl W. (1994). "The campaigns of Cao Cao". Military Review. 74 (8): 56–64.
- Eikenberry, Karl W. (February 1995). Explaining and Influencing Chinese Arms Transfers. McNair Papers. Washington, D.C.: Institute for National Strategic Studies, National Defense University. Archived from the original on 2009-01-09.
- Eikenberry, Karl W. (Summer 1996). "Take No Casualties". Parameters. 26 (2): 109–118. Archived from the original on June 9, 2007.
- Eikenberry, Karl W. (November 2009). "Ambassador Eikenberry's Cables on U.S. Strategy in Afghanistan". The New York Times.
- Eikenberry, Karl W. (May 2012). "Stop Ignoring Taiwan". Foreign Policy.
- Eikenberry, Karl W.; Hennessy, John L.; Sheehan, James J.; Kennedy, David M.; Perry, William J. (Spring 2012). "The Future of the American Military" (PDF). American Academy of Arts & Sciences: Bulletin. 65 (3).
- Eikenberry, Karl W. (January 2013). "The Militarization of US Foreign Policy" (PDF). American Foreign Policy Interests. 35: 1–8. doi:10.1080/10803920.2013.757952. S2CID 154672685.
- Eikenberry, Karl W.; Kennedy, David M. (May 26, 2013). "Americans and Their Military, Drifting Apart". The New York Times.
- Eikenberry, Karl W. (September 2013). "The Limits of Counterinsurgency Doctrine in Afghanistan". Foreign Affairs. 92 (5).
- Eikenberry, Karl W. (December 2013). "Reassessing The All-Volunteer Force". The Washington Quarterly. 36: 7–24. doi:10.1080/0163660x.2013.751647. S2CID 153668204.
- Eikenberry, Karl W. (June 2014). "The American Calculus of Military Intervention". Survival: Global Politics and Strategy. 56 (3) (3 ed.): 264–271. doi:10.1080/00396338.2014.920157. S2CID 154842453. Archived from the original on 2014-11-07.
- Fukuyama, Francis; Eikenberry, Karl W. (September 2014). "Friendless Obama needs Middle Eastern allies of convenience". Financial Times.
- Eikenberry, Karl W. (2014). "Thucydides Trap". American Review: Global Perspectives on America. Archived from the original on 2014-11-06.
- Eikenberry, Karl W. (June 2015). "China's Place in U.S. Foreign Policy". The American Interest. 10 (6).
- Eikenberry, Karl W. (Fall 2017). "Civil Wars and Global Disorder: Threats and Opportunities" (PDF). Daedalus. 146 (4). Archived from the original (PDF) on 2017-11-08.

== Awards and decorations ==
=== Personal decorations and badges ===
Eikenberry's personal decorations include:

U.S. military decorations
Defense Distinguished Service Medal (with 3 OLC)
Defense Superior Service Medal (with 2 OLC)
Legion of Merit (with OLC)
Bronze Star
Defense Meritorious Service Medal (with OLC)
Meritorious Service Medal (with 5 OLC)
Joint Service Commendation Medal
Army Commendation Medal (with 4 OLC)
Army Achievement Medal (with OLC)
U.S. unit awards
Joint Meritorious Unit Award (with 2 OLC)
Army Superior Unit Award (with OLC)
U.S. non-military decorations
State Department Distinguished Honor Award
State Department Superior Honor Award
State Department Meritorious Honor Award
Director of Central Intelligence Award
Chairman of the Joint Chiefs of Staff Joint Distinguished Civilian Service Award
U.S. service (campaign) medals and service and training ribbons
National Defense Service Medal (with 2 Service Stars)
Armed Forces Expeditionary Medal (with 2 Service Stars)
Afghanistan Campaign Medal
Global War on Terrorism Expeditionary Medal
Global War on Terrorism Service Medal
Korea Defense Service Medal
Humanitarian Service Medal
Army Service Ribbon
Army Overseas Service Ribbon (with bronze award numeral 4)

U.S. badges, patches and tabs
Combat Infantryman Badge
Expert Infantryman Badge
Master Parachutist Badge
Office of the Secretary of Defense Identification Badge
Army Staff Identification Badge
Ranger Tab
Combined Forces Command - Afghanistan Shoulder Sleeve Insignia (United States Army) – Former War Time Service (SSI-FWTS).
5 Overseas Service Bars

=== Non-U.S. service medals and ribbons ===
- NATO Medal for Former Yugoslavia

=== Foreign military and civil decorations ===
- Meritorious Service Cross (M.S.C.) Canada
- Cross of Merit of the Minister of Defence of the Czech Republic, First Class
- Alliance Medal (Hungary)
- French Officer Order of the Legion of Honor
- State Medal of Ghazi Amir Amanullah Khan (Afghanistan)
- State Medal of Ghazi Wazir Mohammad Akbar Khan (Afghanistan)

=== Foreign badges ===
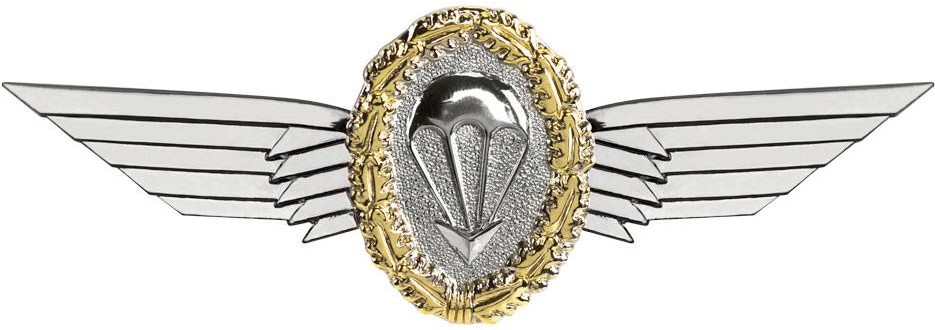
- German Parachutist Badge in silver (German: Fallschirmspringerabzeichen)

=== Academic Awards ===
Harvard Graduate School of Arts and Sciences Centennial Medal

Honorary Doctorate of Humane Letters Degree, North Carolina State University

Honorary Doctorate of Laws Degree, Ball State University

Honorary Doctorate of Humane Letters Degree, University of San Francisco

=== Other ===
George F. Kennan Award for Distinguished Public Service

State of North Carolina Order of the Long Leaf Pine Award

Goldsboro High School Athletic Hall of Fame

In August 2007 Eikenberry was given the key to the city of Goldsboro, North Carolina by the mayor.

In November 2018, Eikenberry was the Keynote Speaker at the Stanford Model United Nations Conference.

Military offices
Preceded by David Barno	Commander, Combined Forces Command - Afghanistan; 2005–2007	Succeeded by David D. McKiernan
Diplomatic posts
Preceded by William Braucher Wood	U.S. Ambassador to Afghanistan; 2009–2011	Succeeded by Ryan Crocker
