= John Desrocher =

American diplomat (born 1964)

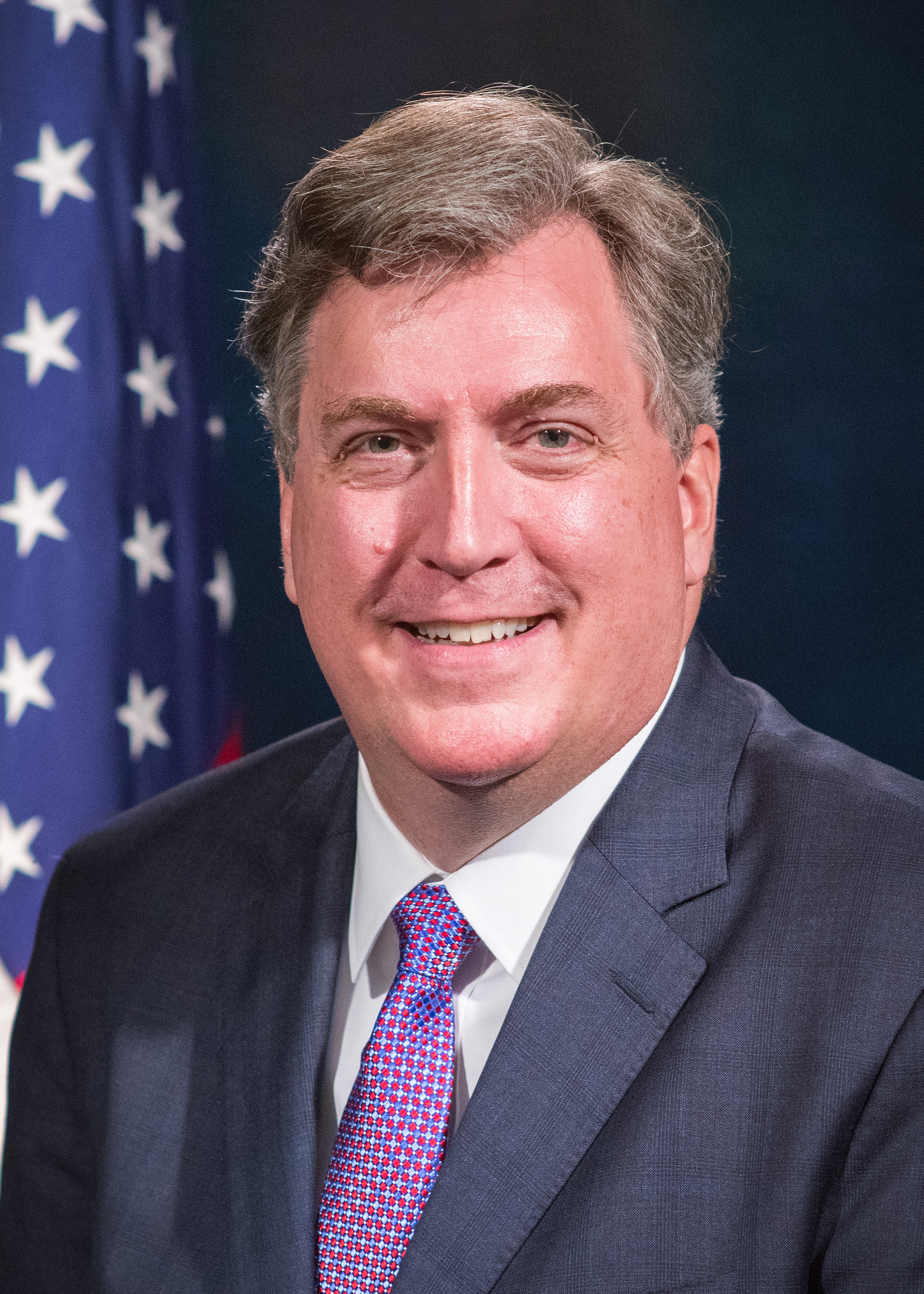

17th United States Ambassador to Algeria
- In office September 5, 2017 – January 20, 2021
- President: Donald Trump
- Preceded by: Joan A. Polaschik
- Succeeded by: Elizabeth Moore Aubin

Personal details
- Born: October 14, 1964 (age 62) Plattsburgh, New York
- Spouse: Karen Rose
- Education: Georgetown University

John Paul Desrocher (born October 14, 1964) is an American diplomat who served as the United States Ambassador to Algeria from 2017 to 2021. He is a career member of the Senior Foreign Service who has served as an American diplomat since 1988.

Desrocher is a graduate of the Edmund A. Walsh School of Foreign Service at Georgetown University.

Desrocher is a former deputy chief of mission and consul general at seven U.S. overseas missions. He served as Counselor for Economic and Political Affairs at the U.S. Embassy in Cairo, and then, from 2006 and 2009, he was the U.S. Consul General in Auckland, New Zealand. In 2009 and 2010, he was the Minister Counselor for Economic Coordination in Baghdad, Iraq. He then served as Deputy Chief of Mission at the U.S. Embassy in Baghdad.

From 2014 to 2017, he served as Deputy Assistant Secretary for Egypt and Maghreb Affairs in the Bureau of Near Eastern Affairs at the United States Department of State.

John Desrocher appointed as Charge d'Affaires ad interim at the US Embassy in Cairo on April 26, 2023.

== Personal life ==
Desrocher speaks French, German, and basic Arabic.

Diplomatic posts
| Preceded by Joan Polaschik | United States Ambassador to Algeria; 2017–2021 | Succeeded by Elizabeth Moore Aubin |
