= Henry S. Ensher =

American diplomat

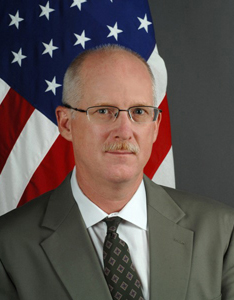

15th United States Ambassador to Algeria
- In office August 10, 2011 – September 3, 2014
- President: Barack Obama
- Preceded by: David D. Pearce
- Succeeded by: Joan A. Polaschik

Personal details
- Born: 1959 (age 66–67)
- Education: Loyola Marymount University (BA)

Henry S. Ensher (born 1959) is an American Career Foreign Service Officer who had served as Ambassador Extraordinary and Plenipotentiary to Algeria from 2011 until 2014. He's also served as deputy assistant secretary at the State Department's Bureau of South and Central Asian Affairs. As Deputy Assistant Secretary for Central Asia and Afghanistan at the U.S. Department of State, Ensher oversaw U.S. policy towards and diplomatic relations with the five Central Asian states and Afghanistan.

Ensher received his B.A. from Loyola Marymount University.
