= John Thomas McCarthy =

American diplomat

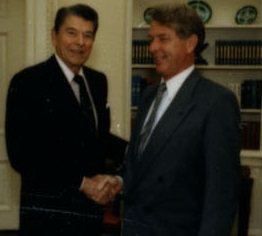
- McCarthy (right) with Ronald Reagan in 1988

Personal details
- Born: December 27, 1939 New York City, New York, U.S.
- Died: {
- Education: Manhattan College; Harvard University

John Thomas McCarthy (born December 27, 1939) was the United States Ambassador to Lebanon and Tunisia.

McCarthy holds degrees from Manhattan College and Harvard University. He joined the Foreign Service in 1962. Prior to his appointment as ambassador, he was Deputy Assistant Secretary of State for Public Affairs.

Diplomatic posts
| Preceded by John Hubert Kelly | United States Ambassador to Lebanon; 1988–1990 | Succeeded by Ryan Crocker |
| Preceded by Robert Pelletreau | United States Ambassador to Tunisia; 1991–1994 | Succeeded by Mary Ann Casey |
