= William Braucher Wood =

American ambassador (born 1950)

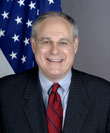

17th United States Ambassador to Afghanistan
- In office April 16, 2007 – April 9, 2009
- President: George W. Bush; Barack Obama
- Preceded by: Ronald E. Neumann
- Succeeded by: Karl Eikenberry

United States Ambassador to Colombia
- In office 2003–2007
- President: George W. Bush
- Preceded by: Anne Woods Patterson
- Succeeded by: William Brownfield

Personal details
- Born: August 7, 1950 (age 76) Fort Wayne, Indiana, U.S.
- Profession: Diplomat, Career Minister

William Braucher Wood (born August 7, 1950) is the U.S. envoy for international sanctions implementation at the Department of State. He is a former ambassador from the United States of America to the Islamic Republic of Afghanistan and Colombia.

Wood presented his credentials on April 16, 2007, to the president of Afghanistan, Hamid Karzai, and was received as the U.S. ambassador to that nation, replacing the former US ambassador to Afghanistan, Ronald E. Neumann. Ambassador Wood was the US ambassador to Colombia from 2003 to 2007, the principal deputy assistant secretary of state and acting assistant secretary of state in the Bureau of International Organization Affairs, with responsibility for all aspects of U.S. foreign policy at the United Nations and a number of other multilateral organizations from 1998 to 2002. Immediately before that assignment, Wood was political counselor at the U.S. Mission to the United Nations, where he was the chief U.S. negotiator in the Security Council.

== Career ==
Wood has been a professional foreign service officer for more than 25 years. He has served abroad in Uruguay, Argentina, El Salvador, Italy, as part of the U.S. negotiating delegation at the 1992 CSCE Helsinki Summit, and as lead U.S. negotiator at the NATO High Level Task Force on conventional arms control. In Washington, he has served on the policy planning staff for Latin America, as a special assistant in the Bureau of Political-Military Affairs, as an expert in Latin American affairs on the staff of the Under Secretary for Political Affairs, and on a number of functional and regional desks. His other areas of expertise include multilateral affairs, peacekeeping operations, conventional arms control, economic development, and politico-military affairs.

Wood has received the Department of State's meritorious and superior honor awards on repeated occasions. In 1998 he received the James Clement Dunn Award for Excellence for his work at the U.S. Mission to the United Nations. In 2002, he received the Distinguished Service Award, the highest award offered by the Department of State.

== Life ==
After graduating from Regis High School in New York City in 1968, Wood received a Bachelor of Arts degree in philosophy from Bucknell University in 1973 and a Master of Business Administration degree, with a specialization in international finance, from the George Washington University in 1975.

Diplomatic posts
Preceded by Anne Woods Patterson	U.S. Ambassador to Colombia; 2003–2007	Succeeded by William Brownfield
Preceded by Ronald E. Neumann	U.S. Ambassador to Afghanistan; 2007 – 2009	Succeeded by Karl Eikenberry
