= Richard Bordeaux Parker =

American diplomat (1923–2011)

3rd United States Ambassador to Algeria
- In office January 17, 1975 – February 12, 1977
- President: Gerald Ford; Jimmy Carter
- Preceded by: John D. Jernegan
- Succeeded by: Ulric St. Clair Haynes, Jr.

United States Ambassador to Lebanon
- In office 1977–1978
- President: Jimmy Carter
- Preceded by: Francis E. Meloy, Jr.
- Succeeded by: John Gunther Dean

United States Ambassador to Morocco
- In office 1978–1979
- President: Jimmy Carter
- Preceded by: Robert Anderson
- Succeeded by: Angier Biddle Duke

Personal details
- Born: July 3, 1923 Fort Stotsenburg, Philippines
- Died: January 7, 2011 (aged 87) Washington, D.C., U.S.
- Spouse: Jeanne Jaccard Parker
- Profession: Diplomat, Career Ambassador

Military service
- Allegiance: United States
- Branch/service: United States Army
- Years of service: 1943–1945
- Rank: 1st Lieutenant
- Unit: 106th Infantry Division
- Battles/wars: World War II • Battle of the Bulge

Richard Bordeaux Parker (July 3, 1923 – January 7, 2011) was an American diplomat, a Foreign Service Officer, and an expert on the Middle East. Parker served as Ambassador to Algeria, Lebanon and Morocco.

He was the brother of U.S. Army officer David Stuart Parker.

== Early life ==
Parker was the son of Col. Roscoe Parker, a U.S. Army officer (Cavalry), and grew up in U.S. Army posts across the southwest with a stint in Vermont and another in Kansas. He attended Kansas State University, but left in 1943 to join the U.S. Army during World War II. Parker served as an infantry officer with the 106th Infantry Division (first platoon of the Anti-Tank Company of the 422nd Infantry Regiment), where he was captured by the Germans at the Battle of the Bulge and briefly imprisoned. Captured at the same time as Parker, was Donald Prell, who commanded the second platoon of the Anti-Tank Company. After the war, Parker returned to Kansas State, where he completed his B.S. degree in 1947 and then earned an M.S. degree in 1948, before joining the U.S. Foreign Service in 1949.

== Diplomatic career ==
Parker served as deputy chief of mission in Rabat, Morocco from 1970 to 1974. He was ambassador to Algeria from 1975 to 1977, to Lebanon in 1977, and finally to Morocco from 1978 to 1979. He retired from the U.S. Foreign Service in 1981 and became the editor of The Middle East Journal. In addition to his diplomatic career, Parker taught at the University of Virginia, Johns Hopkins University, and Lawrence University. He also served as the first president of the Association for Diplomatic Studies and Training from 1986 to 1989.

In 1982, Parker participated in a study group held at the Council on Foreign Relations where he discussed current problems in North Africa. After these meetings Parker spent two years compiling and writing North Africa: Regional Tensions and Strategic Concerns. His book was published in relation with and through the Council on Foreign Relations.

In June 2004, Parker received the American Foreign Service Association's lifetime Contributions to American Diplomacy award. He died at a nursing home in Washington, D.C., in January 2011. The ashes of Parker and his wife Jeanne were interred at Arlington National Cemetery in February 2011.

== Service chronology ==
Richard Parker's Diplomatic Chronology
Position	Host country or organization	Year
US Foreign Service		1949 to 1958
US Foreign Service	Washington, D.C.	1958 to 1961
US Foreign Service	Beirut, Lebanon	1961 to 1964
US Foreign Service (Master's degree)	Princeton, New Jersey	1964 to 1965
US Foreign Service	Cairo, Egypt	1965 to 1967
US Foreign Service	Washington, D.C.	1967 to 1970
US Foreign Service (Deputy Chief of Mission)	Rabat, Morocco	1970 to 1974
U.S. Ambassador	Algiers, Algeria	1974 to 1977
U.S. Ambassador	Beirut, Lebanon	1977 to 1978
U.S. Ambassador	Rabat, Morocco	1978 to 1979

== Papers ==
Ambassador Parker's papers are held at Georgetown University, in Washington, D.C.

Some of Richard Bordeaux Parker's photographs are held at the Freer Gallery and Arthur M. Sackler Gallery Archives in Washington, D.C. The collection includes black and white negatives of Islamic architecture throughout Algeria, Cairo, Lebanon, Syria, Jordan, Morocco, and Spain.

== Published books ==
- A Practical Guide to Islamic Monuments in Cairo, (ISBN 977-424-036-7, 1974) This guide has been kept up to date by Caroline Williams. The 1985 version is available at the Internet Archive Islamic Monuments in Cairo a Practical Guide
- A Practical Guide to Islamic Monuments in Morocco, 1981 This is available at the Internet Archive A Practical Guide to Islamic Monuments in Morocco
- North Africa: Regional Tensions and Strategic Concerns, (ISBN 0-275-92773-3, 1987) (revised and updated version)
- The Politics of Miscalculation in the Middle East, (ISBN 0-2532-0781-9, 1993)
- The Six-Day War: A Retrospective, (ISBN 0-8130-1383-6, 1996)
- The October War, (ISBN 0-8130-1853-6, 2001)
- Uncle Sam in Barbary: A Diplomatic History, (ISBN 0-8130-2696-2, 2004)
- Memoirs of a Foreign Service Arabist, (ISBN 978-0-9886376-6-5, 2013)

== Obituaries and Biographies ==
Renaissance Man

Washington Post

Middle East Institute

Diplomatic posts
Preceded by John D. Jernegan (Diplomatic ties severed in 1967)	United States Ambassador to Algeria; January 1975 – February 1977	Succeeded by Ulric St. Clair Haynes, Jr.
Preceded by Francis E. Meloy, Jr.	United States Ambassador to Lebanon; February, 1977 – October 1978	Succeeded by John Gunther Dean
Preceded by Robert Anderson	United States Ambassador to Morocco; October 1978 – June 1979	Succeeded by Angier Biddle Duke
