= Ulric Haynes (diplomat) =

American diplomat (1931–2020)

Ulric St. Clair Haynes Jr.

4th United States Ambassador to Algeria
- In office July 13, 1977 – January 28, 1981
- President: Jimmy Carter; Ronald Reagan
- Preceded by: Richard Bordeaux Parker
- Succeeded by: Michael H. Newlin

Personal details
- Born: June 8, 1931 Brooklyn, New York, U.S.
- Died: August 21, 2020 (aged 89)
- Party: Democratic Party
- Spouse: Yolande Toussaint
- Children: 2
- Education: Amherst College; Yale Law School
- Profession: Diplomat, professor

Ulric St. Clair Haynes Jr. (June 8, 1931 – August 21, 2020) was an American diplomat, lawyer, and university professor. He served as the U.S. Ambassador to Algeria from 1977 to 1981, and a member of the American Academy of Diplomacy, Council of American Ambassadors and Council on Foreign Relations.

== Biography ==
Haynes, the son of Barbadian immigrants to the United States, was one of the first two black campers to be invited to attend Camp Rising Sun, an international, full-scholarship summer camp in 1947.

Haynes graduated from Amherst College in 1952, from Yale Law School in 1956, and attended the Harvard Business Schools six-week Advanced Management Program.

== Public service and business career ==
Haynes served with the New York State Department of Commerce, the United States Department of State from 1956 to 1959.

He was on the staff of the National Security Council and served as an administrative officer with the United Nations European Office in Geneva in 1965 and 1966.

From 1960 to 1962, Haynes was assistant to the representative for West Africa of the Ford Foundation in Lagos, Nigeria. Following that, he was assistant to the Foundation's representative for North Africa in Tunis, Tunisia, from 1962 to 1963. From there, he went to work at the State Department, where he was assistant officer in charge of Moroccan affairs from 1963 to 1964. In 1964 and 1965, Haynes became the officer in charge of High Commission Territories and South West Africa. From 1965 to 1966, he served on the staff of the National Security Council at the White House, specializing in African affairs.

From 1966 to 1970, Haynes was the president of Management Formation, Inc. From 1972 to 1974, he was a vice president at Cummins Engine Company. He was appointed to be the American ambassador to Algeria by President Jimmy Carter on April 27, 1977, and served from 1977 to 1981. He was one of the negotiators during the Iran hostage crisis at American embassy in Iran.

Haynes was a partner at Spencer Stuart and Associates and He has also served on the boards of directors of the ABC Broadcasting Companies, Rohm & Haas, HSBC Bank USA, ING Reliastar Insurance Company of NY, INNCOM, and Pall Corporation.

== Academia ==
Haynes was a visiting lecturer at the Harvard Business School from 1968 to 1972. He has also lectured at Stanford Business School. He was the president of the State University of New York College at Old Westbury. He was dean of the Frank G. Zarb School of Business and the executive dean of university international relations at Hofstra University from 1996 till his retirement in 2003. He is an adjunct professor of international relations at Rollins College and the University of Central Florida. Haynes says that "contact with students" is what he likes most about teaching.

He holds honorary doctorates from Indiana University, Butler University, John Jay College, Fisk University, Alabama State University, Mercy College, and Amherst College.

Haynes is also a member of the American Academy of Diplomacy.

== Personal life and death ==
Haynes was married to the former Yolande Toussaint and had two children.

He died from COVID-19 on August 21, 2020, at the age of 89.

Diplomatic posts
Preceded by Richard Bordeaux Parker	United States Ambassador to Algeria; 1977–1981	Succeeded by Michael H. Newlin
