= Cameron R. Hume =

American diplomat

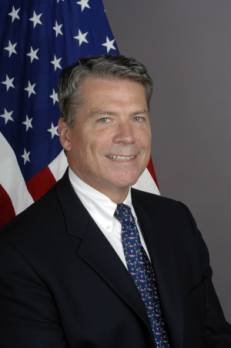

United States Ambassador to Indonesia
- In office August 1, 2007 – August 7, 2010
- President: George W. Bush; Barack Obama
- Preceded by: B. Lynn Pascoe
- Succeeded by: Scot Marciel

United States Ambassador to Sudan (Acting)
- In office October 2005 – June 2007
- President: George W. Bush
- Preceded by: John Limbert (Acting)
- Succeeded by: Alberto Fernandez (Acting)

Inspector General of the Department of State (Acting)
- In office August 23, 2004 – May 2, 2005
- President: George W. Bush
- Preceded by: John E. Lange (Acting)
- Succeeded by: Howard Krongard

United States Ambassador to South Africa
- In office November 29, 2001 – July 28, 2004
- President: George W. Bush
- Preceded by: Delano Lewis
- Succeeded by: Jendayi Frazer

10th United States Ambassador to Algeria
- In office December 28, 1997 – September 13, 2000
- President: Bill Clinton
- Preceded by: Ronald E. Neumann
- Succeeded by: Janet A. Sanderson

Personal details
- Education: Princeton University (BA); American University (JD)

Cameron R. Hume is a career diplomat who has served as United States Ambassador to Algeria (1997-2000), South Africa (2001-2004), and Indonesia (2007–2010).

== Career ==
Hume is a member of the United States Foreign Service, rank of Career Minister. His earlier assignments included Italy, Tunisia, Syria, Lebanon, the United Nations, and the Holy See.

More recently he has served as Ambassador to Algeria and to South Africa, and as Chargé d'Affaires to Sudan. While Ambassador to Indonesia, he focused on oceans, climate change, and education as elements of "soft power" diplomacy.

He has published three books (The United Nations, Iran and Iraq: How Peacemaking Changed (1994), Ending Mozambique's War (1994) and Mission to Algiers: Diplomacy by Engagement (2006)) and numerous articles on foreign policy. He has also been a fellow or guest scholar at the Council on Foreign Relations, Harvard University's Center for International Affairs, and the United States Institute of Peace. He is a lawyer and admitted to practice in New York and the District of Columbia.

His foreign languages include Arabic, French, and Italian.

Since leaving his post as ambassador in 2010, Hume has served as a consultant to various interests in Indonesia, including the Sinar Mas Group. From October 2014 to July 2022, he served a member of NOAA’s Ocean Exploration Advisory Board. He is currently Chairman of the American Indonesian Chamber of Commerce and Advisor to The Richardson Center. In April 2024, Hume was appointed as the Executive Director of Maritime Humanitarian Aid Foundation (MHAF).

Diplomatic posts
Preceded by Ronald E. Neumann	United States Ambassador to Algeria; 1997–2000	Succeeded by Janet A. Sanderson
Preceded by Delano Lewis	United States Ambassador to South Africa; 2001–2004	Succeeded by Jendayi Frazer
Preceded by John Limbert; Acting	United States Ambassador to Sudan; Acting; 2005–2007	Succeeded by Alberto Fernandez; Acting
Preceded by B. Lynn Pascoe	United States Ambassador to Indonesia; 2007–2010	Succeeded by Scot Marciel
