= Mary Ann Casey =

American diplomat (born 1949)

United States Ambassador to Tunisia
- In office July 5, 1994 – July 18, 1997
- President: Bill Clinton
- Preceded by: John T. McCarthy
- Succeeded by: Robin Lynn Raphel

8th United States Ambassador to Algeria
- In office July 2, 1991 – October 19, 1994
- President: George H. W. Bush; Bill Clinton
- Preceded by: Christopher W.S. Ross
- Succeeded by: Ronald E. Neumann

Personal details
- Born: November 11, 1949 (age 76) Boulder, Colorado, U.S.
- Profession: Diplomat, Career Ambassador

Mary Ann Casey (born November 11, 1949) is an American retired diplomat who was a career Foreign Service Officer and U.S. Ambassador to Algeria (1991–1994) and Tunisia (1994–1997).

== Life and career ==
Casey was born in Boulder, Colorado on November 11, 1949. She graduated with a degree in international relations from the University of Colorado at Boulder in 1970, and spent most of her overseas career in northern Africa. Her first assignment was as vice consul and political officer at the U.S. Embassy in Morocco; her most recent overseas position was Ambassador to Tunisia. In between, she spent time as a Watch Officer in the State Department Operations Center, desk officer for Iraq, as a Hoover Institution National Fellow at Stanford, as Deputy Assistant Secretary of State for Intelligence and Research, and as the Ambassador to Algeria.

Upon returning from Tunisia, Ambassador Casey became the State Department's "Diplomat in Residence" at the University of Colorado at Boulder, where she helped establish the Smith Hall International Program, chaired the International Affairs committee of the university's Conference on World Affairs, and taught several courses on international relations.

Her foreign languages include Arabic and French.

== Notes and references ==
Diplomatic posts
| Preceded by Christopher W.S. Ross | U.S. Ambassador to Algeria; 1991–1994 | Succeeded by Ronald E. Neumann |
| Preceded by John T. McCarthy | U.S. Ambassador to Tunisia; 1994–1997 | Succeeded by Robin Raphel |
