= L. Craig Johnstone =

American diplomat (born 1942)

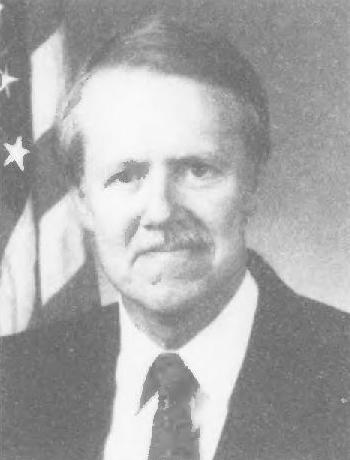

6th United States Ambassador to Algeria
- In office September 9, 1985 – July 10, 1988
- President: Ronald Reagan
- Preceded by: Michael H. Newlin
- Succeeded by: Christopher W.S. Ross

Personal details
- Born: September 1, 1942 (age 83) Seattle, Washington, U.S.
- Party: Democrat
- Spouse: Silke Johnstone l
- Profession: Diplomat, Ambassador

L. Craig Johnstone (born September 1, 1942) is an American former diplomat who served as the U.N. Deputy High Commissioner for Refugees.

== Education ==
Johnstone earned his bachelor's degree in 1964 from the University of Maryland, and completed his graduate studies at Harvard University in 1971.

== Career ==
Johnstone served in Vietnam from 1965 to 1970. A Vietnamese linguist by training, he worked first with the U.S. Agency for International Development, and then with the U.S. State Department. Upon returning to the United States, he became a Fellow with the Council on Foreign Relations, and then with the Institute of Politics at Harvard University. He went back to Vietnam in 1975 on a rescue mission for Vietnamese citizens who had assisted the United States, and then continued his refugee work as part of a team assisting in the resettlement of Vietnamese refugees. He then worked on the Egypt-Israel negotiations for the return of the Sinai to Egypt.

Johnstone was posted to the U.S. Embassy in Canada, Jamaica, and Paris as the U.S. Vietnam negotiator. He was a State Department coordinator with the UN General Assembly, and also served as deputy assistant secretary of state for Latin America. From 1985 to 1988, he was United States Ambassador to Algeria.

He worked for Cabot Corporation in Brussels between 1989 and 1994, and then returned to government to serve as director for resources, plans and policy in the Office of the Secretary of State from 1994 to 1999. He was then a senior vice president for the U.S. Chamber of Commerce, and later left to become the European vice president and general manager for Boeing. In 2007, Johnstone was named UN Deputy High Commissioner for Refugees.

Johnstone is a member of the American Academy of Diplomacy, and a board member of Refugees International, and Vital Voices Global Partnership.

== Notes ==
Diplomatic posts
Preceded by Michael H. Newlin	United States Ambassador to Algeria; 1985–1988	Succeeded by Christopher W.S. Ross
