= Ronald E. Neumann =

American diplomat (born 1944)

Ronald Eldredge Neumann
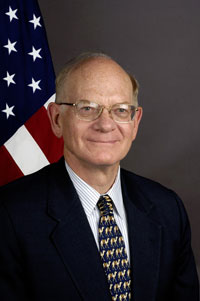

16th United States Ambassador to Afghanistan
- In office June 27, 2005 – April 10, 2007
- President: George W. Bush
- Preceded by: Zalmay Khalilzad
- Succeeded by: William Braucher Wood

United States Ambassador to Bahrain
- In office September 17, 2001 – June 7, 2004
- President: George W. Bush
- Preceded by: Johnny Young
- Succeeded by: William T. Monroe

9th United States Ambassador to Algeria
- In office July 5, 1994 – September 19, 1997
- President: Bill Clinton
- Preceded by: Mary Ann Casey
- Succeeded by: Cameron R. Hume

Personal details
- Born: September 30, 1944 (age 81) Washington D.C., U.S.
- Parent: Robert G. Neumann (father)
- Profession: Diplomat, Career Ambassador

Ronald Eldredge Neumann (born September 30, 1944) is an American diplomat who served as the United States ambassador to Afghanistan (2005–2007), Bahrain (2001–2004) and Algeria (1994–1997). He is the son of former ambassador Robert G. Neumann and traveled extensively after college in Afghanistan while his father was ambassador there. Only one other father-and-son pair, John Adams and his son, John Quincy Adams, have served as ambassadors to the same country; both Adamses served as ministers to Britain. He pronounces his last name Newmann (without the Germanic neu) and his name is sometimes seen spelled that way.

== Career ==
After college, Neumann served as a U.S. Army infantry officer in the Vietnam War. Neumann joined the United States Department of State as a Foreign Service Officer in 1970. His first posting was in Senegal, but in 1973 he served in Tabriz, Iran, and thereafter specialized in the Middle East, and Persian Gulf in particular. He also served in the United Arab Emirates. In 1991, while he was Director of the Iran Iraq office (Director of Northern Gulf Affairs), Neumann was involved in overseeing Kurdish refugees in the Middle East.

In 1994, he was appointed ambassador to Algeria, in part because of his Middle East experience, and served in that capacity until 1997. He subsequently was made deputy assistant secretary of state for Near Eastern Affairs.

In 2000, he was selected to become ambassador to Bahrain, but the Senate did not confirm him immediately and during the delay he was found to be involved in a minor security scandal involving the mishandling of classified materials. He was ultimately cleared of wrongdoing and newly elected President George W. Bush approved his appointment in 2001.

Neumann was ambassador to Bahrain when the embassy there was closed temporarily due to attacks in April 2002 from pro-Palestinian protestors. No one was hurt in the protest, although buildings were damaged and vehicles were set on fire.

In 2004, he left Bahrain to serve as a United States political advisor in Iraq and served in that position until he was made ambassador to Afghanistan in 2005. He was sworn in on July 27, 2005, and presented his credentials to Afghan President Hamid Karzai on August 1, 2005. He retained that post until 2007.

Neumann currently serves as the president of the American Academy of Diplomacy, a Washington, D.C.–based think tank.

In 2009, he authored The Other War: Winning and Losing in Afghanistan, a book exploring political and military issues of Afghanistan.

In 2018, he was presented the Lifetime Contributions to American Diplomacy Award by the American Foreign Service Association.

Neumann is an Advisory Board Member of Spirit of America, a 501(c)(3) organization that supports the safety and success of Americans serving abroad and the local people and partners they seek to help.

Neumann speaks Arabic, French, and some Persian.

Diplomatic posts
Preceded by Mary Ann Casey	United States Ambassador to Algeria; 1994–1997	Succeeded by Cameron R. Hume
Preceded by Johnny Young	United States Ambassador to Bahrain; 2001–2004	Succeeded by William T. Monroe
Preceded by Zalmay Khalilzad	United States Ambassador to Afghanistan; 2005–2007	Succeeded by William Braucher Wood
