= Christopher W. S. Ross =

American diplomat

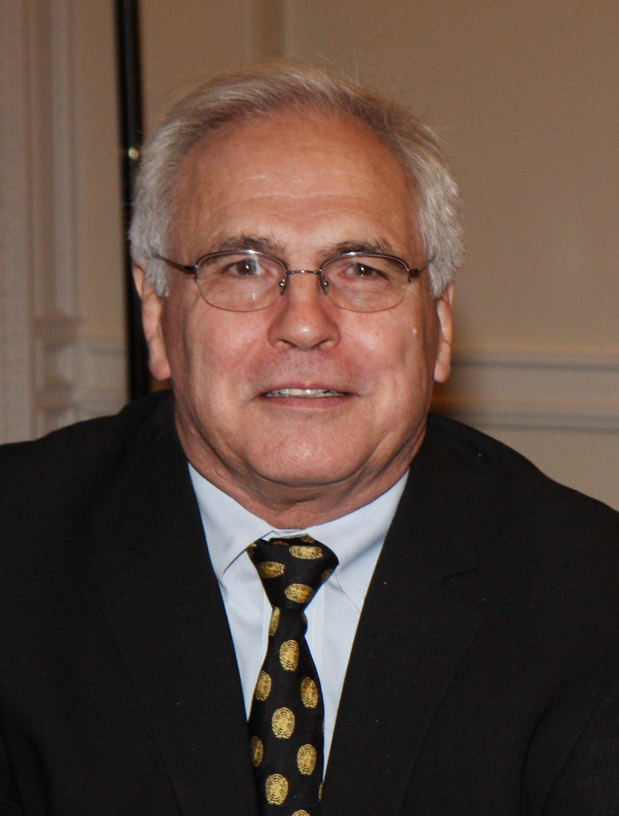
- Ross in 2011

7th United States Ambassador to Algeria
- In office August 12, 1988 – August 14, 1991
- Preceded by: L. Craig Johnstone
- Succeeded by: Mary Ann Casey

United States Ambassador to Syria
- In office August 2, 1991 – March 22, 1998
- Preceded by: Edward Djerejian
- Succeeded by: Ryan Crocker

10th Coordinator for Counterterrorism
- In office March 30, 1998 – December 13, 1998
- Preceded by: Philip C. Wilcox Jr.
- Succeeded by: Michael A. Sheehan

Personal details
- Born: March 3, 1943 (age 82); Quito, Ecuador
- Profession: Diplomat, Career Ambassador

Christopher W. S. Ross (born October 4, 1943) is an Ecuadorian-born American former diplomat who served as United States Ambassador to Algeria and Syria. On January 7, 2009, he was appointed as the UN envoy to Western Sahara. He resigned in March 2017.

He was until recently a special adviser for the Middle East and North Africa at the U.S. mission to the United Nations. His father was Ambassador Claude Gordon "Tony" Ross. In 2003 he was the US State Department Senior Adviser for Arab World Public Diplomacy.

== Notes and references ==
Diplomatic posts
| Preceded by L. Craig Johnstone | U.S. Ambassador to Algeria; 1988–1991 | Succeeded by Mary Ann Casey |
| Preceded by Edward Peter Djerejian | U.S. Ambassador to Syria; 1991–1998 | Succeeded by Ryan Clark Crocker |
