= Ben Aknoun =

Coordinates: 36°45′N 3°00′E

Ben Aknoun بن عكنون
- Commune
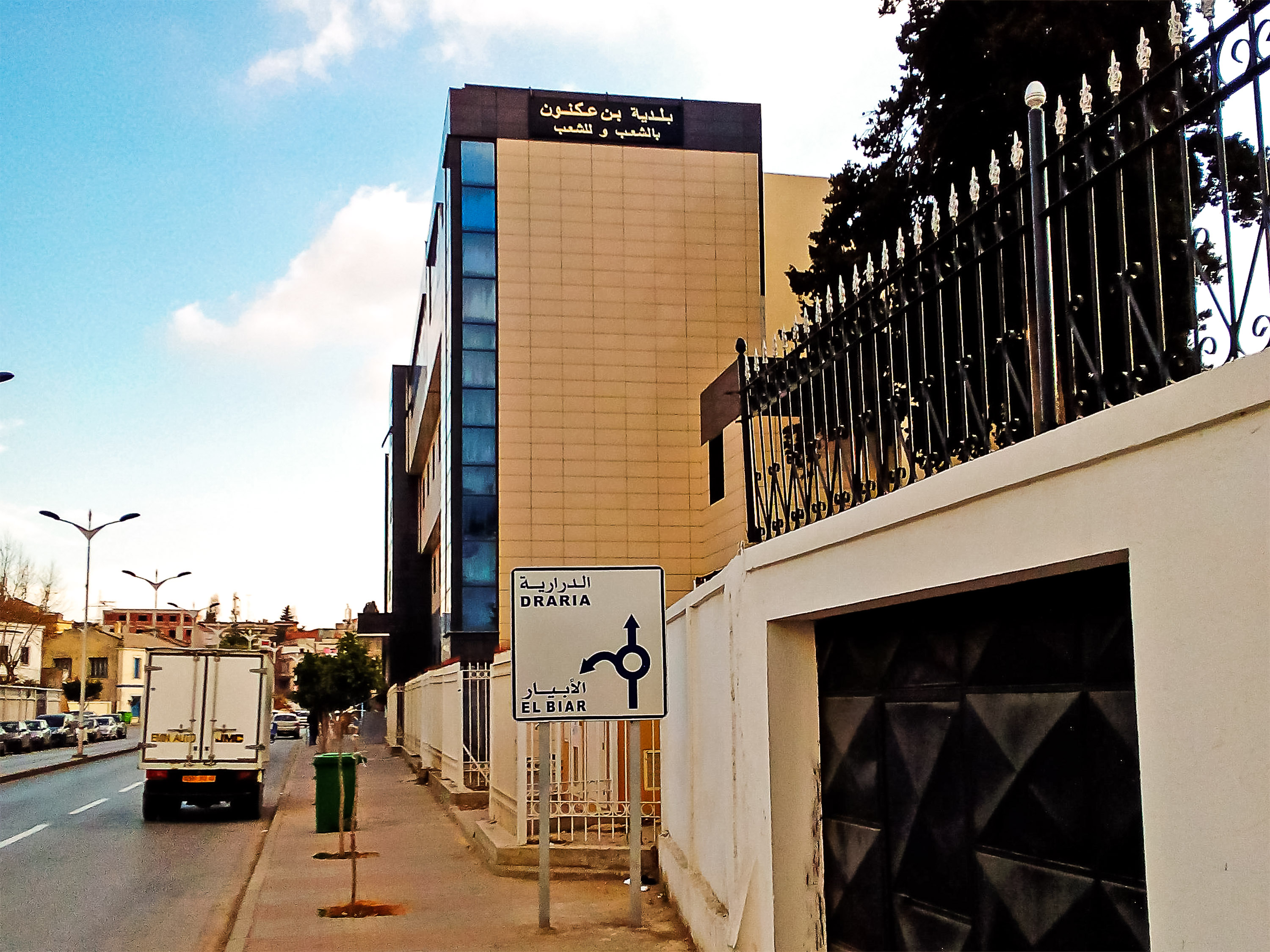

- Country: Algeria
- Province: Algiers

Area
  - Land: 3.67 km^{2} (1.42 sq mi)

Population (2008)
  - Total: 18,838
  - Density: 5,133/km^{2} (13,290/sq mi)
- Time zone: UTC+1 (West Africa Time)

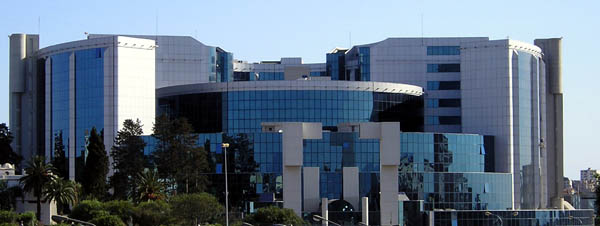
Ministry of Finance building, the Immueble Ahmed Francis

Ben Aknoun (Arabic: بن عكنون) is a commune of Algiers Province and a suburb of the city of Algiers in northern Algeria. As of the 2008 census, the commune's population was 18,838.

== Geography ==
4.8 km (3 mi) west of downtown Algiers, Ben Aknoun sits at an altitude of about 270 m on the 'Sahel Massif', it borders El Biar, Hydra, Dely Brahim, and Bouzareah (clockwise).

== Transport ==
Ben Aknoun is a major transport hub for Algiers, it has a connection to the Southern Ring Road and houses a bus terminal (Ben Aknoun Station).

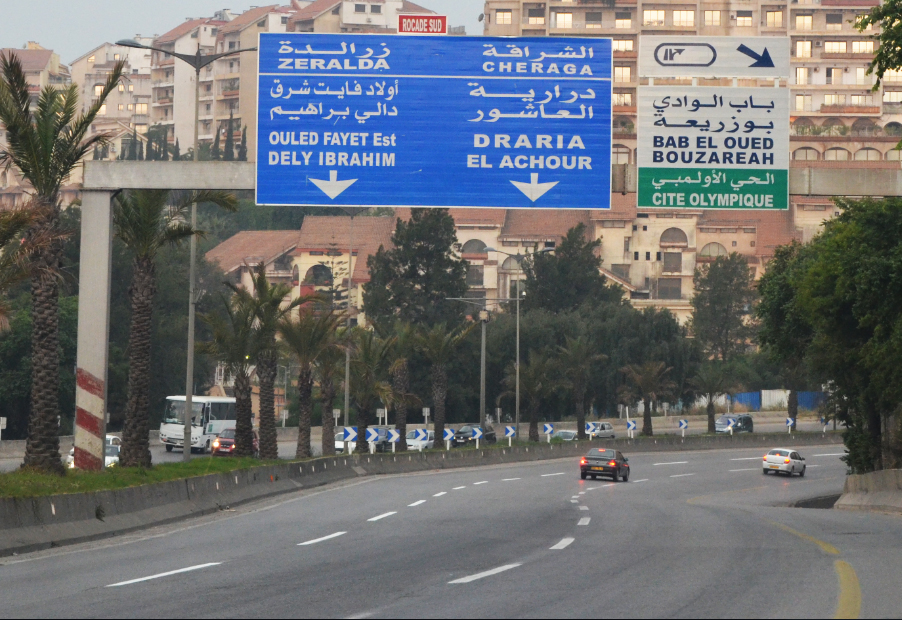
Southern Ring Road of Algiers, Ben Aknoun.

The Ministry of Finance has its head office in the Immeuble Ahmed Francis (Ahmed Francis Building) in Ben Aknoun.

== Education ==
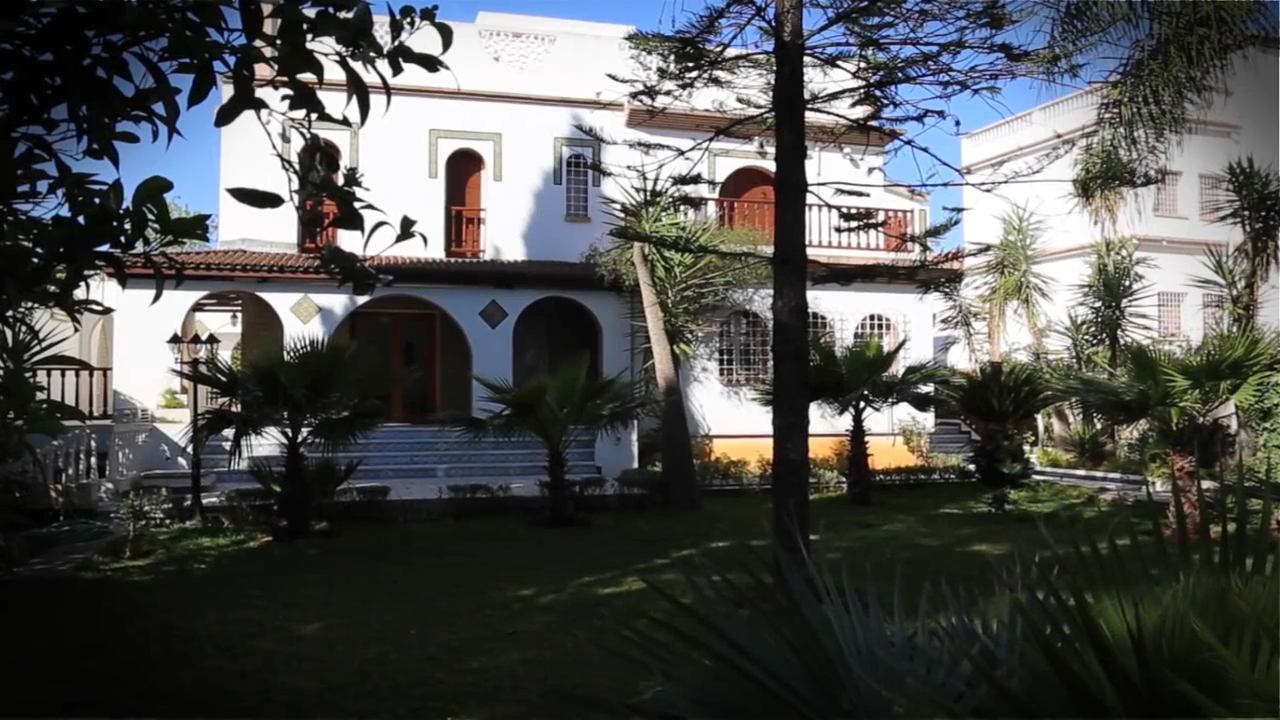
American International School of Algiers' villa in Ben Aknoun in 2016.

The presence of a large diplomatic community in Ben Aknoun prompted the creation of international educational institutions in the commune. The American International School of Algiers provides an academic program for English-speaking students from kindergarten to the seventh grade, taught by U.S. educators. A French school, Lycée International Alexandre-Dumas d'Alger, also has a campus located in the commune, serving French-speaking students from primary school (primaire) to senior high school (lycée).
