= Michael H. Newlin =

American diplomat (1926–2021)

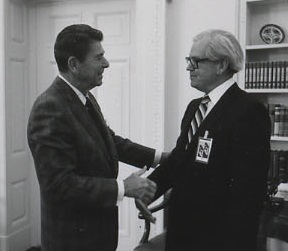
- Newlin with Ronald Reagan in 1981

3rd United States Ambassador to the United Nations International Organizations in Vienna
- In office August 12, 1988 – September 6, 1991
- President: Ronald Reagan; George H. W. Bush
- Preceded by: Bruce Chapman
- Succeeded by: John B. Ritch III

5th United States Ambassador to Algeria
- In office October 28, 1981 – July 21, 1985
- President: Ronald Reagan
- Preceded by: Ulric Haynes
- Succeeded by: L. Craig Johnstone

U.S. Consul General in Jerusalem
- In office 1975–1980
- President: Bill Clinton
- Preceded by: Arthur R. Day
- Succeeded by: Brandon Grove

Personal details
- Born: Michael Holt Newlin; May 16, 1926 Greensboro, North Carolina, U.S.
- Died: August 9, 2021 (aged 95) Chicago, Illinois, U.S.
- Education: Harvard University (B.A., M.B.A.)
- Occupation: Diplomat

Michael Holt Newlin (May 16, 1926 – August 9, 2021) was an American diplomat who served as the United States Ambassador to Algeria. A career Foreign Service officer, he was nominated by Ronald Reagan in August 1981, and served from October 28, 1981, until July 21, 1985. He was also the Representative of the U.S.A. to the Vienna Office of the United Nations from August 12, 1988, until September 6, 1991.

== Early life ==
Born in Greensboro, he lived there until the age of ten or eleven when the family moved to Sanford, North Carolina. He attended Harvard University, living in Leverett House, majoring in government with a “second in economics.” While attending Harvard he wanted to go see operas but did not have enough money to do so, becoming extras in operas to see them while making some money to pay for tuition. He graduated in 1949 and went on to graduate from the Harvard Business School (M.B.A., 1951).

== Career ==
Newlin was a civilian expert with the Department of the Air Force in 1951-52, leaving to enter the Foreign Service. He was an economic and consular officer in Frankfurt and political officer in Oslo in 1954-58. Within a week of arriving in Norway he went skiing (for the first time) with his wife Milena and broke his leg. Later positions included foreign affairs officer in the Office of United Nations Political Affairs (1958–63), deputy chief of the political section in Paris/USNATO (1963–67) and in Brussels/USNATO (1967–68), counselor for political affairs at the United States Mission to the United Nations in New York in 1968-72. Deputy Chief of Mission in Kinshasa (1972–75) and principal officer in Jerusalem in 1975-80. In 1980-81 he was Deputy Assistant Secretary of State for International Organization Affairs.

After his term as United States Ambassador to Algeria, Newlin served as Deputy Assistant Secretary of State for Consular Affairs, where, before the Senate and opposed by Kurt Vonnegut, he defended provisions of the Immigration and Nationality Act of 1952 involving good moral character, including denial of visas to aliens prejudicial to the public interest.

Diplomatic posts
Preceded by Ulric Haynes	United States Ambassador to Algeria; 1981–1985	Succeeded by L. Craig Johnstone
Preceded by Bruce Chapman	United States Ambassador to the United Nations International Organizations in Vienna; 1988-1991	Next: John B. Ritch III
