= Joan A. Polaschik =

American diplomat

Joan Polaschik
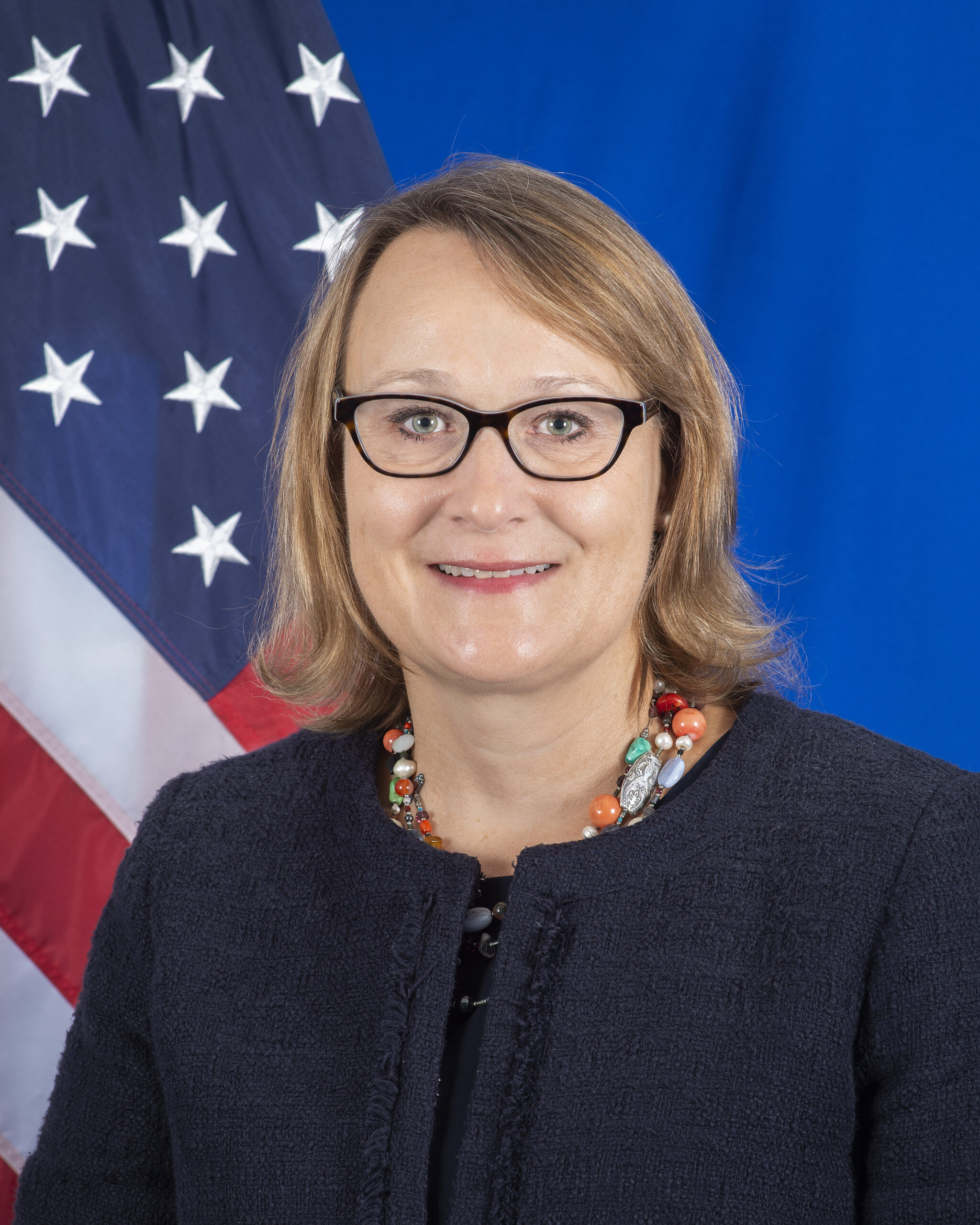

Director of the Foreign Service Institute
- In office May 20, 2022 – March 3, 2025
- President: Joe Biden
- Preceded by: Daniel Bennett Smith
- Succeeded by: Maria E. Brewer (acting)

16th United States Ambassador to Algeria
- In office October 29, 2014 – April 27, 2017
- President: Barack Obama; Donald Trump
- Preceded by: Henry Ensher
- Succeeded by: John Desrocher

Personal details
- Born: 1969 (age 56–57)
- Education: University of Virginia (BA); Georgetown University (MS)

Joan A. Polaschik (born 1969) is a diplomat who had served as Director of the Foreign Service Institute. She previously served as the United States Ambassador to Algeria from 2014 to 2017.

== Early life and education ==
Polaschik grew up in Alexandria, Virginia. Polaskchik attended the University of Virginia, where she earned a Bachelor of Arts in Russian Studies and Foreign Affairs in 1991. She earned a Master of Science from Georgetown University in foreign service.

== Career ==
Polaschik joined the U.S. Foreign Service in 1995. Her initial assignments brought her to Tashkent, Uzbekistan, and in 1997 she became a political officer at the embassy in Tunis, Tunisia. In 1999 she became a staff assistant in the State Department's Bureau of Near Eastern Affairs. Her next assignments brought her to Amman, Jordan, where she dealt with the issue of refugees from the Iraq war and to Baku, Azerbaijan.

In 2009 Polaschik moved to Tripoli, Libya, as deputy chief of mission. As the embassy's chargé d'affaires she coordinated evacuation of non-essential embassy staff and dependents. The embassy in Tripoli was then shut down, the first time in 12 years the U.S. closed a mission. Before the final evacuation, Polaschik stayed up all night destroying computers and sensitive information. After escaping from Libya, embassy staff reunited in Washington, D.C., and established an embassy-in-exile.

On September 11, 2012, the consulate was attacked and four people, including Ambassador J. Christopher Stevens, were killed.

In 2013 she began an assignment as Director in the Office of Israel and Palestinian Affairs with the State Department's Bureau of Near Eastern Affairs.

Polaschik was nominated by President Barack Obama and confirmed by the Senate July 29, 2014 as the United States Ambassador to Algeria. Her term began October 29, 2014 and ended on April 27, 2017.

From 2017 to 2019, she served as acting Principal Deputy Assistant Secretary of State for Near Eastern Affairs. She spent the 2019–2020 academic year as a senior State Department fellow at Georgetown University's Institute for the Study of Diplomacy.

Polaschik joined the Foreign Service Institute in February 2020, serving first as Dean of the School of Professional and Area Studies and then as deputy director. She served as acting director since January 2022. On May 20, 2022, Secretary of State Antony Blinken designated Polaschik to serve as the 22nd Director of the Foreign Service Institute.

== Personal life ==
In addition to English, Polaschik speaks French and Arabic, having studied Arabic at the Foreign Service Institute.

== See also ==
- List of current ambassadors of the United States

Diplomatic posts
Preceded by Henry Ensher	United States Ambassador to Algeria; 2014–2017	Succeeded by John Desrocher
