= Elizabeth Moore Aubin =

American diplomat

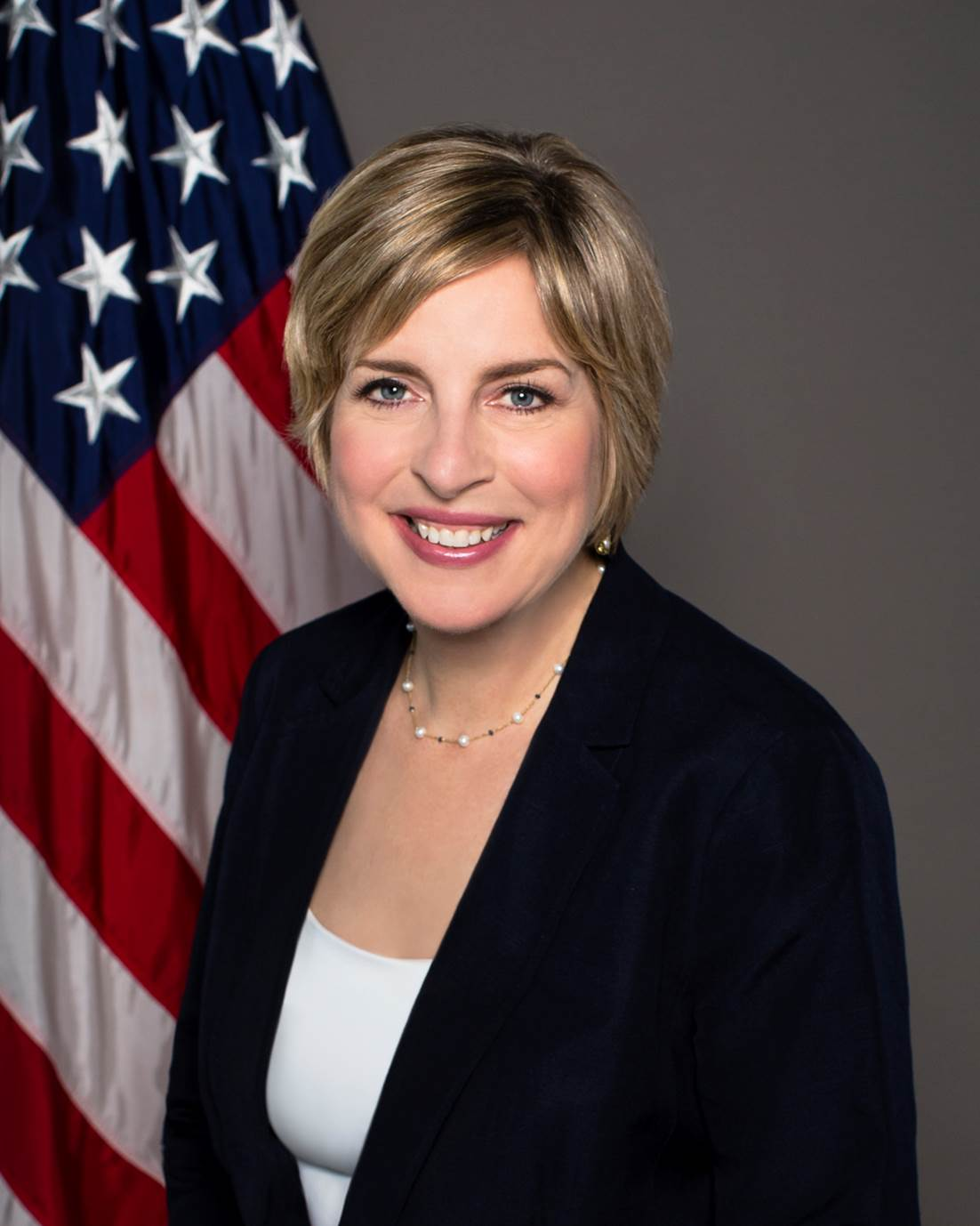

18th United States Ambassador to Algeria
- In office February 9, 2022 – January 16, 2026
- President: Joe Biden; Donald Trump
- Preceded by: John Desrocher

Deputy Assistant Secretary for Regional Multilateral Affairs
- Acting
- In office January 20, 2021 – June 7, 2021
- President: Joe Biden

Personal details
- Education: Barnard College (BA); Syracuse University

Elizabeth Moore Aubin is an American diplomat and State Department official who had served as U.S. ambassador to Algeria. She previously served as acting principal deputy assistant secretary and deputy assistant secretary for regional multilateral affairs from January 20, 2021 to June 7, 2021. In June 2024, Aubin was nominated to serve as the United States ambassador to Cameroon.

== Early life and education ==
Aubin is a native of Great Falls, Virginia. She attended Langley High School, graduating in 1983. Aubin earned her Bachelor of Arts from Barnard College in 1987 and did graduate work at the Maxwell School of Citizenship and Public Affairs of Syracuse University.

== Career ==
Aubin, a career member of the Senior Foreign Service, class of Minister-Counselor, served as the acting principal deputy assistant secretary in the Bureau of Near Eastern Affairs at the Department of State from January 20 to June 7, 2021. Other senior leadership roles held by Aubin during her three decades of service are executive director of the Joint Executive Office of the Bureau of Near Eastern Affairs and the Bureau of South and Central Asian Affairs, deputy chief of mission of the United States Embassy in Ottawa, Canada in 2017; from 2014 to 2016 she was the executive director of the Bureau of Western Hemisphere Affairs; and deputy chief of mission of the U.S. Embassy in Algiers, Algeria. Additional roles in her career include when she also served as the management counselor for embassy in Tel Aviv; international resource management officer for USNATO in Brussels; management officer at the Consulate General in Toronto; and as a general services officer at the Consulate General in Hong Kong. Her two entry-level tours were at the United States embassy in Rome and at the Consulate General in Curaçao.

=== United States ambassador to Algeria ===
On April 15, 2021, President Joe Biden nominated Aubin to be the next United States ambassador to Algeria. Hearings on her nomination were held before the Senate Foreign Relations Committee on June 9, 2021. The committee reported her favorably to the Senate floor on June 24, 2021. On December 18, 2021, the United States Senate confirmed her by voice vote.

Aubin presented her credentials to President Abdelmadjid Tebboune on February 9, 2022.

=== Nomination as U.S. ambassador to Cameroon ===
On June 13, 2024, President Joe Biden nominated Aubin to serve as the United States ambassador to Cameroon. On June 18, 2024, her nomination was sent to the Senate. Her nomination is pending before the Senate Foreign Relations Committee.

== Personal life ==
Aubin speaks French and Italian.

== See also ==
- Ambassadors of the United States

Diplomatic posts
Preceded by Gautam Rana; Chargé d'Affaires	United States Ambassador to Algeria; 2022–2026	Vacant
