= List of ambassadors of the United States to Algeria =

Ambassador of the United States to Algeria
- سفارة الولايات المتحدة في الجزائر
- Seal of the United States Department of State

- Flag of a United States ambassador

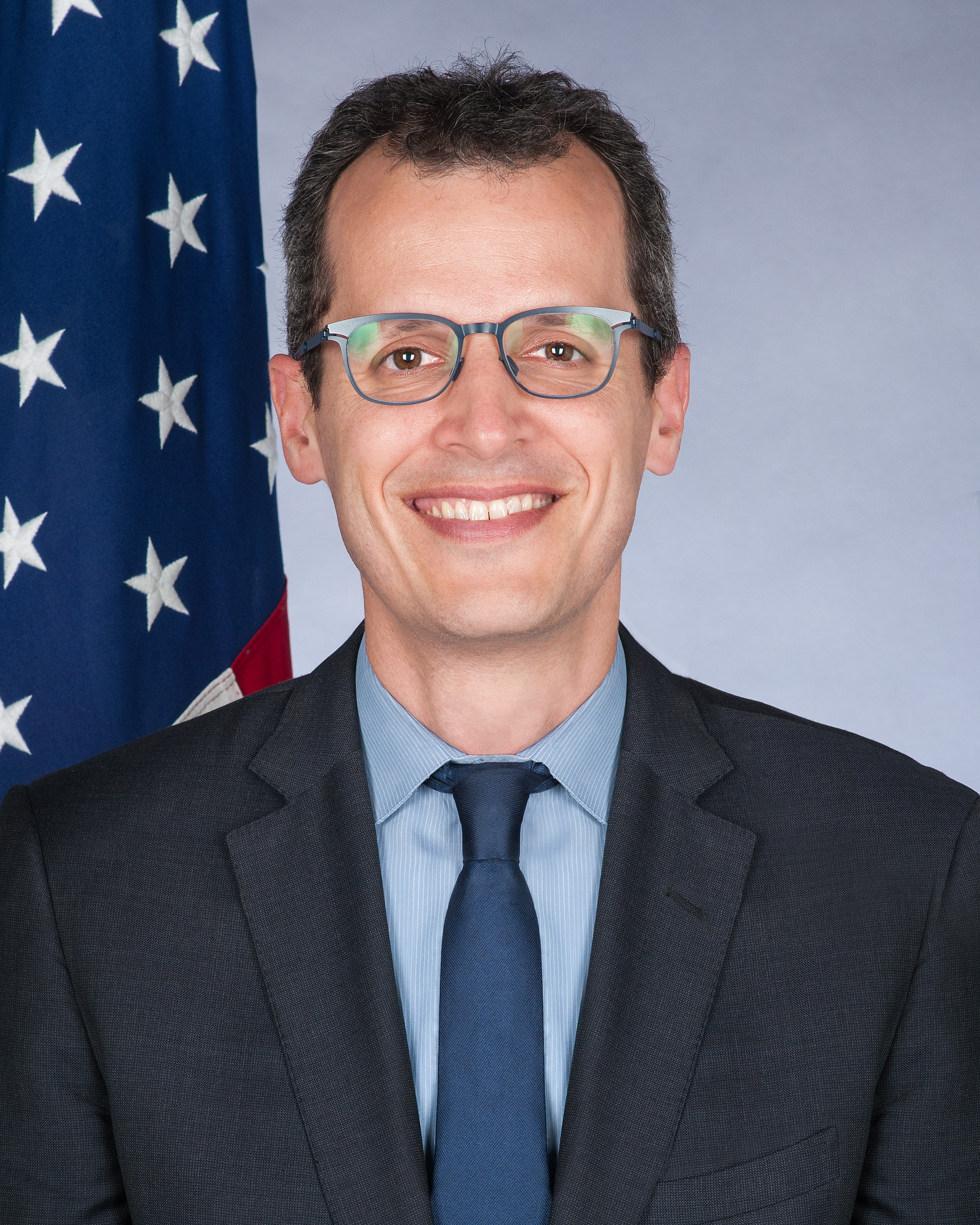
- Incumbent; Mark A. Schapiro; Chargé d'affaires since March 1, 2026
- Nominator: The president of the United States
- Appointer: The president with Senate advice and consent
- Inaugural holder: William J. Porter
- Formation: September 29, 1962
- Website: U.S. Embassy – Algiers

The ambassador of the United States to Algeria is the official representative of the president of the United States to the head of state of Algeria.

Until 1962, Algeria had been under the dominion of France. Independence from France was formally declared on July 3, 1962. The United States and France both formally recognized Algeria on that same day. The Ottoman government had recognized the United States in 1795, but formal diplomatic relations had not been established.

The U.S. has had consular representation in Algeria intermittently since 1796. On September 29, 1962, diplomatic relations between Algeria and the United States were formally established when the U.S. Consulate General in Algiers was raised to embassy status. William J. Porter was appointed as the first chargé d'affaires ad interim pending appointment of an ambassador to Algiers. He was promoted to ambassador on November 29, 1962.

Algeria severed diplomatic relations with the United States on June 6, 1967, in the wake of the June 1967 Arab-Israeli War. A U.S. Interests Section was established in the Swiss Embassy. The United States and Algeria reestablished diplomatic relations, and their respective embassies in Algiers and Washington reopened on November 12, 1974.

== Ambassadors and chiefs of mission ==
#	Name (Note: The US ambassador holds the title Ambassador Extraordinary and Plenipotentiary)	Appointed	Presented credentials	Terminated mission
-	William J. Porter – Career FSO	Chargé d’Affaires ad interim	July 3, 1962	Promoted to ambassador, November 29, 1962
1	William J. Porter – Career FSO	November 29, 1962	December 17, 1962	July 29, 1965
2	John D. Jernegan – Career FSO	July 22, 1965	October 13, 1965	June 10, 1967 (Note: Algeria severed diplomatic relations with the U.S.) (Note: From 1967 to 1974, the United States maintained an Interests Section through the Swiss embassy in Algeria. The chiefs of mission (titled Principal Officer) at the U.S. Interests Section were Lewis Hoffacker (1967–1969) and William L. Eagleton, Jr. (1969–1974))
-	Richard Bordeaux Parker – Career FSO	Chargé d'Affaires	November 12, 1974	Promoted to ambassador, December 18, 1974
3	Richard Bordeaux Parker – Career FSO	December 18, 1974	January 17, 1975	February 12, 1977
4	Ulric St. Clair Haynes, Jr. – Political appointee	May 11, 1977	July 13, 1977	January 28, 1981
-	Christopher W. S. Ross – Career FSO	Chargé d’Affaires ad interim	January 28, 1981	September 1981
5	Michael H. Newlin – Career FSO	September 28, 1981	October 28, 1981	July 21, 1985
6	L. Craig Johnstone – Career FSO	July 12, 1985	September 9, 1985	July 10, 1988
7	Christopher W.S. Ross – Career FSO	August 12, 1988	September 20, 1988	August 14, 1991
8	Mary Ann Casey – Career FSO	July 2, 1991	September 8, 1991	October 19, 1994
9	Ronald E. Neumann – Career FSO	July 5, 1994	September 18, 1994	September 19, 1997
10	Cameron R. Hume – Career FSO	November 10, 1997	December 28, 1997	September 13, 2000
11	Janet A. Sanderson – Career FSO	September 15, 2000	October 30, 2000	May 13, 2003
12	Richard W. Erdman – Career FSO	May 23, 2003	July 26, 2003	January 9, 2006
13	Robert Stephen Ford – Career FSO	May 30, 2006	September 4, 2006	June 26, 2008
14	David D. Pearce – Career FSO	August 4, 2008	September 2, 2008	April 11, 2011
15	Henry S. Ensher – Career FSO	June 1, 2011	August 10, 2011	September 3, 2014
16	Joan A. Polaschik – Career FSO	July 29, 2014	October 29, 2014	April 27, 2017
17	John Desrocher – Career FSO	August 3, 2017	September 5, 2017	January 20, 2021
-	Gautam Rana – Career FSO	Chargé d’Affaires ad interim	January 20, 2021	February 9, 2022
18	Elizabeth Moore Aubin – Career FSO	December 21, 2021	February 9, 2022	January 16, 2026
-	Ryan L. Palsrok – Career FSO	Chargé d’Affaires ad interim	January 17, 2026	March 1, 2026
-	Mark A. Schapiro – Career FSO	Chargé d’Affaires ad interim	March 1, 2026	Present

== See also ==
- Algeria – United States relations
- Foreign relations of Algeria
- Ambassadors of the United States
