= Madjid Bouguerra =

Algerian diplomat

Madjid Bouguerra (born January 8, 1949, in Oum El-Bouaghi, Algeria) is an Algerian diplomat. As ambassador to the United States, he presented his credentials to President Barack Obama on February 13, 2015 until February 23, 2015.

He has had several ambassadorial posts: Zambia (1987–1990), Niger (1992–1997), China (2001–2005) and Germany (2010–2013).

In 2007, he was named secretary general of the Ministry of Foreign Affairs.

Bouguerra attended the National School of Administration (class of 1973) before studying economics at the University of Algiers, graduating from there in 1974.

In September 2021, Abdelmadjid Tebboune announced to replace Madjid Bouguerra with Ahmed Boutache as new ambassador to the US.
