= Ricardo Zúñiga =

American diplomat

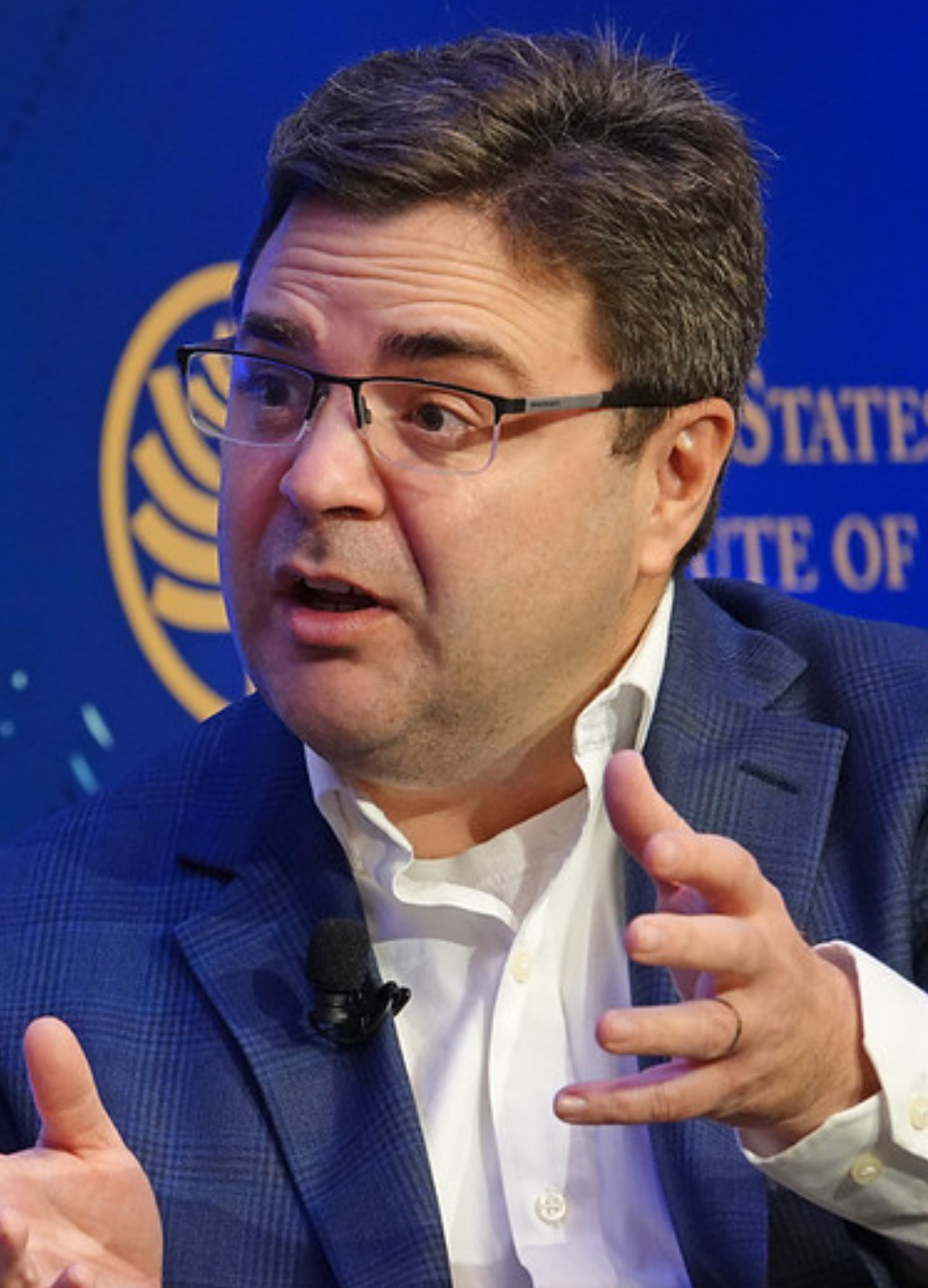
- Zúñiga in 2024

Special Envoy for the Northern Triangle
- In office March 22, 2021 – July 28, 2023
- President: Joe Biden
- Preceded by: Office established

Principal Deputy Assistant Secretary, Bureau of Western Hemisphere Affairs
- In office September 16, 2021 – July 28, 2023
- President: Joe Biden
- Preceded by: Hugo Rodriguez
- Succeeded by: Mark A. Wells

Assistant Secretary of State for Western Hemisphere Affairs
- Acting
- In office August 3, 2021 – September 15, 2021
- President: Joe Biden
- Preceded by: Julie Chung
- Succeeded by: Brian A. Nichols

Personal details
- Born: Tegucigalpa, Honduras
- Education: University of Virginia (BA)

Ricardo Zúñiga is the former Principal Deputy Assistant Secretary in the Bureau of Western Hemisphere Affairs, U.S. Department of State.

Zúñiga was appointed as Special Envoy for the Northern Triangle on 22 March 2021. The Special Envoy engages with regional governments, including but not limited to Mexico, El Salvador, Guatemala, and Honduras, on a range of issues in order to seek to improve conditions in Central America. He also held regional governments accountable for their commitments to address root causes of migration and the increase in arrivals of unaccompanied children at the U.S. southern border.

In August 2021, he was appointed Principal Deputy Assistant Secretary in the Bureau of Western Hemisphere Affairs. He succeeded Julie Chung as acting Assistant Secretary of State for Western Hemisphere Affairs until President Biden's nominee, Brian A. Nichols, was confirmed in the Senate. He left office on July 28, 2023.

From 2015 to 2018, he was the U.S. Consul General serving at São Paulo, Brazil. From 2012 to 2015, he served as Special Assistant to the President and Senior Director for Western Hemisphere Affairs at the National Security Council. He also played a key role in normalizing relations with Cuba.

== Early life and education ==
Zúñiga was born in Tegucigalpa, Honduras. He has a Bachelor of Arts degree in Foreign Affairs and Latin American studies from the University of Virginia.
