= Julie J. Chung =

Korean-American diplomat (born 1973)

Julie Chung
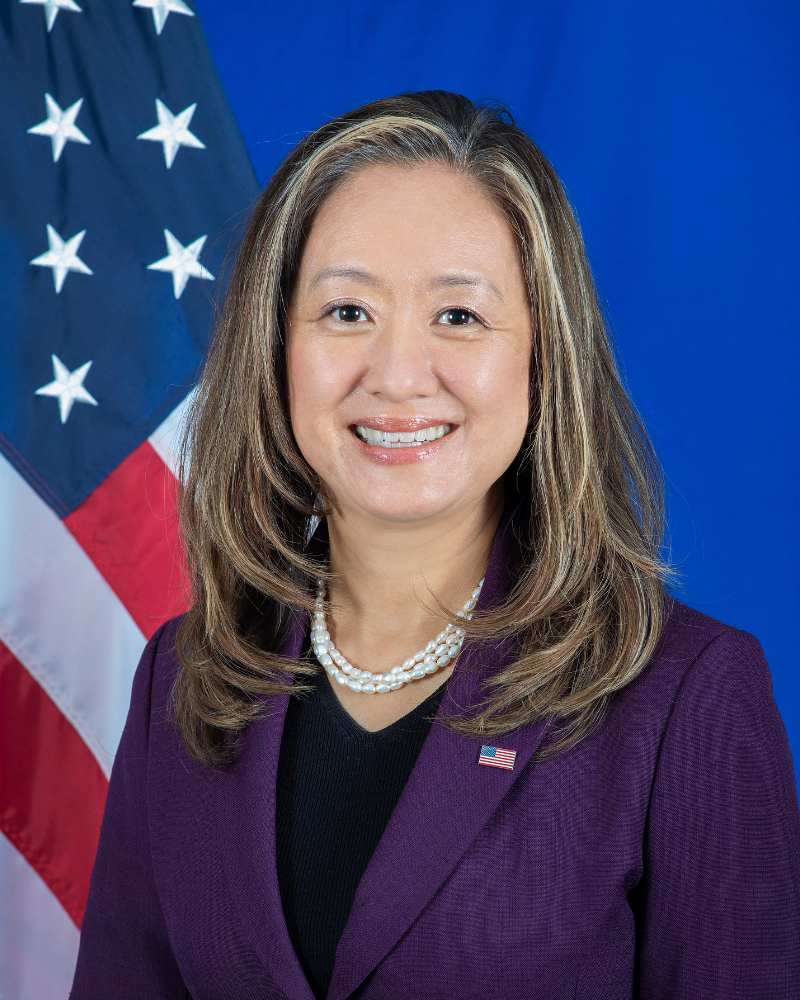

United States Ambassador to Sri Lanka and the Maldives
- In office February 25, 2022 – January 16, 2026
- President: Joe Biden; Donald Trump
- Preceded by: Alaina B. Teplitz
- Succeeded by: Eric Meyer

Assistant Secretary of State for Western Hemisphere Affairs
- Acting
- In office January 20, 2021 – August 3, 2021
- President: Joe Biden
- Preceded by: Michael Kozak
- Succeeded by: Ricardo Zúñiga

Principal Deputy Assistant Secretary, Bureau of Western Hemisphere Affairs
- In office November 2018 – January 20, 2021
- President: Donald Trump
- Preceded by: Kenneth H. Merten
- Succeeded by: Hugo Rodriguez

Deputy Chief of Mission, United States Embassy Phnom Penh
- In office 2014–2017
- President: Barack Obama
- Preceded by: Jeff Daigle
- Succeeded by: Michael Newbill

Personal details
- Born: Chung Ji-yoon; 1973 (age 52–53) Seoul, South Korea
- Education: University of California, San Diego (BA); Columbia University (MA)

Korean name
- Hangul: 정지윤
- Hanja: 鄭智允
- RR: Jeong Jiyun
- MR: Chŏng Chiyun

Julie Jiyoon Chung (Korean: 줄리 정, birth 1973), birth name as Chung Ji-yoon (Korean: 정지윤; Hanja: 鄭智允), is a Korean-American diplomat who served as the United States Ambassador to Sri Lanka from February 25, 2022 to January 16, 2026. She previously served as Acting Assistant Secretary and Principal Deputy Assistant Secretary for the United States Department of State's Bureau of Western Hemisphere Affairs (WHA). Her first overseas assignment was in Guangzhou, China. Chung has later served in several posts in Japan, Vietnam, Thailand, Cambodia, Colombia and Iraq.

== Early life and education ==
Born in Seoul, South Korea, Chung immigrated to California with her family in 1977 at the age of 5.

She received a Bachelor of Arts in political science from the University of California, San Diego and a Master of Arts in international affairs from Columbia University.

== Career ==
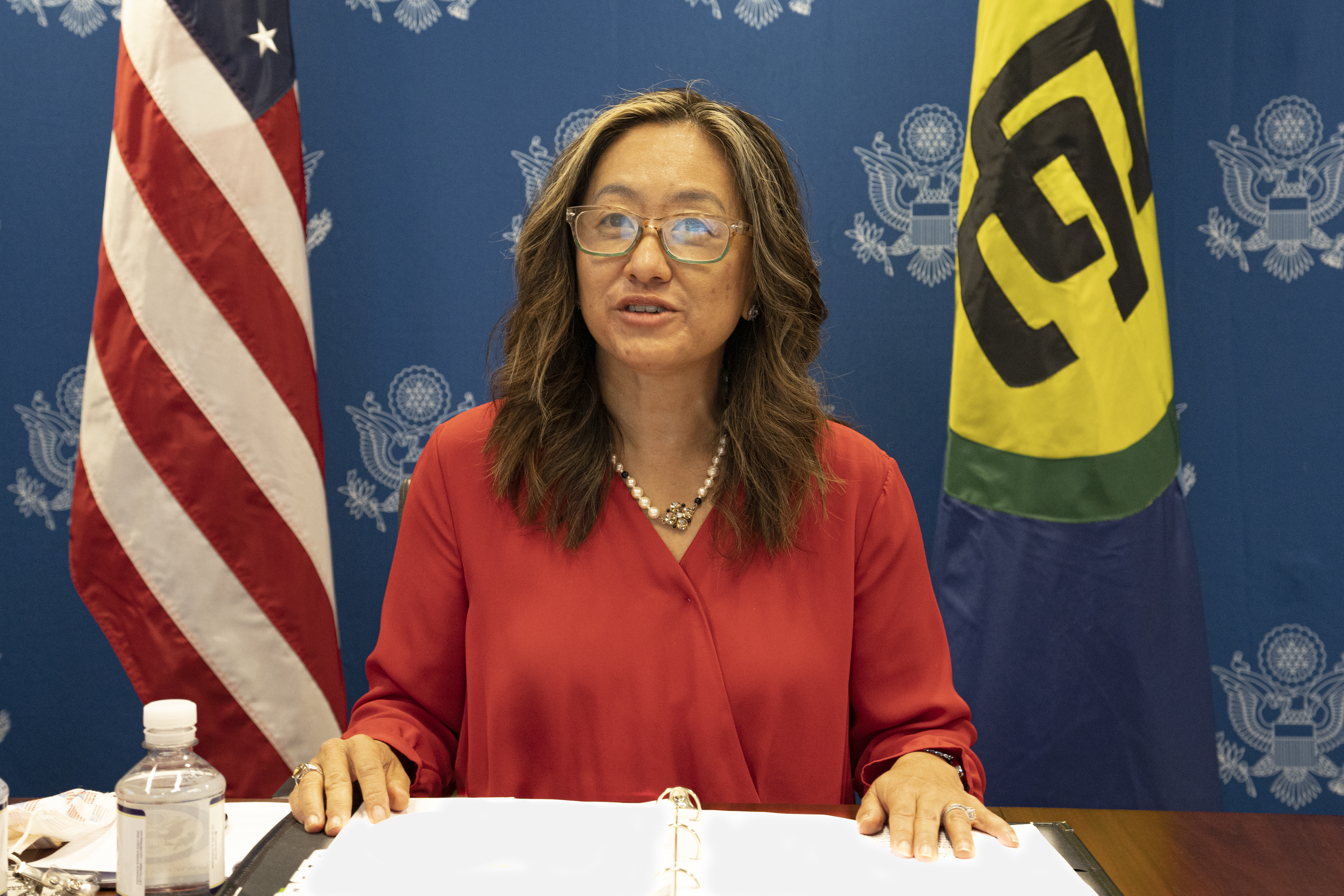
Chung joins Secretary Blinken's virtual roundtable with Foreign Ministers of the Caribbean Community (CARICOM), from the US Department of State in Washington, D.C., on April 21, 2021.

After joining the Foreign Service in 1996, Chung's first overseas post was as a consular officer at the United States Consulate General Guangzhou, China. At the United States Embassy Tokyo, Japan, she worked as the bilateral trade officer for the civil aviation and automobile sectors. While posted to the Office of Korean Affairs, Bureau of East Asian and Pacific Affairs (EAP/K), she traveled frequently to Pyongyang, North Korea, representing the US working-level group for the Korean Peninsula Energy Development Organization (KEDO). In April 2003, she served as Special Assistant for EAP to Richard Armitage, Deputy Secretary of State. At the Embassy Hanoi, Vietnam, she acted as an Assistant Public Affairs Officer, and later as a coordinator for the Asia-Pacific Economic Cooperation (APEC). During her tenure as Deputy Political Counselor at the Embassy Bogota, Colombia, she managed the US government's largest extradition program, as well as the United States representative to the Group of 24 (G-24). In Baghdad, Iraq, she served as Chief of Staff coordinating civilian-military foreign assistance with 13 agencies and sections.

In August 2014, Chung was assigned to be the Deputy Chief of Mission (DCM) for the Embassy Phnom Penh. In August 2017, she was transferred back to the US to serve as the Director for the Office of Japanese Affairs (EAP/J). and served as Acting Deputy Assistant Secretary from February–September 2018. From November 2018 to January 2021 she served as the Principal Deputy Assistant Secretary in the Bureau of Western Hemisphere Affairs.

=== Ambassador to Sri Lanka ===
On June 15, 2021, President Joe Biden nominated Chung to serve as United States Ambassador to Sri Lanka. Hearings on her nomination were held before the Senate Foreign Relations Committee on October 20, 2021. The committee reported her nomination favorably on November 3, 2021. The United States Senate confirmed Chung on December 18, 2021, by voice vote. On February 25, 2022, she presented her credentials to President Gotabaya Rajapaksa of Sri Lanka.

US Ambassador Julie Chung has been accused by Sri Lankan parliamentarian, former minister Mr. Wimal Weerawansa of being involved in a conspiracy to overthrow former President Gotabaya Rajapaksa and his government. These allegations were made in Mr. Weerawansa's book, "Navaya: Sengawunu Kathawa" (Nine: The Hidden Story), and were also referenced during his speech at the book's launch on April 25, 2023. These allegations have been widely dismissed as misinformation attacks, with allegations that the Chinese government funded Weerawansa's book.

On August 31, 2023, the Federation of National Organizations (Sri Lanka based Political Organization) delivered a letter to Sri Lanka's Minister of Foreign Affairs Hon. Ali Sabry, urging decisive measures to be taken against the US Ambassador Julie Chung to Sri Lanka due to violations of diplomatic protocols. The Sri Lankan Ministry of Foreign Affairs dismissed this letter.

In October 2023, the Sri Lankan Parliament's Sectoral Oversight Committee on National Security recommended informing US Ambassador Julie Chung to avoid commenting on Sri Lanka's internal affairs. This advice was prompted by the ambassador's remarks following the events of May 9, 2022. The Committee's Chairman, Retired Rear Admiral Sarath Weerasekera, expressed concern in a letter to the State Defense Minister, questioning the legitimacy of statements about peaceful protests. Weerasekera accused the ambassador of conveying a negative image of Sri Lanka globally and accused her of endorsing acts of sabotage against the government. Citing the Vienna Treaty, he emphasized that ambassadors should not interfere in another country's internal affairs, urging Chung to refrain from such statements in the future. The parliament dismissed these allegations.

On February 13, 2025, the Coalition Against Partition of Sri Lanka (CAPSL) organized a demonstration front of the US Embassy, Colombo, protesting against US Ambassador Julie Chung and accusing her of breaching diplomatic norms. The demonstrators further claimed that USAID funds were being misused to erode Sri Lanka's sovereignty and foster divisions within its communities. They urged US officials to recall Chung from her position.

In January 2026 Chung was recalled by the United States Department of State. She concluded here tenure and left Sri Lanka on February 16, 2026.

== Personal life ==
Chung's father, Jay H. Chung (Korean: 정재훈; Hanja: 鄭載勳) is a space scientist. Her sister, Connie (Korean: 정윤경) served as a producer at a broadcast station in San Francisco. Chung speaks Korean, Japanese, Khmer, and Spanish. She has also learned Cantonese, Vietnamese, and Thai.

Diplomatic posts
Preceded by Jeff Daigle	Deputy chief of mission United States Embassy Phnom Penh; 2014–2017	Succeeded by Michael Newbill
Preceded by Joseph M. Young	Director for the Office of Japanese Affairs; Bureau of East Asian and Pacific Affairs; 2017–2018	Succeeded by James Heller
Preceded by Kenneth H. Merten as Acting PDAS	Principal Deputy Assistant Secretary for Western Hemisphere Affairs; 2018–2021	Succeeded by Hugo Rodriguez
Preceded by Michael Kozak as Acting AS	Acting Assistant Secretary for Western Hemisphere Affairs; 2021	Succeeded by Ricardo Zúñiga
Preceded by Alaina B. Teplitz	United States Ambassador to Sri Lanka; 2022–2026	Succeeded by Jayne Howell, chargé d'affaires a.i.
