= Akron Ice House =

Structure in Akron, Ohio, USA

Coordinates: 41.086957°N 81.5115458°W

Klages Coal and Ice Company
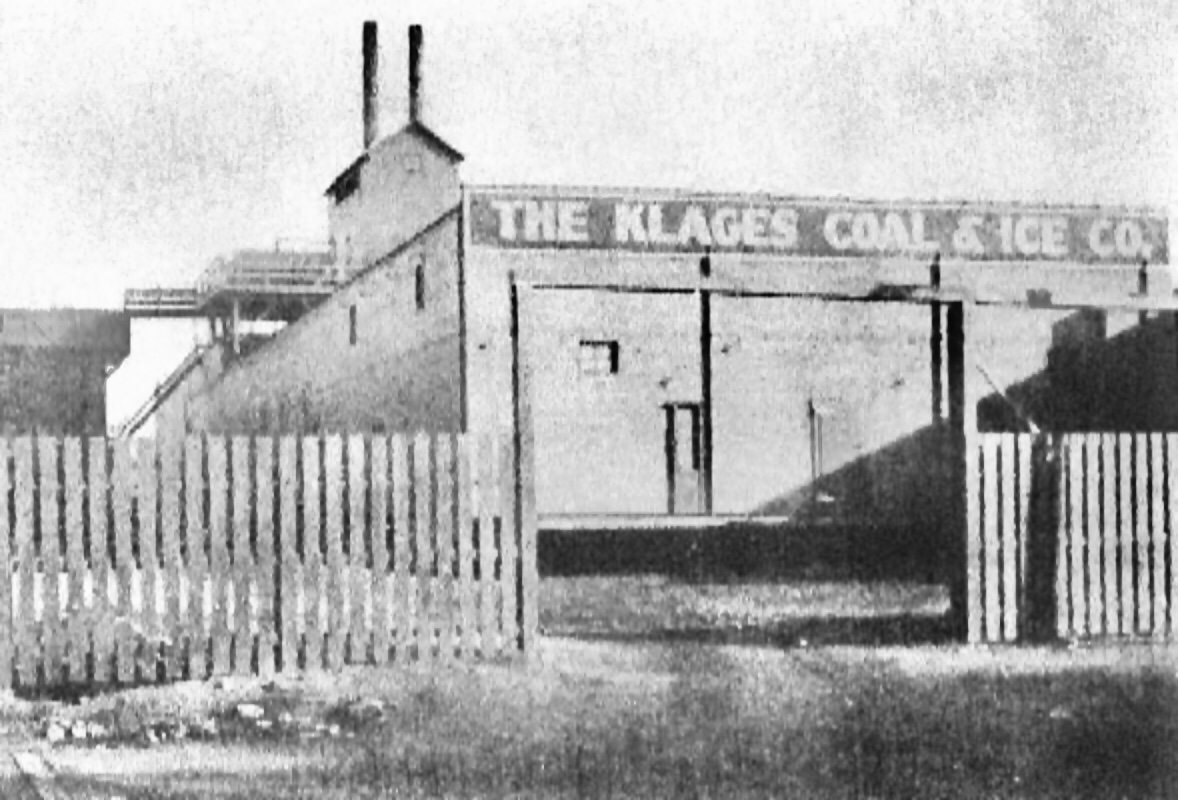
- Interactive map of the Klages Coal and Ice Company area
- Alternative names: Royal Crown Bottling company

General information
- Type: Ice house
- Location: Akron. Ohio
- Completed: 1888
- Owner: Original owner: Henry Klages

Akron Ice House was established in 1879 (incorporated 1888). The Klages Coal & Ice Company was co-founded by German immigrants Henry Klages and August Blessman. The business was passed on to their sons, Louis Klages and Water Blessman. The building was also a Royal Crown Bottling Co. plant.

== History ==
In the late 1880s, Henry Klages won the right to all of the ice on Akron's Blue Pond.

Klages Coal & Ice Company was built in 1888 on N. Summit street, Akron. Klages Coal & Ice was established in 1888 by two German immigrants Henry Klages and August Blessman. Henry Klages died in 1899 and the business was passed to his son Louis Klages and to August Blesman's son, Water Blessman. From 1947 through the 1980s, the building was a Royal Crown Bottling Co. plant.

On January 29, 1892 three of the Klages Coal & Ice ice houses by Summit Lake burned down. A neighbor (Joe Sutters) had started fires nearby, which caused the buildings to burn. Klages Coal & Ice had no insurance, and damages were estimated at $1500.

In January of 1929 Klages Coal & Ice Company acquired two additional companies: Falls Ice Company and Ewart Coal and Ice Company. By 1929 Klages Coal & Ice Company had 100 ice stations and 50 trucks and horse-drawn vehicles.

In 1947, the building was used as a Royal Crown Bottling Company plant, owned by the Klages family.

=== Hodgson v. Klages Coal & Ice Co. (6th Cir. 1970) ===
United States Secretary of Labor James Day Hodgson brought a suit against the bottling company on its claim that routemen were also outside salesmen, and therefore entitled to overtime in addition to the flat fee pay for their route. In 1971 the courts determined that "workers were entitled to overtime pay even though the employer paid routemen a flat fee." They ruled that the company must pay "... its routemen a flat fee plus commissions based on volume."
