= St. Andrew's-Sewanee School =

Private school in Sewanee, Tennessee, US

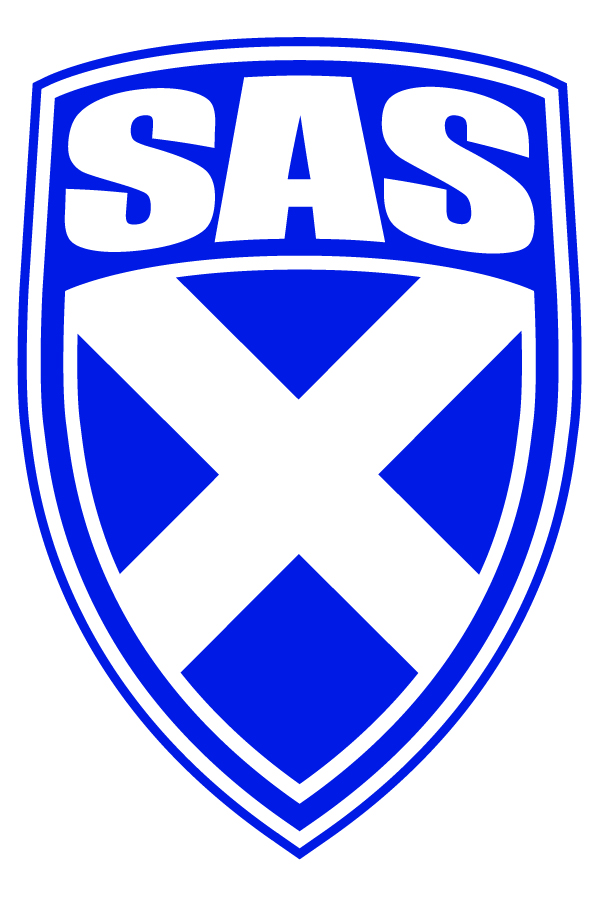
- St. Andrew's-Sewanee Shield

Location
- 290 Quintard Road; Sewanee, Tennessee 37375; United States; 35.2172°N 85.8914°W

Information
- School type: Private, Day & Boarding
- Religious affiliation: Episcopal
- Established: 1868; 1905; 1981 (merger)
- Head of School: Karl Sjolund
- Faculty: 41 teachers
- Grades: 6 to 12
- Gender: Coeducational
- Enrollment: 250 students (30% boarding)
- Average class size: 14 students
- Student to teacher ratio: 5:1
- Campus size: 550 acres (2.2 km^{2})
- Campus type: Rural
- Colors: Blue and Gold
- Athletics: 25 teams in 10 sports
- Athletics conference: TSSAA
- Mascot: Mountain Lion
- Yearbook: The Phoenix
- Endowment: $19 million
- Website: sasweb.org

St. Andrew’s-Sewanee School is a private, coeducational, Episcopal, boarding and day college preparatory school serving 250 students in grades six through twelve. It is located in Sewanee, Tennessee on the Cumberland Plateau between Nashville and Chattanooga and adjacent to the University of the South, which is also affiliated with the Episcopal Church. In addition to outstanding college preparation, the school is known for its close and welcoming community, emphasis on creativity, and opportunities for outdoor adventure.

== History ==
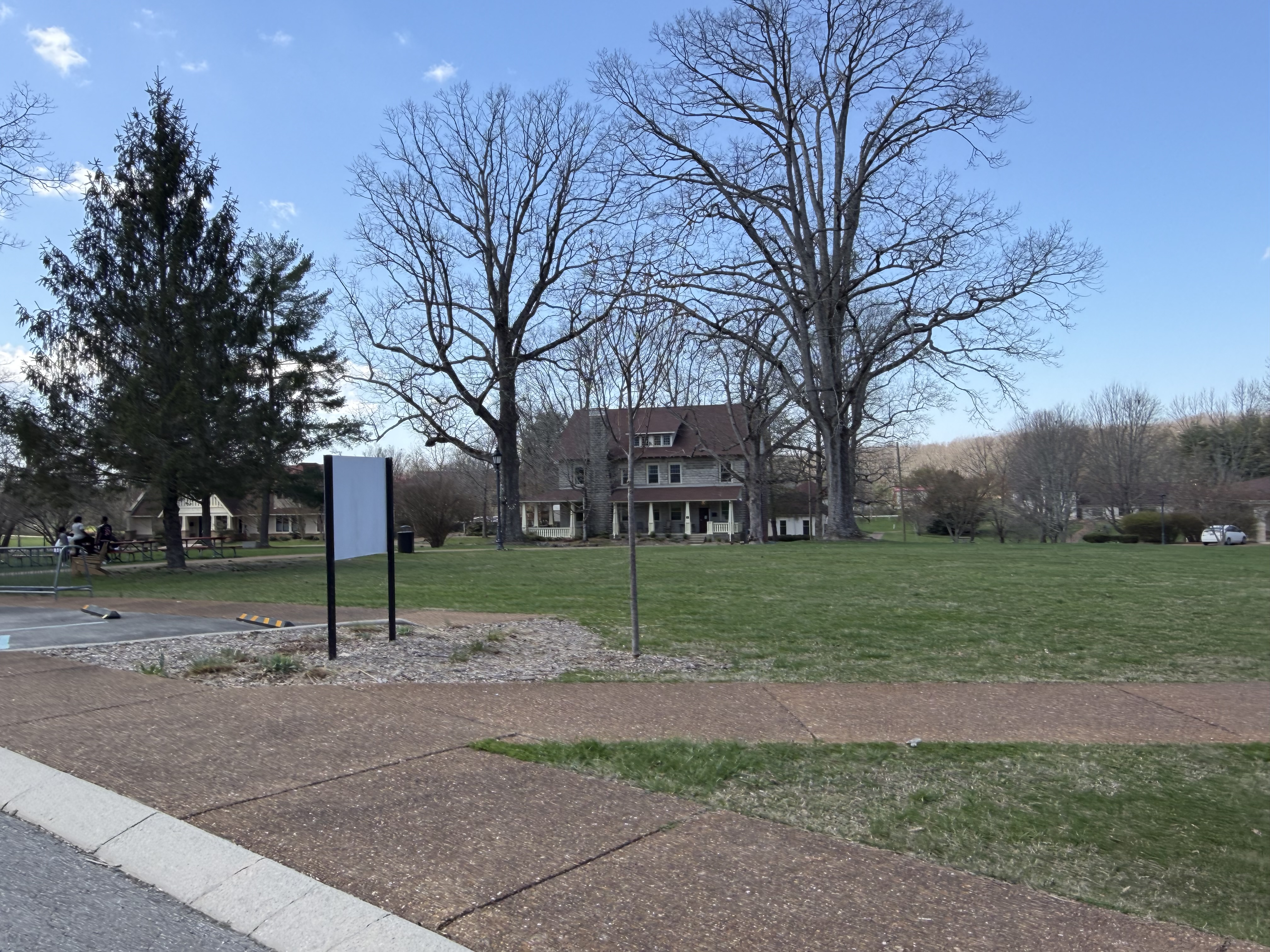
The campus of St. Andrew's-Sewanee School in Sewanee, Tennessee

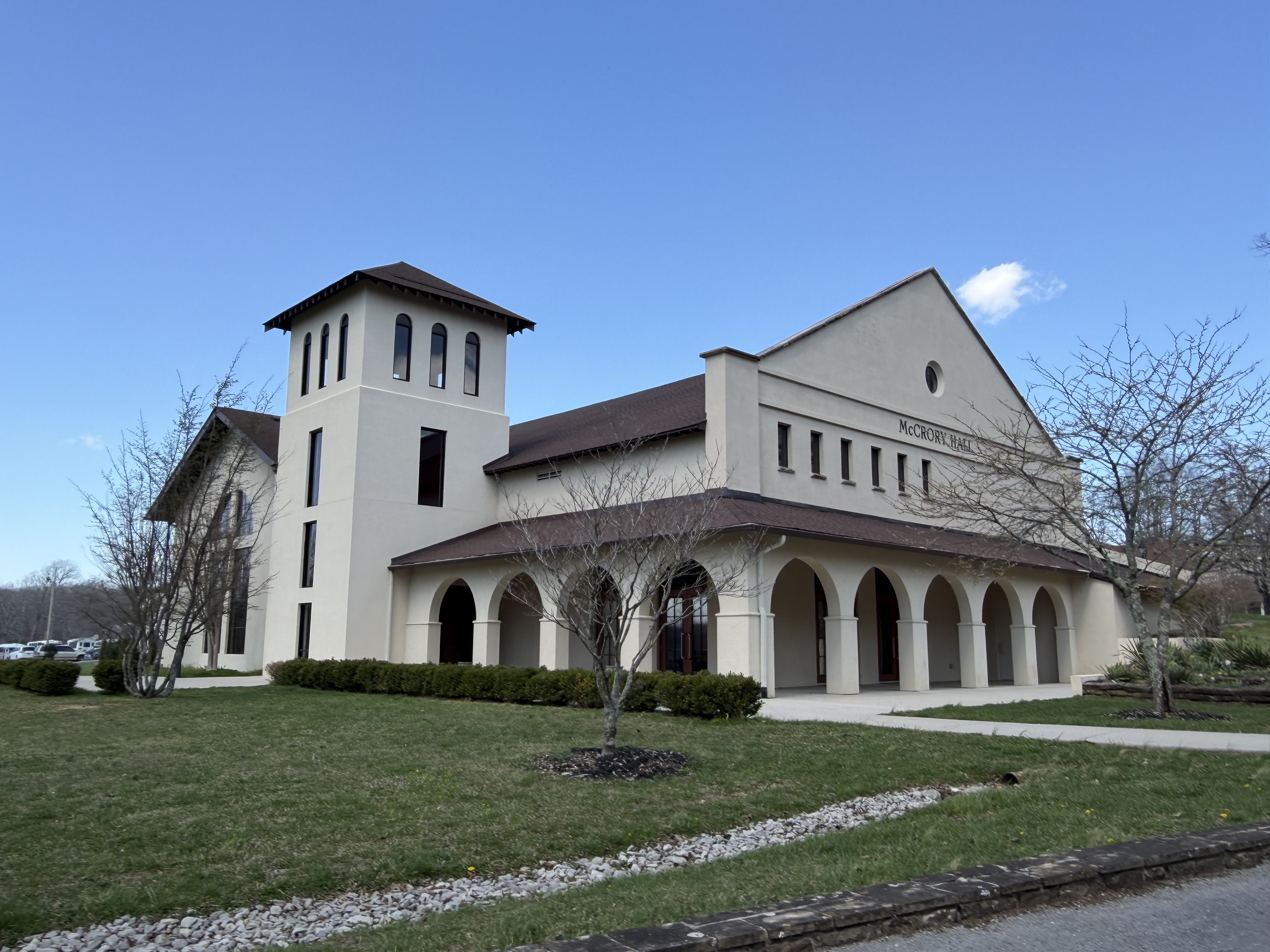
McCrory Hall

The current school, housed on 550 acres (2.2 km^{2}), is the result of the merger of St. Andrew's School, which was located on the same campus, and the Sewanee Academy. The University of the South agreed to merge the Sewanee Academy with St. Andrew's School in 1981.

Sewanee Academy was founded in 1867 as the Junior Department of the University of the South and later became Sewanee Grammar School (1869-1908), then the Sewanee Military Academy. In 1971, Sewanee Military Academy dropped its military program and became known as simply the Sewanee Academy, with a coeducational student body, for the next 10 years. After the 1981 merger and subsequent relocation, the former Academy property was given to the University's School of Theology for use; the school moved from the St. Luke's Hall on the main campus.

St. Andrew's School was founded in 1905 by the Episcopal Order of the Holy Cross (Anglican monastics) with the goal of "breaking the cycle of poverty" for "mountain boys." Originally all-white, St. Andrew's was desegregated in 1965.

A third school, St. Mary's School for Girls, was operated from 1896 to 1968 by the Episcopal Sisters of St. Mary's (also Anglican monastics). After St. Mary's closed, Sewanee Military Academy and St. Andrew's School, which had enrolled only boys, both became coeducational.

== Notable alumni and faculty ==
- James Agee, author
- George R. Allin, American general
- Brian Jordan Alvarez, actor
- Stephen Barber, composer
- Richard Walker Bolling, Democratic congressman from Missouri
- Sean Bridgers, actor
- Kix Brooks, country music singer of Brooks and Dunn fame
- Bruce Cabot, actor
- Saxby Chambliss, U.S. Senator from Georgia
- Mike deGruy, documentary filmmaker
- Charles Duncan, Jr., entrepreneur and statesman
- George Garrett, Princeton University and University of Virginia professor, poet, novelist, scholar
- Max Gladstone, author
- Eban Goodstein, economist, author and sustainability educator
- William Crawford Gorgas, Surgeon General of the U.S. Army
- Haywood S. Hansell, American major general
- Bill Harlow, NCAA wrestling champion at Oklahoma State, won silver medal at 1970 World Wrestling Championships
- Rip Hawkins, football player
- Robin Hemley, author
- Jack Hitt, journalist and author
- Henry Finch Holland, attorney
- John Jay Hooker, attorney, entrepreneur, Tennessee political gadfly
- David Lodge (biologist), Director of Cornell University's David R. Atkinson Center for a Sustainable Future
- Andrew Nelson Lytle, novelist, dramatist, essayist and professor of literature
- Stuart Margolin, actor (The Rockford Files)
- C.J. McCoy, Florida Gators football coach
- Vail M. Pittman, former governor of Nevada
- Miller Puckette, author of Max (software)
- Elisabeth Röhm, actress
- Walter Sillers Jr., politician
