= Henry F. Holland =

American lawyer

Henry Finch Holland
- Born: 1912
- Died: July 18, 1962 (aged 49–50); Greenwich, Connecticut, U.S.
- Education: Sewanee: The University of the South; University of Texas School of Law

Henry F. Holland

5th Assistant Secretary of State for Inter-American Affairs
- In office March 2, 1954 – September 13, 1956
- Preceded by: John M. Cabot
- Succeeded by: Roy R. Rubottom Jr.

Henry Finch Holland (1912–July 18, 1962) was a United States lawyer who served as Assistant Secretary of State for Inter-American Affairs from 1954 to 1956.

== Biography ==
Henry F. Holland was born in 1912 and raised in Brownsville, Texas. He spent his high school years at Sewanee Military Academy in Sewanee, Tennessee. He then attended Sewanee: The University of the South and, after that, the University of Texas School of Law.

After law school, Holland established a law practice in Texas. Holland joined the United States Foreign Service in 1942. His first post as a Foreign Service Officer was to the United States Embassy in Mexico With the end of World War II, Holland left the foreign service in 1945 and resumed the private practice of law. His practice involved international law and in the early 1950s, he was involved in the activities of the International Law Commission.

In 1954, President of the United States Dwight D. Eisenhower named Holland Assistant Secretary of State for Inter-American Affairs and, after Senate confirmation, Holland held this post from March 2, 1954 until September 13, 1956. In this capacity, he was assistant chief of the United States delegation at the tenth Pan-American Conference, held in Caracas in March 1954. He later headed the U.S. delegation to the Inter-American Conference on resources of the sea.

Holland served as international affairs adviser to the Republican Party during the 1956 election campaign. After leaving public office, Holland moved to New York City and, with Sidney I. Roberts, founded the law firm of Roberts & Holland.

Holland died at Greenwich Hospital in Greenwich, Connecticut on July 18, 1962, at the age of 49.

Government offices
Preceded by John M. Cabot	Assistant Secretary of State for Inter-American Affairs; March 2, 1954 – September 13, 1956	Succeeded by Roy R. Rubottom, Jr.
