= Jack B. Kubisch =

American diplomat

15th Assistant Secretary of State for Inter-American Affairs
- In office May 29, 1973 – September 4, 1974
- Preceded by: Charles A. Meyer
- Succeeded by: William D. Rogers

Personal details
- Born: November 5, 1921 Hannibal, Missouri, U.S.
- Died: May 7, 2007 (aged 85) Southern Pines, North Carolina, U.S.
- Children: 4
- Education: Central Methodist University; University of Missouri (AB); Harvard University

Jack Bloom Kubisch (November 5, 1921 – May 7, 2007) was a United States diplomat.

== Biography ==
Jack B. Kubisch was born in Hannibal, Missouri on November 5, 1921. He was educated at Central Methodist University and then the University of Missouri, from which he received an A.B. in 1942. Kubisch enlisted in the United States Navy while he was at college, and upon graduation was commissioned as an ensign. He was initially assigned to serve as an Instructor at the University of Notre Dame. He married Constance Rippe of South Bend, Indiana in 1944. In 1944–45, he served on the USS New York (BB-34) and later the USS Guam (CB-2). In this capacity, he participated in the Philippines Campaign (1944–45) and was present at the Battle of Iwo Jima and the Battle of Okinawa. Having achieved the rank of Lieutenant, he served as Landing Force Officer for a ship's company of United States Marines.

After the war, Kubisch spent a year studying at Harvard Business School and then, in 1947, joined the United States Foreign Service. He was posted to Brazil, and then transferred to Paris in 1949, where he became Assistant to W. Averell Harriman at Marshall Plan Headquarters.

Kubisch resigned from government service in 1950 and spent the next decade working in the private sector as an executive.

In 1961, Kubisch rejoined the Foreign Service, becoming deputy director of the U.S. Operations mission in Colombo. From 1962 to 1964, he was director of the USAID mission in Rio de Janeiro. In 1965, he moved to Washington, D.C. to become director of the United States Department of State's Office of Brazilian Affairs. He returned to the field in 1969, becoming Deputy Chief of Mission in Mexico City.

In 1971, Kubisch was sent to Paris as chargé d'affaires representing the U.S. in the Paris Peace Talks that were to lead to the Paris Peace Accords, intended to end the Vietnam War. He also played a role in negotiations that led to the establishment of the U.S. Liaison Office in Beijing and the Chinese Liaison Office in Washington, D.C.

In March 1973, President of the United States Richard Nixon nominated Kubisch as Assistant Secretary of State for Inter-American Affairs and, after Senate confirmation, Kubisch held this office from May 29, 1973 until September 4, 1974. He also served concurrently as U.S. coordinator of the Alliance for Progress, as a director of the Panama Canal Company, and as a member of the board of directors of the Inter-American Foundation. He received an honorary J.D. from his alma mater Central Methodist University in May 1974.

In August 1974, Kubisch became United States Ambassador to Greece, a position he held until September 1, 1977. He then served as vice president of the National Defense University until his retirement in 1979.

He was awarded the Meritorious Civilian Service Award and the French Legion d'Honneur Award, rank of Commander.

In retirement, Kubisch lived in Pinehurst, North Carolina. In March 1980, he was called out of retirement to serve as U.S. Special Negotiator during the renegotiation of the Treaty of Friendship with Spain. In retirement, he also served as chairman of the board of the National Defense University; as consultant to the Council on Foreign Relations; and as a director of the Panama Canal Company.

Kubisch died in his sleep at his home in Southern Pines, North Carolina on May 7, 2007. He was survived by his wife and four children.

Government offices
Preceded by Charles A. Meyer	Assistant Secretary of State for Inter-American Affairs; May 29, 1973 – September 4, 1974	Succeeded by William D. Rogers
Diplomatic posts
Preceded by Henry J. Tasca	United States Ambassador to Greece; 1974–1977	Succeeded by Robert J. McCloskey
