= Charles A. Meyer =

14th Assistant Secretary of State for Inter-American Affairs
- In office April 2, 1969 – March 2, 1973
- Preceded by: Covey T. Oliver
- Succeeded by: Jack B. Kubisch

Personal details
- Born: June 27, 1918
- Died: August 15, 1996 (aged 78)
- Education: Harvard College

Charles Appleton Meyer (June 27, 1918 – August 15, 1996) was a United States executive who served as Assistant Secretary of State for Inter-American Affairs from 1969 to 1973.

== Biography ==
Meyer was born in 1918 and attended Phillips Academy, graduating in 1935. He then attended Harvard College, graduating in 1939.

After college, Meyer took a job with Sears in Chicago. Meyer rose through the ranks at Sears to become Vice President responsible for Sears' operations in Latin America. His first foray into government service came in 1960 when President of the United States Dwight D. Eisenhower appointed Meyer as one of six members of the National Advisory Committee on Inter-American Affairs. This committee, headed by Milton S. Eisenhower, was designed to be Eisenhower's "eyes and ears" in Latin America and traveled throughout the region meeting with Latin American leaders.

Meyer continued working as a Sears executive until March 1969, when President Richard Nixon appointed him Assistant Secretary of State for Inter-American Affairs. Meyer held this office from April 2, 1969 until March 2, 1973. As Assistant Secretary, Meyer has been accused of intervening in the 1970 Chilean election; Meyer denied that this was the case, saying that the U.S. State Department "financed no candidates, no political parties before or after September 4 [1970]."

Meyer left the State Department in 1973 and returned to Sears, where he worked as an executive until his retirement in 1980. He also served on the board of directors of Lake Forest College. Lake Forest College awarded Meyer an honorary degree in 1983.

Government offices
| Preceded by Covey T. Oliver | Assistant Secretary of State for Inter-American Affairs; April 2, 1969 – March 2, 1973 | Succeeded by Jack B. Kubisch |
