= Roy R. Rubottom Jr. =

American diplomat (1912–2010)

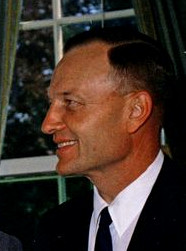
- Rubottom in 1961

6th Assistant Secretary of State for Inter-American Affairs
- In office June 18, 1957 – August 27, 1960
- President: Dwight D. Eisenhower
- Preceded by: Henry F. Holland
- Succeeded by: Thomas C. Mann

34th United States Ambassador to Argentina
- In office August 27, 1960 – October 19, 1961
- President: Dwight D. Eisenhower
- Preceded by: Willard L. Beaulac
- Succeeded by: Robert M. McClintock

Personal details
- Born: February 13, 1912 Brownwood, Texas, U.S.
- Died: December 6, 2010 (aged 98) Austin, Texas, U.S.
- Spouse: Billy Ruth Young
- Education: Southern Methodist University; University of Texas at Austin
- Profession: Diplomat

Roy Richard Rubottom Jr. (February 13, 1912 – December 6, 2010) was an American diplomat, most notable for being Assistant Secretary of State for Inter-American Affairs from 1957 to 1960, a post in which he played a major role in engineering the United States' response to the Cuban Revolution.

== Biography ==
=== Early years (1912–1947) ===
Rubottom was born in Brownwood, Texas, on February 13, 1912. His parents ran a boarding house. He was educated at Southern Methodist University, graduating in 1933. There he was a member of the Lambda Chi Alpha fraternity and in 1933, he became the fraternity's seventh full-time traveling secretary (educational leadership consultant) from 1933 to 1935. In 1937, he became dean of student life at the University of Texas at Austin. He married a student, Billy Ruth Young of Corsicana, Texas, in 1938, and together the couple had three children: a daughter, Eleanor Ann (Rubottom) Odden and two sons, Frank Richard Rubottom and John William Rubottom. During his time at the University of Texas, he also did graduate level studies from 1939 to 1941. In fall 1941, Rubottom joined the United States Navy with the rank of Lieutenant (junior grade). He was initially posted to New Orleans, where he was responsible for recruiting and training. After serving additional assignments in Manzanillo, Colima, Mexico and Asunción, Paraguay, he left the Navy in 1946, having achieved the rank of Commander.

=== Career in the Foreign Service (1947–1957) ===
Rubottom joined the United States Foreign Service in 1947. His first posting as a Foreign Service Officer was Second Secretary in Bogotá. He then moved to the United States Department of State in Washington, D.C., to become Officer-in-Charge of Mexican Affairs, and later Director of the Office of Middle American Affairs. He then returned to the field, serving in the United States Embassy in Madrid, first as Counselor, then as Director of the United States Operations Mission in Spain. In 1956, he returned to Washington, D.C., and became Deputy Assistant Secretary of State for Inter-American Affairs.

=== Assistant Secretary of State for Inter-American Affairs (1957–1960) ===
Upon the resignation of Henry F. Holland in September 1956, Rubottom took over as Acting Assistant Secretary of State for Inter-American Affairs. After many months, Secretary of State John Foster Dulles chose to nominate Rubottom for the post, which was confirmed in the Senate after lengthy confirmation hearings. Rubottom served in the capacity of Assistant Secretary of State for Inter-American Affairs from June 18, 1957, until August 27, 1960. Pursuing the Eisenhower Administration's Cold War policy of containment (as expressed in the Eisenhower Doctrine), Rubottom's chief aim as Assistant Secretary was to halt the spread of Communism in Latin America. In January 1958, Rubottom gave an important speech entitled "Communism in the Americas" in which he warned that agents of the Soviet Union were increasingly active in Latin America and that the U.S. needed to be prepared to support anti-Communist forces in Latin America.

The Cuban Revolution of 1959 occurred while Rubottom was Assistant Secretary. Rubottom initially believed that Castro was not a Communist, and in April 1959, the State Department greeted Castro as a "distinguished leader". At a January 14, 1960, meeting of the United States National Security Council, Rubottom explained how the State Department's policy evolved from having a positive image of Fidel Castro in early 1959 through to deciding Castro needed to be assassinated by the end of the year:

The period from January to March might be characterized as the honeymoon period of the Castro government. In April a downward trend in US-Cuban relations had been evident. . . . In June we had reached the decision that it was not possible to achieve our objectives with Castro in power and had agreed to undertake the program referred to by Mr. Merchant.

In July and August we had been busy drawing up a program to replace Castro. Some American companies, however, reported to us during this time that they were making some progress in negotiations, a factor that caused us to slow the implementation of our program. The hope expressed by these companies did not materialize. October was a period of clarification. . . . On 31 October in agreement with Central Intelligence Agency, the Department had recommended to the President approval of a program along the lines referred to by Mr. Merchant.

The approved program authorized us to support elements in Cuba opposed to the Castro government while making Castro's downfall seem to be the result of his own mistakes.

In addition to discussions about assassinating Castro, Rubottom was involved in discussions about the United States embargo against Cuba, which began in October 1960, two months after Rubottom left the State Department.

As Assistant Secretary, Rubottom was supportive of moderates in the Dominican Republic who sought the overthrow of dictator Rafael Trujillo, advising the National Security Council in March 1960 that an assassination attempt would occur soon. He was in contact with CIA officials about orchestrating the assassination, which eventually occurred in May 1961.

=== Later years (since 1960) ===
President Eisenhower then nominated Rubottom as United States Ambassador to Argentina; Ambassador Rubottom presented his credentials to the Argentinian government on October 20, 1960, and served in that post for one year, leaving Argentina on October 19, 1961.

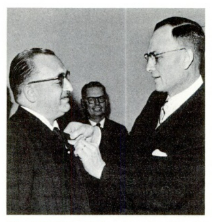
Roy R. Rubottom, Jr (right), then Ambassador to Argentina, pins a 20-year Length of Service pin on Celestino del Castillo

Rubottom spent 1961 to 1964 as a faculty adviser at the Naval War College. He then returned to his alma mater, Southern Methodist University, as Vice President of Life (1964–1967); Vice President of Administration (1967–1970); and Vice President of Planning (1970–1971). He then spent two years as president of the University of the Americas before retiring in 1973.

In retirement, Rubottom lived in Dallas. Rubottom and his wife were active members of the Highland Park United Methodist Church. Rubottom was also active in the Boy Scouts of America, serving as U.S. delegate to the World Scout Conference on four occasions and being awarded the Silver Buffalo Award in 1993. Rubottom also remained active in Lambda Chi Alpha, serving on the Grand High Zeta from 1968 to 1976 and as a director of the Educational Foundation Board from 1977 to 1996 (and as its chairman from 1985 to 1989). The fraternity awarded Rubottom its Order of Achievement in 1988. After over 40 years living in Dallas, the Rubottoms moved to Austin in 2006. Rubottom's wife, Billy Ruth, died on January 4, 2008. Roy Richard Rubottom died on December 6, 2010, in Austin, Texas.

== Awards ==
Rubottom was awarded the H. Neil Mallon Award by the World Affairs Council in 1991. The H. Neil Mallon Award, hosted by the World Affair Council of Dallas/ Fort Worth, is presented annually to individuals who have excelled at promoting the international focus of North Texas. The prestigious Mallon Award is named after the Council’s founder and is presented annually to individuals who have excelled in promoting our region’s international profile. Funds raised from this event support the World Affair Council’s public and education programming, international exchanges, and diplomatic services.

== Publications by Roy R. Rubottom Jr. ==
- Roy R. Rubottom, Jr., "Communism in the Americas", Department of State Bulletin, Feb. 3, 1958.
- Roy R. Rubottom Jr., "Toward Better Understanding between United States and Latin America," Annals of the American Academy of Political and Social Science, Vol. 330, Whither American Foreign Policy? (Jul. 1960), pp. 116–123.
- Roy R. Rubottom Jr., "The Goals of United States Policy in Latin America", Annals of the American Academy of Political and Social Science, Vol. 342, American Foreign Policy Challenged (Jul., 1962), pp. 30–41.

== Photographs of Roy R. Rubottom Jr. ==
- From Getty Images
- From Life magazine

Government offices
Preceded by Henry F. Holland	Assistant Secretary of State for Inter-American Affairs; June 18, 1957 – August 27, 1960	Succeeded by Thomas C. Mann
Diplomatic posts
Preceded by Willard L. Beaulac	United States Ambassador to Argentina; October 20, 1960 – October 19, 1961	Succeeded by Robert McClintock
