= William D. Rogers =

American lawyer

William Dill Rogers
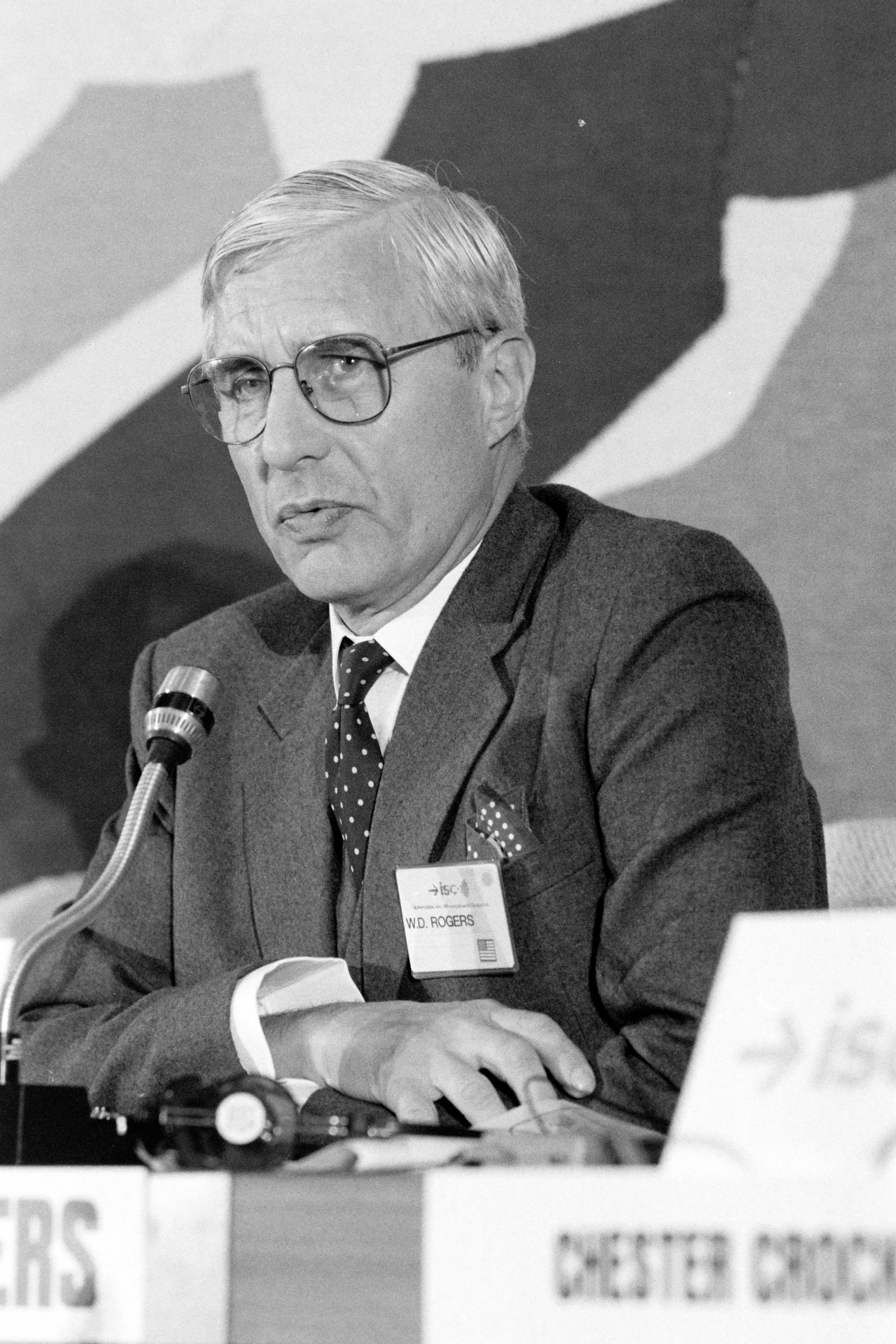

16th Assistant Secretary of State for Inter-American Affairs
- In office October 7, 1974 – June 18, 1976
- Preceded by: Jack B. Kubisch
- Succeeded by: Harry W. Shlaudeman

7th Under Secretary of State for Economic Affairs
- In office June 18, 1976 – December 31, 1976
- Preceded by: Charles W. Robinson
- Succeeded by: Richard N. Cooper

Personal details
- Born: May 12, 1927 Wilmington, Delaware, U.S.
- Died: September 22, 2007 (aged 80) Upperville, Virginia, U.S.
- Party: Democratic
- Spouse: Suzanne Rochford "Suki" Rogers
- Children: Dr. William D. Rogers Jr. Daniel R. Rogers
- Education: Princeton University (BA); Yale University (LLB)
- Occupation: Lawyer

William Dill Rogers (May 12, 1927 in Wilmington, Delaware – September 22, 2007 in Upperville, Virginia) was an American lawyer. He served as U.S. Assistant Secretary of State for Inter-American Affairs (October 1974 – June 1976) and Undersecretary of State for Economic Affairs (June 1976–January 1977) under then-Secretary of State Henry Kissinger in the administration of President Gerald Ford. He was amongst the founding members in 1982, and from 2004 until his death was vice chairman, of Kissinger's consulting firm Kissinger Associates.

In the 1950s, Rogers joined the law firm of Arnold, Fortas, & Porter (now Arnold & Porter) and was involved in the successful legal defense of Owen Lattimore, the scholar of East Asia accused of being a key Soviet spy.

== Personal ==
Rogers was no relation to President Richard M. Nixon's Secretary of State William P. Rogers.

Rogers majored in international affairs at Princeton University and graduated from Yale Law School in 1951.

He died in Upperville, Virginia, on September 22, 2007, at the age of 80. Rogers was survived by his wife of 56 years, Suzanne Rochford "Suki" Rogers, two sons, Dr. William D. Rogers Jr. and Daniel R. Rogers, a sister, and four grandchildren.

== Selected publications ==
- Charles E. Clark, William D. Rogers, "The New Judiciary Act of Puerto Rico: A Definitive Court Reorganization", 61 Yale Law Journal, 1147, No. 7, Nov. 1952.
- Rogers, William D. (1967). The Twilight Struggle: The Alliance for Progress and the Politics of Development in Latin America. New York: Random House – via Internet Archive.
- William D. Rogers, "United States Investment in Latin America: A Critical Appraisal, 11 Virginia Journal of International Law 246 (1970-71).
- William D. Rogers, "The Constitutionality of the Cambodian Incursion", American Journal of International Law, vol. 65, No. 1, Jan. 1971, at 26, at JSTOR database.
- William D. Rogers, "Of Missionaries, Fanatics, and Lawyers: Some Thoughts on Investment Disputes in the Americas", American Journal of International Law, vol. 72, No. 1, (Jan. 1978), at 1-16. at JSTOR database
- William D. Rogers, "The United States and Latin America", Foreign Affairs, vol. 63, No. 3, 1984, at 560-80.
- Louis Henkin, Michael J. Glennon, William D. Rogers eds., (1990) Foreign Affairs and the U.S. Constitution, Irvington on Hudson, New York: Transnational Publishers.
- William D. Rogers, ""Power" to "Law": It's Not as Bad as All That", 23 Wisconsin International Law Journal, 1, at 39-47.
- William D. Rogers, "Fleeing the Chilean Coup: The Debate of U.S. Complicity", International Affairs, Jan.-Feb. 2004.
- William D. Rogers, "Why Keep a Lonely Stance on Cuba?", Los Angeles Times, Nov. 13, 1998.

== See also ==
- List of law clerks for the sixth seat of the Supreme Court of the United States

== Notes ==
Government offices
Preceded by Jack B. Kubisch	Assistant Secretary of State for Inter-American Affairs; October 7, 1974 – June 18, 1976	Succeeded by Harry W. Shlaudeman
Preceded by Charles W. Robinson	Under Secretary of State for Economic Affairs; June 18, 1976 – December 31, 1976	Succeeded by Richard N. Cooper
