= Lincoln Gordon =

U.S. Ambassador to Brazil and university president

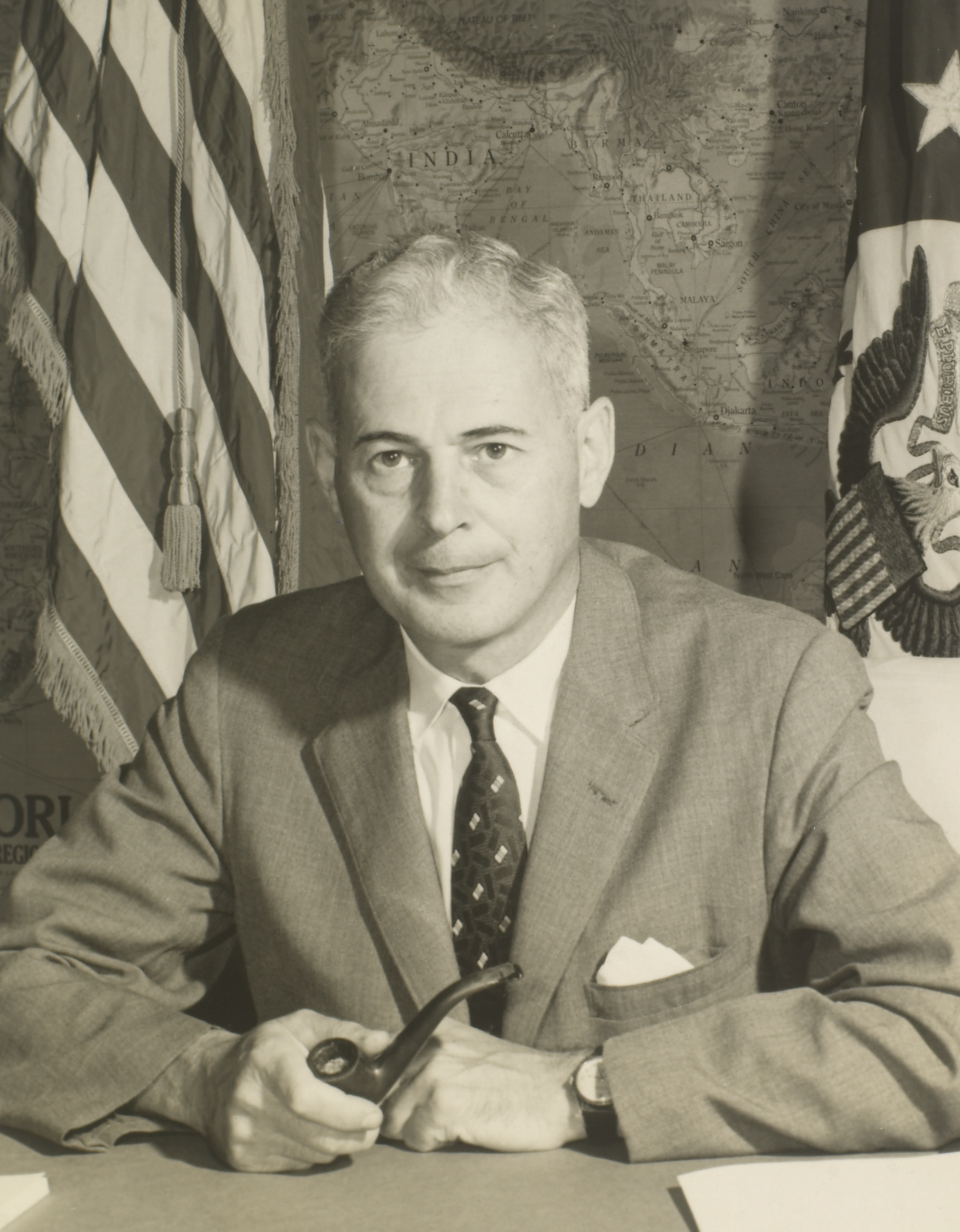

United States Ambassador to Brazil
- In office 9 October 1961 – 25 February 1966
- President: John F. Kennedy; Lyndon B. Johnson
- Preceded by: John M. Cabot
- Succeeded by: John W. Tuthill

12th Assistant Secretary of State for Inter-American Affairs
- In office March 9, 1966 – June 30, 1967
- Preceded by: Jack Hood Vaughn
- Succeeded by: Covey T. Oliver

Personal details
- Born: September 10, 1913 New York City, New York, U.S.
- Died: December 19, 2009 (aged 96) Mitchellville, Maryland, U.S.
- Party: Democratic
- Spouse: Allison Gordon (née Wright)
- Children: Sally (née Anne), Robert, Hugh, Amy
- Education: Harvard University, Oxford University
- Profession: Academic and diplomat

Abraham Lincoln Gordon (September 10, 1913 – December 19, 2009) was the 9th President of the Johns Hopkins University (1967–1971) and a United States Ambassador to Brazil (1961–1966). Gordon had a career both in government and in academia, becoming a Professor of International Economic Relations at Harvard University in the 1950s, before turning his attention to foreign affairs. Gordon had a career in business after his resignation as president of Johns Hopkins University, but remained active at institutions such as the Brookings Institution until his death.

== Early life ==
Born September 10, 1913 in New York City, Gordon attended the Ethical Culture Fieldston School in Riverdale, and later attended Harvard University. As an undergraduate at Harvard, Gordon was involved with the university's glee club.

While he was a student at Harvard, Gordon met his future wife, Allison Wright, at a film exhibition in Dunster House. They married in 1937.

He received a BA from Harvard in 1933. He received a DPhil from Oxford University as a Rhodes Scholar in 1936.

== Career in government (1944–67) ==
Gordon was program vice-chairman of the War Production Board from 1944 to 1945. He started in the Bureau of Research and Statistics of the War Production Board before joining the staff of the Requirements Committee, helping design the Controlled Materials Plan. This Plan regulated the conservation and allocation of critical materials such as steel, copper, zinc, and aluminum—materials that were scarce or were in danger of becoming so during World War II.

Gordon then worked for the US State Department as Director of the Marshall Plan Mission and Minister for Economic Affairs and at the United States embassy in London (1952–55). "To let Western Europe collapse for want of some dollars," Gordon has stated in regard to his role in the Marshall Plan, "would have been a tragedy. It would have been repeating the terrible mistake after World War I."

=== Brazil and Latin America (1960–67) ===
In 1967.

In 1960, Gordon helped develop the Alliance for Progress, an aid program designed to prevent Latin America from turning to revolution and socialism for economic progress.

In 1961, Time reported that Gordon has "become Kennedy's leading expert on Latin American economics. Gordon drew up the U.S. agenda for the July inter-American economic meeting approved last week by the Organization of American States."

Gordon served as U.S. Ambassador to Brazil (1961–66), where he played a major role for the support of the opposition against the government of President João Goulart and during the 1964 Brazilian coup d'état. On July 30, 1962, President Kennedy held a meeting with Gordon and U.S Latin American Advisor Richard N. Goodwin and urged for a "liaison" with Brazil's military. Gordon, who was eager to see the Goulart government overthrown, then began assisting the eventual 1964 Brazil coup and even recommended to "strengthen the spine" of Brazil's military. On March 27, 1964, he wrote a top secret cable to the US government, urging it to support the coup of Humberto de Alencar Castelo Branco with a "clandestine delivery of arms" and shipments of gas and oil, to possibly be supplemented by CIA covert operations. Gordon believed that Goulart, wanting to "seize dictatorial power", was working with the Brazilian Communist Party. Gordon wrote: "If our influence is to be brought to bear to help avert a major disaster here--which might make Brazil the China of the 1960s--this is where both I and all my senior advisors believe our support should be placed."

In the years after the coup, Gordon, Gordon's staff, and the CIA repeatedly denied that they had been involved and President Lyndon B. Johnson praised Gordon's service in Brazil as "a rare combination of experience and scholarship, idealism and practical judgment." In 1976, Gordon stated that the Johnson Administration "had been prepared to intervene militarily to prevent a leftist takeover of the government," but did not directly state that it had or had not intervened. Circa 2004 many documents were declassified and placed online at the GWU National Security Archive, indicating the involvement of Johnson, McNamara, Gordon, and others. In 2005 Stansfield Turner's book described the involvement of ITT Corporation president Harold Geneen and CIA director John McCone.

Afterward, Gordon became Assistant Secretary of State for Inter-American Affairs (1966–68) in Washington, D.C., and worked for the Alliance for Progress, which coordinated aid to Latin America.

== Career in academia ==
Gordon was a Professor of International Economic Relations at Harvard University in the 1950s, before turning his attention to foreign affairs.

=== Johns Hopkins University (1967–71) ===
He then served as president of Johns Hopkins University between 1967 and 1971. In 1970, following approval from the board of trustees in November 1969, he introduced coeducation in Johns Hopkins' full-time undergraduate program.

During his tenure, students and faculty briefly occupied the university's executive offices to protest against the Vietnam War despite the fact that Gordon had expressed opposition to the Vietnam War. He also took part in a campus-wide discussion over military recruiting on campus and whether the ROTC should have a place at Johns Hopkins.

During his tenure, the university was suffering a financial crisis, with an operating deficit of more than $4 million. The crisis caused Gordon to order budget cuts, which in turn caused faculty protests. Faculty were angered because while Gordon was cutting teaching positions, he was increasing the size of the university's administration. He also incurred student wrath when he re-wrote the student conduct code.

Gordon resigned in March 1971, following a vote of "no-confidence" by a committee of senior faculty, attributing his resignation to growing criticism from the university's faculty.[18] The New York Times stated that "Dr. Gordon's four years at Johns Hopkins were dogged by deteriorating finances, faculty complaints over pay and academic priorities, and students rebellious over the 'relevance' of their educations." Although Gordon had agreed to remain until an interim successor could be named, he left town abruptly, forcing the trustees to move quickly; they asked Gordon's predecessor, Milton S. Eisenhower, to return in an emergency capacity.

=== Later career ===
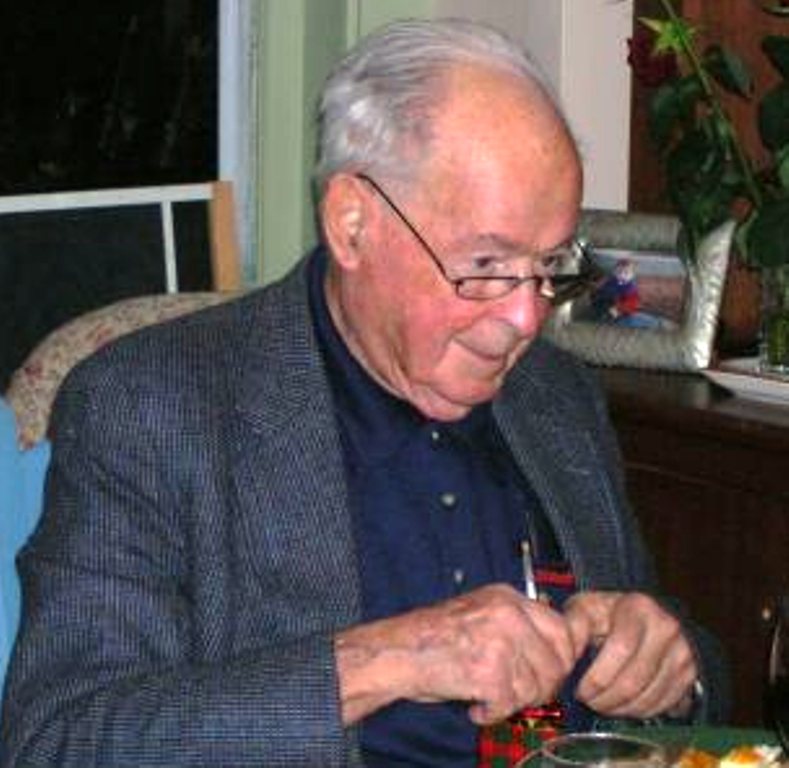
Lincoln Gordon in 2006.

Gordon was a fellow of the Woodrow Wilson International Center for Scholars at the Smithsonian Institution from 1972 to 1975.

In 1984, he became a scholar at the Brookings Institution (he was an active associate there until his death) and also became director at the Atlantic Council of the United States.

Gordon died at the age of 96 at Collington Episcopal Life Care, an assisted-living home, in Mitchellville, Maryland. He was survived by two sons, Robert and Hugh, and two daughters, Sally and Amy and seven grandchildren (including Kate Gordon); and three great-grandchildren.

Gordon died December 16, 2009.

== Books ==
- A New Deal for Latin America (1963)
- Growth Policies and the International Order (1979)
- Energy Strategies for Developing Nations (1981)
- Eroding Empire: Western Relations with Eastern Europe (1987)
- Brazil's Second Chance: En Route toward the First World (Brookings Institution Press, 2001).

Diplomatic posts
Preceded by John M. Cabot	United States Ambassador to Brazil; 19 October 1961 – 25 February 1966	Succeeded by John W. Tuthill
Government offices
Preceded by Jack Vaughn	Assistant Secretary of State for Inter-American Affairs; March 9, 1966 – June 30, 1967	Succeeded by Covey T. Oliver
Academic offices
Preceded by Milton S. Eisenhower	President of the Johns Hopkins University; July 1967 – March 1971	Succeeded by Milton S. Eisenhower
