= Robert J. McCloskey =

American diplomat

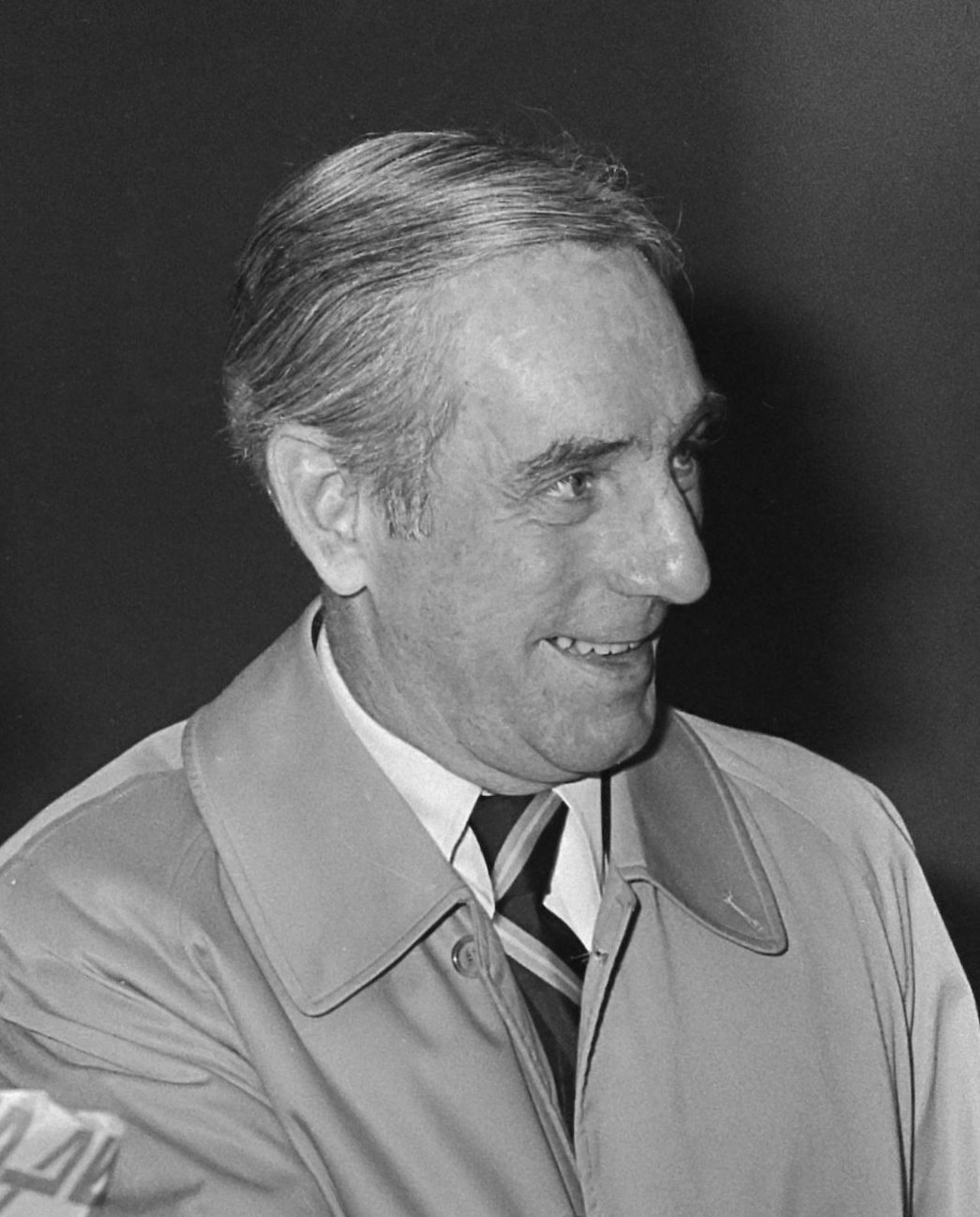
- McCloskey in 1978

54th United States Ambassador to the Netherlands
- In office October 22, 1976 – March 10, 1978
- President: Gerald Ford; Jimmy Carter
- Preceded by: Kingdon Gould Jr.
- Succeeded by: Geri M. Joseph

United States Ambassador to Cyprus
- In office May 20, 1973 – January 14, 1974
- Preceded by: David H. Popper
- Succeeded by: Rodger Davies

United States Ambassador to Greece
- In office 1978–1981
- President: Jimmy Carter
- Preceded by: Jack B. Kubisch
- Succeeded by: Monteagle Stearns

14th Assistant Secretary of State for Legislative Affairs
- In office February 21, 1975 – September 10, 1976
- Preceded by: A. Linwood Holton
- Succeeded by: Douglas J. Bennet

4th Spokesperson for the United States Department of State
- In office 1964–1973
- Preceded by: Lincoln White
- Succeeded by: Carl E. Bartch

Personal details
- Born: November 25, 1922 Philadelphia, Pennsylvania, U.S.
- Died: November 28, 1996 (aged 74) Chevy Chase, Maryland, U.S.

Robert James McCloskey (November 25, 1922 – November 28, 1996) was an American diplomat, ombudsman, and relief services executive.

Born in Philadelphia, Pennsylvania, the son of Thomas McCloskey and Anna Wallace, he was spokesperson for the United States Department of State from 1964 to 1973 but after a short stint (June 20, 1973, to January 14, 1974) as United States Ambassador to Cyprus, he was asked to return to his old job as spokesperson.

== Career ==
From February 21, 1975, to September 10, 1976, he served as Assistant Secretary of State for Congressional Relations. He later served as United States Ambassador to the Netherlands and to Greece. His government career was followed by a stint as ombudsman at the Washington Post, then as senior vice president of International Catholic Relief Services.

== Family ==
He married Anne Taylor Phelan on July 8, 1961. They had two daughters, Lisa and Andre. He died of leukemia in 1996 in Chevy Chase, Maryland at age 74.

Diplomatic posts
Preceded by David H. Popper	United States Ambassador to Cyprus; 1973–1974	Succeeded by Rodger P. Davies
Preceded by Kingdon Gould Jr.	United States Ambassador to the Netherlands; 1976–1978	Succeeded by Geri M. Joseph
Preceded by Jack Bloom Kubisch	United States Ambassador to Greece; 1978–1981	Succeeded by Monteagle Stearns
Government offices
Preceded by A. Linwood Holton Jr.	Assistant Secretary of State for Legislative Affairs; February 21, 1975 – September 10, 1976	Succeeded by Douglas J. Bennet
