= Peter J. Brennan =

American politician (1918–1996)

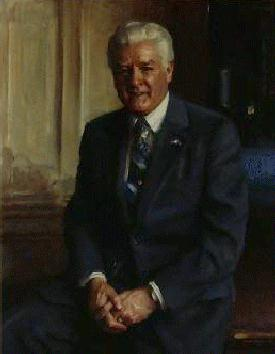
- Portrait by Everett Kinstler

13th United States Secretary of Labor
- In office February 2, 1973 – March 15, 1975
- President: Richard Nixon; Gerald Ford
- Preceded by: James Day Hodgson
- Succeeded by: John Thomas Dunlop

Personal details
- Born: Peter Joseph Brennan; May 24, 1918 New York City, U.S.
- Died: October 2, 1996 (aged 78) Massapequa, New York, U.S.
- Party: Democratic
- Spouse: Josephine Brickley
- Children: 3
- Education: City University of New York, City College (BS)

Military service
- Allegiance: United States
- Branch/service: United States Navy
- Battles/wars: World War II

Peter Joseph Brennan (May 24, 1918 – October 2, 1996) was an American labor activist and politician who served as United States Secretary of Labor from February 2, 1973, until March 15, 1975, in the administrations of Presidents Nixon and Ford. Brennan had previously been the president of both the Building and Construction Trades Council of Greater New York and the Building and Construction Trades Council of New York, and he returned to the former position after leaving the Ford administration. He was a strong opponent of affirmative action measures to increase the number of minority construction workers. After organizing a demonstration in support of the Nixon administration that turned into the Hard Hat Riot of May 8, 1970, where construction workers violently attacked student anti-war protesters, Brennan was wooed by the Nixon administration as a potential supporter in the 1972 presidential election. His work for Nixon in that election was crucial in increasing the vote for Nixon in New York and in the union movement.

== Early life ==
Brennan was born in New York City in 1918. His father was an ironworker who died from influenza. He graduated from Commerce High School, then received a B.S. degree in business administration from the City College of New York. While in college, he became an apprentice painter and joined Local 1456 of the Painter's Union.

After the US entered World War II, Brennan enlisted in the Navy, serving as a chief petty officer aboard a submarine home ported in Guam. Brennan's career as a union official started when he was elected business manager of Local 1456 in 1947. In 1951, he became the director of the New York Building Trades Council's Maintenance Division.

Brennan married the former Josephine Brickley in 1940, (she died in 1987). The couple had one son, Peter Joseph Brennan, Jr., and two daughters, Joan Brennan and Peggy Brennan.

Brennan was elected president of the Building and Construction Trades Council of Greater New York in 1957 and president of the Building and Construction Trades Council of New York. He also served as the vice president of the New York City Central Labor Council and the New York State AFL-CIO. These positions were influential both in the labour movement and politically. The Construction Trades Council represented 250,000 members from 18 locals and had close ties to New York Governor Nelson Rockefeller and leading politicians in New York City. During the 1960s, these unions were strong supporters of the Democrats and delivered strong voter turnout for John F. Kennedy, Lyndon Johnson and Hubert Humphrey.

=== Affirmative action ===
John Lindsay was elected Mayor of New York City in 1965 as a liberal Republican pledging to take on special interests, including the building and construction unions. In the late 1960s, a diverse coalition of business leaders, construction companies, civil rights activists, reformers and the media wanted to open up opportunities for minorities. A study by the New York City Commission on Human Rights in 1967 found that minority membership in the six most highly skilled building trades was only 2 percent and had not changed since 1960. The reform coalition thought the low entry into the building trades increased building costs above the market rate and cost New York City millions of dollars in increased costs.

In 1968, the Lindsay administration issued Executive Order 1971, which required city contractors to sign a non-discriminatory hiring action plan and develop affirmative action plans. If the contractors did not comply with the executive order, they could not bid for city work. Brennan was strongly opposed and promised to take action to have the order rescinded.

The Nixon Administration, under Labor Secretary George P. Shultz, announced the Philadelphia Plan in the summer of 1969 to increase minority membership of skilled building trades to twenty per cent within five years. Brennan and the skilled labor unions were determined to stop the introduction of such a system. They persuaded George Meany, President of the AFL-CIO and a former plumbing union official in New York City, to sponsor Congressional and legal challenges to the plans, but these efforts failed.

In February 1970, the Labor Department announced that it would support local construction industry affirmative action hiring plans provided that they were consistent with the Philadelphia Plan. Brennan was having a great deal of trouble persuading either the Department of Labor or the Lindsay administration to his way of thinking. The Lindsay administration stated that it wanted 4,000 minority trainees as part of the plan, but Brennan wanted no more than 1,000 trainees. Schultz warned labor leaders that the federal government would implement the Philadelphia Plan in 18 cities if suitable local plans were not implemented quickly.

=== Hard Hat Riot ===
On May 4, 1970, four students were shot dead at Kent State University in Ohio while protesting the Vietnam War and the incursion into Cambodia. As a show of sympathy for the dead students, Mayor Lindsay ordered all flags at City Hall to be flown at half mast the same day.

Brennan organized a rally of construction workers to show support for Nixon's Vietnam policies and American soldiers fighting in Vietnam. At 7:30 a.m. on May 8, several hundred anti-war protesters (most of them high school and college students) began holding a memorial at Broad and Wall Streets for the four dead students at Kent State. By late morning, the protesters—now numbering more than a thousand—were demanding an end to the war in Vietnam and Cambodia, the release of "political prisoners" in the U.S., and an end to military-related research on all university campuses. At five minutes to noon, about 200 construction workers converged on the student rally at Federal Hall National Memorial from four directions. At first, the construction workers only pushed but did not break the thin line of police. After just two minutes, however, the workers broke through the police line and began chasing students through the streets. The workers selected those with the longest hair and swatted them with their hard hats. Attorneys, bankers and investment analysts from nearby Wall Street investment firms tried to protect many of the students but were themselves attacked. Onlookers reported that the police stood by and did nothing. A postal worker rushed onto the roof of City Hall and raised the American flag to full mast. When city workers lowered the flag to half-mast, the construction workers stormed City Hall, overwhelming the police. Deputy Mayor Richard Aurelio, fearing the building would be overrun by the mob, ordered city workers to raise the flag back to full mast. The construction workers then ripped the Red Cross and Episcopal Church flags down from a flag pole at Trinity Church. They then stormed two buildings at nearby Pace University, breaking windows with clubs and crowbars and beating students. More than 70 people were injured, including four policemen. Six people were arrested. President Nixon held an emergency press conference to defuse the situation before tens of thousands of students arrived in Washington, D.C., for a protest rally on May 9. Many organizations claim that Peter Brennan provoked the construction workers into action. At least one eyewitness described two men in grey suits using hand signals to direct the construction workers during the riot The disturbances on May 8 became known as the Hard Hat Riot.

Brennan led a second rally on May 20 in which more than 20,000 construction workers announced their support for Nixon's Southeast Asia policies.

=== Support for Nixon in 1972 ===
On May 26, 1970, Brennan led a delegation of 22 union leaders to meet Nixon and to present him with a hardhat. Charles Colson was put in charge of developing a strategy to win union support for Nixon in the 1972 presidential election. Brennan was identified as a friendly leader of the labor movement for cultivation.

Colson wanted to recruit a senior trade unionist to serve in the administration. Colson wrote in a memo to H.R. Haldeman, "If we can follow through on the good start we have, the labor vote can be ours in 1972." That would be a critical blow to the Democratic nominee for President, as labor was normally an essential part of the Democrat coalition.

Brennan was granted a private audience with Nixon on Labor Day when 70 labor leaders from across the US were invited to a Labor Day dinner. Shortly after, Governor Rockefeller, Mayor Lindsay and Brennan announced the New York Planning for Training, which specified a goal of 800 trainees, rather than the 4,000 trainees wanted by Lindsay.

The labor movement was angered in 1971 when the Nixon administration introduced wage controls as part of a package to try to control inflation and suspended the Davis-Bacon Act, which provides that construction workers on federal projects receive union wages. Brennan accused the administration of treating the construction workers as "patsies." Brennan called himself a Democrat but often supported Republicans for office. Despite the setback on Davis-Bacon, Brennan met Nixon again in April 1971 and offered to support his bid for re-election in return for the federal government adopting the New York Plan.

Brennan delivered on his word for Nixon in 1972. After a meeting with construction unions in 1972, Nixon wrote in his diary of labor leaders having "character and guts and a bit of patriotism." Labor leadership were also alienated by the Democratic candidate George McGovern and his leftist views on domestic policies. On July 19, the AFL-CIO refused to endorse McGovern as President. Meany told Nixon in late July that he was going to win in a landslide and that he was not going to waste AFL-CIO money supporting McGovern's candidacy.

Nixon duly won in a landslide, carrying New York easily with the support of the vast majority of building and construction workers in that state, who, four years, earlier had voted overwhelmingly for Hubert Humphrey. In return for his support, Brennan succeeded in having an audit of the New York Plan deferred until after the election.

== Political life ==
President Nixon appointed Peter Brennan as his Labor Secretary as a reward for his support and to try to consolidate his support amongst union members. Colson recruited Brennan for the post of Labor Secretary days after the November election. In a three-hour meeting, Colson told Brennan that he would have to defend unpopular administration policies, abide by administration policy decisions, and keep Labor Department officials from investigating Teamsters president Frank Fitzsimmons, who had played a critical role in securing limited labor support for Nixon. Colson told Brennan that Nixon would appoint the Under Secretary and Assistant Secretary, but Brennan would have a free hand in appointing all other political positions if they provided unwavering support for administration policies. The Labor Department, Colson said, was "infested" with disloyal appointees and Brennan was to "clean house." Brennan agreed to every condition. The Senate confirmed him, and Brennan assumed office on February 2, 1973.

American labor leaders were initially happy with Brennan's appointment. He was an outspoken advocate for a higher minimum wage, expanding the minimum wage to cover more workers, significant improvement in unemployment benefits, enhanced workplace safety, and worker training programs. But once in office, Brennan promoted a plan to raise the minimum wages in small increments over four years with no increase in the number of covered workers. George Meany, the president of the AFL-CIO, was outraged and rarely mentioned Brennan's name or spoke to him again during Brennan's tenure in office.

Under Brennan, the Nixon administration supported and Congress passed legislation to protect worker pensions, expand workplace rights of the disabled, improve enforcement of occupational safety and health laws, and improve benefits for workers left jobless by changes in international trade.

Brennan also stalled on affirmative action plans in the building industry, especially the New York Plan. By August 1972, only 534 minority workers had received training, and only 34 had received union cards under the New York Plan. In 1973, John Lindsay, who had become a Democrat, withdrew from the New York Plan and set a new objective to increase minority representation in the building trades to 25%.

In response, Brennan issued a directive forbidding local authorities from exceeding the requirements of approved hometown plans and required states and cities to obtain the approval of the Secretary of Labor for plans affecting federal contracts. Furthermore, he froze federal funding for all building work in New York City until the city returned to the New York Plan. The federal government won the ensuing legal battle, and New York City's fiscal crisis meant that it had to abandon its affirmative action plans.

The Watergate crisis meant that the Nixon administration was unable to do much other than focus on survival. Brennan was unable to develop new initiatives during Nixon's truncated second term.

President Gerald Ford instituted a general housecleaning among Cabinet officers, and asked Brennan to resign. Brennan did so on February 6, 1975, leaving in March. Ford offered to nominate Brennan to be ambassador to Ireland, but Brennan declined the offer.

== Later years ==
Peter Brennan returned to his union position in March 1975 and retired in 1992. Brennan succeeded in negotiating wages rises and expanding training and job opportunities. Civil rights advocates criticized him for not having taken enough action against the discrimination of Black and Hispanic workers by the building unions; Brennan defended himself arguing that it had not been possible to act faster due to the resistance of the traditionally white construction trades.

Brennan died of lymphatic cancer on October 2, 1996, at his daughter's home in Massapequa, New York. He was interred in Saint Charles Cemetery in Farmingdale, Long Island, New York.

== See also ==
- Building and Construction Trades Department, AFL-CIO

== Notes ==
Political offices
Preceded by James Day Hodgson	U.S. Secretary of Labor; Served under: Richard Nixon, Gerald Ford; 1973—1975	Succeeded by John T. Dunlop
