= David Lodge (biologist) =

American biologist (born 1957)

- Born: April 1, 1957 (age 69)
- Education: Sewanee: The University of the South; Oxford University
- Known for: invasive species; ecological forecasting
- Awards: Phi Beta Kappa (1978); Rhodes Scholar (1979); Fulbright Scholar, US DoS (1998); Fellow, AAAS (2010); Jefferson Science Fellowship (2014); Fellow, ESA (2016)
- Scientific career
- Fields: Biology
- Workplaces: University of Wisconsin–Madison; University of Notre Dame; United States Department of State; Cornell University

David Lodge (born April 1, 1957) is an American biologist. He is best known for his work on the interrelated problems of invasive species, land use, and climate change, and their synergistic impacts on water resources.

== Biography ==
Lodge is a 1975 graduate of Sewanee Academy (now St. Andrew's-Sewanee School) and received his B.S., summa cum laude, in 1979 from Sewanee: The University of the South. As a Rhodes Scholar, he completed his D.Phil. from Oxford University in 1982. From 1983 to 1985, he taught at the University of Wisconsin–Madison. From 1985 to 2016, he served on the faculty of the University of Notre Dame as a professor of biology, the director of the Notre Dame Center for Aquatic Conservation, and the director of the Notre Dame Environmental Change Initiative. From 2011 to 2016, Lodge was the Ludmilla F., Stephen J., and Robert T. Galla Professor of Biological Sciences. Since May 2016, Lodge has been a member of the faculty of Cornell University where he holds the Francis J. DiSalvo Directorship of the David R. Atkinson Center for a Sustainable Future.

Lodge is a fellow of the American Association for the Advancement of Science and of the Ecological Society of America. He advocates for scientific approaches to manage invasive species in lake ecosystems. In 2014, Lodge served as a Jefferson Science fellow in the Office of Ocean and Polar Affairs at the United States Department of State.
