= Joseph M. Young =

American diplomat

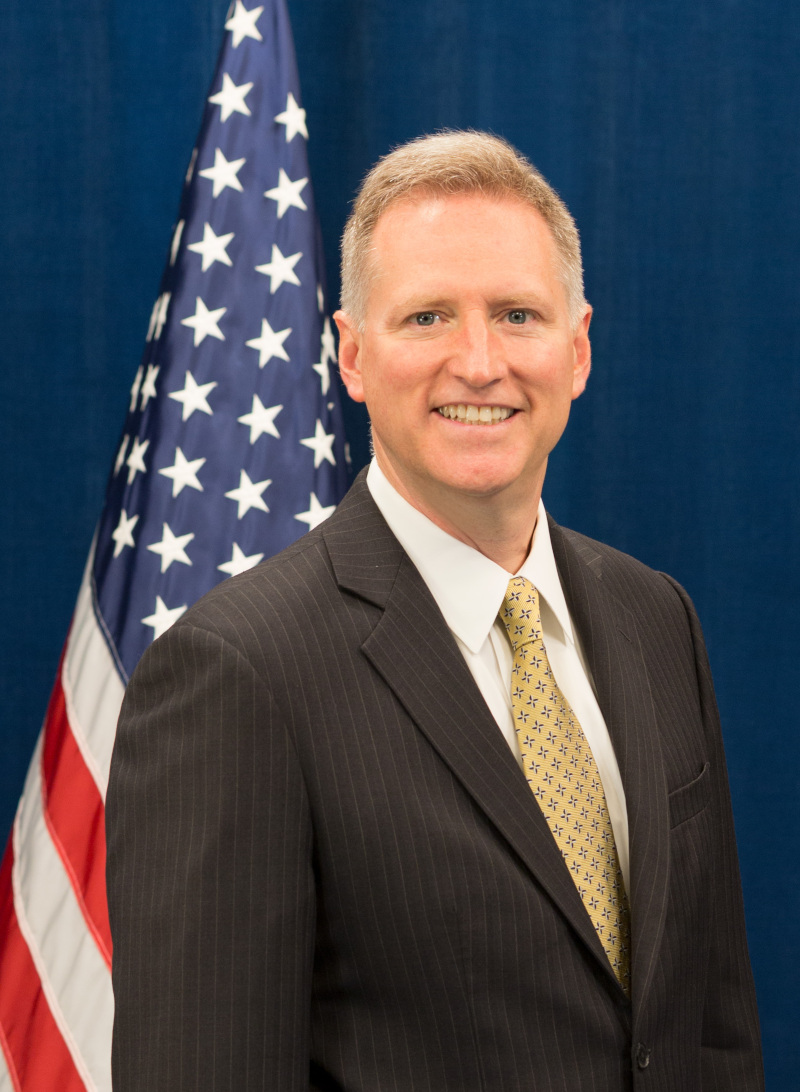

United States Ambassador to Japan
- Acting
- In office February 9, 2025 – April 18, 2025
- President: Donald Trump
- Preceded by: Rahm Emanuel
- Succeeded by: George Edward Glass
- In office July 22, 2019 – June 17, 2021
- President: Donald Trump; Joe Biden
- Preceded by: Bill Hagerty
- Succeeded by: Nicholas M. Hill (Acting)

Personal details
- Children: 3
- Education: Collegio Borromeo (BA); Georgetown University (MS)

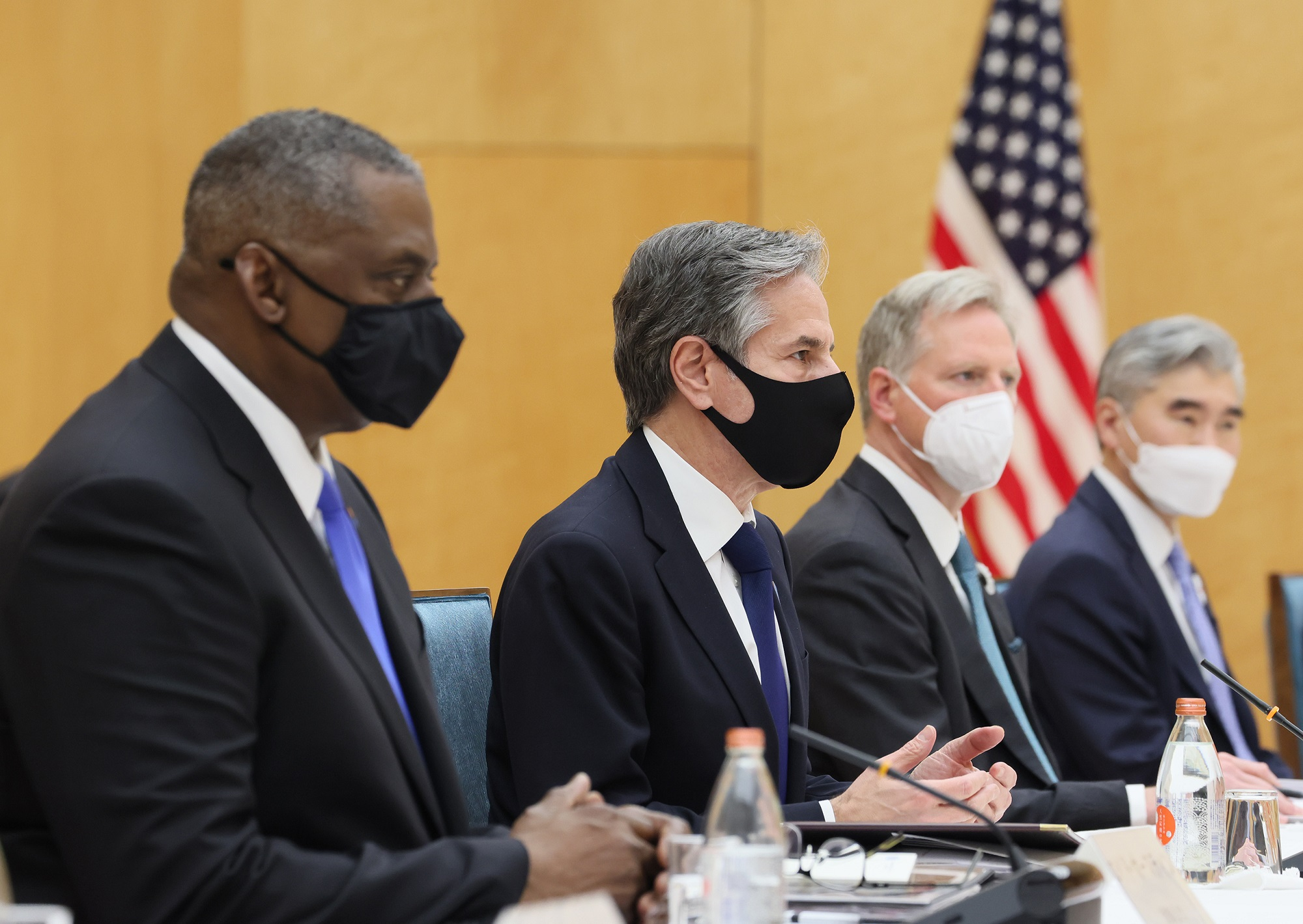
Joseph Young with Secretary of State Tony Blinken and General Lloyd Austin in Japan, March 2021

Joseph M. Young is an American diplomat who served as the chargé d'affaires ad interim at the U.S. Embassy Tokyo from July 22, 2019, to June 17, 2021, after the resignation of Bill Hagerty. Young is a career member of the U.S. Foreign Service and served as the Deputy Chief of Mission at the U.S. Embassy in Tokyo from 2017 to 2019, and as the Director for Japanese Affairs at the United States Department of State from 2012 to 2014. He served at the second time Chargé d'affaires ad interim at the U.S. Embassy Tokyo from February 9 to April 18, 2025.

== Education ==
Young earned a bachelor's degree in classics at the Collegio Borromeo and a Master of Science in foreign service at the Georgetown University School of Foreign Service.

Diplomatic posts
Previous: Marc E. Knapper	Director for the Office of Japanese Affairs; Bureau of East Asian and Pacific Affairs; 2014–2017	Next: Julie J. Chung
Previous: Bill Hagerty as Ambassador	Chief of Mission; United States Embassy Tokyo; 2019–2021	Next: Nicholas M. Hill
