= Assistant Secretary of State for Western Hemisphere Affairs =

Position in the US Department of State

United States Assistant Secretary of State for Western Hemisphere Affairs
- Seal of the United States Department of State

- Flag of an Assistant Secretary of State

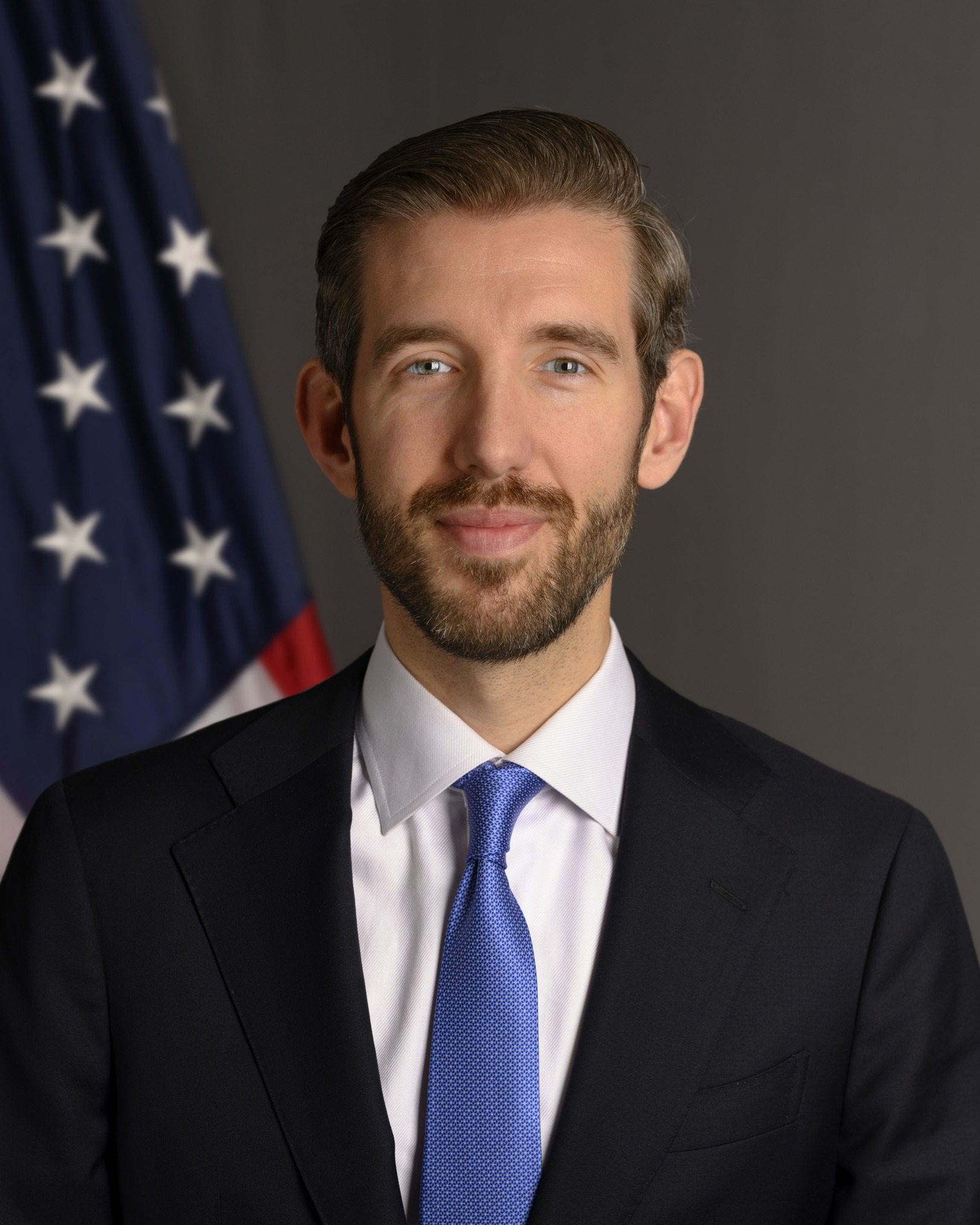
- Incumbent; Juan Pablo Segura since August 14, 2026
- Reports to: Under Secretary of State for Political Affairs
- Nominator: President of the United States
- Inaugural holder: Nelson Rockefeller
- Formation: 1944
- Website: Official website

The assistant secretary of state for Western Hemisphere affairs is the head of the Bureau of Western Hemisphere Affairs within the United States Department of State, the foreign affairs department of the United States federal government. The assistant secretary of state guides operation of the U.S. diplomatic establishment in the countries of the Western Hemisphere and advises the secretary of state and the under secretary for political affairs.

The Department of State created the position of Assistant Secretary of State for American Republic Affairs during the general reorganization of December 20, 1944, after Congress had authorized an increase in the number of Assistant Secretaries of State from four to six. This reorganization was the first to assign substantive designations to specific Assistant Secretary positions. The position was temporarily discontinued between June 1947 and June 1949, when American Republic Affairs were handled by an Assistant Secretary for Political Affairs.

The Department re-established the position in June 1949 after the Commission on Organization of the Executive Branch of Government recommended that certain offices be upgraded to bureau level and after Congress increased the number of Assistant Secretaries of State from six to ten. On October 3, 1949, the Department by administrative action changed the incumbent's designation to Assistant Secretary for Inter-American Affairs. The Department of State had first established a Division of Latin American Affairs in 1909.

== List of Assistant Secretaries of State for American Republic Affairs, 1944–1947 ==
| Image | Name | Assumed office | Left office | President served under |
|---|---|---|---|---|
| | Nelson Rockefeller | December 20, 1944 | August 17, 1945 | Franklin D. Roosevelt and Harry S. Truman |
| | Spruille Braden | October 29, 1945 | June 27, 1947 | Harry S. Truman |

== List of Assistant Secretaries of State for Inter-American Affairs, 1949–2000 ==
| Image | Name | Assumed office | Left office | President served under |
|---|---|---|---|---|
| | Edward G. Miller, Jr. | June 28, 1949 | December 31, 1952 | Harry S. Truman |
| | John M. Cabot | March 3, 1953 | March 1, 1954 | Dwight D. Eisenhower |
| | Henry F. Holland | March 2, 1954 | September 13, 1956 | Dwight D. Eisenhower |
| | Roy R. Rubottom, Jr. | June 18, 1957 | August 27, 1960 | Dwight D. Eisenhower |
| | Thomas C. Mann | August 28, 1960 | April 20, 1961 | Dwight D. Eisenhower and John F. Kennedy |
| | Wymberley D. Coerr (Acting) | April 20, 1961 | July 17, 1961 | John F. Kennedy |
| | Robert F. Woodward | July 17, 1961 | March 17, 1962 | John F. Kennedy |
| | Edwin M. Martin | May 18, 1962 | January 2, 1964 | John F. Kennedy and Lyndon B. Johnson |
| | Thomas C. Mann | January 3, 1964 | March 17, 1965 | Lyndon B. Johnson |
| | Jack Hood Vaughn | March 22, 1965 | February 28, 1966 | Lyndon B. Johnson |
| | Lincoln Gordon | March 9, 1966 | June 30, 1967 | Lyndon B. Johnson |
| | Covey T. Oliver | July 1, 1967 | December 31, 1968 | Lyndon B. Johnson |
| | Charles A. Meyer | April 2, 1969 | March 2, 1973 | Richard Nixon |
| | Jack B. Kubisch | May 29, 1973 | September 4, 1974 | Richard Nixon |
| | William D. Rogers | October 7, 1974 | June 18, 1976 | Gerald Ford |
| | Harry W. Shlaudeman | July 22, 1976 | March 14, 1977 | Gerald Ford |
| | Terence Todman | April 1, 1977 | June 27, 1978 | Jimmy Carter |
| | Viron P. Vaky | July 21, 1978 | November 30, 1979 | Jimmy Carter |
| | William G. Bowdler | January 4, 1980 | January 16, 1981 | Jimmy Carter |
| | Thomas O. Enders | June 23, 1981 | June 27, 1983 | Ronald Reagan |
| | Langhorne A. Motley | July 12, 1983 | July 3, 1985 | Ronald Reagan |
| | Elliott Abrams | July 17, 1985 | January 20, 1989 | Ronald Reagan |
| | Bernard W. Aronson | June 16, 1989 | July 2, 1993 | George H. W. Bush and Bill Clinton |
| | Alexander Watson | July 2, 1993 | March 29, 1996 | Bill Clinton |
| | Jeffrey Davidow | August 7, 1996 | July 6, 1998 | Bill Clinton |

== List of Assistant Secretaries of State for Western Hemisphere Affairs, 2000–present ==
| Image | Name | Assumed office | Left office | President served under |
|---|---|---|---|---|
| | Peter F. Romero | January 4, 2001 | June 4, 2001 | Bill Clinton and George W. Bush |
| | Otto Reich | January 11, 2002 | July 22, 2004 | George W. Bush |
| | Roger Noriega | July 31, 2004 | October 6, 2005 | George W. Bush |
| | Thomas A. Shannon, Jr. | October 17, 2005 | November 10, 2009 | George W. Bush and Barack Obama |
| | Arturo Valenzuela | November 10, 2009 | July 31, 2011 | Barack Obama |
| | Roberta S. Jacobson | July 31, 2011 | March 30, 2012 (acting) | Barack Obama |
| | Roberta S. Jacobson | March 30, 2012 | May 5, 2016 | Barack Obama |
| | Mari Carmen Aponte (Acting) | May 5, 2016 | January 20, 2017 | Barack Obama |
| | Francisco "Paco" Palmieri (Acting) | January 20, 2017 | October 15, 2018 | Donald Trump |
| | Kimberly Breier | October 15, 2018 | August 30, 2019 | Donald Trump |
| | Michael Kozak (Acting) | September 13, 2019 | January 20, 2021 | Donald Trump |
| | Julie J. Chung (Acting) | January 20, 2021 | August 3, 2021 | Joe Biden |
| | Ricardo Zúñiga (Acting) | August 3, 2021 | September 15, 2021 | Joe Biden |
| | Brian A. Nichols | September 15, 2021 | December 31, 2024 | Joe Biden |
| | Mark A. Wells (Acting) | January 1, 2025 | January 20, 2025 | Joe Biden |
| | Michael Kozak (Acting) | January 20, 2025 | August 14, 2026 | Donald Trump |
| | Juan Pablo Segura | August 14, 2026 | Present | Donald Trump |
