= Geri M. Joseph =

American journalist and diplomat (1923–2023)

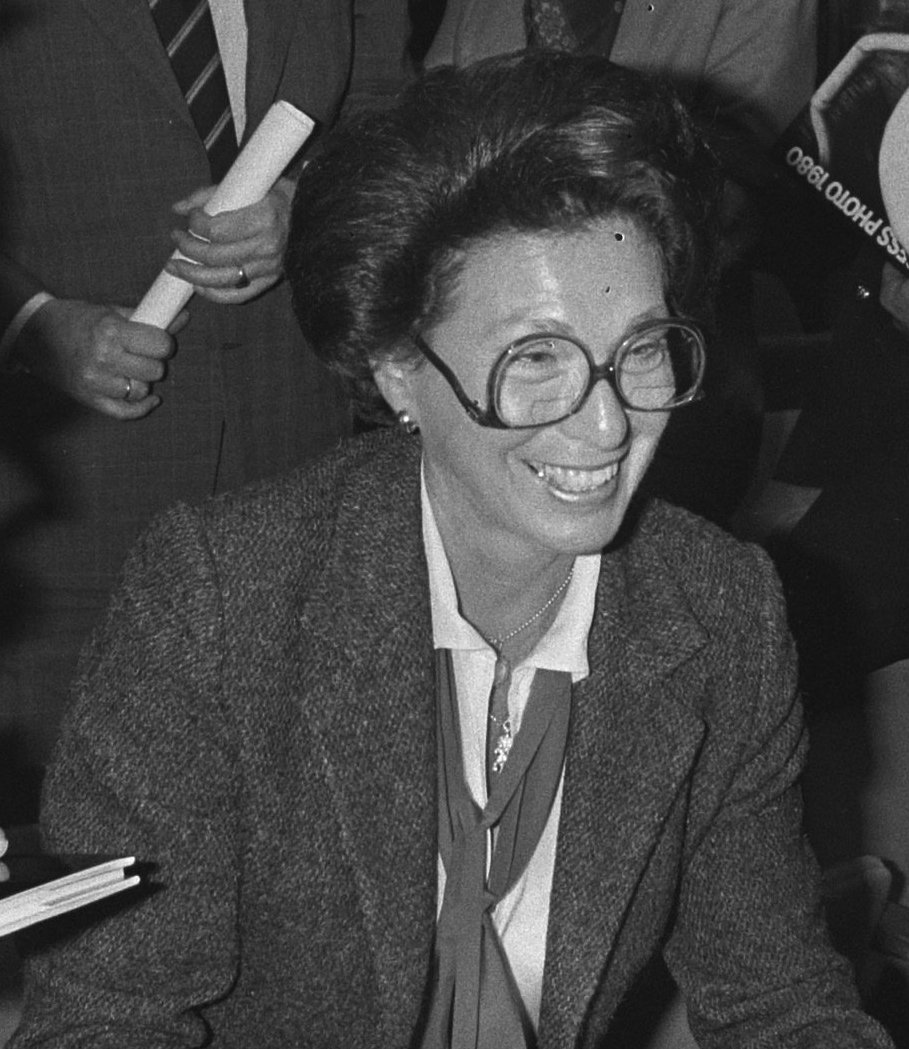
- Joseph in 1980

55th United States Ambassador to the Netherlands
- In office September 6, 1978 – June 17, 1981
- President: Jimmy Carter
- Preceded by: Robert J. McCloskey
- Succeeded by: William J. Dyess

Personal details
- Born: Geraldine Mack; June 19, 1923 Saint Paul, Minnesota, U.S.
- Died: October 16, 2023 (aged 100)
- Party: Democratic
- Spouse: Burton M. Joseph
- Children: 2 (1 deceased)
- Education: University of Minnesota
- Profession: Journalist, academic, diplomat

Geraldine Mack Joseph (June 19, 1923 – October 16, 2023) was an American journalist, academic, political figure, and diplomat who served as the United States Ambassador to the Netherlands.

== Life and career ==
Geraldine Mack was born in Saint Paul, Minnesota, on June 19, 1923. She graduated with a degree in journalism from the University of Minnesota in 1946 and became a staff writer for the Minneapolis Star-Tribune where she worked until 1953. In 1948, she worked as a speechwriter for Hubert H. Humphrey during his successful campaign for United States Senator. In 1956, she was active in the campaign of Adlai Stevenson.

From 1962 to 1963, she became a member of the National Commission on Youth Employment, and from 1962 to 1967 she served on the National Institute of Mental Health Advisory Council. She served on the National Commission on Income Maintenance Programs from 1967 to 1969. Joseph served as President of the National Mental Health Association from 1968 to 1969.

Active in Democratic Party politics, Joseph served as Chairwoman of the Minnesota Democratic–Farmer–Labor Party. In 1959, she was named a member of the Democratic National Committee from Minnesota and in 1968, she became Vice Chairwoman of the DNC.

From 1972 to 1978, she was a contributing editor and columnist for the Star Tribune. In 1977, she was appointed to the U.S. Commission on Mental Health.

Joseph was appointed U.S. Ambassador to the Netherlands in 1978 and served until 1981. From 1983 to 1993, Ambassador Joseph was a Senior Fellow at the University of Minnesota's Hubert H. Humphrey School of Public Affairs.

Joseph served as a member of the Council on Foreign Relations and a member of the Carleton College Council. She was also a member of the board of directors for companies, including Honeywell, Hormel, Northwestern Bell, and Northwestern National Bank.

== Personal life ==
Her husband Burton M. Joseph was a commodities broker with whom she had three children, sons Scott and Jon and daughter Shelley Joseph Kordell. In 2003, Joseph Kordell was shot and killed at the Hennepin County Government Center by her cousin Susan Berkovitz, with whom she was involved in a property dispute. Her attorney, Richard Hendrickson, was also wounded in the attack. Berkovitz was convicted and is serving a life sentence.

Joseph died on October 16, 2023, at age 100.

== Awards ==
Joseph received honorary doctorates from Bates College, Macalester College, and Carleton College. She was also recognized by the University of Minnesota's School of Journalism, the Anti-Defamation League, and the Humphrey Institute. She and her husband were Jewish and were active in their congregation.

== Sources ==
- Office of the Historian, U.S. department of State, Record of Appointment, Geri M. Joseph, accessed December 31, 2012

Diplomatic posts
Preceded by Robert J. McCloskey	United States Ambassador to the Netherlands; 1978–1981	Succeeded by William J. Dyess
Party political offices
Preceded by Anne Vetter	Democratic-Farmer-Labor Party Chairwoman; 1958-1960	Succeeded by Evelyn Malone
