= Covey T. Oliver =

American diplomat and law professor

Covey Thomas Oliver
- Born: April 21, 1913; Laredo, Texas
- Died: February 22, 2007 (aged 93); Easton, Maryland
- Awards: Order of the Coif

Academic background
- Education: University of Texas School of Law; Columbia Law School (S.J.D., 1953)

Covey Thomas Oliver (April 21, 1913 – February 22, 2007) was a United States diplomat and law professor.

== Early life and education ==
Oliver was born in Laredo, Texas on April 21, 1913. His father, Pheneas Covey, was a rancher, and his mother, Jane Thomas Covey, was a schoolteacher. Oliver was educated at the University of Texas, graduating in 1933. He then attended the University of Texas School of Law, graduating in 1936.

== Career ==
Upon graduating, Oliver began teaching at the University of Texas School of Law, but his job was interrupted in 1939, because of World War II. Because of it, Oliver moved to Washington, D.C. to join the Board of Economic Warfare. In this capacity, he later served in Spain, where he was responsible for buying raw materials to keep them out of enemy hands.

Oliver left the United States Department of State in 1949, becoming professor of international law at the UC Berkeley School of Law. While teaching at Berkeley, he was also himself a student at Columbia Law School and received an S.J.D. in 1953. He taught at Berkeley until 1956 when he joined the faculty of the University of Pennsylvania Law School.

In 1962, President of the United States John F. Kennedy appointed Oliver to the Inter-American Juridical Committee of the Organization of American States. In 1964, President Lyndon B. Johnson nominated Oliver as United States Ambassador to Colombia and he subsequently served in this post from August 13, 1964, until August 29, 1966. President Johnson then nominated Oliver as Assistant Secretary of State for Inter-American Affairs and Oliver held this office from July 1, 1967, until December 31, 1968, serving concurrently as director of the Alliance for Progress. In July 1968, Oliver said that "to speak of fair prices is a medieval concept, for we are in the era of free trade".

Oliver left government service in 1969, returning to the University of Pennsylvania Law School. Throughout his career, he advocated U.S. adherence to international law, the United Nations Charter, and the World Court. Oliver taught at the University of Pennsylvania Law School until his retirement in 1978, serving briefly as acting dean of the law school in 1978.

== Retirement and death ==
After his retirement, for three years, Oliver taught at Rice University in Houston, Texas. He then served as visiting professor at the American University and was an editor of the American Journal of International Law. He was a member of the Council on Foreign Relations, the American Law Institute, Phi Beta Kappa and the Order of the Coif.

Oliver spent the rest of his life in Inverness, California and Easton, Maryland. He died at his home in Easton on February 22, 2007.

Diplomatic posts
Preceded by Fulton Freeman	United States Ambassador to Colombia; August 13, 1964 – August 29, 1966	Succeeded by Reynold E. Carlson
Government offices
Preceded by Lincoln Gordon	Assistant Secretary of State for Inter-American Affairs; July 1, 1967 – December 31, 1968	Succeeded by Charles A. Meyer
