= Robert S. Ingersoll =

American diplomat (1914–2010)

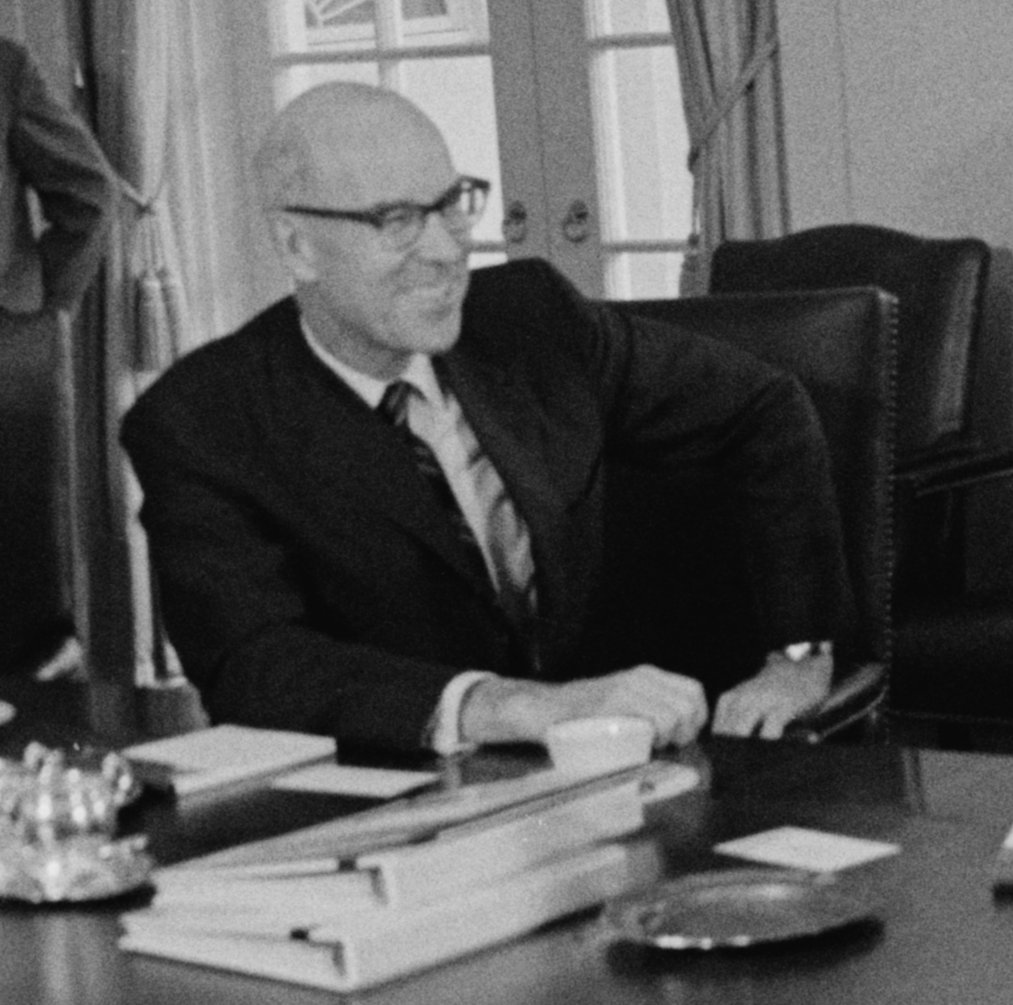
- Ingersoll in 1974

3rd United States Deputy Secretary of State
- In office July 10, 1974 – March 31, 1976
- President: Richard M. Nixon; Gerald Ford
- Preceded by: Kenneth Rush
- Succeeded by: Charles W. Robinson

11th Assistant Secretary of State for East Asian and Pacific Affairs
- In office January 8, 1974 – July 9, 1974
- President: Richard M. Nixon
- Preceded by: Marshall Green
- Succeeded by: Philip Habib

United States Ambassador to Japan
- In office April 12, 1972 – November 8, 1973
- President: Richard M. Nixon
- Preceded by: Armin H. Meyer
- Succeeded by: James Day Hodgson

Personal details
- Born: Robert Stephen Ingersoll; January 28, 1914 Galesburg, Illinois, U.S.
- Died: August 22, 2010 (aged 96) Evanston, Illinois, U.S.
- Party: Republican
- Spouse: Coralyn Eleanor Reid (m. 1938; died 2001)
- Education: Yale University

Robert Stephen Ingersoll (January 28, 1914 – August 22, 2010) was an American businessman and former diplomat. Ingersoll was Chief executive officer and chairman of the Board of BorgWarner and his international business experience was an important factor in his selection as United States Ambassador to Japan from 1972 to 1973, and assistant Secretary of State for East Asian and Pacific Affairs from 1973 to 1974, both during President Richard Nixon's term in office. He served as United States Deputy Secretary of State from 1974 to 1976 under both Presidents Nixon and Gerald Ford.

== Biography ==
Ingersoll was born on January 28, 1914, in Galesburg, Illinois. he attended the Phillips Academy in Andover, Massachusetts and graduated from the Sheffield Scientific School at Yale University in 1937. After two years with the Armco Steel Corporation, he was hired in 1939 by his father's company, Ingersoll Steel and Disc Company. The company was a subsidiary of Borg-Warner, and he was named in 1942 as works manager of the firm's Kalamazoo, Michigan plant and as head of its Chicago plant in 1945, before being named as division vice president in 1947 and president in 1950 and then as Borg-Warner administrative vice president in 1953. Ingersoll was named in 1956 as the firm's president and chief operating officer, succeeding his father in the post. He was named as that firm's chairman and chief executive in 1961. As CEO, Ingersoll was an active supporter of Urban League programs, supporting "better housing, economic opportunities and voting rights for the colored race" and noting that "[o]ur labor force will be increasingly Negro". By 1972, the firm did business in 22 countries around the world and had global sales of $1.15 billion. Shifting to foreign car companies as U.S. domestic manufacturers bought production in house, by 1971 Ingersoll saw automobile transmission sales increase more than tenfold to 487,000 units in the preceding decade.

Ingersoll's experience in dealing with business ventures in Japan played a major role in his choice by President Nixon as United States Ambassador to Japan in 1972, where he was only the second person who was not a career diplomat to be chosen in the period following World War II and the first businessperson to be selected. Ingersoll helped deal with differences between the nations regarding Japan's $3.5 billion trade surplus with the United States, negotiating agreements that led to Japanese imports in excess of $1 billion worth of American agricultural and manufactured products. In 1974, he was named as Assistant Secretary of State for East Asian and Pacific Affairs and served in that post until 1976. After the Lockheed bribery scandals were disclosed to the public, Ingersoll played a lead role in the State Department's handling of the affair, which he stated had done "grievous damage" to U.S. foreign relations, with Lockheed having paid $3 million in bribes to the office of Japanese Prime Minister Kakuei Tanaka and more than $1 million in improper payments to Prince Bernhard of the Netherlands. The scandal led to the downfall of governments overseas and the resignations of two senior Lockheed officials.

As a trustee of the Aspen Institute of Humanistic Studies, he was an active participant in the organization's programs conducted in Colorado, where he participated in discussions with labor officials, politicians and religious leaders on major issues facing society in addition to skiing. Ingersoll was former chairman of the Panasonic Foundation and also served as the vice president of the board of directors of the United States Chamber of Commerce.

Ingersoll died at age 96 on August 22, 2010, at his home in Evanston, Illinois. He was survived by three daughters, 11 grandchildren and 21 great-grandchildren. His wife, the former Coralyn Reed, died in 2001 after 63 years of marriage.

Government offices
Preceded by Marshall Green	Assistant Secretary of State for East Asian and Pacific Affairs; January 8 – July 9, 1974	Succeeded by Philip Habib
Diplomatic posts
Preceded by Armin H. Meyer	United States Ambassador to Japan; 1972–1973	Succeeded by James Day Hodgson
Political offices
Preceded by Kenneth Rush	U.S. Deputy Secretary of State; 1974–1976	Succeeded by Charles W. Robinson
