= Charles W. Robinson =

American entrepreneur

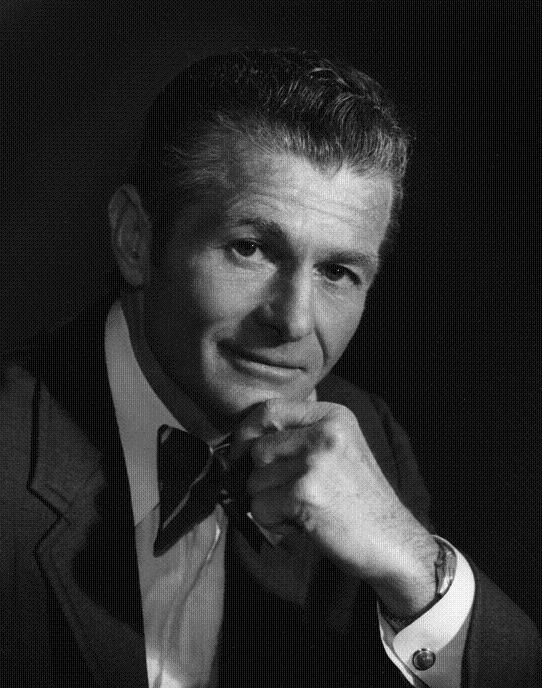

4th United States Deputy Secretary of State
- In office April 9, 1976 – January 20, 1977
- President: Gerald Ford
- Preceded by: Robert S. Ingersoll
- Succeeded by: Warren Christopher

6th Under Secretary of State for Economic Affairs
- In office January 3, 1975 – April 9, 1976
- President: Gerald Ford
- Preceded by: George Wildman Ball
- Succeeded by: William D. Rogers

Personal details
- Born: Charles Wesley Robinson; September 7, 1919 Long Beach, California, U.S.
- Died: May 20, 2014 (aged 94) Santa Fe, New Mexico, U.S.
- Spouse: Tamara Lindovna (m. 1957)
- Education: University of California, Berkeley; Stanford Business School

Charles Wesley Robinson (September 7, 1919 – May 20, 2014) was an American entrepreneur who was involved with many successful business adventures in the mining and shipping industry. He also served as United States Deputy Secretary of State. He was president of CBTF Co. and M Ship Co., a board member of Nike and Chairman of Nike's Finance Committee.

== Biography ==
Robinson was born in Long Beach, California, and spent his early years on a ranch overlooking the Antelope Valley in the Western Mojave Desert. He received his bachelor's degree cum laude in international economics from the University of California, Berkeley in 1941. After graduating from a 90-day engineering program at the United States Naval Academy in May 1942, he stayed on as an instructor for another year.

He then received an assignment to the heavy cruiser USS Tuscaloosa and spent nearly two years on the treacherous Murmansk run. The young lieutenant found himself in charge of the main engine division on the ship during the D-Day landing of Normandy, during which the Tuscaloosa engaged in a long battle with a German battery (reported by the Pulitzer Prize-winning war correspondent Ira Wolfert in the August 1944 issue of Reader's Digest).

After further duty in the Pacific at Iwo Jima and Okinawa, in February 1946, Robinson had earned enough points to be discharged from the Navy and left for Palo Alto, California, to enter the Stanford University Business School. He graduated with a business degree through an accelerated program in May 1947.

He died on May 20, 2014, aged 94, in Santa Fe, New Mexico.

== Timeline ==
- 1941–45 US Navy Engineering Officer
- 1947–49 Golden State Dairy. Managed the company's manufacturing plants in California. Received several patents for creative, but not necessarily successful ideas, including "Nucaroma"—which packaged the smell of a new car in an aerosol can. Became president of a new startup subsidiary company—Harvestaire Corp.
- 1950 McKinsey & Company. Served as management consultant to Meier & Frank.
- 1951–52 Utah Construction Company. Sent to Panama to set up a timber operation.
- 1952–74 Founder and President of the Marcona Mining Company (financed by Utah Construction Company and Cyprus Mines), which began by operating an iron ore mine out of San Juan, Peru. (This region was named the District of Marcona by the Peruvian government in 1955.) The Marcona board members from Utah Construction consisted of Mariner Eccles, Ed Littlefield and Alan Christensen see photo. Through Robinson's innovative vision, the Marcona company expanded into the shipping industry. In an effort to support the transport of iron ore to Japan, Robinson continued to push for larger ships eventually designing and in 1961 constructing the first Panamax, the largest vessel to navigate the Panama Canal. This 105,000-ton ship received much press coverage at the time. Other innovations included the development of a slurry system (Marconaflo) to transport iron ore from mine into and out of ships in a fluid state and development of the first joint oil/ore carriers.
- 1950–74 Mining/steel operations and port development in Brazil, Saudi Arabia, New Zealand, Australia, India and Chile. This includes establishment of Samarco (joint venture between Marcona and Samitri, a Brazilian company) through which iron ore mined at Minas Gerais (Brazil) was transported via slurry pipeline to a port they developed at Ponta Ubu. Robinson selected Al-Jubail (Saudi Arabia) as the location to develop a port to deliver the iron ore and develop Saudi Arabia's first steel mill. Oil was then transported back to Brazil from Saudi Arabia in the same ships.
- 1974 Appointed as Undersecretary of State for Economic Affairs during the Gerald Ford administration. Newsweek Magazine (November 3, 1975) referred to Robinson as a 'Maverick' and "A master of statecraft".
- 1976 Appointed as United States Deputy Secretary of State (Number two ranking position in the State Department then headed by Henry Kissinger). Negotiated the US-Soviet grain deal, among other accomplishments.
- 1976 Kuhn, Loeb & Co. Wall Street investment banking firm. Senior Managing Partner.
- 1977 Blyth, Eastman, Dillon. Wall Street investment banking firm. Vice-chairman.
- 1979–87 Founded and was president of ETCO (Energy Transition Corporation) based out of Santa Fe, New Mexico. (The four other stockholders were William J. Casey, William C. Turner, Robert W. Fri, and Frank G. Zarb).
- 1988–2014. Set up the DynaYacht Company (now CBTF Co.) based in San Diego, California. Worked with Alberto Calderon, Bill Burns, Matt Brown and Peter Isler to create a radical new appendage design that uses a canting ballast for righting moment and two foils - one forward and one aft of the keel - for side force and steering functions of the yacht. The prototype had been used on the boat called the US in the America's Cup Race. The Canting Ballast Twin Foil technology (CBTF technology) design won Sailing World's "Boat of the Year Award" in 2001.
- 1992–2014. Development of a 265-acre (1.07 km^{2}) ranch near La Cienega, New Mexico.
- 1998–2024. M-Ship Co. Another concept, the 'M-Hull' was originally designed to reduce bow waves to reduce erosion in the canals of Venice, Italy. An M-hull vessel generates bow wave like any other boat, however, it recaptures this wave immediately with its rigid side skirts, forcing it to spiral through the hull’s planing tunnels. There, it mixes with in-rushing air to create a cushion that pushes the hull higher out of the water, creating hydrodynamic and aerodynamic lift, which reduces drag and increases speed. Additional benefits to the design include better fuel efficiency, directional stability, wake suppression and a gentle ride with less slamming and rolling. This technology has been used on an 80 ft (24 m) boat called the M80 Stiletto, built for the US Military, as well as a recreational 8 ft (2.4 m) sailing Dinghy called the Wahoo. The Wahoo received the Bronze award in the 2003 Industrial Design Excellence Awards competition. The M-Hull was also used by the Duffy Electric Boat Company beginning in 2009 for the M-240, M-220 and M-160 models. In 2024 Duffy reintroduced the M-Hull with the Cat 16 model. In 2022 Ghostworks Marine connected with Robinson’s daughter, Heather L. Robinson, with a shared goal of revitalizing and making good use of her father’s innovations. Ghostworks thus acquired an exclusive global license for the entirety of the M-Ship Co intellectual property portfolio, including the M80 Stiletto. Ghostworks Marine now produces other models using the M-Hull concept.

== Boards and other organizations ==
- Trilateral Commission (one of the original members, joining in 1976)
- Brookings Institution
- Arthur D. Little
- North American Institute
- Allen Group (Allen Telecom)
- Northrop Corporation
- Clark Oil, Inc.
- Pan American Airways
- Nike, Inc. (Board of directors since 1977; Chairman of the Finance committee; until 2004)
- Mills College (trustee)
- Pacific Basin Economic Council
- Santa Fe Concert Association

== Family ==
Robinson was married since 1957 to Mara (Lindovna) Robinson, who was a founder of the Opera-West Company in San Francisco in the 1950s and was active in the '60s in trying to dissolve racial barriers. She has served on many boards including the San Francisco Opera Company, St. John's College and Save Venice Inc. They have three daughters, Heather L. Robinson (b. 1957), Lisa A. Robinson (b. 1959) and Wendy P. Robinson (b. 1962).

== Quotes ==
“If I knew ahead of time, it wouldn’t be any fun”—Reply in response to a San Francisco Business magazine reporter’s question in 1974 as to what Robinson thought he would accomplish in the job of Under-Secretary of State.

“Management by self-induced crisis”—Robinson’s description of his business style.

"No one who has any self-doubts would ever wear a bow-tie"—Robinson quoted in a New York Times article April 22, 1979 on the returning fashion of bow-ties (Robinson had always worn a bow tie)

Government offices
Preceded by George Wildman Ball	Under Secretary of State for Economic Affairs; January 3, 1975 – April 9, 1976	Succeeded by William D. Rogers
Preceded by Robert S. Ingersoll	U.S. Deputy Secretary of State; April 9, 1976 – January 20, 1977	Succeeded by Warren Christopher
