= James Day Hodgson =

American politician

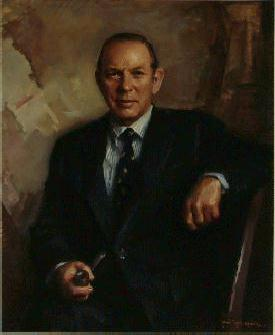
- Portrait c. 1970s

United States Ambassador to Japan
- In office July 19, 1974 – February 2, 1977
- President: Gerald Ford
- Preceded by: Robert S. Ingersoll
- Succeeded by: Mike Mansfield

12th United States Secretary of Labor
- In office July 2, 1970 – February 1, 1973
- President: Richard Nixon
- Preceded by: George Shultz
- Succeeded by: Peter J. Brennan

United States Deputy Secretary of Labor
- In office 1969–1970
- President: Richard Nixon
- Preceded by: James J. Reynolds
- Succeeded by: Laurence Silberman

Personal details
- Born: December 3, 1915 Dawson, Minnesota, U.S.
- Died: November 28, 2012 (aged 96) Malibu, California, U.S.
- Party: Republican
- Spouse: Maria Denend (m. 1943)
- Children: 2
- Education: University of Minnesota (BA); University of California, Los Angeles

James Day Hodgson (December 3, 1915 – November 28, 2012) was an American politician. He served as the Secretary of Labor and the Ambassador to Japan.

== Life and career ==
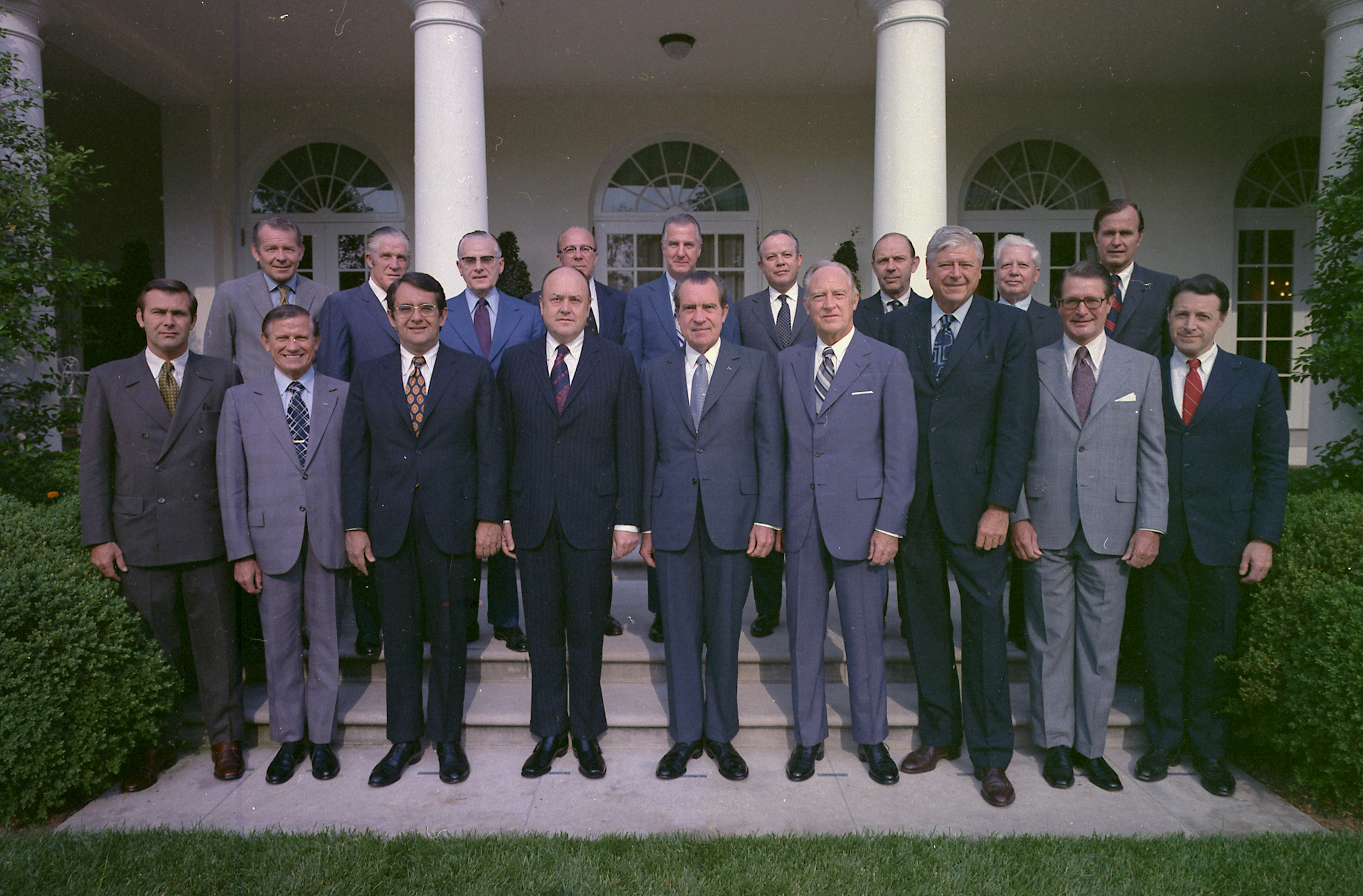
Hodgson in a group photo of Nixon's cabinet on June 16, 1972, third from the right in the back row.

Hodgson was born in Dawson, Minnesota, the son of Fred Arthur Hodgson, a lumberyard owner, and his wife, Casaraha M. (née Day). He graduated from the University of Minnesota in 1938 where he was a member of Phi Sigma Kappa fraternity, and began graduate studies at the University of California at Los Angeles. He married the former Maria Denend on August 24, 1943. They had two children, Nancy Ruth Hodgson, and Frederick Jesse Hodgson.

During World War II, Hodgson served as an officer in the United States Navy. He worked for Lockheed for 25 years. From 1970 to 1973, Hodgson served as Richard Nixon's Secretary of Labor, and from 1974 to 1977, he served as the U.S. Ambassador to Japan under Gerald Ford.

Beginning in 1977, Hodgson served as the Chairman of the Board of the Uranium Mining Company. Hodgson served as an adjunct professor at University of California, Los Angeles and was visiting scholar from the American Enterprise Institute.

Following the death of former Labor Secretary W. Willard Wirtz on April 24, 2010, Hodgson became the oldest living former Cabinet member. He died on November 28, 2012, in Malibu, California, and is interred at the Forest Lawn Memorial Park, in Los Angeles, California.

== Publications ==
- "American Senryu", The Japan Times, 1992 (a collection of senryū, short humorous poems similar to haiku)
- "Doing Business with the New Japan", 2000 (written with Yoshihiro Sano and John L. Graham)

Political offices
Preceded by George Shultz	United States Secretary of Labor; 1970–1973	Succeeded by Peter Brennan
Diplomatic posts
Preceded by Robert Ingersoll	United States Ambassador to Japan; 1974–1977	Succeeded by Mike Mansfield
