= Bureau of Western Hemisphere Affairs =

U.S. State Department division

- Seal of the United States Department of State

Bureau overview
- Jurisdiction: Executive branch of the United States
- Headquarters: Harry S. Truman Building, Washington, D.C., United States
- Employees: 9,530 (As of 2009)
- Annual budget: $254 million (FY 2009)
- Bureau executive: Juan Pablo Segura, Assistant Secretary of State for Western Hemisphere Affairs
- Parent department: U.S. Department of State
- Website: state.gov/wha

The Bureau of Western Hemisphere Affairs (WHA) is a part of the U.S. Department of State, charged with implementing U.S. foreign policy and promoting U.S. interests in the Western Hemisphere, as well as advising the under secretary of state for political affairs.

== Organization ==
The offices of the Bureau of Western Hemisphere Affairs direct, coordinate, and supervise U.S. government activities within the region, including political, economic, consular, public diplomacy, and administrative management issues.

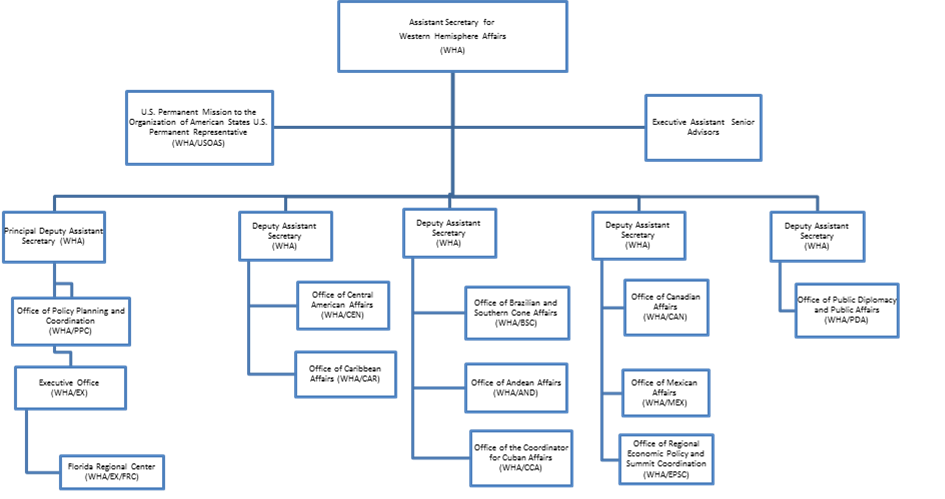
Organizational chart of the Bureau of Western Hemisphere Affairs as of 2015

- Office of Andean Affairs – Coordinates policy on Bolivia, Colombia, Ecuador, Peru, and Venezuela
- Office of Brazilian and Southern Cone Affairs – Coordinates policy on Argentina, Brazil, Chile, Paraguay, and Uruguay
- Office of Canadian Affairs – Oversees Canada–United States relations
- Office of Caribbean Affairs – Coordinates policy on Antigua and Barbuda, the Bahamas, Barbados, Dominica, the Dominican Republic, Grenada, Guyana, Jamaica, Saint Kitts and Nevis, Saint Lucia, Saint Vincent and the Grenadines, Suriname and Trinidad and Tobago
- Office of the Coordinator for Cuban Affairs – Oversees Cuba–United States relations
- Office of Central American Affairs – Coordinates policy on Belize, Costa Rica, El Salvador, Guatemala, Honduras, Nicaragua, and Panama
- Office of Economic Policy and Summit Coordination – Oversees policy related to trade, energy, finance, and the Summits of the Americas
- Executive Office – Responsible for human resources and management support services for the bureau's overseas missions
- Office of Mexican Affairs – Oversees Mexico–United States relations
- Office of Public Diplomacy and Public Affairs – Oversees public diplomacy activities at WHA's overseas posts
- Office of Haitian Affairs - Oversees Haiti–United States relations
- Office of Policy Planning and Coordination – Responsible for the bureau's strategic planning and evaluation

The Bureau of Western Hemisphere Affairs also oversees the United States Mission to the Organization of American States.
