= Charles Wallace Adair =

United States Foreign Service officer

Charles W. Adair
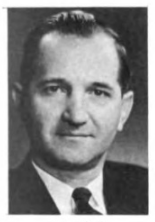

U.S. Ambassador to Panama
- In office May 6, 1965 – September 6, 1969
- President: Lyndon B. Johnson
- Preceded by: Jack Hood Vaughn
- Succeeded by: Robert M. Sayre

U.S. Ambassador to Uruguay
- In office September 15, 1969 – September 28, 1972
- President: Richard Nixon
- Preceded by: Robert M. Sayre
- Succeeded by: Ernest V. Siracusa

Charles Wallace Adair, Jr. (26 January 1914 – 22 January 2006) was a career United States Foreign Service officer, serving as Ambassador to Panama (1965–1969) and Ambassador to Uruguay (1969–1972).

== Early life ==
Adair was born in Xenia, Ohio. He graduated from the University of Wisconsin, and worked for Chase Bank in Panama before joining the State Department in 1940.

== Foreign service career ==
Adair was posted to various economic positions in US missions around Europe, particularly the American Embassy in Paris, France. Adair also served as the US vice-consul in Bombay, India, in 1943. He also served tours in Mexico, India, Brazil, and Belgium. In November 1958, Adair was the U.S. representative to the SEATO Economic meeting in Bangkok, Thailand. The next year he was appointed Deputy Assistant Secretary for Economic Affairs within the Department. In 1961, he was also appointed deputy secretary general of the Organisation for European Economic Co-operation in Paris. Adair also served as Deputy Chief of Mission in Buenos Aires in 1963 until his appointment as Ambassador.

He was appointed Ambassador Extraordinary and Plenipotentiary of the United States to Panama on 6 May 1965, presenting his credentials to President Marco Aurelio Robles Méndez on 13 May 1965. Adair assumed the ambassadorship during a period of difficult United States–Panama relations. In 1966, Panamanian student demonstrators struck Adair in the back with a milk carton filled with red paint. During his ambassadorship, Adair worked to rebuild relations and initiated talks that culminated in the Torrijos–Carter Treaties. He left the post on 6 September 1969. He was appointed Ambassador Extraordinary and Plenipotentiary to Uruguay on 15 September 1969, presented his credentials on 13 November 1969 and left the post on 28 September 1972. He retired from the Foreign Service in 1972.

Adair lived in Stuart, Florida, from his retirement until 1996, when he moved to Virginia. He died January 22, 2006, in Falls Church, Virginia, aged 91.

Diplomatic posts
Preceded by Jack Hood Vaughn	United States Ambassador to Panama; 1965–1969	Succeeded by Robert M. Sayre
Preceded by Robert M. Sayre	United States Ambassador to Uruguay; 1969–1972	Succeeded by William J. Jorden
