= William A. Eaton =

American diplomat

William Eaton
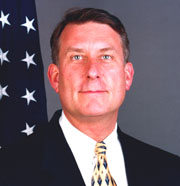

United States Ambassador to Panama
- In office September 9, 2005 – July 5, 2008
- President: George W. Bush
- Preceded by: Linda Ellen Watt
- Succeeded by: Barbara J. Stephenson

Assistant Secretary of State for Administration
- In office July 13, 2001 – May 23, 2005
- Preceded by: Patrick F. Kennedy
- Succeeded by: Rajkumar Chellaraj

Personal details
- Born: William Alan Eaton; 1952 (age 73–74) Winchester, Virginia, U.S.
- Education: University of Virginia (B.A.)

William Alan Eaton is an American diplomat who served as Assistant Secretary of State for Administration and United States Ambassador to Panama.

== Biography ==
Eaton was born in Winchester, Virginia in 1952. He earned a B.A. in international relations from the University of Virginia in 1978. After college, he joined the United States Army, serving mainly in South Korea.

Eaton then joined the United States Foreign Service, beginning a career as a Foreign Service Officer. He was posted at Georgetown, Moscow, Istanbul, Milan and Ankara. Eaton is fluent in Spanish, Turkish, Russian, Dutch and Italian. As a political officer in Georgetown, Guyana, Eaton represented the United States in negotiations. He also led successful negotiations between the United States, Russia, Ukraine, the European Union, Canada, and Sweden to establish centers for former weapons scientists. In Washington, D.C., Eaton worked in the Office the Assistant Secretary of State for Administration, the Office of the Assistant Secretary of State for Diplomatic Security, the Office of the Under Secretary of State for Management, and the Office of the United States Deputy Secretary of State.

In September 1998, Eaton took a three-year hiatus in his diplomatic career, serving as executive director of the Young Presidents' Organization.

In 2001, President of the United States George W. Bush nominated Eaton as Assistant Secretary of State for Administration; Eaton held this office from July 13, 2001, until May 25, 2005. Bush then named Eaton United States Ambassador to Panama, serving from September 9, 2005, to July 5, 2008. In 2008, he became Dean of the School of Language Studies at the National Foreign Affairs Training Center.

In 2010, Eaton was selected by the Secretary General Anders Fogh Rasmussen to be the Assistant Secretary General for Executive Management of NATO.

In 2013 left his position at NATO

to become Vice Chairman of the Board of AFS-USA, Inc. In 2015 he was appointed chairman of the Board of this organization.

== Awards ==
Eaton is a recipient of the 2004 Presidential Distinguished Service Award, The State Department's Arnold Raphel Award for Mentoring, 2001 Presidential Meritorious Service Award, 2004 Honorary National Distinguished Principal Award for leadership in international education and the State Department's Leamon R. Hunt Award for Administrative Excellence.

Government offices
Preceded by Patrick F. Kennedy	Assistant Secretary of State for Administration; July 13, 2001 – May 25, 2005	Succeeded by Rajkumar Chellaraj
Preceded by Linda Ellen Watt	United States Ambassador to Panama; September 9, 2005 – August 2008	Succeeded by Barbara J. Stephenson
