= List of ambassadors of the United States to Panama =

Ambassador of the United States to Panama
- Seal of the United States Department of State

- Flag of a United States ambassador

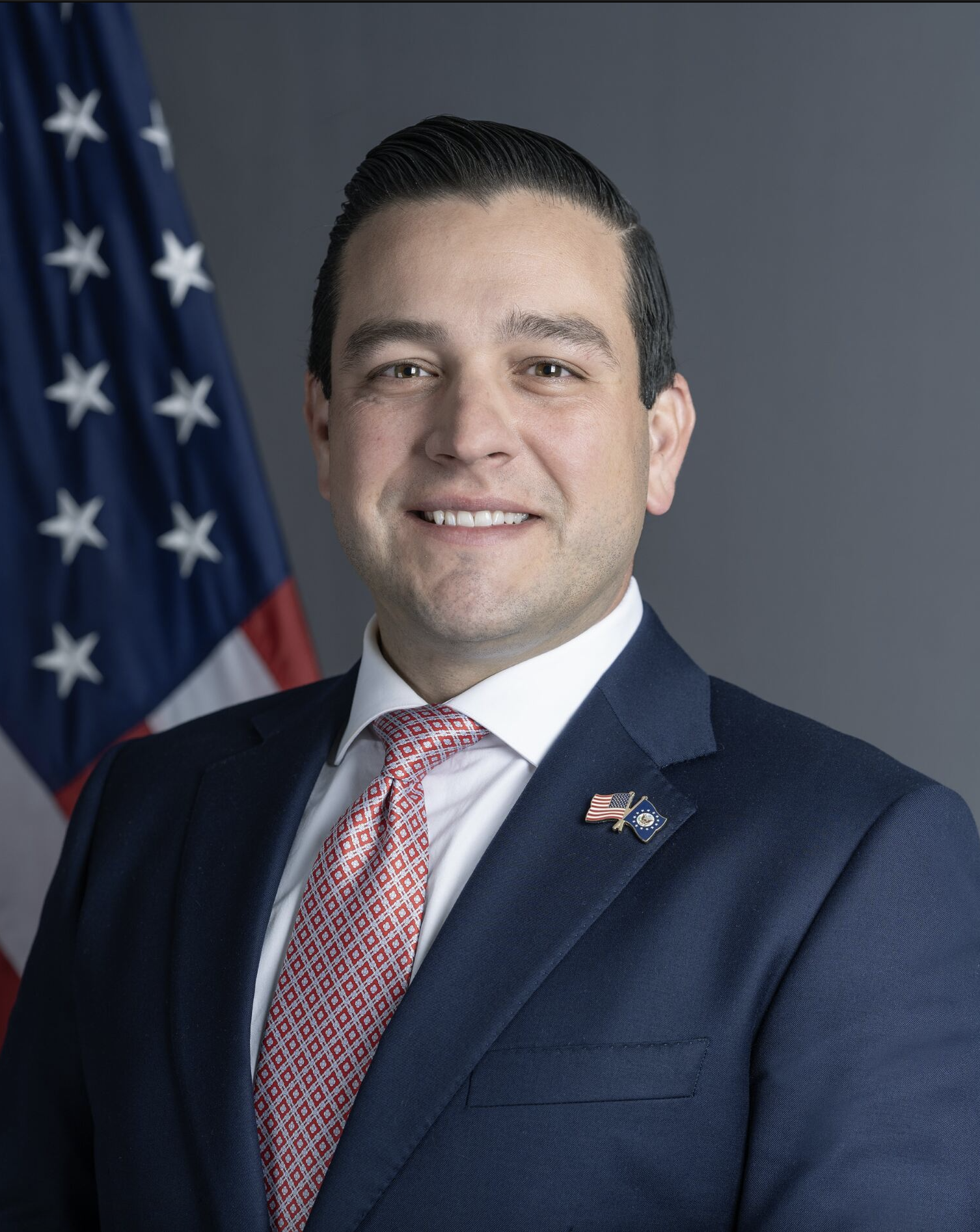
- Incumbent; Kevin Marino Cabrera since May 5, 2025
- Nominator: The president of the United States
- Appointer: The president with Senate advice and consent
- Inaugural holder: William Insco Buchanan (as Envoy Extraordinary and Minister Plenipotentiary)
- Formation: December 17, 1903
- Website: U.S. Embassy - Panama City

The United States has maintained diplomatic relations with Panama since its separation from Colombia in 1903. The rank of the U.S. chief of mission to Panama was originally Envoy Extraordinary and Minister Plenipotentiary, but it was upgraded to Ambassador Extraordinary and Plenipotentiary in 1939.

Normal diplomatic relations between the United States and Panama have been interrupted only once, from January 10 to April 3, 1964, in the aftermath of the Martyrs' Day riots over sovereignty.

== List of ambassadors ==
The following is a list of United States ambassadors, or other chiefs of mission, to Panama. The title given by the United States State Department to this position is currently Ambassador Extraordinary and Plenipotentiary.

Representative	Title	Presentation of credentials	Termination of mission	Appointed by
William I. Buchanan	Envoy Extraordinary and Minister Plenipotentiary	December 17, 1903	February 2, 1904	Theodore Roosevelt
John Barrett	Envoy Extraordinary and Minister Plenipotentiary	July 22, 1904	May 13, 1905	Theodore Roosevelt
Charles E. Magoon	Envoy Extraordinary and Minister Plenipotentiary	August 7, 1905	September 25, 1906	Theodore Roosevelt
Herbert G. Squiers	Envoy Extraordinary and Minister Plenipotentiary	November 8, 1906	August 3, 1909	Theodore Roosevelt
R. S. Reynolds Hitt	Envoy Extraordinary and Minister Plenipotentiary	March 26, 1910	July 19, 1910	William H. Taft
Thomas C. Dawson	Envoy Extraordinary and Minister Plenipotentiary	September 24, 1910	December 1, 1910	William H. Taft
Henry Percival Dodge	Envoy Extraordinary and Minister Plenipotentiary	November 9, 1911	June 10, 1913	William H. Taft
William Jennings Price	Envoy Extraordinary and Minister Plenipotentiary	October 11, 1913	December 28, 1921	Woodrow Wilson
John Glover South	Envoy Extraordinary and Minister Plenipotentiary	December 28, 1921	January 5, 1930	Warren G. Harding
Roy T. Davis	Envoy Extraordinary and Minister Plenipotentiary	March 14, 1930	September 20, 1933	Herbert Hoover
Antonio C. Gonzalez	Envoy Extraordinary and Minister Plenipotentiary	October 11, 1933	January 9, 1935	Franklin D. Roosevelt
George T. Summerlin	Envoy Extraordinary and Minister Plenipotentiary	March 8, 1935	July 7, 1937	Franklin D. Roosevelt
Frank P. Corrigan	Envoy Extraordinary and Minister Plenipotentiary	September 2, 1937	June 14, 1939	Franklin D. Roosevelt
William Dawson	Ambassador Extraordinary and Plenipotentiary	July 14, 1939	April 21, 1941	Franklin D. Roosevelt
Edwin C. Wilson	Ambassador Extraordinary and Plenipotentiary	May 23, 1941	September 23, 1943	Franklin D. Roosevelt
Avra M. Warren	Ambassador Extraordinary and Plenipotentiary	June 22, 1944	January 5, 1945	Franklin D. Roosevelt
Frank T. Hines	Ambassador Extraordinary and Plenipotentiary	November 1, 1945	February 20, 1948	Harry S. Truman
Monnett B. Davis	Ambassador Extraordinary and Plenipotentiary	May 28, 1948	January 24, 1951	Harry S. Truman
John C. Wiley	Ambassador Extraordinary and Plenipotentiary	July 25, 1951	November 27, 1953	Harry S. Truman
Selden Chapin	Ambassador Extraordinary and Plenipotentiary	January 22, 1954	May 29, 1955	Dwight D. Eisenhower
Julian F. Harrington	Ambassador Extraordinary and Plenipotentiary	August 30, 1955	July 14, 1960	Dwight D. Eisenhower
Joseph S. Farland	Ambassador Extraordinary and Plenipotentiary	August 29, 1960	August 31, 1963	Dwight D. Eisenhower
Wallace W. Stuart	Chargé d'Affaires ad interim	September 1963	January 10, 1964	Lyndon B. Johnson
Henry L. Taylor	Chargé d'Affaires ad interim	April 3, 1964	May 6, 1964	Lyndon B. Johnson
Jack Hood Vaughn	Ambassador Extraordinary and Plenipotentiary	May 6, 1964	February 27, 1965	Lyndon B. Johnson
Charles W. Adair, Jr.	Ambassador Extraordinary and Plenipotentiary	May 13, 1965	September 6, 1969	Lyndon B. Johnson
Robert M. Sayre	Ambassador Extraordinary and Plenipotentiary	October 31, 1969	March 14, 1974	Richard Nixon
William J. Jorden	Ambassador Extraordinary and Plenipotentiary	April 17, 1974	August 25, 1978	Richard Nixon
Ambler Hodges Moss, Jr.	Ambassador Extraordinary and Plenipotentiary	October 6, 1978	July 15, 1982	Jimmy Carter
Everett Ellis Briggs	Ambassador Extraordinary and Plenipotentiary	October 29, 1982	February 24, 1986	Ronald Reagan
Arthur H. Davis, Jr.	Ambassador Extraordinary and Plenipotentiary	April 4, 1986	January 3, 1990	Ronald Reagan
Deane Roesch Hinton	Ambassador Extraordinary and Plenipotentiary	January 9, 1990	February 12, 1994	George H. W. Bush
Oliver P. Garza	Chargé d'Affaires ad interim	February 12, 1994	November 7, 1995	Bill Clinton
William J. Hughes	Ambassador Extraordinary and Plenipotentiary	November 7, 1995	October 13, 1998	Bill Clinton
Simon Ferro	Ambassador Extraordinary and Plenipotentiary	February 26, 1999	March 1, 2001	Bill Clinton
Linda Ellen Watt	Ambassador Extraordinary and Plenipotentiary	December 17, 2002	June 3, 2005	George W. Bush
William A. Eaton	Ambassador Extraordinary and Plenipotentiary	September 9, 2005	July 5, 2008	George W. Bush
Barbara J. Stephenson	Ambassador Extraordinary and Plenipotentiary	August 6, 2008	July 14, 2010	George W. Bush
Phyllis M. Powers	Ambassador Extraordinary and Plenipotentiary	August 8, 2010	April 3, 2012	Barack Obama
John Law	Chargé d'Affaires ad interim	April 3, 2012	May 15, 2012	Barack Obama
Jonathan D. Farrar	Ambassador Extraordinary and Plenipotentiary	May 15, 2012	June 5, 2015	Barack Obama
John D. Feeley	Ambassador Extraordinary and Plenipotentiary	December 9, 2015	March 9, 2018	Barack Obama
Roxanne Cabral	Chargé d'Affaires ad interim	March 9, 2018	January 16, 2020	Donald Trump
Philip Laidlaw	Chargé d'Affaires ad interim	January 16, 2020	August 1, 2020	Donald Trump
Stewart Tuttle	Chargé d'Affaires ad interim	August 1, 2020	November 21, 2022	Donald Trump
Stewart Tuttle	Chargé d'Affaires ad interim	August 1, 2020	November 21, 2022	Joe Biden
Mari Carmen Aponte	Ambassador Extraordinary and Plenipotentiary	November 21, 2022	January 20, 2025	Joe Biden
John Barrett	Chargé d'Affaires ad interim	January 20, 2025	April 28, 2025	Donald Trump
Kevin Marino Cabrera	Ambassador Extraordinary and Plenipotentiary	May 5, 2025	Incumbent	Donald Trump

== See also ==
- Panama – United States relations
- Foreign relations of Panama
- Ambassadors of the United States
