= Ambler H. Moss =

America academic and diplomat (1937–2022)

United States Ambassadors to Panama
- In office October 6, 1978 – July 15, 1982
- President: Jimmy Carter
- Preceded by: William J. Jorden
- Succeeded by: Everett Ellis Briggs

Personal details
- Born: Ambler Hodges Moss Jr; September 1, 1937 Baltimore, Maryland, US
- Died: December 27, 2022 (aged 85) Coral Gables, Florida
- Spouse: Serena Welles Moss
- Children: Ambler H. Moss III: Benjamin S. Moss; Serena M. Moss; Nicholas G.O. Moss
- Parent(s): Mr and Mrs Ambler H. Moss

Ambler Hodges Moss Jr. (1 September 1937 – 27 December 2022) was an American diplomat, lawyer and Professor of International Studies in the University of Miami. He served as the ambassador of the United States to Panama from 1978 to 1982. He was known for his involvement towards the negotiation of The Panama Canal Treaty. Moss was initially the Dean of International Studies in the University of Miami.

He served as ambassador under President Jimmy Carter from 1978 to 1982, and was married to Serena Welles. He had lived from Panama to Miami, US until his death at 85 on 27 December 2022.

== Early life, education and background ==
Moss was born on September 1, 1937, in Baltimore, Maryland, US, to a father, who is a lawyer. He is a descent of George Mason and grandfather, Hunter Holmes Moss, Jr. He had his education in Gilman School, Baltimore and further went to Yale University in 1960, where he graduated with BA in Politics and Economics. He entered the US Navy, and served the military for four years in 1964 before going into public service. Moss was a member of the Navy League of the United States as well as the American Legion. He was assigned as a vice consul at the Consulate General of the USA in Via Laietana, Barcelona in Spain from 1964 to 1966. He also defended the Catalans while serving as a desk officer of the United States Department of State from 1969 to 1970.

Moss started his directorate degree in law and graduated in 1970 from George Washington University, with a JD in law. He became a lawyer, and from 1972 to 1976, he worked as a legal advisor at Coudert Brothers, a legal firm in Washington, D.c, and then Brussels.

== Career ==
Moss continued his diplomatic work and later became a member of the United States delegation to the Organization of American States (OAS), a position he held from 1966 to 1969, and also the Deputy Assistant Secretary of State for Legislative Affairs from 1977 to 1978. On September 29, 1978, he was sworn by the President of America, Jimmy Carter as the United States ambassador extraordinary and plenipotentiary to Panama, succeeding William J. Jorden. He was appointed during a hard time for the both countries and to help negotiate the return of the Panama Canal to President Omar Torrijos in 1976 to 1977. As a result of his role, he became again a member of the United States–Panama Consultative Commission from 1995 to 2001, which he had served while working as the ambassador.

Interested in Catalan political and cultural reality, Moss was awarded the Creu de Sant Jordi in 1986. In 1994, he sponsored the office in Miami of the Consorci de Promoció Comercial de Catalunya (COPCA) and was one of the architects of the Cooperation Agreement between Florida and Catalonia, as a result of which the governor of Florida, Lawton Chiles, visited Catalonia in 1996, and President Jordi Pujol to Miami. He was also a member of the jury of the Catalonia International Prize.

From 1984 to 1994, he was Professor of International Studies at the University of Miami and director of the Dante B. Fascell North-South Center from 1984 to 2004, where most of his writings were published. Ambler Moss was also founding dean of the Graduate School of International Studies. Since 2008, he has been a member of the Philosophy and Social Sciences Section of the Institute of Catalan Studies, as well as the Council on Foreign Relations (CFR) in New York City, the Royal Institute of International Affairs in London, and the International Institute of Strategic Studies (ISS).

Ambler Moss continued to teach at the University of Miami until shortly before his passing. Moss also served on many dissertation committees including those of Melanie Goergmaier, Michael Szanto, and Jimmy Wong.

In January 2021, Moss was song the signees of the "Dialogue for Catalonia" manifesto, promoted by Òmnium Cultural and published in The Washington Post and The Guardian. Moss managed the meeting between President Carles Puigdemont and Jimmy Carter that took place in Atlanta in April, 2017, where the foundation of the former American president.

== Personal life ==
On May 12, 1972, Moss married Serena Welles. They had the reception at St. John's Episcopal Church in Lafayette Square, Washington, D.C. Moss was also fluent in English, French, and Catalan.

== Selected works ==
=== Journalistic articles ===
- Ambler H. Moss (1986). "The Panama Treaties: How an Era Ended". Latin American Research Review. 21 (3): 171–178. doi:10.1017/s0023879100016277.
- Ambler H. Moss (1994). "Introduction: The Summit of the Americas, 1994". Journal of Interamerican Studies and World Affairs. 36 (3). doi:10.1017/s002219370000345x.
- Ambler H. Moss (1985). "JWA Cover and Back matter". Journal of Interamerican Studies and World Affairs. 27 (1). doi:10.1017/s0022193700008415.

=== Books ===
- Ambler H. Moss; Stephen L. Lande (1997). A Critical Year for Hemispheric Free Trade: Can Countries Agree on a Blueprint?. The North-South Center, University of Miami. p. 22. ISBN 9781574540420.
- Ambler H. Moss; Stephen L. Lande (1998). Free Trade in the Americas: Fulfilling the Promise of Miami and Santiago. The North-South Center, University of Miami. p. 32. ISBN 9781574540611.
- Ambler H. Moss; Max G Manwaring; Myles R. R. Frechette (2003). In Search of the Endgame: A Long-term Multilateral Strategy for Colombia. North-South Center, University of Miami. p. 14. ISBN 9781574541359.
