= Hugo F. Rodriguez =

American diplomat

Hugo Rodriguez
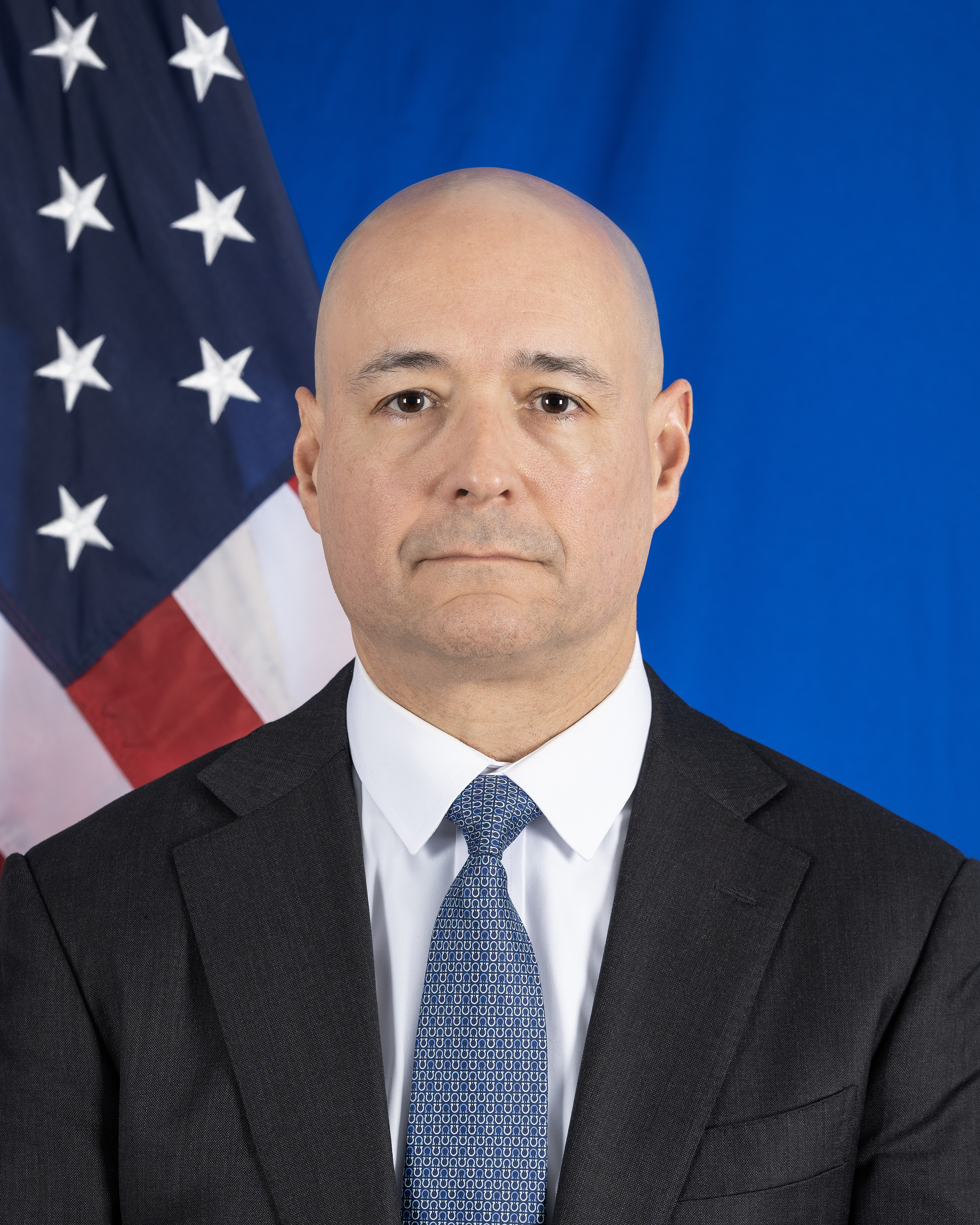

United States Ambassador to Nicaragua
- Never assumed office
- Assuming office N/A
- President: Joe Biden
- Succeeding: Kevin K. Sullivan

Personal details
- Born: Philadelphia, Pennsylvania, U.S.
- Education: Hampden–Sydney College (BA); University of Virginia (MBA)

Hugo F. Rodriguez Jr. is an American diplomat who has served as the principal deputy assistant secretary in the Bureau of Consular Affairs since February 2023. Rodriguez is the designate to serve as United States ambassador to Nicaragua after confirmation by the U.S. Senate in 2022, but he was rejected publicly by the government of Nicaragua before and after his confirmation. He has previously served as a senior advisor in the Bureau of Western Hemisphere Affairs.

== Early life and education ==
Rodriguez was born in Philadelphia. He earned a Bachelor of Arts degree in economics from Hampden–Sydney College and a Master of Business Administration from the University of Virginia Darden School of Business.

== Career ==
A career United States Foreign Service officer, Rodriguez has served in missions in Italy, Peru, Mexico, Paraguay, and others. He joined the Bureau of Western Hemisphere Affairs in January 2019, serving as deputy assistant secretary and later acting principal deputy assistant secretary. He resigned from these positions in December 2021.

On February 13, 2023, he became the Principal Deputy Assistant Secretary in the Bureau of Consular Affairs.

In July of 2025, he was named the James C. Wheat, Jr. Professor of Leadership at Hampden-Sydney College.

=== Nomination to be United States ambassador to Nicaragua ===
On May 6, 2022, President Joe Biden nominated Rodriguez to be the next ambassador to Nicaragua. On July 28, 2022, the Nicaraguan government announced that it had withdrawn their approval of Rodriguez's nomination to the ambassadorship after he made comments criticizing the regime during his confirmation hearings before the Senate Foreign Relations Committee. Despite this, Rodriguez was favorably reported by the committee on August 3, 2022, and was confirmed by the Senate on September 29, 2022. However, on September 30, the Vice President of Nicaragua Rosario Murillo reaffirmed their July position and said Rodriguez would not be admitted to Nicaragua.

== Awards and recognitions ==
Rodriguez has won numerous State Department performance awards.

== Personal life ==
Rodriguez speaks Italian and Spanish.

Diplomatic posts
| Preceded by Kevin K. Sullivan | United States Ambassador to Nicaragua; Never assumed office | Designate |
