= Barbara J. Stephenson =

American diplomat and university official

Dr. Barbara Jean Stephenson
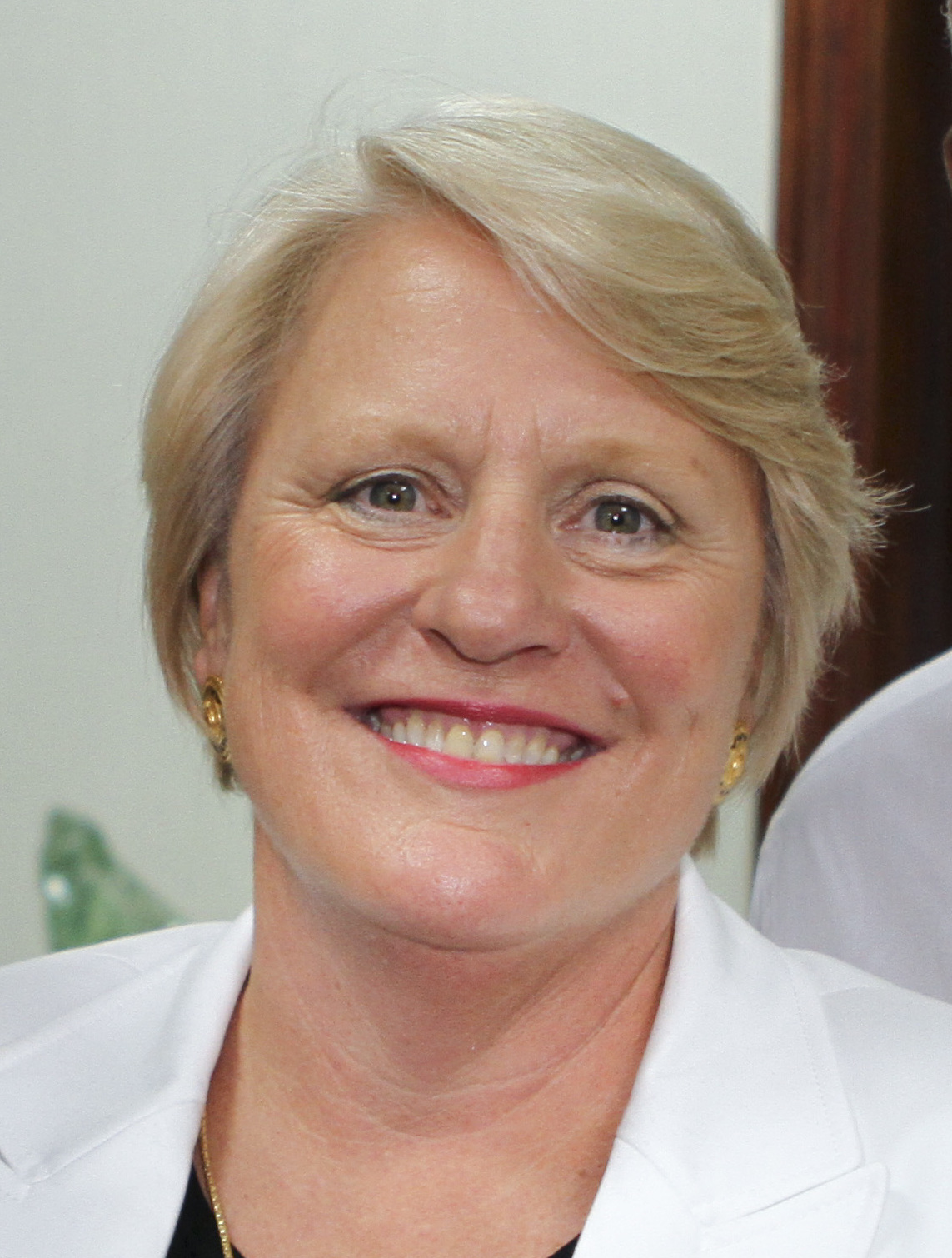
- Stephenson in 2012

Dean of the Leadership and Management School at the Foreign Service Institute
- In office 2013–2015

Personal details
- Born: 1958 (age 67–68)
- Spouse: Matthew Furbush
- Children: 2
- Education: University of Florida
- Profession: Diplomat

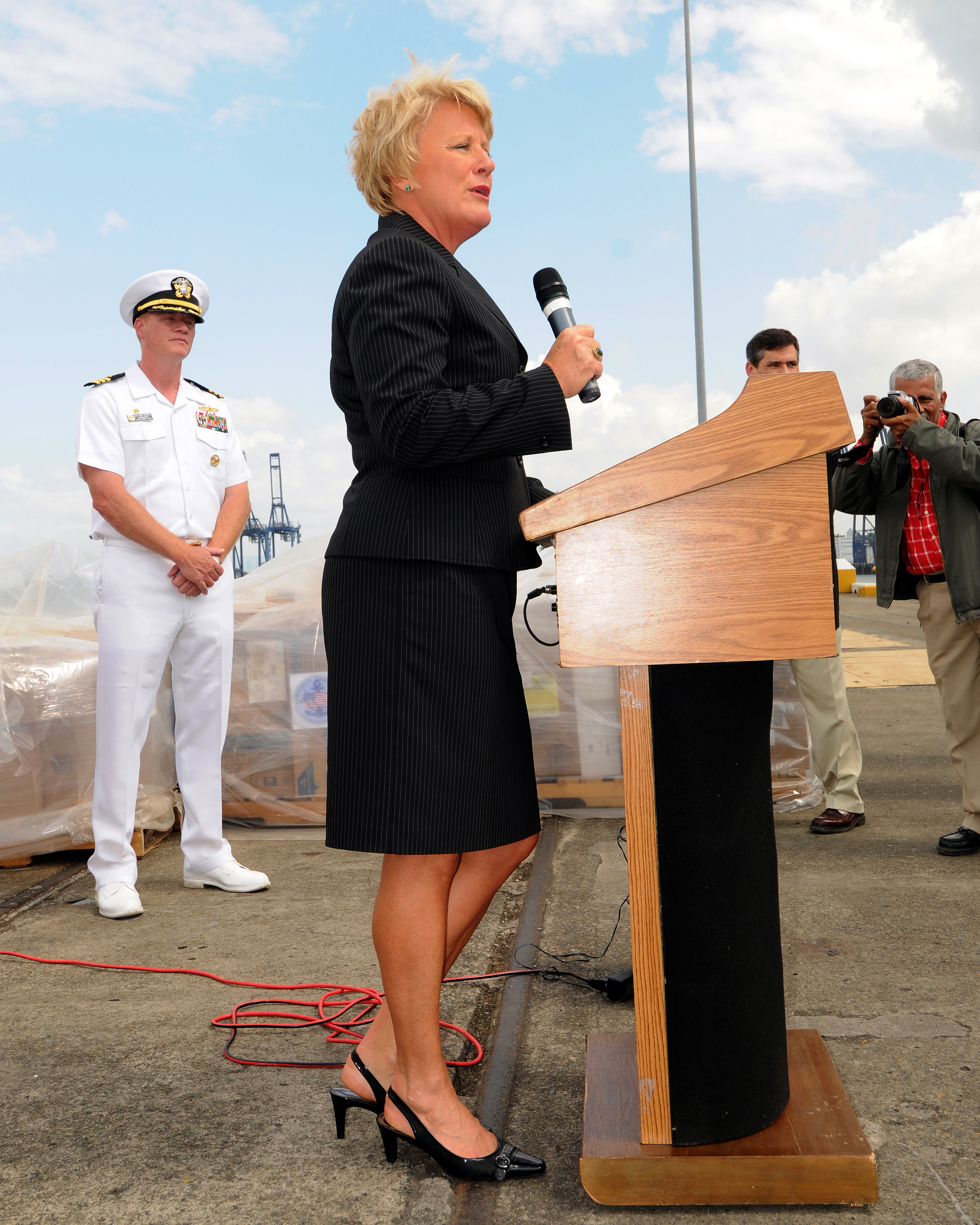
Stephenson speaking at a handoff ceremony for Project Handclasp donations in Panama City, 2008

Barbara Jean Stephenson (born 1958) is an American diplomat and university official. Stephenson served as president of the American Foreign Service Association from 2015 to 2019. She was formerly the Dean of the Leadership and Management School of the Foreign Service Institute in Arlington, Virginia. Formerly, she was Deputy Chief of Mission at the US Embassy in London, and acted as Chargé d'Affaires following the departure of Ambassador Louis Susman. She is the former United States Ambassador to the Republic of Panama. She was confirmed by the U.S. Senate and was appointed by President Barack Obama in the Summer of 2010.

== Biography ==
Stephenson received her bachelor's degree, Masters, and Ph.D. in English all from the University of Florida. She is married to Matthew Furbush. They have two children.

== Career ==
Stephenson is a career member of the Senior Foreign Service and holds the rank of Minister Counselor at the Foreign Service. She joined in 1985 and began her career in Panama as an economic and then political officer. Stephenson served as Deputy Coordinator for Iraq at the U.S. Department of State. For her work - particularly the development and implementation of the civilian surge in Iraq - she won the State Department's Distinguished Honor Award.

In August 2009, Stephenson wrote in a leaked diplomatic cable that Panamanian president Ricardo Martinelli had asked her for wiretaps on his political opponents in which she noted his "bullying style" and "autocratic tendencies". Martinelli's administration stated after the leak that "help in tapping the telephones of politicians was never requested" and that Stephenson was "mistaken" in her interpretation. Ambassador Stephenson's assessment was vindicated when the Panamanian government ruled to press corruption charges against Martinelli and to prosecute two former Secretaries of Panama's National Security Council on illegal wiretapping charges.

Stephenson became the first woman to be appointed deputy ambassador and acting ambassador at the U.S. Embassy in London.

After retiring from the Foreign Service, she presently serves as the Vice Provost for Global Affairs and Chief Global Officer at the University of North Carolina.

Diplomatic posts
| Preceded by William A. Eaton | United States Ambassador to Panama; 2008–2010 | Succeeded by Phyllis M. Powers |
