= Laura Farnsworth Dogu =

American diplomat (born 1964)

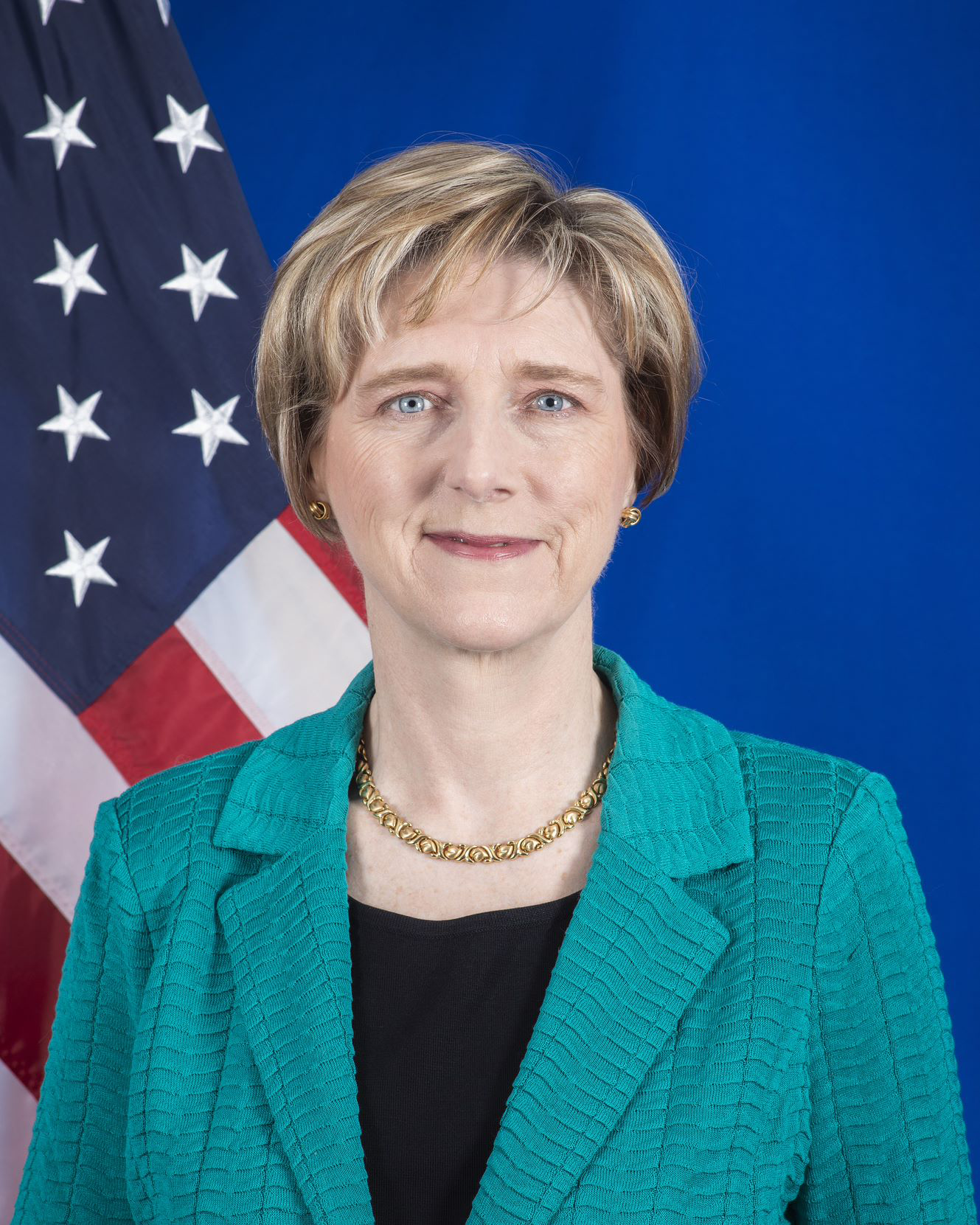

U.S. Chargé d'Affaires to Venezuela
- In office January 22, 2026 – April 15, 2026
- President: Donald Trump
- Preceded by: John McNamara
- Succeeded by: John M. Barrett

United States Ambassador to Honduras
- In office April 12, 2022 – April 18, 2025
- President: Joe Biden; Donald Trump
- Preceded by: James D. Nealon (2017)
- Succeeded by: Colleen A. Hoey (Chargé d'Affaires)

United States Ambassador to Nicaragua
- In office October 6, 2015 – October 30, 2018
- President: Barack Obama; Donald Trump
- Preceded by: Phyllis M. Powers
- Succeeded by: Kevin K. Sullivan

Personal details
- Born: 1964 (age 61–62)
- Spouse: Aydin Dogu
- Children: 2
- Education: Southern Methodist University; Dwight D. Eisenhower School for National Security and Resource Strategy

Laura Farnsworth Dogu (born 1964) is an American diplomat who had served as the U.S. Chargé d'Affaires to Venezuela. She previously served as the United States Ambassador to Honduras in the Biden and second Trump administrations as well as the United States Ambassador to Nicaragua in the Obama and first Trump administrations.

== Early life and education ==
Dogu is a resident of Texas. Her father was a career Naval officer. Dogu earned a B.A., B.B.A. (1985) and M.B.A. (1989) from Southern Methodist University in Dallas. She graduated with an M.S. from the Dwight D. Eisenhower School for National Security and Resource Strategy in 2007.

== Career ==
Dogu began her career as a marketing representative for IBM, where she worked for five years. After joining the Foreign Service, she became a consular officer at the embassy in San Salvador in 1991. She then served as a consular and political officer at the American Embassy in Turkey. Returning to Washington, D.C., in 1996, she was assigned to the State Department operations center. A year later she became a staff assistant in the Bureau of Consular Affairs. International assignments followed in Egypt, Turkey and Mexico. When she was nominated by President Obama to become U.S. Ambassador to Nicaragua, she was serving as Deputy Chief of Mission at the U.S. Embassy in Mexico City.

=== Ambassador to Nicaragua ===
On May 13, 2015, President Barack Obama nominated Dogu to be the next ambassador to Nicaragua. Hearings were held before the Senate Foreign Relations Committee on her nomination on July 15, 2015. On July 29, 2015, the committee favorably reported the nomination to the Senate floor. Dogu was confirmed by the entire Senate via voice vote on August 5, 2015.

=== Ambassador to Honduras ===
On November 5, 2021, President Joe Biden nominated Dogu to be the next ambassador to Honduras. Hearings were held before the Foreign Relations Committee on February 8, 2022. The committee favorably reported her nomination to the Senate floor on March 8, 2022. The entire Senate confirmed Dogu via voice vote on March 10, 2022. She arrived in Honduras on April 6, 2022, and presented her credentials to President of Honduras Xiomara Castro on April 12. She left Honduras on April 18, 2025, and subsequently served as the Foreign Policy Advisor to the Chairman of the Joint Chiefs of Staff General Dan Caine.

=== Chargé d'affaires to Venezuela ===
On January 22, 2026, President Donald Trump tapped her as the United States’s top diplomat in Venezuela as the administration sought to control the country’s oil industry following its capture of Venezuela’s former leader, Nicolás Maduro, earlier that month. As part of the restoration of United States-Venezuela relations, she arrived at Maiquetia International Airport on January 31. On February 2, she met with Venezuelan interim president Delcy Rodríguez at the Miraflores Palace to discuss "the work agenda between the Bolivarian Republic of Venezuela and the United States of America".

== Personal life ==
Dogu and her husband, Aydin, have two children. She speaks Spanish, Turkish, and Arabic.

=== Writing ===
Along with Taylor Larimore, Mel Lindauer, and Richard Ferri, Dogu co-authored The Bogleheads' Guide to Retirement Planning. She is one of the leaders of the online Bogleheads (www.bogleheads.org).

Diplomatic posts
Preceded by Phyllis M. Powers	United States Ambassador to Nicaragua; 2015–2018	Succeeded by Kevin K. Sullivan
Preceded by James D. Nealon	United States Ambassador to Honduras; 2022–2025	Succeeded by Colleen A. Hoey
Preceded by John McNamara	United States Chargé d'affaires to Venezuela; 2026–present	Succeeded by John M. Barrett
