= Rajkumar Chellaraj =

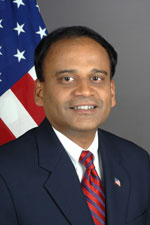

Assistant Secretary of State for Administration
- In office June 5, 2006 – January 20, 2009
- President: George W. Bush
- Preceded by: William A. Eaton
- Succeeded by: Joyce Anne Barr

Personal details
- Born: India
- Citizenship: United States
- Education: Harvard University; New York University; Clarkson University; National Institute of Technology, Trichy

Rajkumar Chellaraj is a Senior Advisor to the Director of the Hoover Institution and to the President of Stanford University on Finance and Operations. Previously, he was the CFO and Administrative Dean at the Stanford Business School, Stanford University. Concurrently, he was also the Chief Operating Officer at the Stanford Graduate School of Business Stanford Seed program with primary focus in Africa and India from 2015 to 2017. He is the former Assistant Secretary of State for Administration at the US State Department from 2006 to 2009 under Secretary of State Condoleezza Rice. Currently, he is the Chairman of Wellbore Integrity Solutions, a global oilfield services provider. Previously, he was on the board of Wahoo Fitness, a fitness technology company. He was an advisor and consultant to United Nations leadership in operations and management. He was on the board of GardaWorld from 2017 to 2019, a Canadian private security firm. Also, from 2015 to 2018, he was Chairman of RhythmOne, a digital advertising company.

== Background ==
Early in his career, Chellaraj worked at Strategic Analysis Incorporated, a consulting firm based in Wyomissing, Pennsylvania. He later worked at Exxon Corporation where he was Fuels Manager for industrial fuels in Singapore and marketed jet fuel in Asia and Australia. When Exxon Corporation re-entered India, he was General Manager.

During the George H. W. Bush administration, Chellaraj joined the United States Environmental Protection Agency as Program Advisor and then worked at the United States Agency for International Development as counselor to the Assistant Administrator for Asia. In 2001, Chellaraj joined the United States Mint as senior executive officer; at the US Mint, he was the chief information officer and was also responsible for supply chain, logistics and manufacturing operations at the West Point Mint, the Philadelphia Mint, the Denver Mint, and the San Francisco Mint. He returned to the private industry when Blackstone Group acquired Celanese Corporation and became the Director of Corporate Planning in 2005.

President of the United States George W. Bush nominated Chellaraj as Assistant Secretary of State for Administration on 24 January 2006, succeeding William A. Eaton. He was confirmed unanimously by the United States Senate on 26 May 2006, and was in this position till 20 January 2009. After leaving the US Government, he worked as Vice President, Planning for Hostess Brands, an American-based bakery company.

He received a bachelor's degree in chemical engineering from the National Institute of Technology, Trichy, formerly Madras University, where he graduated first in his class and also received the Distinguished Alumni Award in 2013. He then immigrated to the United States and studied at Clarkson University, receiving a master's degree in chemical engineering. He later attended New York University receiving an M.B.A. and then Harvard Kennedy School at Harvard University, receiving an M.P.A. He attended the London Business School, International Management Exchange Program and studied French at the Sorbonne in Paris.
