= Jack H. Vaughn =

American diplomat (1920–2012)

Jack Vaughn
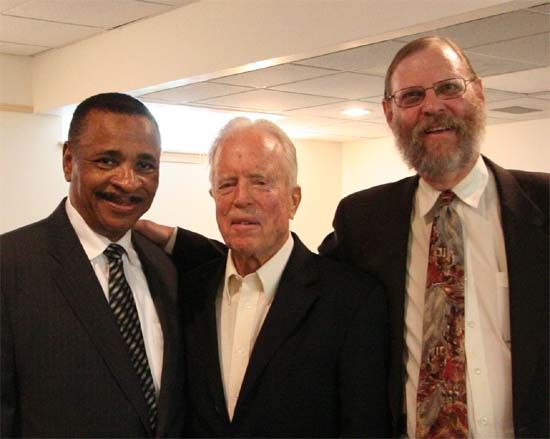
- Jack Vaughn, the second director of the Peace Corps, (center) with C. Payne Lucas, president emeritus of Africare, (left) on May 4, 2007

United States Ambassador to Colombia
- In office June 9, 1969 – June 25, 1970
- President: Richard Nixon
- Preceded by: Henry L. Taylor
- Succeeded by: Leonard J. Saccio

2nd Director of the Peace Corps
- In office March 1, 1966 – April 30, 1969
- President: Lyndon B. Johnson; Richard Nixon
- Preceded by: Sargent Shriver
- Succeeded by: Joseph Blatchford

United States Ambassador to Panama
- In office May 6, 1964 – February 27, 1965
- President: Lyndon B. Johnson
- Preceded by: Reynold E. Carlson
- Succeeded by: Charles W. Adair, Jr.

Personal details
- Born: Jack Hood Vaughn; August 18, 1920 Columbus, Montana, U.S.
- Died: October 29, 2012 (aged 92) Tucson, Arizona, U.S.
- Children: Jack Vaughn Jr. Jane Vaughn Constantineau

Jack H. Vaughn

11th Assistant Secretary of State for Inter-American Affairs
- In office March 22, 1965 – February 28, 1966
- Preceded by: Thomas C. Mann
- Succeeded by: Lincoln Gordon

Jack Hood Vaughn (August 18, 1920 – October 29, 2012) is an American who served as the second director of the United States Peace Corps, succeeding Sargent Shriver. Vaughn was appointed Peace Corps director in 1966 by President Lyndon Johnson and was the first Republican to head the agency.

== Early life and education ==
Vaughn was born in Columbus, Montana, in 1920, the son of Elijah H. Vaughn and Blair (Cox) Vaughn. Vaughn grew up in Montana where his father managed a retail store and eventually owned the Vaughn and Ragsdale stores. Vaughn moved with his family to Albion, Michigan, in 1931 where his father managed a chain of clothing stores in Michigan and Montana. Vaughn attended Albion Public Schools and graduated from Albion High School in 1939. Vaughn earned a Bachelor of Arts from the University of Michigan in 1943.

=== Boxing career ===
Vaughn became interested in boxing as a youth and would spar with local boxers on the third floor of his father's building in Albion, Michigan where a makeshift gymnasium was located. By age 14 Vaughn was boxing publicly in "smokers." "Everyone was smoking Roi-Tan cigars," says Vaughn. "We were fighting in a purple haze. It was $5 if you won, $3 if you didn't. The events featured three or four semi-pro boxing matches and one fairly professional striptease. If there was no striptease, they brought in the wrestlers." Vaughn was a Golden Gloves boxer and won three Golden Gloves championships. Vaughn would sometimes box in Detroit where he worked occasionally as a sparring partner for notable prizefighters, including Sugar Ray Robinson, Jake LaMotta, Willie Pep and Sandy Saddler.

Vaughn began fighting professionally in 1942 under the name of "Johnny Hood." "I was bumming around Mexico one summer when I ran out of money," Vaughn said. "I decided I would take my boxing and turn pro, but I didn't know enough Spanish at the time to tell whether the agent said I would get 60 pesos for four rounds or four pesos for 60 rounds. You can guess which figure was correct." Vaughn fought 26 featherweight bouts as a professional. Vaughn tells the story that the first time he fought professionally in Mexico, the fans cheered enthusiastically but he couldn't make out what they were saying and he thought they were cheering him on. It was only later that he learned that what the fans were shouting was "Kill the Gringo!" "My first fight was down in Juarez," said Vaughn. "I was in the first of a four-round preliminary match. My second was a high school kid from El Paso. The crowd began to shout, 'Mata al Gringo!' I asked my second what they were saying. He said, 'I think they're saying, 'Welcome to Juarez.' A week later I found out what that meant." Mata al Gringo! later became the title for Vaughn's Memoir. Vaughn was the head boxing coach at University of Michigan from 1942 to 1943 and also taught Spanish, French and Latin American affairs while he was at the University of Michigan.

=== Marine officer in World War II ===
During World War II, Vaughn served as an officer in the United States Marine Corps as a rifle company commander and a combat intelligence officer from 1942 to 1946. Vaughn saw combat in Eniwetok, Guam, and Okinawa. Vaughn left the Marines with the rank of captain. Vaughn earned the Purple Heart during his service. "I was wounded three times, all in the rear end," says Vaughn.

After returning from World War II, Vaughn earned a Master of Arts in 1947 in Romance Languages from the University of Michigan and a master's in economics. Vaughn taught Spanish, French and Latin American affairs while he was at the University of Michigan and was also the head boxing coach. "I wanted to be a professor of French literature," says Vaughn. Vaughn continued fighting to earn extra money while he worked at the University of Michigan. "I ended up losing the sight in my right eye in 1948," says Vaughn. "So in 1949, I went to the State Department."

== State Department career ==
=== USIA and USAID ===
Vaughn joined the US Information Agency (USIA) in 1949 as director of the bi-national center in La Paz, Bolivia and later moved to Costa Rica with the USIA. Vaughn joined the State Department in 1951 and spent 1951 to 1956 in Panama with the State Department. While working for the State Department in the 1950s Vaughn met several times with Che Guevara. "I met him seven or eight times. Each time I liked him less," says Vaughn. "My final meeting, I gave him a University of Michigan T-shirt. He wore it backwards." From 1959 to 1961 Vaughn was the USAID Mission director for Senegal, Mali, and Mauritania. Vaughn's background growing up on a ranch in Montana helped him in his work with USAID where he worked in "mainly agricultural reform. I had a lot of training," says Vaughn.

=== Peace Corps staff ===
Vaughn's connection with the Peace Corps began in 1961 when Peace Corps founding director Sargent Shriver came to Senegal where Vaughn was serving with USAID. "There were 4,000 volunteers signing up a day for the Peace Corps, and countries weren't asking for them. So Shriver came over to meet the Senegalese," says Vaughn. "I was the only one who spoke French. I went up to meet Shriver and his lawyer in their hotel room. They did not have on a stitch of clothing. We all sat down and had a conversation. They said they had never seen heat like that. It was 120 degrees and no air conditioning." Vaughn's boxing prowess and prior experience as a prize fighter paid off when Sargent Shriver decided to recruit Vaughn. "I was recruited by Sargent Shriver because I had been in the ring with Sugar Ray Robinson," Vaughn said. "He loves jocks." Coates Redmond described Vaughn as "barely medium height, slight of build, with ginger-colored hair and a 1940s moustache to match, quietly spoken and careful of gesture" in her history of the early years of the Peace Corps, Come As You Are. Before his appointment to the Peace Corps, Vaughn met with President Kennedy who didn't like Vaughn's mustache and told him he would have to shave it off if he wanted to work in the Peace Corps. Vaughn refused to shave the mustache but got the appointment anyway.

Vaughn joined the Peace Corps staff because "the Peace Corps idea had a great appeal to me. And the people I knew who were putting this idea into effect appealed to me even more." Shriver admired Vaughn's courage and felt anyone who would brave the ring with Sugar Ray Robinson would have the grit to fight for the Peace Corps in Latin America so when the Peace Corps decided to send volunteers to teach in Venezuela in 1963 despite the presence of Castro communists, Shriver made Vaughn his point man. "Shriver said, 'Show them your teeth, not your tail,'" Vaughn said. "Those teachers did great there. I'm sure it was his finest moment in the Peace Corps."

Vaughn served as the Latin-American director of the Peace Corps from October, 1961 to April, 1964. When Vaughn came to the Peace Corps there were only 78 volunteers serving in Latin America. By the time he left after two-and-a half years in the position, there were 2,500 volunteers working in rural and urban development in Latin America. Vaughn left the Peace Corps in 1964 to return to the State Department.

=== Ambassador to Panama ===
US Ambassador to Panama Joseph S. Farland resigned in August, 1963 leaving the United States without an ambassador for several months. The New York Times printed a story on January 10, 1964, criticizing the administration for leaving the post vacant and saying the vacancy had contributed to anti-American riots in Panama. "The absence of an American Ambassador was an invitation to the Communists to raise the devil," said Senator George D. Aiken, Republican of Vermont. "They have been waiting for this chance."

President Johnson named Vaughn US Ambassador to Panama in 1964 after the two nations broke off diplomatic relations because of nationalistic rioting in Panama. The Senate approved Vaughn's appointment on April 7, 1964. Vaughn arrived in Panama on April 17, 1964, to take up the post of Ambassador, now vacant for six months. His arrival was welcomed by Panamanians who knew and liked Vaughn from his previous work in Panama with the US AID mission. Vaughn had previously arranged for about 1,000 young Panamanians to go to the United States for post-graduate study. In the airport lounge, ten young Panamanians unfurled a 25-foot (7.6 m) long sign greeting Vaughn. "Jack, the scholarship holders remember your work and greet you," the sign read.

In the book The Negotiations Regarding the Panama Canal by Omar Jaen Suarez, Vaughn is given great credit for defusing the tensions between the two countries and starting the United States and Panama on the road to successfully negotiating the Panama Canal Treaty. "I lived here in a successful and comfortable way, dedicated to agricultural activities and as I was not a member of the U.S. military, I understood that now was the moment to change the relation, the cut of the pie, that Panama was receiving for the Canal" Vaughn said speaking of his time in Panama in the early 1950s. After Vaughn became ambassador to Panama, it was difficult for Vaughn to convince the US government to offer concessions because the Vietnam War was going on at the time. "It was a time of total war when the Pentagon was thinking of nothing else, like revising agreements or other annoyances like these, because they needed the military bases for training the troops," Vaughn said.

Vaughn's efforts were fruitful. On December 19, 1964, President Johnson made an address to the Panamanian people proposing the negotiation of an entirely new treaty on the Panama Canal. "In these new proposals we will take every possible step to deal fairly and to deal helpfully with the citizens of both Panama and of the United States who have served so faithfully through the years in operating and maintaining the Panama Canal," said Johnson. Although Vaughn takes no credit for President Carter's efforts beginning in 1977 to complete negotiations for a new Panama Canal treaty, Vaughn's early initiatives to reach an understanding with Panama paved the way for Carter's negotiations later.

=== Assistant Secretary of State ===
On February 12, 1965, President Johnson named Vaughn Assistant Secretary of State for Inter-American Affairs and the United States coordinator of the Alliance for Progress. The bureau was the single largest unit in the State Department with more than 600 employees in Washington and 2,000 more abroad. Vaughn was in charge of relations with the twenty Latin-American republics as well as Jamaica, Trinidad, and British Guinea. Vaughn's responsibilities included managing the Alliance for Progress and the office dealing with the Organization of American States. Vaughn also carried the title of United States Coordinator for the Alliance for Progress.

Vaughn promoted a Peace Corps-style approach to diplomacy. "If I had my way, every young foreign service officer who now spends his early career stamping visas would be forced to put in two years with the Peace Corps or two years in private business as a salesman or an assistant assembly line foreman," said Vaughn. "Anything that would teach them how to deal with people and get along with them."

On September 4, 1965, the New York Times reported that Vaughn had just completed a two-week trip to Latin America and returned with an enthusiastic report for President Johnson on the Alliance for Progress. Vaughn expressed his conviction that a "new and bright chapter" was starting in the partnership between Latin America and the United States. "Not long ago the people of Latin America were still doubtful about the goals of the alliance," Vaughn said. Today it is a reality that is marching better than I thought and it is a reality because our partnership is solid, enduring and expanding." During his trip, Vaughn talked with hundreds of workers and peasants and with the leaders of Mexico, El Salvador, Panama, Ecuador, Chile, Bolivia, and Peru. Vaughn was warmly received during his trip and was praised by Chilean President Eduardo Frei Montalva who expressed gratitude for US economic assistance that he said was "decisive" for the solution of Chile's economic problems.

== Peace Corps director ==
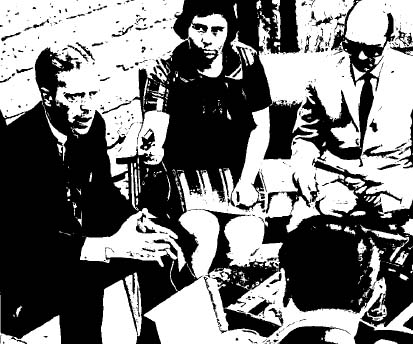
Peace Corps director Jack Vaughn meets with reporters and answers questions in fluent Spanish in Honduras in February 1969. From the Peace Corps Volunteer magazine May, 1969.

When Johnson picked Sargent Shriver to head up his "War on Poverty" in 1966, Vaughn was named Peace Corps director. "It was so good, so positive," Vaughn said of his appointment. "As a former bureaucrat, to join the Peace Corps was pure joy. All the stuff I knew we shouldn't do, we didn't do. All the things we should do, we did efficiently, effectively and cheaply."

Vaughn was appointed Peace Corps director on February 16, 1966. Vaughn was in a bar at 12:30 on M Street in Georgetown when the bar telephone rang and the bartender asked, "Is there a Mr. Jack Vaughn here?" Vaughn answered yes the bartender says, "it's someone who says he's the president of the United States." "Let me finish this drink," replied Vaughn taking his time before picking up the phone and saying hello. On the line was President Lyndon Baines Johnson himself. "Vaughn," said LBJ. "How would you like to be the director of the Peace Corps?" "Mr. President," Vaughn replied calmly, "I thought you'd never ask."

=== Senate approval and swearing-in ===
The Senate Foreign Relations Committee approved Vaughn's appointment as Peace Corps director 12 to 1 with Wayne Morse, Democrat of Oregon opposing Vaughn. In the same committee meeting Morse was also the sole vote against Lincoln Gordon to succeed Vaughn as Assistant Secretary for Inter-American Affairs. During the hearings Senator Laushe of Ohio asked Vaughn about reports that some Peace Corps volunteers did not dress properly. "Don't you have many of what you call the 'mustache people' around?" asked the Senator. The Senate hearing room burst into laughter as did Laushe when he realized what he had said to the mustached Vaughn. "That's the meanest thing you ever said to me, Senator," replied Vaughn.

"The Peace Corps is the point of the lance," said Vaughn on February 28, 1966, in his first interview after his Senate confirmation as Director. "In Latin America, it is the human cutting edge of the Alliance for Progress, the focus of ideas and people in action. In other countries also we are finally beginning to deal with the real problems of the day - peace and poverty and war and changing attitudes and hatred."

Vaughn was sworn in as Peace Corps director at a White House ceremony by President Lyndon Johnson on March 1, 1966, the fifth anniversary of the founding of the Peace Corps. "Jack Vaughn I first met out in a little fishing village in Africa, but he, like Sargent Shriver, I observed on that first meeting, is a disciple of peace," said President Johnson. "His life has been spent in the service of the cause of peace. This is the third job that I have asked Jack Vaughn to take since I met him in that fishing village in 1961. Each of these jobs he has served with great distinction."

Vaughn said that his first task as Director would be to visit Peace Corps programs around the world, meet staff members and volunteers and explain his plans. Vaughn meant that literally and started at the top of the 12-story Peace Corps Headquarters building to personally meet and shake hands with every employee. "I want to help build on this image and bask in your collected glory," said Vaughn. "I'm pleased to be with you." During his first month as director, Vaughn gave an estimated 60 speeches, visited 15 college campuses to recruit volunteers and traveled overseas with visits to Ethiopia, Kenya, Tanzania, India, and Thailand.

=== Environmental focus ===
One of Vaughn's most lasting contributions to the Peace Corps was to redirect the Peace Corps' focus to environmental issues. Vaughn first became interested in 1963 when he met a volunteer in Chile named Duty Green. "Duty Green was a forester, and he went to Chile with a commitment to plant a million trees," Vaughn said. "When his tour was almost over, he sent me a message saying, 'I'm very sorry. I've only been able to plant 900,000 trees in my time here. Can you extend my stay?' Here was a guy who would never say, 'What am I doing here?' He could look at a forest and know it was there because of his efforts. This is what we should have been doing - have them plant a tree, clean up a stream," Vaughn said. "That was the explosion of awareness that changed the Peace Corps, because I wised up and still had time to do something about it. Those generalists, with no prior technical training, could be trained to do a beautiful job in just 10 weeks to turn wasteland into forest, to run nurseries, to do earth dam construction and supervision. It's a wonderful and satisfying job for a volunteer," Vaughn said.

=== Problems in Nigeria ===
The New York Times reported on October 6, 1966, that Vaughn had left for Africa to investigate an unusually large number of complaints by Peace Corps Volunteers regarding their living allowances and working conditions in Nigeria. Vaughn's itinerary included stops in Senegal, Nigeria, and Liberia to inspect Peace Corps operations in the three countries. Complaints in Nigeria included closing the Peace Corps hostels intended for use by Peace Corps Volunteers on vacations or free weekends, a $19 cut in volunteers' $147 monthly living allowance to reflect the monthly pay of local Nigerians for work comparable to that done by volunteers, and a reduction in the number of motorbikes allocated for volunteers for official travel "in the Nigerian bush country." Vaughn traveled to Nigeria and spent three weeks traveling the country to meet in small groups with about 600 of the 699 volunteers in country to re-establish "a missing dialogue" between Volunteers and Washington Staff.

Vaughn cut to the crux of the matter when he met with Peace Corps Staff in Nigeria. "I never get letters of complaint from Volunteers who are busy doing something," Vaughn said, "who are teaching thirty hours a week." Vaughn thought that too many volunteers were more concerned with proposed reductions in the living allowances, vehicle restrictions, and the closing of hostels than with the work they had come to do. "Stay where the Nigerians stay," said Vaughn. "The Peace Corps is not in the hotel business. Forget the motorbikes the Peace Corps gave you in a period of misguided generosity. Travel with the Africans or better yet stay in your town and get to know the people rather than escaping on weekends to visit other volunteers." Vaughn traveled with two reporters from the "Peace Corps Volunteer" magazine, a monthly magazine that went out to Peace Corps Volunteers worldwide. The December, 1966 issue of "Peace Corps Volunteer" contained a report on Vaughn's trip and the issues in Nigeria.

=== Program improvements ===
The weaknesses in the Nigeria program confirmed Vaughn's worst suspicions about the need to improve the quality of Peace Corps programs. "We've got to do better on recruitment, in administration, orchestration, and approach," said Vaughn. Vaughn's biggest contribution to the Peace Corps was the effort he put into making program development in the field and program review and evaluation at Washington Headquarters into a professional process. One of Vaughn's first actions, taken in March, 1966, was to create the Peace Corps' Office of Planning and Program Review. Vaughn spent two years reappraising overseas operations, administration, training, and selection and created a more efficient programming mechanism. Vaughn made sure that the emphasis was shifted in the Peace Corps from how many volunteers were working to what the volunteers were doing and how well were they doing it.

=== Peace Corps and the Vietnam War ===
When Vaughn appeared at the University of Wisconsin–Madison on March 11, 1966, about 150 protesters interrupted his speech three times. The protesters included members of the local chapters of the "Committee to End the War in Vietnam" and the Students for a Democratic Society. Many volunteers also disagreed with United States policy during the Vietnam war, and some members of Congress thought that volunteers should be required to support United States policy while they were serving overseas. Vaughn defended the rights of Peace Corps volunteers. "[Secretary of State] Dean Rusk has said repeatedly that Peace Corps volunteers are not a part of United States foreign policy," said Vaughn in testimony before Congress. Representative Otto Passman said that Vaughn should either resign or be dismissed because he would not require volunteers to support foreign policy, especially Vietnam.

However, dissent had its limits for Peace Corps volunteers. In 1967 Bruce Murray, a Peace Corps Volunteer serving in Chile, helped draw up a petition that called for a cessation of the bombing of North Vietnam and immediate negotiations for peace. Murray said his petition was for publication in the New York Times. The petition was never published in the Times. Murray allegedly translated the petition to Spanish and gave it to "El Sur," a Chilean newspaper. Ralph Dungan, the US ambassador to Chile at the time, said the petition was a "clear violation" of standard State Department procedures and that volunteers had been cautioned about limiting their modes of expressing their opinion. Dungan told volunteers to voice their views to their Congressmen or to the President. Murray was dismissed from the Peace Corps for violating State Department regulations governing political conduct overseas. On July 19, 1967, Vaughn clarified Peace Corps policy on writing letters to newspapers on political issues and said that volunteers could now identify themselves as Peace Corps volunteers in letters to newspapers. The old policy permitted identification by name only. The new policy would not have made any difference in the discharge of Murray because his activities involved the use of a newspaper in a host country.

One of the fallouts of the anti-government stance of many young people was a decline in applications to join the Peace Corps. A Harris poll conducted with college students in 1968 found that "One-quarter of the seniors agree that 'a lot of people who might have joined the Peace Corps a few years ago are staying away because of their opposition to United States policy in Vietnam." "An increasing number of people are saying, 'since we do not or have not been able to solve our own problems, perhaps we had better focus more attention and resources on our own problems at home before we continue our effort to save the world,'" said Vaughn.

=== Peace Corps and the draft ===
Former US Marine Officer Vaughn took an active role in seeking deferments for Peace Corps Volunteers subject to the draft. "We have a serious situation," said Vaughn. "The problem of induction notices to overseas volunteers in becoming a major concern for us. Pulling a volunteer off a productive job at midtour is unfair to the nation, to the host country, the Peace Corps, and the individual." Even though service in the Peace Corps did not relieve a male volunteer of his military obligation, some Selective Service Boards had granted deferments for the two years of voluntary service as being in the national interest. After 25 volunteers were called home for induction Vaughn said he would take an active role in seeking deferments before the Presidential Appeal Board - the court of last resort for draft reclassification.

=== Nonpartisan support for the Peace Corps ===
As a lifelong Republican appointed to head the Peace Corps by a Democratic president, Vaughn exemplified the non-partisan basis of the Peace Corps and the support the agency had from both political parties. Vaughn recounted how he had met with Republican Senator Barry Goldwater, the conservative candidate for president in 1964, at a senior staff meeting. "After serious questioning on what Kennedy's new agency was all about, Arizona's Goldwater swore that the Peace Corps embodied virtually every one of the most noble aspects and values of the Republican Party," wrote Vaughn.

== Ambassador to Colombia ==
When Richard Nixon became president in 1969, Vaughn found himself out of a job. One report says that Vaughn was asked by Nixon's Secretary of State William P. Rogers to stay on as Peace Corps director to emphasize the nonpolitical nature of the Peace Corps. Instead, Vaughn was informed in March, 1969, that he would be replaced after all and reports that Vaughn had been asked to stay on as Peace Corps director in the Nixon administration were reported in the media to be untrue. "I was the first bureaucrat Nixon fired when he took office," Vaughn said. "But when he found out I was a Republican, he asked me if I'd be his ambassador to Colombia."

On May 2, 1969, President Nixon announced the appointment of Vaughn as Ambassador to Colombia. No major diplomatic initiatives took place with Colombia during Vaughn's ambassadorship there. Vaughn saw his role more as a "good will ambassador" and made many efforts to help the United States be seen in a positive light. For example, while Ambassador to Colombia, Vaughn, a former boxer, refereed boxing matches for the flyweight, lightweight, and middleweight finals in the Colombian National amateur championships held in Cartagena. Vaughn held a license to referee professional fights in the United States and so as a courtesy, Colombia granted Vaughn a reciprocal license to referee in Colombia. Vaughn noted that one difference from the United States is that the referee in Colombia is not allowed to touch the fighters when calling on them to break a clinch. Vaughn stopped the lightweight match with only 41 seconds to go in the final round to have a doctor examine a cut over one fighter's eye and the fight was stopped. Vaughn is said to be the only US diplomat to referee a fight while serving as Ambassador and declared that he was much impressed with the caliber of the fighters in Colombia.

Vaughn announced his resignation as Ambassador to Colombia on June 11, 1970, to return to private life. It was reported in the New York Times that Vaughn was leaving because he was in disagreement with Nixon's Latin American policies. However, a State Department spokesman said the Vaughn was resigning "for personal reasons" adding that "There is no disagreement over policy."

== Post-government activities ==
=== Head of National Urban Coalition, Planned Parenthood ===
On October 8, 1970, Vaughn was named President of the National Urban Coalition replacing John W. Gardner, former Secretary of Health Education and Welfare. Vaughn's responsibilities as chief executive officer of the organization were to run day-to-day operations of the coalition's chapters in 48 cities in the United States. From 1972 to 1975 Vaughn was Dean of International Studies at Florida International University in Miami, Florida. From 1972 to 1975 Vaughn was named to head the overseas development staff for Children's Television Workshop, a unit of National Educational Television, producers of Sesame Street and The Electric Company. Vaughn was President of Planned Parenthood from 1974 to 1975. From 1977 to 1979 Vaughn was Vice-President of Development and Resource Corporation for Iran. From 1979 to 1980 Vaughn was Assistant Administrator for Latin America Designate for USAID. From 1980 to 1982 Vaughn was President of Pierce Energy Corporation. From 1983 to 1986 Vaughn was vice-president, private sector projects for Development Associates. From 1986 to 1988 Vaughn was vice-president, government relations and finance for Conservation International. Vaughn was chairman of Ecotrust, a conservation organization committed to strengthening communities and the environment.

=== Confirmation hearings for Gaddi Vasquez ===
Vaughn opposed the George W. Bush's nomination of Gaddi Vasquez to become Peace Corps director in 2001. "As they say on the racing tout sheet for a horse that is not in the running: 'Nothing to recommend,'" Vaughn said. "He has little experience . . . and little to indicate that he understands how to run the Peace Corps or any international organization. It's clearly a political payoff, and it would be a shame to see him approved." As a Republican it pained Vaughn to have to oppose a nominee by a Republican president, but Vaughn came to Washington on his own and appeared before the Senate Foreign Relations Committee to speak out against the appointment of Vasquez. However Vasquez cleared the United States Senate Foreign Relations committee by a vote of 14–4, and was accepted in the full Senate on a voice vote.

=== Continued Support for the Peace Corps ===
On February 28, 2008, Vaughn published an op-ed in the Tucson Citizen supporting expansion of the Peace Corps and defending the relevance of the Peace Corps in today's world. "What the Peace Corps set out as its goals in 1961 coincides almost exactly with what most of our presidential candidates in 2008 have promised to seek at home, e.g. bringing real change, better health care, improved environmental protection, peace by means other than bludgeoning, burnishing the U.S. image abroad (an area in which the Peace Corps has no rival), promoting nonpartisan solutions, better education at all levels, with a major focus on helping the poor and disadvantaged," wrote Vaughn. "Is there a chance our next president, having talked the Peace Corps talk so faithfully and so long, will be able to stay real and walk the Peace Corps walk (while increasing the Peace Corps budget)?"

== Personal life ==
Vaughn's first marriage to the former Joanne Cordes Smith ended in divorce. Vaughn married Margaret Anne Weld on October 21, 1970. Weld had served as a Peace Corps Volunteer in Chad and was on Vaughn's personal staff when he was Director of the Peace Corps. Weld, known by her nickname "Leftie," was later on the public affairs staff at Peace Corps Headquarters in Washington. He is the father of Kathryn Vaughn Tolstoy and Carol Blair Vaughn by his first wife and Jack Hood Vaughn Jr. and Jane Vaughn Constantineau with his second wife.

In 1988 Vaughn made headlines while visiting New York City when Vaughn, then 67, defended himself during an attempted mugging as Vaughn left his hotel in midtown Manhattan after midnight to get a newspaper. Former professional prizefighter Vaughn hit the would-be mugger in the jaw leaving the mugger face down on the sidewalk. "This fellow came up behind me, put his arm around my waist, pinned my right arm to my side, and tried to remove my wallet," says Vaughn. "I hit him in the throat with my elbow. Then I kneed him in the groin and hit him in the jaw about five times. He was jackknifed on his face on the sidewalk as I walked away." "On several occasions I've had to straighten people out," Vaughn added.

In 1992 Vaughn and his wife moved to Tucson. Vaughn, at 87, still kept in shape by shadow boxing and running in place. "I have an unbelievable left hook," says Vaughn. "Sometimes I shadow box, pretending I'm hitting certain politicians."

Vaughn's son, also named Jack Vaughn, is a record producer who has run his own label, Slimstyle Records, and now heads Comedy Central's record label. In a 2006 story in the Wall Street Journal, Vaughn said that since 2002, Comedy Central Records have gradually increased to about 10 releases a year. "We make money on 80% to 90% of our releases," Vaughn says. Industry insiders call this a good percentage since most new releases in the music industry lose money. The younger Vaughn went to high school in Guatemala while his father was a diplomat working there. "It was a terrific cultural experience, but for a teen-ager with Embassy restrictions, it was boring and dangerous," said the younger Vaughn.

Jack Vaughn died at his home in Tucson on October 29, 2012, following a bout of cancer. He was 92.

== Kill The Gringo ==
Kill the Gringo, is a memoir written by Jack Hood Vaughn and his daughter Jane Weld Constantineau. Vaughn began writing Kill the Gringo in 1992, but due to his death on October 29, 2012, it was finished by Jane. This memoir goes through the things Vaughn did in his life, including boxing, military, politics, and personal life.

== Citations ==
Diplomatic posts
Preceded by post recreated	United States Ambassador to Panama; 1964–1965	Succeeded by Charles W. Adair Jr.
Preceded by Reynold E. Carlson	United States Ambassador to Colombia; 1969–1970	Succeeded by Leonard J. Saccio
Government offices
Preceded by Thomas C. Mann	Assistant Secretary of State for Inter-American Affairs; March 22, 1965 – February 28, 1966	Succeeded by Lincoln Gordon
Preceded by Sargent Shriver	Director of the Peace Corps; 1966–1969	Succeeded by Joseph Blatchford
