= John Hugh Crimmins =

American diplomat

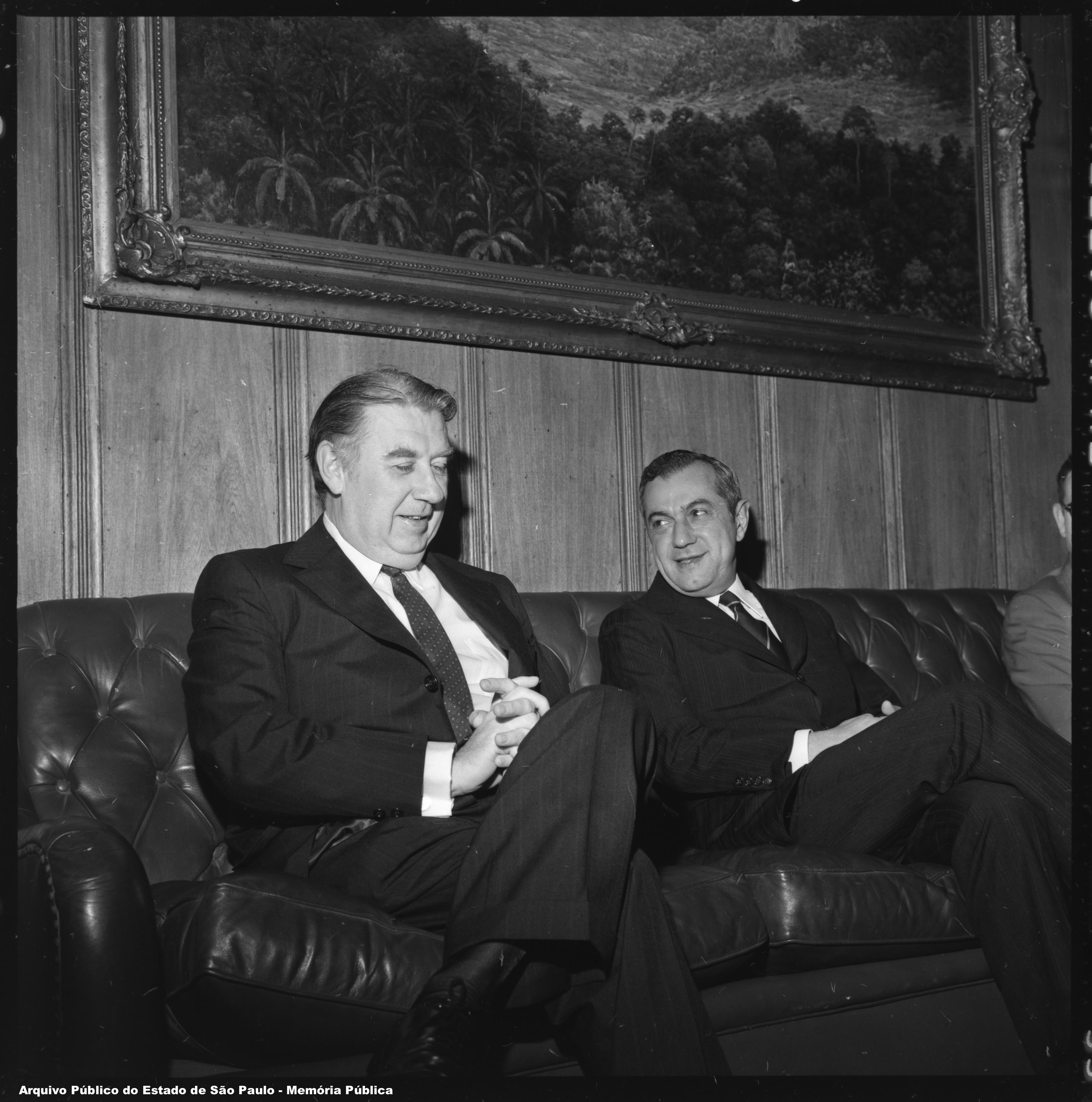
- John Hugh Crimmins and Laudo Natel, governor of São Paulo state, 1973. Arquivo Público do Estado de São Paulo
- Born: November 26, 1919; Worcester, Massachusetts, U.S.
- Died: December 12, 2007 (aged 88); Mitchellville, Maryland, U.S.
- Occupations: Diplomat, United States Ambassador

John Hugh Crimmins (November 26, 1919 – December 12, 2007) was a diplomat and former United States Ambassador to Dominican Republic (1966–69) and Brazil (1973–78). He was a member of the American Academy of Diplomacy.

He graduated from Harvard University in 1941. During World War II he served with the army in the Pacific theatre of operations. He was buried in Arlington National Cemetery.

Diplomatic posts
Preceded by W. Tapley Bennett, Jr.	United States Ambassador to the Dominican Republic; 1966–1969	Succeeded by Francis E. Meloy, Jr.
Preceded by William M. Rountree	United States Ambassador to Brazil; 1973–1978	Succeeded by Robert M. Sayre
