= Robert M. Sayre =

American diplomat

Robert Sayre
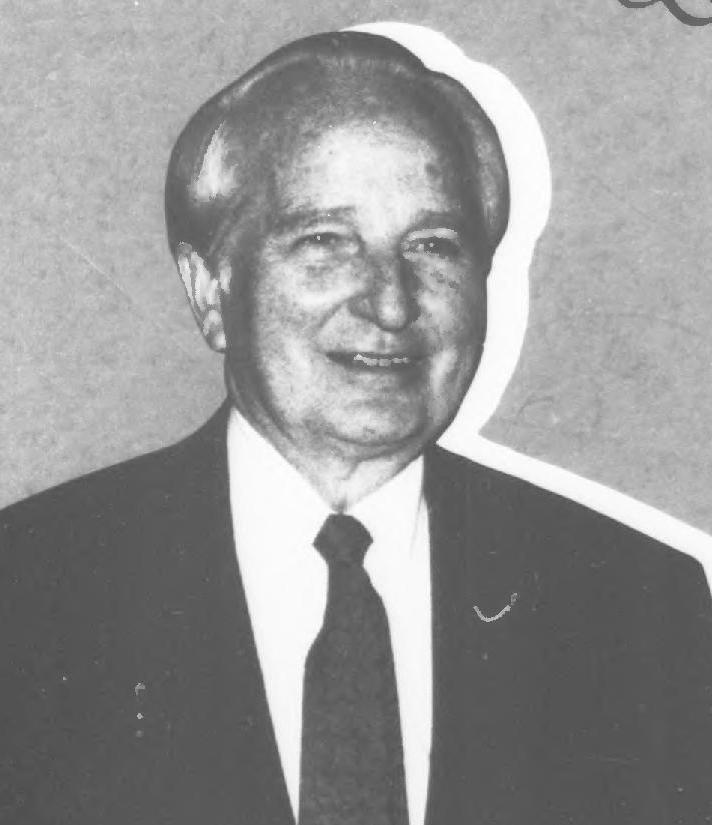
- Sayre in June 1990

4th Coordinator for Counterterrorism
- In office May 11, 1982 – September 10, 1984
- President: Ronald Reagan
- Preceded by: Anthony Quainton
- Succeeded by: Robert B. Oakley

United States Ambassador to Brazil
- In office June 8, 1978 – September 19, 1981
- President: Jimmy Carter; Ronald Reagan
- Preceded by: John Crimmins
- Succeeded by: Tony Motley

8th Inspector General of the Department of State
- In office November 25, 1975 – May 1, 1978
- President: Gerald Ford; Jimmy Carter
- Preceded by: William Schaufele
- Succeeded by: Theodore L. Eliot Jr.

United States Ambassador to Panama
- In office October 31, 1969 – March 14, 1974
- President: Richard Nixon
- Preceded by: Charles Adair
- Succeeded by: William Jorden

United States Ambassador to Uruguay
- In office August 27, 1968 – October 19, 1969
- President: Lyndon B. Johnson; Richard Nixon
- Preceded by: Henry Hoyt
- Succeeded by: Charles Adair

Personal details
- Born: Robert Marion Sayre; August 18, 1924 Hillsboro, Oregon, U.S.
- Died: March 31, 2016 (aged 91) Fairfax, Virginia, U.S.
- Education: Willamette University (BA); Stanford University (MA); George Washington University (JD)

Robert Marion Sayre (August 18, 1924 – March 31, 2016) was a United States State Department official and ambassador to Brazil, Panama and Uruguay. A career foreign service officer specializing in Latin American affairs, Sayre served as the United States Ambassador to Uruguay from 1968 to 1969, Ambassador to Panama from 1969 to 1974, and Ambassador to Brazil from 1978 to 1981. He also held the position of Inspector General of the U.S. State Department from 1974 to 1978.

== Early life ==
He was born in Hillsboro, Oregon, on August 18, 1924. He served in the United States Army from 1942 to 1946, during World War II. In 1949, Sayre earned a bachelor's degree from Willamette University in Salem, Oregon, followed by master's degree in 1960 from Stanford University. He then graduated from George Washington University Law School with a JD in 1956.

== Career ==
Sayre started at the State Department in 1949 as an intern. He then worked his way up in the State Department, serving in various roles. These included serving on the United States Security Council from 1964 to 1965, as the Deputy Assistant Secretary for the Bureau of Inter-American Affairs from 1965 to 1967, and then as Assistant Secretary for Inter-American Affairs from 1967 to 1968. He served as the U.S. ambassador to Uruguay from 1968 to 1969, and to Panama from 1969 to 1974. On February 9, 1978, President Jimmy Carter nominated Sayre to serve as the ambassador to Brazil. Sayre served as ambassador to Brazil from 1978 to 1981, followed by United States Coordinator for Counterterrorism from 1982 to 1984. He also served as the Inspector General of the Foreign Service.

Sayre died on March 31, 2016, in Fairfax, Virginia, at the age of 91.

Diplomatic posts
| Preceded by Henry Hoyt | United States Ambassador to Uruguay; 1968–1969 | Succeeded by Charles Adair |
| Preceded by Charles Adair | United States Ambassador to Panama; 1969–1974 | Succeeded by William Jorden |
| Preceded by John Crimmins | United States Ambassador to Brazil; 1978–1981 | Succeeded by Tony Motley |
