= Panama–United States relations =

- Panama: United States

Panama and the United States cooperate in promoting economic, political, security, and social development through international agencies.

According to the 2012 U.S. Global Leadership Report, 32% of Panamanian people approve of U.S. leadership, with 16% disapproving and 52% uncertain.

== 19th-century history (1800–1899) ==
=== Panama ===
President James Polk's ambassador to the Republic of New Granada, Benjamin Alden Bidlack, negotiated the Mallarino–Bidlack Treaty with the government of New Granada in 1846. Though Bidlack had initially only sought to remove tariffs on American goods, Bidlack and New Granadan Foreign Minister Manuel María Mallarino negotiated a broader agreement that deepened military and trade ties between the two countries. The treaty also allowed for the construction of the Panama Railway. In an era of slow overland travel, the treaty gave the United States a route to more rapidly travel between its eastern and western coasts. In exchange, Washington guaranteed New Granada's sovereignty over the Isthmus of Panama. The treaty won ratification in both countries in 1848. The agreement helped to establish a stronger American influence in the region, as the Polk administration sought to ensure that Great Britain would not dominate Central America. The United States would use the Mallarino-Bidlack Treaty as justification for numerous military interventions in Panama.

== 20th-century history (1900–1999) ==
=== Independence of Panama and US intervention ===
The United States first attempted to acquire control of a canal on the Panamanian isthmus via the Hay-Herran Treaty of 1903, but the treaty was not ratified. Desperate to construct a canal, the United States saw the separatist movement as an opportunity. Despite the Bidlack-Mallarino Treaty of 1846 in which the United States would intervene in the event of a disorder between Panama and Colombia in Colombia's favor, the United States prevented Colombian forces from moving across the isthmus to stop the Panamanian uprising. On November 4, 1903, the immediate support of the USA secured the Declaration of Independence of Panama from Colombia. In return, Panama signed the Hay–Bunau-Varilla Treaty three weeks later, granting the USA sovereign rights over the interoceanic canal that would be built over the following decade.

=== Relations during the 20th century ===
The evolution of the relation between Panama and the USA has followed the pattern of a Panamanian project for the recovering of the territory of the Canal of Panama, a project which became public after the events of May 21, 1958, November 3, 1959, and then on January 9, 1964. The latter day is known in Panama as the Martyrs' Day (Panama), in which a riot over the right to raise the Panamanian flag in an American school became the vicinity of the Panama Canal.

The following years saw a lengthy negotiation process with the United States, culminating with the Torrijos–Carter Treaties, in which the transfer of the Panama Canal to Panama was set to be completed in December 1999. The process of transition, however, was made difficult by the existence of the de facto military rule of Manuel Noriega in Panama from 1982 to 1989.

The 1977 Panama Canal Treaties entered into force on October 1, 1979. They replaced the 1903 Hay–Bunau-Varilla Treaty between the United States and Panama (modified in 1936 and 1955), and all other U.S.-Panama agreements concerning the Panama Canal, which were in force on that date. The treaties comprise a basic treaty governing the operation and defense of the Canal from October 1, 1979, to December 31, 1999 (Panama Canal Treaty) and a treaty guaranteeing the permanent neutrality of the Canal (Neutrality Treaty).

The details of the arrangements for U.S. operation and defense of the Canal under the Panama Canal Treaty are spelled out in separate implementing agreements. The Canal Zone and its government ceased to exist when the treaties entered into force and Panama assumed complete jurisdiction over Canal Zone territories and functions, a process which was finalized on December 31, 1999.

=== United States invasion of Panama ===
On December 20, 1989, in order to arrest Manuel Noriega, the United States invaded Panama. The military intervention helped to swear into power the winners of the elections of May 1989, President Guillermo Endara.

The History of the Relations between Panama and the USA are a mandatory course in the curriculum of Public High School in Panama.

== 21st-century history (2000–present) ==
The United States cooperates with the Panamanian government in promoting economic, political, security, and social development through U.S. and international agencies. Cultural ties between the two countries are strong and many Panamanians go to the United States for higher education and advanced training. In 2007, the U.S. and Panama partnered to launch a regional health worker training center. The center provides training to community healthcare workers in Panama and throughout Central America. About 25,000 American citizens reside in Panama, many are retirees from the Panama Canal Commission and individuals who hold dual nationality. There is also a rapidly growing enclave of American retirees in the Chiriquí Province in western Panama.

Panama continues to fight against the illegal narcotics and arms trade. The country's proximity to major cocaine-producing nations and its role as a commercial and financial crossroads make it a country of special importance in this regard. The Panamanian Government has concluded agreements with the U.S. on maritime law enforcement, counter-terrorism, counter-narcotics, and stolen vehicles. A three-year investigation by the Drug Prosecutors Office (DPO), the PTJ, and several other law enforcement agencies in the region culminated in the May 2006 arrest in Brazil of Pablo Rayo Montano, a Colombian-born drug crime boss. Assets located in Panama belonging to his drug cartel were among those seized by the Government of Panama following his indictment by a U.S. federal court in Miami. In March 2007, the United States Coast Guard, in cooperation with the Government of Panama, seized over 38,000 lbs. of cocaine off the coast of Panama, the largest drug seizure in the eastern Pacific. Panama signed the Lima Declaration, which has been signed by multiple Latin American countries. The document is a collective rejection of Venezuela's Constituent Assembly and identifies president Maduro of Venezuela as a dictator. In the beginning of August 2017, Vice President Pence visited Panama City, Panama to give a joint statement with President Varela regarding the two countries joint efforts to restore democracy in Venezuela, but more importantly reflect on the relationship between the two countries.

In the economic investment arena, the Panamanian government has been successful in the enforcement of intellectual property rights as well as has concluded a Bilateral Investment Treaty Amendment with the United States and an agreement with the Overseas Private Investment Corporation. Although money laundering remains a problem, Panama passed significant reforms in 2000 intended to strengthen its cooperation against international financial crimes.

In January 2005, Panama sent election supervisors to Iraq as part of the International Mission for Iraqi Elections to monitor the national elections.

In 2015, former Panamanian president Ricardo Martinelli fled to the United States and asked for asylum. Despite a Panamanian request for extradition on wiretapping charges, Martinelli was only arrested in June 2017 and extradited in June 2018. The delay caused critics in Panama to question about American interference. The United States also worked against improving relations between Panama and China. When a Chinese container ship became the first ship to pass through the new Panama Canal locks in June 2016, US Ambassador John D. Feeley arranged for a US Navy ship to be stationed in view of the Chinese ship. While Feeley expressed concerns about Panamanian plans to establish diplomatic relations with China, Panamanian President Juan Carlos Varela denied that anything was happening. Negotiations were held in Madrid and Beijing to escape surveillance by the US Embassy, and the US Ambassador was only told one hour before the public announcement. Ambassador Feeley also persuaded Panama's Security Ministry to deny the Chinese company Huawei a contract for communications technology, which was handed to the US company General Dynamics.

== Donald Trump's second presidency (2025–present) ==
U.S. President Donald Trump, Panamanian President José Raúl Mulino, and other leaders during the Shield of the Americas summit, March 2026

In late 2024 and in 2025, president-elect Donald Trump threatened to retake control of Panama Canal, stating the United States was “taking back” the canal while incorrectly claiming that China operated it, although there is a higher presence of Chinese companies around the canal.

On February 2, 2025, U.S. secretary of state Marco Rubio visited Panama and told Panamanian president José Raúl Mulino that Panama must reduce Chinese influence in the Panama Canal or face consequences; Panama stated that it would not renew its membership in China's Belt and Road Initiative following expiration.

In February 2025, Panama agreed to accept deportees from three countries under the Trump administration’s immigration policies. The U.S. deported thousands of undocumented migrants, including individuals from China, Pakistan, and Afghanistan, to Panama and Costa Rica, rather than their countries of origin. Analysts suggest Panama accepted these deportations under economic and political pressure, as Trump threatened tariffs and even suggested U.S. control over the Panama Canal. Deportees were housed in hotels and camps, with many refusing repatriation due to safety concerns. Many of these migrants, including families, were held in the remote San Vicente immigration center in the Darién jungle, with restricted access to legal counsel. Human rights organizations, including the ACLU, criticized the arrangement, citing due process violations and safety concerns. Panama’s President Jose Mulino provided limited responses when questioned about the situation, while the U.S. State Department emphasized that transit countries determine migrants' removability under their laws.

On January 2, 2026, President Mulino declared the crisis with the United States to be over, stating that "Panama moved toward a relationship of respect, restored trust, joint work, and friendship, and the canal remained Panamanian."

== Diplomatic relations between Panama and the U.S. ==
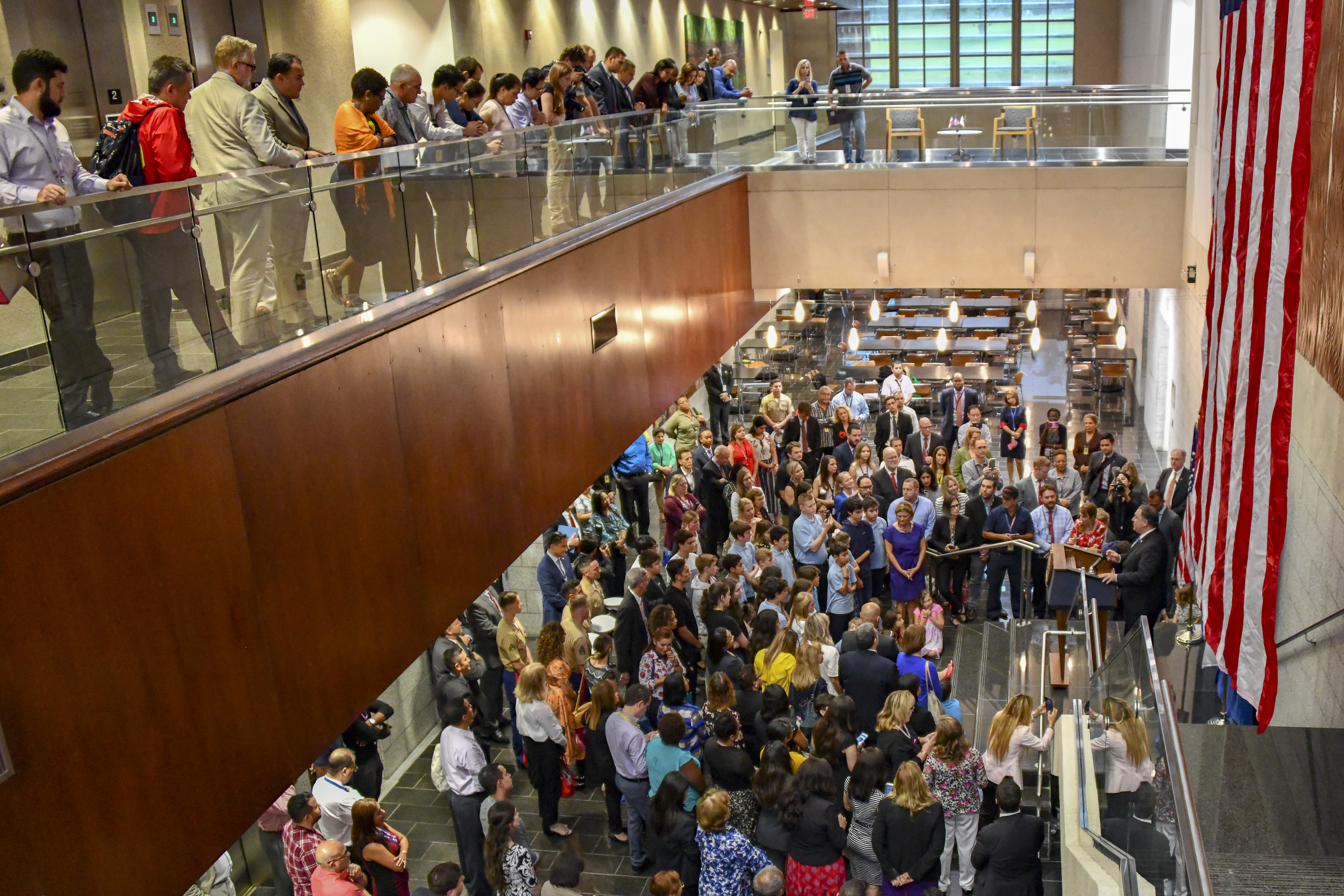
US Secretary of State Mike Pompeo speaks at the US embassy in Panama City in 2018

The U.S. Embassy in Panama is in Panama City, Panama. In 1938, the site in Avenida Balboa was leased from the Government of Panama for 99 years. The chancery building was constructed under the supervision of the Foreign Buildings Office of the Department of State in 1941. The total cost of the land and construction was $366,719. The first diplomatic mission of the United States of America in the Republic of Panama was established in 1904, the year after Panama achieved independence from Colombia on November 3, 1903. The first American Minister was William L. Buchanan of Covington, Ohio. For many years, The American Legation was for many years located at the corner of Central Avenue and Fourth Street. It was raised to Diplomatic mission status in 1939 and moved to its current location on April 2, 1942. The United States first established a consular office in Panama in 1823 when Panama was a department of Colombia. It became a Consulate General on September 3, 1884, and was combined with the Embassy on April 6, 1942. Earliest available records of the Consulate date from 1910 when the consulate was located in the Diario de Panama Building near the Presidential Palace. It was then moved to the Marina Building across from the Presidential Palace. It subsequently moved to several other buildings in Panama City, before coming to its current location in Building 783, Clayton. There is also a virtual post in Colon.

== Resident diplomatic missions ==
of Panama in the United States

- Washington, D.C. (Embassy)
- Houston (Consulate-General)
- Los Angeles (Consulate-General)
- Miami (Consulate-General)
- New Orleans (Consulate-General)
- New York City (Consulate-General)
- Philadelphia (Consulate-General)
- Tampa (Consulate-General)

of the United States in Panama

- Panama City (Embassy)

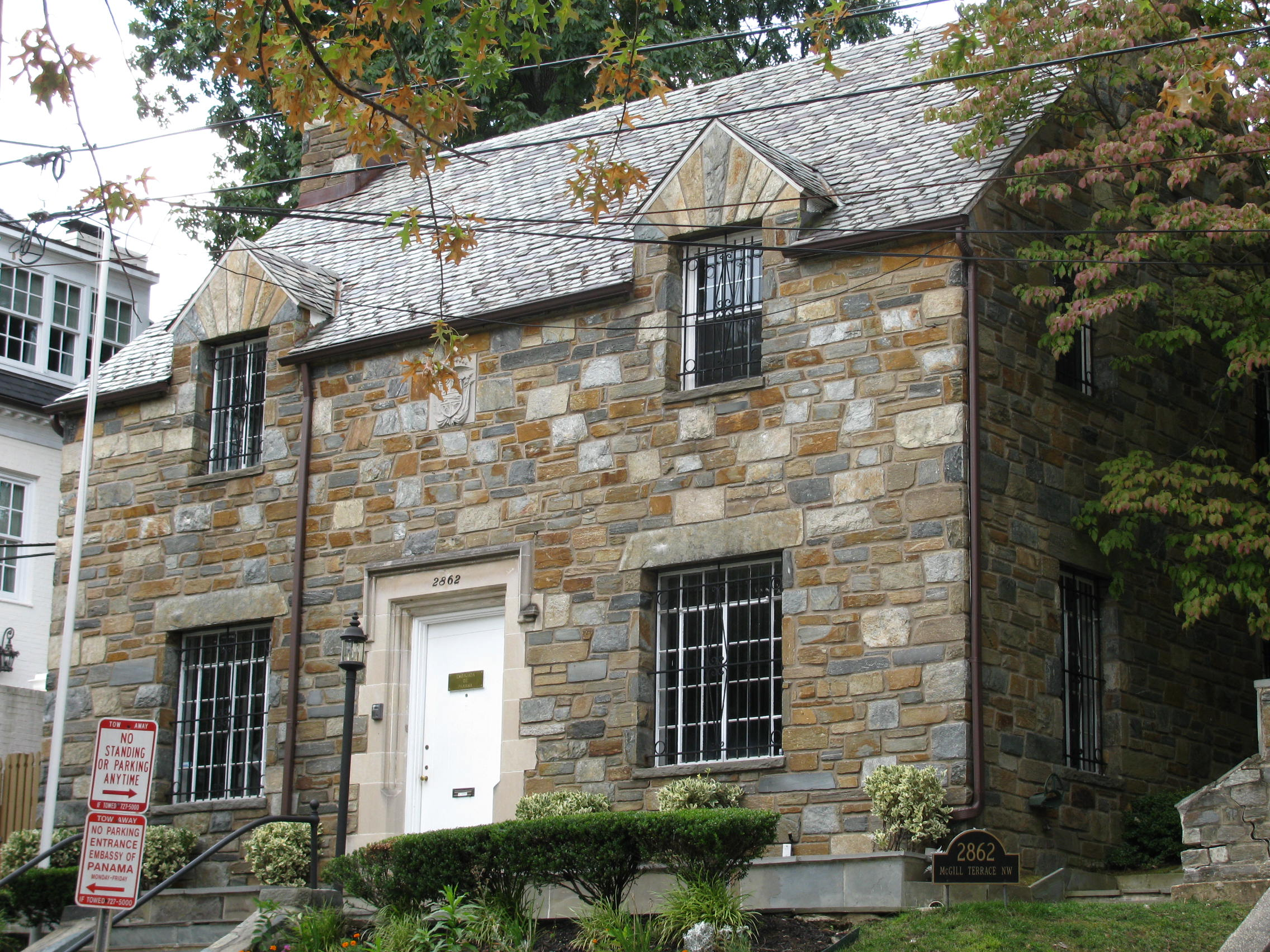
Embassy of Panama in Washington, D.C.

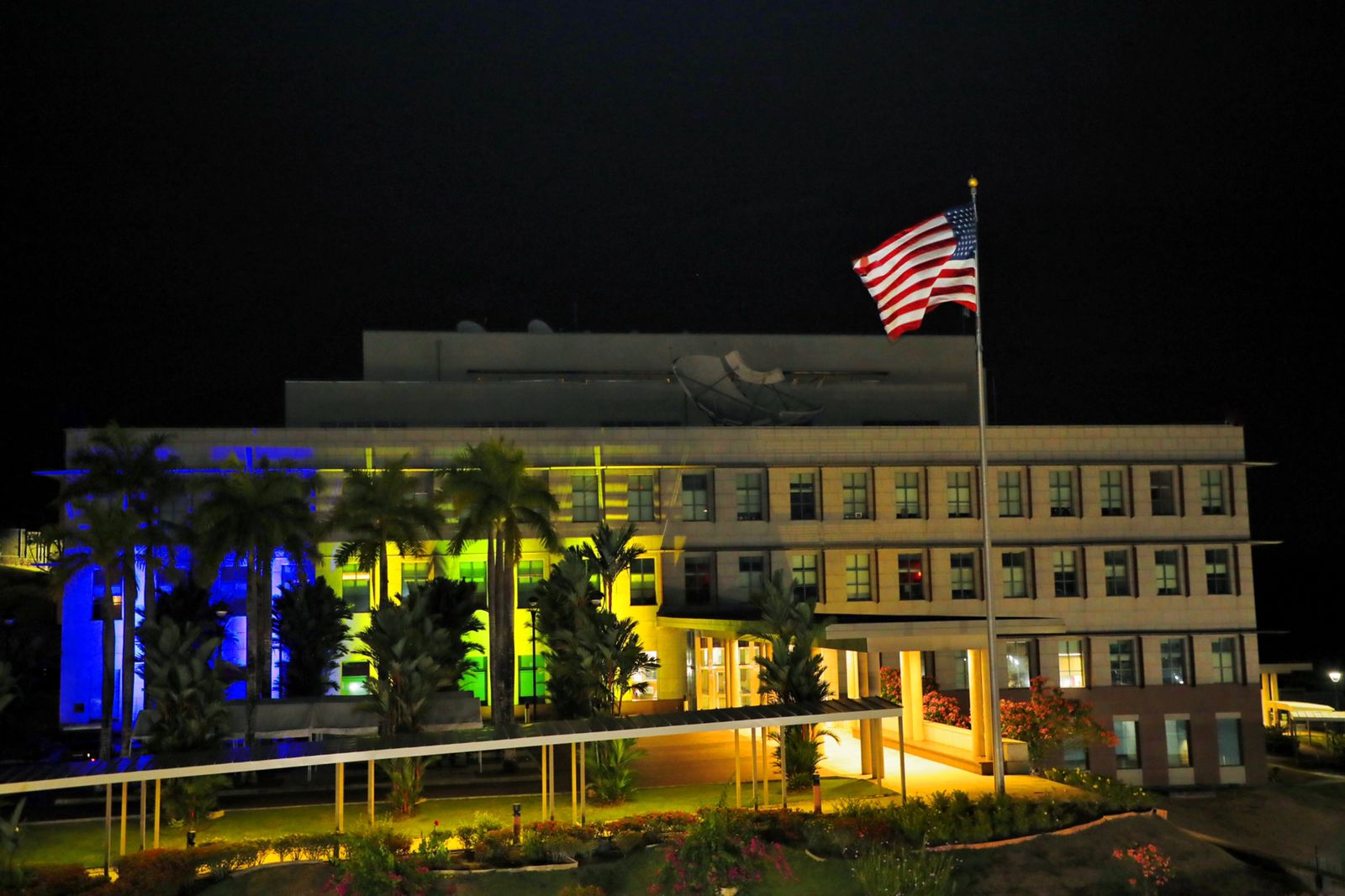
Embassy of the United States in Panama City

== See also ==
- Panamanian Americans
- List of ambassadors of the United States to Panama

== Sources ==
(This article incorporates text from this source, which is in the public domain.)
