= Jonathan D. Farrar =

American diplomat (born 1956)

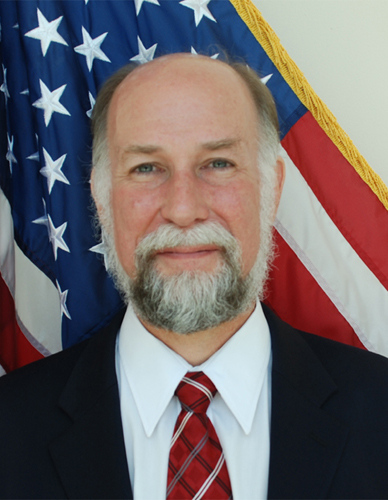

25th United States Ambassador to Panama
- In office May 15, 2012 – June 5, 2015
- President: Barack Obama
- Preceded by: Phyllis M. Powers
- Succeeded by: John D. Feeley

12th Chief of the U.S. Interests Section in Cuba
- In office July 2008 – September 2011
- President: George W. Bush; Barack Obama
- Preceded by: Michael E. Parmly
- Succeeded by: John Caulfield

Personal details
- Born: 1956 (age 69–70) Los Angeles, California, U.S.
- Profession: Diplomat

Jonathan Don Farrar (born 1956) is an American diplomat who was the United States Ambassador to the Republic of Panama from 2012 to 2015. He was previously the Chief of Mission of the United States Interests Section in Havana, Cuba, from July 2008 to September 2011.

== Background information ==
Farrar joined the U.S. State Department in 1980 as an economic officer, and is a career member of the Senior Foreign Service. He was born in Los Angeles, California, graduated from Covina High School, and studied at California State Polytechnic University, Pomona, Claremont Graduate University, and the Industrial College of the Armed Forces. Farrar is married and has three children.

== Career ==
Farrar's career includes extensive experience in Latin America. His most recent overseas posting was as the Deputy Chief of Mission in Montevideo, Uruguay. Farrar also served at the U.S. embassies in Mexico, Belize, and Paraguay.

Prior to assuming his position as USINT COM, Farrar served as the Principal Deputy Assistant Secretary of the State Department's Bureau of Democracy, Human Rights, and Labor (DRL), and was DRL's Acting Assistant Secretary from August 2007 to March 2008. In this capacity, Farrar oversaw DRL's human rights and democracy programs around the world, with a particular focus on Asia and the Western Hemisphere. From 2004 to 2005, Farrar served as a Deputy Assistant Secretary in the State Department's Bureau of International Narcotics and Law Enforcement Affairs (INL), with responsibility for INL's programs in the Western Hemisphere, Africa, Asia, and Europe.

Farrar has held a variety of domestic assignments in the State Department's Bureau of Western Hemisphere Affairs, including service as deputy director of the Office of Andean Affairs and as country desk officer for Argentina. Farrar served twice on the staff of the Under Secretary for Democracy and Global Affairs, most recently as chief of staff to the Under Secretary from 2002 to 2004.

Diplomatic posts
Preceded by post recreated	United States Ambassador to Panama; 2012–2015	Succeeded by John D. Feeley
