= The North-South Center =

Research center at the University of Miami

The North-South Center, later named The Dante B. Fascell North-South Center at the University of Miami in honor of former U.S. Congressman and House Foreign Affairs Committee chairman Dante Fascell, was an independent research and educational institution established in 1984 at the University of Miami in Coral Gables, Florida, United States. The North-South Center was closed by the university in December 2003.

== History ==
The North-South Center was established in 1984 by the U.S. Congress in 1984 as a division within the University of Miami's Graduate School of International Studies (GSIS) and later was affiliated with the University of Miami's Center for Advanced International Studies, which was closed by incoming University of Miami president Donna Shalala after her appointment and contract with the center were rejected by both Cuban-American lawmakers and University of Miami trustees.

In 1991, under an Act of Congress "to promote better relations between the United States and the nations of Latin America and the Caribbean and Canada through cooperative study, training, and research," the institute began receiving federal financial support.

The center's first dean was Ambler H. Moss, who also served as its director and who remained with the North-South Center until its closing in December 2003.

The center conducted research and outreach on a range of Inter-American issues, including democratic governance, security, trade and economic policy, sustainable development, migration, civil society participation, narcotics trafficking, and inter-American business and labor issues. From 1984 until 2000, the center served as the academic and operational home for the Journal of Interamerican Studies and World Affairs and its succeeding journal, Latin American Politics and Society. Through its in-house publishing arm, The North-South Center Press, the center published public policy research and commentary and developed collaborative projects with governmental and non-governmental partners in the United States, Latin America, the Caribbean, and Canada. Throughout the center's existence, its publications were distributed through Transaction Publishers and Lynne Rienner Publishers. The center's research, outreach activities, and published works played a role in framing policy dialogue for key decision-makers and scholars, and non-governmental activists throughout the Americas. Its most seminal publications are still used in university classrooms, government agencies, and non-governmental institutions as resources for education and policy decision-making.

=== Closure ===
The North-South Center was closed by the University of Miami at the end of 2003 after political objections emerged to the center's direction from South Florida's Cuban–American lobby. Miami Herald columnist Andrés Oppenheimer argued in his September 4, 2003 that the University of Miami's decision to close the center was "dubious" and asked, "Has there been a right-wing coup at the University of Miami?"

The North-South Center's closure was covered by the Associated Press, which reported: "Many observers speculated privately that the center received lukewarm support in the House of Representatives because it did not focus enough on Cuba and did not conform to more traditional Cuban exile ideological positions such as support for the trade embargo. "The existence of a center in Miami that is not right-wing concerns them," said Bernardo Benes, a former banker who has advocated dialogue with the Cuban government."

The Associated Press reported that, since its 1984 creation, the center had become "a respected public policy think tank specializing in Latin American and Caribbean issues including trade and economic policy, migration, security, public corruption, and the environment."
