= Phyllis M. Powers =

American diplomat

Phyllis Marie Powers
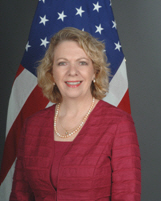

United States Ambassador to Nicaragua
- In office May 3, 2012 – August 5, 2015
- President: Barack Obama
- Preceded by: Robert Callahan
- Succeeded by: Laura Dogu

United States Ambassador to Panama
- In office September 16, 2010 – April 3, 2012
- President: Barack Obama
- Preceded by: Barbara Stephenson
- Succeeded by: Jonathan Farrar

Personal details
- Born: 1953 (age 72–73) Utica, New York, U.S.
- Education: Pennsylvania State University, University Park

Phyllis Marie Powers (born 1953) is a Career Ambassador within the United States Foreign Service and the former United States Ambassador to Nicaragua. She was previously the United States Ambassador to Panama, and also served in senior roles in the US Embassies in Iraq, Peru and Colombia.

== Education and early career ==
A native of Utica, New York, Powers graduated from Pennsylvania State University with a Bachelor's degree in biology and is certified by the American Society of Clinical Pathologists as a Medical Technologist. Prior to entering the Foreign Service, Powers was a Medical Technologist at Alexandria Hospital in Alexandria, Virginia.

== Diplomatic career ==
Powers entered the foreign service in 1978 and her early diplomatic career includes tours in Jordan, Russia, and Poland. In Washington, D.C., Ms. Powers served as Senior Post Management Officer for the Bureau of Near East Asia and South Asia, with oversight responsibility for Afghanistan, Pakistan, Bangladesh, and the Persian Gulf countries and as Deputy Director of the Office of Travel Support in the Bureau of Administration.

In 2004, Powers was posted in Colombia as the Director of the Narcotics Affairs Section responsible for the Counter-Narcotics program known as Plan Colombia. From 2005 until June 2007, she was Deputy Chief of Mission of the U. S. Embassy in Lima, Peru. From 2007 to 2009, Powers was Director of the Office of Provincial Affairs at the U.S. Embassy in Baghdad, Iraq.

In June 2010, Powers was nominated by President Barack Obama to be United States Ambassador to Panama with the rank of Minister-Counselor, and she was confirmed by the Senate on August 8, 2010.

In December 2011, when Jonathan D. Farrar's nomination to be US Ambassador to Nicaragua was stalled in the Senate, the President nominated Powers to be Ambassador in Managua and nominated Farrar to the post in Panama City. On March 30, 2012, Powers was confirmed as US Ambassador to Nicaragua.

Diplomatic posts
Preceded by Barbara Stephenson	United States Ambassador to Panama; 2010–2012	Succeeded by Jonathan Farrar
Preceded by Robert Callahan	United States Ambassador to Nicaragua; 2012–2015	Succeeded by Laura Dogu
