= Colleen A. Hoey =

American diplomat

Colleen Anne Hoey
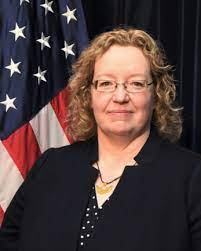

U.S. Chargé d’Affaires to Honduras
- Incumbent
- Assumed office June 23, 2025
- President: Donald Trump
- Preceded by: Laura Dogu
- In office August 30, 2019 – April 7, 2022
- President: Donald Trump; Joe Biden
- Preceded by: Heide B. Fulton
- Succeeded by: Laura Dogu

Personal details
- Education: Santa Clara University (BS); Georgetown University (MA); National Defense University (MA)

Colleen Anne Hoey is an American diplomat who is serving as the U.S. Chargé d'Affaires to Honduras, since June 23, 2025. She previously served in that position from 2019 to 2022, until she was replaced by Ambassador Laura Dogu. Hoey replaced Dogu, again, as chargé d'affaires after Dogu left office in 2025.

== Education ==
Hoey has a bachelor's degree in political science from Santa Clara University and a master's degree in government from Georgetown University. She also has a master's degree in national security and resource management from the National Defense University Dwight D. Eisenhower School for National Security and Resource Strategy.

== Political career ==
In 2019, Hoey met with President Juan Orlando Hernández. She seeks to strengthen Honduras–United States relations by fighting drug trafficking.
