= Kevin K. Sullivan =

American diplomat (born 1964)

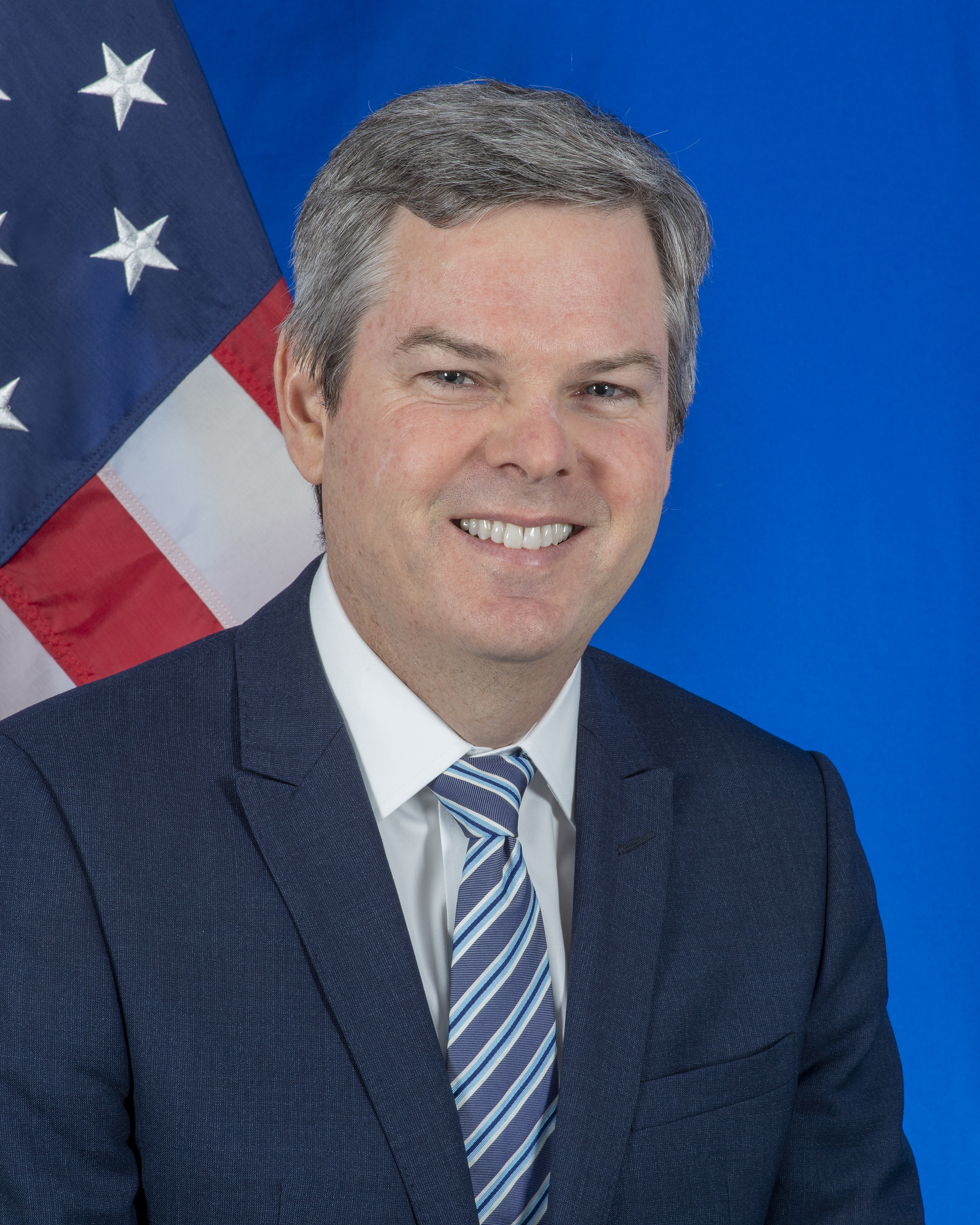

United States Ambassador to Nicaragua
- In office November 14, 2018 – May 19, 2023
- President: Donald Trump; Joe Biden
- Preceded by: Laura Farnsworth Dogu
- Succeeded by: Natasha Franceschi (2026)

Personal details
- Born: 1964 (age 61–62) Cleveland, Ohio, U.S.
- Spouse: Mariangeles Quinto
- Children: 2
- Education: Georgetown University (BA); Princeton University (MA)

Kevin K. Sullivan (born 1964) is an American diplomat and he was the United States Ambassador to Nicaragua.

== Education ==
Sullivan received a Bachelor of Arts degree from Georgetown University and a Master of Arts from Princeton University.

== Career ==
Sullivan is a career member of the Senior Foreign Service. He has been working for the State Department for over thirty years. He has served at multiple capacities including being the Deputy Chief of Mission at the U.S. Embassy in Malawi, Deputy Chief of Mission and Chargé d’Affaires at the U.S. Embassy in Argentina, Interim Permanent Representative for the US Mission to the Organization of American States and has worked in U.S. embassies in Chile, Gambia and Ethiopia.

=== United States Ambassador to Nicaragua ===
On July 11, 2018, President Donald Trump nominated Sullivan to be the next United States Ambassador to Nicaragua. On October 11, 2018, the Senate confirmed his nomination by voice vote. He presented his credentials to the President of Nicaragua on November 14, 2018.

== Personal life ==
Sullivan is married to Mariangeles Quinto and has a daughter and a son. He speaks fluent Spanish and basic French.

== See also ==
- List of ambassadors of the United States
- List of ambassadors appointed by Donald Trump

Diplomatic posts
| Preceded by Laura Farnsworth Dogu | United States Ambassador to Nicaragua; 2018–2023 | Succeeded by Natasha Franceschi |
