= John D. Feeley =

American diplomat (born 1961)

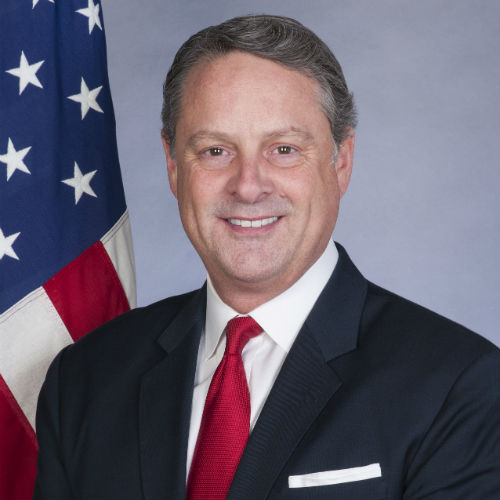

United States Ambassador to Panama
- In office December 9, 2015 – March 9, 2018
- President: Barack Obama; Donald Trump
- Preceded by: Jonathan D. Farrar
- Succeeded by: Mari Carmen Aponte (2022)

Personal details
- Born: 1961 (age 64–65)
- Education: Regis High School
- Alma mater: Georgetown University School of Foreign Service; National War College
- Profession: Diplomat

Military service
- Allegiance: United States
- Branch/service: United States Marine Corps
- Years of service: 1983–1990
- Rank: Captain

John D. Feeley (born 1961) is an American diplomat. He was the United States Ambassador to the Republic of Panama from 2015 until his resignation took effect on March 9, 2018.

== Early life and education ==
Feeley's mother was a professor of English. He is an Eagle Scout. He graduated from Regis High School in 1979, and earned B.S. at Georgetown University School of Foreign Service in 1983. Feeley served in the United States Marine Corps from 1983 to 1990. He flew amphibious assault helicopters in and over Lebanon in the mid-1980s following the 1983 bombing of the Marine Barracks in Beirut. He also flew them from Navy ships in the Atlantic and the Caribbean. He became a captain. He earned his M.A. from the National War College in 2004. Feeley is married to Cherie Feeley, who is also a U.S. diplomat, and they have two children. He speaks fluent Spanish.

== Career ==
Feeley joined the U.S. Department of State in 1990. He is a career member of the Senior Foreign Service. His career includes extensive experience in Latin American affairs, either at the Department of State in Washington, D.C., and on assignments overseas. From 2004 to 2006, he was a Deputy Executive Secretary in the Office of the Secretary of State, where he managed information flow for Secretaries of State Colin Powell and Condoleezza Rice. He was Deputy Chief of Mission in Mexico from 2009 to 2012. He has also held the positions of Director for Central American Affairs and Deputy Director for Caribbean Affairs. He served as the Summit of the Americas Coordinator, overseeing preparation for U.S. participation in the 2012 Cartagena Summit. Then as Principal Deputy Assistant Secretary for Western Hemisphere Affairs he had responsibility for the daily management of policy implementation and the supervision of 53 diplomatic posts. Other overseas postings have included the Dominican Republic and Colombia.

In September 2014, he assessed the development of LGBT rights in Latin America saying "It is the cultural heritage of machismo, which is a bad thing in many ways ... not just in the manifestation of anti-LGBT attitudes". He added: "We have seen in some places — Argentina, Uruguay — some very progressive, advanced thinking". He expressed support for Wally Brewster, whose nomination to be Ambassador to the Dominican Republic was encountering opposition because he was in a same-sex marriage.

President Obama nominated him to be Ambassador to Panama on July 28, 2015, and the United States Senate approved the nomination on December 9, 2015. He presented his credentials to Juan Carlos Varela, President of Panama, and Isabel de Saint Malo de Alvarado, Minister of Foreign Affairs, on February 16, 2016.

Feeley resigned on December 27, 2017, effective March 9, 2018, due to policy differences with the Trump administration.

== See also ==
- List of ambassadors of the United States

Diplomatic posts
Preceded by Jonathan D. Farrar	United States Ambassador to Panama; 2015–2018	Succeeded by Roxanne Cabral chargé d’affaires
