= Project Handclasp =

Humanitarian project of the US Navy

Date	since 1962
Location	worldwide

Project Handclasp was a humanitarian foreign assistance program of the United States Navy, started in 1962, that distributed materials and medical help. The OPNAVINST authorizing the program was formally cancelled in 2022. It served as a public relations program for U.S. Navy personnel in foreign countries and more broadly as a counterinsurgency organization; all branches of the U.S. military have a civic action program for this purpose.

== History ==
During the Vietnam War, Project Handclasp was a formal U.S. Navy program that coordinated the transportation and delivery of humanitarian and educational items to foreign countries on a space-available basis. It succeeded an earlier program, called Operation Handclasp, that in the 1950s had the explicit purpose of waging the Cold War by humanitarian means. Starting in 1963, the program sent medical teams, food, and various other supplies to Vietnam, becoming part of a "politicization of medicine" that by 1966 had become an outright pro-South Vietnam propaganda operation.

In collaboration with the Project Handclasp Foundation, Inc., U.S. embassies, American charities, and foreign organizations, the U.S. Navy provides free transportation and storage of donated materials from various American charities to countries that have asked for assistance. U.S. embassies, or U.S. country teams, coordinate with the host country about the relief work and materials to be provided ensuring that the help given is truly useful to the host country. The actual items are delivered directly by U.S. Sailors and Marines, giving them a chance to interact with the local people, building relationships and strengthening trust between the United States and the host nations. Notable among such charities was Pat Robertson's Operation Blessing, which used the program for the additional purpose of "keep[ing] them [U.S. sailors] out of the bars". Relations with evangelical charities in fact date back to 1959, when the predecessor Operation Handclasp shipped goods for World Vision.

The primary purpose of Project Handclasp was to receive, collect, consolidate, and store humanitarian, educational, and goodwill material for transportation on naval vessels and distribution by U.S. Navy and Marine Corps personnel on behalf of American citizens to needy people overseas. As a secondary purpose, Project Handclasp accepted and arranged space-available transportation of consigned material from organizations or individuals who desire transportation to specified recipient organizations overseas. The types of material considered appropriate for distribution through Project Handclasp included:

1. Material to supplement basic necessities; e.g., food, clothing, treadle sewing machines and accessories, medical equipment and supplies, hygienic items, hand tools, and light building material.
2. Educational material; e.g., textbooks, library books, magazines, school supplies, learning aids, and audiovisual items.
3. Recreational material for children; e.g., toys, athletic equipment, and playground equipment.
4. Overseas port visit mementos: e.g., souvenirs and mementos of shipboard visits.

In 2017, a Naval Audit Service report identified numerous fiscal and ethical issues in the operation of the program. Much of the support provided to the Project Handclasp Foundation, Inc. was beyond the legal authorities permitting DOD and the Navy to provide humanitarian assistance. 10 U.S.C 401-409. As a result, the Navy instruction authorizing the program, OPNAVINST 5726.3e was completely revised. The Navy ceased storing foundation property at government expense. Shortly thereafter, the Foundation ceased operations and the program essentially ended. In 2022, the Handclasp OPNAVINST was formally cancelled.

== Project Handclasp Foundation ==
Project Handclasp Foundation, Inc., San Diego, California, supported Project Handclasp by taking legal title to all donations intended for distribution to needy people by Project Handclasp. However, the donations were received by and stored by the US Navy, which had physical custody of the property. Donations collected by Project Handclasp were considered not to become the property of the U.S. Navy but are transported and distributed to needy people per the instruction. However, there was no legal authority for the navy to provide long-term storage of a private foundation’s property at government expense. When the Navy ended thus practice, the Foundation chose not to privately store the donations and it ceased operations. It has been inactive since 2017, when Chief of Naval Operations (CNO) issued new policy guidance requiring the Foundation to operate without direct Navy support and personnel. The 2017 revision to OPNAVINST 5726.3E addressed “organizational and administrative shifts and fiscal and ethics regulations issues identified during a legal review of the program”.

In 2022, the program was cancelled in its entirety.

== See also ==
- Soft power
