= Linda Ellen Watt =

American ambassador

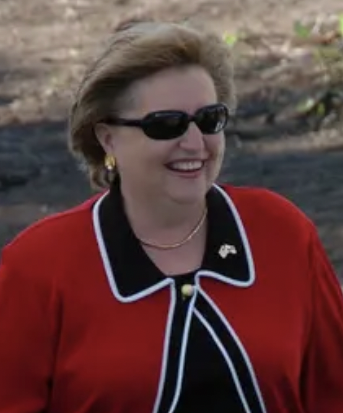
Watt in 2005

Linda Ellen Watt (born 1951, Tokyo) was the chief operating officer of the Episcopal Church (officially known as executive director of the Domestic and Foreign Missionary Society (DFMS)) and former U.S. ambassador to Panama (2002-2005). From 1997 to 1999, Watt was acting U.S. ambassador to the Dominican Republic.

Watt graduated from Vanderbilt University in 1973 with a BA, studying Spanish and history.

Watt retired as COO in 2011.
