= William J. Jorden =

American journalist (1923–2009)

William Jorden with his first wife, Eleanor, and their son, W. Temple, in Berlin in 1956 as he was leaving for Moscow

William John Jorden (May 3, 1923 – February 20, 2009) was a diplomatic correspondent for The New York Times, United States Ambassador to Panama, and author.

Jorden studied at Yale University, receiving a bachelor's degree in international relations in 1947. His university studies were punctuated by service in the Army during World War II, during which he learned Japanese at Yale and the University of Michigan. He received a master's degree in journalism from Columbia University in 1948.

On completion of his studies, he worked for the New York Herald Tribune, the Associated Press and, from 1952, The New York Times. He covered the Far East for the early part of his journalism career, including assignments in Japan and Korea. Later, he was Moscow bureau chief for The Times. His marriage to linguist Eleanor Harz ended in divorce.

In October 1957 he wrote multiple articles for the New York Times about Sputnik.

He was a member of the team that won the Pulitzer Prize for International Reporting in 1958.

In 1961, two years after returning to Washington, he left The Times to join the State Department. By the mid-1960s, he was involved in the State Department's Vietnam policy.

After a series of diplomatic and national security positions (as well as taking time from government to assist president Lyndon B. Johnson with his memoirs), he was appointed by president Richard M Nixon to the position of ambassador to Panama in 1974, where he played an instrumental role in negotiating the Torrijos-Carter Treaties that returned ownership of the Panama Canal to Panama. As outgoing ambassador in 1978, he was sent to garner regional support for mediation regarding the Nicaraguan political crisis of the Somoza regime, successfully convincing Somoza to accept mediation.

After government service, Jorden served as scholar in residence at the Lyndon B. Johnson Library. In 1984, he published "Panama Odyssey", a comprehensive study of the Panama Canal Treaty negotiations, to wide critical acclaim. He was consulted as an expert commentator by several news organizations prior to and following the United States invasion of Panama.

Jorden died at age 85 in 2009 of lung cancer in New Bedford, Massachusetts, just two days following the death of his ex-wife, Eleanor Harz.

Diplomatic posts
Preceded by Robert M. Sayre	United States Ambassador to Panama; 1974–1978	Succeeded by Ambler Hodges Moss, Jr.
