= List of ministers of transport and public works (Uruguay) =

The minister of transport and public works (Spanish: Ministro de Transporte y Obras Públicas) is the head of the Ministry of Transport and Public Works and a member of the Cabinet of Uruguay. The current minister is Luis Alberto Héber of the National Party (PN) who has been in office since 1 March 2020.

== List of ministers of transport and public works ==
Ministers of Promotion
Minister	Period
Juan Alberto Capurro	1891–1893
Juan José Castro	1894–1897
Jacobo A. Varela	1897–1899
Carlos Maria De Pena	1899
Gregorio L. Rodríguez	1899–1901
José Serrato	1903–1904
Juan Alberto Capurro	1903–1906

Ministers of Public Works
Minister	Period
Juan Lamolle	1907–1911
Víctor Sudriers	1911–1912
Santiago Rivas	1915–1919
Juan Andrés Álvarez Cortés	1925–1927
Federico E. Capurro	1932–1933
César Mayo Gutiérrez	1946–1948
Manuel Rodríguez Correa	1947–1949
José Acquistapace	1949
Manuel Rodríguez Correa	1951–1952
José Acquistapace	1953
Heraclio Ruggia	1967
Walter Pintos Risso	1967–1972
Walter Pintos Risso	1972
Ángel Servetti	1972–1973
Eduardo Crispo Ayala	1973–1974

Ministers of Transport and Public Works
Minister	Period
Eduardo Crispo Ayala	1974–1976
Eduardo Sampson	1976–1982
Francisco Tourreilles	1982–1985
Jorge Sanguinetti	1985–1989
Alejandro Atchugarry	1989–1990
Lucio Cáceres	1995–2000
Lucio Cáceres	2000–2004
Gabriel Gurméndez	2004
Gabriel Pais	2004–2005
Carlos Pollio	2005
Víctor Rossi	2005–2010
Enrique Pintado	2010-2015
Víctor Rossi	2015–2020
Luis Alberto Héber	2020–2021
José Luis Falero	2021–incumbent
