= United States–Uruguay relations =

- United States: Uruguay

Diplomatic mission
- Embassy of the United States, Montevideo: Embassy of Uruguay, Washington, D.C.

Relations between the United States and the Uruguay traditionally have been positive, based on a common outlook and emphasis on democratic ideals.

== History ==
Relations between the two countries began in 1836, when the United States recognized the formation of the Oriental State of Uruguay by granting an exequatur to John Darby as Consul General of Uruguay in New York City. In 1867 the two countries formally established diplomatic relations, and Alexander Asboth presented his credentials to the Uruguayan government as Minister Resident, while residing in Buenos Aires. An American Legation in Montevideo was opened on July 6, 1870, under Minister Resident John L. Stevens. In 1941 the legation was elevated to embassy status, and William Dawson was appointed the first Ambassador Extraordinary and Plenipotentiary, presenting his credentials on July 12, 1941.

In historical perspective, starting in the 1890s Uruguay took the lead in reaching out to the U.S. in order to counter the heavy British business presence. The U.S. responded in friendly fashion. Knarr argues:

The United States did not need to coerce Uruguay economically, politically, or militarily to achieve its goals; Uruguay was a friendly and stable nation that the United States could use as an economic and political gateway into the Southern Cone.

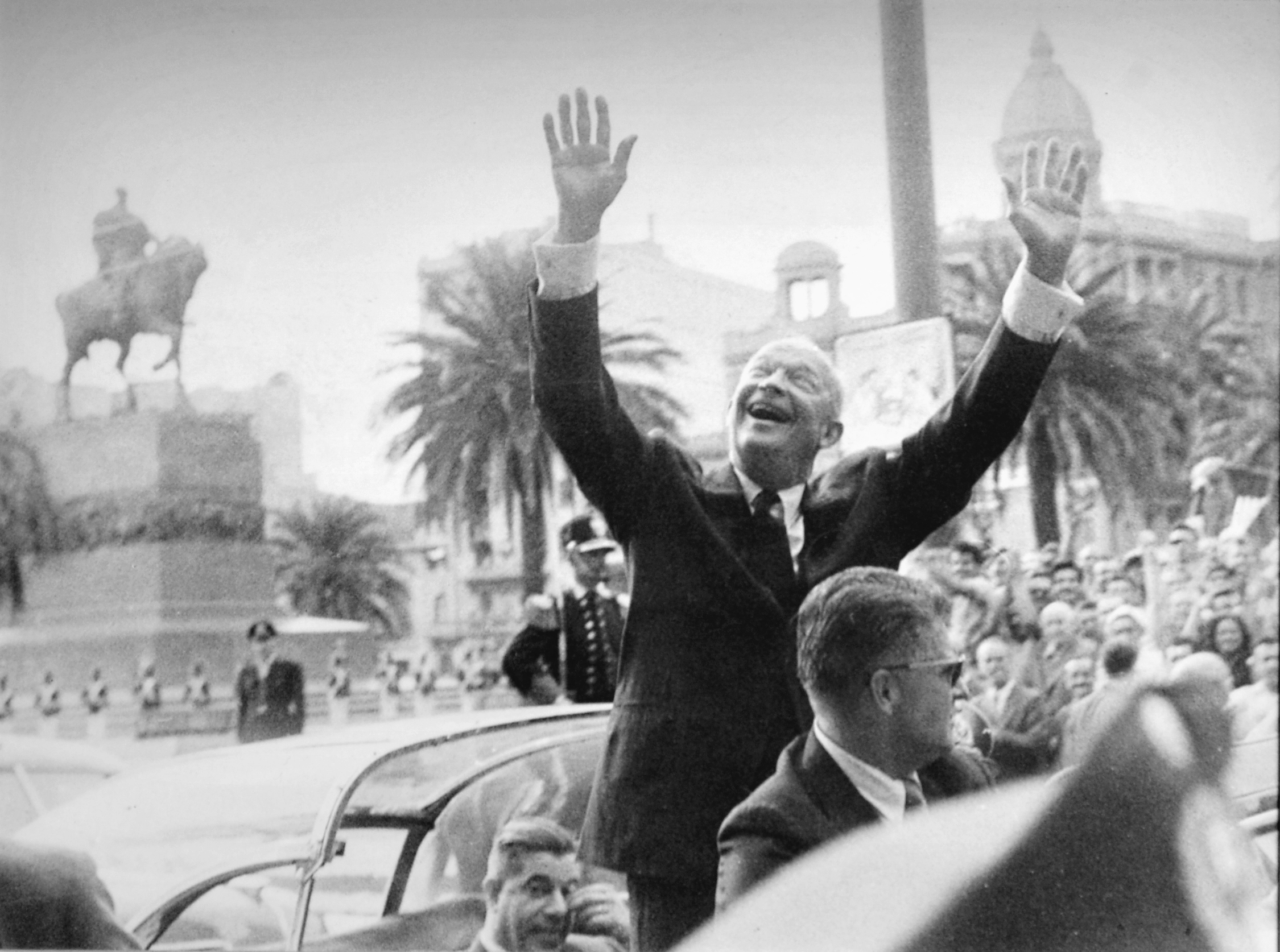
President Dwight D. Eisenhower at Plaza Independencia during his official visit to Uruguay, 1960.

In 1928, U.S. President-elect Herbert Hoover paid an official visit to Uruguay, where he met with President Juan Campisteguy and the National Council of Administration. In 1936, President Franklin D. Roosevelt also visited the country, holding an official meeting with Uruguayan President Gabriel Terra.

During the late 1930s, Uruguay occupied a relatively modest place in United States foreign policy, but this changed abruptly after the 1939 Battle of the River Plate, when the damaged German cruiser Admiral Graf Spee sought refuge in Montevideo, drawing international attention to Uruguay's neutrality during World War II and to its foreign ministry. In the following years, concerns about Axis activities in the Southern Cone created conditions conducive to U.S. hemispheric defense initiatives. Against this backdrop, the Roosevelt administration opened discussions with Uruguayan authorities in 1940 on the possible establishment of air and naval bases in Uruguay aimed at strengthening the defense of the country and the Río de la Plata region. Despite an initial openness to broader conversations on continental security, the proposal generated significant domestic debate and was ultimately rejected by the Uruguayan Parliament.

In December 1955, Luis Batlle Berres became the first Uruguayan president to make an official visit to the United States, where he met with President Dwight D. Eisenhower at the White House.

.In 2002, The United States and Uruguay created a Joint Commission on Trade and Investment (JCTI) to exchange ideas on a variety of economic topics. In March 2003, the JCTI identified six areas of concentration until the eventual signing of the Free Trade Area of the Americas (FTAA): customs issues, intellectual property protection, investment, labor, environment, and trade in goods. In late 2004, the United States and Uruguay signed an Open Skies Agreement, which was ratified in May 2006. In November 2005, they signed a Bilateral Investment Treaty (BIT), which entered into force on November 1, 2006. A Trade and Investment Framework Agreement (TIFA) was signed in January 2007. More than 80 U.S.-owned companies operate in Uruguay, and many more market U.S. goods and services.

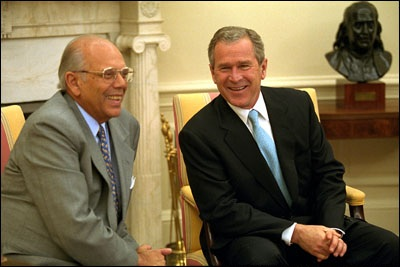
Presidents Jorge Batlle and George W. Bush at the Oval Office, White House, 2001.

Uruguay cooperates with the U.S. on law enforcement matters such as regional efforts to fight drug trafficking and terrorism. It has also been very active in human rights issues.

From 1999 through early 2003, Uruguayan citizens were exempted from visas when entering the United States under the Visa Waiver Program. This exemption was withdrawn on April 16, 2003, based on the high overstay rates for Uruguayans and worldwide national security concerns.

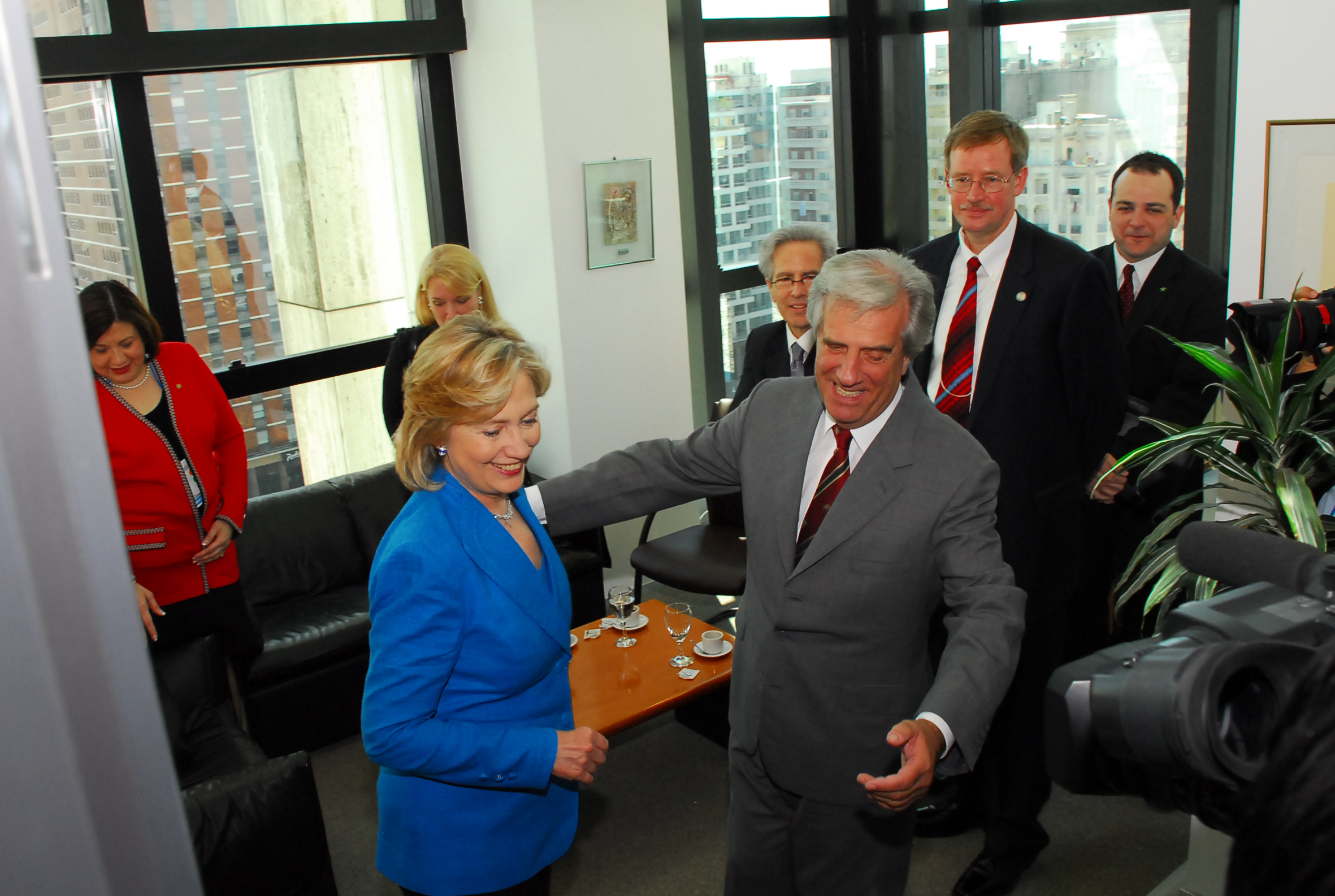
U.S. Secretary of State Hillary Clinton with Uruguayan President Tabaré Vázquez at the Executive Tower in Montevideo, 2010.

Under Tabaré Vázquez, President of Uruguay from 2005 to 2010 and 2015 to 2020, Uruguay has taken positions on a number of issues which are very markedly different from those of the United States. However, under his right-wing successor, president Luis Lacalle Pou, since 2020, United States-Uruguay relations have again improved and strengthened. Nevertheless, Vázquez sought the help of President George W Bush in the face of the crisis with Argentina around the Uruguay River pulp mill dispute.

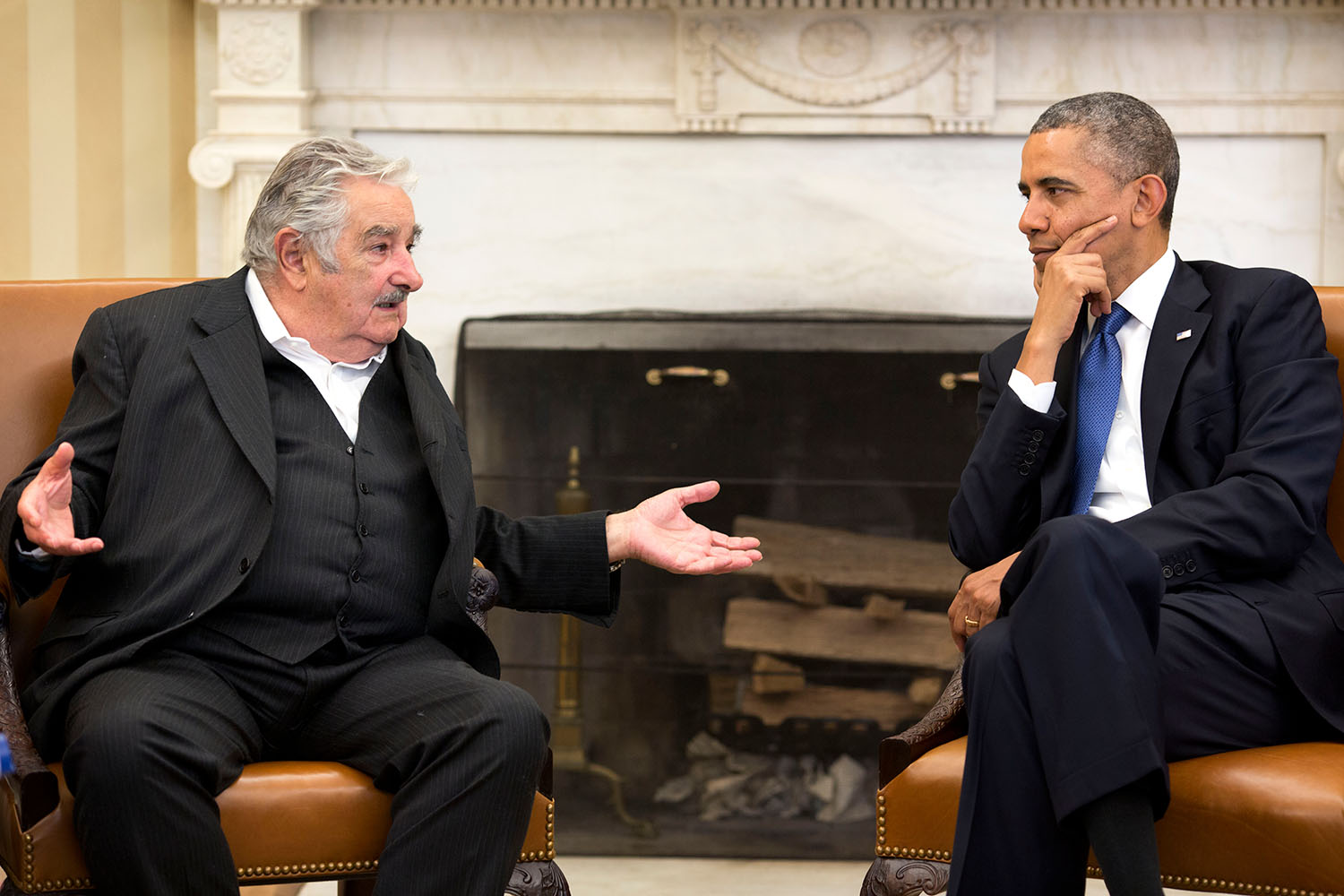
Presidents José Mujica and Barack Obama at the Oval Office, White House, 2014.

According to the 2012 U.S. Global Leadership Report, 40% of Uruguayans approve of U.S. leadership, with 22% disapproving and 38% uncertain.

== Principal U.S. Embassy officials ==
- Ambassador - Lou Rinaldi

== Principal Uruguayan Embassy officials ==
- Ambassador--Andrés Durán Hareau

== Resident diplomatic missions ==
- United States has an embassy in Montevideo.
- Uruguay has an embassy in Washington, D.C., and has consulates-general in Chicago, Miami, New York City and San Francisco.
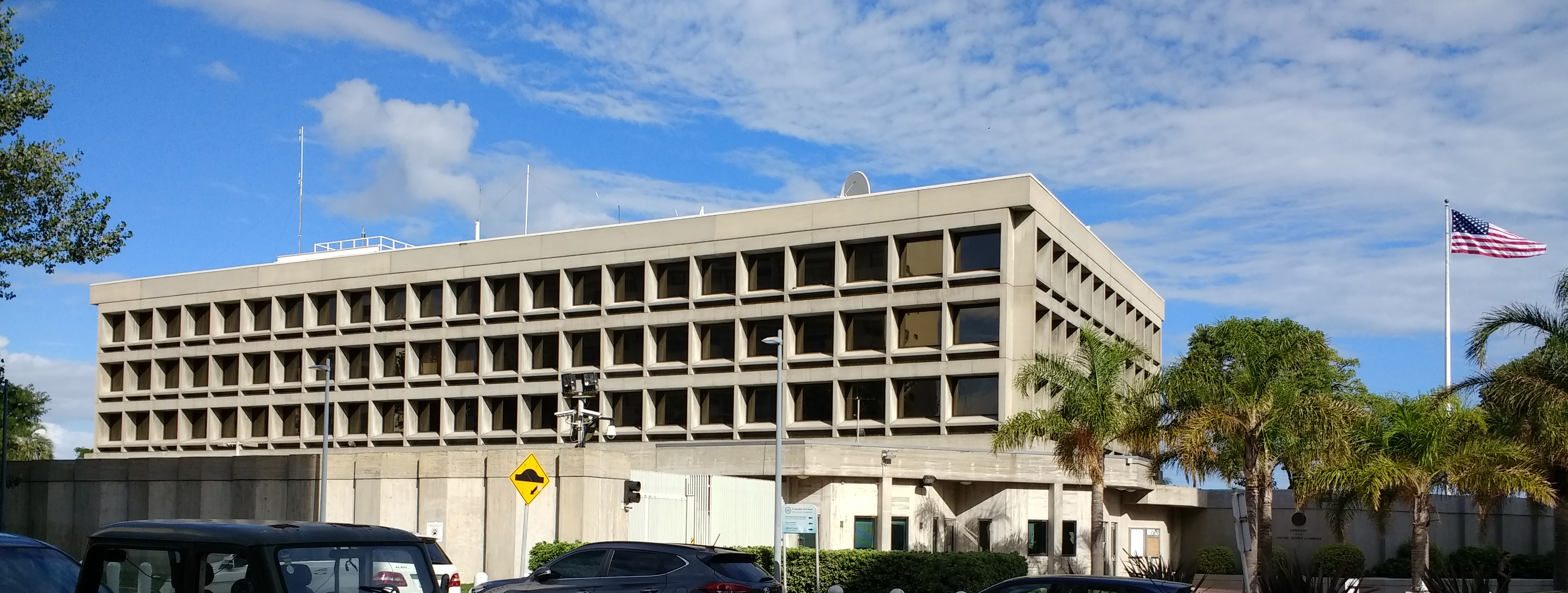
Embassy of the United States in Montevideo

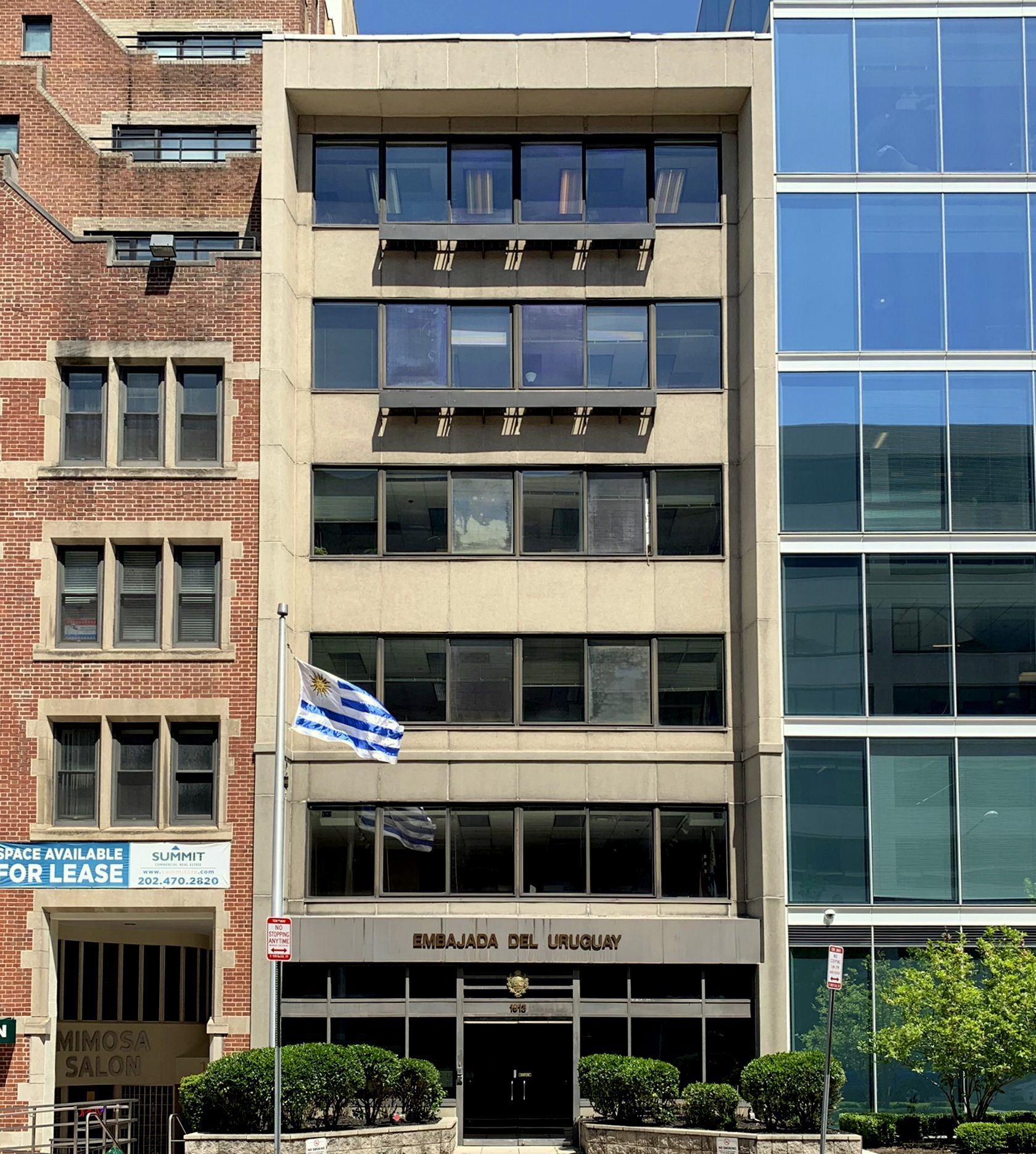
Embassy of Uruguay in Washington, D.C.

== See also ==
- Foreign relations of the United States
- Foreign relations of Uruguay
- Americans in Uruguay
- Uruguayan Americans
- United States involvement in regime change in Latin America
