= Luis Falero =

Luis Falero may refer to:

- Luis Ricardo Falero (1851–1896), Spanish painter
- José Luis Falero (born 1966), Uruguayan business and politician
