= David D. Nelson =

American diplomat

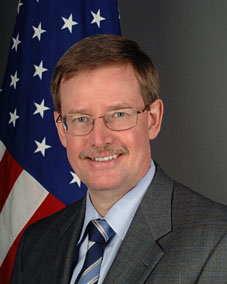
David D. Nelson

David Daniel Nelson (born 1956) is a United States Foreign Service Officer and a career member of the Senior Foreign Service. He has notably served as the United States Ambassador to Uruguay.

== Biography ==
David D. Nelson was born in Minnesota. He received a B.A. the University of Wisconsin and a master's degree in Economics from the University of Maryland.

From 1982 to 1984, he served as a diplomat in Montevideo, Uruguay. He also served in Berlin, Madrid, Bonn, Quito, and the U.S. Consulate in Mérida, Yucatán. He has worked for the National Security Council as Senior Coordinator for the Sea Island G-8 Summit. He has served as Under Secretary for Economic, Energy and Agricultural Affairs, as Director of the Office of Terrorism Finance and Economic Sanctions, Director of the Iraq Reconstruction Task Force, and as Director of the Office of Monetary Affairs. Prior to becoming ambassador, he served as Acting Assistant Secretary of the Bureau of Economic, Energy and Business Affairs.

He speaks Spanish and German.

=== United States Ambassador to Uruguay ===
He served as the United States Ambassador to Uruguay under Barack Obama 2009–2011.

Diplomatic posts
Preceded by Frank E. Baxter	United States Ambassador to Uruguay; 2009 to May 2011	Succeeded by Julissa Reynoso
