= Americans in Uruguay =

Ethnic group in Uruguay

Americans in Uruguay Estadounidenses en Uruguay
Total population
- 2,800 (2011 Uruguayan census)

Regions with significant populations
- Montevideo

Languages
- American English and Rioplatense Spanish

Related ethnic groups
- Uruguayan Americans, American diaspora

Americans in Uruguay are mostly persons born in the United States and living in Uruguay. There are as well some Uruguayan-born persons of American descent.

== History ==
What is now known as Uruguay has maintained intense relations with the United States since colonial times. In 1811, a Spanish translation of Thomas Paine's most important works circulated in Montevideo, including the Declaration of Independence, the Articles of Confederation, the U.S. Constitution, and the constitutions of five U.S. states, and this was inspirational to Uruguayan national hero José Gervasio Artigas, who embraced Paine's ideas. Many of Artigas's writings drew directly from Paine's, including the Instructions of 1813, which Uruguayans consider to be one of their country's most important constitutional documents.

Americans in Uruguay, although usually only a few as compared with the more numerous local Britons, made significant contributions to the country, notably the naval commander Jonas Coe, who took part in the combats which ultimately led to independence.

American presence on Uruguayan soil increased with the establishment of diplomatic relationships in the late 19th century.

In 1970, American agent Dan Mitrione was assassinated in Uruguay.

== Present ==
The 2011 Uruguayan census revealed 2,800 people who declared the United States as their country of birth; as of 2013, there were more than 300 American citizens registered in the Uruguayan social security.

There is also another migration-related issue: during the 1960s, several Uruguayans migrated to the United States and had their children on North American soil. Lately, there are many of those people returning to Uruguay, so there are American-born children and young people who are now living in Uruguay.

Among schoolchildren born abroad, Americans are the fifth-biggest group, among 62 countries that are represented in Uruguayan schools.

An educational institution, the Uruguayan American School (established 1960) serves both Uruguayan and American children.

The Church of Jesus Christ of Latter-day Saints in Uruguay has been present since 1947, with many American missionaries active in Uruguay.

== Education ==
The Uruguayan American School serves American families in the Montevideo area.

== Notable people ==
- Jonas Halstead Coe (1805-1864), naval commander
- Fay Crocker (Montevideo, 1914-1983), golfer
- Frederick Crocker (1821-1911), American naval commander and US consul
- James Louis Barker (1880–1958), historian and missionary, organizer of the first LDS Church in Uruguay in 1944
- Jayson Granger (born 1989 in Montevideo), professional basketball player

== See also ==
- Immigration to Uruguay
- Uruguayan Americans
- United States–Uruguay relations
