= Martin J. Silverstein =

American lawyer

United States Ambassador to Uruguay
- In office October 2001 – 2005
- President: George W. Bush
- Preceded by: Christopher Ashby
- Succeeded by: Frank E. Baxter

Personal details
- Born: 1954 (age 71–72) New York City, New York, U.S.
- Children: 6
- Education: Rutgers University (BA); Temple University (JD); University of Pennsylvania (LLM)
- Occupation: attorney; diplomat
- Awards: Superior Honor Award; Medal of the Oriental Republic of Uruguay (Gran Oficial)

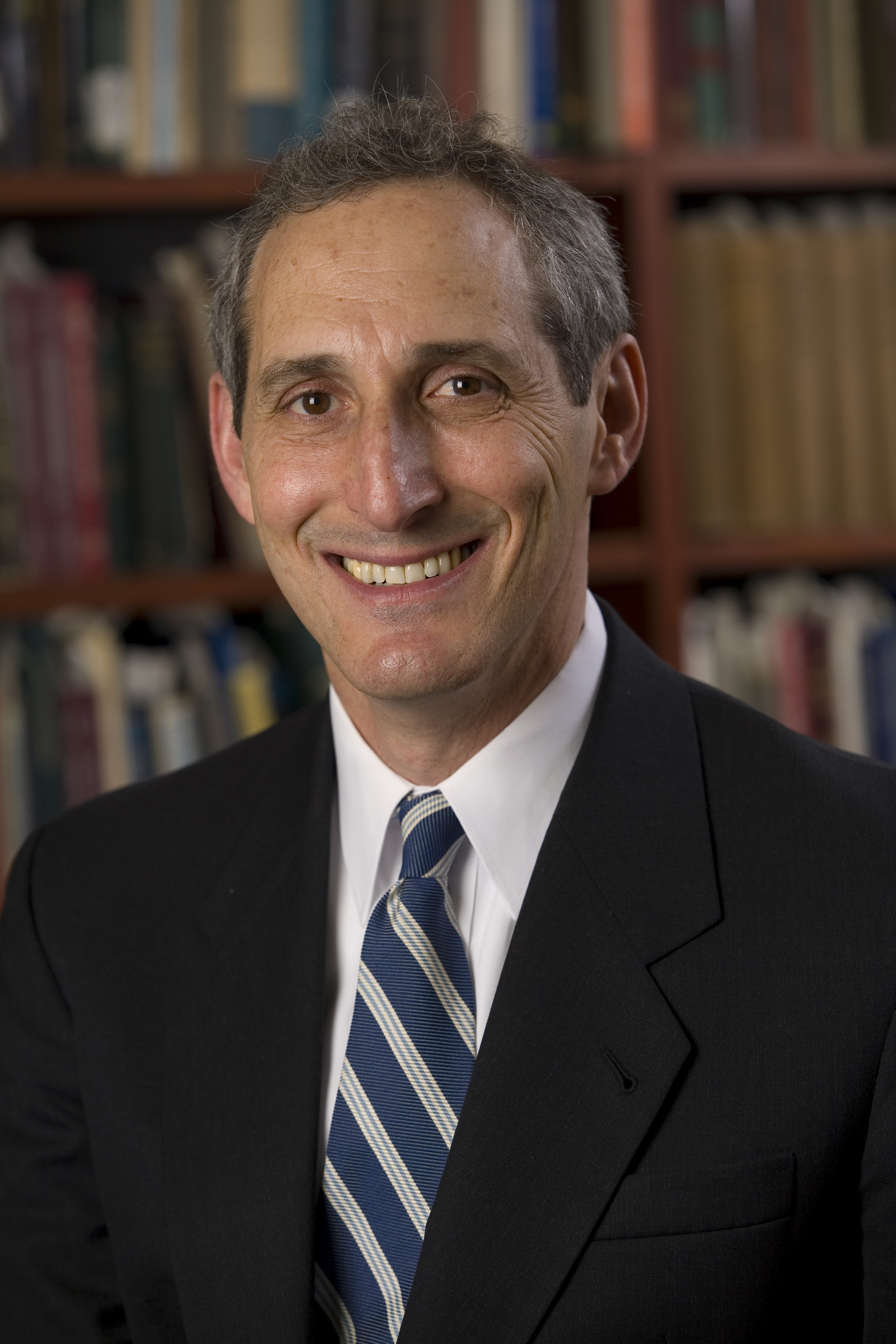
Martin J. Silverstein, Ambassador of the United States of America, ret.

Martin J. Silverstein (born 1954) is an American attorney and diplomat. He served as the United States Ambassador to Uruguay under President George W. Bush from 2001 to 2005.

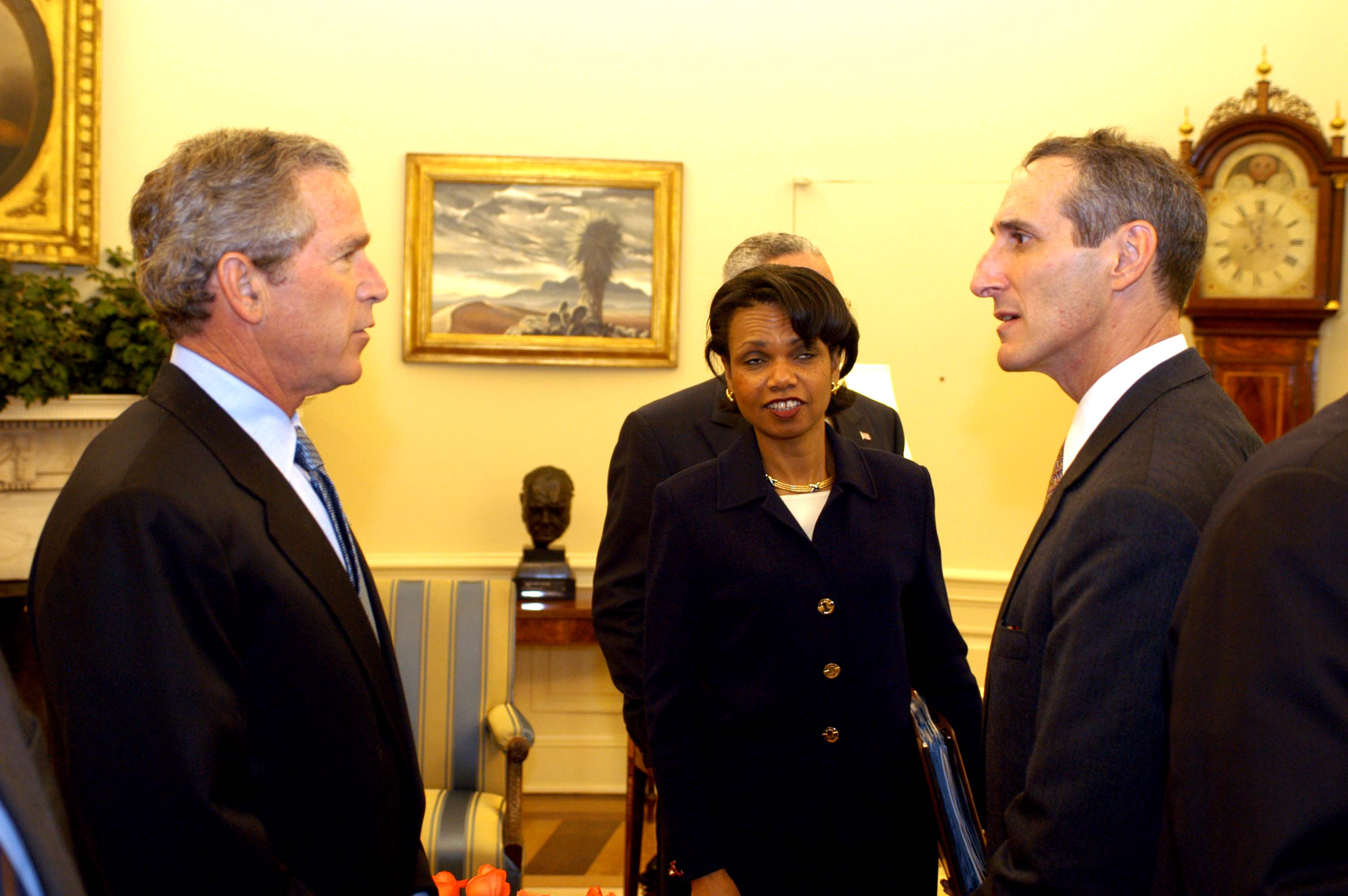
White House Oval Office meeting- President George W. Bush, NSA Advisor Condoleezza Rice, Ambassador Martin J. Silverstein

== Biography ==
Martin J. Silverstein served as a senior member of the first presidential transition of Donald Trump. He has practiced law for nearly four decades beginning his legal career in Philadelphia. Since leaving his post as United States Ambassador to Uruguay in 2005, he has been working as an attorney in New York, Texas and Washington, D.C. as senior counsel with an international law firm, practicing Global and Corporate & Securities law. President George W. Bush nominated Silverstein as Ambassador Extraordinary and Plenipotentiary to the Oriental Republic of Uruguay just prior to the attacks of September 11, 2001. A Trustee of the University of Pennsylvania, Silverstein also sits as a Judge Pro Tempore in the First Judicial District of Pennsylvania.

=== Diplomatic career ===
While serving as United States Ambassador to Uruguay from 2001 to 2005, he fostered positive bilateral relations allowing Uruguayan President Batlle to "use his good relation with U.S. President George W. Bush to help obtain $1.5 billion in credit to stave off default," pending receipt of an IMF loan. He also engineered the reopening of U.S. markets to banned Uruguayan commodities and fostered the signing of an Open Skies Agreement and the first Bilateral Investment Treaty of the Bush Administration.

Silverstein served as a Delegation Member to the MERCOSUR 4 plus 1 Council on Trade and Investment negotiations, a Delegation Member of the U.S.-Uruguay Joint Commission on Trade and Investment, and a member of the U.S. Presidential Delegation to the Uruguayan presidential inauguration.

Silverstein joined the President of the United States in Jerusalem, Israel as a member of the United States Honorary Delegation celebrating the founding of the State of Israel and participated as a delegate on the Ukraine Presidential Election IRI Observation Mission.

=== Education and legal career ===
Silverstein was born in New York City in 1954 and grew up in Elizabeth, New Jersey and Lower Merion Township, Pennsylvania. He received a B.A. in political science from Rutgers University-New Brunswick in 1976, a J.D. from Temple University Beasley School of Law (senior member of Law Review) in 1979, and an LL.M. from the University of Pennsylvania Law School in 2008 .

He is a member of the bars of New Jersey, New York, Pennsylvania, Texas, U.S. Court of International Trade, U.S. Tax Court and the Third Circuit Court of Appeals. He is also a member of the Texas Bar College, a recognition society of the best trained attorneys in Texas.

Silverstein is the current appointee of United States Senator Pat Toomey to the Federal Judicial Nomination Advisory Panel (E.D. Pa.). He previously served United States Senators Rick Santorum and Arlen Specter in the same role on the then titled ‘Federal Judicial Nominating Commission’.

Reflecting the confidential opinion of members of the Bar and Judiciary, Silverstein maintains the highest possible AV Preeminent rating for legal skills, integrity and professional excellence under the Martindale-Hubbell Peer Review Rating System and Client Review Rating System.Martindale.com

=== Awards and recognition ===
The United States government and Secretary of State Colin Powell decorated Ambassador Silverstein with the Superior Honor Award Medal, an uncommon recognition for a non-career ambassador. The U.S. government also awarded Silverstein the Foreign Affairs Award for Public Service, presented by Secretary of State Condoleezza Rice, for "performance with exceptional dedication and distinction."

The President and Legislature of Uruguay decorated Silverstein with the Medal of the Oriental Republic of Uruguay, rank of Gran Oficial. Silverstein remains the only American citizen in history to receive Uruguay's highest honor.

Silverstein was awarded the Citizens Commendation for Bravery by the Philadelphia Police Commissioner for his courageous assistance to the Philadelphia Police Department in the apprehension and detention of two criminals.

He has received the Legion of Honor from the Chapel of Four Chaplains, the Certificate of Merit for Service to Veterans from the United States Congress and twice received the Maimonides Award from Magen David Adom.

In 2016, the chief justice of the Supreme Court of Texas and the president of the Texas State Bar recognized Silverstein for his outstanding delivery of legal services to low-income Texans and admitted him to the Pro Bono College of the State Bar of Texas.

=== Presidential transition ===
Silverstein served as a senior member of the Transition Team for President Donald Trump. Within President-elect Appointments he played a crucial role in the final screening and vetting of candidates as Chair of the ‘Tiger Team’ interview and evaluation process of the top-ranking officials for nearly every federal department, agency and service branch, personally interviewing nearly 250 candidates. Silverstein is known to have a close relationship with the Trump and Kushner families having attended the 2009 wedding reception of Ivanka (née Trump) and Jared Kushner.

=== Other activities ===
Silverstein's bipartisan appeal resulted in successive Governors of two different political parties (Tom Corbett-R and Tom Wolf-D) commissioning him to serve sequential terms as a Trustee of the (Pennsylvania) Public School Employees' Retirement System (PSERS). Twice confirmed by the Pennsylvania State Senate, he is currently in his second full term at PSERS where he chairs the Elections Committee and serves on the Investment Committee and Corporate Governance Committee. The fifteen Trustees are an independent administrative board of the Commonwealth with exclusive investment power and management control of the $54 billion public pension fund.

At the University of Pennsylvania, in addition to being a University Trustee, Silverstein also serves on the board of overseers at the School of Nursing Science, the Board of Governors of the University Club at Penn and as a Penn Alumni Interviewer. He also sits on the Board of Visitors at Temple University Beasley School of Law. In Uruguay, Silverstein served as chairman emeritus of the Fulbright Scholar Program.

Silverstein volunteered as an AmeriCorps VISTA Volunteer with the Corporation for National & Community Service serving Habitat for Humanity in North Philadelphia.

He served as a (Class II, weapons certified) Reserve Police Officer in Elizabeth, New Jersey for 12 years and also served as a Constable and Special Deputy Sheriff.

He is a member of the Council of American Ambassadors and a long-time supporter of the Northwest Women's Shelter in Washington, D.C.

=== Personal ===
He speaks Spanish and Hebrew. He is married and has six children.

Diplomatic posts
Preceded by Christopher C. Ashby	United States Ambassador to Uruguay; 2001-2005	Succeeded by Frank E. Baxter
