= Mario Héber Usher =

Uruguayan politician

Mario Héber Usher (1921 – 19 May 1980) was a Uruguayan political figure.

== Background ==
Mario Héber was a prominent member of the Uruguayan National (Blanco) Party. His parents were Blanca Usher Conde and Alberto Héber Uriarte (grand-nephew of Juan D. Jackson). He was from a well-known political family; his brother Alberto Héber was President of Uruguay from 1966 to 1967; his son Luis Alberto Héber is a National Party Senator and former Deputy.

== Elected offices ==
In 1958 he was elected a Deputy. Usher was President of the Chamber of Deputies of Uruguay from March 1, 1966, to March 1, 1967. In 1971 he was elected a Senator.

== Family incident ==
In 1978 his wife, Cecilia Fontana, was assassinated by poison intended for himself, sent by an unknown person or group. Other politically prominent families were also - unsuccessfully - targeted. This tragic incident has been widely blamed on political violence associated with the period of civilian-military rule in Uruguay, which began in 1973, after which Mario Héber and many other politicians were proscribed from political activities, but which he continued to pursue clandestinely.

=== Diplomatic repercussions ===
In 2008 US Ambassador to Uruguay Frank E. Baxter was involved in a series of controversial high level exchanges in respect of these yet unresolved issues.

== Death ==
He died in 1980.

== See also ==
- Politics of Uruguay
- List of political families#Uruguay
- Frank E. Baxter#Admits Mitrione case 'pushback' equivalence in response to Uruguayan assassination investigation
