= Julissa Reynoso Pantaleón =

American attorney and diplomat (born 1975)

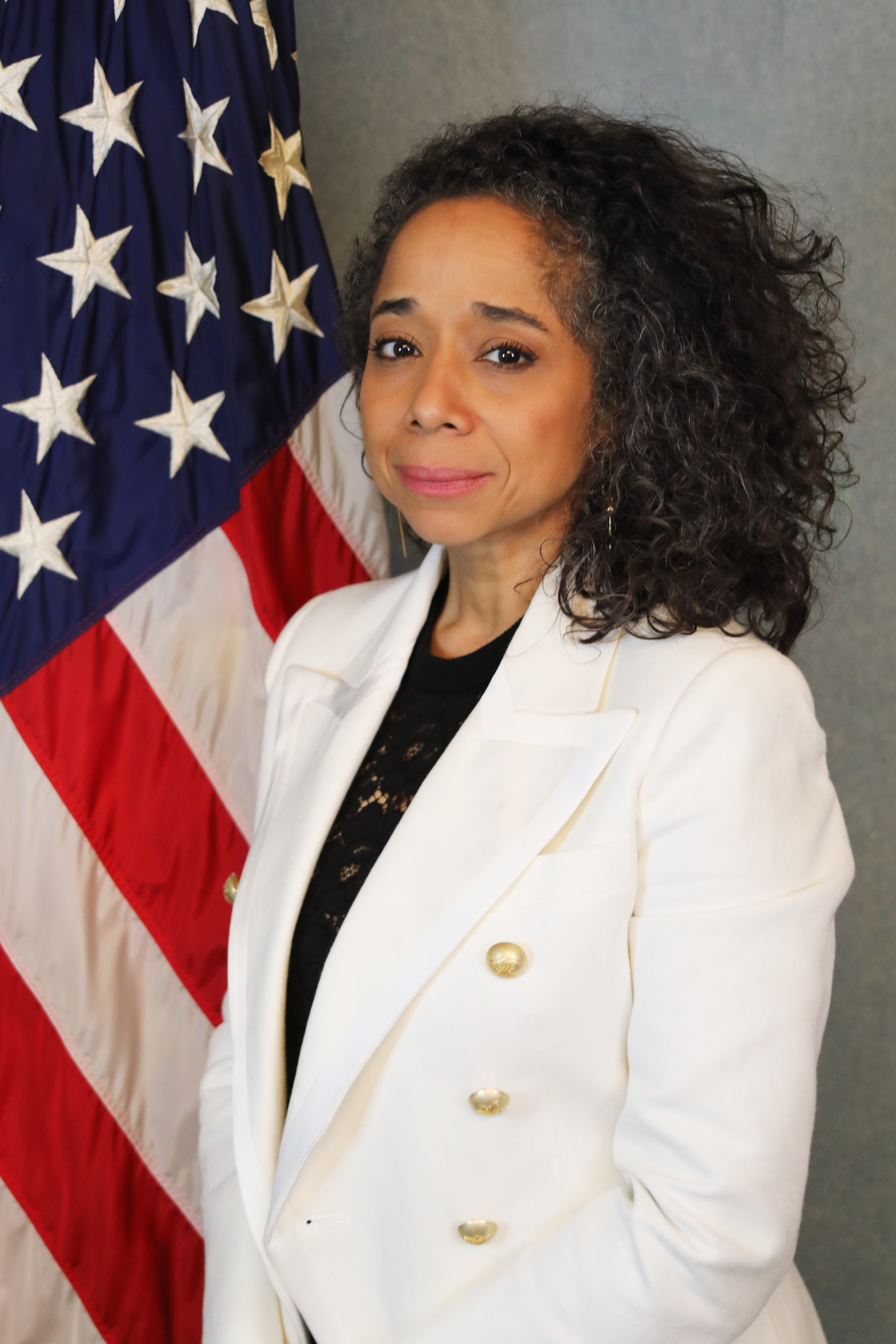
- Official portrait, 2023

68th United States Ambassador to Spain 6th United States Ambassador to Andorra
- In office February 2, 2022 – July 12, 2024
- President: Joe Biden
- Preceded by: Duke Buchan
- Succeeded by: Benjamin Leon

Chief of Staff to the First Lady of the United States
- In office January 20, 2021 – January 7, 2022
- President: Joe Biden
- First Lady: Jill Biden
- Preceded by: Stephanie Grisham
- Succeeded by: Anthony Bernal

United States Ambassador to Uruguay
- In office May 9, 2012 – December 10, 2014
- President: Barack Obama
- Preceded by: David D. Nelson
- Succeeded by: Kelly Keiderling

Personal details
- Born: January 2, 1975 (age 51) Salcedo, Dominican Republic
- Party: Democratic
- Education: Harvard University (BA); Emmanuel College, Cambridge (MPhil); Columbia University (JD)

Julissa Reynoso Pantaleón (born January 2, 1975) is a Dominican Republic-born American attorney and diplomat who served as the United States Ambassador to Spain and Andorra from 2022 to 2024. Prior to her service as ambassador she was the chief of staff to First Lady Jill Biden. She is currently a partner at the global law firm Hogan Lovells Cadwalader. She formerly served as a litigation and international arbitration partner with the international law firm Winston & Strawn LLP. She was previously a partner with Chadbourne & Parke LLP, practicing in the firm's International Arbitration and Latin America groups.

Reynoso is affiliated with the faculty at Columbia University School of Law and the School of International and Public Affairs. From March 2012 until December 2014, she served as United States Ambassador to Uruguay. She is a former deputy assistant secretary for the Bureau of Western Hemisphere Affairs at the United States Department of State. President Biden nominated her to be the next United States Ambassador to Spain on July 27, 2021, being confirmed on December 18, 2021.

== Early life and education ==
A native of the Dominican Republic, Reynoso immigrated to the United States in 1982. She graduated valedictorian of her class at Aquinas High School in the Bronx. She was admitted to Harvard University, where she helped found several student groups and was active with the Institute of Politics at the John F. Kennedy School of Government.

After earning an A.B. in government from Harvard University in 1997, Reynoso was named the John Harvard Scholar and earned a Master of Philosophy in development studies in 1998 from Emmanuel College, Cambridge. Reynoso also earned a Juris Doctor from Columbia Law School in 2001. At Columbia, she was the editor for the Columbia Journal of Transnational Law. Her graduate studies were supported by The Paul & Daisy Soros Fellowships for New Americans. After law school, she clerked for Judge Laura Taylor Swain.

== Career ==
In 2008, Reynoso was active in the Hillary Clinton 2008 presidential campaign before joining the Barack Obama 2008 presidential campaign. Prior to joining the Obama administration, Reynoso was an attorney in private practice at the international law firm of Simpson Thacher & Bartlett LLP in New York. Reynoso resided in the Washington Heights neighborhood in Manhattan and served on the boards of several non-profit groups. She also served as a legal fellow at Columbia Law School and the Institute for Policy Integrity at New York University School of Law.

In 2006, Reynoso served as deputy director of the Office of Accountability in the New York City Department of Education. Reynoso has published widely in both Spanish and English on a range of issues, including regulatory reform, community organizing, housing reform, immigration policy and Latin American politics for both the popular press and academic journals.

Reynoso is a member of the Council of Foreign Relations and a World Economic Forum Young Global Leader. Reynoso is the recipient of various public interest awards, including recognitions from Columbia University, New York University, the NorthStar Foundation, the Legal Aid Society, and the Hispanic National Bar Foundation. She serves on the boards of several nonprofit and advocacy organizations. She is also a member of a Washington, D.C.–based Western Hemisphere think tank, the Inter-American Dialogue.

=== Obama administration ===
==== Department of State ====
In 2009, Reynoso joined former secretary of state Hillary Clinton to serve as Deputy Assistant Secretary in the Bureau of Western Hemisphere Affairs. During her tenure, Reynoso was charged with developing and implementing a comprehensive security and rule of Law strategy for Central America and the Caribbean.

==== Ambassador to Uruguay ====
In October 2011, President Barack Obama expressed his intention to nominate Reynoso as United States Ambassador to Uruguay. On March 30, 2012, the U.S. Senate confirmed Reynoso as United States ambassador to Uruguay. As an ambassador, Reynoso focused on trade and commerce, with particular interest in agricultural trade, and on science, technology and education cooperation.

===== Tenure =====
In 2014, during her time as Ambassador to Uruguay, Reynoso was allegedly denied entry into a restaurant in Montevideo because of racial discrimination, though they initially claimed it was due to lack of reservation and dress code despite others entering without a reservation. Uruguayan media called it a "diplomatic mess" and the restaurant apologized, claiming the host incorrectly discerned who could enter. Reynoso escalated this incident with the State Department.

=== Biden administration ===
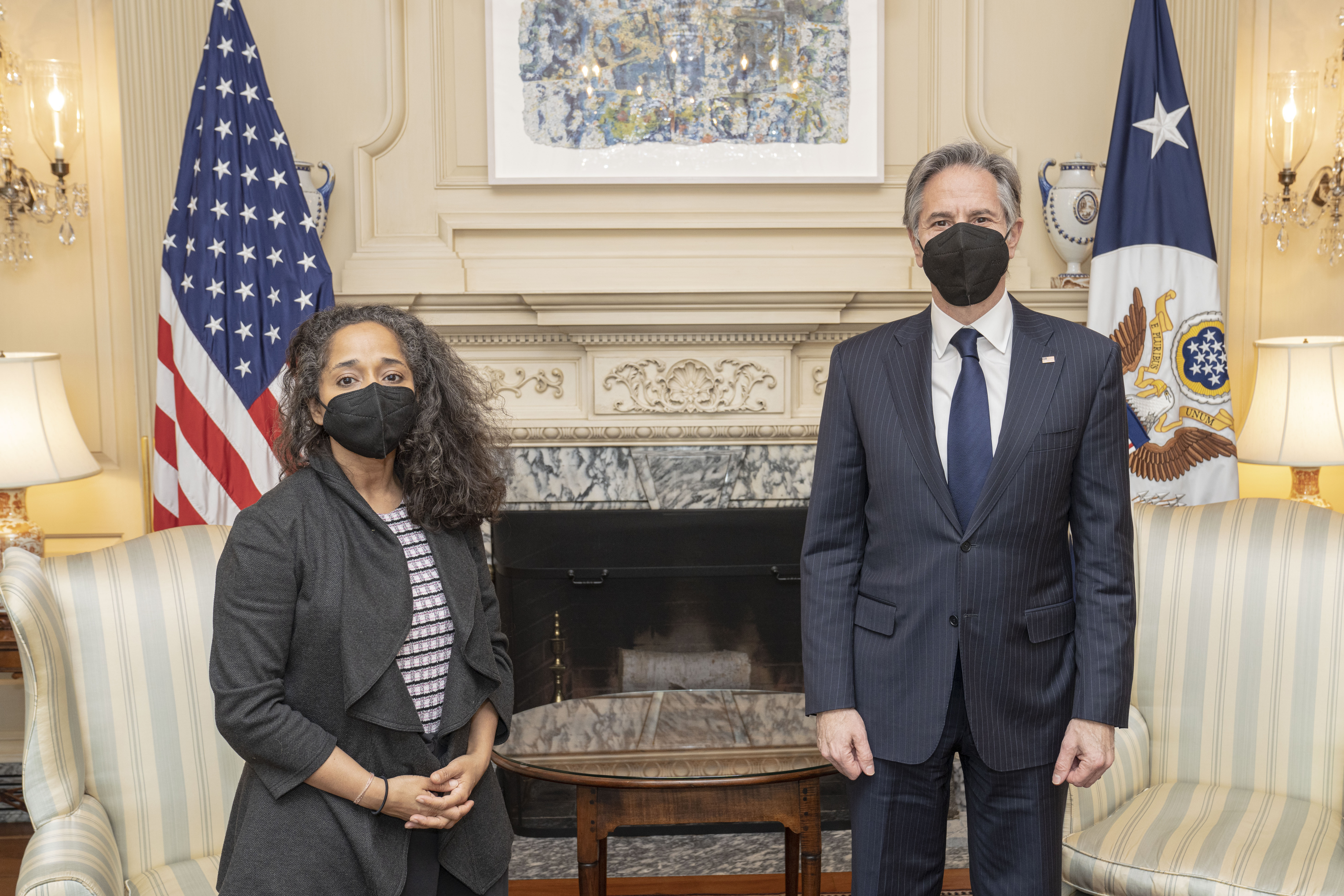
Ambassador Reynoso with Secretary of State Antony Blinken in 2022

==== Chief of Staff to the First Lady ====
In November 2020, Reynoso was named chief of staff to the then-incoming First Lady of the United States, Jill Biden.

==== Ambassador to Spain ====
On July 27, 2021, President Joe Biden announced the nomination of Reynoso to be the United States ambassador to Spain and Andorra. Her nomination was sent to the Senate the following day. Hearings on her nomination were held before the Senate's Foreign Relations Committee on October 5, 2021. Her nomination was reported favorably by the committee on November 3, 2021. On December 18, 2021, her nomination was confirmed in the Senate by voice vote. Reynoso arrived in Spain on January 17, 2022. On February 2, 2022, she presented her credentials to King Felipe VI.

Reynoso described Spain–United States relations as "more intense than ever before" during her tenure as ambassador, with tensions peaking in 2023 after two of her staffers were expelled from Spain for bribing National Intelligence Centre agents. She managed sharp foreign policy differences between the US and Spain on the Gaza War, with the USA providing weapons and support to Israel while Spain joined the South Africa's genocide case against Israel and formally recognized Palestine's statehood. In support of Israel, Reynoso unsuccessfully pushed for Spain to join a US military operation against a Yemeni blockade on shipments to Israel via the Red Sea. Prior to these crises, Reynoso had overseen significant expansion of geopolitical and military ties between the US and Spain, including a massive increase in the number of destroyers kept at the US naval base in Rota, increased US involvement in preventing migration across the Mediterranean Sea, and cooperation on the Ukraine War. Reynoso resigned as ambassador in July 2024 and rejoined her previous law firm Winston & Strawn.

=== Post-political career ===
Reynoso co-wrote the play Public Charge with Michael J. Chepiga, which is inspired by her career in the State Department from 2009 to 2011 and her tenure as Ambassador to Uruguay from 2012-2014, as well as her involvement in negotiating the release of Alan Gross. The play premiered at The Public Theater in New York City in 2026, with previews beginning March 12 before an opening night on March 25.

In November 2026, the Spanish government granted her Spanish citizenship.

== Recognition ==
Reynoso was recognized in Crain's New York's 2017 "List of Leading Women Lawyers in NYC". She and her colleague Nicole Silver were recognized in Latinvex's 2017 ranking of "Latin America's Top 100 Female Lawyers." In 2017, Winston & Strawn was ranked as an international firm for its Latin America practice, of which Reynoso is a member, in the international arbitration category. In 2023, an honoree by the Carnegie Corporation of New York's Great Immigrant Award.

Diplomatic posts
Preceded by David D. Nelson	United States Ambassador to Uruguay; 2012–2014	Succeeded by Kelly Keiderling
Preceded by Duke Buchan	United States Ambassador to Spain and Andorra; 2022–2024	Vacant
Political offices
Preceded by Stephanie Grisham	Chief of Staff to the First Lady; 2021–2022	Vacant
