= Uruguayan American School =

Private American international school in Uruguay

Location
- Av. Dra. María Luisa Saldún de Rodríguez 2375; Montevideo; Uruguay; 34.8739368°S 56.0775876°W

Information
- Type: American private international school
- Founded: 1958
- Enrollment: 350
- International students: 75%
- Average class size: 14
- Colors: Red; Light Blue; White; Yellow; Dark Blue
- Mascot: Toros
- Website: uas.edu.uy

Uruguayan American School (UAS) is an American private international school in Carrasco, Montevideo. It serves nursery through grade 12. As of 2024 it has approximately 350 students, including students from Uruguay and 32 other nationalities. Students at the Uruguayan American School have the opportunity to earn the US high school diploma, the IB Diploma, and, in many cases, the Uruguayan Diploma. The school's educational program is designed to prepare students for academic and professional pursuits in various global contexts.

The Uruguayan American School conducts all classes in English, with the exception of the optional Uruguayan Program class and Spanish language classes. The school employs teachers from the United States and various other countries, many of whom are native English speakers. Other faculty members are bilingual in English and Spanish, contributing to an environment where students are engaged in English language use.

Students at the Uruguayan American School come from over 32 countries, including a distribution of 25% from Uruguay, 25% from the United States, and 50% from various countries worldwide.

A variety of extracurricular activities and sports programs are available to students across all grade levels. These include chess, karate, Model United Nations, artistic gymnastics, and robotics, among others. Secondary students may participate in school sports teams, such as swimming, volleyball, basketball, or soccer. The school is a member of the South American Activities Conference, participating in competitions with other international schools in South America.

== History ==
The Uruguayan American School (UAS) was established on April 14, 1958, by a group of Uruguayan and American citizens in Montevideo, with the aim of providing a U.S.-style education and promoting intercultural understanding between Uruguay and the United States. The school began with an emphasis on offering academic programs accredited in both countries, initially catering mostly to American citizens in Uruguay.

The school quickly outgrew its original facilities, necessitating a move to a new building on Bulevar Artigas by 1960 to accommodate its expanding student body and academic offerings. UAS was accredited by the Southern Association of Colleges and Schools (SACS) in 1969, further solidifying its educational credentials. By 1978, UAS had purchased a new site in the Carrasco neighborhood, signaling another phase of growth and expansion, including the addition of new facilities and programs to meet the needs of its diverse student population.

Significant milestones in the school's development include the purchase and construction of its current campus in Carrasco in 2002, with the school moving to this location in 2003. This modern campus supported further growth and the introduction of new academic programs, including the International Baccalaureate Diploma Programme approved in 2013. In 2015, UAS transitioned its accreditation to the New England Association of Schools and Colleges (NEASC), and in 2016, it inaugurated a new secondary wing, adding significant space and resources to support its educational mission.

== Education ==
The education program at the Uruguayan American School incorporates several key elements aimed at delivering a comprehensive learning experience:

Faculty Composition: The school's faculty includes educators with experience from international schools around the world, contributing to the institution's diverse educational perspectives and expertise.

Student-to-Faculty Ratio: With a 6:1 student-to-faculty ratio, the school offers personalized attention to its students. This is further enhanced by specialized teachers in fields such as music, arts, sports, drama, and robotics.

Class Size: The average class size at the school is 14 students, facilitating an environment where students can receive focused instruction and engage more directly with both teachers and classmates.

Educational Resources: The school sources textbooks and other educational materials internationally to ensure that students have access to current and comprehensive resources. Technology updates are regularly made to keep pace with new developments in educational tools.

Academic Calendar: The academic year follows the northern hemisphere schedule, starting in August and ending in June, with two major breaks marking the end of each semester.

UAS students all earn the US Diploma, the majority also earn the IB Diploma, and approximately half of all graduates also earn the optional Uruguayan Diploma.

=== Elementary School Program ===
The Early Childhood Center at the Uruguayan American School serves Nursery, Pre-Kindergarten, and Kindergarten students, aiming to foster a range of developmental skills through play-based learning and thematic units. This approach integrates sensory experiences to support motor, social, emotional, and cognitive development. The curriculum includes language arts, English language development, mathematical thinking, social studies, scientific thinking, and classes in Spanish, music, drama, physical education, and social-emotional learning.

For grades 1-5, the Elementary School at UAS follows a curriculum aligned with US educational standards, covering English Language Arts, Math, Social Studies, Science, Spanish, Music, Drama, Art, Physical Education, Computer Science, and Social-Emotional learning. The program is designed to address the developmental stages of students, incorporating experiential learning methods to enhance socio-emotional, physical, and cognitive growth within a structured learning environment.

=== Secondary School Program ===
The Secondary School at the Uruguayan American School, covering grades 6-12, is structured to provide a continuum of education from Middle School through High School. In Middle School (grades 6-8), the focus is on developing critical thinking and foundational academic skills within the framework of the US Core Curriculum. High School students (grades 9-12) engage in increasingly complex coursework, aimed at enhancing their analytical and critical thinking skills, culminating in the International Baccalaureate Diploma Program for 11th and 12th graders.

This phase of education at UAS is designed to integrate academic rigor with the cultivation of interdisciplinary skills, promoting independent thought and engagement with global issues. The program aims to prepare students for higher education and future careers by fostering academic and technological proficiency, global awareness, creativity, and emotional intelligence.

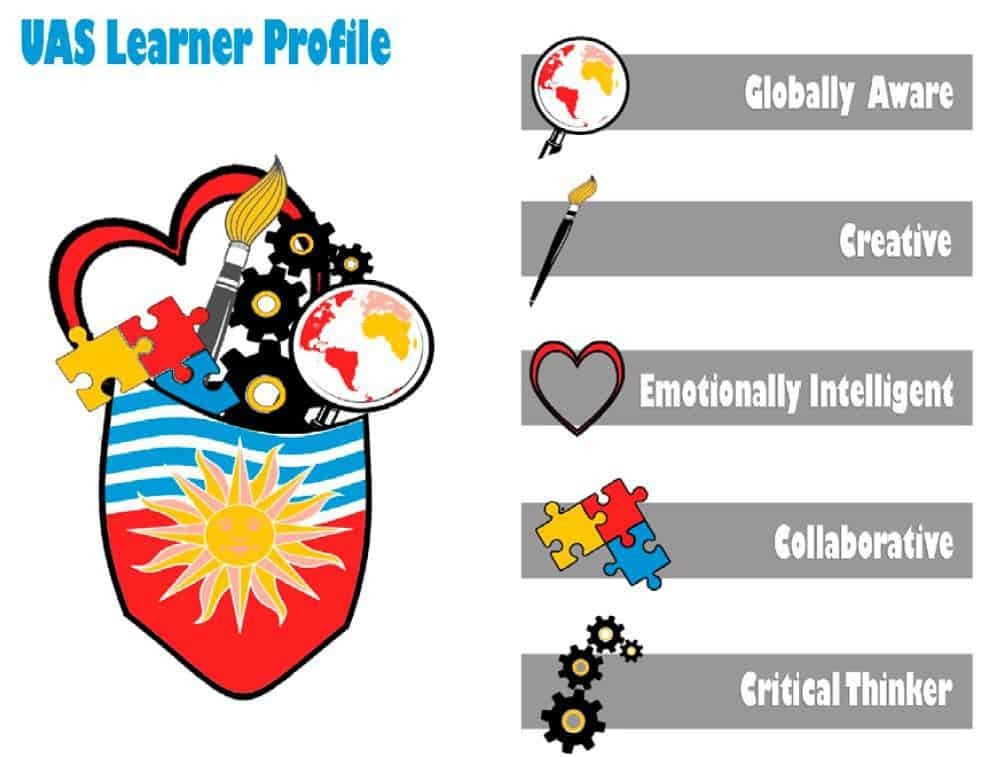
The Uruguayan American School learner profiles

=== College Planning ===
The Uruguayan American School offers a College Counseling Program designed to assist students in grades 9-12 with the university exploration and application process. This program focuses on helping students understand their strengths, interests, and aspirations. Counselors work individually with students to research potential colleges and universities that align with their academic and personal goals, including guidance on merit and need-based scholarship opportunities. The program aims to support students through the application process to institutions worldwide and to advise them on making informed decisions regarding their university choices.

Graduates of the Uruguayan American School are known to secure admission to a diverse array of universities globally. These include institutions in the United States, Canada, the United Kingdom, and various countries in South America, reflecting the broad and international focus of the school's educational programs.

== South American Activities Conference ==
The South American Activities Conference (SAAC) is a "sports and arts conference composed of international schools from Argentina, Brazil, Chile, Ecuador, Peru and Uruguay". UAS regularly participates in these SAAC Events:

- SAAC Soccer
- SAAC Basketball
- SAAC Swimming
- SAAC Volleyball
- SAAC STEAM (Science Technology Engineering Art Mathematics)
- SAAC Fine Arts (Music, Visual Arts, Theatre, and Media)

== Building ==
The campus of the Uruguayan American School is located on three hectares in Carrasco, a suburb of Montevideo, featuring 7,100 square meters of built space dedicated to educational facilities for Nursery through Secondary School levels. The campus includes distinct sections for elementary and secondary education, a comprehensive library, computer labs, a Design Lab, science laboratories equipped with modern amenities, two gymnasiums, a fitness center, outdoor sports fields, an auditorium, and a cafeteria. Additional facilities encompass a regulation soccer field, a hard court, and three playground areas, with the Early Childhood playground having direct classroom access and separate fencing for safety. Classrooms at the school are designed to be spacious and air-conditioned, benefiting from natural light and equipped with interactive whiteboards. The science labs are modern and connected by shared storage and prep areas, featuring necessary scientific equipment and dual-use spaces for lectures and lab work. Added in 2016, the Secondary School has two flexible learning spaces of 250 square meters each, designed for a variety of educational configurations and equipped with technology access points. The Media Center caters to all grades, offering a wide range of resources including books in English and Spanish, magazines, CDs, and DVDs, along with comfortable reading spaces. The auditorium, capable of accommodating up to 300 individuals, is equipped for performances and events with a stage, lighting, and sound systems. Technology resources include a Computer Lab with up-to-date software, multiple laptop and iPad carts, and facilities for physical education, including newly inaugurated gymnasiums and a fitness area.

== See also ==
- Americans in Uruguay
- International Schools
