= Kelly Keiderling =

American diplomat (born 1966)

Kelly Ann Keiderling-Franz
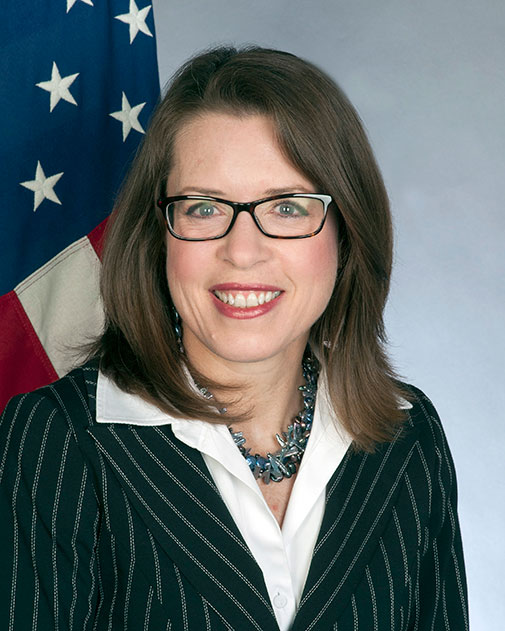

United States Ambassador to Uruguay
- In office June 23, 2016 – June 29, 2019
- President: Barack Obama; Donald Trump
- Preceded by: Julissa Reynoso
- Succeeded by: Kenneth S. George

Personal details
- Born: 1966 (age 59–60) Dominican Republic
- Education: Georgetown University; National Defense University

Kelly Ann Keiderling-Franz (born 1966) is an American diplomat who served as the United States ambassador to Uruguay from 2016 to 2019 and has served as head of the OSCE Mission to Moldova since 2022.

== Early life and education ==
Keiderling was born in the Dominican Republic. Keiderling's father was in the U.S. Foreign Service and had met her Bolivian mother on his first international assignment in Cochabamba, Bolivia. Keiderling grew up primarily in Latin America and Portugal.

Keiderling earned a bachelor's degree from Georgetown University and later a master's degree from the National War College.

== Career ==
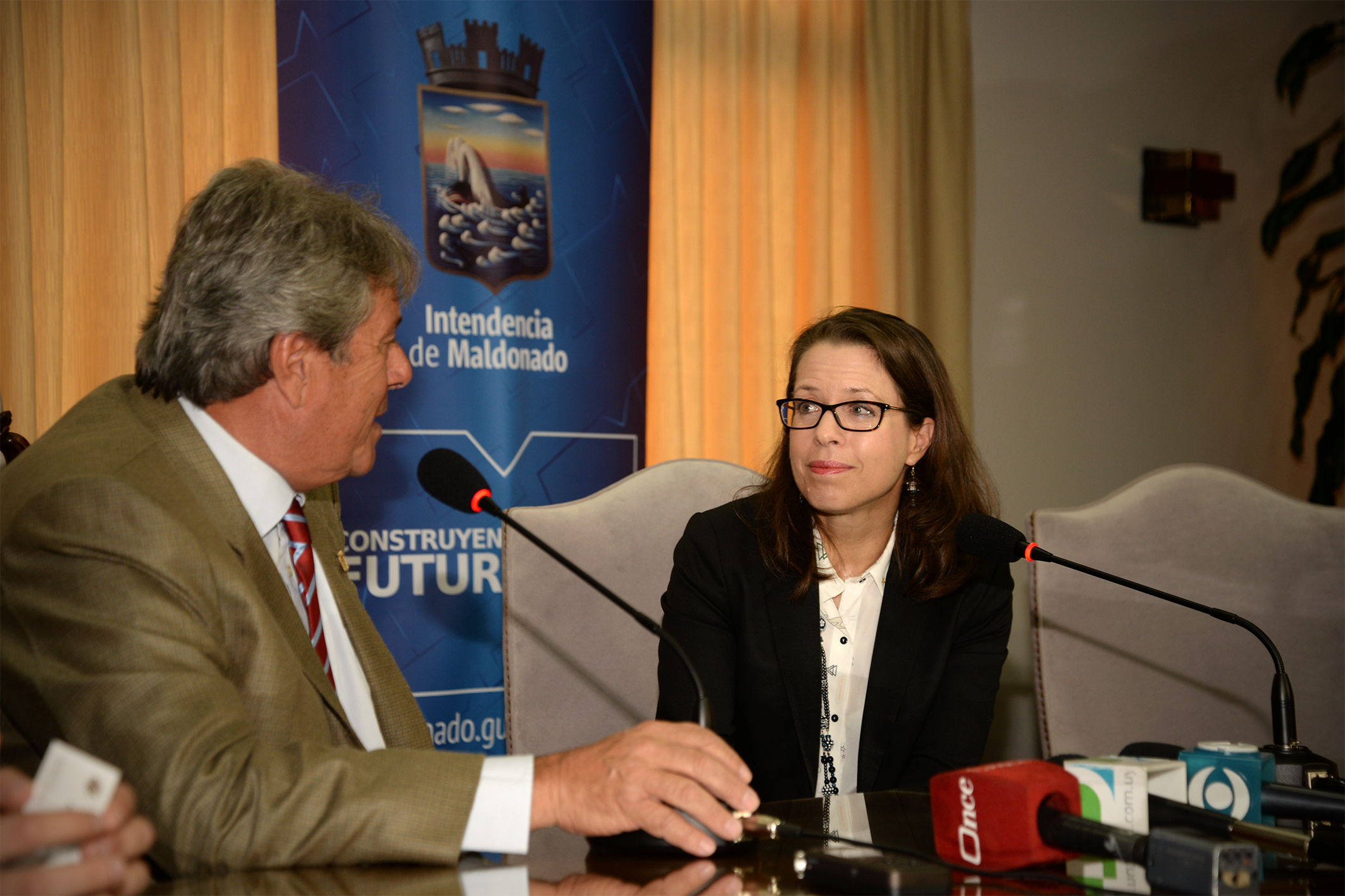
Keiderling with the Intendant of Maldonado Enrique Antía on her visit to that Uruguayan city in 2017.

Keiderling joined the Foreign Service in 1988. Her U.S. assignments included ones as senior Panama desk officer, public diplomacy desk officer for the Caribbean, acting deputy director for Central American Affairs, strategic language issues coordinator in the Bureau of Human Resources, chief of staff in the Iraq Office, and principal deputy assistant secretary for the Bureau of Educational and Cultural Affairs. Her foreign assignments have included serving as deputy chief of mission in Chișinău, Moldova. She has served as public affairs officer in Cuba, Botswana and Kyrgyzstan. Her other international assignments include ones in the Dominican Republic, Ethiopia, and Zambia. In 2013, Venezuelan president Nicolás Maduro expelled Keiderling and two other U.S. diplomats from the country.

She was tapped by President Obama to become United States Ambassador to Uruguay in 2016 and was confirmed by the Senate later that year, on May 17. She assumed her role on June 23, 2016. Her appointment as ambassador ended on June 29, 2019.

From 2019 to 2021, Keiderling served as Deputy Commandant and International Affairs Advisor at the US National War College. She assumed her role as Head of the OSCE Mission to Moldova in October 2022.

== Personal life ==
Keiderling is married to David Franz, also a foreign service officer, and they have two children. In addition to English, she speaks Spanish, Portuguese, French and Russian, as well as some Italian and Romanian.

Diplomatic posts
Preceded by Julissa Reynoso	United States Ambassador to Uruguay; 2016–2019	Succeeded by Kenneth S. George
