= Dan Branch =

American politician

Dan H. Branch
- Branch in 2006

Member of the Texas House of Representatives from the 108th district
- In office January 8, 2003 – January 13, 2015
- Preceded by: Kenn George
- Succeeded by: Morgan Meyer

Personal details
- Born: March 5, 1958 (age 68) Montreal, Quebec, Canada
- Party: Republican
- Spouse: Stacey Salvino
- Children: 5
- Education: Douglas MacArthur High School (San Antonio); Oklahoma Christian University; Southern Methodist University Dedman School of Law; Georgetown University

Dan H. Branch (born March 5, 1958) is an American politician who served as a Republican member of the Texas House of Representatives from 2003 to 2015.

== Biography ==
=== Legislative tenure ===
Branch won the seat in 2002, when the incumbent Republican Kenn George stepped down after two terms to run unsuccessfully in the Republican primary for Texas land commissioner, losing to Jerry E. Patterson, then a state senator from Houston. The 2002 race was Branch's first for state office. He won every election thereafter until 2014, when he ran for attorney general.

Branch served as chairman of the House Committee on Higher Education from 2009 to 2014 and served on the Calendars, Elections and Redistricting Committees, as well as the House Select Committee on State Sovereignty. Branch also served on the Legislative Budget Board. Prior to the 81st Session, he served three terms as the Chair of Budget and Oversight on the House Public Education Committee and served as Vice Chair of the Appropriations Subcommittee on Education.

In 2009, Branch was selected by Texas House members from eleven north Texas counties to co-chair the Dallas Area Legislative Delegation (DALD), at the delegation's first meeting of the 81st session. Branch replaced retired member Fred Hill (R-Richardson) as the Republican co-chair. He was re-elected in 2011 to serve as co-chair.

During the 81st legislative session, Branch was the author of House Bill 51, also known as the "Tier One Universities" Bill. The bill announced that seven so-called emerging research universities would compete for extra funding in hopes of joining the University of Texas at Austin and Texas A&M University as nationally recognized research institutions. These seven schools include the University of North Texas, the University of Texas at Dallas, the University of Texas at Arlington, the University of Texas at El Paso, the University of Texas at San Antonio, the University of Houston and Texas Tech University. After signing HB 51 into law, Governor Rick Perry said: "House Bill 51 will go down in the history books as one that truly is improving education in our state."

=== Campaign for Texas Attorney General ===
On July 14, 2013, Texas Attorney General Greg Abbott announced his intention to run for Governor of Texas in the 2014 Texas gubernatorial election. On July 25, 2013, Dan Branch officially announced his candidacy in the 2014 election.

Shortly following the launch of his campaign, Branch received the endorsement of six of Attorney General Greg Abbott's top lieutenants, including former Solicitor General James C. Ho. Former Texas Supreme Court Chief Justice Thomas R. Phillips and former Texas Supreme Court Justices Craig T. Enoch, Harriet O'Neill and former United States Attorney General Alberto Gonzales endorsed Branch for attorney general.

A majority of the House Republican Caucus endorsed Branch in his bid for state Attorney General. Shortly after his announcement of candidacy for attorney general, Branch reported more than $4 million on hand, a considerably larger amount than that of his two opponents.

In the primary, Branch finished second place with 35%, compared to 45% for Ken Paxton. In the contentious runoff, Paxton defeated Branch by a 65% to 35% margin.

=== Community involvement ===
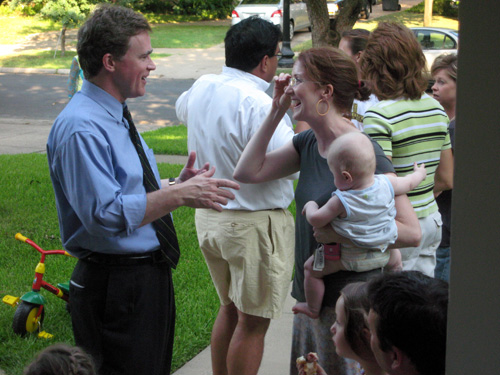
Branch visits with neighbors in the Munger Place Historic District of Old East Dallas.

In the fall of 2008, Branch joined Dallas Mayor Tom Leppert and Dallas Independent School District Superintendent Dr. Michael Hinojosa in leading "Operation Comeback", a statewide effort to stop 50,000 students a year from dropping out of high school.

He sits on the board of the John Goodwin Tower Center for Political Studies at SMU.

=== Family life ===
Branch and his wife, Stacey, have five children: Daniel, Spencer, Catherine, Charles, and Sarah. They have lived and worked in Dallas for almost three decades.

Texas House of Representatives
Preceded by Kenn George	Texas State Representative for District 108 (Dallas County); 2003–2015	Succeeded by Morgan Meyer
