= Luis Alberto Héber =

Uruguayan politician

Luis Alberto Heber
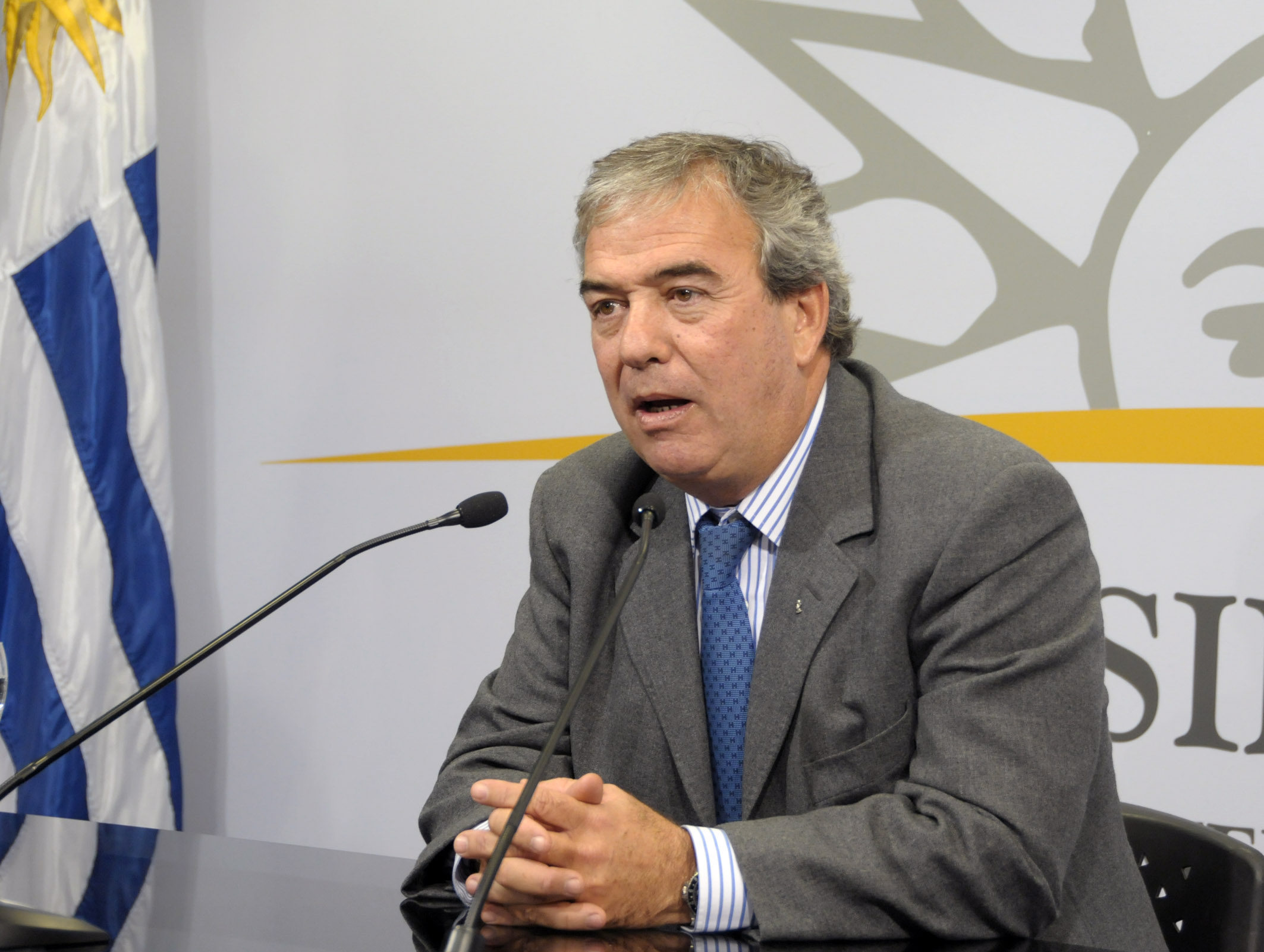

Minister of Interior
- In office 24 May 2021 – 6 November 2023
- President: Luis Alberto Lacalle Pou
- Preceded by: Jorge Larrañaga
- Succeeded by: Nicolás Martinelli

Minister of Transport and Public Works
- In office 1 March 2020 – 24 May 2021
- President: Luis Alberto Lacalle Pou
- Preceded by: Victor Rossi
- Succeeded by: José Luis Falero

President of the National Party
- In office 13 January 2011 – 16 April 2018
- Preceded by: Luis Alberto Lacalle
- Succeeded by: Beatriz Argimón

Senator of Uruguay
- In office 2 March 1995 – 15 February 2020

Representative of Uruguay for Rivera
- In office 14 February 1985 – 13 February 1995

Personal details
- Born: Luis Alberto Heber Fontana; 22 December 1957 (age 67); Montevideo, Uruguay
- Political party: National Party
- Spouse: Adriana Currás
- Children: Victoria Blanca; Emilia
- Parent(s): Mario Heber Usher; María Fontana Etchepare

Luis Alberto Heber Fontana (born 1957) is a Uruguayan political figure of the National Party who served as Minister of Interior between May 24, 2021 and November 2023. He previously served as Minister of Transport and Public Works (from March 1, 2020 to May 24, 2021), Senator (1995–2020) and as National Representative (1985–1995).

== Background ==
Luis Alberto Héber comes from a prominent Uruguayan National Party family; he himself has also for many years associated himself with this party's cause. His father Mario Héber Usher was a prominent Senator among his Party's leadership. His uncle Alberto Héber Usher was President of Uruguay 1966–1967. He was married to the late Beatrice Dominici, Italian, until her death. They have two daughters.

== Political career ==
In 1989 Heber was elected to serve as a National Representative, and served as President of the Chamber of Deputies of Uruguay from March 1, 1993 to March 1, 1994. In the 1994 election he was elected Senator, and in subsequent years was repeatedly re-elected.

Heber was appointed Minister of Transport and Public Works on December 16, 2019, days after the victory of Luis Lacalle Pou. He took office on March 1, in replacement of Víctor Rossi. However, after the sudden death of Interior Minister Jorge Larrañaga, on May 24, 2021, President Lacalle Pou carried out a cabinet reshuffle; Héber was appointed in replacement of Larrañaga as head of the Ministry of the Interior, and José Luis Falero held the ministerial portfolio of Transport and Public Works.

== Family incident and diplomatic repercussions ==
It has been notably alleged by Senator Luis Alberto Héber, who is a son of Cecilia Fontana de Héber, assassinated by person(s) unknown in 1978, that records may show that the US Embassy in Montevideo had knowledge of this tragic incident. According to Senator Héber, his mother was assassinated because of efforts of local secret intelligence circles to preserve in office President Aparicio Méndez, alleged again by Senator Héber to have been a CIA asset. Again according to Senator Héber, the US Embassy was playing a 'double game' in 1978, talking human rights but simultaneously working with Uruguayan secret intelligence figures in order to defend President Méndez's position.

In 2008 US Ambassador to Uruguay Frank E. Baxter was involved in controversial, high level exchanges regarding Uruguayan investigations into Senator Héber's mother's assassination and the allegations which arose from the tragic incident.

== See also ==
- Politics of Uruguay
- List of political families#Uruguay
- Frank E. Baxter#Admits Mitrione case 'pushback' equivalence in response to Uruguayan assassination investigation
