= Heide B. Fulton =

American diplomat

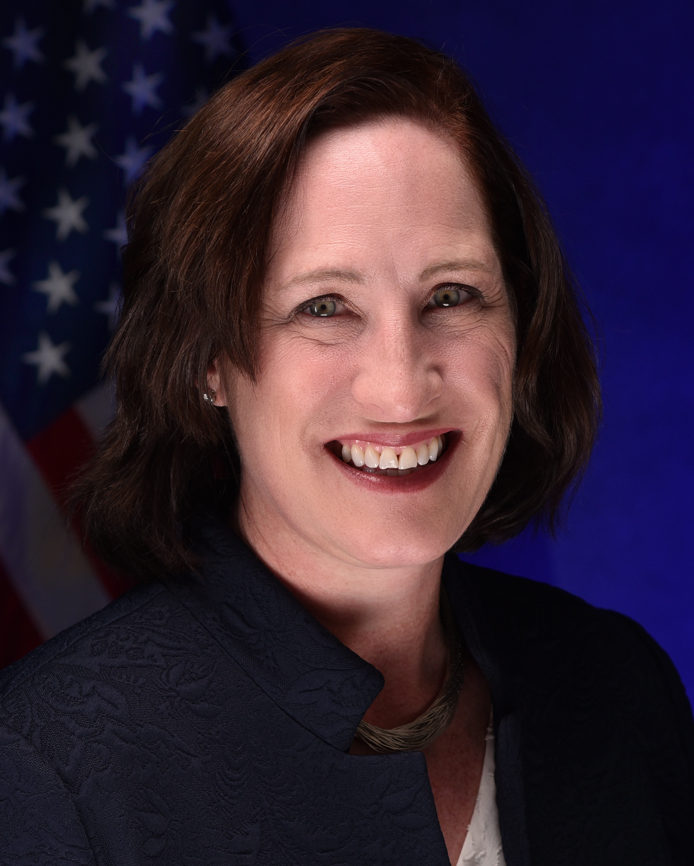

United States Ambassador to Uruguay
- In office March 22, 2023 – June 27, 2025
- President: Joe Biden; Donald Trump
- Preceded by: Kenn George
- Succeeded by: Lou Rinaldi

United States Chargé d’Affaires of Honduras
- In office June 11, 2017 – July 12, 2019
- President: Donald Trump
- Preceded by: James D. Nealon
- Succeeded by: Laura Farnsworth Dogu

Personal details
- Education: Boston College (BA); Troy State University (MA)

Heide Bronke Fulton is an American diplomat who served as the United States ambassador to Uruguay from March 22, 2023 to June 27, 2025. She previously served as the Chargé d'affaires ad interim to Honduras from June 11, 2017 to July 12, 2019.

== Early life and education ==
Fulton was born in Buffalo, New York. She received a Bachelor of Arts degree from Boston College and a Master of Arts in International Relations from Troy State University.

== Career ==
She is a career member of the Senior Foreign Service with the rank of Minister-Counselor. Her assignments in Washington, D.C., include serving as the director of the main press office, Pearson Fellow in the Office of Senator Robert Menendez, press advisor for the Bureau of Western Hemisphere Affairs, and special assistant to the under secretary for political affairs. She also served as director of the Office of Mexican Affairs. She has served as the deputy assistant secretary of state in the Bureau of International Narcotics and Law Enforcement Affairs since August 10, 2020.

In May 2019, the day after Fulton issued a statement urging Hondurans against acts of violence, demonstrators set a fire outside the entrance to the United States Embassy.

=== U.S. ambassador to Uruguay ===
On May 13, 2022, President Joe Biden announced his intent to nominate Fulton to be the next United States ambassador to Uruguay. On May 17, 2022, her nomination was sent to the Senate. On July 28, 2022, hearings on her nomination were held before the Senate Foreign Relations Committee. On August 3, 2022, the committee favorably reported her nomination to the Senate. On December 13, 2022, the Senate confirmed her nomination by voice vote. She was sworn in by Under Secretary Uzra Zeya on January 27, 2023, Fulton arrived in the country on February 13, 2023. She presented her credentials to the President Luis Lacalle Pou on March 22, 2023.

In December the ambassador met with the then president-elect, Yamantú Orsi. One of the main topics was the eventual visa waiver for Uruguayan citizens visiting the United States.

Diplomatic posts
Preceded by Karl Ríos; Chargé d'Affaires	United States Ambassador to Uruguay; 2023–2025	Succeeded by Lou Rinaldi
