= Morgan Meyer =

Texas legislator

Member of the Texas House of Representatives from the 108th district
- Incumbent
- Assumed office January 13, 2015
- Preceded by: Dan Branch

Personal details
- Born: Morgan Daniel Meyer; August 8, 1974 (age 51) Lubbock, Texas, U.S.
- Party: Republican
- Spouse: Keana
- Children: 3
- Education: Southern Methodist University (BA); Washington and Lee University (JD)
- Occupation: Attorney
- Website: Campaign website

Morgan Meyer (born August 8, 1974) is an American politician and attorney serving as a member of the Texas House of Representatives from the 108th district. First elected in November 2014, he assumed office in January 2015, and is serving his sixth consecutive term in the Legislature. Meyer's district is entirely located within Dallas County, and includes Downtown Dallas, Uptown and the Park Cities.

== Early life and education ==
Meyer was born in Lubbock, Texas. He earned a Bachelor of Arts degree in political science and history from Southern Methodist University and a Juris Doctor from the Washington and Lee University School of Law.

== Career ==
=== Legal experience ===
Meyer worked as an intern for Congressman Larry Combest and as a law clerk for Judge John McClellan Marshall. Meyer has since worked as an attorney at Bracewell LLP and Wick Phillips.

=== Legislative tenure ===
In November 2014, Meyer was elected to the Texas House of Representatives, filling the seat left open by Dan Branch upon his departure to run for Texas attorney general. Meyer assumed office in January 2015, and is now serving his sixth consecutive term in the House.

During the 2019–2020 legislative session, Meyer was the chair of the House General Investigating Committee.

In 2021, Meyer was named chair of the House Ways & Means Committee for the 87th Legislature, and has been re-appointed to that role twice.

In 2021, Meyer pushed for legislation that would extend a multibillion-dollar corporate tax incentive program in Texas. Investigative reporting by the Houston Chronicle revealed that nearly all applicants for the corporate tax incentive program had their applications approved, that dozens of companies failed to fulfill its pledges, and that some companies had already completed the projects that they had applied to the program for.

== Personal life ==
Meyer and his wife, Keana, have three children.

Texas House of Representatives
Preceded by Dan Branch	Member of the Texas House of Representatives from the 108th district 2015–present	Incumbent
