= Henry A. Hoyt =

American diplomat

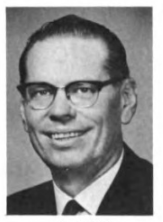

U.S. Ambassador to Uruguay
- In office June 14, 1965 – December 16, 1967
- President: Lyndon B. Johnson
- Preceded by: Wymberley DeRenne Coerr
- Succeeded by: Robert M. Sayre

Henry Augustus Hoyt (September 1, 1914 – December 16, 1967) was a U.S. Ambassador to Uruguay. He died at post of a heart attack.

== Early life and career ==
Hoyt was born in Jerome, Arizona. He graduated from the University of California, Berkeley in 1936. Only one year later, he joined the U.S. Foreign Service. In the Foreign Service, Hoyt served in Chihuahua, Tampico, Guadalajara, Manzanillo, Valparaiso, Asuncion, Havana, Caracas, and Montevideo. He attended the National War College in 1956. From 1961 to 1964, Hoyt served as the Consul General in Buenos Aires.

Before his ambassadorship, Hoyt was the director of the Office of Argentine, Paraguayan, and Uruguayan Affairs in the Bureau of Inter-American Affairs. He was appointed as Ambassador Extraordinary and Plenipotentiary to Uruguay by President Lyndon B. Johnson on May 6, 1965. Hoyt died of a heart attack after pitching in a softball game during an "American picnic."

== Personal life ==
Hoyt met his wife, Joyce Lownes Hoyt Robinson, while he was working at the U.S. embassy in Paraguay. They served together in the Foreign Service positions he held which pushed her to continue working in Latin American relations after Hoyt's death. They had four children.
