= List of ambassadors of the United States to Uruguay =

Ambassador of the United States to Uruguay
- Seal of the United States Department of State

- Flag of a United States ambassador

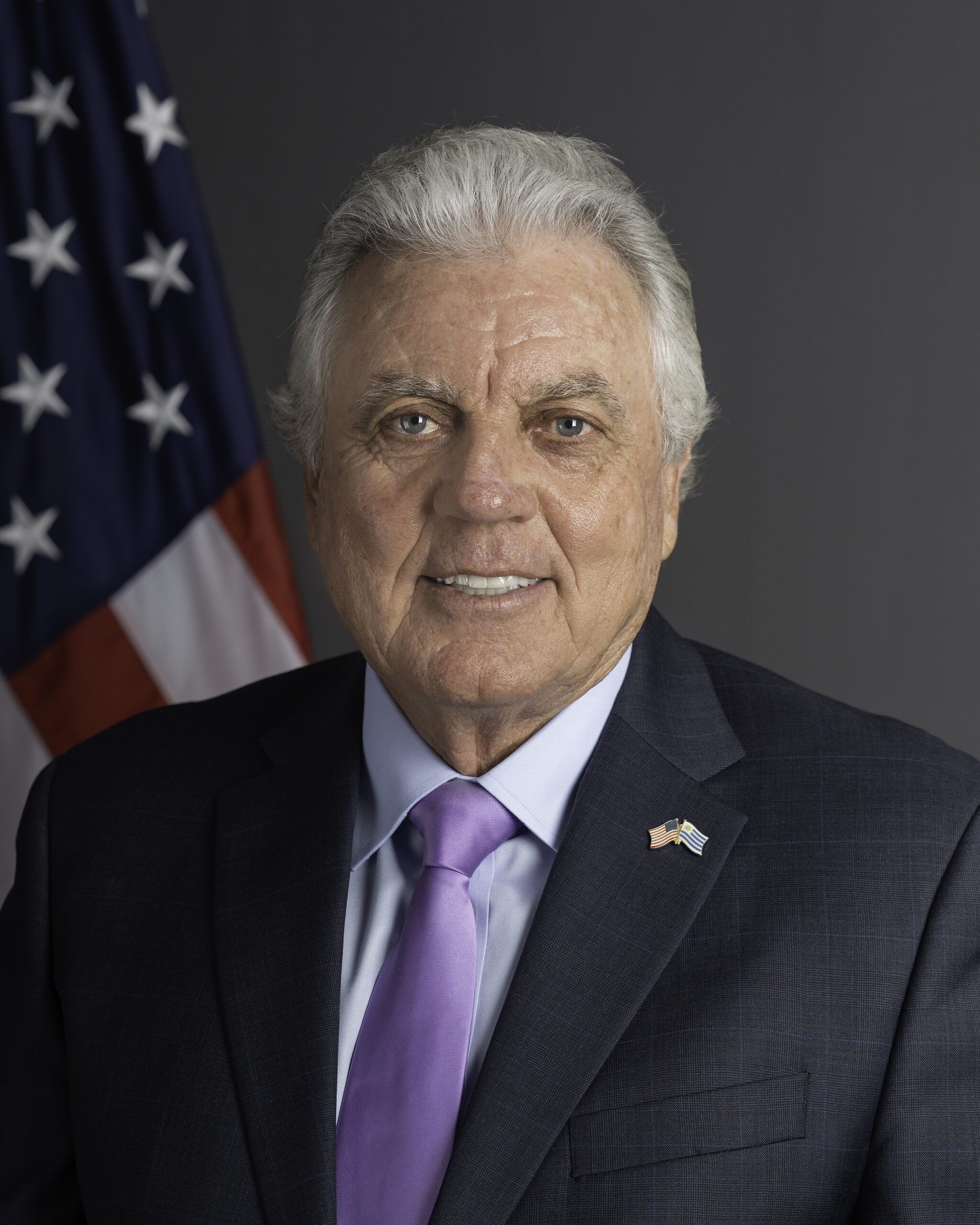
- Incumbent; Lou Rinaldi since September 30, 2025
- Nominator: The president of the United States
- Inaugural holder: Alexander Asboth as Minister Resident
- Formation: October 2, 1867
- Website: U.S. Embassy - Montevideo

The following is a list of United States ambassadors, or other chiefs of mission, to Uruguay. The current title given by the United States State Department to this position is Ambassador Extraordinary and Minister Plenipotentiary.

Representative	Title	Presentation of credentials	Termination of mission	Appointed by
Alexander Asboth	Minister Resident	October 2, 1867	January 21, 1868	Andrew Johnson
Henry G. Worthington	Minister Resident	October 24, 1868	July 10, 1869	Andrew Johnson
Robert C. Kirk	Minister Resident	July 24, 1869	July 6, 1870	Ulysses S. Grant
John L. Stevens	Minister Resident	July 6, 1870	May 19, 1873	Ulysses S. Grant
John C. Caldwell	Minister Resident	September 7, 1874	October 6, 1876	Ulysses S. Grant
John C. Caldwell	Chargé d'Affaires	October 6, 1876	July 10, 1882	Ulysses S. Grant
William Williams	Chargé d'Affaires	July 10, 1882	July 21, 1885	Chester A. Arthur
John E. Bacon	Chargé d'Affaires	July 21, 1885	October 8, 1888	Grover Cleveland
John E. Bacon	Minister Resident	October 8, 1888	December 26, 1888	Grover Cleveland
George Maney	Minister Resident	November 8, 1889	November 28, 1890	Benjamin Harrison
George Maney	Envoy Extraordinary and Minister Plenipotentiary	November 28, 1890	June 30, 1894	Benjamin Harrison
Granville Stuart	Envoy Extraordinary and Minister Plenipotentiary	July 2, 1894	January 4, 1898	Grover Cleveland
William R. Finch	Envoy Extraordinary and Minister Plenipotentiary	January 4, 1898	May 29, 1905	William McKinley
Edward C. O'Brien	Envoy Extraordinary and Minister Plenipotentiary	June 2, 1905	October 11, 1909	Theodore Roosevelt
Edwin V. Morgan	Envoy Extraordinary and Minister Plenipotentiary	March 31, 1910	July 8, 1911	William H. Taft
Nicolai A. Grevstad	Envoy Extraordinary and Minister Plenipotentiary	October 9, 1911	February 19, 1915	William H. Taft
Robert Emmett Jeffery	Envoy Extraordinary and Minister Plenipotentiary	June 4, 1915	March 9, 1921	Woodrow Wilson
Hoffman Philip	Envoy Extraordinary and Minister Plenipotentiary	September 19, 1922	April 10, 1925	Warren G. Harding
Ulysses Grant-Smith	Envoy Extraordinary and Minister Plenipotentiary	July 13, 1925	January 11, 1929	Calvin Coolidge
Leland Harrison	Envoy Extraordinary and Minister Plenipotentiary	April 11, 1930	October 9, 1930	Herbert Hoover
J. Butler Wright	Envoy Extraordinary and Minister Plenipotentiary	February 9, 1931	July 10, 1934	Herbert Hoover
Julius Gareché Lay	Envoy Extraordinary and Minister Plenipotentiary	May 20, 1935	August 31, 1937	Franklin D. Roosevelt
William Dawson	Envoy Extraordinary and Minister Plenipotentiary	February 10, 1938	June 6, 1939	Franklin D. Roosevelt
Edwin C. Wilson	Envoy Extraordinary and Minister Plenipotentiary	October 27, 1939	March 5, 1941	Franklin D. Roosevelt
William Dawson	Ambassador Extraordinary and Plenipotentiary	July 12, 1941	August 6, 1946	Franklin D. Roosevelt
Joseph F. McGurk	Ambassador Extraordinary and Plenipotentiary	November 28, 1946	April 15, 1947	Harry S. Truman
Ellis O. Briggs	Ambassador Extraordinary and Plenipotentiary	August 21, 1947	August 6, 1949	Harry S. Truman
Christian M. Ravndal	Ambassador Extraordinary and Plenipotentiary	September 9, 1949	October 8, 1951	Harry S. Truman
Edward L. Rodden	Ambassador Extraordinary and Plenipotentiary	December 27, 1951	October 12, 1953	Harry S. Truman
Dempster McIntosh	Ambassador Extraordinary and Plenipotentiary	November 12, 1953	April 3, 1956	Dwight D. Eisenhower
Jefferson Patterson	Ambassador Extraordinary and Plenipotentiary	May 2, 1956	March 18, 1958	Dwight D. Eisenhower
Robert F. Woodward	Ambassador Extraordinary and Plenipotentiary	April 21, 1958	March 29, 1961	Dwight D. Eisenhower
Edward J. Sparks	Ambassador Extraordinary and Plenipotentiary	May 24, 1961	May 15, 1962	John F. Kennedy
Wymberley DeRenne Coerr	Ambassador Extraordinary and Plenipotentiary	July 27, 1962	January 22, 1965	John F. Kennedy
Henry A. Hoyt	Ambassador Extraordinary and Plenipotentiary	June 14, 1965	December 16, 1967	Lyndon B. Johnson
Robert M. Sayre	Ambassador Extraordinary and Plenipotentiary	August 27, 1968	October 19, 1969	Lyndon B. Johnson
Charles W. Adair, Jr.	Ambassador Extraordinary and Plenipotentiary	November 13, 1969	September 28, 1972	Richard Nixon
Ernest V. Siracusa	Ambassador Extraordinary and Plenipotentiary	September 25, 1973	April 22, 1977	Richard Nixon
Lawrence Pezzulo	Ambassador Extraordinary and Plenipotentiary	August 10, 1977	May 29, 1979	Jimmy Carter
Lyle Franklin Lane	Ambassador Extraordinary and Plenipotentiary	October 17, 1979	July 22, 1980	Jimmy Carter
N. Shaw Smith	Chargé d'Affaires ad interim	July 22, 1980	November 5, 1981	Jimmy Carter
Thomas Aranda, Jr.	Ambassador Extraordinary and Plenipotentiary	November 5, 1981	November 14, 1985	Ronald Reagan
Malcolm Richard Wilkey	Ambassador Extraordinary and Plenipotentiary	November 28, 1985	May 10, 1990	Ronald Reagan
Richard C. Brown	Ambassador Extraordinary and Plenipotentiary	November 19, 1990	August 19, 1993	George H. W. Bush
Thomas J. Dodd, Jr.	Ambassador Extraordinary and Plenipotentiary	September 23, 1993	September 1, 1997	Bill Clinton
Christopher C. Ashby	Ambassador Extraordinary and Plenipotentiary	November 26, 1997	March 1, 2001	Bill Clinton
Martin J. Silverstein	Ambassador Extraordinary and Plenipotentiary	October 17, 2001	July 6, 2005	George W. Bush
Frank E. Baxter	Ambassador Extraordinary and Plenipotentiary	December 13, 2006	January 20, 2009	George W. Bush
David D. Nelson	Ambassador Extraordinary and Plenipotentiary	December 24, 2009	May 23, 2011	Barack Obama
Thomas H. Lloyd	Chargé d'Affaires a.i.	May 23, 2011	May 10, 2012	Barack Obama
Julissa Reynoso	Ambassador Extraordinary and Plenipotentiary	May 10, 2012	December 10, 2014	Barack Obama
Brad Freden	Chargé d'Affaires a.i.	December 10, 2014	June 23, 2016	Barack Obama
Kelly Keiderling	Ambassador Extraordinary and Plenipotentiary	June 23, 2016	June 29, 2019	Barack Obama; Donald Trump
Kenneth S. George	Ambassador Extraordinary and Plenipotentiary	September 2, 2019	January 20, 2021	Donald Trump
Jennifer Savage	Chargé d'Affaires	January 20, 2021	July 10, 2022	Joe Biden
Karl Rios	Chargé d'Affaires	July 15, 2022	March 22, 2023	Joe Biden
Heide B. Fulton	Ambassador Extraordinary and Plenipotentiary	March 22, 2023	June 27, 2025	Joe Biden
Chris Andino	Chargé d'Affaires	June 27, 2025	September 26, 2025	Donald Trump
Lou Rinaldi	Ambassador Extraordinary And Plenipotentiary	September 30, 2025		Donald Trump

== See also ==
- United States – Uruguay relations
- Foreign relations of Uruguay
- Ambassadors of the United States
