= Christopher C. Ashby =

American diplomat (born 1946)

Christopher Cox Ashby (born 1946) served as the United States Ambassador to Uruguay.

== Biography ==
=== Background and earlier life ===
Ashby was born in Dallas, Texas. He graduated from Georgetown University School of Foreign Service in 1968 where he was a member of the Philodemic Society, and received an M.B.A. from the University of Texas Graduate School of Business in 1970. He also attended the MIT Sloan School of Management and Harvard Business School.

He spent four years in the Marine Corps and served in Vietnam.

Longstanding social acquaintance of President Clinton

At Georgetown, he was Bill Clinton's roommate.

=== Career achievements ===
He worked in international banking, most notably for the Chemical Bank and Chase Manhattan Bank. He has also worked for the United Nations. He is a member of the Advisory Board of the Small Business Administration, and of the Foreign Policy Association of New York. He is married with four children.

=== United States Ambassador to Uruguay ===
He served as United States Ambassador to Uruguay under Bill Clinton and George W. Bush, from 1997 to 2001.

Family

His brother, Lynn C. Ashby, is a columnist for the Houston Chronicle and a former editorial and opinion page editor of the Houston Post.

Diplomatic posts
Preceded by Thomas J. Dodd, Jr.	United States Ambassador to Uruguay; 1997–2001	Succeeded by Martin J. Silverstein
