= Embassy of Uruguay, Washington, D.C. =

Embassy of Uruguay in Washington, D.C.
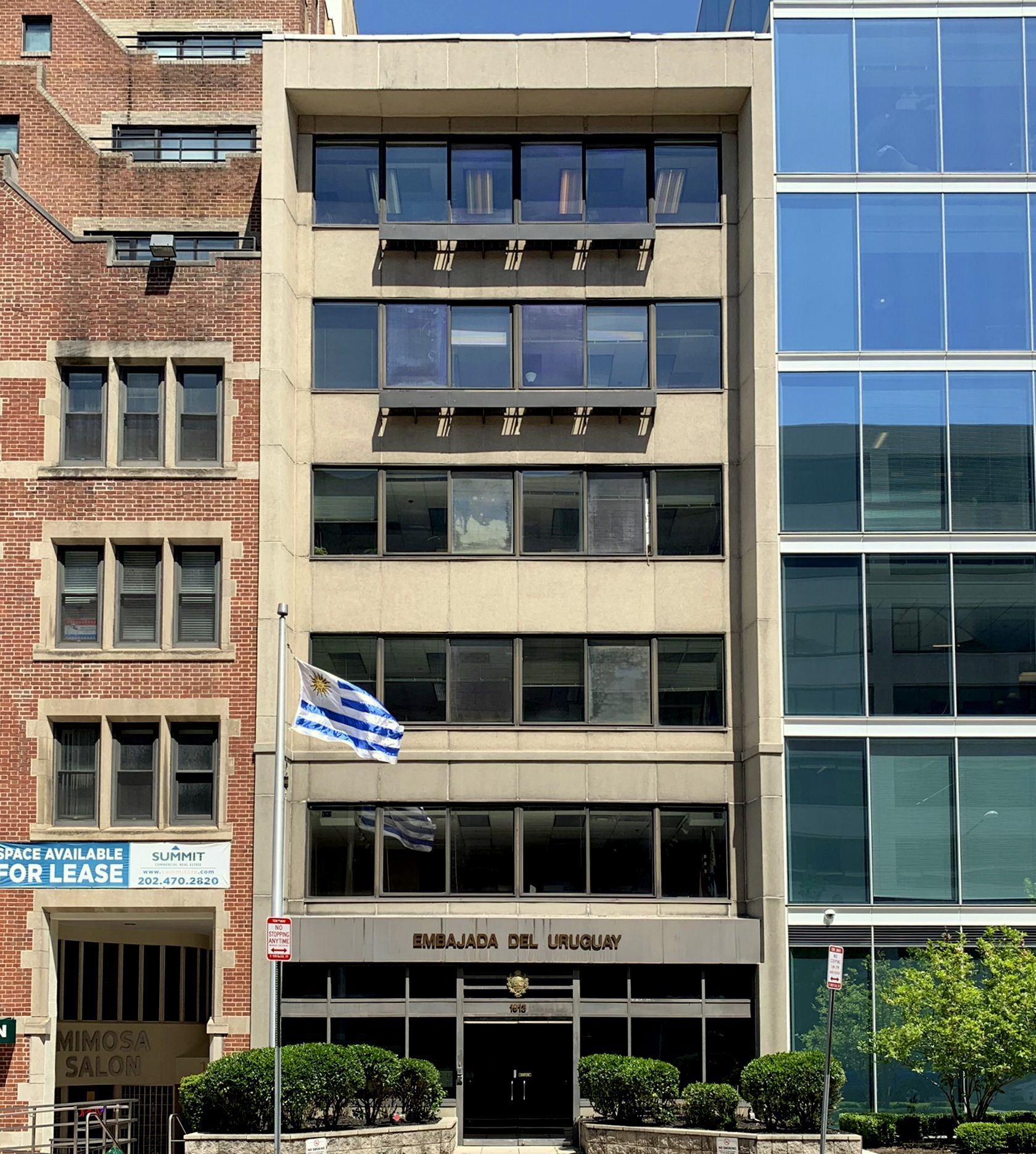
- Location: Downtown
- Address: 1913 I Street NW
- Coordinates: 38°54′06″N 77°02′39″W
- Ambassador: Andrés Durán Hareau

The Embassy of Uruguay in Washington, D.C., is the diplomatic mission of Uruguay to the United States.

The embassy also operates Consulates-General in Miami, New York City and San Francisco.

== Location ==
The embassy is located at 1913 I (Eye) Street NW in the Downtown Washington, D.C., area, near the International Monetary Fund, and George Washington University.

== Ambassador ==
The current ambassador of Uruguay to the United States is Andrés Durán Hareau.

== See also ==
- Uruguay-United States relations
- Foreign relations of Uruguay
- List of Washington, D.C., embassies
