= Frank E. Baxter =

American businessman and diplomat (1936–2025)

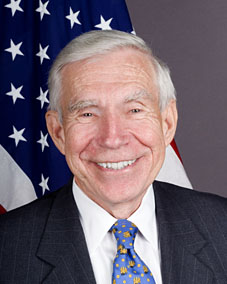

United States Ambassador to Uruguay
- In office 2006–2009
- President: George W. Bush
- Preceded by: Martin J. Silverstein
- Succeeded by: David D. Nelson

Personal details
- Born: November 20, 1936 California, U.S.
- Died: July 15, 2025 (aged 88)
- Party: Republican
- Profession: Businessman

Frank Edward Baxter (November 20, 1936 – July 15, 2025) was an American businessman and diplomat. A member of the Republican Party, he was the United States Ambassador to Uruguay from 2006 to 2009 under President George W. Bush.

Baxter died on July 15, 2025, at the age of 88.

== Biography ==
=== Early life ===
Frank E. Baxter was born in Northern California in 1936. He served in the U.S. Air Force for four years. In 1961, he graduated from the University of California, Berkeley with a B.A. in economics.

=== Career ===
From 1961 to 1963, he worked for the Bank of California in San Francisco. In 1963, he joined J.S. Strauss and Company, San Francisco. From 1974 to 2002, he worked for Jefferies and Company. By 1987, he became its CEO, and started the Investment Technology Group.

He has served on the board of directors of NASDAQ and the Securities Industry Association. He is also chairman of the board of Governors of Fremont College.

He is also the chairman of the board of Alliance for College-Ready Public Schools and After-School All Stars. He is a board member of the California Institute of the Arts, a member of the Board of Councilors at the USC Rossier School of Education, a member of Governor Schwarzenegger's Commission for Jobs and Economic Growth, Vice chairman of the board of the Los Angeles Opera, chairman of the executive committee of the Los Angeles County Museum of Art. He sits on the Board of Overseers of the Hoover Institution. He is a Trustee of the UC Berkeley Foundation and the LA Chapter of the I Have A Dream Foundation. He is a member of the Council of American Ambassadors. Baxter is a member of the board of directors of the Pacific Council on International Policy.

He is a member of the California Club, the Los Angeles Country Club, the Siwanoy Country Club, and the University Club of New York. He is the recipient of the Bet Tzedek award.

== US Ambassador to Uruguay ==
Baxter was appointed Ambassador to Uruguay on October 4, 2006, and assumed office on December 13 the same year.

During Baxter's term, the US-Uruguay Trade and Investment Framework Agreement went into effect.

His term also coincided with a period of tension over alleged CIA involvement in the assassination of Cecilia Fontana de Héber. Cecilia Fontana was from a prominent family — spouse of a National Party leader, mother of a National Party politician who was appointed to serve in the government of President of Uruguay Luis Alberto Lacalle Pou in 2020 and sister-in-law to a President of Uruguay who served in the 1960s — and had died in 1978 after drinking from a bottle of poisoned wine. Citing communications obtained from the 2010 United States diplomatic cables leak, El País reported that Baxter delivered a request for declassification of documents related to the matter from Uruguayan President Tabaré Vázquez to George W. Bush in April 2008. The paper further reported that Baxter had pushed back by bringing up the killing of Dan Mitrione and expressed the hope "that the poisoned wine case has definitely been laid to rest".

Baxter left the post in February 2009 and was succeeded by David D. Nelson.

=== See also ===
- Mario Héber Usher § Family incident
- Luis Alberto Héber § Family incident and diplomatic repercussions
- Dan Mitrione § Commemoration
- E. Howard Hunt § Mexico, Guatemala, Japan, Uruguay and Cuba

Diplomatic posts
Preceded by Martin J. Silverstein	United States Ambassador to Uruguay; 2006–2009	Succeeded by David D. Nelson
