= Heraclio Ruggia =

Heraclio Ruggia was an Uruguayan engineer and politician. He was born in Mercedes on May 15, 1902. He obtained a degree in civil engineering, after which he became a member of the Postal Directory. He was named Chairman of the State Directory of Factories and Telephones (UTE) between February 1948 and February 1951. He was a member of the National Aerodrome Commission on Aerodromes.

Politically Ruggia was a Batllista. Ruggia was named as Minister of Public Works in the cabinet of Óscar Diego Gestido on March 1, 1967. On October 10, 1967, Ruggia and other Batllista ministers resigned from the cabinet in protest against Gestido's decree introducing 'Immediate Security Measures' the preceding day.

Ruggia died on July 7, 1970. In 1982 the municipal government of Montevideo named a street after Heraclio Ruggia.
