= Kenn George =

American businessman and ambassador (born 1948)

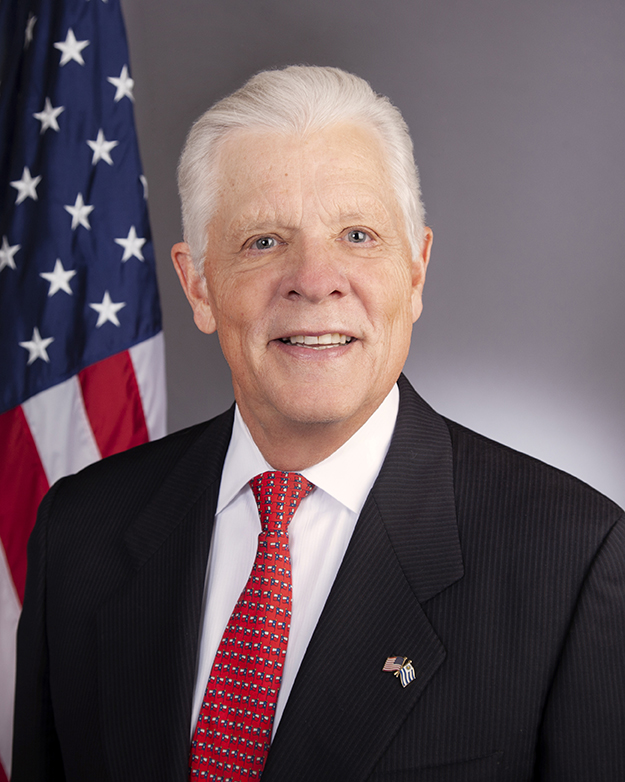
- Official portrait, 2019

United States Ambassador to Uruguay
- In office September 2, 2019 – January 20, 2021
- Appointed by: Donald Trump
- Preceded by: Kelly Keiderling
- Succeeded by: Heide B. Fulton

Member of the Texas House of Representatives from the 108th district
- In office January 6, 1999 – January 8, 2003
- Preceded by: Carolyn Galloway
- Succeeded by: Dan Branch

Assistant Secretary of the United States Commercial Service
- In office January 20, 1981 – January 20, 1985
- President: Ronald Reagan
- Preceded by: Robert Herzstein
- Succeeded by: J. Michael Farren

Personal details
- Born: Kenneth Suggeet George II; June 25, 1948 (age 78) Midland, Texas, U.S.
- Party: Republican
- Spouse: Tricia Mast (m. 1975)
- Children: 4
- Education: Washington and Lee University (AB); University of Texas (MBA)

Military service
- Allegiance: United States
- Branch/service: Texas National Guard; Texas Army National Guard
- Years of service: 1970–1976
- Rank: First Lieutenant
- Unit: 36th Infantry Division

Kenneth Suggeet George II (born June 25, 1948 in Midland, Texas) is an American businessman, politician and diplomat who served as the United States Ambassador to Uruguay from September 2, 2019 to January 20, 2021.

In the federal government, he has also been Assistant Secretary/Director General of the US & Foreign Commercial Service in the Department of Commerce from 1981 until 1985. In the private sector, George was the founder, Chairman and CEO of EPIC Healthcare Group from 1988 to 1994 and, immediately before becoming ambassador, the owner, and manager of Blue Harbor Plantation and Blue Harbor Tropical Arboretum in Roatan, Honduras since 2009. He also served as a State Representative from Dallas County in the Texas House of Representatives from 1999 until 2003.

George earned a B.A. from Washington and Lee University and a M.B.A. from the University of Texas at Austin.

== Life and education ==
Native Texan George attended San Jacinto Junior High School in Midland with George W. Bush, who is two years George's senior. In 1970, George graduated from Washington and Lee University in Lexington, Virginia. He earned his Master of Business Administration from the University of Texas at Austin, where he was the student body president of the graduate business school. Like Bush, George is a veteran of the Texas National Guard. George and his wife, Tricia, have four children.

== Political career ==
From 1981 to 1985, George was an assistant secretary of commerce, under Malcolm Baldrige, Jr., during the first term of U.S. President Ronald Reagan. In this capacity, George was involved in the formulation of the Caribbean Basin Initiative, experience which led to his selection as ambassador to Uruguay. and the specific stabilization of the Caribbean island of Grenada after its liberation in 1983 from a leftist regime backed by Fidel Castro. The CBI, since overshadowed by the North American Free Trade Agreement, was an unprecedented package of trade, assistance, and tax incentives for United States and Caribbean businesses. In the additional role as the Director General of the U.S. and Foreign Commercial Service, George chaired an inter-agency committee that oversees the operations of the CBI.

In 1998, George unseated incumbent Republican State Representative Carolyn Galloway in the party primary, 6,063 votes (56.4 percent) to 4,867 (43.6 percent). He was then unopposed in the general election, having won 27,220 votes. Four years later in the two-man land commissioner's race, George trailed with 252,802 votes (43.5 percent) to Patterson's 328,523 (56.5 percent). George was succeeded in the House by Moderate Republican attorney Dan Branch, a devotee of former U.S. Senator John Tower.

As a state lawmaker, George sided with conservatives in seeking lower taxes, local control over education, and an improved business climate. He also advocated improved health care for senior citizens. The Texas Association of Business and Chambers of Commerce cited George with a "100 percent pro-business voting record. He has also been honored by Right to Life in Austin, the American Cancer Society, and the Texas Transplant Society. George wrote the House bill establishing the Umbilical Cord Blood Bank, which provides medical researchers an ethical alternative to stem cell research.

George's Republican credentials began in 1964, when as a sixteen-year-old he volunteered in Midland to work in the unsuccessful Barry Goldwater presidential bid against President Lyndon B. Johnson. He was an early supporter of George W. Bush, having been part of the unsuccessful congressional race in 1978 against then Democrat and later Republican Kent Hance, the former chancellor of Texas Tech University in Lubbock. He was also the Midland County Republican finance chairman at the time. Thereafter, he was the Texas GOP state finance chairman from 1980 to 1981. Over the years, George worked in campaigns of former U.S. Senator William Gramm, U.S. Representatives Pete Sessions and Jeb Hensarling, then Texas Governor Rick Perry, and unsuccessful 1990 candidates Jack Rains, who contested the gubernatorial nomination against Kent Hance, Clayton Wheat Williams, Jr., and Robert Mosbacher, Jr., the Houston businessman who challenged Democrat Bob Bullock for lieutenant governor that same year.

After his legislative service, George became self-employed in Dallas in investments. In 2002, he joined the board of directors of the interest group, Citizens for a Sound Economy. He remains a large Republican donor, having contributed to Mike Huckabee, Mitt Romney, and Rudy Giuliani in the 2008 Republican Party presidential primaries.

As the chairman of the Dallas County Republican Party, George and then state Representative Tony Goolsby of House District 102 were sued for libel in 2007 in the 192nd Texas District Court in Dallas by Goolsby's former Democratic legislative opponent, Harriet Miller. The suit contends that George and Goolsby filed a false voter complaint against Miller with the Dallas County district attorney. Miller then claimed that the complaint was used in 2006 to attack her campaign and to suppress African-American voter turnout.

== Business ==
George is a former president of Olix Industries, a publicly traded energy company. He co-founded Epic Healthcare Group, a $1.4 billion corporation with nearly 15,000 employees operating in 37 hospitals in 30 states. George is also a former executive with Trammell Crow real estate development in Dallas and a third-generation rancher. He now owns Blue Harbor Tropical, a tour company.
