= Lou Rinaldi (businessman) =

Uruguayan-American businessman

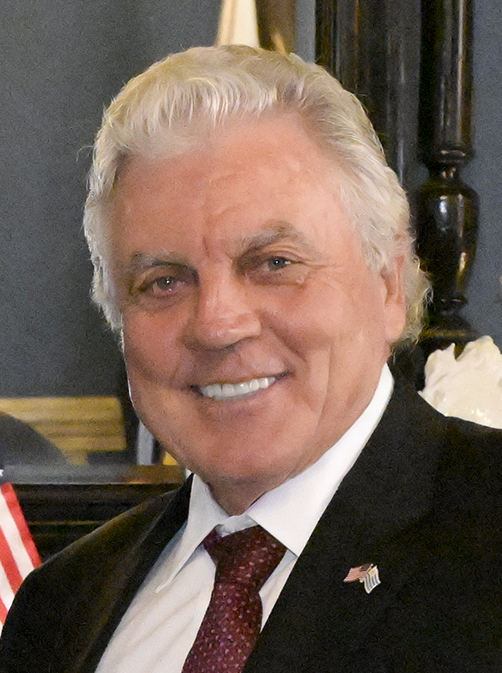
- Rinaldi in 2025

United States Ambassador to Uruguay
- Incumbent
- Assumed office September 30, 2025
- President: Donald Trump
- Preceded by: Heide B. Fulton

Personal details
- Born: June 14, 1954 (age 72) Italy
- Spouse: Lauretta Rinaldi
- Children: 4
- Education: University of Labor of Uruguay

Louis Rinaldi (born June 14, 1954) is a Uruguayan-American businessman who has served as the United States Ambassador to Uruguay since September 30, 2025.

== Early life and career ==
Rinaldi was born in Italy but his family emigrated to Uruguay when he was four and a half years old where he lived with his six siblings and parents on a ranch in Villa Colón, Montevideo. There he completed his primary studies at School No. 124 in Melilla and School No. 127 in Pueblo Ferrocarril. He graduated from the University of Labor of Uruguay as a mechanical turner. He and his family emigrated to the United States when he was nineteen where he worked in construction in New York.

In 1975, he started his own construction company known as Louis Rinaldi Inc.

== Ambassador nomination ==
In December 2024, then President-elect Donald Trump named Rinaldi as his nominee for ambassador to Uruguay. He presented his credentials to President Yamandú Orsi on September 30, 2025.

== Personal life ==
He met his wife, Lauretta, in the 1970s when she was teaching him English. They live in Westchester County, New York.

In 2013, one of his four children died at the age of 28.

Rinaldi frequently visits Uruguay and is a supporter of Uruguayan soccer team Peñarol.

Rinaldi met future President Donald Trump at a golf course in the summer of 1993. He knew Trump did not like shaking hands, due to hygiene reasons, while playing golf, so he told Trump that he was only going to shake his hand because they shared the same birthday, June 14.

Uruguayan President Luis Lacalle Pou called Rinaldi in June 2020 after he had played a golf match with Trump to greet him for his birthday.

Diplomatic posts
Preceded by Heide B. Fulton	United States Ambassador to Uruguay; 2025–present	Incumbent
