= José Luis Falero =

Uruguayan politician (born 1966)

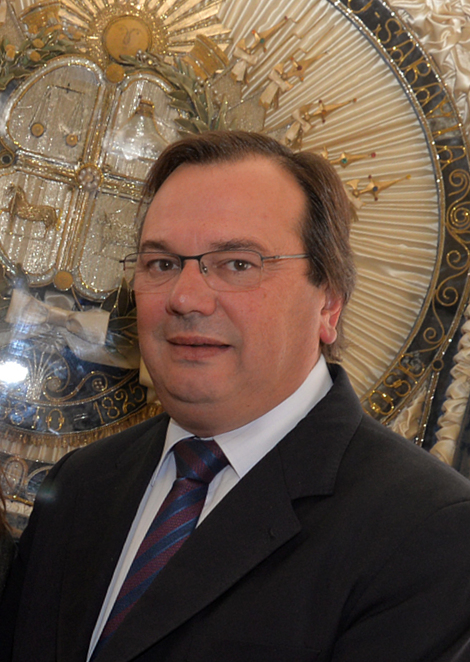

Minister of Transport and Public Works
- In office 25 May 2021 – 1 March 2025
- President: Luis Lacalle Pou
- Preceded by: Luis Alberto Héber
- Succeeded by: Lucía Etcheverry

Deputy Director of the Office of Planning and Budget
- In office 1 March 2020 – 24 May 2021
- President: Luis Lacalle Pou
- Preceded by: Santiago Soto Baracchini
- Succeeded by: Benjamín Irazábal

Intendant of San José
- In office 8 July 2010 – 2020
- Preceded by: Juan Chiruchi
- Succeeded by: Pedro Bidegain

Secretary General of the Municipality of San José
- In office 7 July 2005 – 9 July 2010
- Preceded by: Beatriz Martínez
- Succeeded by: Ana María Bentaberri

Personal details
- Born: José Luis Falero; 19 May 1966 (age 59) San José de Mayo, Uruguay
- Party: National Party
- Spouses: María del Pilar Miguel Cachés; Rossina Zaffaroni Fabra
- Children: Rodrigo; José Manuel

José Luis Falero Bértola (born 19 May 1966) is a Uruguayan businessman and politician of the National Party, serving as senator of the Republic since 2025. He previously served as Minister of Transport and Public Works from 2021 to 2025 under president Luis Lacalle Pou.

== Political career ==
He began his political career in 1995 as a member of the Departmental Board of San José, being its spokesperson in 2000. From 2005 to 2010 he held the position of Secretary General of the Municipality of San José. In this year's elections he was elected Intendant of San José, with 56.5% of the vote. In the 2015 elections, he was reelected with 57.0%. From 2012 to 2015 he also served as president of SUCIVE (Unique Vehicle Income Collection System).

In July 2015 he served as a temporary senator of the Republic, having been elected by the "Todos" sector. In this same year he is appointed Director of the Honorable Directory of the National Party being also one of the three secretaries.

In March 2020, with the Lacalle Pou administration, he took the position of deputy director of the Office of Planning and Budget (OPP), resigning on March 3 from the departmental government of San José, being replaced by his alternate Pedro Bidegain. On 24 May 2021, with the cabinet reshuffle after the death of the then Interior Minister Jorge Larrañaga, Falero was appointed Minister of Transport and Public Works to replace Luis Alberto Heber, who was appointed head of the deceased's portfolio. His position as deputy director of the OPP was filled by Benjamín Irazábal.

== Personal life ==
He married María del Pilar Miguel Cachés (who died in 2012), he has two children, Rodrigo and José Manuel. In November 2016, he married Rossina Zaffaroni Fabra.
