= Víctor Rossi =

Uruguayan politician

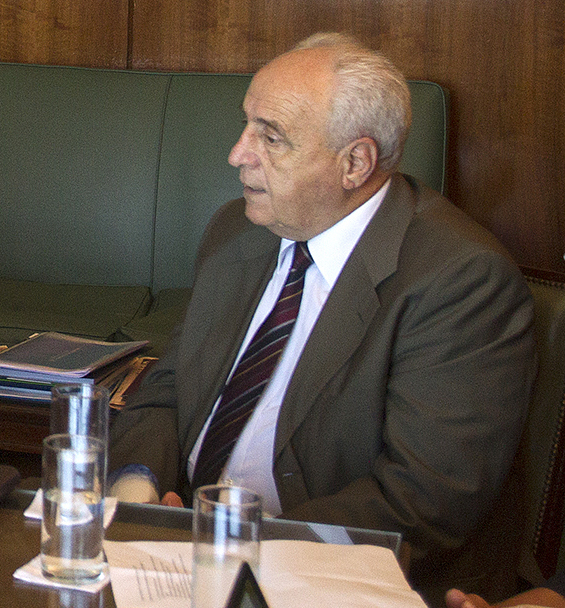
Víctor Rossi

Víctor Rossi (La Paz, Canelones Department, 10 April 1943) is a Uruguayan politician.

A member of the Broad Front, he is serving his second term as Minister of Transportation and Public Works.
