= Taglialatela =

Taglialatela is an Italian surname. Notable people with the surname include:

- Giuseppe Taglialatela (born 1969), Italian footballer and coach
- Linda Swartz Taglialatela (born 1949), American diplomat
