= Charles A. Ford =

American Department of Commerce official and diplomat

Charles Ford
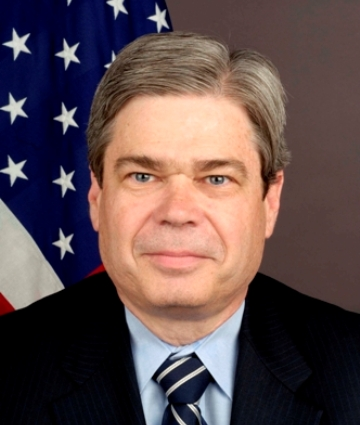

Director General of the United States Commercial Service
- In office 2010 – April 2013
- President: Barack Obama

United States Ambassador to Honduras
- In office November 8, 2005 – March 18, 2008
- President: George W. Bush
- Preceded by: Larry Leon Palmer
- Succeeded by: Hugo Llorens

Personal details
- Born: Charles Arthur Ford; May 1950 (age 76) Dayton, Ohio, U.S.
- Education: College of William & Mary (B.A.); George Washington University (M.A.)

Charles Arthur Ford is an American former United States Department of Commerce official and diplomat who served as the director general of the United States Commercial Service from 2010 to 2013 and U.S. Ambassador to Honduras from 2005 to 2008.

== Career ==
Retired since 2019, Ford was the president of CAF International from 2013-2019, an international market development, and strategic communication, and change management consultancy firm.

Previously, Ford was acting assistant secretary of the United States Commercial Service at the United States Department of Commerce. In this role, he managed a $270 million budget and 1400 employees located in more than 70 countries. From 2008 to 2009, he was the advisor on public-private partnerships to the Commander of United States Southern Command. He served as the U.S. Ambassador to Honduras from 2005 to 2008.

As a member of the United States Foreign Commercial Service since 1982, Ford worked in Europe and Latin America. He was a commercial minister at the U.S. Mission to the European Union in Brussels, Belgium, commercial counselor at the U.S. Embassy in Caracas, Venezuela, commercial minister at the U.S. Embassy in London, United Kingdom, commercial attaché at the U.S. Embassy in Guatemala, commercial consul at the U.S. Consulate in Barcelona, Spain, and commercial attaché at the U.S. Embassy in Buenos Aires, Argentina.

From 1992 to 1994, he was the deputy assistant secretary for International Operations of the Commerce Department's US and Foreign Commercial Service. Previously he was director of Latin American Trade Policy in the Commerce Department's International Trade Administration.

=== Memberships ===
Ford has been a member of the American Foreign Service Association since 1982, serving as Treasurer of the American Foreign Service Association from 2013-2017. He is a member of the American Academy of Diplomacy and served on its Board of Directors from 2014-2020. He also was on the board of several organizations, including the PDI Group (2014-2019) and the Advisory Board of the College of William and Mary's Thomas Jefferson Program in Public Policy from 2012-2015 .

== Personal life ==
Ford lives in the Washington D.C. area and is married to Lillian Ford. They have two adult children.

Diplomatic posts
Preceded by Larry Leon Palmer	United States Ambassador to Honduras; November 8, 2005–March 18, 2008	Succeeded by Hugo Llorens
