= Joseph Sweeney =

Joseph Sweeney may refer to:

- Joseph Sweeney (actor) (1884–1963), US actor
- Joseph Sweeney (American politician) (born 1993), New Hampshire state representative
- Joseph Sweeney (Irish politician) (1897–1980), Irish Sinn Féin politician from Donegal
- Joseph Modeste Sweeney (1920–2000), dean of the Tulane University Law School
- Joe Sweeney (wrestler) (1933–2016), Australian Olympic wrestler

== See also ==
- Joel Sweeney (1810–1860), commonly known as Joe Sweeney, musician
