= Paul R. Verkuil =

American attorney and educator

10th Chair of the Administrative Conference of the United States
- In office April 6, 2010 – October 1, 2015
- President: Barack Obama
- Preceded by: Thomasina Rogers
- Succeeded by: Steven P. Croley (acting)

24th President of the College of William & Mary
- In office July 1, 1985 – January 7, 1992
- Preceded by: Thomas Ashley Graves Jr.
- Succeeded by: Timothy J. Sullivan

Personal details
- Born: Paul Robert Verkuil; December 4, 1939 (age 86) Staten Island, New York, U.S.
- Spouse: Judith Rodin
- Education: College of William & Mary (BA); University of Virginia (JD); New School for Social Research (MA); New York University (LLM, JSD)
- Profession: Educator

Paul Robert Verkuil (born December 4, 1939) is an American lawyer, legal scholar, and academic administrator. He served as president of the College of William & Mary from 1985 to 1992, dean of Tulane Law School from 1978 to 1985, and dean of Benjamin N. Cardozo School of Law from 1997 to 2001. He was chairman of the Administrative Conference of the United States (ACUS) from 2010 to 2015, after being nominated by President Barack Obama and confirmed by the United States Senate. He has also served as a Special Master of the Supreme Court of the United States in New Jersey v. New York, president and chief executive officer of the American Automobile Association, and senior counsel at Boies, Schiller & Flexner. His scholarship focuses primarily on administrative law, regulation, public administration, privatization, and government contracting. He is the author or co-author of several books, including Outsourcing Sovereignty and Valuing Bureaucracy.

== Biography ==
He attended Curtis High School in Staten Island, New York, before enrolling at the College of William & Mary, where he received a Bachelor of Arts degree in English literature in 1961. He subsequently served in the United States Army from 1962-64, stationed at Ft Lee, Va. He earned his law degree from the University of Virginia in 1967, followed by an LL.M. in trade regulation from New York University in 1969. He received a master's degree in political science and economics from the New School for Social Research in 1971 and a Doctor of Juridical Science degree from New York University in 1972.

While at the University of Virginia, Verkuil served as an editor of the Virginia Law Review and was recognized as the outstanding third-year editor. He was also elected to the Raven Society. His student note was cited by the Supreme Court in the Fortnightly case.

== Career ==
Verkuil began his legal career in private practice in New York. He worked as an associate at Cravath, Swaine & Moore from 1967 to 1969, primarily in litigation, and subsequently joined Paul, Weiss, Goldberg, Rifkind, Wharton & Garrison, where he worked from 1969 to 1971.

He entered academia in 1971 as a member of the faculty of the University of North Carolina School of Law. He progressed from assistant professor to Kenan Research Professor and remained at the school until 1978. He then became dean of Tulane Law School and the Joseph M. Jones Professor of Law, serving from 1978 to 1985.

In 1985, Verkuil became the 24th president of the College of William & Mary, serving until January 1992. During his presidency, he led a major fundraising campaign, oversaw the development of the Wendy and Emery Reves Center for International Studies, founded the Thomas Jefferson Program in Public Policy, and oversaw the establishment of doctoral programs in American studies, computer science, and applied science. He also played a role in the restoration of the position of chancellor, which had been vacant since 1974. Warren E. Burger became chancellor in 1987.

Following his presidency, Verkuil became president and chief executive officer of the American Automobile Association, serving from 1992 to 1994. He subsequently served as a Special Master of the Supreme Court of the United States in New Jersey v. New York, an original-jurisdiction case concerning competing claims to sovereignty over Ellis Island. He held the position from 1994 to 1997. The Supreme Court ultimately decided the case in 1998.

Verkuil returned to legal academia as dean and professor of law at Benjamin N. Cardozo School of Law, Yeshiva University, serving as dean from 1997 to 2001. He continued as a professor there thereafter. He also served as a visiting professor at the University of Pennsylvania Law School and held visiting appointments at other universities, including Duke University, Indiana University, and Columbia University.

From 2001 to 2010, Verkuil was senior counsel at the law firm Boies, Schiller & Flexner. His work there included oversight of the firm's pro bono program and participation in matters involving antitrust and corporate governance.He also served as acting dean of the University of Miami School of Law from 2008 to 2009.

In 2010, President Barack Obama nominated Verkuil to chair the Administrative Conference of the United States. The United States Senate unanimously confirmed him on March 3, 2010, and he was sworn in on April 6. He became the tenth chairman of ACUS following the agency's reconstitution after a 15-year hiatus. He served until 2015. During his tenure, ACUS worked on recommendations concerning federal administrative procedure, regulation, adjudication, government management, and judicial review. Verkuil emphasized consensus-based recommendations and bipartisan participation.

After leaving ACUS, Verkuil became a senior fellow at the Center for American Progress, where his work focused on government effectiveness, civil-service reform, and the regulatory process. He subsequently served as a senior fellow of ACUS and the National Academy of Public Administration, working on civil-service reform and government reorganization. He is also president emeritus of William & Mary and a life member of the American Law Institute and the Fellows of the American Bar Foundation.

== Research ==
Verkuil's scholarship has focused on administrative law, regulatory policy, public administration, government organization, and the relationship between public institutions and private contractors. His early academic work addressed regulation and administrative procedure, while his later scholarship increasingly examined the effects of privatization and outsourcing on government accountability.

A major theme of his work is the legal and institutional role of government agencies. In Outsourcing Sovereignty: Why Privatization of Government Functions Threatens Democracy and What We Can Do About It (2007), he examined the delegation of government functions to private contractors and argued that extensive privatization could raise questions concerning accountability, public authority, and democratic control.

His later book Valuing Bureaucracy: The Case for Professional Government (2017) examined the role of professional civil servants and the consequences of contracting out government functions. Drawing on his experience in government and academia, Verkuil argued for maintaining professional capacity within the public sector while pursuing reforms to improve recruitment, performance, and accountability.

Another continuing subject of his scholarship has been the administrative state and regulatory process. His work has addressed administrative procedure, government contracting, cross-agency coordination, regulatory reform, and the relationship between administrative law and public management. During his tenure at ACUS, he also participated in work examining how federal agencies could improve coordination under the Government Performance and Results Act Modernization Act.

His 1998 article, “Speculating About the Next Administrative Conference: Connecting Public Management to the Legal Process,” proposed a renewed institutional approach to public management that would connect administrative law with questions of government organization and management.

Verkuil has published more than 60 articles on public law and regulation and has been the subject of a Festschrift published in the Cardozo Law Review in 2011. The collection included contributions examining his scholarship, administrative-law work, leadership at Cardozo, and role in the Administrative Conference.

He is currently a founding member of Reform for Results, a group of academics and former government officials who are seeking to improve the Civil Service. He also serves on the advisory board of the Goldman School of Public Policy at UC Berkeley.

== Awards and honors ==
- NYU Founders Day Award, 1972, for “Consistent Evidence of Outstanding Scholarship.”
- Marshall-Wythe Medallion, William & Mary Law School, 2008, the law school's highest honor.
- Honorary Doctor of Public Service, College of William & Mary, 2017.
- Order of the Coif, University of North Carolina School of Law.
- Life membership, American Law Institute.
- Life membership, American Bar Foundation.

== Selected publications ==
- Harrison, J. L., Morgan, T. D., & Verkuil, P. R. (1985). Economic Regulation of Business: Cases and Materials. West.
- Harrison, J. L., Morgan, T. D., & Verkuil, P. R. (2004). Regulation and Deregulation: Cases and Materials (2nd ed.). Thomson/West.
- Pierce, R. J., Jr., Shapiro, S. A., & Verkuil, P. R. (2004). Administrative Law and Process (4th ed.). Foundation Press.
- Verkuil, P. R. (2007). Outsourcing Sovereignty: Why Privatization of Government Functions Threatens Democracy and What We Can Do About It. Cambridge University Press.
- Verkuil, P. R., & Fountain, J. E. (2014). The Administrative Conference of the United States: Recommendations to advance cross-agency collaboration under the GPRA Modernization Act. Public Administration Review, 74(1), 10–11.
- Verkuil, P. R. (2015). ACUS 2.0: Present at the recreation. George Washington Law Review, 83(4–5), 1133–1141.
- Verkuil, P. R. (2017). Valuing Bureaucracy: The Case for Professional Government. Cambridge University Press.

Academic offices
Preceded by Joseph Modeste Sweeney	Tulane University Law School Dean; 1978–1985	Succeeded by John R. Kramer
