= Ralph Becker =

Ralph Becker may refer to:

- Ralph Elihu Becker (1907–1994), American ambassador to Honduras, 1976–1977
- Ralph Becker (mayor) (born 1952), American politician, attorney and mayor of Salt Lake City, Utah
