= Everett Ellis Briggs =

United States diplomat (born 1934)

United States Ambassador to Portugal
- In office May 25, 1990 – September 3, 1993
- President: George H. W. Bush; Bill Clinton
- Preceded by: Edward Morgan Rowell
- Succeeded by: Elizabeth Frawley Bagley

16th United States Ambassador to Honduras
- In office November 4, 1986 – June 15, 1989
- President: Ronald Reagan; George H. W. Bush
- Preceded by: John Arthur Ferch
- Succeeded by: Cresencio S. Arcos, Jr.

United States Ambassador to Panama
- In office October 29, 1982 – February 24, 1986
- President: Ronald Reagan
- Preceded by: Ambler Holmes Moss, Jr.
- Succeeded by: Arthur H. Davis, Jr.

Personal details
- Born: April 6, 1934 (age 92) Havana, Cuba
- Parent: Ellis O. Briggs (father)
- Education: Dartmouth College
- Profession: Diplomat

Everett Ellis Briggs (born April 6, 1934, in Havana, Cuba) is a United States diplomat.

Briggs was born in Havana, Cuba in 1934, to Ellis Ormsbee Briggs and Lucy Barnard Briggs, where his father was stationed as a U.S. diplomat.

He is an alumnus of Dartmouth College.

He served as United States Ambassador to Panama from 1982 to 1986, United States Ambassador to Honduras from 1986 to 1989, and United States Ambassador to Portugal from 1990 to 1993. He also served abroad in Bolivia, Occupied Berlin, Angola, Paraguay and Colombia.

He worked to indict Manuel Noriega, during his term in Panama. He was Special Assistant to the President for National Security Affairs, on the National Security Council.

He was president of the Americas Society and Council of the Americas.

He is the author of two memoirs, Ambassador's Apprentice and Honor to State (2018).

== Sources ==
- Everett Ellis Briggs at The Political Graveyard
- Appearances on C-SPAN

Diplomatic posts
Preceded by Ambler Holmes Moss, Jr.	United States Ambassador to Panama; 1982–1986	Succeeded by Arthur H. Davis, Jr.
Preceded by John Arthur Ferch	United States Ambassador to Honduras; 1986–1989	Succeeded by Cresencio S. Arcos, Jr.
Preceded by Edward Morgan Rowell	United States Ambassador to Portugal; 1990–1993	Succeeded by Elizabeth Frawley Bagley
