= Mari-Luci Jaramillo =

American educator and diplomat (1928–2019)

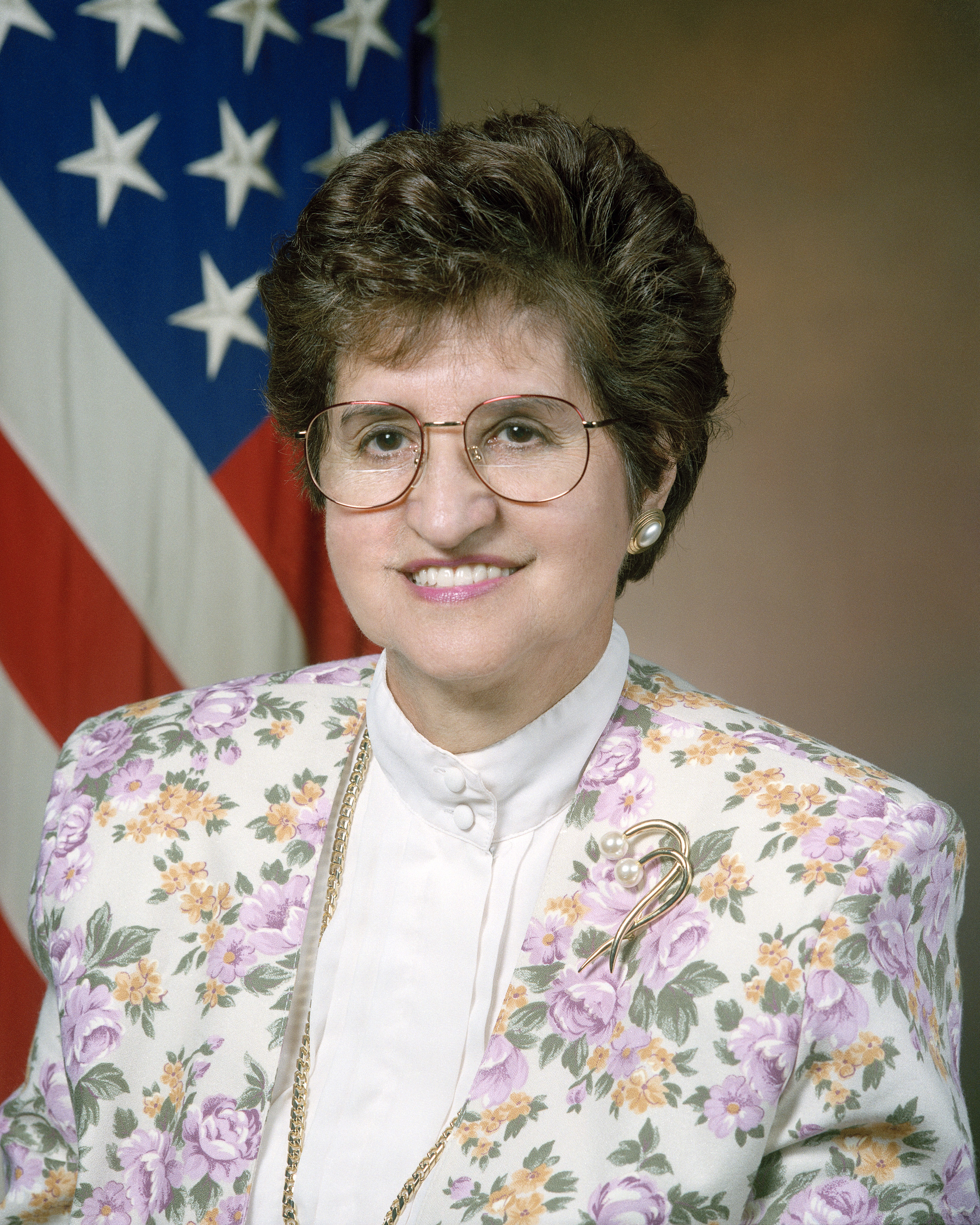
- Mari-Luci Jaramillo in September 1993

United States Ambassador to Honduras
- In office October 27, 1977 – September 19, 1980
- President: Jimmy Carter
- Preceded by: Ralph Elihu Becker
- Succeeded by: Jack R. Binns

Personal details
- Born: Mari-Luci Antuna; June 19, 1928 Las Vegas, New Mexico, U.S.
- Died: November 20, 2019 (aged 91) Albuquerque, New Mexico, U.S.
- Education: New Mexico Highlands University (BA, MEd); University of New Mexico (PhD)

Mari-Luci Jaramillo (June 19, 1928 – November 20, 2019) was an American educator and diplomat who served as U.S. Ambassador to Honduras from 1977 to 1980. Upon her confirmation, Jaramillo became the first Mexican-American woman to serve as an American ambassador.

== Early life and education ==
Jaramillo was native of Las Vegas, New Mexico. While attending school, she worked in her father's shop, shining shoes. Later, she cleaned houses and waited tables in order to help pay for her tuition at New Mexico Highlands University. In 1959, she graduated magna cum laude from Highlands University with a master's degree in education. In 1970, she earned a doctorate from the University of New Mexico. Her doctoral thesis was entitled In-service teacher education in a tri-ethnic community: a participant-observer study.

== Career ==
After graduation, she became an elementary school teacher. Later Jaramillo joined the faculty at the University of New Mexico and served in various roles, including associate dean, vice president, and assistant to the president of the university.

On April 1, 1977, President Carter asked Jaramillo to become the United States Ambassador to Honduras. She served as ambassador from 1977 to 1980. While serving as ambassador, Jaramillo oversaw the Peace Corps program in Honduras.

Since her ambassadorship, Jaramillo has worked for Educational Testing Service and spent several years at The Pentagon. She has also served on the board of trustees of the Children's Television Workshop and the Diversity External Advisory Council of the Los Alamos National Laboratory. Jaramillo was later a member of the National Association of Latino Elected and Appointed Officials.

In 1992, Jaramillo was appointed deputy Assistant Secretary of Defense for Latin America during the Clinton Administration.

== Personal life ==
Jaramillo's first marriage to Horacio Ulibarrí ended in divorce after the couple had two sons and a daughter. Her second husband was Heriberto Jaramillo and her third husband was James Elliott.

Jaramillo died in Albuquerque, New Mexico on November 20, 2019. She was 91.

== Works ==
- Jaramiilo, Mari-Luci (1972). Cautions When Working with the Culturally Different Child. OCLC 95564950.
- Jaramillo, Mari-Luci (2002). Madam Ambassador: The Shoemaker's Daughter. Tempe, Arizona: Bilingual Press. ISBN 1-931010-04-8. OCLC 45917194.
- Jaramillo, Mari-Luci (2019). Sacred Seeds: a Girl, her Abuelos, and the Heart of Northern New Mexico. Taos, NM.: Barranca Press. ISBN 9-7819-39604-34-7. OCLC 1128295966.

Diplomatic posts
| Preceded by Ralph E. Becker | United States Ambassador to Honduras; 1977 – 1980 | Succeeded by Jack R. Binns |
