= Langhorne A. Motley =

American diplomat

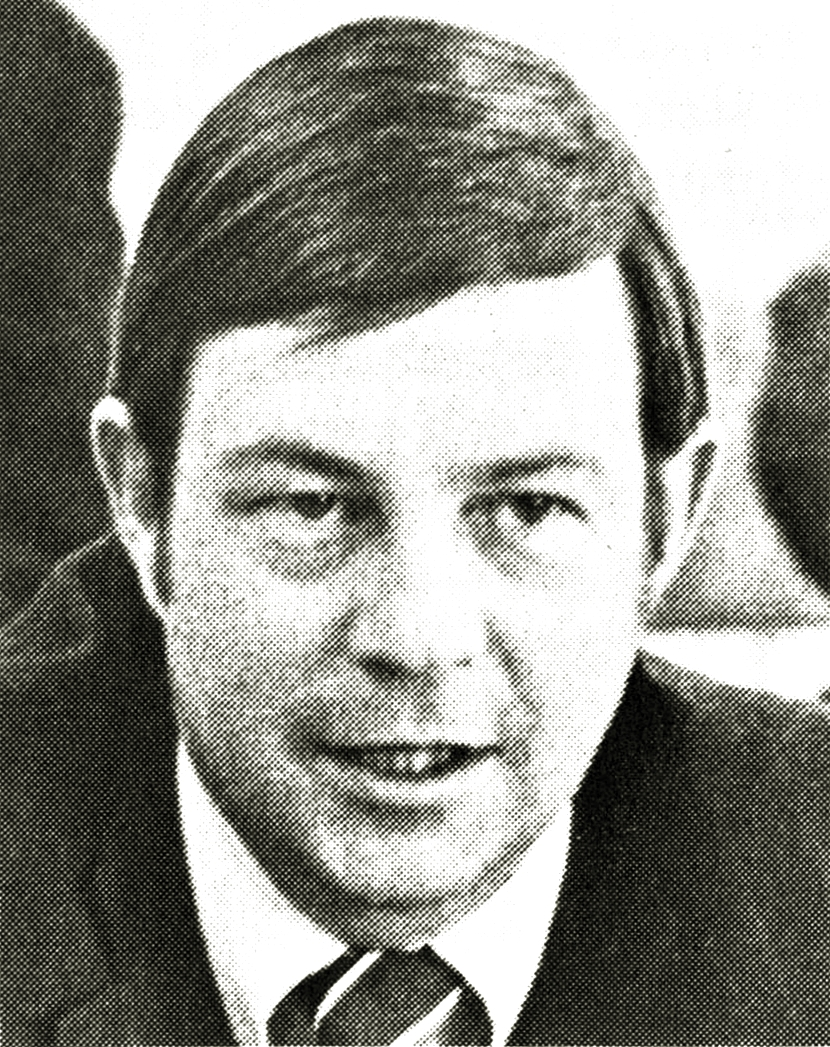
- Motley in 1975 as Commissioner for Alaska Department of Commerce, Community and Economic Development

22nd Assistant Secretary of State for Inter-American Affairs
- In office July 6, 1983 – July 17, 1985
- President: Ronald Reagan
- Secretary: George Shultz
- Preceded by: Thomas O. Enders
- Succeeded by: Elliott Abrams

United States Ambassador to Brazil
- In office October 6, 1981 – July 6, 1983
- President: Ronald Reagan
- Preceded by: Robert M. Sayre
- Succeeded by: Diego C. Asencio

Personal details
- Born: Langhorne Anthony Motley; June 5, 1938 Rio de Janeiro, Brazil
- Died: October 14, 2023 (aged 85) Stuart, Florida
- Party: Republican
- Education: The Citadel, The Military College of South Carolina

Military service
- Allegiance: United States
- Branch/service: United States Air Force
- Years of service: 1960–1970

Langhorne Anthony "Tony" Motley (June 5, 1938 – October 14, 2023) was a former United States Ambassador to Brazil (1981–83) and Assistant Secretary of State for Western Hemisphere Affairs (1983–85). He was a member of the American Academy of Diplomacy and Council on Foreign Relations. Ambassador Motley had a wife and two children. He received his Bachelor of Arts from The Citadel in 1960.

== Early life ==
Motley was born in Rio de Janeiro, Brazil. Time Magazine described Langhorne A. Motley as "The son of an American oil executive and a British-Brazilian mother, he was born and grew up amid sun-splashed privilege in Rio de Janeiro. After graduating from The Citadel in Charleston, S.C., Motley joined the Air Force and was posted from 1965 to 1967 in Panama—his only Central American experience—and later in Alaska. There he switched careers and founded what has since become the largest real estate firm in the state."

== Professional experience ==
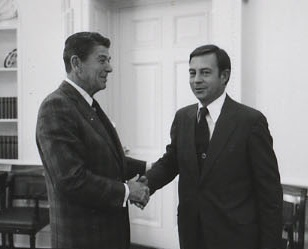
Motley meeting with Ronald Reagan on the occasion of his appointment as ambassador, September 24, 1981.

Military service: USAF (1960–70) US Assistant Secretary of State for Western Hemisphere Affairs (1983–85) US Ambassador to Brazil (1981–83) Valeria, Inc. President (1980–81) Citizens for the Management of Alaska Lands, Inc. EVP (1977–80) Alaska State Official Commissioner of Commerce and Economic Development (1975–77) RODMAR, Inc. VP (-1974) Crescent Realty, Inc. President (c. 1972) Area Realtors, Inc. (Anchorage) VP (1970-) American Academy of Diplomacy Bayou Leader PAC Bush Cheney '04 Council on Foreign Relations George W. Bush for President Board of Telos Corporation (2004–2006) John McCain 2008 Junior Achievement Board of Directors

== Quotes ==
1. According to a Foreign Policy Article "The Art of Leaking" published January 20, 2010, "An assistant secretary of state, Langhorne A. Motley, once defined a leak as a "premature unauthorized partial disclosure."
2. According to a news item on the St. John's University Website "Ambassador Motley then discussed his experiences working with Latin America and some general principals of U.S. relations with Latin America in general, as well as specific countries. He also emphasized the importance and relevance of our country's foreign policy towards Latin American nations. "Up through World War II, you could separate foreign policy from domestic policy," said Ambassador Motley. "This is no longer true. Today many issues at the center of Latin American policy are also domestic issues."

Diplomatic posts
Preceded by Robert M. Sayre	United States Ambassador to Brazil; 1981–1983	Succeeded by Diego C. Asencio
Government offices
Preceded by Thomas O. Enders	Assistant Secretary of State for Inter-American Affairs; July 12, 1983 – July 3, 1985	Succeeded by Elliott Abrams
