= List of ambassadors of the United States to Honduras =

Ambassador of the United States to Honduras
- Seal of the United States Department of State

- Flag of a United States ambassador

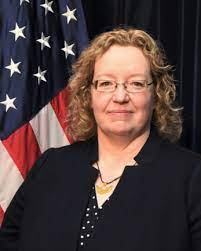
- Incumbent; Colleen A. Hoey; Chargé d'affaires ad interim since June 23, 2025
- Nominator: The president of the United States
- Appointer: The president with Senate advice and consent
- Inaugural holder: Solon Borland as Envoy Extraordinary and Minister Plenipotentiary
- Formation: 1850s
- Website: U.S. Embassy - Tegucigalpa

The following is a list of United States ambassadors, or other chiefs of mission, to Honduras. The title given by the United States State Department to this position is currently Ambassador Extraordinary and Plenipotentiary.

== Ambassadors ==
Representative	Title	Presentation of credentials	Termination of mission	Appointed by
Solon Borland	Envoy Extraordinary and Minister Plenipotentiary		April 17, 1854	Franklin Pierce
Beverly L. Clarke	Minister Resident	August 10, 1858	March 17, 1860	James Buchanan
James R. Partridge	Minister Resident	April 25, 1862	November 14, 1862	Abraham Lincoln
Thomas H. Clay	Minister Resident	April 5, 1864	August 10, 1866	Abraham Lincoln
Richard H. Rousseau	Minister Resident	October 10, 1866	August 10, 1869	Andrew Johnson
Henry Baxter	Minister Resident	August 10, 1869	June 30, 1873	Ulysses S. Grant
George Williamson	Minister Resident	February 19, 1874	January 31, 1879	Ulysses S. Grant
Cornelius A. Logan	Minister Resident	October 10, 1879	April 15, 1882	Rutherford B. Hayes
Henry C. Hall	Minister Resident	April 21, 1882	September 26, 1882	Chester A. Arthur
Henry C. Hall	Envoy Extraordinary and Minister Plenipotentiary	September 26, 1882	May 16, 1889	Chester A. Arthur
Lansing B. Mizner	Envoy Extraordinary and Minister Plenipotentiary	March 30, 1889	December 31, 1890	Benjamin Harrison
Romualdo Pacheco	Envoy Extraordinary and Minister Plenipotentiary	April 17, 1891	June 12, 1893	Benjamin Harrison
Pierce M. B. Young	Envoy Extraordinary and Minister Plenipotentiary	November 12, 1893	May 23, 1896	Grover Cleveland
Macgrane Coxe	Envoy Extraordinary and Minister Plenipotentiary		June 30, 1897	Grover Cleveland
W. Godfrey Hunter	Envoy Extraordinary and Minister Plenipotentiary	January 19, 1899	February 2, 1903	William McKinley
Leslie Combs	Envoy Extraordinary and Minister Plenipotentiary	May 22, 1903	February 27, 1907	Theodore Roosevelt
Joseph W. J. Lee	Envoy Extraordinary and Minister Plenipotentiary		July 1, 1907	Theodore Roosevelt
Henry Percival Dodge	Envoy Extraordinary and Minister Plenipotentiary	June 17, 1908	February 6, 1909	Theodore Roosevelt
Philip Marshall Brown	Envoy Extraordinary and Minister Plenipotentiary	February 21, 1909	February 26, 1910	Theodore Roosevelt
Fenton R. McCreery	Envoy Extraordinary and Minister Plenipotentiary	March 10, 1910	July 2, 1911	William H. Taft
Charles Dunning White	Envoy Extraordinary and Minister Plenipotentiary	September 9, 1911	November 4, 1913	William H. Taft
John Ewing	Envoy Extraordinary and Minister Plenipotentiary	December 26, 1913	January 18, 1918	Woodrow Wilson
T. Sambola Jones	Envoy Extraordinary and Minister Plenipotentiary	October 2, 1918	October 17, 1919	Woodrow Wilson
Franklin E. Morales	Envoy Extraordinary and Minister Plenipotentiary	January 18, 1922	March 2, 1925	Warren G. Harding
George T. Summerlin	Envoy Extraordinary and Minister Plenipotentiary	November 21, 1925	December 17, 1929	Calvin Coolidge
Julius Gareché Lay	Envoy Extraordinary and Minister Plenipotentiary	May 31, 1930	March 17, 1935	Herbert Hoover
Leo J. Keena	Envoy Extraordinary and Minister Plenipotentiary	July 19, 1935	May 1, 1937	Franklin D. Roosevelt
John Draper Erwin	Envoy Extraordinary and Minister Plenipotentiary	September 8, 1937	April 27, 1943	Franklin D. Roosevelt
John Draper Erwin	Ambassador Extraordinary and Plenipotentiary	April 27, 1943	April 16, 1947	Franklin D. Roosevelt
Paul C. Daniels	Ambassador Extraordinary and Plenipotentiary	June 23, 1947	October 30, 1947	Harry S. Truman
Herbert S. Bursley	Ambassador Extraordinary and Plenipotentiary	May 15, 1948	December 12, 1950	Harry S. Truman
John Draper Erwin	Ambassador Extraordinary and Plenipotentiary	March 14, 1951	February 28, 1954	Harry S. Truman
Whiting Willauer	Ambassador Extraordinary and Plenipotentiary	March 5, 1954	March 24, 1958	Dwight D. Eisenhower
Robert Newbegin	Ambassador Extraordinary and Plenipotentiary	April 30, 1958	August 3, 1960	Dwight D. Eisenhower
Charles R. Burrows	Ambassador Extraordinary and Plenipotentiary	November 3, 1960	June 28, 1965	Dwight D. Eisenhower
Joseph J. Jova	Ambassador Extraordinary and Plenipotentiary	July 12, 1965	June 21, 1969	Lyndon B. Johnson
Hewson A. Ryan	Ambassador Extraordinary and Plenipotentiary	November 5, 1969	May 30, 1973	Richard Nixon
Phillip V. Sanchez	Ambassador Extraordinary and Plenipotentiary	June 15, 1973	July 17, 1976	Richard Nixon
Ralph E. Becker	Ambassador Extraordinary and Plenipotentiary	October 27, 1976	August 1, 1977	Gerald Ford
Mari-Luci Jaramillo	Ambassador Extraordinary and Plenipotentiary	October 27, 1977	September 19, 1980	Jimmy Carter
Jack R. Binns	Ambassador Extraordinary and Plenipotentiary	October 10, 1980	October 31, 1981	Jimmy Carter
John D. Negroponte	Ambassador Extraordinary and Plenipotentiary	November 11, 1981	May 30, 1985	Ronald Reagan
John Arthur Ferch	Ambassador Extraordinary and Plenipotentiary	August 22, 1985	July 9, 1986	Ronald Reagan
Everett Ellis Briggs	Ambassador Extraordinary and Plenipotentiary	November 4, 1986	June 15, 1989	Ronald Reagan
Cresencio S. Arcos, Jr.	Ambassador Extraordinary and Plenipotentiary	January 29, 1990	July 1, 1993	George H. W. Bush
William Thornton Pryce	Ambassador Extraordinary and Plenipotentiary	July 21, 1993	August 15, 1996	Bill Clinton
James F. Creagan	Ambassador Extraordinary and Plenipotentiary	August 29, 1996	July 20, 1999	Bill Clinton
Frank Almaguer	Ambassador Extraordinary and Plenipotentiary	August 25, 1999	September 5, 2002	Bill Clinton
Larry Leon Palmer	Ambassador Extraordinary and Plenipotentiary	October 8, 2002	May 7, 2005	George W. Bush
Charles A. Ford	Ambassador Extraordinary and Plenipotentiary	November 8, 2005	March 18, 2008	George W. Bush
Hugo Llorens	Ambassador Extraordinary and Plenipotentiary	September 19, 2008	July 3, 2011	George W. Bush
Lisa Kubiske	Ambassador Extraordinary and Plenipotentiary	July 26, 2011	August 2, 2014	Barack Obama
James D. Nealon	Ambassador Extraordinary and Plenipotentiary	August 21, 2014	June 11, 2017	Barack Obama
Heide B. Fulton	Chargé d'Affaires ad interim	June 11, 2017	August 30, 2019	Donald Trump
Colleen A. Hoey	Chargé d'Affaires ad interim	August 30, 2019	April 7, 2022	Donald Trump
Laura Farnsworth Dogu	Ambassador Extraordinary and Plenipotentiary	April 12, 2022	April 18, 2025	Joe Biden
Roy Perrin	Chargé d'Affaires ad interim	April 18, 2025	June 6, 2025	Donald Trump
Lyra Carr	Chargé d'Affaires ad interim	June 6, 2025	June 23, 2025	Donald Trump
Colleen A. Hoey	Chargé d'Affaires ad interim	June 23, 2025	Present	Donald Trump

== See also ==
- Honduras – United States relations
- Foreign relations of Honduras
- Ambassadors of the United States
