= Cresencio S. Arcos Jr. =

American diplomat

17th United States Ambassador to Honduras
- In office January 29, 1990 – July 1, 1993
- President: George H. W. Bush; Bill Clinton
- Preceded by: Everett Ellis Briggs
- Succeeded by: William Thornton Pryce

Personal details
- Born: November 10, 1943 (age 82) San Antonio, Texas
- Education: University of Texas (BA); School of Advanced International Studies (MA)

Military service
- Allegiance: United States
- Branch/service: United States Army
- Years of service: 1968-1970

Cresencio "Cris" S. Arcos Jr. (born November 10, 1943) is an American diplomat.

== Biography ==
Arcos is a consultant and Senior Advisor to the Center for Hemispheric Defense Studies at the National Defense University. Previously, he was Government Affairs Counselor at Kirkpatrick Lockhart and Preston Gates LLP. He was Assistant Secretary for International Affairs at the U.S. Department of Homeland Security (2003–2006). Prior to this he was the AT&T Corporation’s Vice President and managing director for International Public Affairs for Latin America and Canada (1995–2002) for market access, regulatory framework, business development and fair competition. His last position was Senior Deputy Assistant Secretary of State for International Narcotics and Law Enforcement, 1993–1995. He served as U.S. Ambassador to Honduras, 1989–93. Prior to this posting, he was Deputy Assistant Secretary of State for Inter-American Affairs, 1988–89. In 1993, he also served on the Department of State's North American Free Trade Agreement (NAFTA) Task Force.

From 1986 to 1988, Arcos served as The White House Coordinator for Public Diplomacy on Central America and was the Deputy Coordinator in the Office of Public Diplomacy for Latin America at the Department of State. From 1985 to 1986, he served as the State Department's Deputy Director of the Nicaraguan Humanitarian Assistance Office. His Foreign Service postings abroad included: Belgium, Portugal, Brazil, Soviet Union (Russia) and Honduras.

He has a B.A. from the University of Texas at Austin and an M.A. from Johns Hopkins University’s Paul H. Nitze School of Advanced International Studies.

He is a member of: the Council on Foreign Relations, New York; The Atlantic Council, Washington; Director, Council of the Americas, New York (1995–2002); U.S. Member, U.N. Drug Control Program Advisory Board, Vienna (1994–1997); Advisory Commission, Florida International University’s Latin America-Caribbean Center (1996–2002); Diplomatic and Retired Consular Officers Association (DACOR); American Foreign Service Association; Board, United Negro College Fund’s Institute of International Public Policy 1995–2003); Board of Visitors, Pan American (Zamorano) Agriculture School, Honduras (1996–2003); Board, Save the Children, Latin America (1997–2000); Board, Foster Care Review, Florida (1998–2002); Pacific Council on International Policy, Los Angeles; Board, Pan American Development Foundation, Washington (2000–2003); Member, The Inter-American Dialogue, Washington (1998–2003); Member, ex officio, Department of Defense Reserved Forces Policy Board (2003–2005); Senior Advisor, The Center for the Study of the Presidency (2006–present), American Academy of Diplomacy (2010–present); Advisory Board Member of United Against Nuclear Iran; Advisory Board Member of the Counter Extremism Project.

Diplomatic posts
Preceded by Everett Ellis Briggs	United States Ambassador to Honduras; 1990 – 1993	Succeeded by William Thornton Pryce
