= Roger F. Nyhus =

American businessman

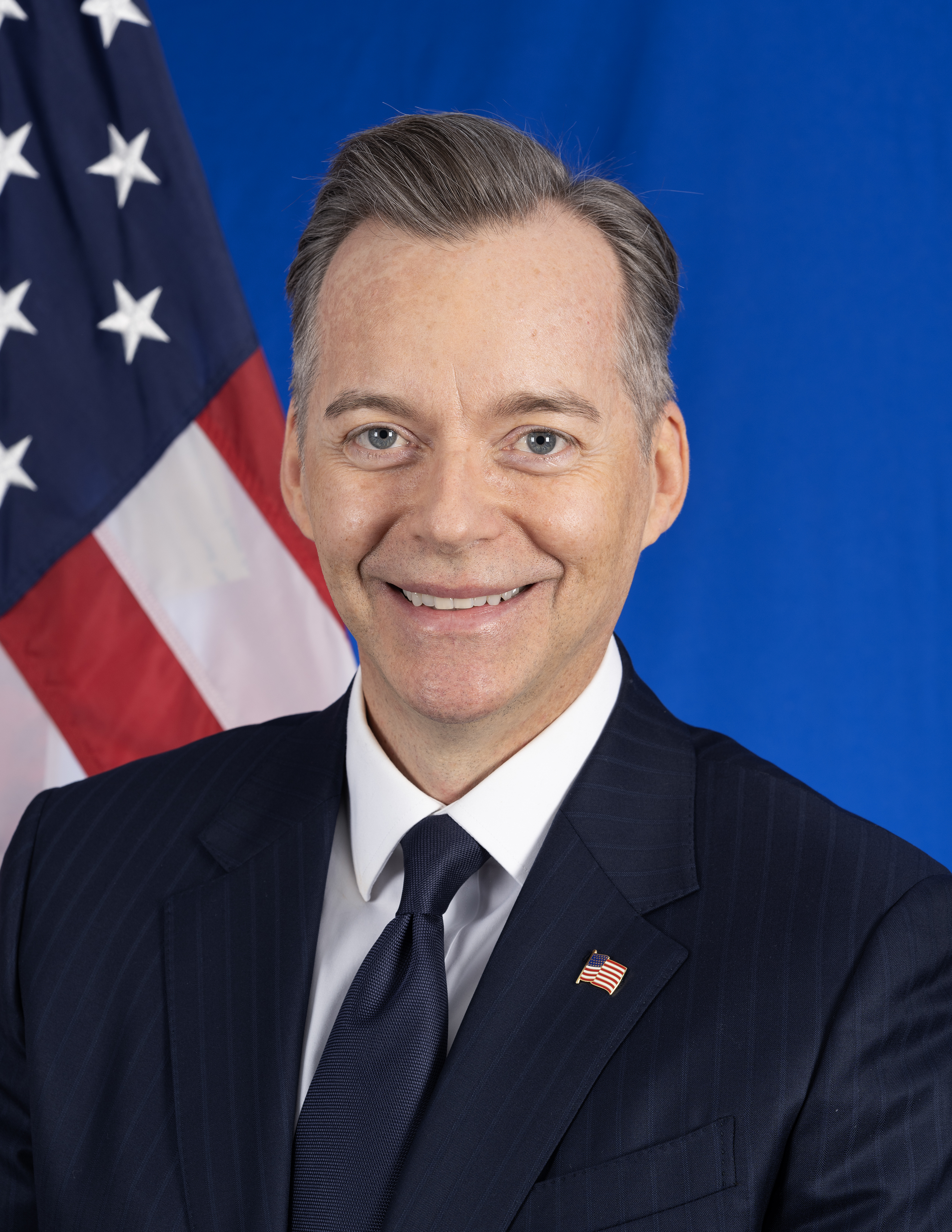

United States Ambassador to Barbados
- In office January 19, 2024 – January 20, 2025
- President: Joe Biden
- Preceded by: Linda Swartz Taglialatela
- Succeeded by: Karin B. Sullivan (Acting)

United States Ambassador to Saint Lucia
- In office January 31, 2024 – January 20, 2025
- President: Joe Biden
- Preceded by: Linda Swartz Taglialatela
- Succeeded by: Karin B. Sullivan (Acting)

12th United States Ambassador to Antigua and Barbuda
- In office February 2, 2024 – January 20, 2025
- President: Joe Biden
- Preceded by: Linda Swartz Taglialatela
- Succeeded by: Karin B. Sullivan (Acting)

United States Ambassador to Grenada
- In office February 6, 2024 – January 20, 2025
- President: Joe Biden
- Preceded by: Linda Swartz Taglialatela
- Succeeded by: Karin B. Sullivan (Acting)

United States Ambassador to Saint Vincent and the Grenadines
- In office February 9, 2024 – January 20, 2025
- President: Joe Biden
- Preceded by: Linda Swartz Taglialatela
- Succeeded by: Karin B. Sullivan (Acting)

United States Ambassador to Saint Kitts and Nevis
- In office February 14, 2024 – January 20, 2025
- President: Joe Biden
- Preceded by: Linda Swartz Taglialatela
- Succeeded by: Karin B. Sullivan (Acting)

United States Ambassador to Dominica
- In office February 26, 2024 – January 20, 2025
- President: Joe Biden
- Preceded by: Linda Swartz Taglialatela
- Succeeded by: Karin B. Sullivan (Acting)

Personal details
- Education: Washington State University (BA)

Roger F. Nyhus is an American business and civic leader who had served as the United States ambassador to Barbados, the Eastern Caribbean and the OECS.

== Early life and education ==
Nyhus was born in the fishing village of Westport, Washington. His father was a commercial fisherman and municipal court clerk. He is a member of the Chinook Indian Nation.

He earned his bachelor's degree from the Edward R. Murrow College of Communication at Washington State University.

== Career ==
Nyhus is the founder and former CEO of Nyhus Communications, a communications and public affairs firm based in Seattle, Washington, the eighth largest Native American-owned company in the state of Washington.

He has participated in international trade missions to China, Ireland, Cuba, and the United Arab Emirates. Nyhus has also served as a trusted adviser to business, government, and nonprofit leaders worldwide, including CEOs of Fortune 500 companies. During his career, Nyhus served as the Communications Director for Washington Governor Gary Locke, a Senior Advocacy Officer for the Bill and Melinda Gates Foundation, and Communications Director for Seattle Mayor Paul Schell. He also served on the boards of the Seattle Metropolitan Chamber of Commerce and Downtown Seattle Association.

During the leadup to the 2020 presidential election, Biden made a campaign stop at Nyhus' home in Washington state.

=== U.S. ambassador to Barbados and the Eastern Caribbean ===
On September 20, 2022, President Joe Biden nominated Nyhus to be the ambassador to Barbados, while also serving as the ambassador to Saint Kitts and Nevis, Saint Lucia, Antigua and Barbuda, Dominica, Grenada, and Saint Vincent and the Grenadines. His nomination was returned to Biden at the end of the Congress on January 3, 2023, as no action was taken on it.

President Biden renominated Nyhus the same day. Hearings on his nomination were held before the Senate Foreign Relations Committee on May 4, 2023. The committee favorably reported his nomination on June 1, 2023. On November 15, 2023, the Senate confirmed Nyhus by a voice vote. He presented his credentials to President of Barbados Sandra Mason on January 19, 2024.

During his time as ambassador, Nyhus created a U.S. partnership to improve court system efficiency in Barbados, promoted U.S. business investment in the region, and, along with Interior Secretary Deb Haaland partnered with Eastern Caribbean nations to help combat climate change.

=== U.S. ambassador to St. Lucia ===
Nyhus presented his credentials to Governor General Errol Charles on January 31, 2024.

=== U.S. ambassador to Antigua and Barbuda ===
Nyhus presented his credentials to Governor General Sir Rodney Williams on February 2, 2024.

=== U.S. ambassador to Grenada ===
Nyhus presented his credentials to Governor General Cécile La Grenade on February 6, 2024.

=== U.S. ambassador to Saint Vincent and the Grenadines ===
Nyhus presented his credentials to Governor General Susan Dougan on February 9, 2024.

=== U.S. ambassador to Saint Kitts and Nevis ===
Nyhus presented his credentials to Governor General Marcella Liburd on February 14, 2024.

=== U.S. ambassador to Dominica ===
Nyhus presented his credentials to President Sylvanie Burton on February 26, 2024.

=== Return to private sector ===
Following his tenure as ambassador, Nyhus launched AMBO Strategy, a strategic communications consultancy, in 2025.

== Awards and recognitions ==
In February 2023, Washington State University announced Nyhus would be inducted into Murrow College's Hall of Achievement.

Diplomatic posts
Preceded by Linda Swartz Taglialatela
Preceded by Linda Swartz Taglialatela	United States Ambassador to Barbados; 2024–2025	Vacant
Preceded by Linda Swartz Taglialatela	United States Ambassador to Saint Lucia; 2024–2025	Vacant
Preceded by Linda Swartz Taglialatela	United States Ambassador to Dominica; 2024–2025	Vacant
Preceded by Linda Swartz Taglialatela	United States Ambassador to Saint Vincent and the Grenadines; 2024–2025	Vacant
Preceded by Linda Swartz Taglialatela	United States Ambassador to Antigua and Barbuda; 2024–2025	Vacant
Preceded by Linda Swartz Taglialatela	United States Ambassador to Saint Kitts and Nevis; 2024–2025	Vacant
Preceded by Linda Swartz Taglialatela	United States Ambassador to Grenada; 2024–2025	Vacant
Preceded by Linda Swartz Taglialatela	Special Representative to the Organisation of Eastern Caribbean States; 2024–2025	Vacant
