= Franklin E. Morales =

American businessman and diplomat (1884-1962)

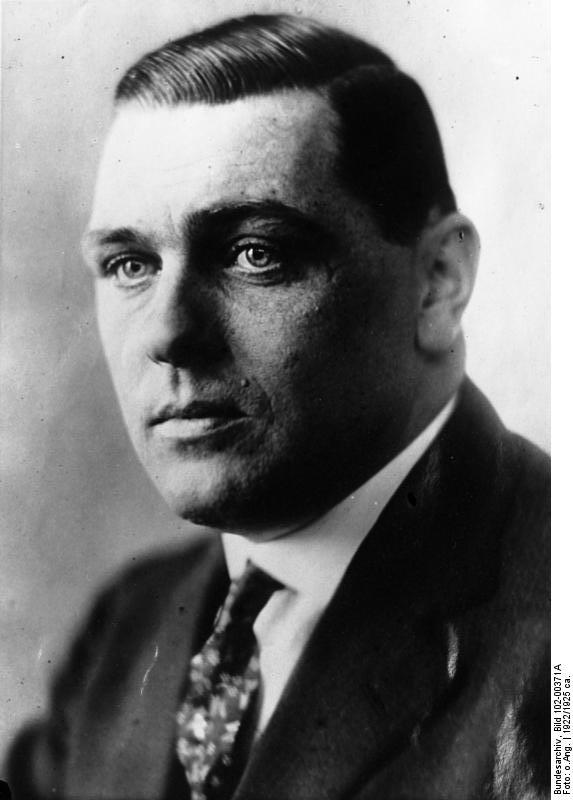
Franklin E. Morales

Franklin E. Morales (January 26, 1884 – July 1962) was an American businessman and diplomat.

He was born in Philadelphia and attended public schools. After attending business school and studying law, he became a Central American representative for Internations Commercial Corporation. He served as the company's vice president from 1919 through 1920. He then became a representative of manufacturing jewelers in South America until he was appointed by Warren Harding as Envoy Extraordinary and Minister Plenipotentiary to Honduras on October 24, 1921. He served from January 18, 1922 – March 2, 1925.

Diplomatic posts
Preceded by George T. Summerlin	United States Ambassador to Honduras; January 18, 1922 – March 2, 1925	Succeeded by T. Sambola Jones
