= Frank Almaguer =

American diplomat

United States Ambassador to Honduras
- In office July 7, 1999 – September 5, 2002
- President: Bill Clinton; George W. Bush
- Preceded by: James F. Creagan
- Succeeded by: Larry Leon Palmer

Personal details
- Born: 1945 (age 80–81) Holguin, Cuba
- Spouse: Antoinette Gallegos
- Education: University of Florida (B.A.); George Washington University (M.S.)
- Profession: Diplomat

Frank Almaguer (born 1945) is an American retired diplomat and career Foreign Service Officer. He has served in numerous positions with the Peace Corps, the United States Agency for International Development, the U.S. Department of State and the Organization of American States.

== Background ==
Almaguer was born in Holguin, Cuba and grew up in Miami, Florida. He earned a Bachelor of Arts in political science from the University of Florida in 1967 and a Master of Science in government administration from the George Washington University in 1974.

== Career ==
Almaguer served in the Peace Corps as a volunteer in Orange Walk Town, Belize from 1967 to 1969, as Associate PC Belize Country Director from 1974 to 1976, and as PC Country Director in Honduras from 1976 to 1979.

From 1979 to 1983, Almaguer served as Deputy Mission Director for the United States Agency for International Development (USAID) in Panama. From 1983 to 1986, Almaguer worked for USAID in Washington, D.C. as Director of the Office of South American and Mexican Affairs. From 1986 to 1990, he served as USAID Mission Director in Ecuador. During the 1990-91 academic year, Almaguer participated in the U.S. State Department's Senior Seminar Program overseen by the U.S. Foreign Service Institute. From 1991 to 1993, Almaguer served as USAID's Regional Mission Director for Eastern Europe, based in Washington. From 1993 to 1996, he served as USAID Deputy Assistant Administrator for Human Resources and Director of Personnel in Washington. From 1996 to 1999, he served as USAID Mission Director in Bolivia.

In 1999, Almaguer was nominated by President Bill Clinton and confirmed by the U.S. Senate to serve as United States Ambassador to Honduras, where he served from August 1999 to September 2002.

Almaguer retired from the United States Foreign Service with the personal rank of Career Minister in November 2002. From 2003 to 2005, Almaguer served as a Senior Adviser to the Pan American Development Foundation, was a United States Delegate to the 60th annual meeting of the United Nations Commission on Human Rights, and worked as an international consultant on economic and social development reforms.

Almaguer was appointed as Secretary for Administration and Finance at the Organization of American States, the third-ranking position at the OAS, in February 2005, where he served for almost six years. He retired from the OAS position in December 2010. Since retiring from the OAS, Almaguer has served on a number of Boards: He has served since 2012 on the Board of Trustees of the Pan American Agricultural University (aka, Zamorano), serving students from throughout the Americas. He also has served on the Board of the USAID Alumni Association (2012-2016). In 2016, Almaguer was appointed by U.S. Secretary of State John Kerry to serve on the Foreign Service Grievance Board (FSGB), a position to which he was reappointed by Secretary of State Mike Pompeo in 2018. In 2017, Almaguer was elected as a member of the American Academy of Diplomacy.

== Personal life ==
Almaguer is married to Antoinette Almaguer (née Gallegos), a native of Albuquerque, New Mexico. They have two adult children and four grandchildren. Almaguer and his wife live in Vienna, Virginia.

== See also ==
- Tom Dine
- John Barsa
- Anupama Rajaraman
- Pop Buell
- Atul Gawande

Diplomatic posts
Preceded by James F. Creagan	United States Ambassador to Honduras; 1999–2002	Succeeded by Larry L. Palmer
