= Phillip V. Sanchez =

American diplomat (1929–2017)

Phillip Sánchez

United States Ambassador to Honduras
- In office June 15, 1973 – July 17, 1976
- President: Richard Nixon
- Preceded by: Hewson A. Ryan
- Succeeded by: Ralph Elihu Becker

United States Ambassador to Colombia
- In office September 2, 1976 – April 5, 1977
- President: Gerald Ford
- Preceded by: Viron P. Vaky
- Succeeded by: Diego C. Asencio

5th Director of the Office of Economic Opportunity
- In office January 1972 – 1973
- President: Richard Nixon
- Preceded by: Frank Carlucci
- Succeeded by: Alvin J. Arnett

Personal details
- Born: July 28, 1929 Pinedale, California, U.S.
- Died: October 16, 2017 (aged 88) Fresno, California, U.S.
- Spouse: Juanita
- Profession: Diplomat

Phillip Victor Sánchez (July 28, 1929 – October 16, 2017) was an American diplomat. He served as United States Ambassador to Honduras under President Richard Nixon and United States Ambassador to Colombia under President Gerald Ford.

From 1987 he was the publisher of the newspaper Noticias del Mundo. He became president of CAUSA USA, an anti-communist educational organization associated with the Unification Church, and was on the Advisory Board of the University of Bridgeport in Connecticut. He received a Distinguished Alumnus Award in 1975 from the American Association of State Colleges and Universities (AASCU).

Diplomatic posts
Preceded by Hewson A. Ryan	United States Ambassador to Honduras; 1973–1976	Succeeded by Ralph E. Becker
Preceded by Viron P. Vaky	United States Ambassador to Colombia; 1976–1977	Succeeded by Diego C. Asencio
