= Four Power Naval Commission =

The Four Power Naval Commission was created after World War II by the United States, France, Great Britain and the Soviet Union to dispose of elements of the Italian Fleet, and to provide for the return of warships the US and UK had loaned to the Soviet Union during the war. It was established by a Protocol signed at Paris on February 10, 1947, at the same time as the Treaty of Peace with Italy, whose Article 57 provided a mandate for the Commission. The Commission was constituted and began work on February 11. Among the issues it dealt with was Soviet reluctance to return warships to United States and the UK before it received "full clarity" regarding Italian warships it expected to receive. By Spring of 1949, a number of issues had been resolved and Captain R.F. Pryce, the U.S. representative, proposed that the Commission disband in early May, it appearing that remaining issues could be resolved through diplomatic channels.

== See also ==
- Four Power (disambiguation)
- Four Power Agreement on Berlin
- Council of Foreign Ministers
- European Advisory Commission
- Treaty on the Final Settlement With Respect to Germany
- History of Germany since 1945
