= New Jersey v. New York =

1998 U.S. Supreme Court case

- Supreme Court of the United States

Original jurisdiction Argued January 12, 1998 Decided May 26, 1998
- Full case name: State of New Jersey v. State of New York
- Citations: 523 U.S. 767 (more) 118 S. Ct. 1726; 140 L. Ed. 2d 993; 1998 U.S. LEXIS 3405; 66 U.S.L.W. 4389; 98 Daily Journal DAR 5406; 1998 Colo. J. C.A.R. 2596; 11 Fla. L. Weekly Fed. S 563
- Argument: Oral argument

Outcome
- New Jersey has sovereign authority over the filled land added to the original Ellis Island. New Jersey's exception to that portion of the Special Master's report concerning the Court's authority to adjust the original boundary line between the two States is sustained. The other exceptions of New Jersey and New York are overruled.

Court membership
- Chief Justice William Rehnquist Associate Justices John P. Stevens · Sandra Day O'Connor; Antonin Scalia · Anthony Kennedy; David Souter · Clarence Thomas; Ruth Bader Ginsburg · Stephen Breyer

Case opinions
- Majority: Souter, joined by Rehnquist, O'Connor, Kennedy, Ginsburg, Breyer
- Concurrence: Breyer, joined by Ginsburg
- Dissent: Stevens
- Dissent: Scalia, joined by Thomas

Laws applied
- 1834 Compact between New York and New Jersey

New Jersey v. New York, 523 U.S. 767 (1998), was a U.S. Supreme Court case that determined that roughly 83% of Ellis Island was part of New Jersey, rather than New York State.

Because the New Jersey original 1664 land grant was unclear, the states of New Jersey and New York disputed ownership and jurisdiction over the Hudson River and its islands. The two states entered into a compact ratified by Congress in 1834, which set a boundary line to be the middle of the Hudson River, but giving all islands in the river (including Ellis Island) to New York. From 1890 to 1934, the federal government expanded Ellis Island through land reclamation to accommodate its immigration station. Starting in the 1980s, New Jersey contended that these newer portions of the Ellis Island were part of New Jersey. New Jersey filed suit in 1997.

In a 6–3 decision, the Supreme Court ruled that because the 1834 compact gave New Jersey jurisdiction over submerged land around Ellis Island, the newer reclaimed land was in New Jersey, not New York. While the ruling changed little in practice (Ellis Island is federal land), it did affect the allocation of sales tax revenue and future development plans for the island.

== History ==
After the British takeover of New Netherland in 1664, the Province of New Jersey was founded as a separate entity from the Province of New York. An unusual clause in New Jersey's colonial land grant named the territory as being "westward of Long Island, and Manhitas Island and bounded on the east part by the main sea, and part by Hudson's river," rather than at the river's midpoint, as was common in other colonial charters.

The boundary between the states of New York and New Jersey remained disputed around the Hudson River. The states convened conferences as early as 1807 to resolve the state line but did not reach agreement. In 1831, New Jersey sued New York in the Supreme Court over the dispute, but dropped the case in 1836. Instead, the two states negotiated a compact in 1833, ratified by the US Congress in 1834. Among other agreements, the compact established that New York owned Ellis Island, but New Jersey owned the submerged lands around Ellis Island.

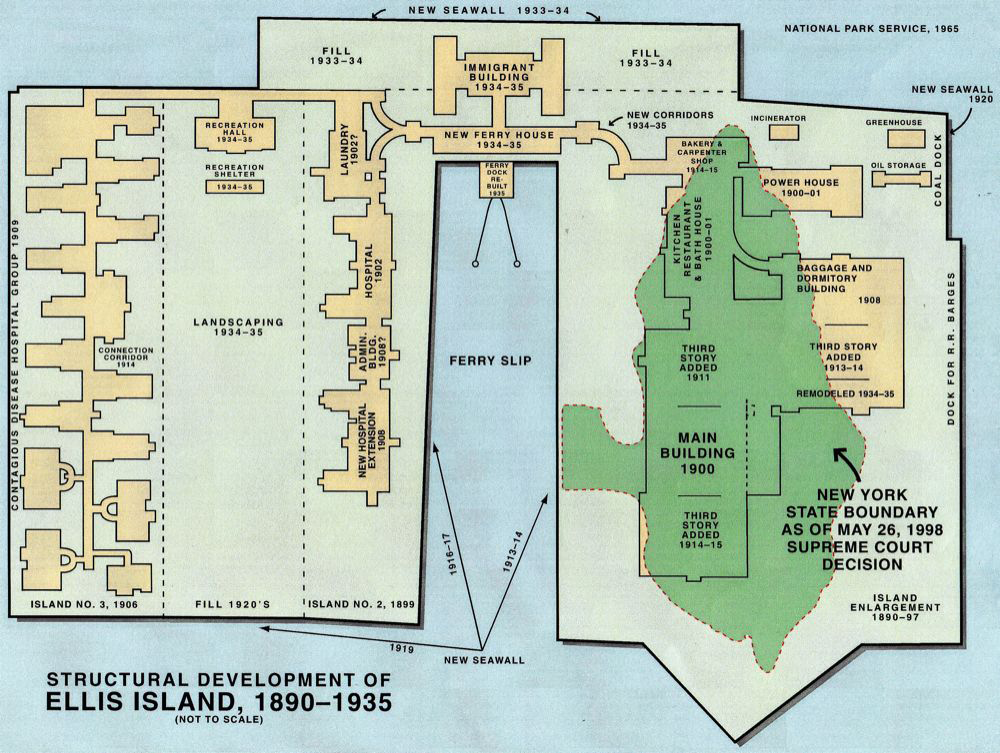
Map of Ellis Island showing New York in dark green surrounded by New Jersey

The federal government, which owned Ellis Island, expanded it from 2.74 acres (1.11 ha) to 27.5 acres (11.1 ha) by land reclamation between 1890 and 1934 to support its use as an immigration station. New Jersey contended that the artificial portions of the island were part of New Jersey because the submerged land under it belonged to New Jersey. Jurisdictional disputes re-emerged in the 1980s, with the renovation of Ellis Island, and then again in the 1990s, with proposed redevelopment of the south side.

In 1992, the Court of Appeals for the Second Circuit ruled that New York's law should apply in a case that happened on the new part of the island.

== Court case ==
New Jersey sued in 1993. The Supreme Court appointed Paul R. Verkuil to be special master to gather evidence in the decision. In 1997, Verkuil recommended in favor of New Jersey's claim to the artificial parts of Ellis Island. In 1998, the Supreme Court ruled in favor of New Jersey in a 6 to 3 decision. Since the land added by the federal government was not expressly granted to New York by the interstate compact, and it had been placed in water that had been expressly granted to New Jersey, the majority ruled that the "new" land, which was now decades old, must belong to New Jersey. The minority used historical reasons and "common-sense inference" as its basis for supporting New York's claim.

According to the court decision, the original 2.74-acre Ellis Island remains under the jurisdiction of New York, but land reclaimed from the waters afterward is under the jurisdiction of New Jersey. The island covers a land area of 27.5 acres (11.1 ha).

== Reaction and aftermath ==
Both states jointly negotiated a post-trial settlement to decide the borders in accordance with the Supreme Court's decision. The 2.74-acre (1.11 ha) original island and other areas negotiated in the post-trial settlement, totaling 4.68 acres (1.89 ha) (17.0%), remain part of New York, which is a landlocked enclave within New Jersey.

The case is possibly the first to use a geographic information system in determining a Supreme Court decision.

Although the court decision changed the state territorial sovereignty of most parts of the island, the actual current landowner and holder of the title of Ellis Island is the federal government. The decision's practical effect was to change how sales tax revenue was apportioned between New Jersey and New York.

Due to the stakes of the case being fairly low, reaction was muted. New York City Mayor Rudy Giuliani quipped, "They’re still not going to convince me that my grandfather, when he was sitting in Italy, thinking of coming to the United States, and on the shores getting ready to get on that ship in Genoa, was saying to himself, ‘I’m coming to New Jersey.’" Governor George Pataki said: "Ellis Island will always be part of New York in the hearts and minds of the millions of immigrants who came to America seeking freedom and liberty. This decision can never change that fact", while New Jersey's governor Christine Whitman commented about the buildings and land in question, "'Of course we're not going to give them back to New York. We've been 160 years in this battle and the Supreme Court has spoken pretty clearly."

== General references ==
- Beyer Blinder Belle; Anderson Notter Finegold (1988). Ellis Island, Statue of Liberty National Monument. Historic Structure Report: Main Building. U.S. Department of the Interior / National Park Service.
- General Services Administration [GSA] Office of Legal Counsel. Ellis Island: Its Legal Status. February 11, 1963. Archived from the original on August 4, 2012.
- Verkuil, Paul R. Final Report of the Special Master. March 31, 1997. Archived from the original on August 7, 2022.
- New Jersey v. New York 1998. 523 U.S. 767. pp. 767–832 (PDF pp. 891–956).
- Text of New Jersey v. New York, 523 U.S. 767 (1998) is available from: Internet Archive (docket files) Justia Library of Congress Oyez (oral argument audio)
