= Jack R. Binns =

American diplomat

Jack Robert Binns
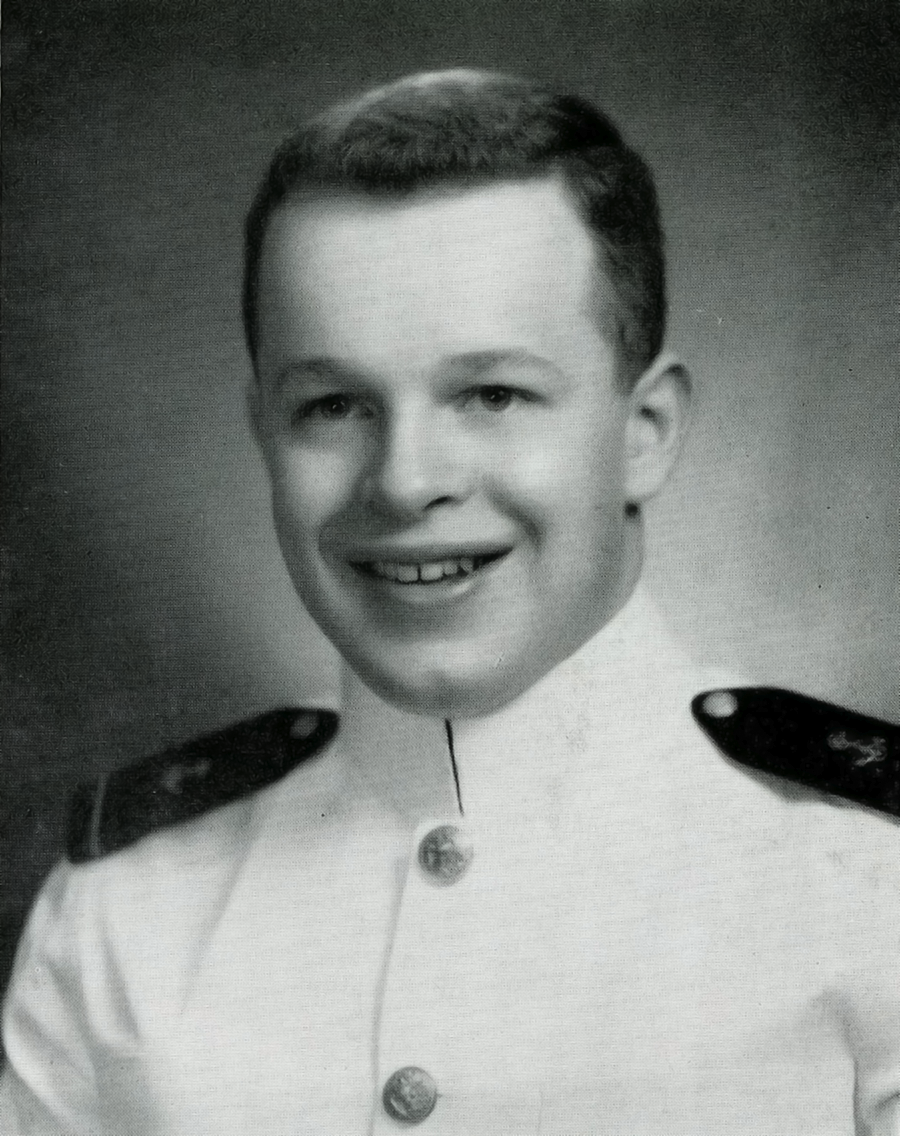

United States Ambassador to Honduras
- In office October 10, 1980 – October 31, 1981
- President: Jimmy Carter; Ronald Reagan
- Preceded by: Mari-Luci Jaramillo
- Succeeded by: John D. Negroponte

Personal details
- Born: May 13, 1933 (age 93) Oregon, U.S.

Jack Robert Binns (born May 13, 1933, in Oregon) was the U.S. Ambassador to Honduras from 1980 to 1981. Binns is a 1956 graduate of the United States Naval Academy.

Now retired from the Foreign Service, Binns is an author and resides in Tucson, Arizona. In 2000, he published his memoirs of his time as an ambassador.

One of three SCOTUS amici for JOSE FRANCISCO SOSA, Petitioner, v. HUMBERTO ALVAREZ-MACHAIN.

== Bibliography ==
- The United States in Honduras, 1980-1981: An Ambassador's Memoir (2000; ISBN 0-7864-0734-4)
- "Weighing Bush's Foreign Policy." The Forum: Vol. 1: No. 1, Article 3. (2002)

Diplomatic posts
Preceded by Mari-Luci Jaramillo	United States Ambassador to Honduras; 1980 – 1981	Succeeded by John D. Negroponte
