= James F. Creagan =

American diplomat (born 1940)

James Francis Creagan (born 1940) is a United States diplomat. From 1996 to 1999, he served as U.S. Ambassador to Honduras. Previously, he had served as Deputy Chief of Mission at the American Embassy to the Holy See and Italy, the Consul General in São Paulo, Brazil, and the Political Counselor at the U.S. Embassy in Brasília. Although he retired broadly from public service in 1999, he stepped in briefly in 2009 in Bolivia as special Chargé d'Affaires.

Creagan is the director of the Center for International Studies at the University of the Incarnate Word, where he teaches courses for the Government and International Affairs Department. Formerly, he served as president of John Cabot University in Rome.

In January 2016, Ambassador Creagan was named the Ambassador Eugene Scassa Visiting professor of International Diplomacy at St. Mary's University, San Antonio, Texas, where he teaches courses in the Political Science Department.

== Sources ==
- Biography from UIC Library's Electronic Research Collection
- https://web.archive.org/web/20120217035812/http://uiw.edu/polisci/creagan.htm

Diplomatic posts
Preceded by William Thornton Pryce	United States Ambassador to Honduras; 1996 – 1999	Succeeded by Frank Almaguer
