= John Arthur Ferch =

American diplomat (1936–2020)

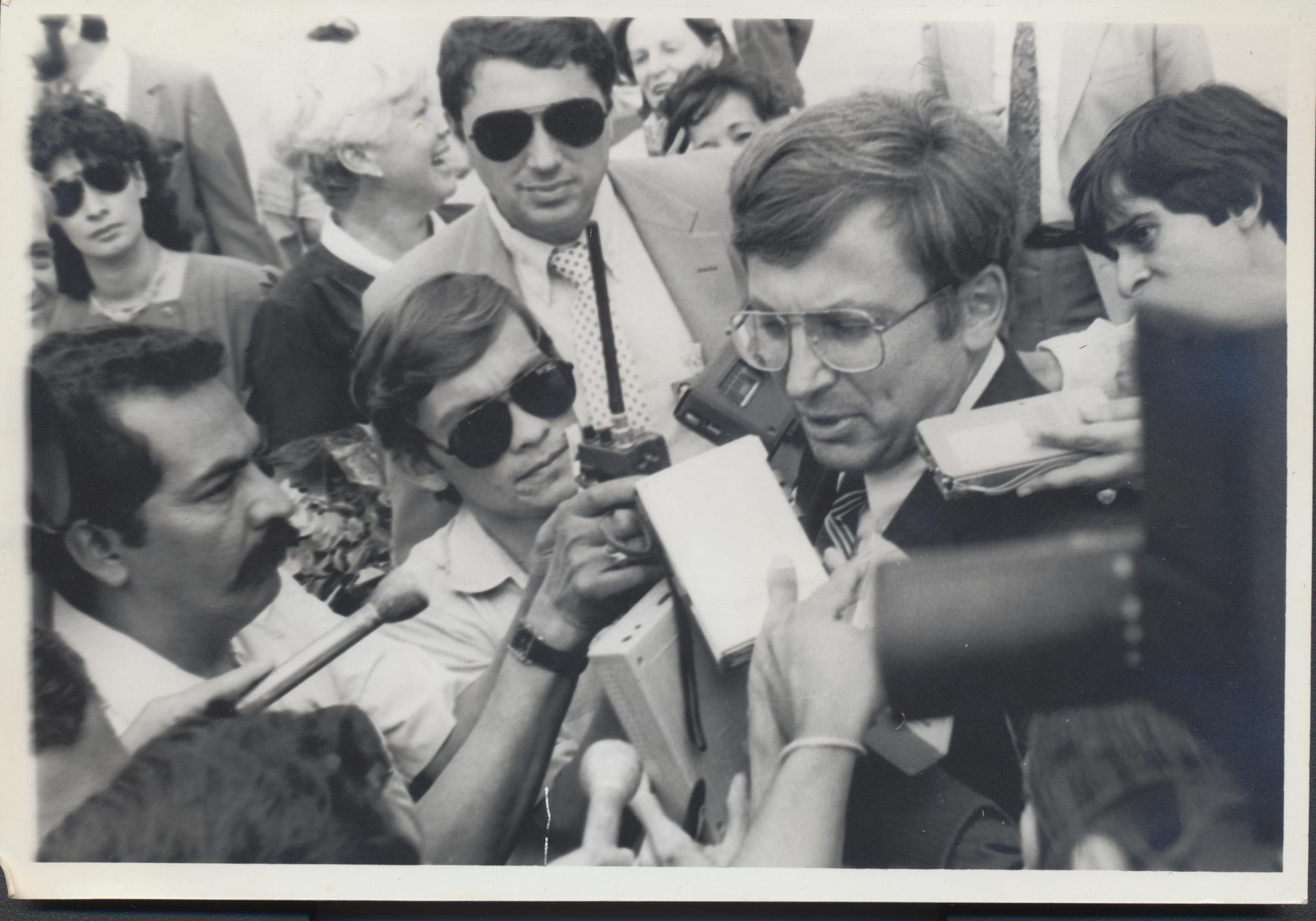

15th United States Ambassador to Honduras
- In office August 22, 1985 – July 9, 1986
- President: Ronald Reagan
- Preceded by: John D. Negroponte
- Succeeded by: Everett Ellis Briggs

Chief of the U.S. Interests Section in Cuba
- In office August 1982 – July 1985
- President: Ronald Reagan
- Preceded by: Wayne S. Smith
- Succeeded by: Curtis W. Kamman

Personal details
- Born: February 6, 1936 Toledo, Ohio, U.S.
- Died: May 5, 2020 (aged 84) Fairfax, Virginia, U.S.
- Profession: Diplomat

John Arthur Ferch (February 6, 1936 – May 5, 2020) was an American diplomat.

Ferch was born in Ohio in 1936. He grew up in Toledo and graduated from Princeton University in 1958.

A career Foreign Service officer, he served as United States Ambassador to Honduras from 1985 to 1986.

Ferch died on May 5, 2020, at the age of 84.

Diplomatic posts
Preceded by John D. Negroponte	United States Ambassador to Honduras; 1985 – 1986	Succeeded by Everett Ellis Briggs
