= Lisa Kubiske =

American diplomat

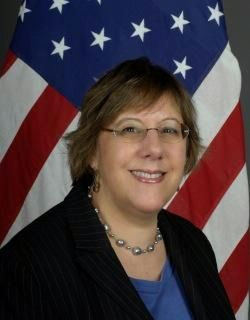

United States Ambassador to Honduras
- In office July 26, 2011 – August 2, 2014
- President: Barack Obama
- Preceded by: Hugo Llorens
- Succeeded by: James D. Nealon

Personal details
- Born: Lisa Jean Shapiro; March 21, 1954 (age 72)
- Spouse: Dan Kubiske
- Awards: Valor Award; Superior Honor Award

Lisa Jean Kubiske (born March 21, 1954) is an American diplomat; from July 2011 to August 2014 she was the United States Ambassador to Honduras.

Kubiske had served the Deputy Assistant Secretary for International Finance and Development at the State Department under the Bureau of Economic and Business Affairs.

She was forced to retire from the Foreign Service in 2017 as part of the Trump Administration program to cut the size of the diplomatic corps by one-third.

== Background ==
Kubiske graduated from Brandeis University with a BA in anthropology and psychology, and from Georgetown University with a Masters of Science in Foreign Service (MSFS). She spent a junior year abroad at Pontificia Universidad Católica del Perú.

She was the director of the Office of Regional Economic Policy and Summit Coordination, in the Bureau of Western Hemisphere Affairs. She also served as Deputy Chief of Mission of the United States Mission in Brazil.

== Family ==
She is married to freelance journalist Dan Kubiske; they have two sons. Kubiske also has one stepdaughter and one granddaughter.

== Notes ==
Diplomatic posts
Preceded by Hugo Llorens	United States Ambassador to Honduras; 2011–2014	Succeeded by James D. Nealon
