= Hewson A. Ryan =

American diplomat

United States Ambassador to Honduras
- In office November 5, 1969 – May 30, 1973
- President: Richard Nixon
- Preceded by: Joseph J. Jova
- Succeeded by: Phillip V. Sanchez

Personal details
- Born: June 16, 1922 New Haven, Connecticut, U.S.
- Died: September 28, 1991 (aged 69) Boston, Massachusetts, U.S.

Hewson Anthony Ryan (June 16, 1922 – September 28, 1991) was an American diplomat who served as the United States Ambassador to Honduras from 1969 to 1973.

Ryan attended Yale University, interrupted by World War II when he served with the United States Army in Europe from 1942 to 1946. He completed his B.A. degree in 1946 and then earned an M.A. degree in 1948. Ryan continued his studies at the University of Madrid, earning a Ph.D. degree in 1950. After briefly teaching Spanish at Yale, he joined the United States Foreign Service as a member of the United States Information Agency in 1951.

After retiring from the Foreign Service, Ryan was a professor of public diplomacy at the Fletcher School at Tufts University from 1977 to 1990.

He died of a heart attack on September 28, 1991, in Boston, Massachusetts at age 69.
