= Diego C. Asencio =

American diplomat (1931–2020)

Diego Asencio
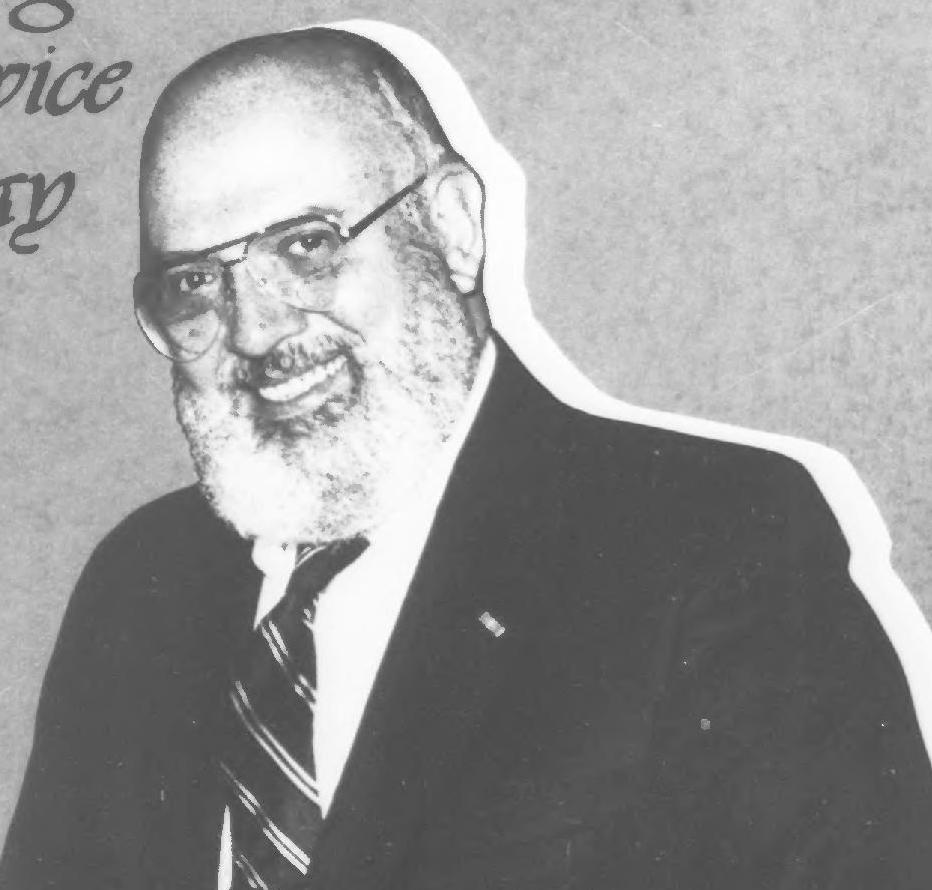
- Asencio in June 1990

17th United States Ambassador to Colombia
- In office December 6, 1977 – June 22, 1980
- President: Jimmy Carter
- Preceded by: Phillip V. Sanchez
- Succeeded by: Thomas D. Boyatt

21st United States Ambassador to Brazil
- In office December 20, 1983 – February 28, 1986
- President: Ronald Reagan
- Preceded by: Langhorne A. Motley
- Succeeded by: Harry W. Shlaudeman

8th Assistant Secretary of State for Consular Affairs
- In office August 29, 1980 – November 21, 1983
- Preceded by: Barbara M. Watson
- Succeeded by: Joan M. Clark

Personal details
- Born: July 15, 1931
- Died: October 6, 2020 (aged 89) Palm Beach, Florida, U.S.
- Profession: Diplomat

Diego Cortes Asencio (July 15, 1931 – October 6, 2020) was an American diplomat who served as United States Ambassador to Colombia (1977–1980) and United States Ambassador to Brazil (1983–86). He was a member of the American Academy of Diplomacy and Council on Foreign Relations.

In 1980 Asencio was – along with a dozen other diplomats – held hostage for 61 days when members of the guerrilla group 19th of April Movement (M-19), led by Rosemberg Pabón, seized the Dominican Republic's embassy in Bogotá.

== Books ==
- Diego Asencio (1983), Our Man Is Inside, Little Brown, ISBN 978-0-316-05294-8

Diplomatic posts
Preceded by Phillip V. Sanchez	United States Ambassador to Colombia; December 6, 1977 – June 22, 1980	Succeeded by Thomas D. Boyatt
Government offices
Preceded by Barbara M. Watson	Assistant Secretary of State for Consular Affairs; August 29, 1980 – November 21, 1983	Succeeded by Joan M. Clark
Diplomatic posts
Preceded by Langhorne A. Motley	United States Ambassador to Brazil; December 20, 1983 – February 28, 1986	Succeeded by Harry W. Shlaudeman
