= William Thornton Pryce =

American diplomat (1932–2006)

William Thornton Pryce (1932–2006) was a United States diplomat and Ambassador to Honduras.

Pryce was born in San Diego, California on 19 July 1932. His father, Roland Fremont Pryce, was a career naval officer. He graduated from Ebensburg High School, Wesleyan University and the Fletcher School of Law and Diplomacy. After three years' service as an officer in the U.S. Navy, he joined the Foreign Service in 1958.

Pryce, a career Foreign Service Officer, served overseas in posts in Latin America and the Soviet Union. His Washington posts included service as assistant to Under Secretary of State Thomas C. Mann and to Ambassador Ellsworth Bunker. In the 1980s and early 1990s, Pryce was an alternate representative of the United States to the Organization of American States and served as senior director of the National Security Council. He served as United States Ambassador to Honduras from 1992 to 1996.

Pryce had a wife, Joan Marie Pryce, with whom he had a daughter, Kathy Ellen Pryce, and two sons, Jeffrey Fremont Pryce and Scott Fisher Pryce.

He died at his home in Alexandria, Virginia from pancreatic cancer on July 11, 2006.

== Sources ==
- Holley, Joe (2006-07-19). "William Pryce; Ambassador to Honduras". The Washington Post.

Diplomatic posts
Preceded by Cresencio S. Arcos, Jr.	United States Ambassador to Honduras; 1993 – 1996	Succeeded by James F. Creagan
