= George T. Summerlin =

American army officer and diplomat

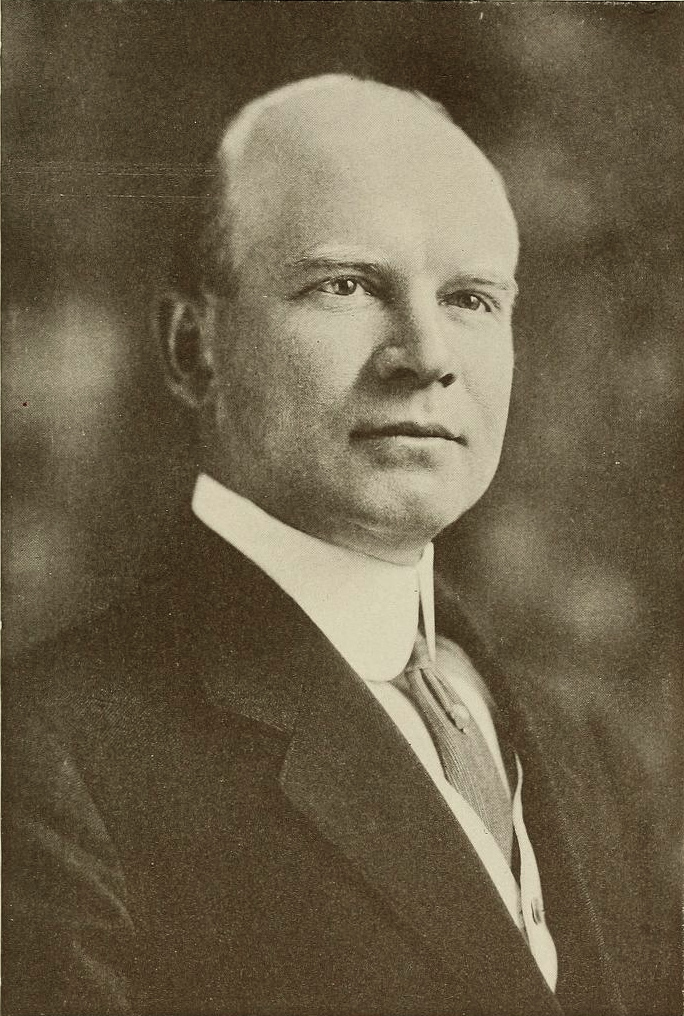

6th Chief of Protocol of the United States
- In office July 29, 1937 – January 15, 1944
- President: Franklin D. Roosevelt
- Preceded by: Richard Southgate
- Succeeded by: Stanley Woodward

United States Minister to Panama
- In office March 8, 1935 – July 7, 1937
- President: Franklin D. Roosevelt
- Preceded by: Antonio C. Gonzalez
- Succeeded by: Frank P. Corrigan

United States Minister to Venezuela
- In office February 21, 1930 – January 15, 1935
- President: Herbert Hoover; Franklin D. Roosevelt
- Preceded by: Willis C. Cook
- Succeeded by: Meredith Nicholson

United States Minister to Honduras
- In office November 21, 1925 – December 17, 1929
- President: Calvin Coolidge
- Preceded by: Franklin E. Morales
- Succeeded by: Julius Gareché Lay

Personal details
- Born: George Thomas Summerlin

George Thomas Summerlin (November 11, 1872 – July 1, 1947) was an American army officer and diplomat from Louisiana.

He was born in Rayville, Louisiana and studied at private schools there. In 1888, he began college at Louisiana State University, before transferring two years later to the United States Military Academy. He graduated from the latter in 1896, and was chosen aide-de-camp to General Theodore Schwan at the outbreak of the Spanish–American War. He rose to the rank of captain in the U.S. Army before resigning in 1903. After a few years in business in Pittsburgh, he entered the State Department as a clerk. After rising through the ranks and serving in Japan, China, Mexico and Italy, he was appointed Minister to Honduras in 1924. In 1929, he was transferred to Venezuela, and in 1934 to Panama.

In 1937, President Roosevelt appointed Summerlin Chief of Protocol of the United States. He was promoted to Special Assistant to the Secretary in 1944 and retired for health reasons in 1946. He died at the Navy Medical Center in Bethesda, Maryland.

Summerlin was married in 1899 to Virginia Loomis, a granddaughter of Jacob Jay Vandergrift.
