= Larry Leon Palmer =

American diplomat (1949–2021)

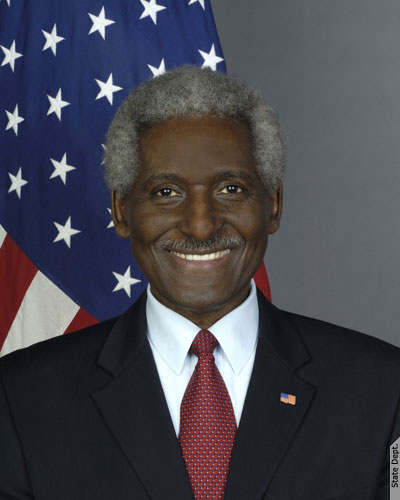

United States Ambassador to Grenada
- In office June 28, 2012 – January 19, 2016
- President: Barack Obama
- Preceded by: Christopher Sandrolini (Acting)
- Succeeded by: Linda Taglialatela

United States Ambassador to Saint Kitts and Nevis
- In office June 26, 2012 – January 19, 2016
- President: Barack Obama
- Preceded by: Christopher Sandrolini (Acting)
- Succeeded by: Linda Taglialatela

10th United States Ambassador to Antigua and Barbuda
- In office June 25, 2012 – January 19, 2016
- President: Barack Obama
- Preceded by: Mary M. Ourisman
- Succeeded by: Linda Taglialatela

United States Ambassador to Saint Vincent and the Grenadines
- In office June 7, 2012 – January 19, 2016
- President: Barack Obama
- Preceded by: Christopher Sandrolini (Acting)
- Succeeded by: Linda Taglialatela

United States Ambassador to Saint Lucia
- In office June 4, 2012 – January 19, 2016
- President: Barack Obama
- Preceded by: Christopher Sandrolini (Acting)
- Succeeded by: Linda Taglialatela

United States Ambassador to Dominica
- In office May 30, 2012 – January 19, 2016
- President: Barack Obama
- Preceded by: Christopher Sandrolini (Acting)
- Succeeded by: Linda Taglialatela

United States Ambassador to Barbados
- In office May 22, 2012 – January 19, 2016
- President: Barack Obama
- Preceded by: Christopher Sandrolini (Acting)
- Succeeded by: Linda Taglialatela

Special Representative to the Organisation of Eastern Caribbean States
- In office May 22, 2012 – January 19, 2016
- President: Barack Obama
- Preceded by: Christopher Sandrolini (Acting)
- Succeeded by: Linda Taglialatela

United States Ambassador to Honduras
- In office October 8, 2002 – May 7, 2005
- President: George W. Bush
- Preceded by: Frank Almaguer
- Succeeded by: Charles Ford

Personal details
- Born: July 13, 1949 Augusta, Georgia, U.S.
- Died: April 22, 2021 (aged 71)
- Education: Emory University; Texas Southern University; Indiana University Bloomington

Larry Leon Palmer (July 13, 1949 – April 22, 2021) was an American diplomat who served as the United States Ambassador to Barbados and the Eastern Caribbean from 2012 to 2015. He was the United States Ambassador to Honduras from 2002 to 2005. He also served as the President of the Inter-American Foundation from 2005 to June 2010.

== Background ==
Larry Palmer was born in Augusta, Georgia. He graduated from Emory University with a B.A. in 1970 and completed his graduate training at Texas Southern University (M.Ed., African History, 1973) and Indiana University Bloomington (Ed.D., Higher Education Administration and African Studies, 1978). While at Emory, he was a member of the Pi Kappa Alpha fraternity.

== Career ==
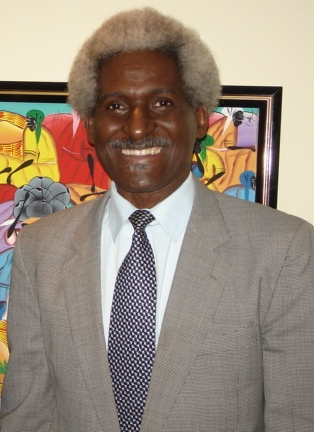
Palmer in 2006

Palmer served as a Peace Corps volunteer in Liberia, West Africa from 1971 to 1973. He then worked as assistant director of financial aid at the University of Virginia in Charlottesville (1973–1974), and as a professor of history at Cuttington College in Suakoko, Liberia (1974–1976), and at Wake Forest University in Winston-Salem, North Carolina (1978–1981).

Palmer entered the U.S. Foreign Service in 1982. He served as vice consul in the Dominican Republic (1982–1984), and then as personnel officer in Montevideo, Uruguay, and Asuncion, Paraguay, from 1984 to 1986. He worked in the State Department as staff assistant to the Assistant Secretary for African Affairs from 1986 to 1987 and then served as counselor for administration in Freetown, Sierra Leone from 1987 to 1989.

In 1989, Palmer became a Pearson Fellow, serving as assistant to the president of the University of Texas at El Paso. His portfolio was advancing the North American Free Trade Agreement (NAFTA), creating faculty and student exchange opportunities in universities throughout Mexico, and serving as university consultant for International Affairs. At the end of two years as a Pearson Fellow, Palmer left to serve as personnel officer in Seoul, South Korea, (1991–1994), and later served as counselor for administration in the Dominican Republic (1994–1998).

From 1998 to 1999, he attended the Senior Seminar. He arrived in Quito, Ecuador to begin a tour as Deputy Chief of Mission in August 1999. He finished his tour in Quito as Chargé d'Affaires In July 2002.

=== Honduras, Venezuela and Eastern Caribbean ===
Palmer was sworn in as United States Ambassador to Honduras on September 9, 2002, by Secretary of State Colin Powell and delivered his credentials to the Honduran President Ricardo Maduro on October 9, 2002. On June 28, 2010, President Obama nominated Palmer as United States Ambassador to Venezuela. However, a start date as new ambassador to Venezuela wasn't announced. On September 19, 2010, President Hugo Chávez announced on his weekly TV program that he would not allow Larry Palmer to take up his post in Caracas. Chávez's refusal is based on Palmer having recently told a US senator that morale in the Venezuelan army was low and that members of Chávez's government had ties to leftist Colombian rebels. On December 28, 2010, Chavez defied the Obama administration's appointment of Palmer as ambassador to Venezuela and flatly refused him, accusing him of having made disrespectful remarks about Venezuela. In response, on December 29 the U.S. revoked the visa of Venezuela's ambassador, Bernardo Álvarez Herrera.

Palmer was appointed to serve as the United States Ambassador to Barbados and the Eastern Caribbean in 2012. In this post, he served concurrently as the ambassador to Antigua and Barbuda, Barbados, Dominica, Grenada, Saint Kitts and Nevis, Saint Lucia, and Saint Vincent and the Grenadines.

Diplomatic posts
Preceded by Frank Almaguer	United States Ambassador to Honduras; 2002–2005	Succeeded by Charles Ford
Preceded by Christopher Sandrolini; Acting	Special Representative to the Organisation of Eastern Caribbean States; 2012–2015	Succeeded by Linda Taglialatela
Preceded by Christopher Sandrolini; Acting	United States Ambassador to Barbados; 2012–2015	Succeeded by Linda Taglialatela
Preceded by Christopher Sandrolini; Acting	United States Ambassador to Dominica; 2012–2015	Succeeded by Linda Taglialatela
Preceded by Christopher Sandrolini; Acting	United States Ambassador to Saint Lucia; 2012–2015	Succeeded by Linda Taglialatela
Preceded by Christopher Sandrolini; Acting	United States Ambassador to Saint Vincent and the Grenadines; 2012–2015	Succeeded by Linda Taglialatela
Preceded by Christopher Sandrolini; Acting	United States Ambassador to Antigua and Barbuda; 2012–2015	Succeeded by Linda Taglialatela
Preceded by Christopher Sandrolini; Acting	United States Ambassador to Saint Kitts and Nevis; 2012–2015	Succeeded by Linda Taglialatela
Preceded by Christopher Sandrolini; Acting	United States Ambassador to Grenada; 2012–2015	Succeeded by Linda Taglialatela
