= Hugo Llorens =

American diplomat (born 1954)

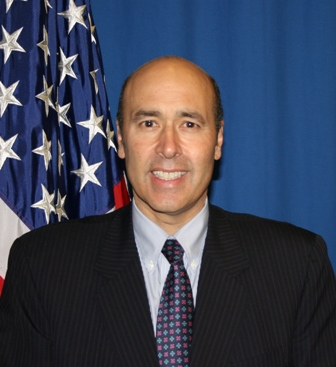

United States Ambassador to Afghanistan Acting
- In office December 3, 2016 – November 17, 2017
- President: Barack Obama; Donald Trump
- Preceded by: Michael McKinley
- Succeeded by: John Bass

United States Ambassador to Honduras
- In office September 19, 2008 – July 3, 2011
- President: George W. Bush; Barack Obama
- Preceded by: Charles A. Ford
- Succeeded by: Lisa Kubiske

Personal details
- Born: September 7, 1954 (age 72) Cuba
- Spouse: Lisett Aparicio Llorens
- Children: 2

Hugo Llorens (born September 7, 1954) is a retired American diplomat. He is a former U.S. Special Chargé d'Affaires of the U.S. Embassy in Kabul, Afghanistan, (2016–17) and United States Ambassador to Honduras (2008–2011). In his 36-year career he was posted to numerous countries spanning 6 continents. In 2002–2003, he joined the White House staff and served as Director of Andean Affairs advising the President and National Security Advisor on issues pertaining to Colombia, Venezuela, Bolivia, Peru, and Ecuador.

== Background ==
Born in Cuba in 1954, Llorens came to the United States at the age of seven in April 1962 as part of Operation Peter Pan.

== Education ==
Llorens earned a Bachelor of Science in Foreign Service at the Edmund A. Walsh School of Foreign Service of Georgetown University in 1977. He then went on to receive a Master of Arts in Economics from the University of Kent at Canterbury, England in 1980. In 1997 he was awarded a Master of Science in National Security Studies from the National War College.

== Pre-State Department career ==
Llorens worked as an Assistant Treasurer at the Chase Manhattan Bank, International Division, New York City, before joining the United States Department of State in 1981.

== Diplomatic career ==
Llorens served as deputy director of the Office of Economic Policy and Summit Coordination in the Bureau of Inter-American Affairs, in which capacity he "contributed to the launch of the historic Free Trade Area of the Americas (FTAA) negotiations in 1998". From 1999 to 2002 Llorens served for three years as Principal Officer at the United States Consulate General in Vancouver, British Columbia, Canada. During his tenure in Vancouver he created a novel Law Enforcement Hub and opened FBI, Secret Service, ATF, DEA and legacy Customs and Immigration offices at the consulate. The establishment of the Hub led to a significant enhancement of U.S. and Canadian coordination in the fight against organized crime and terrorism. Llorens was also the senior U.S. official in British Columbia during the January 1, 2000 arrest of Millennium Bomber Ahmed Ressam in Washington state.

In 2002 and 2003, he served in Washington, D.C., as director of Andean affairs at the National Security Council. There he was the principal advisor to the president and National Security Advisor on issues pertaining to Colombia, Venezuela, Bolivia, Peru, and Ecuador. As National Security Council director he drafted and managed inter-agency coordination for a new U.S. policy approach on Colombia (NSPD-18) in the wake of the election of President Uribe. Llorens also managed the successful official visits to Washington of President Toledo (Peru), President Sanchez de Lozada (Bolivia), President Uribe (Colombia), and President Gutierrez (Ecuador).

Following his tenure on the White House staff, Llorens was deputy chief of mission at the American embassy in Buenos Aires, Argentina, until July 2006. In Argentina he was a lead player in Bush administration efforts to assist Argentina restore political stability and recover from a massive economic and financial crisis caused by the collapse of the Peso Convertibility scheme. Beginning September 2006, Llorens served as the deputy chief of mission at the American embassy in Madrid. In Spain he worked closely with U.S. and Spanish military and defense authorities to ensure that Spain served as an effective logistical hub for U.S. military aircraft supplying military efforts in Afghanistan and Iraq.

In 2008, President George W. Bush nominated Llorens to be U.S. Ambassador to Honduras. He was confirmed by the U.S. Senate in June 2008 and in August was sworn in by Secretary of State Condoleezza Rice. Llorens presented his credentials as ambassador to the government President Manuel Zelaya Rosales on September 19, 2008. In describing the looming Honduran political crisis, Llorens publicly declared - in reference to President Manuel Zelaya's planned referendum on a proposed constitutional assembly - that:

...One can't violate the Constitution in order to create another Constitution, because if one doesn't respect the Constitution, then we all live under the law of the jungle.

In Honduras, Llorens dealt with the first major international crisis faced by the incoming Obama administration. He worked with all political factions in seeking to resolve the political tensions caused by President Zelaya's attempt to hold a referendum to modify the Honduran constitution. Nevertheless, he opposed the Honduran military's removal by force of the democratically elected government on June 18, 2009. On the instruction of Secretary of State Clinton, Llorens stayed on in Honduras as the only remaining foreign ambassador in Honduras following the military coup. During the coming months he supported the holding of free elections that resulted in National Party standard bearer Pepe Lobo assuming the presidency, and ensure the restoration of the constitutional order. Llorens's role was harshly criticized by those who supported the military's removal of Zelaya.

Llorens diplomatic dispatches released by Wikileaks, caused some controversy in Honduras as Llorens made the case to Washington policymakers that while Zelaya's actions had precipitated the crisis, the United States, as was the case with the broad international community, needed to oppose the illegal and unconstitutional manner in which the seating president was removed from office.

At the conclusion of his three-year term in Honduras, Llorens returned to Washington in 2011 as ambassador-in-residence at the National War College. At National, Llorens taught the art and science of "grand strategy" to the elite student body of senior military officers and civilian officials, and led an initiative to strengthen the leadership curriculum at the school. In 2012, he was assigned to Kabul, Afghanistan, as assistant chief of mission (ACOM), an ambassadorial-ranked position. As the ACOM, Llorens served as the chief operating officer of the largest embassy in the world. As such, Llorens had oversight of all administrative and security operations at the embassy, and directed the critical political, political-military, and reconciliation portfolios. In 2013, Llorens was assigned to Sydney, Australia, where he was the principal officer to this high profile diplomatic mission. In Australia he was the senior officer responsible for managing the logistics of President Obama's successful participation in the 2015 G-20 Summit held in Brisbane. During his time in Sydney, Llorens was known for his strong advocacy of clean energy, innovation, and the expansion of trade and investment links in the Asia Pacific. He also hosted visits by Vice President Biden, Secretary of State Kerry, and several dozen senior Congressional and military delegations.

In 2016, Secretary Kerry asked Ambassador Llorens to return to Afghanistan and lead the embassy in Kabul. As the special charge d'affaires, Llorens was the senior U.S. diplomat in Kabul directing the largest embassy in the world with a staff of more than 8,500 U.S., Afghan and third country nationals representing 22 U.S. government agencies. In Afghanistan, Llorens managed ties with the National Unity Government led by President Ghani and Chief Executive Abdullah. He also was the key U.S. civilian official in Afghanistan during the transition between the administrations of President Obama and Trump. Llorens also worked closely with U.S. and NATO military counterparts, and senior Trump administration officials, including Secretary of State Tillerson, Secretary of Defense Mattis, and National Security Advisor McMaster in developing a new and more robust policy approach on Afghanistan and South Asia formally enunciated by President Trump on August 17, 2017. Llorens completed his mission in Kabul in late November 2017 and retired from the U.S. Foreign Service on December 31, 2017.

Llorens has earned numerous awards for distinguished performance, including eight Superior Honor and five Meritorious Honor Awards. He is a past recipient of the Cobb Award for excellence in the promotion of U.S. business, was runner-up for the Saltzman Award for distinguished performance in advancing U.S. international economic interests, and was nominated for the James Baker Award for superior performance by a deputy chief of mission. In June 2019, German president Steinmeier awarded Ambassador Llorens the Order of Merit for his unswerving support for the German diplomatic delegation in the wake of the May 31, 2017 bombing of the German embassy in Kabul Afghanistan. He speaks Spanish, Tagalog, and some French.

Ambassador Llorens currently lives with his wife Lisett in their home in Marco Island, Florida. He is the CEO of an international consulting firm (Ambassador Hugo Llorens and Global Partners LLC). He also teaches, does public speaking, serves on advisory boards of private companies, and is writing the first of several books. In his free time, Llorens is a passionate tennis player and avid fly fisherman (salt and freshwater).

== Selected works ==
- Kirby Smith and Hugo Llorens (1998), "Renaissance and Decay: A Comparison of Socioeconomic Indicators in Pre-Castro and Current-Day Cuba", Cuba in Transition: Volume 8: Papers and Proceedings of the 8th Annual Meeting of the Association for the Study of the Cuban Economy (ASCE), Miami, Florida, August 6–8, 1998

== Footnotes ==
Diplomatic posts
Preceded by Charles A. Ford	United States Ambassador to Honduras; 2008–2011	Succeeded by Lisa Kubiske
Preceded by P. Michael McKinley	United States Ambassador to Afghanistan; Acting; 2016–2017	Succeeded by John R. Bass
