= Roland Fremont Pryce =

American naval officer

Roland Fremont ("Monty") Pryce (1906-1984) was a United States naval officer who served as a Naval Adviser to the Secretary of State at the Paris Peace Conference and Council of Foreign Ministers after World War II.

Pryce was born on July 10, 1906, in Ebensburg, Cambria County, Pennsylvania, and graduated from the United States Naval Academy in the Class of 1927. Pryce served as Commanding Officer of the submarines USS S-38 (1938–40); USS Spearfish (1941-42); and USS Shad (1943). In 1944, he was involved in the preparation and execution of the Normandy landings as Operations Officer, 12th Fleet. After World War II, Pryce served as Deputy Naval Adviser to Secretary of State for the Paris Peace Conferenceand Naval Adviser for the Nov.-Dec. 1946 Council of Foreign Ministers. He was the representative of the United States on the Four Power Naval Commission, 1947-1949.

Pryce later served as C.O. of the USS Adirondack, as Commander of the Service Force, Sixth Fleet, and as Asst Chief of Staff for Arctic Operations in the construction of the DEW Line. He retired from the Navy in 1957. He was a recipient of the Bronze Star Medal; CBE (Britain); the Croix de Guerre (France) and the Royal Order of the Phoenix (Greece). He was the father of Ambassador William Thornton Pryce and grandfather of Jeffrey Fremont Pryce.
