= Joseph J. Jova =

American diplomat

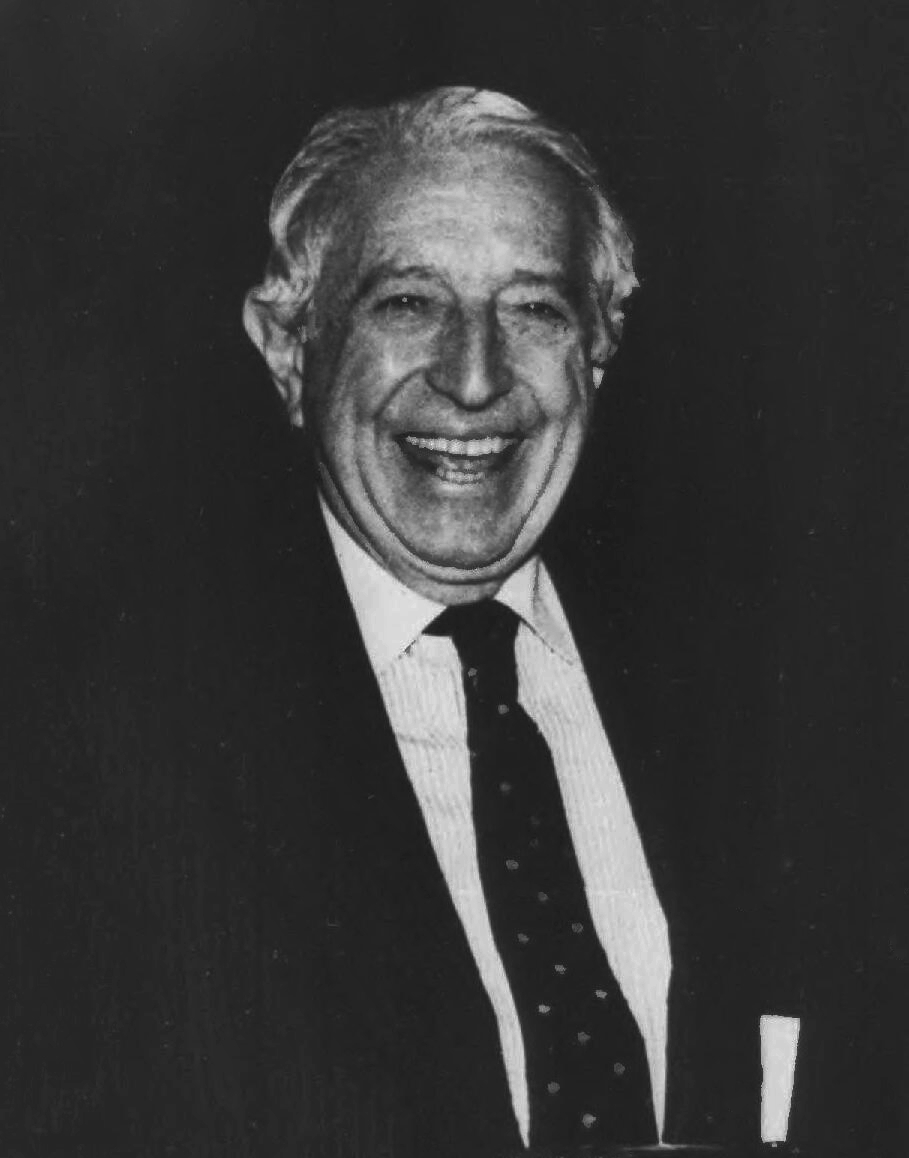

7th United States Ambassador to the Organization of American States
- In office 1969–1974
- President: Richard Nixon
- Preceded by: Sol M. Linowitz
- Succeeded by: William S. Mailliard

Personal details
- Born: 1916 Browstown, New York
- Died: March 31, 1993 (aged 75) Washington, D.C.
- Spouse: Pamela (nee Johnson)
- Relations: Henri Jova (brother)
- Children: 3
- Education: Dartmouth College

Joseph John Jova (1916 – March 31, 1993) was an American diplomat.

He served as the United States Ambassador to Honduras from 1965 to 1969, the United States Ambassador to the Organization of American States from 1969 to 1973, and the United States Ambassador to Mexico from 1973 to 1977.

== Early life and education ==
Joseph Jova was born in Browston, five miles north of Newburgh, New York, to a prominent European-Caribbean family. His grandfather was a major landowner in colonial Cuba and his grandmother from a New York French family involved in the sugar industry, and later became a prominent brick manufacturer. He attended boarding school in Coral Gables, Florida and graduated from Dartmouth College in 1938.

== Career ==
After graduation, he worked for the United Fruit Company in Guatemala. After the attack on Pearl Harbor in 1941, he applied to all three services but was turned down for being underweight, having suffered amoebic dysentery and other conditions. He was finally accepted into the United States Navy in March 1942, serving as a lieutenant in Panama and Europe.

After the Second World War, he took up a growing interest in foreign relations and took the Foreign Service exam in 1946 while still stationed in Paris. The following year he joined the United States Department of State and served as Vice Consul to Basra, Iraq during the crucial period after the discovery of oil there. In addition to southern Iraq, the small consulate also handled affairs with Kuwait, where the U.S. had not opened an embassy as Britain considered it within their sphere of influence.

He was next posted to Tangier, Morocco, arriving on Thanksgiving Day 1949, and participated in negotiations for the Pact of Algeciras. After that, he was stationed in Porto, Portugal, then transferred to the embassy in Lisbon in 1954 as head of the political section. He returned to the U.S. in 1957 and worked at the State Department as a France-Iberia expert and in personnel.

He was appointed deputy chief of mission to the U.S. Embassy to Chile in Santiago, under Ambassador Charles W. Cole. In the summer of 1965 he was appointed Ambassador to Honduras, where he served until 1969. He served as representative to the Organization of American States from 1969 to 1973, and U.S. Ambassador to Mexico from 1973 to 1977. During his term in Mexico the UN adopted the "Zionism is Racism" resolution (General Assembly Resolution 3379) that also equated Zionism with Southafrica's Apartheid, after the push of the Non-Aligned Movement, the Arab countries, and the support of the Soviet bloc, on the context of the World Conference on Women, 1975 in Mexico. This resulted in a touristic boycott of the American Jewish community against Mexico, which made visible internal and external conflicts of Mexican politics. This was received as a direct attack to the United States, as Jova told to the Interior Minister of Mexico: "The United States is hurt and disappointed with the harmful declarations of President Luis Echeverría, specially because of Mexican attitudes in the international sphere, specially concerning Anti-Zionism and Corea".

He served as President of the Meridian International Center in Washington, D.C. for twelve years after his retirement as ambassador.

== Personal life ==
He was the older brother of architect Henri Jova.

He met and married his British-born wife, the former Pamela Johnson, in Basra in 1949. They had two sons and one daughter.

He died of a thoracic aortic aneurysm on March 31, 1993 in Washington, D.C., at the age of 75.

== Bibliography ==
- Private Investment in Latin America: Renegotiating the Bargain (1975)

Diplomatic posts
Preceded by Charles R. Burrows	United States Ambassador to Honduras; 1965–1969	Succeeded by Hewson A. Ryan
Preceded by Sol Linowitz	United States Ambassador to the Organization of American States; 1969–1973	Succeeded by William S. Mailliard
Preceded by Robert H. McBride	United States Ambassador to Mexico; 1973–1977	Succeeded by Patrick Lucey
