= James D. Nealon =

American diplomat (born 1954)

James D. Nealon Jr.
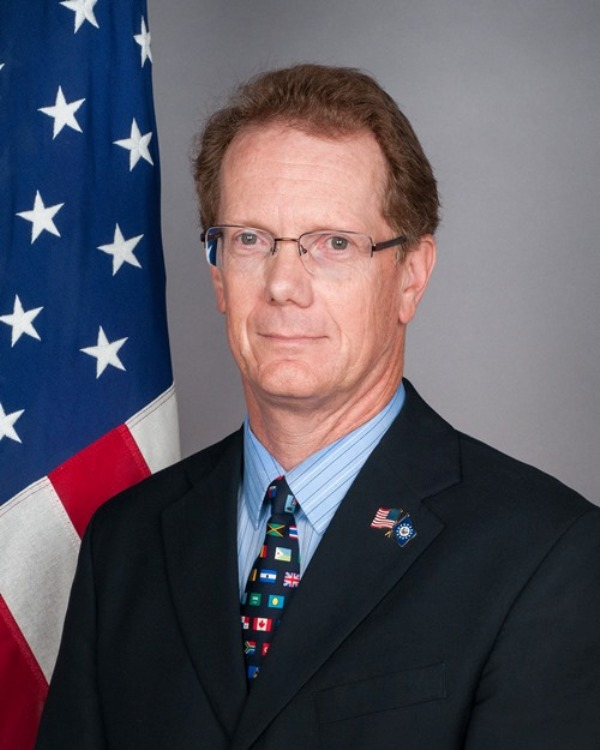

Under Secretary of Homeland Security for Strategy, Policy, and Plans
- Acting
- In office July 10, 2017 – February 8, 2018
- President: Donald Trump
- Preceded by: Position established
- Succeeded by: Chad Wolf

United States Ambassador to Honduras
- In office August 21, 2014 – June 11, 2017
- President: Barack Obama; Donald Trump
- Preceded by: Lisa Kubiske
- Succeeded by: Laura Farnsworth Dogu (2022)

Personal details
- Born: 1954 (age 71–72)
- Education: Brown University (BA); Boston College
- Awards: Superior Honor Award

James Dinneen Nealon Jr. (born 1954) is an American diplomat who served as United States Ambassador to Honduras from 2014 to 2017. After his service as ambassador, he worked in the Department of Homeland Security from 2017 to 2018.

== Biography ==
Born in Virginia, the son of a land surveyor, Nealon studied history at Brown University before studying at Boston College.

A career Foreign Service officer, Nealon held posts in Canada, Uruguay, Hungary, Spain, and Chile before assuming his post as Ambassador to Honduras in August 2014; Nealon also served as the deputy of John F. Kelly, whilst Kelly was in charge of the United States Southern Command.

After leaving his ambassadorship in 2017, Nealon was appointed assistant secretary for international engagement at the Department of Homeland Security by Kelly in July. During his time as assistant secretary, Nealon supported a policy of deploying Homeland Security agents abroad. He resigned his post on February 8, 2018, due to his disagreements with the immigration policy of Donald Trump, and, specifically, the withdrawal of temporary protected status for Hondurans.

Diplomatic posts
Preceded by Lisa Kubiske	United States Ambassador to Honduras; 2014–2017	Succeeded by Heide Fulton, chargé d'affaires
Political offices
New office	Under Secretary of Homeland Security for Strategy, Policy, and Plans; Acting; 2017–2018	Succeeded by Chad Wolf
