= Joseph Modeste Sweeney =

American lawyer

- Sweeney pictured in The Jambalaya 1970, Tulane yearbook
- Born: September 6, 1920; Philadelphia, Pennsylvania
- Died: December 11, 2000 (aged 80); Denver, Colorado
- Known for: Tulane University Law School dean
- Scientific career
- Fields: Law

Joseph Modeste Sweeney (September 6, 1920 – December 11, 2000) was the 16th dean of the Tulane University Law School, serving from 1968 to 1977. He graduated from Harvard Law School in 1948 and began a career specializing in international law.

Academic offices
Preceded by Cecil Morgan	Tulane University Law School Dean; 1968–1977	Succeeded by Paul R. Verkuil
