= Ralph Elihu Becker =

United States ambassador (1907–1994)

United States Ambassador to Honduras
- In office October 27, 1976 – August 1, 1977
- President: Gerald Ford
- Preceded by: Phillip V. Sanchez
- Succeeded by: Mari-Luci Jaramillo

Personal details
- Born: January 29, 1907 New York City, New York, U.S.
- Died: August 24, 1994 (aged 87) Washington, D.C., U.S.
- Resting place: Arlington National Cemetery
- Children: Ralph Becker
- Education: St. John's University (LLB)

Military service
- Branch/service: United States Army
- Battles/wars: World War II

Ralph Elihu Becker Sr. (January 29, 1907 – August 24, 1994) was an American diplomat and attorney who served as U.S. Ambassador to Honduras from 1976–1977 under the Ford administration. He was a founding trustee of the National Center for the Performing Arts and served as its general counsel during the Eisenhower administration and until 1976.

== Early life and education ==
Ralph Becker was born on January 29, 1907, in New York City, to a tailor from Lithuania and a mother from Minsk. He took night courses at the City College of New York earned his law degree from St. John's University law school in 1928.

== Career ==
He served in the Judge Advocate General's Corps in World War II as a part of the 30th Infantry Division. He landed in Normandy after D-Day and won a Bronze Star, along with medals from the Belgian, French, and Dutch governments.

After his discharge, he worked as a lawyer in Westchester County, New York. He went to Washington, D. C. and was the chairman for the Young Republican National Committee from 1946 to 1950. In the 1960s, he joined an Arctic expedition that he had helped sponsor, and brought back a pair of polar bears as a gift for the National Zoo in Washington, D.C. From 1976 to 1977, he was appointed Ambassador to Honduras.

== Personal life ==
Becker died of congestive heart failure at the George Washington University Hospital on August 24, 1994. He was interred soon afterwards in Arlington National Cemetery.

His son Ralph Elihu Becker Jr. was elected Mayor of Salt Lake City, Utah in 2007.

== See also ==
- List of Chairpersons of the College Republicans

Diplomatic posts
Preceded by Phillip V. Sanchez	United States Ambassador to Honduras; 1976–1977	Succeeded by Mari-Luci Jaramillo
