= Linda Swartz Taglialatela =

American diplomat (born 1949)

Linda Taglialatela
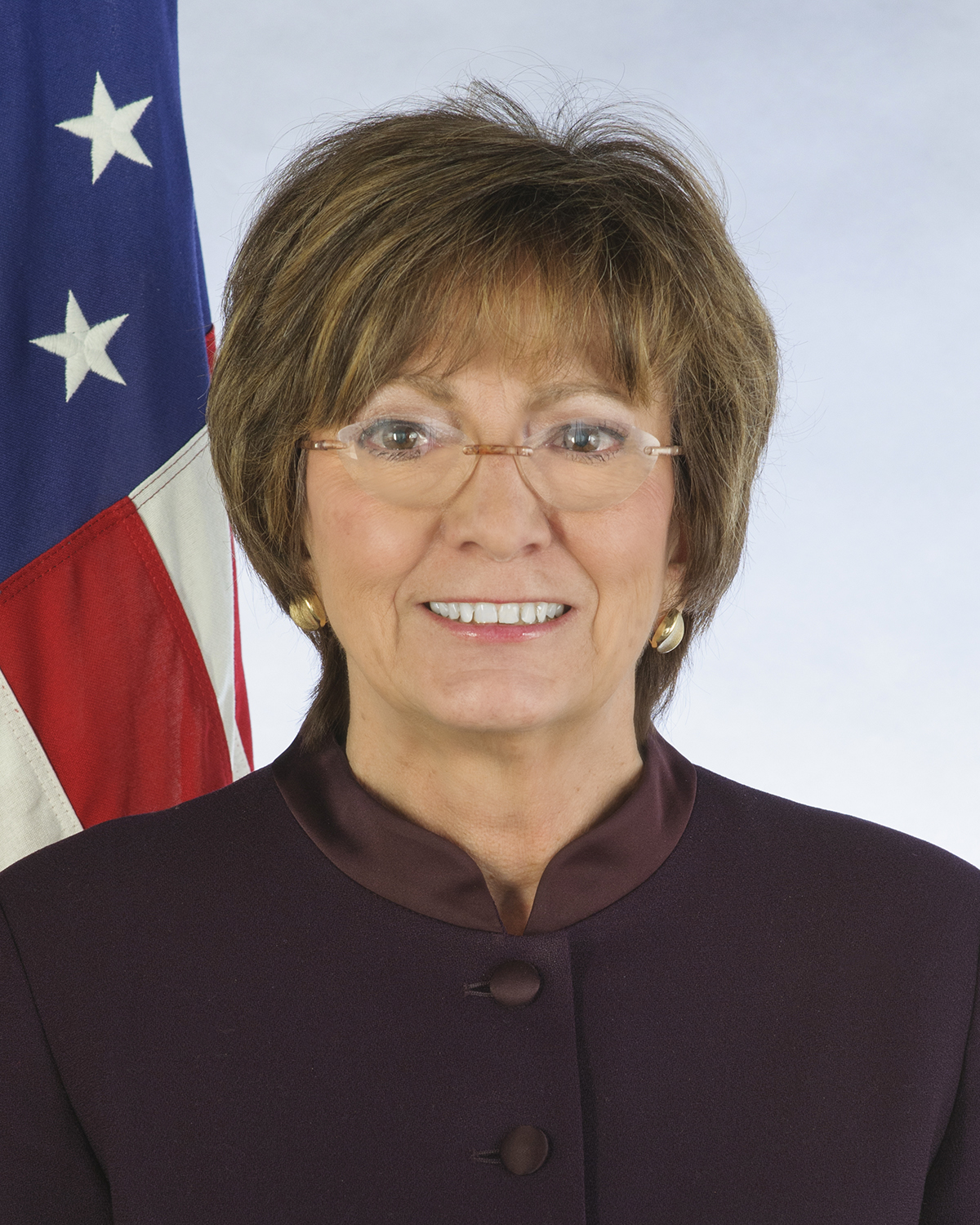

11th United States Ambassador to Antigua and Barbuda
- In office February 12, 2016 – December 27, 2023
- President: Barack Obama; Donald Trump; Joe Biden
- Preceded by: Larry Leon Palmer
- Succeeded by: Roger F. Nyhus

United States Ambassador to Barbados
- In office February 1, 2016 – December 27, 2023
- President: Barack Obama; Donald Trump; Joe Biden
- Preceded by: Larry Leon Palmer
- Succeeded by: Roger F. Nyhus

United States Ambassador to Dominica
- In office March 2, 2016 – December 27, 2023
- President: Barack Obama; Donald Trump; Joe Biden
- Preceded by: Larry Leon Palmer
- Succeeded by: Roger F. Nyhus

United States Ambassador to Grenada
- In office February 3, 2016 – December 27, 2023
- President: Barack Obama; Donald Trump; Joe Biden
- Preceded by: Larry Leon Palmer
- Succeeded by: Roger F. Nyhus

United States Ambassador to Saint Kitts and Nevis
- In office February 1, 2016 – December 27, 2023
- President: Barack Obama; Donald Trump; Joe Biden
- Preceded by: Larry Leon Palmer
- Succeeded by: Roger F. Nyhus

United States Ambassador to Saint Lucia
- In office February 1, 2016 – December 27, 2023
- President: Barack Obama; Donald Trump; Joe Biden
- Preceded by: Larry Leon Palmer
- Succeeded by: Roger F. Nyhus

United States Ambassador to Saint Vincent and the Grenadines
- In office February 1, 2016 – December 27, 2023
- President: Barack Obama; Donald Trump; Joe Biden
- Preceded by: Larry Leon Palmer
- Succeeded by: Roger F. Nyhus

Special Representative to the Organisation of Eastern Caribbean States
- In office February 1, 2016 – December 27, 2023
- President: Barack Obama; Donald Trump; Joe Biden
- Preceded by: Larry Leon Palmer
- Succeeded by: Roger F. Nyhus

Personal details
- Born: October 22, 1949 (age 76)
- Education: State University of New York at Oneonta (BA); Virginia Tech (MBA)

Linda Swartz Taglialatela (born October 22, 1949) is a diplomat and she was United States Ambassador to Barbados, the Eastern Caribbean, and the OECS. She was nominated by President Barack Obama and confirmed by the Senate on December 9, 2015. On February 1, 2016, she presented her credentials to Sir Elliott Belgrave, the then Governor-General of Barbados.

== Early life and education ==
Taglialatela was born Linda Swartz to Anne and Leon E. Swartz, a veteran and I.B.M. employee. She grew up in Broome County, New York. In 1967 she graduated from Vestal High School. She completed her undergraduate studies in 1971 at the State University of New York at Oneonta, where she was awarded a B.A. in economics. She earned her M.B.A. from Virginia Tech.

== Career ==
Taglialatela began a career in the public sector in 1973 as a management analyst at the Government Accountability Office. She joined the Foreign Service in 1979. As part of her assignment in the Office of the Inspector General, she inspected dozens of embassies and consulates.

In 1987, Taglialatela accepted an assignment at the embassy in Berne, Switzerland. Two years later, she returned to Washington, D.C. to join the Office of Resource Management and Organization Analysis. In 2002 she became Deputy Assistant Secretary of State in the Bureau of Human Resources.

In 2016, she began her role as ambassador to Antigua and Barbuda, Barbados, Dominica, Grenada, Saint Kitts and Nevis, Saint Lucia, and Saint Vincent and the Grenadines. By March 2016 she had begun touring her region and presenting her credentials.

== See also ==
- List of current ambassadors of the United States

Diplomatic posts
Preceded by Larry Palmer	United States Ambassador to Barbados and the Eastern Caribbean	Succeeded by Roger F. Nyhus
Preceded by Larry Palmer	Special Representative to the Organisation of Eastern Caribbean States; 2016–2023	Succeeded by Roger F. Nyhus
Preceded by Larry Palmer	United States Ambassador to Barbados; 2016–2023	Succeeded by Roger F. Nyhus
Preceded by Larry Palmer	United States Ambassador to Dominica; 2016–2023	Succeeded by Roger F. Nyhus
Preceded by Larry Palmer	United States Ambassador to Saint Lucia; 2016–2023	Succeeded by Roger F. Nyhus
Preceded by Larry Palmer	United States Ambassador to Saint Vincent and the Grenadines; 2016–2023	Succeeded by Roger F. Nyhus
Preceded by Larry Palmer	United States Ambassador to Antigua and Barbuda; 2016–2023	Succeeded by Roger F. Nyhus
Preceded by Larry Palmer	United States Ambassador to Saint Kitts and Nevis; 2016–2023	Succeeded by Roger F. Nyhus
Preceded by Larry Palmer	United States Ambassador to Grenada; 2016–2023	Succeeded by Roger F. Nyhus
