= Edward Morgan Rowell =

American diplomat (1931–2022)

Edward Morgan Rowell (October 13, 1931 – April 14, 2022) was an American diplomat who was a 38-year veteran of the US Foreign Service, Ambassador to Bolivia, Luxembourg, and Portugal, and Deputy Principal Assistant Secretary of State for Consular Affairs.

Rowell was born in Oakland, California on October 13, 1931. His bachelor's degree was from Yale University, while he did graduate work in history at Stanford University and completed the Sloan Executive Program at Stanford Graduate School of Business.

Rowell died on April 14, 2022, at the age of 90.
