= The Thomas Jefferson Program in Public Policy =

The Thomas Jefferson Program in Public Policy is a graduate and undergraduate program at the College of William and Mary, founded in 1987. It enrolled its first class of graduate students in 1991. It is among the College's most interdisciplinary and collaborative programs with many students graduating with a joint degree in public policy and another specialty area, such as business (M.P.P./M.B.A.), law (M.P.P./J.D.), marine science (M.P.P./M.S.), or operations research (M.P.P./M.S. - Computational Operations Research). Most public policy classes take place in Tyler Hall, now renamed Chancellors Hall. The College of William and Mary itself was chartered on February 8, 1693, by King William III and Queen Mary II as the second college in the American colonies.

== Overview ==
The Thomas Jefferson Program in Public Policy was designed to address what the National Commission on the Public Service identified as the "quiet crises" in government—the need "to attract, develop, and retain professionals of the highest caliber." Students who graduate from the Thomas Jefferson Program will have a knowledge of economics, statistics, politics, law, ethics, and substantive policy domains that will equip them to be effective participants in the policy process, whether in government agencies, non-profit organizations, or private sector firms.

The current Director of the program is Dr. Eric Jensen, who received his Ph.D. in Economics from the University of Michigan in 1982 . He specializes in population economics and applied econometrics. The Assistant Director of the program is Elaine McBeth, who received her Ph.D. from the University of Virginia in 1987. Professor McBeth has been at the College since 1988 and became Associate Director of the Thomas Jefferson Program in Public Policy in 1993. Her teaching interests include monetary theory and policy, financial market regulation, mathematical economics and stabilization policy.

=== Graduate program ===
The two-year master's degree (MPP) program is designed to prepare students for career placement at the strategic levels of public policy, both in the public sector and in private sector firms such as regulated industries and consulting firms with government clients. It is limited to 25 new students each fall. Four program areas are offered, with a strong overall emphasis on the applied and analytical skills leading to career placement at the strategic levels of public policy. The TJPPP program is heavily quantitative, so well-suited students often hold backgrounds in mathematics, economics or statistics.

=== Undergraduate program ===
Students pursuing the undergraduate major study economics, statistics, politics, law, ethics, and policy domains. This grounding is preparation for further study at the graduate level and for participating effectively in the policy process at government agencies, nonprofit organizations, and private sector firms.

== Master's program requirements ==
=== Required classes ===
First year MPP students must take or test out of the following classes:

- Mathematics and Public Policy
- Quantitative Analysis I
- Law and Public Policy
- The Political Environment
- Advanced Microeconomics
- Quantitative Analysis II (Econometrics)
- Benefit-Cost Analysis
- Public Management

Second year MPP students must take the following classes:

- Policy Research Seminar
- Ethics and Public Policy
- A law class of the student's choosing, done in conjunction with the William & Mary Law School.

=== Summer internship ===
During the summer between students' first and second years, they are required to complete a ten-week internship. Students are expected to obtain an internship within their area of interest and gain relevant work experience.

Some recent internship placements include:

- Department of Health and Human Services
- Lockheed Martin
- Deloitte and Touche
- Federal Bureau of Investigation
- James City County
- Project on National Security Reform
- American Association for the Advancement of Science
- Government Accountability Office
- U.S. Coast Guard
- Department of State
- Red Cross

=== Washington Policy Dialogues ===
Two to three times per semester, a small number of TJPPP students go to Washington, DC to hear a set of speakers arranged by the program. The event lasts one day, usually Fridays, and two to three different speakers are heard; all of whom are relevant to a single policy area (education, national security, etc.). The meetings are small and give students opportunity to ask questions about the policy area. Students are required to attend one dialogue per year.

=== Washington Program ===
During the Fall Semester of the first year, students take a three-day-long trip to Washington, DC. Students learn primarily about various professional opportunities that await them upon graduation.

=== Policy research seminar ===
Students must complete a large policy research project in their third semester in order to graduate. Students are placed into groups with similar policy interests. The project is client driven, so students work with an established member of the policy community to draft a report and present it to multiple audiences.

== William & Mary Policy Review ==
The William & Mary Policy Review is a student-run, peer-reviewed academic journal at The College of William & Mary's Thomas Jefferson Program in Public Policy.
