= McCallie =

McCallie is a surname. Notable people with the surname include:

- Joanne P. McCallie (born 1965), American women's basketball coach
- Marshall Fletcher McCallie (born 1945), former US ambassador to Namibia

== See also ==
- The McCallie School, boys' preparatory school in Chattanooga, Tennessee
