= Turhan Mildon =

Turkish businessman

- Mildon in 2023
- Born: c. 1997 – c. 2000 (Note: The Africa Report gave Mildon's age as 27 in September 2024.); Turkey
- Occupation: Businessman
- Known for: Kinshasa Financial Center
- Title: Chairman, Milvest; Chief executive, Miller Holding (Note: Sources differ on his title at Miller Holding. The company's own 2023 announcement and TRT Afrika call him chairman; The Africa Report described him in 2024 as managing director; and Middle East Eye calls him chief executive.)
- Spouse: Alina Habba (m. 2026)
- Parent: Mert Mildon
- Relatives: Muhsin Turhan Mildon (grandfather)
- Awards: Turkey-Africa Business World Award (2023)

Turhan Mildon (born c. 1997 – c. 2000) is a Turkish businessman and third-generation executive of Miller Holding, the family conglomerate founded by his grandfather in Gelibolu in 1967. He chairs Milvest, the group's construction and infrastructure arm, and has been described as Miller Holding's chief executive. Mildon is best known for spearheading the group's expansion into sub-Saharan Africa, particularly the Democratic Republic of the Congo (DRC), where Milvest designed and built the US$290 million Kinshasa Financial Center, inaugurated by President Félix Tshisekedi in December 2023.

Under his leadership, Miller Holding reported contract volume of about US$3 billion across 17 countries in Central and West Africa by 2023, the year President Recep Tayyip Erdoğan presented him with the Turkey-Africa Business World Award at a forum the group headlined as the main sponsor. His interests also include mining and building materials and, more recently, defense infrastructure, including a contract to build a drone launch base for the Congolese armed forces in Kisangani. Mildon attracted international attention in 2026 for his marriage to Alina Habba, a former counselor to President Donald Trump.

== Early life and family ==
Mildon comes from a business family rooted in Gelibolu (Gallipoli) in Turkey's Çanakkale Province. His grandfather and namesake, Muhsin Turhan Mildon (1946–2011), graduated from the Academy of Commercial Sciences and founded Miller Oto Ticaret ve Sanayi in Gelibolu in 1967, selling automotive spare parts and Goodyear tires. In 1975, the business expanded into fuel retailing with a Petrol Ofisi station, and in 1986 it became the regional main dealer for Tofaş and Fiat vehicles. The elder Mildon also served two terms as mayor of Gelibolu, from 1984 to 1994.

After the founder's death in 2011, leadership passed to Turhan's father, Mert Mildon (born 1975), who had joined the company in 1997 and later expanded it into car rental, shipping, and, beginning in 2012, construction. Mert Mildon also decided in 2011 to take the group into African markets.

== Business career ==
=== Miller Holding and Milvest ===
Miller Holding describes itself as active in construction, energy, mining, maritime transport, automotive retail, and aviation, and says it trades with 105 countries. According to Mildon, the group's African expansion began in Senegal after banker Mansour Kama, then head of the country's national employers' confederation, introduced his father to Macky Sall. The group has since operated in Ghana, Liberia, and Tanzania, but the DRC became its main African market. Mildon has said that Erdoğan personally introduced him to Tshisekedi during the Congolese president's official visit to Turkey, after which Tshisekedi invited him to Kinshasa in 2021.

Mildon took charge of the African business as chairman of Milvest and, by 2024, was reportedly spending about half of each month on the continent, including roughly ten days in Kinshasa. By October 2023, the holding reported a cumulative contract volume of about US$3 billion across 17 countries in Central and West Africa, identifying the DRC as its continental growth hub.

Mildon has emphasized local content as a core business principle. He has said he helped establish seven or eight Congolese construction companies as Milvest subcontractors, one of which grew from ten employees to about 200. He also said he had invested roughly US$500 million directly in the DRC outside government contracts and had not repatriated any money from the country.

=== Kinshasa Financial Center ===
Mildon's signature project is the Kinshasa Financial Center (Centre financier de Kinshasa) in the Gombe district of the Congolese capital, where Milvest handled both the design and construction. Work began in February 2022, the month Erdoğan made a state visit to the DRC, and the foundation stone was laid that June.

Built in about 18 months, the 165,000 m^{2} complex comprises eleven buildings, including a 19-story office tower, a congress center with seating for 3,000, and a 240-room hotel developed by Milvest as a private investment. It houses the Ministry of Finance and Budget and related institutions and was designed to accommodate about 5,000 workers; Miller Holding presented it as the largest congress and financial center in Central Africa. At a site briefing in September 2023, Mildon said the project employed about 3,000 people, including 1,800 Congolese workers.

Tshisekedi inaugurated the center on December 19, 2023, on the eve of the country's general election, at a reported cost of US$290 million.

=== Other projects in the DRC ===
The financial center opened a pipeline of additional work in Kinshasa. Milvest was reported to be involved in the reconstruction and expansion of N'djili International Airport, a US$1.2 billion partnership, as well as a planned urban cable car, for which it contracted the French specialist Poma.

Milvest is also the contractor for the Kinshasa Arena, a 20,000-seat multipurpose indoor venue on a 55,000 m^{2} site beside the Stade des Martyrs, which Mildon has described as Africa's largest indoor sports facility. Construction began in October 2023; after a pause, work resumed in December 2024, when Mildon firmly committed to Congolese authorities that the venue would be delivered by the end of September 2025.

In building materials, Mildon has said that Milvest was the first company in sub-Saharan Africa to manufacture façade plaster from Congo River sand. He has also cited investments of about US$150 million in a concrete plant, quarry, and related facilities, plus US$100 million in machinery. The Congolese news site Ouragan questioned these figures, stating that it found no confirmation from officials other than Nicolas Kazadi and no trace of funds transferred from Miller Holding or Milvest Extérieur to the country.

=== Mining ===
Mildon has said the group operates copper, cobalt and gold mines in the DRC alongside aggregate and limestone quarries, a gold mine in Liberia, and small-scale gold and coal exploration in Tanzania.

=== Defense infrastructure ===
In March 2026, Africa Intelligence reported that Mildon was expanding into defense, with Milvest overseeing construction of a drone launch base in Kisangani. The contract with the Armed Forces of the Democratic Republic of the Congo, valued at approximately US$67 million, was described by the business analysis site Uchumi360 as a significant expansion of his portfolio and as bringing another foreign partner into the DRC's security arrangements.

=== Venezuela ===
Mildon also runs a cement business in Venezuela. He told Middle East Eye that in 2025 his company, Vancement, reached a profit-sharing agreement with the Venezuelan government to revive ten state-owned cement plants. The Correspondent reported in September 2026 that he maintains ties to the country's interim president, Delcy Rodríguez.

== Recognition ==
In October 2023, Miller Holding was the main sponsor of the fourth Turkey-Africa Business and Economic Forum (TABEF) in Istanbul, hosted by Turkey's Ministry of Trade, the Foreign Economic Relations Board (DEİK), and the African Union. The forum attracted nearly 4,000 businesspeople, about half from Africa, and approximately 30 ministers.

At the forum, Erdoğan and Azali Assoumani, President of the Comoros, presented Mildon with the Turkey-Africa Business World Award, an honor dubbed "Africa's best," for developing projects across the continent and helping expand trade with it. He summarized his outlook: "For determined companies that make enough effort, no market is difficult."

== Personal life ==
Mildon divides his time between Turkey and Africa. In September 2026, Mildon married Alina Habba, an American lawyer who previously served as counselor to President Trump and as acting U.S. Attorney for the District of New Jersey. The couple's high-profile wedding at the Waldorf Astoria New York was attended by dignitaries in town for the opening of the United Nations General Assembly, and entertainment included a performance by Grammy Award-winning rapper Nelly.

The New York Times published an article October 31, 2026 calling into question aspects of Turhan Mildon’s public statements. saying he, “presents himself as a 29-year-old billionaire with ties to global leaders. His story has inconsistencies.”

== See also ==
- Democratic Republic of the Congo–Turkey relations
- Kinshasa Arena
