= Anthony Watkins =

German-American basketball player

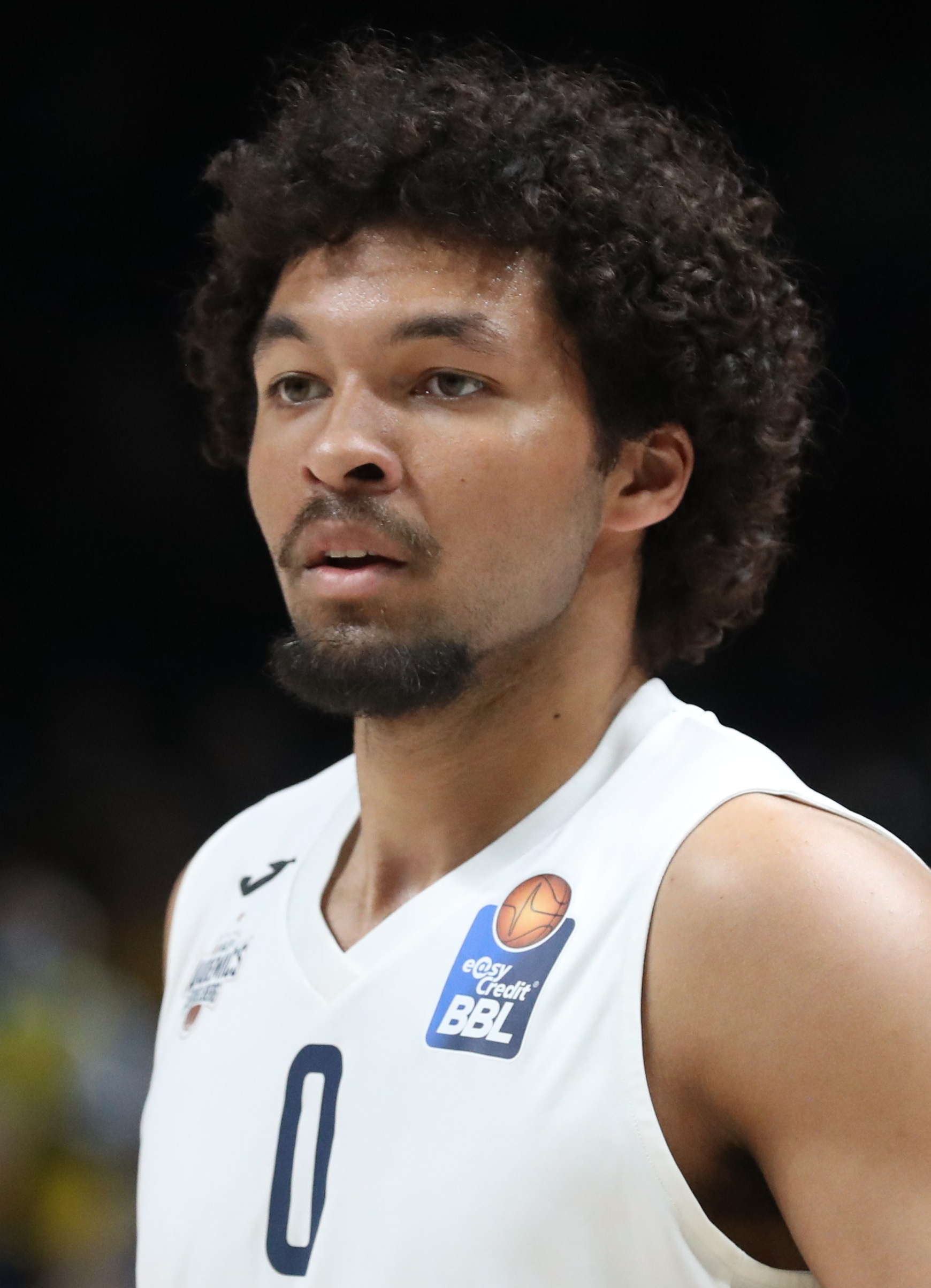
- Watkins with Heidelberg in 2022

SSV Lokomotive Bernau
- Position: Point guard

Personal information
- Born: 31 October 2000 (age 26) Heidelberg, Germany
- Listed height: 1.94 m (6 ft 4 in)
- Listed weight: 94 kg (207 lb)

Career information
- High school: The McCallie School (Chattanooga, Tennessee)
- Playing career: 2019–present

Career history
- 2019: Basketball Löwen Erfurt
- 2019–2020: Gießen Pointers
- 2020–2021: Basketball Löwen Braunschweig
- 2021–2022: MLP Academics Heidelberg
- 2022–2023: BG Hagen
- 2023–2024: Artland Dragons
- 2024–2025: TSV Neustadt
- 2025–present: SSV Lokomotive Bernau

Anthony Watkins (born 31 October 2000) is a German-American professional basketball player for SSV Lokomotive Bernau of the German ProB. After graduating from The McCallie School in Chattanooga, Tennessee in 2019, Watkins chose to bypass college in order to pursue professional basketball in Germany before the 2020 NBA draft.

== Early life and career ==
Watkins grew up in the United States and Germany and is bilingual. He started to pursue basketball from his early childhood on, at the age of 5. Watkins continued playing both school-organized basketball in middle and high school, as well as AAU basketball. At Lakeview Middle School, Watkins holds the record of most points scored in a single game with 47 points in three quarters' time. Watkins then became a member of the varsity basketball team at The McCallie School. He led his team as captain in his senior year of high school during which he ranked second in scoring for the Blue Tornado, while also standing second in field goal percentage and blocked shots. Watkins was selected to the 2019 Division II-AA East-Middle All-Region and BCAT All-Stars East teams.

== Professional career ==
Watkins signed his first professional contract with the Basketball Löwen Erfurt of the German third tier ProB in August 2019, right after graduating from The McCallie School. Due to being classified as an EU-import player, despite Watkins' dual citizenship, he played limited minutes in 10 games with the Basketball Löwen Erfurt, averaging 3.6 points per contest. In January 2020, Watkins, therefore, joined the Regionalliga side Gießen Pointers (fourth German division) with a debut of 22 points and eight rebounds. He finished the season, which ended prematurely due to the COVID-19 pandemic, averaging 9 points, 4.1 rebounds and 1.1 assists per game, while shooting 53 percent from the field and 66.7 percent from behind the 3-point line in nine games. Under the Collective Bargaining Agreement between the NBA and the National Basketball Players Association, Watkins' professional status and the fact that he played his first professional game before January 1, 2020, entered him in the 2020 NBA draft. He was not selected by any NBA team.

On 28 August 2020, Watkins signed with the Basketball Löwen Braunschweig of the Basketball Bundesliga, with a double license, in order to also assist Braunschweig's Regionalliga team SG Braunschweig. He made his debut for the Basketball Löwen team in the Bundesliga on December 13, 2020.

On July 14, 2021, he signed with MLP Academics Heidelberg of the Basketball Bundesliga. His playing time was limited to no more than 1:33 minutes per game during the 2021-2022 Bundesliga season.

In 2022-23, Watkins emerged as a major contributor for BG Hagen, averaging a team-high 21.4 points per outing for the fourth-tier Regionalliga outfit. On June 30, 2023, he put pen to paper on a contract with the Artland Dragons of the German second-tier ProA league. Watkins parted company with the Artland side on December 6, 2024. He then signed with German third-division team TSV Neustadt. Watkins was Neustadt's second leading scorer (12.8 points per contest) during the 2024-25 season which in relegation from the ProB league.

In September 2025, he inked a deal with German ProB side SSV Lokomotive Bernau.

== National team career ==
Watkins was selected to the expanded roster of the U20 German National Team in 2019 and also participated in the U18 training camp in 2018.
