= Roger A. McGuire =

American diplomat

Roger Alan McGuire (July 1, 1943 – January 24, 2005) was the United States Ambassador Extraordinary and Plenipotentiary to Guinea-Bissau from October 14, 1992 to August 28, 1995. He was appointed to the post by President George H. W. Bush on June 15, 1992.

== Early life ==
McGuire was born in Troy, Ohio and graduated from Beloit College in 1965. While at Beloit he studied in Switzerland and England and was a member of Sigma Pi fraternity. He then earned his Master of Arts degree from the University of Wisconsin 1967.

== Career ==
McGuire joined the State Department's Foreign Service in 1967. His career began in Vietnam, where he received an award for heroism. During his career, his postings included Portugal, Botswana, Mozambique, Paraguay, and Australia. He served in the State Department’s Office of West African Affairs twice. He was Deputy Director of the Office from 1986 to 1988. He spent a year on Capitol Hill with the Congressional Fellowship program. He also was on the Board of Examiners of the Foreign Service twice. He was Deputy Examiner for the Board, which conducts the Civil service entrance examination, from 1988 to 1990.

From 1983 to 1986 he was the Political Officer at the American Embassy in Lusaka, Zambia.

He was in charge of the United States liaison office in Windhoek during Namibia's transition to independence in 1990. On March 21, 1990 McGuire opened the U.S. Embassy in Namibia where he was Chargé d'Affaires ad interim. He was the director of the Embassy until Genta H. Holmes was appointed as ambassador in August 1990.

He won three Superior Honor Awards from the State Department. His third award was in 1991 for his "lasting contribution to democracy and self-determination in Africa."

After Namibia, he became the Principal Officer at the American Consulate in Porto Alegre, Brazil from 1990 to 1992. He was then assigned to Guinea-Bissau.

== Personal life ==
After retiring in 1997, he accompanied his wife, Harriet Cooke McGuire, for another assignment to Mozambique. At the time she was a career Foreign Service officer with the U.S. Information Agency.

He and Harriet were married for thirty-five years and had two daughters, Sara and Casey. He was living in Alexandria, Virginia when he died.

Diplomatic posts
Preceded by William Ludwig Jacobsen	United States Ambassador to Guinea-Bissau; 1992–1995	Succeeded by Peggy Blackford
