= Strategic Investment Fund of the Democratic Republic of the Congo =

Strategic investment fund of the DR Congo

Strategic Investment Fund
- Romanized name: Fonds d'investissement stratégique
- Type: Strategic investment fund
- Industry: Development finance; infrastructure development; investment management; public finance; real estate
- Founded: 15 August 2025; 13 months ago
- Headquarters: Kinshasa, Democratic Republic of the Congo
- Key people: Clavin Kabamba Nsupi (Chairman of the Board of Directors); Émile Donatien Luhahi Osumba (Director General); Nina Masanga Muamba (Deputy Director General)
- Owner: Government of the Democratic Republic of the Congo

The Strategic Investment Fund of the Democratic Republic of the Congo (French: Fonds d'investissement stratégique de la République démocratique du Congo; FIS-RDC) is a state-owned strategic investment fund established in 2025 by the Ministry of Finance to mobilize financing, manage state assets, and support long-term economic development.

Its mandate extends beyond that of a conventional sovereign wealth fund to include development finance, management of public assets, and fiduciary oversight of government investment projects.

== History ==
The idea of a strategic investment fund emerged during Finance Minister Nicolas Kazadi's tenure, when, on 10 November 2023, he presented a proposal to the Council of Ministers for the creation of a national investment fund to manage public assets and finance long-term development projects. The proposal stated that the fund would manage major state-owned real estate assets, including the Kinshasa Financial Center and Kinshasa Convention Center after completion. The institution was planned to identify investment opportunities, co-invest with domestic and international investors, and participate directly in projects deemed strategic for national development. The proposed legal structure was a single-shareholder limited company (société anonyme unipersonnelle) classified as a state-owned commercial enterprise (société commerciale du portefeuille de l'État) under the Ministry of Finance.

The government initially planned a US$25 million state endowment to establish the fund's initial investment capacity of approximately $20 million and support its first investments. The project followed financing agreements signed in 2022 during Turkish President Recep Tayyip Erdoğan's visit to the DRC with President Félix Tshisekedi. The Kinshasa Financial Center was designed as a government and business complex featuring government offices, a five-star 240-room hotel, around 10,000 office spaces, and a 3,000-person convention center, with the fund expected to manage and maximize the value of these assets.

On 15 August 2025, the Council of Ministers adopted a draft decree establishing the legal status, organization, and operations of the Strategic Investment Fund of the Democratic Republic of the Congo (Fonds d'investissement stratégique de la République démocratique du Congo; FIS-RDC). Finance Minister Doudou Roussel Fwamba Likunde Li-Botayi presented the decree at a Council meeting chaired by President Félix Tshisekedi at the African Union City complex. The government stated that the fund would mobilize financing to support implementation of the national development strategy, promote territorial development, diversify the economy, and strengthen economic sovereignty.

== Operations and organization ==
=== Mandate ===
The founding decree assigns the FIS-RDC the following responsibilities:

- Mobilize financing and invest in strategic assets — including infrastructure, real estate, energy, technology, agriculture, and industry — to support sustainable economic development and the government's investment program.
- Manage and maximize the value of designated public assets by integrating them into investment projects.
- Ensure transparent governance of public funds through best practices, environmental and social standards, and financial accountability.
- Promote co-investment with domestic and international institutional and private-sector partners to expand investment capacity and optimize asset returns.
- Support national development by facilitating access to international financing and supporting strategic initiatives that promote growth, job creation, and private-sector development.
- Act as a fiduciary manager for public investment projects assigned by the government, financing them through its resources or external funding in accordance with applicable regulations.

=== Governance ===
The FIS-RDC is governed by a board of directors and an executive team led by a director general. The first board of directors was appointed by presidential ordinance on 28 February 2026, and it has five members and is chaired by Clavin Kabamba Nsupi. Executive management is led by Director General Émile Donatien Luhahi Osumba, with Nina Masanga Muamba serving as deputy director general.
