= List of ambassadors of the United States to Guinea-Bissau =

Ambassador of the United States to Guinea-Bissau
- Seal of the United States Department of State

- Flag of a United States ambassador

- Incumbent; Jennifer Davis-Paguada; Chargé d'affaires since January 20, 2026
- Nominator: The president of the United States
- Appointer: The president; with Senate advice and consent
- Inaugural holder: Dean Curran as Chargé d'Affaires ad interim
- Formation: June 30, 1976
- Website: U.S. Embassy - Dakar

The United States ambassador to Guinea-Bissau is the official representative of the president of the United States to the head of state of Guinea-Bissau. The U.S. ambassador to Senegal is concurrently commissioned to Senegal and Guinea-Bissau.

Until 1974, Guinea-Bissau had been a colony of the Portuguese Empire as Portuguese Guinea. After a period of revolutionary warfare, Guinea-Bissau unilaterally declared its independence on September 24, 1973. Following the April 1974 Carnation Revolution in Portugal, it granted independence to Guinea-Bissau on September 10, 1974. The United States recognized the Republic of Guinea-Bissau on the same day. The U.S. Embassy Bissau was established on June 30, 1976, with Dean Curran as Chargé d'Affaires ad interim.

The first three ambassadors to Guinea-Bissau were concurrently commissioned to Cape Verde while resident in Bissau. From 1983 until 1998, U.S. ambassadors were solely commissioned to Guinea-Bissau. In 1998 the U.S. embassy in Bissau was closed, and there has been no U.S. embassy in Bissau since then. Since 2002, the U.S. ambassador to Senegal has also been commissioned as the ambassador to Guinea-Bissau, while resident in Dakar.

== Ambassadors and chiefs of mission ==
Name	Title	Appointed	Presented credentials	Terminated mission
Melissa F. Wells - Career FSO	Ambassador Extraordinary and Plenipotentiary	September 16, 1976	November 29, 1976	March 29, 1977
Edward Marks - Career FSO	Ambassador Extraordinary and Plenipotentiary	September 16, 1977	October 31, 1977	July 11, 1980
Peter Jon de Vos - Career FSO	Ambassador Extraordinary and Plenipotentiary	August 27, 1980	September 22, 1980	March 30, 1983
Wesley Egan - Career FSO	Ambassador Extraordinary and Plenipotentiary	March 18, 1983	May 12, 1983	January 7, 1985
Barbara C. Maslak	Chargé d'Affaires ad interim	January 1985	Unknown	August 1986
John Dale Blacken - Career FSO	Ambassador Extraordinary and Plenipotentiary	June 16, 1986	August 27, 1986	September 29, 1989
William Ludwig Jacobsen - Career FSO	Ambassador Extraordinary and Plenipotentiary	October 10, 1989	November 13, 1989	August 25, 1992
Roger A. McGuire - Career FSO	Ambassador Extraordinary and Plenipotentiary	June 15, 1992	October 14, 1992	August 28, 1995
Peggy Blackford - Career FSO	Ambassador Extraordinary and Plenipotentiary	October 3, 1995	November 4, 1995	June 14, 1998
Embassy suspended operations from 1998 to 2002.
Richard Allan Roth - Career FSO	Ambassador Extraordinary and Plenipotentiary	November 15, 2002	February 13, 2004	Left Dakar, August 4, 2005
Janice L. Jacobs - Career FSO	Ambassador Extraordinary and Plenipotentiary	February 21, 2006	May 9, 2006	Left Dakar, July 15, 2007
Marcia Bernicat - Career FSO	Ambassador Extraordinary and Plenipotentiary	June 16, 2008	November 6, 2008	July 15, 2011
Robert T. Yamate	Chargé d'Affaires ad interim	July 15, 2011	Unknown	August 2011
Lewis A. Lukens – Career FSO	Ambassador Extraordinary and Plenipotentiary	July 11, 2011	October 19, 2011	June 4, 2014
James P. Zumwalt – Career FSO	Ambassador Extraordinary and Plenipotentiary	February 3, 2015	March 10, 2015	January 19, 2017
Tulinabo S. Mushingi – Career FSO	Ambassador Extraordinary and Plenipotentiary	May 19, 2017	August 4, 2017	February 1, 2022
Michael A. Raynor – Career FSO	Ambassador Extraordinary and Plenipotentiary	December 18, 2021	April 20, 2022	January 15, 2026

== See also ==
- Guinea-Bissau – United States relations
- Foreign relations of Guinea-Bissau
- Ambassadors of the United States
