= Alina Habba =

American attorney (born 1984)

Alina Habba Mildon
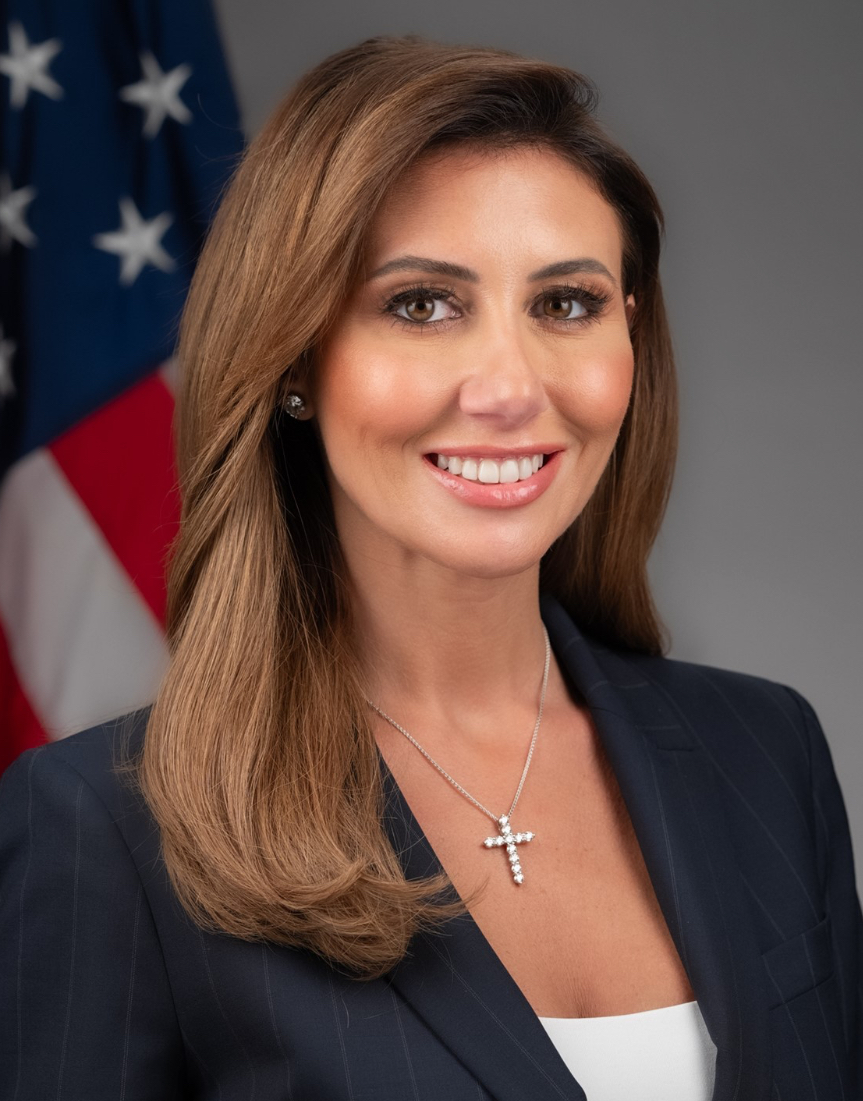
- Official portrait, 2025

Senior Advisor to the Attorney General for U.S. Attorneys
- Incumbent
- Assumed office December 8, 2025
- Preceded by: Position established

Acting United States Attorney for the District of New Jersey
- De facto, unlawful (Note: On December 1, 2025, the U.S. Court of Appeals for the Third Circuit ruled that the Trump Administration unlawfully appointed Habba to her position, saying that "Habba is not the Acting U.S. Attorney for the District of New Jersey".)
- In office July 24, 2025 – December 8, 2025
- President: Donald Trump
- Preceded by: Herself (interim)
- Succeeded by: Robert Frazer
- Interim; March 28, 2025 – July 24, 2025
- President: Donald Trump
- Preceded by: John Giordano
- Succeeded by: Herself

Counselor to the President
- In office January 20, 2025 – March 28, 2025 (Note: Habba was not listed in the White House's Annual Report to Congress on White House Personnel dated July 1, 2025.)
- President: Donald Trump
- Preceded by: Steve Ricchetti

Personal details
- Born: Alina Saad Habba; March 25, 1984 (age 42) Summit, New Jersey, U.S.
- Party: Republican
- Spouses: Matthew Eyet (m. 2011; div. 2019); Gregg Reuben (m. 2020; div. 2026); Turhan Mildon (m. 2026)
- Children: 2
- Education: Lehigh University (BA); Widener University (JD)

Alina Saad Habba Mildon (née Habba; born March 25, 1984) is an American lawyer and political advisor who was named acting United States attorney for the District of New Jersey in July 2025, having previously served in an interim capacity from March 2025. Her July appointment was ruled unlawful in August 2025 and the ruling was upheld on appeal in December 2025. She announced her resignation from the post on December 8, 2025. A member of the Republican Party, she had been a counselor to the president from January to March 2025.

From 2021 to 2025, Habba was a legal spokesperson for President Donald Trump and as a senior advisor for MAGA, Inc., Trump's super PAC. She has been sanctioned by courts for filing frivolous lawsuits on behalf of Trump. She was also a managing partner of Habba, Madaio & Associates, a law firm based in Bedminster, New Jersey, with an office in New York City.

== Early life and education ==
Habba and her two siblings were born in Summit, New Jersey. Their parents were Chaldean Catholics who emigrated from Iraq to the United States in the early 1980s to escape persecution in their home country. Her father, Saad F. Habba, is a gastroenterologist. Habba graduated from Kent Place School in 2002. She attended Lehigh University, graduating in 2005 with a bachelor's degree in political science.

Between 2005 and 2007, Habba worked in the fashion industry in accessories production and marketing with executives at Marc Jacobs. According to her, though she enjoyed the fashion industry, she decided to attend law school for financial reasons. She obtained a Juris Doctor from the Widener University Commonwealth Law School in 2010.

== Career ==
After finishing law school, Habba was a law clerk to Eugene J. Codey Jr., then-presiding judge of the Civil Superior Court in Essex County, New Jersey, from 2010 to 2011. Habba began private practice in September 2011, when she joined as an associate at Tompkins, McGuire, Wachenfeld & Barry, LLP, where she worked from September 2011 to February 2013. From February 2013 to March 2020, she was an equity partner and the managing partner of Sandelands Eyet LLP, a seven-attorney firm formed by her then-husband in 2013. In March 2020, Habba left to start her own firm. The firm, Habba, Madaio and Associates LLP, employs five people. Along with the firm's Bedminster, New Jersey office, Habba has an office in Manhattan.

Habba is licensed to practice law in New York, New Jersey, and Connecticut. She has served as lead counsel for three cases, including a federal class action suit against a New Jersey nursing home accused of various negligent acts and consumer fraud violations. Habba has also held the position of general counsel for her second husband's parking garage company. She has represented clients in various legal cases including a student seeking a refund for college tuition after University of Bridgeport moved classes to an online format.

In July 2021, Habba represented Siggy Flicker, a former member of The Real Housewives of New Jersey who alleged that Facebook had disabled her account for wishing Melania Trump a happy birthday. Habba wrote a letter to Facebook, which Facebook appeared to ignore. Also in July 2021, Habba represented Caesar DePaço, a vitamin supplement entrepreneur, in a federal court case where she filed a lawsuit against Portuguese journalists for revealing his close connections to the far-right Chega party in Portugal.

=== Work as Trump's attorney ===
==== 2021 ====
In 2019, Habba joined the Trump National Golf Club Bedminster in New Jersey, which is an eight-minute drive from her law firm. There, she and Donald Trump became acquainted.

In a lawsuit filed in December 2023 aimed at referring Habba to the New Jersey Office of Attorney Ethics, a Trump National Golf Club Bedminster employee alleged that in the second half of 2021, Habba induced the employee into entering an illegal non-disclosure agreement when the employee intended to accuse a club manager of workplace sexual misconduct (New Jersey banned non-disclosure agreements for workplace harassment). The employee alleged that Habba tried to befriend her, encouraged the firing of the employee's lawyer, provided the non-disclosure agreement with penalties for disclosure, and warned the employee not to publicize the workplace sexual misconduct accusation; Habba responded in 2023: "I always conduct myself ethically and acted no differently in this circumstance." The club settled the lawsuit in March 2024, with the settlement agreement including a line stating that both "parties agree that Alina Habba is not a party to this release". Habba settled the lawsuit in August 2024.

Habba had never done legal work for Trump when, in September 2021, he hired her as part of his legal team, replacing several well-established lawyers who had worked for Trump for many years but had withdrawn their services, including: Marc Kasowitz, Charles Harder, Joanna Hendon, Marc Saroff Mukasey, Jay Sekulow, and Lawrence S. Rosen. Quickly after her hiring, Habba filed a $100 million lawsuit on Trump's behalf against The New York Times, three Times reporters, and Trump's niece, Mary L. Trump. Her lawsuit was dismissed by the judge for "fail[ing] as a matter of constitutional law". Habba also worked on Trump's behalf when he was sued for defamation by Summer Zervos. Trump had called Zervos a "liar" in 2017, after she accused him of kissing and groping her, without her consent, when she was a contestant on Trump's reality TV show, The Apprentice. In October 2021, Habba filed a Trump countersuit against Zervos, claiming she was trying to stifle Trump's right to free speech. Shortly thereafter, in November 2021, Zervos discontinued the lawsuit.

==== Since 2022 ====
Habba represented Trump in a legal case where he was being investigated for falsely representing the value of his assets on various Statements of Net Worth that banks required him to file annually to ensure that Trump had sufficient funds to repay their loans. She unsuccessfully appealed a court order requiring Trump and his children Ivanka, Donald Jr., and Eric to give sworn testimony about the valuations they signed for when filing those returns. New York's attorney general, Letitia James, personally questioned Trump on August 10, 2022. Habba was present during the deposition and led the defense. Trump refused to answer any questions during the four-hour deposition, pleading the United States Constitution's Fifth Amendment over 450 times.

In February 2022, Habba unsuccessfully attempted to prevent Trump from being required to give a sworn statement in an investigation led by James. On July 19, 2022, Habba was sued by a former employee, Na'Syia Drayton, who claimed Habba repeatedly sang inappropriate gangster rap and hip hop music in the office while using the N word, made racist comments, and referred to James as "that Black bitch". The lawsuit was settled out of court in September 2022. Habba had called James a "sick person" in January of the same year.

In September 2022, U.S. district court judge Donald M. Middlebrooks dismissed a 2022 suit brought by Habba for Trump against Hillary Clinton, John Podesta, Jake Sullivan, Debbie Wasserman Schultz, and numerous other public officials, private citizens, and private entities against whom Trump sought damages for alleged conduct surrounding the 2016 presidential election. Dismissing all of Trump's claims, Middlebrooks concluded that Trump's complaint was not just inadequate in any respect, but in all respects, and expressly reserved the right to consider sanctions against Trump's attorneys at a later date.

Two months after issuing that decision, Middlebrooks sanctioned Trump's four lawyers, including Habba, assessing each $50,000 in penalties plus $16,000 to cover the legal fees paid by one of the defendants. Later in January 2023, Middlebrooks ordered Trump, Habba, and her firm to pay $938,000 in legal costs for 31 defendants, including the Democratic National Committee, Hillary Clinton, and former FBI director James Comey. The judge wrote about the lawsuit brought by Habba: "No reasonable lawyer would have filed it. Intended for a political purpose, none of the counts of the amended complaint stated a cognizable legal claim." In November 2025, the United States Court of Appeals for the Eleventh Circuit rejected Habba's appeal, stating that Habba had engaged in sanctionable conduct and that many of the legal arguments were frivolous.

Habba represented Trump in a federal civil lawsuit filed by his former attorney, Michael Cohen. Cohen had been released from prison into home confinement during the coronavirus pandemic. He was re-imprisoned after promoting his book Disloyal: A Memoir and released again 16 days later after obtaining an injunction. Cohen later sued Trump and former Justice Department employees for damages. Habba filed a motion to dismiss the lawsuit with prejudice, and the lower court ruled against Cohen. In January 2024, the United States Court of Appeals for the Second Circuit upheld the lower court's decision.

Habba defended Trump's private interests in the Carroll v. Trump case, when she argued before the U.S. Court of Appeals for the Second Circuit that the Federal Tort Claims Act applies to a former U.S. president. The Second Circuit, in a decision dated September 27, 2022, agreed that Trump was an employee of the United States at the time and that the District Court must consider the applicability of the Federal Tort Claims Act to Trump's comments in that light. The Second Circuit decision did not address the merits of Trump's claim that the comments constituted executive action as the President of the United States. In December 2023, the appeals court upheld the federal judge's ruling rejecting Trump's claim of presidential immunity.

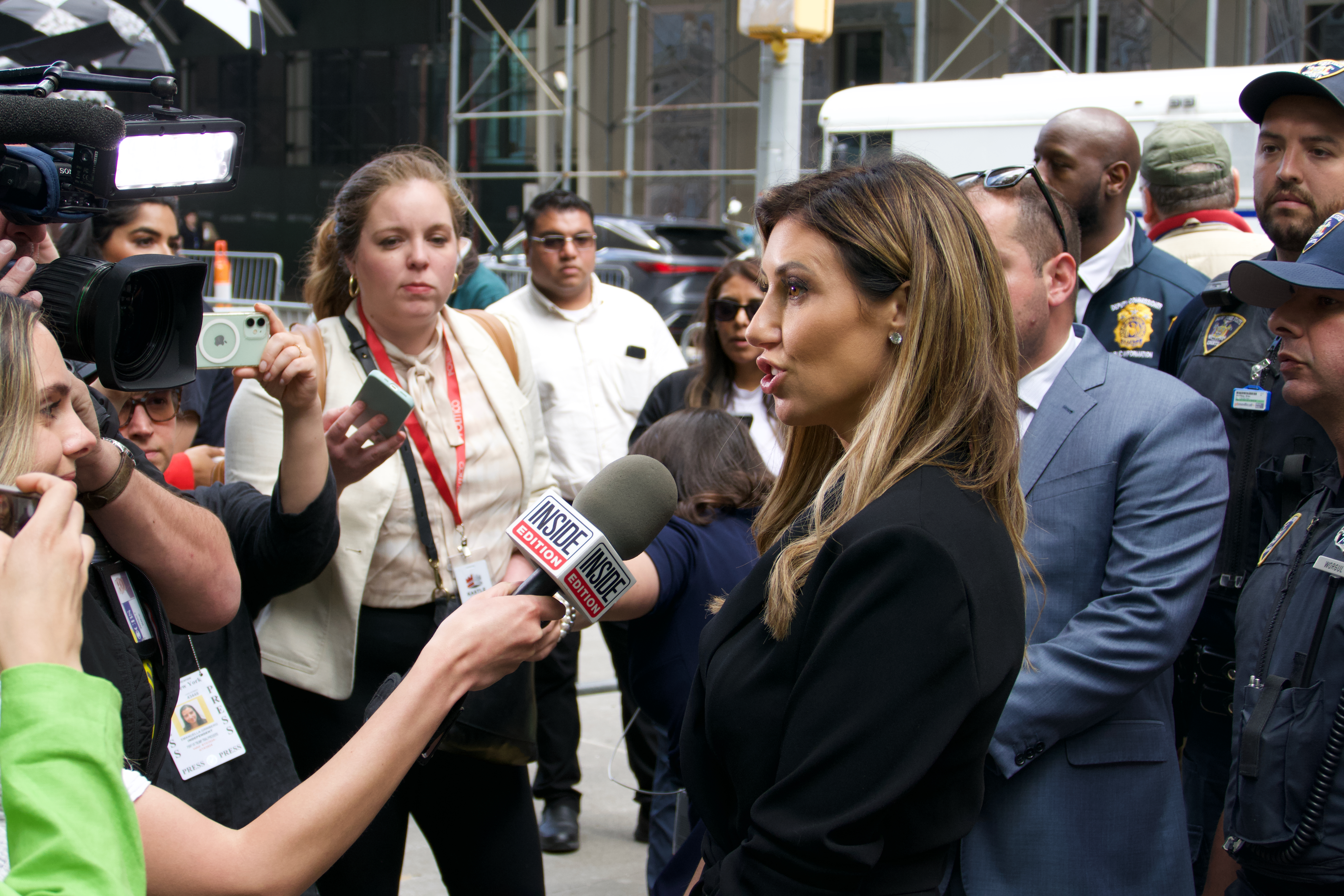
Habba talking to press on the second and final day of jury deliberation during the prosecution of Donald Trump in New York

In 2022, Trump's Save America political action committee paid Habba's firm almost $2 million in legal fees. In January 2024, Habba predicted that Associate Supreme Court Justice Brett Kavanaugh, "who the president fought for, who the president went through hell to get into place", would "step up" to support Trump's case in Trump v. Anderson, which would decide whether Trump is disqualified from ballot access per the Fourteenth Amendment. Habba disclaimed meaning that justices like Kavanaugh would rule for Trump on account of being "pro-Trump", claiming instead that they would "because they're pro-law, because they're pro-fairness". Habba served as lead attorney for the E. Jean Carroll v. Donald J. Trump trial that began on January 16, 2024. Over the course of three days, presiding federal judge Lewis Kaplan repeatedly reprimanded Habba for her methods of cross-examining Carroll and introducing evidence. A jury awarded Carroll $83.3 million in damages against Trump on January 26, 2024.

She spoke on the final night of the 2024 Republican National Convention leading up to the introduction of Trump. In August 2024, she criticized Adam Kinzinger for speaking out against Trump during the 2024 Democratic National Convention, and told him to "sit the hell down". In January 2025, Habba came under fire for appearing on a show as a guest and telling Andrew Tate, who is accused of rape, human trafficking, and other charges, that she is a "big fan". Critics have called on Trump to fire her.

In December 2024, Trump named Habba as his counselor to the president.

=== Interim U.S. attorney for the District of New Jersey ===
On March 24, 2025, Trump announced that Habba would become interim United States attorney for the District of New Jersey effective immediately following his nomination of the then interim U.S. Attorney, John Giordano, as U.S. ambassador to Namibia. Giordano continued to sign documents as U.S. attorney through March 27, and Attorney General Pamela Bondi signed Habba's appointment that day, effective March 28, the day she was sworn in.

Habba announced investigations into Phil Murphy, New Jersey's Democratic governor, and Matt Platkin, the state's attorney general. In an interview, she also said she wanted to "turn New Jersey red". After an incident at the Newark, New Jersey immigration detention facility on May 9, involving three Democratic members of New Jersey's congressional delegation and the arrest of Newark's Democratic mayor, Ras Baraka, Habba dropped the charges against Baraka and charged LaMonica McIver, one of the members of Congress, with assault. The judge who formally dismissed the charges against Baraka rebuked Habba's office for the arrest, warning against use of the office "to advance political agendas". Several Democratic politicians in New Jersey have described Habba's actions as politicizing the U.S. Attorney's office. Baraka subsequently filed a lawsuit against Habba and a Homeland Security Investigations agent involved in his arrest, alleging false arrest, malicious prosecution, and defamation.

=== Acting U.S. attorney for the District of New Jersey ===
On July 22, 2025, a panel of judges on the District Court for the District of New Jersey declined to retain Habba until a nominee is named, appointing Desiree Leigh Grace, Habba's first assistant, instead. Bondi fired Desiree Leigh Grace a few hours later. On Wednesday, July 23, 2025, Grace posted on her LinkedIn profile that she intended to assume the position the judges selected her for "in accordance with the law". On July 24, 2025, President Trump withdrew the nomination of Alina Habba, which cleared the way for her to serve in New Jersey as the U.S. attorney in an acting capacity. Days later, court activity in New Jersey involving the U.S. attorney abruptly stopped amid motions that contested Habba's continued tenure; federal statute states that a person "may not serve as an acting officer" if their nomination is submitted to the Senate, but does not clarify if that is applicable upon the withdrawal of a nomination.

On August 21, 2025, Matthew W. Brann, the chief United States district judge of the United States District Court for the Middle District of Pennsylvania, sitting by designation in the District of New Jersey, ruled that Habba's appointment was void as of July 1, 2025, and her later purported reappointment was invalid, but stayed his order pending appeal. The judge also said that Grace thus became the U.S. attorney upon appointment by the district judges on July 22, 2025, but expressed no opinion as to whether the president's purported firing of her on July 26 was valid as that was not before him.

On December 1, a three-judge panel of the United States Court of Appeals for the Third Circuit upheld Brann's ruling that Habba was not lawfully appointed and disqualified her from the position of acting U.S. attorney for New Jersey.

On December 8, she resigned as acting U.S. attorney for New Jersey. Bondi announced on X that Habba "will be continuing with the Department of Justice as Senior Advisor to the Attorney General for U.S. Attorneys" and that the department will seek further review and Habba will return to her position if the ruling is reversed.

=== Concord Partners ===
On October 20, 2026, The New York Times reported that Julio Herrera Velutini's daughter Isabela used Concord Partners, a company she established in Florida in October 2025, to hire Habba as general counsel for "$10 million a year for four years along with a range of bonuses" totaling $50 million guaranteed. Habba began working at Concord Partners on January 1, 2026 and Herrera Velutini received a pardon from U.S. president Donald Trump a few weeks later.

On November 4, 2026, she was terminated from Concord Partners for "failure to perform duties."

== Personal life ==
Habba has described herself as a devout Catholic. She is culturally an Arab-American.

Habba was married to lawyer Matthew Eyet from 2011 to 2019. They have two children, Chloe and Luke.

In 2020, she married businessman and entrepreneur Gregg Reuben; they lived in Bernardsville, New Jersey. Reuben is the CEO of Centerpark, a New York City-based parking management company. Habba had a step-child from Reuben's previous marriage. In February 2026, Habba quietly divorced Reuben and moved into a mansion in Palm Beach, Florida, close to Donald Trump's Mar-a-Lago club.

In September 2026, Habba married Turkish businessman Turhan Mildon. Their high-profile wedding at the Waldorf Astoria New York was attended by dignitaries in town for the opening of the United Nations General Assembly, and entertainment included a performance by Grammy Award-winning rapper Nelly.

== See also ==
- Federal prosecution of Donald Trump
- Legal teams involved in the Mueller special counsel investigation
- New York investigations of the Trump Organization
