= Tulinabo S. Mushingi =

Congolese-American diplomat (born 1956)

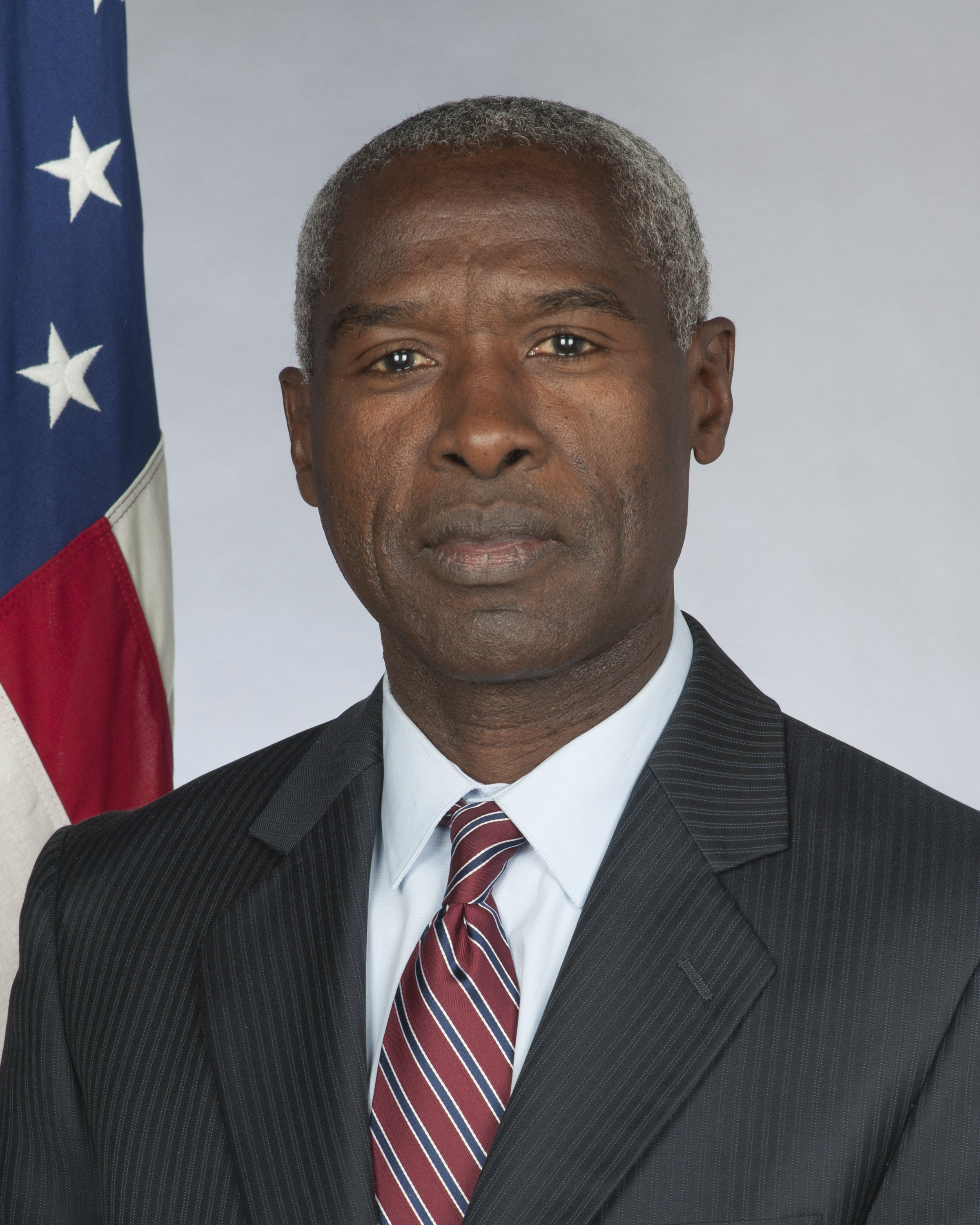

10th United States Ambassador to Angola
- In office March 9, 2022 – October 22, 2024
- President: Joe Biden
- Preceded by: Nina Maria Fite
- Succeeded by: James B. Story (charge d’affaires)

United States Ambassador to São Tomé and Príncipe
- In office August 10, 2022 – October 2024
- President: Joe Biden
- Preceded by: Robert E. Whitehead; Chargé d'Affaires

United States Ambassador to Senegal
- In office August 4, 2017 – February 1, 2022
- President: Donald Trump; Joe Biden
- Preceded by: James P. Zumwalt
- Succeeded by: Michael A. Raynor

United States Ambassador to Guinea-Bissau
- In office August 4, 2017 – February 1, 2022
- President: Donald Trump; Joe Biden
- Preceded by: James P. Zumwalt
- Succeeded by: Michael A. Raynor

United States Ambassador to Burkina Faso
- In office September 17, 2013 – October 27, 2016
- President: Barack Obama
- Preceded by: J. Thomas Dougherty
- Succeeded by: Andrew Robert Young

Personal details
- Born: August 4, 1956 (age 70) Congo-Kinshasa
- Spouse: Rebecca Mushingi
- Children: 1
- Education: Higher Pedagogical Institute; Howard University; Georgetown University

Tulinabo Salama Mushingi (born August 4, 1956, in the Democratic Republic of Congo) is an American diplomat who served as the United States ambassador to Angola and the United States ambassador to São Tomé and Príncipe from 2022 to 2024. He previously served as the United States ambassador to Burkina Faso from 2013 to 2016, and a joint appointment as United States ambassador to Senegal and United States ambassador to Guinea-Bissau from 2017 to 2022. He also served in the executive offices of Secretaries of State John F. Kerry and Hillary Clinton.

== Early career ==
Mushingi started his career with the United States Peace Corps and served in Papua New Guinea, the Democratic Republic of the Congo, Niger and the Central African Republic. He earned a master's degree from Howard University and a Doctor of Philosophy from Georgetown University. He was also a visiting lecturer at Dartmouth College for many years and taught at Howard University, before being hired as an instructor at the U.S. State Department's Foreign Service Institute.

== Foreign Service career ==
After being accepted into the foreign service, Mushingi served a series of domestic and overseas assignments including Kuala Lumpur, Malaysia; Maputo, Mozambique; Lusaka, Zambia; Casablanca, Morocco; and tours in Washington D.C. in the Bureau of Intelligence and Research; the Bureau of International Organization Affairs and the Bureau of Human Resources.

From 2003 to 2006, he served as the management officer assigned to travel with Deputy Secretary of State Richard Armitage, and from 2006 to 2009, Mushingi worked as management counselor of the U.S. Embassy in Tanzania.

In 2009, he was promoted to Deputy Chief of Mission, and served as chargé d'affaires for the U.S. Embassy in Addis Ababa, Ethiopia. From 2011 to 2013, he served in the Executive Offices of Secretary of State Hillary Clinton and later John Kerry.

=== United States ambassador to Burkina Faso ===
On April 11, 2013, President Barack Obama nominated Mushingi to be the next ambassador to Burkina Faso. Hearings on his nomination were held before the Senate Foreign Relations Committee on June 19, 2013. The committee favorably reported his nomination on June 25, 2013. Mushingi was confirmed by the full Senate on July 9, 2013.

=== United States ambassador to Senegal ===
In early 2017, President Barack Obama nominated Mushingi to serve as United States Ambassador to Senegal and concurrently United States Ambassador to Guinea-Bissau. The nomination was withdrawn by President Donald Trump, who subsequently renominated Mushingi to the same position. Hearings on his nomination were held before the Senate Foreign Relations Committee on April 26, 2017. The committee favorably reported his nomination on May 9, 2017. He was confirmed by the United States Senate by voice vote on May 18, 2017. He presented his credentials to Senegalese President Macky Sall on August 4, 2017.

=== United States ambassador to Angola and São Tomé and Príncipe ===
On April 15, 2021, President Joe Biden nominated Mushingi to be the next United States Ambassador to Angola and United States Ambassador to São Tomé and Príncipe. On April 19, 2021, his nomination was sent to the Senate. Hearings on his nomination were held before the Senate Foreign Relations Committee on June 9, 2021. The committee favorably reported his nomination to the Senate floor on June 24, 2021. On December 18, 2021, he was confirmed by the United States Senate via voice vote.

Mushingi presented his credentials to President João Lourenço on March 9, 2022. He presented his credentials to President Carlos Vila Nova on August 10, 2022. He retired in October 2024.

== Awards and decorations ==
- Officer of the National Order of Burkina-Faso
- Palmer Award for the Advancement of Democracy

== Personal life ==
Mushingi speaks Portuguese, French, and Swahili.

== See also ==
- Ambassadors of the United States

Diplomatic posts
Preceded by J. Thomas Dougherty	United States Ambassador to Burkina Faso; 2013–2016	Succeeded by Andrew Robert Young
Preceded by James P. Zumwalt	United States Ambassador to Senegal; 2017–2022	Succeeded by Michael A. Raynor
Preceded by James P. Zumwalt	United States Ambassador to Guinea-Bissau; 2017–2022	Succeeded by Michael A. Raynor
Preceded by Nina Maria Fite	United States Ambassador to Angola; 2022–2024	Vacant
Preceded by Samuel R. Watson; Chargé d'Affaires	United States Ambassador to São Tomé and Príncipe; 2022–2024	Vacant
