= List of ambassadors of the United States to the United Kingdom =

Ambassador of the United States of America to the Court of St James's
- Seal of the United States Department of State

- Flag of the United States ambassador

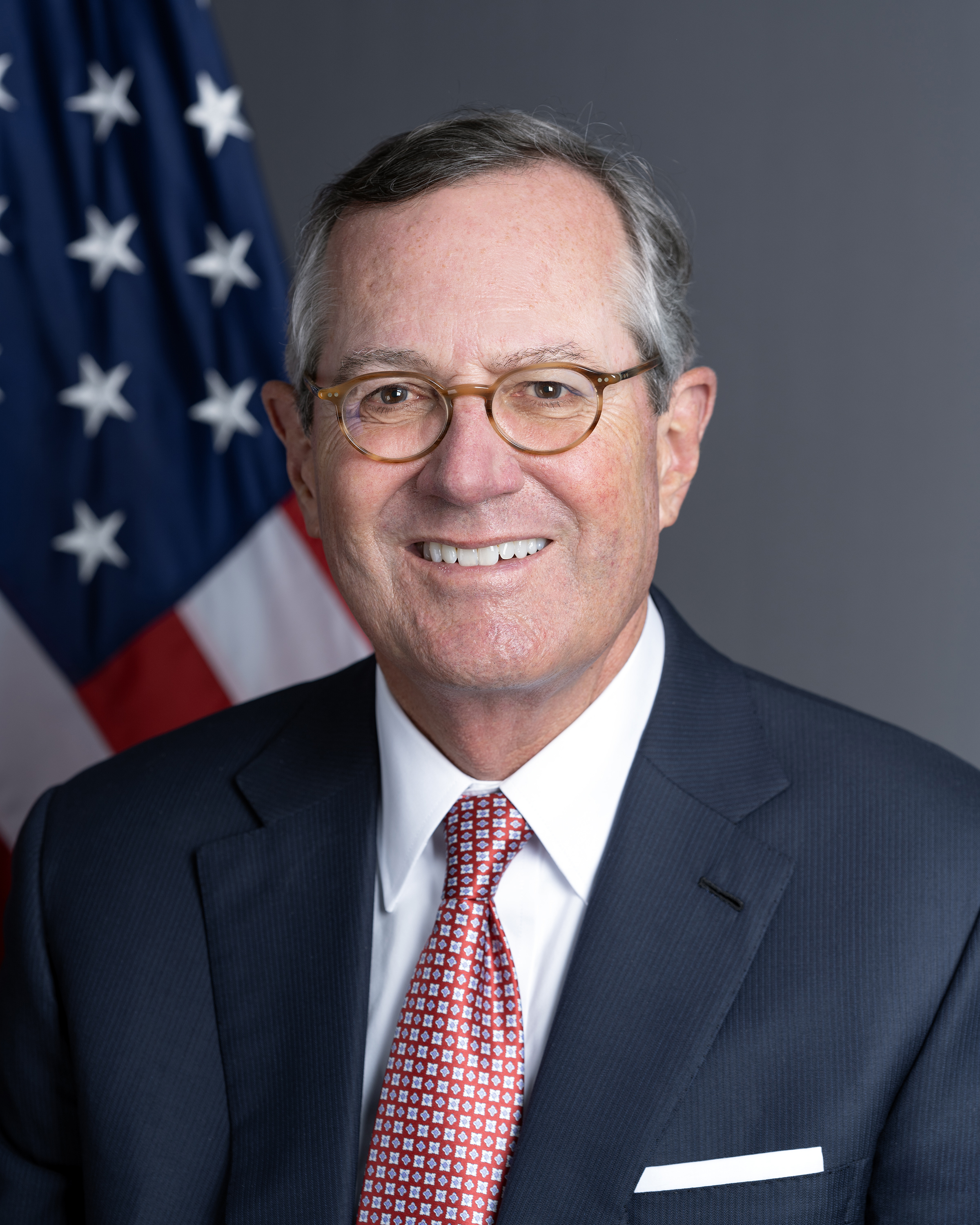
- Incumbent; Warren Stephens since May 21, 2025
- U.S. Department of State
- Style: His or Her Excellency (formal); Mr. or Madam Ambassador (informal)
- Reports to: United States Secretary of State
- Residence: Winfield House
- Seat: Embassy of the United States, London, United Kingdom
- Appointer: President of the United States; with the advice and consent of the Senate
- Term length: At the pleasure of the president
- Inaugural holder: John Adams (as Minister Plenipotentiary to the Court of St. James's)
- Formation: 1785
- Website: uk.usembassy.gov

The United States ambassador to the United Kingdom, formally the ambassador of the United States of America to the Court of St James's, is the official representative of the president and the United States government to the British monarch (the Court of St James's) and the government of the United Kingdom. The position is currently held by Warren Stephens, who presented his credentials to King Charles III on May 21, 2025.

The position is regarded as one of the most prestigious posts in the United States Foreign Service due to the Special Relationship between the United States and the United Kingdom. The ambassadorship has been held by various notable politicians, including five who would later become president: John Adams, James Monroe, John Quincy Adams, Martin Van Buren and James Buchanan. However, the modern tendency of American presidents (of both parties) is to appoint keen political fundraisers from previous presidential campaigns, despite the importance and prestige of the office.

The ambassador and executive staff work at the American Embassy in Nine Elms, London. The official residence of the ambassador is Winfield House in Regent's Park.

== Duties ==
The ambassador's main duty is to present U.S. policies to the government of the United Kingdom and its people, as well as report British policies and views to the federal government of the United States. The ambassador serves as a primary channel of communication between the two nations and plays an important role in treaty negotiations.

The ambassador is the head of the United States' consular service in the United Kingdom. As well as directing diplomatic activity in support of trade, the ambassador is ultimately responsible for visa services and for the provision of consular support to American citizens in the UK and oversees cultural relations between the two countries.

== List of U.S. chiefs of mission to the Court of St James's ==
=== Ministers (1785–1812) ===
Independent

Democratic-Republican

Democrat

Whig

Republican

John Adams is referred to as the first "ambassador". He is also referred to as the first "minister plenipotentiary". Plenipotentiary means "having full power"; a minister that has power to act for their country in all matters.

Name	Portrait	Appointment	Presentation	Termination	Appointer	Notes
John Adams		February 24, 1785	June 1, 1785	February 20, 1788	Congress	Second president of the United States (Note: John Adams became so frustrated with his cool reception at the court that he closed the legation in 1788 and the post remained vacant for four years.)
Thomas Pinckney		January 12, 1792	August 9, 1792	July 27, 1796	George Washington	
Rufus King		May 20, 1796	July 27, 1796	May 16, 1803	George Washington	
James Monroe		1803	August 17, 1803	October 7, 1807	Thomas Jefferson	Fifth president of the United States
William Pinkney		February 26, 1808	April 27, 1808	May 7, 1811	Thomas Jefferson	
Jonathan Russell		July 27, 1811	November 15, 1811	June 18, 1812	James Madison	(Note: From 1811 to the outbreak of the War of 1812, chargé d'affaires Jonathan Russell was the chief United States officer in London. The United States severed relations with the United Kingdom on the outbreak of the War of 1812; normal relations were restored in 1815.)

=== Ministers (1815–1893) ===
Diplomatic relations with what had now become the United Kingdom of Great Britain and Ireland were restored after the War of 1812. The Congress of Vienna (1815) established a uniform system of diplomatic rank. Under that system, the highest rank of "ambassador" was a personal representative of a sovereign, and the next rank of "minister", represented a government. As a republic, the United States maintained diplomatic relations with Britain at the rank of Envoy Extraordinary and Minister Plenipotentiary. The rank was colloquially known as Minister, and the position continued to be referred to as "United States Minister to Great Britain".

Name	Portrait	Appointment	Presentation	Termination	Appointer	Notes
John Quincy Adams		April 28, 1814	June 8, 1815	May 14, 1817	James Madison	Sixth president of the United States and son of John Adams
Richard Rush		1817	February 12, 1818	April 27, 1825	James Monroe	
Rufus King		May 5, 1825	November 11, 1825	June 16, 1826	John Quincy Adams	
Albert Gallatin		May 10, 1826	September 1, 1826	October 4, 1827	John Quincy Adams	
William Beach Lawrence		Nov 23, 1827		November 24, 1828	John Quincy Adams	
James Barbour		May 23, 1828	November 24, 1828	October 1, 1829	John Quincy Adams	
Louis McLane		1829	October 12, 1829	June 13, 1831	Andrew Jackson	
Martin Van Buren		August 8, 1831	September 21, 1831	March 19, 1832	Andrew Jackson	Eighth president of the United States
Aaron Vail		July 13, 1832		July 13, 1836	Andrew Jackson	(Note: Chargé d'affaires)
Andrew Stevenson		March 16, 1836	July 13, 1836	October 21, 1841	Andrew Jackson	
Edward Everett		1841	December 16, 1841	August 8, 1845	John Tyler	
Louis McLane		1845	August 8, 1845	August 18, 1846	James K. Polk	
George Bancroft		September 9, 1846	November 12, 1846	August 31, 1849	James K. Polk	
Abbott Lawrence		August 20, 1849	October 20, 1849	October 12, 1852	Zachary Taylor	
Joseph R. Ingersoll		August 21, 1852	October 16, 1852	August 23, 1853	Millard Fillmore	
James Buchanan		April 11, 1853	August 23, 1853	March 15, 1856	Franklin Pierce	Fifteenth president of the United States
George M. Dallas		February 4, 1856	April 4, 1856	May 16, 1861	Franklin Pierce	
Charles Francis Adams Sr.		March 20, 1861	May 16, 1861	May 13, 1868	Abraham Lincoln	Son of John Quincy Adams
Reverdy Johnson		June 12, 1868	September 14, 1868	May 13, 1869	Andrew Johnson	
John Lothrop Motley		April 13, 1869	June 18, 1869	December 6, 1870	Ulysses S. Grant	
Robert C. Schenck		December 22, 1870	June 23, 1871	March 3, 1876	Ulysses S. Grant	
Edwards Pierrepont		May 22, 1876	July 11, 1876	December 22, 1877	Ulysses S. Grant	
John Welsh		November 9, 1877	December 22, 1877	August 14, 1879	Rutherford B. Hayes	
James Russell Lowell		January 26, 1880	March 11, 1880	May 19, 1885	Rutherford B. Hayes	
Edward John Phelps		March 23, 1885	May 19, 1885	January 31, 1889	Grover Cleveland	
Robert Todd Lincoln		March 30, 1889	May 25, 1889	May 4, 1893	Benjamin Harrison	

=== Ambassadors (1893–present) ===
Although France became a republic in 1870, the country continued to exchange ambassadors with other Great Powers. In 1893, the United States followed the French precedent and upgraded its relations with other Great Powers to the ambassadorial level. The United States Legation in London became the United States Embassy, and the United States Minister to Great Britain became the United States Ambassador to Great Britain.

Name	Portrait	Appointment	Presentation	Termination	Appointer	Notes
Thomas F. Bayard		1893	June 22, 1893	March 17, 1897	Grover Cleveland	
John Hay		1897	May 3, 1897	September 12, 1898	William McKinley	
Joseph Hodges Choate		January 19, 1899	March 6, 1899	May 23, 1905	William McKinley	Continued service under Theodore Roosevelt after President McKinley's assassination in September 1901.
Whitelaw Reid		March 8, 1905	June 5, 1905	December 15, 1912	Theodore Roosevelt	
Walter Hines Page		April 21, 1913	May 30, 1913	October 3, 1918	Woodrow Wilson	
John W. Davis		November 21, 1918	December 18, 1918	March 9, 1921	Woodrow Wilson	
George Brinton McClellan Harvey		April 16, 1921	May 12, 1921	November 3, 1923	Warren G. Harding	
Frank B. Kellogg		1924	January 14, 1924	February 10, 1925	Calvin Coolidge	
Alanson B. Houghton		February 24, 1925	April 27, 1925	March 28, 1929	Calvin Coolidge	
Charles G. Dawes		April 16, 1929	June 15, 1929	December 30, 1931	Herbert Hoover	
Andrew W. Mellon		February 5, 1932	April 9, 1932	March 17, 1933	Herbert Hoover	
Robert Worth Bingham		March 23, 1933	May 23, 1933	November 19, 1937	Franklin D. Roosevelt	
Joseph P. Kennedy		January 17, 1938	March 8, 1938	October 22, 1940	Franklin D. Roosevelt	
John G. Winant		February 11, 1941	March 1, 1941	April 10, 1946	Franklin D. Roosevelt	
W. Averell Harriman		April 2, 1946	April 30, 1946	October 1, 1946	Harry S. Truman	
Lewis W. Douglas		March 6, 1947	March 25, 1947	November 16, 1950	Harry S. Truman	
Walter S. Gifford		December 12, 1950	December 21, 1950	January 23, 1953	Harry S. Truman	
Winthrop W. Aldrich		February 2, 1953	February 20, 1953	February 1, 1957	Dwight D. Eisenhower	
John Hay Whitney		February 11, 1957	February 28, 1957	January 14, 1961	Dwight D. Eisenhower	
David K. E. Bruce		February 22, 1961	March 17, 1961	March 20, 1969	John F. Kennedy	Continued service under Lyndon B. Johnson after President Kennedy's assassination in November 1963.
Walter Annenberg		March 14, 1969	April 29, 1969	October 30, 1974	Richard Nixon	Continued service under Gerald Ford after President Nixon's resignation in August 1974.
Elliot Richardson		February 20, 1975	March 21, 1975	January 16, 1976	Gerald Ford	
Anne Armstrong		January 29, 1976	March 17, 1976	March 3, 1977	Gerald Ford	
Kingman Brewster, Jr.		April 29, 1977	June 3, 1977	February 23, 1981	Jimmy Carter	
John J. Louis, Jr.		May 7, 1981	May 27, 1981	November 7, 1983	Ronald Reagan	
Charles H. Price II		November 11, 1983	December 20, 1983	February 28, 1989	Ronald Reagan	
Henry E. Catto, Jr.		April 14, 1989	May 17, 1989	March 13, 1991	George H. W. Bush	
Raymond G. H. Seitz		April 25, 1991	June 25, 1991	May 10, 1994	George H. W. Bush	
William J. Crowe		May 13, 1994	June 2, 1994	September 20, 1997	Bill Clinton	
Philip Lader		August 1, 1997	September 22, 1997	February 28, 2001	Bill Clinton	
William S. Farish III		July 12, 2001	August 1, 2001	July 10, 2004	George W. Bush	
Robert H. Tuttle		July 9, 2005	October 19, 2005	February 6, 2009	George W. Bush	
Louis Susman		July 13, 2009	October 13, 2009	April 3, 2013	Barack Obama	
Matthew Barzun		August 6, 2013	December 4, 2013	January 18, 2017	Barack Obama	(Note: Lewis Lukens became the chargé d'affaires.)
Lewis Lukens		January 18, 2017	January 18, 2017	November 8, 2017	Donald Trump	Chargé d'Affaires
Woody Johnson		August 3, 2017	November 8, 2017	January 20, 2021	Donald Trump	
Yael Lempert		January 20, 2021	January 20, 2021	August 1, 2021	Joe Biden	Chargé d'Affaires
Philip Reeker		July 15, 2021	August 1, 2021	July 19, 2022	Joe Biden	Chargé d'Affaires
Jane D. Hartley		May 25, 2022	July 19, 2022	January 20, 2025	Joe Biden	
Matthew Palmer		January 20, 2025	January 20, 2025	May 12, 2025	Donald Trump	Chargé d'Affaires
Warren Stephens		April 29, 2025	May 21, 2025	Incumbent	Donald Trump	

== See also ==
- Ambassadors of the United States
- Embassy of the United Kingdom, Washington, D.C.
- Foreign relations of the United Kingdom
- List of ambassadors of the United Kingdom to the United States
- United Kingdom–United States relations
