= Wesley Egan =

American diplomat

Wesley William Egan Jr. (born January 1946 in Madison, Wisconsin) is an American retired career foreign-service officer who served as the U.S. Ambassador to Guinea-Bissau from 1983 until 1986 and U.S. Ambassador to Jordan from 1994 until 1998. He was Chargé d'Affaires ad interim from August 1987 to January 1988 in Portugal.

== Biography ==
Egan graduated from Cooper High School in Abilene, Texas, in 1964 and the University of North Carolina at Chapel Hill in 1968.
