= John Giordano (lawyer) =

American lawyer

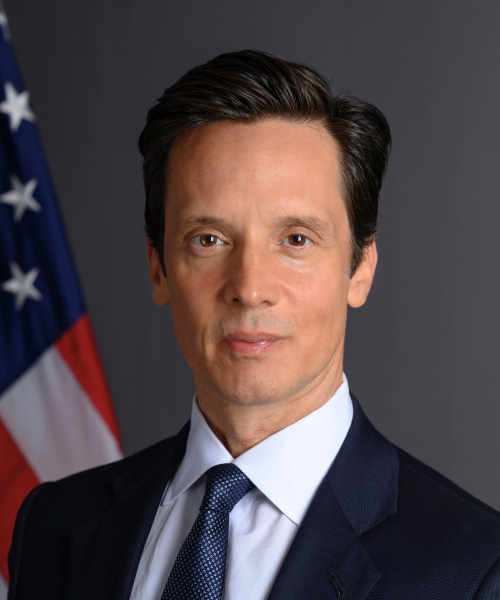
- Official portrait, 2025

United States Ambassador to Namibia
- Incumbent
- Assumed office October 29, 2025
- President: Donald Trump
- Preceded by: Randy Berry

United States Attorney for the District of New Jersey
- Interim
- In office March 3, 2025 – March 27, 2025
- President: Donald Trump
- Preceded by: Philip R. Sellinger; Vikas Khanna (acting)
- Succeeded by: Alina Habba (interim)

Personal details
- Born: February 11, 1975 (age 51)
- Party: Republican
- Education: Villanova University (BA, JD)

John Giordano (born February 11, 1975) is an American lawyer who has served as the United States ambassador to Namibia since October 2025. He previously served as the acting United States attorney for the District of New Jersey in March 2025.

== Early life ==
Giordano grew up in Burlington County, New Jersey, the son of Dorothy and Frank Giordano, a former president of Philadelphia's Union League and the Philly Pops. He attended Villanova University for both his undergraduate education and law school, and he was inducted into the Phi Beta Kappa honor society in 1998. After graduating, he clerked for Judge Joseph E. Irenas of the United States District Court for the District of New Jersey.

== Career ==
After finishing his clerkship, Giordano was an associate at the law firm DLA Piper before becoming a partner at Archer & Greiner, a firm in Philadelphia. During the second term of President George W. Bush, Giordano served in the United States Department of Energy, U.S. attorney's office for the Eastern District of Virginia, and United States Department of Justice Environment and Natural Resources Division.

In 2011, Giordano briefly ran for a seat on the Philadelphia City Council before dropping out. After serving as deputy secretary of the Pennsylvania Department of Conservation and Natural Resources, Giordano worked as assistant commissioner of the New Jersey Department of Environmental Protection. Giordano also taught at the University of Pennsylvania Law School during this period.

After Donald Trump won the 2016 presidential election, Giordano assisted the first presidential transition of Donald Trump, serving as deputy general counsel. In 2019, Trump appointed Giordano as an American representative at the 74th United Nations General Assembly.

On March 3, 2025, United States Attorney General Pamela Bondi appointed Giordano as acting United States attorney for the District of New Jersey after New Jersey State Senator Doug Steinhardt declined the position. Giordano succeeded Vikas Khanna, who had assumed the position upon the resignation of Philip R. Sellinger on January 8, 2025.

On March 24, Trump announced that Counselor to the President Alina Habba would take over "effective immediately" as interim U.S. attorney, with Giordano potentially being nominated to become United States ambassador to Namibia. Giordano continued to sign documents as U.S. attorney through March 27, and that day Bondi signed Habba's appointment, effective March 28, the day she was sworn in.

Giordano was nominated to be United States ambassador to Namibia on April 29, 2025, and the United States Senate Committee on Foreign Relations held a hearing on his nomination on July 29, 2025.

== Personal life ==
In 2017, Giordano married Yasmina Maracealle Moukarzel at Philadelphia's St. Mark's Episcopal Church. In 2019, Giordano reportedly gave the Trump Victory team the largest single donation from the Philadelphia area, a total of $25,000.

Giordano is a member of the White House Historical Association's National Council. During the 2024 United States elections, Giordano made significant donations to Republican candidates, including Donald Trump's presidential campaign.
