= Stephen Phillips (academic) =

American philosopher, sanskritist, academic

Stephen H. Phillips
- Occupations: Philosopher, sanskritist, academic, and author

Academic background
- Education: A.B. Ph.D.
- Alma mater: Harvard College; Harvard University

Academic work
- Institutions: University of Texas at Austin

Stephen H. Phillips is an American philosopher, sanskritist, academic, and author. He is an Emeritus Professor of Philosophy and Asian Studies at the University of Texas at Austin.

Phillips' research interests encompass Vedanta, Nyaya, and Yoga, alongside topics in philosophy of religion, meta-philosophy, and theory of value, focusing primarily on Indian philosophy. He has published over 60 papers in scholarly venues.

Phillips has authored/co-authored eleven books, including a three-volume translation of the Tattva-cintā-maṇi, Yoga, Karma, and Rebirth: A Brief History and Philosophy, and Epistemology in Classical India: The Knowledge Sources of the Nyāya School. He also co-authored the Nyāya-sūtra: Selections with Early Commentaries with Matthew Dasti, and God and the World's Arrangement with Nirmalya Guha and Dasti.

== Education ==
Phillips graduated from McCallie School in Chattanooga, Tennessee, in 1968. Pursuing higher education at Harvard College, he received his Bachelor of Arts degree in 1975, and went on to earn a Ph.D. at Harvard in 1982. He attended the Sri Aurobindo International Centre for Education, a yoga-ashram school in Pondicherry, India, for two years, 1972 and 1973, where he began learning Sanskrit.

== Career ==
Phillips served on the executive committee of the Center for Asian Studies of the University of Texas at Austin in 1982, 1983, 1985, 1986, and 1987, and concurrently held the position of co-director of the Sanskrit Database Project from 1987 to 1988. Following these roles, he was appointed Associate Chair of Philosophy, a position he held until 1999. He holds the position of emeritus Professor of Philosophy and Asian Studies at the University of Texas at Austin. Additionally, he held Visiting Professorships in Philosophy at the University of Hawaii in 1995 and Jadavpur University in 2008.

== Works ==
During the 1980s, Phillips published the book Aurobindo's Philosophy of Brahman, which Robert Minor described as "a refreshing exception: insightful and well-informed" in its analysis of Aurobindo's metaphysical concepts and claims. Turning his attention to the development of metaphysics in India, he published Classical Indian Metaphysics: Refutations of Realism and the Emergence of the "New Logic," highlighting the increasing sophistication of the arguments on both sides of a "realism-idealism" controversy, as each party learned from its rivals, in particular Buddhist Yogācāra and Nyāya. Michael Barnhart praised the in-depth discussion of the Nyāya tradition of logic, epistemology, and ontology, describing the work as "gratifying." He further remarked that the book "endeavors to explore the relevance of these ancient debates."

Phillips authored Yoga, Karma, and Rebirth in 2009, named an "Outstanding Academic Title" by Choice, exploring key yoga traditions and concepts with original translations to illuminate yoga's conceptual legacy. William Yeoman noted that the book is structured "in an accessible, lively, and engaging yet intellectually rigorous way," while Matthew Dasti commented, "I think that philosophically inquisitive and thoughtful readers will benefit from reading (and rereading)."

Phillips' book, Epistemology of Perception: Gangesa's Tattvacintāmaṇi, translated The Perception Chapter from Gangesa's Jewel of Reflection on the Truth about Epistemology, providing historical context, analysis of Nyaya philosophy, and comparisons with Western traditions. Jonardon Ganeri praised it as "A work so good that it makes possible detailed philosophical engagement." He also co-edited Ratnākīrti's Proof of Momentariness by Positive Correlation (Kṣaṇabhaṅgasiddhi Anvayātmikā), which provided the first published translation of Ratnākīrti's argument on momentariness from positive correlations (wherever F there G) and featured a detailed commentary elucidating each step of Ratnākīrti's reasoning.

In 2013, Phillips, in Epistemology in Classical India: The Knowledge Sources of the Nyāya School, outlined Nyāya's externalist approach to knowledge and internalist perspective on justification, a work Christopher G. Framarin described as "useful to philosophers more generally." In The Nyāya-Sūtra: Selections with Early Commentaries, he and Dasti translated selections from the Nyāya-sūtra and its early commentaries, highlighting Nyāya's foundational ideas and their role in Indian thought—described by Mark Siderits as "clearly needed for anyone who has tried to teach Nyāya."

In 2020, Phillips published in three volumes the first complete translation of the monumental Tattva-cintā-maṇi of Gaṅgeśa, which dominated philosophic thought in India from the fourteenth century to the modern era. The work impacted not only Nyāya and other philosophical traditions but also fields such as jurisprudence, aesthetics, and medicine. Ananda Vaidya described it is a "masterful translation" of a text that "rivals the work of Immanuel Kant in terms of its depth and significance," and Michael Williams wrote in the same roundtable discussion, "Phillips presents a perspicuous introduction to the theory of inference, which is necessary to understanding Gaṅgeśa’s work, which constantly employs inferential arguments," while Eberhard Guhe called it "a landmark achievement."

In 2021, a brief work was published on Vedāntic and Naiyāyika natural theology, co-authored with Nirmalya Guha and Dasti, titled God and the World’s Arrangement, a volume praised by PhilPapers for its careful selection and student-focused annotations, with Swami Narasimhananda commending its "elegant" translations in modern English idioms, marked the beginning of his latest research focus on Vedānta. In 2024, he published The Metaphysics of Meditation: Sri Aurobindo and Adi-Sankara on the Isa Upanisad, a work that connects classical and modern Indian philosophy, offering insights into meditation and contributing to Advaita Vedanta discourse.

== Bibliography ==
=== Books ===
- Classical Indian Metaphysics: Refutations of Realism and the Emergence of "New Logic" (1995) ISBN 9780812692983
- Yoga, Karma, and Rebirth: A Brief History and Philosophy (2009) ISBN 9780231144858
- Epistemology of Perception (2009) ISBN 9788120833326
- Ratnakīrti's Proof of Momentariness by Positive Correlation (2011) ISBN 9781935011064
- Epistemology in Classical India: The Knowledge Sources of the Nyāya School (2014) ISBN 9781138008816
- Jewel of Reflection on the Truth About Epistemology: A Complete and Annotated Translation of the Tattva-Cintāmaṇi, Three-Volume Edition (2020) ISBN 9781350066533
- God and the World's Arrangement: Readings from Vedanta and Nyaya Philosophy of Religion (2021) ISBN 9781624669590
- The Metaphysics of Meditation: Sri Aurobindo and Adi-Sakara on the Isa Upanisad (2024) ISBN 9781350412415

=== Selected articles ===
- Phillips, S. H. (1987). Dharmakīrti on sensation and causal efficiency. Journal of Indian Philosophy, 231–259.
- Phillips, S. H. (2001). There's nothing wrong with raw perception: A response to Chakrabarti's attack on Nyāya's" nirvikalpaka pratyakṣa". Philosophy East and West, 104–113.
- Phillips, S. H. (2001). Could there be mystical evidence for a nondual Brahman? A causal objection. Philosophy East and West, 492–506.
- Phillips, S. H. (2004). Perceiving Particulars Blindly: Remarks on a Nyāya-Buddhist Controversy. Philosophy East and West, 389–403.
- Dasti, M., & Phillips, S. H. (2010). Pramāṇa are factive—a response to Jonardon Ganeri. Philosophy East and West, 60(4), 535–540.
- Phillips, S. H. (2013). Padmapāda's illusion argument. In Epistemology (pp. 209–229). Routledge.
