= George F. Ward =

American diplomat

3rd United States Ambassador to Namibia
- In office 1996–1999
- President: Bill Clinton
- Preceded by: Marshall Fletcher McCallie
- Succeeded by: Jeffrey A. Bader

Personal details
- Education: University of Rochester

George F. Ward (born 1945) is a former United States Ambassador to Namibia.

== Education ==
Ward earned a BA degree in history from the University of Rochester and an MPA degree from Harvard University. He entered the Foreign Service in 1969.

== Other diplomatic posts ==
- 1989 – 1992: Deputy chief of the U.S. mission in Bonn

Diplomatic posts
Preceded by Marshall Fletcher McCallie	United States Ambassador to Namibia; 1996–1999	Succeeded by Jeffrey A. Bader
