= James P. Zumwalt =

American diplomat (born 1956)

James Zumwalt
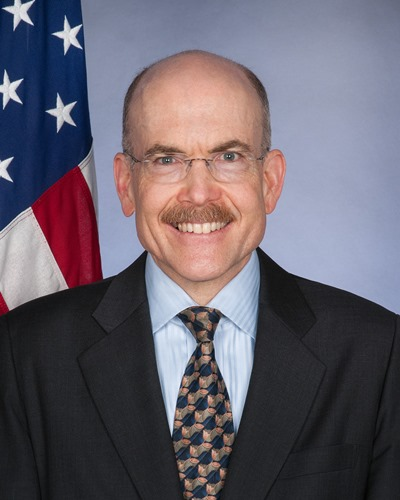

United States Ambassador to Senegal
- In office March 10, 2015 – January 19, 2017
- President: Barack Obama
- Preceded by: Lewis Lukens
- Succeeded by: Tulinabo S. Mushingi

United States Ambassador to Guinea-Bissau
- In office March 10, 2015 – January 19, 2017
- President: Barack Obama
- Preceded by: Lewis Lukens
- Succeeded by: Tulinabo S. Mushingi

Personal details
- Born: April 13, 1956 (age 70) El Cajon, California, U.S.
- Education: University of California, Berkeley (BA); National War College

James Peter Zumwalt (born April 13, 1956) is an American diplomat with expertise in trade, economy, and East Asia. On November 19, 2014, he was confirmed by the U.S. Senate as the U.S. Ambassador to Senegal and to Guinea-Bissau. Previously, he worked as the Deputy Assistant Secretary of State for East Asian and Pacific Affairs, covering Japan and Korea. Until December 2011, he was the Deputy Chief of Mission of the U.S. Embassy in Tokyo where he also served as chargé d'affaires ad interim during the absence of an Ambassador from January to August 2009. He coordinated the U.S. Embassy's response to the 2011 Tōhoku earthquake and tsunami.

Zumwalt became the CEO of Sasakawa Peace Foundation USA, a think tank dedicated to the U.S.-Japan relations, on February 20, 2017. He then was appointed Chair of the Board of Trustees of the Japan-America Society of Washington DC in September 2019.

== Early life ==
Zumwalt was born and raised in El Cajon, California.

Zumwalt attended University of California, Berkeley, where he received a Bachelor of Arts in American History and in Japanese Language. He graduated in 1979.

== Career ==
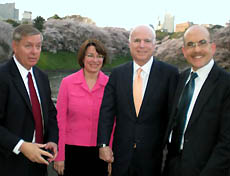
U.S. Senators Lindsey Graham, Amy Klobuchar, and John McCain with Chargé d'Affaires James Zumwalt, in Chiyoda Ward, Tōkyō, April 2009.

Within the State Department in Washington, D.C, Zumwalt worked as an expert on Asia, especially East Asia. He is proficient in Japanese, as well as French and Mandarin Chinese.

- the Bureau of East Asian and Pacific Affairs Philippines and Korea desks and then Front Office,* the Bureau of Economic and Business Affairs * the United States Trade Representative's Office of Japan and China.。
- (1981–83) Economic Officer in Embassy Kinshasa .
- (1983–85) Consulate Kobe Consular Officer .
- (1989–1993) Embassy Tokyo Economic Officer

In 1998 he earned a master's degree in International Security Studies from the National War College.

- (1999–2002) Economic Minister-Counselor in Embassy Beijing
- (2002–2003) Economic Counselor,
- (2004–2006) Economic Minister,
- (2006–2008) Director of the Office of Japanese Affairs in the Department of State, Washington, D.C.
- (2008– January 15, 2009) the Deputy Chief of Mission of US Embassy
- (2009.01.15 – 2009.08.20) the chargé d'affaires ad interim

When Barack Obama became the President and the US Ambassador to Japan, Tom Schieffer, resigned, Zumwalt worked as the chargé d'affaires ad interim from January 15, 2009, until August 20, 2009, when John Roos became ambassador. Zumwalt again served as the Deputy Chief of Mission of US Embassy in Japan from 2008 to 2012.

- 2009-2012 Deputy Chief of Mission, Tokyo, Japan
- 2012-2014 Deputy Asst. Secretary of State, East Asia and Pacific
- 2015-2017 Ambassador to Senegal and Ambassador to Guinea-Bissau

== See also ==
- United States Ambassador to Senegal
- United States Ambassador to Guinea-Bissau

Diplomatic posts
Preceded by Lewis Lukens	United States Ambassador to Senegal; 2015–2017	Succeeded by Tulinabo S. Mushingi
Preceded by Lewis Lukens	United States Ambassador to Guinea-Bissau; 2015–2017	Succeeded by Tulinabo S. Mushingi
