= Jeffrey A. Bader =

American diplomat (1945–2023)

United States Ambassador to Namibia
- In office October 13, 1999 – April 6, 2001
- President: Bill Clinton
- Preceded by: George F. Ward
- Succeeded by: Kevin McGuire

Personal details
- Born: Jeffrey Allen Bader; July 1, 1945 New York City, U.S.
- Died: October 22, 2023 (aged 78) Los Angeles, California, U.S.
- Spouse: Rohini Talalla
- Education: Yale College (BA); Columbia University (MA, PhD)

Jeffrey Allen Bader (July 1, 1945 – October 22, 2023) was an American diplomat who was senior director for East Asian affairs on the National Security Council in the Obama administration, with The New York Times calling him "one of the country's leading experts on China". He also served as the United States ambassador to Namibia from 1999 to 2001.

== Early life and education ==
Bader was born to a Jewish family in Brooklyn, New York City, in 1945. He held a BA from Yale College (1967) and a MA (1968) and PhD (1975) in European history from Columbia University. He spoke Chinese and French.

== Career ==
Bader first assignment with the United States Foreign Service was in Zaire. However, in 1977, he was chosen by Richard Holbrooke to join a team of up-and-coming diplomats tasked with building U.S. relations with the People's Republic of China. He spent several years in Beijing, and his subsequent work focused on China and East Asia more broadly, except when he served as Ambassador to Namibia during the last two years of presidency of Bill Clinton.

Bader retired from foreign service in 2002 and later joined the Brookings Institution, where he was senior fellow and inaugural director of the John L. Thornton China Center. From 2009 to 2011, he was senior director for East Asian affairs on the National Security Council during the Obama Administration. The following year, he published a memoir entitled Obama and China's Rise: An Insider's Account of America's Asia Strategy.

== Personal life and death ==
In 1985, Bader married documentary filmmaker Rohini Talalla whom he met in New York City. Talalla is an immigrant from Kuala Lumpur, Malaysia and is of mixed Sri Lankan, Welsh, Burmese and Chinese ancestry. At the time of his death, the couple lived in Venice, Los Angeles.

Bader died from pancreatic cancer at a hospice facility in Los Angeles on October 22, 2023, at the age of 78.

Diplomatic posts
Preceded by George F. Ward	United States Ambassador to Namibia; 1999–2001	Succeeded by Kevin McGuire
