= Lewis Lukens =

American diplomat

Lew Lukens
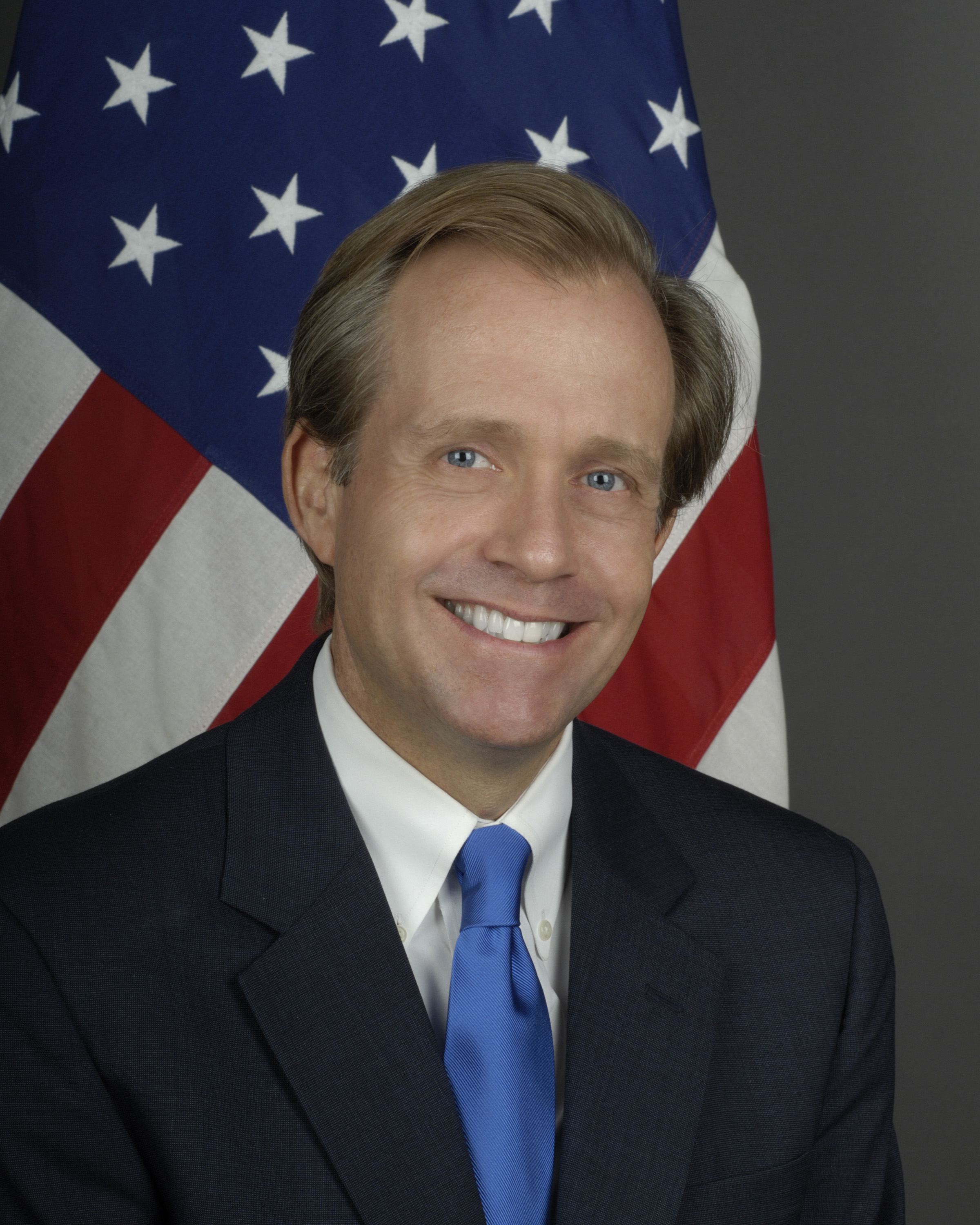

Deputy Chief of Mission at US Embassy London
- In office August 1, 2016 – January 1, 2019
- President: Barack Obama; Donald Trump
- Ambassador: Matthew Barzun; Woody Johnson
- Preceded by: Elizabeth Dibble
- Succeeded by: Yael Lempert

United States Ambassador to the United Kingdom
- Acting
- In office January 18, 2017 – August 21, 2017
- President: Barack Obama; Donald Trump
- Preceded by: Matthew Barzun
- Succeeded by: Woody Johnson

United States Ambassador to Senegal
- In office October 19, 2011 – June 4, 2014
- President: Barack Obama
- Preceded by: Marcia Bernicat
- Succeeded by: James Zumwalt

United States Ambassador to Guinea-Bissau
- In office October 19, 2011 – June 4, 2014
- President: Barack Obama
- Preceded by: Marcia Bernicat
- Succeeded by: James Zumwalt

Personal details
- Born: December 25, 1963 (age 62) Paris, France
- Spouse(s): Lucy Buxton (1992–2014); Andrea Topper (2015–present)
- Education: Princeton University (BA, MPP)

Lewis Alan Lukens is a retired American diplomat who served as the U.S. Ambassador to Senegal and Guinea-Bissau. His final assignment was as Deputy Chief of Mission of the U.S. Embassy in London.

== Early life and education ==
Lukens was born on December 25, 1963, in Paris, France. His father, Alan Wood Lukens, was US Chargé d'Affaires ad interim to the Republic of the Congo.

Lukens attended Princeton University, where he was awarded an AB degree in history. He received a master's degree from Princeton's Woodrow Wilson School of Public and International Affairs.

== Career ==
Lukens joined the United States Foreign Service in July 1989, serving in Southern China, Ivory Coast, Australia, Ireland, Iraq, Canada, Senegal, and the United Kingdom.

From 2008 to 2011, Lukens was executive director of the U.S. Department of State's Executive Secretariat, directing management support and overseas travel for Secretary of State Hillary Clinton. Lukens testified under oath in a legal case related to the Hillary Clinton email controversy.

From 2011 to 2014, Lukens was U.S. Ambassador to Senegal and Guinea-Bissau.

From August 2016 to January 2019, Lukens served as the Deputy Chief of Mission of the U.S. Embassy in London. On June 5, 2017, while serving as Acting Ambassador, Lukens tweeted his support for London mayor Sadiq Khan, after President Donald Trump had sent a tweet critical of Khan following a terrorist incident.

In February 2018, Lukens advised his superior, U.S. Ambassador to the United Kingdom Robert Wood Johnson IV, not to follow through on President Trump's request to try to get the British government to steer the British Open golf tournament to the Trump Turnberry resort in Scotland; Lukens warned that it would be an unethical use of the presidency for private gain. However, Johnson reportedly did make the attempt in an overture to the Secretary of State for Scotland.

In a pair of speeches to English universities in October 2018, Lukens used an anecdote about President Barack Obama's 2013 visit to Senegal to illustrate how allies can handle disagreements. Because of the complimentary reference to Obama, Ambassador Johnson referred to Lukens as a "traitor". Lukens alleged that Johnson had tried to use his position as ambassador to persuade the British government to move the lucrative British Open golf tournament to Trump's Turnberry golf resort. Johnson forced Lukens out of his tenure as Deputy Chief of Mission in January 2019, seven months before he was scheduled to leave for his next assignment, effectively ending his diplomatic career.

After the end of his tenure as diplomat, Lukens criticized the Trump administration for his handling of the State Department, and for what he felt was a decline in the United States' international influence. In a January 2021 interview with Newsweek, Lukens' stated that he felt "The last four years has put in doubt the U.S.'s reliability as a partner," and that Trump's administration had damaged both the relationship between the US and the UK, and the United States' international reputation.

Diplomatic posts
Preceded by Marcia Bernicat	United States Ambassador to Senegal; 2011–2014	Succeeded by James Zumwalt
Preceded by Marcia Bernicat	United States Ambassador to Guinea-Bissau; 2011–2014	Succeeded by James Zumwalt
Preceded by Matthew Barzun	United States Ambassador to the United Kingdom; Acting; 2017	Succeeded by Woody Johnson
