= William L. Jacobsen =

American diplomat (born 1936)

William Ludwig Jacobsen Jr. (born December 2, 1936) was the American Ambassador to Guinea-Bissau from November 13, 1989, to August 25, 1992. He also served as director of the U.S Liaison Office for Namibia from 1984 to 1985.

He received his undergraduate education at the University of Washington (1958) followed by a Master of Arts from Harvard University.

Diplomatic posts
Preceded by John Dale Blacken	United States Ambassador to Guinea-Bissau; 1989-1992	Succeeded by Roger A. McGuire
