= John Dale Blacken =

American diplomat

John Dale Blacken (August 26, 1930, Everett, Washington - August 3, 2015) was an American Ambassador who served as Ambassador to Guinea-Bissau.

== Biography ==
Blacken graduated from Washington State University with a B.A. in 1955) after having served in the United States Army from 1950 to 1952.

== Career ==
Before becoming a management analyst in the Office of the Secretary of Agriculture in 1958, Blacken was a salesman with Encyclopædia Britannica in San Francisco. He entered junior officer training at the Foreign Service Institute in 1961.

While ambassador, Blacken knew convicted American killer and hijacker George Wright, who had eluded the FBI for 41 years despite living in West Africa under his own name, on a social basis. Wright escaped from a New Jersey jail “and was wanted in a 1972 hijacking by the radical Black Liberation Army of a U.S. plane to Algeria.” Blacken claimed the FBI never notified the Embassy about the manhunt.

Diplomatic posts
Preceded by Barbara C. Maslak	United States Ambassador to Guinea-Bissau; 1986-1989	Succeeded by William Ludwig Jacobsen
