= Peggy Blackford =

American diplomat (1942–2024)

United States Ambassador to Guinea-Bissau
- In office November 4, 1995 – June 14, 1998
- President: Bill Clinton
- Preceded by: Roger A. McGuire
- Succeeded by: Richard Allan Roth

Personal details
- Born: 1942 Trenton, New Jersey, U.S.
- Died: March 30, 2024 (aged 81–82)
- Education: Ewing High School; Syracuse University; Pace University
- Occupation: Diplomat

Peggy Blackford (1942 – March 30, 2024) was an American diplomat who spent 28 years in the American Foreign Service. Blackford was the American Ambassador to Guinea-Bissau from 1995 until relations were suspended in June 1998 and she fled to Senegal to escape the rebellion in Guinea-Bissau.

Born in Trenton, New Jersey, Blackford was raised in nearby Ewing Township, New Jersey, and attended Ewing High School.

Blackford graduated from Syracuse University in 1963 with a degree in international relations and a master's in business administration from Pace University.
