= Harriet Elam-Thomas =

American diplomat (born 1941)

Harriet Lee Elam-Thomas

15th United States Ambassador to Senegal
- In office January 14, 2000 – December 6, 2002
- President: Bill Clinton; George W. Bush
- Preceded by: Dane F. Smith, Jr.
- Succeeded by: Richard Allen Roth

Personal details
- Born: September 15, 1941 (age 85) Boston
- Party: Democratic Party
- Education: Simmons College (B.S.); Tufts University (M.A.)
- Profession: Diplomat, professor

Harriet Lee Elam-Thomas (born 1941) is a United States diplomat and university professor who directs the Diplomacy Program under International and Global Studies at the University of Central Florida (UCF) in Orlando, Florida. From 2000 to 2002, Thomas served as the United States Ambassador to Senegal.

== Life and career ==
From 2003 to 2005, Thomas served as Diplomat-in-Residence at UCF under the auspices of a national U.S. Department of State program. She was the U.S. Department of State's official liaison in Central Florida, conducting workshops, providing information on careers, connecting students to internship and scholarship opportunities, and speaking on policy matters. In her capacity at UCF, Thomas is shaping a global initiative with education and training for both students and professionals.

Until the fall of 2005, she was a Senior Foreign Service Officer with the rank of Career Minister. Previously, she served as the U.S. Ambassador to Senegal (1999–2002); Acting Deputy Director of the U.S. Information Agency; Public Affairs Counselor at the American Embassy in Brussels, Belgium; Cultural Attaché at the American Embassy in Athens, Greece; and Director of the American Press and Cultural Center in Istanbul, Turkey.

Her numerous awards include The Director General’s Cup for the Foreign Service (the most prestigious honor for former foreign service officers), the U.S. Government’s Superior Honor Award and a Meritorious Honor Award for her work in connection with the first Persian Gulf War. She holds a B.S. in International Business from Simmons College (Massachusetts) and an M.A. in Public Diplomacy from the Fletcher School of Law and Diplomacy at Tufts University, as well as four honorary doctorates.

From 2003 to 2006, she served on the Senior Advisory Group of the United States European Command, which was then headed by General James Jones.

Since 2023, Ambassador Harriet Elam-Thomas has served as a Global Advisor for the ACE Global Leaders of Excellence Network, which is a diverse platform of ACE Health Foundation, a 501(c)(3) non-profit organization, for connecting accomplished and successful leaders globally committed to international leadership development, grounded in the premise that focused sharing of knowledge, expertise, and resources increases the probability of productive and powerful outcomes.

A member of the American Academy of Diplomacy, she currently is on the board of the Cultural Academy for Excellence, the Orlando Philharmonic Orchestra and the Institute for International Education. In addition to English, she speaks French, Greek and Turkish.

Diplomatic posts
Preceded by Dane Farnsworth Smith	United States Ambassador to Senegal; 2000–2002	Succeeded by Richard Allen Roth
