= Desiree Leigh Grace =

American federal prosecutor (born 1988)

- Born: 1987 or 1988 (age 38–39); Princeton, New Jersey, U.S.
- Education: University of Maryland, College Park (BA); Seton Hall University (JD)
- Occupation: Federal prosecutor
- Political party: Republican

Desiree Leigh Grace (born 1987 or 1988) is an American federal prosecutor.

== Early life and education ==
Desiree Leigh Grace was born in 1987 or 1988. Grace attended Hopewell Valley Central High School. She graduated from the University of Maryland, College Park and the Seton Hall University School of Law, where she was the managing editor of the Seton Hall Law Review.

== Career ==
Grace clerked for New Jersey Supreme Court chief justice Stuart Rabner and United States Court of Appeals for the Third Circuit judge Morton Ira Greenberg. She was a litigation associate in the product liability and the business litigation practices at McCarter & English for two years.

In 2016, Grace began working in the United States Attorney's Office as an assistant attorney. She was named as the acting head of the violent crimes unit in August 2020, became the acting head of the criminal division two years later, and was named as the permanent head of the criminal division in March 2024. After being sworn in, Alina Habba, the acting United States attorney for the District of New Jersey, appointed Grace as her first assistant in April 2025. She represented the federal government in litigation involving the Newark immigration detention center incident.

By July 2025, Alina Habba, the acting United States attorney for the District of New Jersey, appeared unlikely to be appointed to the position by a panel of judges on the District Court for the District of New Jersey. The judges invoked an authority to appoint Grace as the acting attorney to occupy the vacancy after Habba's term ends while a nominee is confirmed by the United States Senate. Hours later, Grace received an email stating she was fired as First Assistant U.S. attorney; attorney general Pam Bondi announced the move on X. Nonetheless, Grace has asserted on her LinkedIn page that she will accept the position when Habba's term ends "according to the law". On July 24, Habba announced that the Trump administration had withdrawn her nomination, allowing her to become the acting attorney for approximately seven months and denying Grace the position.

== Personal life ==
Grace is a registered Republican.
