= Public commercial assets =

Public commercial assets are the assets owned by the public sector able to generate income if managed professionally.

Public commercial assets are a sub-sector of the asset side of the public sector balance sheet, that reports the totals of assets and liabilities that the government controls.

According to IMF research, total public sector assets have a value equivalent to 2×GDP globally. Net worth (assets minus liabilities) would be equivalent to some 21% of GDP.

Real estate is the single largest segment of all assets, globally. According to 2021 research from McKinsey Global Institute, global net worth has risen as interest rates have fallen, since 2000 mainly due to real estate tripling in value between 2000 and 2020. Most governments do not keep a complete record of all the real estate it owns, thus making it difficult to value, manage or develop and put these assets to their most productive uses.

Government service data is considered a public asset: for example, the United Kingdom's supplier standard for companies supplying software services to government holds that anonymised government service data should be open to public and third-party organisations for further use, including data held within software specifically built for government purposes.
