= Kinshasa Arena =

Indoor arena in the Democratic Republic of the Congo

- Interactive map of Kinshasa Arena
- Address: Kinshasa; Democratic Republic of the Congo
- Capacity: 20,000
- Type: Indoor arena

Construction
- Groundbreaking: 13 October 2023
- Builder: SUMMA

Kinshasa Arena is an indoor arena under construction located in Kinshasa, the Democratic Republic of the Congo. Located next to the Stade des Martyrs and capable of hosting 20,000 people, it will be the largest indoor hall in the country. Ground broke in October 2023 and construction is expected to finish in 2026.

== History ==
The new arena was first announced in 2022 when President Félix Tshisekedi promised the building of a new 20,000-seater arena following the DR Congo men's national team gold medal win in the FIBA AfroCan 2019. The DR Congo signed a memorandum of understanding with Turkish contractor SUMMA, who had earlier built the BK Arena and Dakar Arena in Africa.

Construction officially began on 13 October 2023 and is expected to finish within 36 months.
