= Genta H. Holmes =

American diplomat

20th United States Ambassador to Australia
- In office April 11, 1997 – July 23, 2000
- President: Bill Clinton
- Preceded by: Edward J. Perkins
- Succeeded by: Edward W. Gnehm

1st United States Ambassador to Namibia
- In office 1990–1992
- President: George H. W. Bush
- Preceded by: None
- Succeeded by: Marshall Fletcher McCallie

20th Director General of the Foreign Service
- In office September 7, 1992 – August 18, 1995
- Preceded by: Edward Joseph Perkins
- Succeeded by: Anthony Cecil Eden Quainton

Personal details
- Born: August 3, 1940 (age 86) Anadarko, Oklahoma, U.S.
- Education: University of Southern California (BA); London School of Economics

Genta Hawkins Holmes (born September 3, 1940) is an American foreign service officer who served as ambassador to Namibia and Australia. In addition, she has served as a "Diplomat-in-Residence" at the University of California, Davis.

== Early life and education ==
Holmes graduated from high school at Huntington Park High School, Huntington Park, California, in 1958. She received her B.A. in International Relations magna cum laude from the University of Southern California in 1962 and pursued graduate studies at the London School of Economics and Political Science on a Rotary International Fellowship from 1962 to 1963.

== Career ==
During her career at the U.S. State Department, she was the first U.S. Ambassador to Namibia and later served as Ambassador to Australia. From 1992 to 1995 she was the Director General of the Foreign Service and Director of Personnel at the State Department. During her career in the Foreign Service, other assignments included:

- Working for Congress as an American Political Science Association Fellow (1977–1978). She was the first woman selected for this position.
- Assistant Administrator for Legislative Affairs at the U.S. Agency for International Development (1979)
- Deputy Chief of Mission at the U.S. Embassy in Port-au-Prince, Haiti during a tense and violent period (1986–1988)
- Deputy Chief of Mission in the U.S. Embassy in South Africa at the time of the transition (1989–1990)
- Deputy Chief of Mission in Malawi 1984–1986
- Chief of the Economic/Commercial Section at the American Embassy in Nassau, Bahamas
- U.S. Embassy in Paris
- U.S. Embassy in Abidjan, Côte d'Ivoire

Ambassador Holmes speaks French, and holds both the Presidential and a Superior Honor Awards of the Department of State. She is married to Michael Dayton Holmes, a former Marine and Vietnam veteran.

Diplomatic posts
Preceded by None	U.S. Ambassador to Namibia; 1990–1992	Succeeded by Marshall Fletcher McCallie
Preceded by Edward J. Perkins	U.S. Ambassador to Australia; 1997–2000	Succeeded by Edward William Gnehm Jr.
