= Marshall Fletcher McCallie =

American diplomat

2nd United States Ambassador to Namibia
- In office 1993–1996
- President: George H. W. Bush
- Preceded by: Genta H. Holmes
- Succeeded by: George F. Ward

Personal details
- Born: June 21, 1945 (age 81) Chattanooga, Tennessee
- Education: Vanderbilt University

Marshall Fletcher McCallie (born June 21, 1945) is a former United States Ambassador to Namibia.

== Early life and education ==
McCallie was born in Chattanooga, Tennessee and attended the McCallie School. He earned his B.A. degree from Vanderbilt University in 1967, and his M.A. degree from the Fletcher School of Law and Diplomacy at Tufts University in 1974.

== Career ==
McCallie served in the U.S. Air Force from 1967–1971. Later he served in various posts in the U.S. State Department, particularly in Africa. He was appointed United States Ambassador to Namibia by President George H. W. Bush in 1992 and he served in this position from 1993 – 1996.

=== Other diplomatic posts ===
- 1986 – 1988: Director of the Junior Officer Division with the Bureau of Personnel
- 1988 – 1990: Deputy Chief of Mission at the U.S. Embassy in Lusaka, Zambia

== Personal life ==
McCallie retired in 2002 and resides in Brevard, North Carolina with his wife Amye.

Diplomatic posts
Preceded by Genta H. Holmes	United States Ambassador to Namibia; 1993–1996	Succeeded by George F. Ward
