= List of ambassadors of the United States to Senegal =

Ambassador of the United States to Senegal
- Seal of the United States Department of State

- Flag of a United States ambassador

- Incumbent; Jennifer Davis-Paguada; Chargé d'affaires since January 20, 2026
- Appointer: The president; with the advice and consent of the Senate
- Inaugural holder: Henry Serrano Villard as Ambassador Extraordinary and Plenipotentiary
- Formation: October 8, 1960
- Website: U.S. Embassy - Dakar

The United States ambassador to Senegal is the official representative of the president of the United States to the head of state of Senegal. The ambassador is concurrently the ambassador to Guinea-Bissau, while residing in Dakar, Senegal.

== Ambassadors and chiefs of mission ==
Name	Career status	Appointed	Presentation of credentials	Termination of mission
Henry Serrano Villard	Career FSO	October 8, 1960	October 31, 1960	Left post, April 30, 1961
Philip Mayer Kaiser	Political appointee	June 22, 1961	July 20, 1961	Left post, May 18, 1964
Mercer Cook	Political appointee	July 9, 1964	August 29, 1964	Left post, July 1, 1966
William Robert Rivkin	Political appointee	October 13, 1966	December 16, 1966	Died at post, March 19, 1967
Lewis Dean Brown	Career FSO	October 18, 1967	December 22, 1967	Left post, August 15, 1970
G. Edward Clark	Political appointee	October 12, 1970	November 18, 1970	Left post, October 16, 1973
Orison Rudolph Aggrey	Career FSO	November 23, 1973	January 17, 1974	Left post, July 10, 1977
Herman Jay Cohen	Career FSO	June 24, 1977	July 22, 1977	Left post, July 21, 1980
Walter C. Carrington	Political appointee	August 27, 1980	October 16, 1980	Left post, March 3, 1981
Charles William Bray	Career FSO	June 30, 1981	July 18, 1981	Left post, May 17, 1985
Lannon Walker	Career FSO	July 12, 1985	August 7, 1985	Left post, August 18, 1988
George Edward Moose	Career FSO	April 28, 1988	October 13, 1988	Left post, May 21, 1991
Katherine Shirley	Career FSO	March 25, 1991	June 5, 1991	Left post, September 1, 1992
Mark Johnson	Career FSO	May 25, 1993	June 22, 1993	Left post, June 15, 1996
Dane Farnsworth Smith	Career FSO	June 11, 1996	September 16, 1996	Left post, July 16, 1999
Harriet L. Elam-Thomas	Career FSO	November 16, 1999	January 14, 2000	Left post, December 6, 2002
Richard Allen Roth	Career FSO	November 15, 2002	February 13, 2004	Left post, August 4, 2005
Janice L. Jacobs	Career FSO	February 21, 2006	April 14, 2006	Left post, July 15, 2007
Marcia Bernicat	Career FSO	June 6, 2008	August 6, 2008	July 15, 2011
Lewis A. Lukens	Career FSO	July 11, 2011	August 11, 2011	Left post, June 4, 2014
James P. Zumwalt	Career FSO	November 19, 2014	February 3, 2015	Left post, January 20, 2017
Tulinabo S. Mushingi	Career FSO	February 28, 2017	August 4, 2017	February 1, 2022
Michael A. Raynor	Career FSO	December 18, 2021	March 10, 2022	January 15, 2026

== See also ==
- Senegal – United States relations
- Foreign relations of Senegal
- Ambassadors of the United States
