= Kinshasa Financial Center =

- French: Centre Financier de Kinshasa
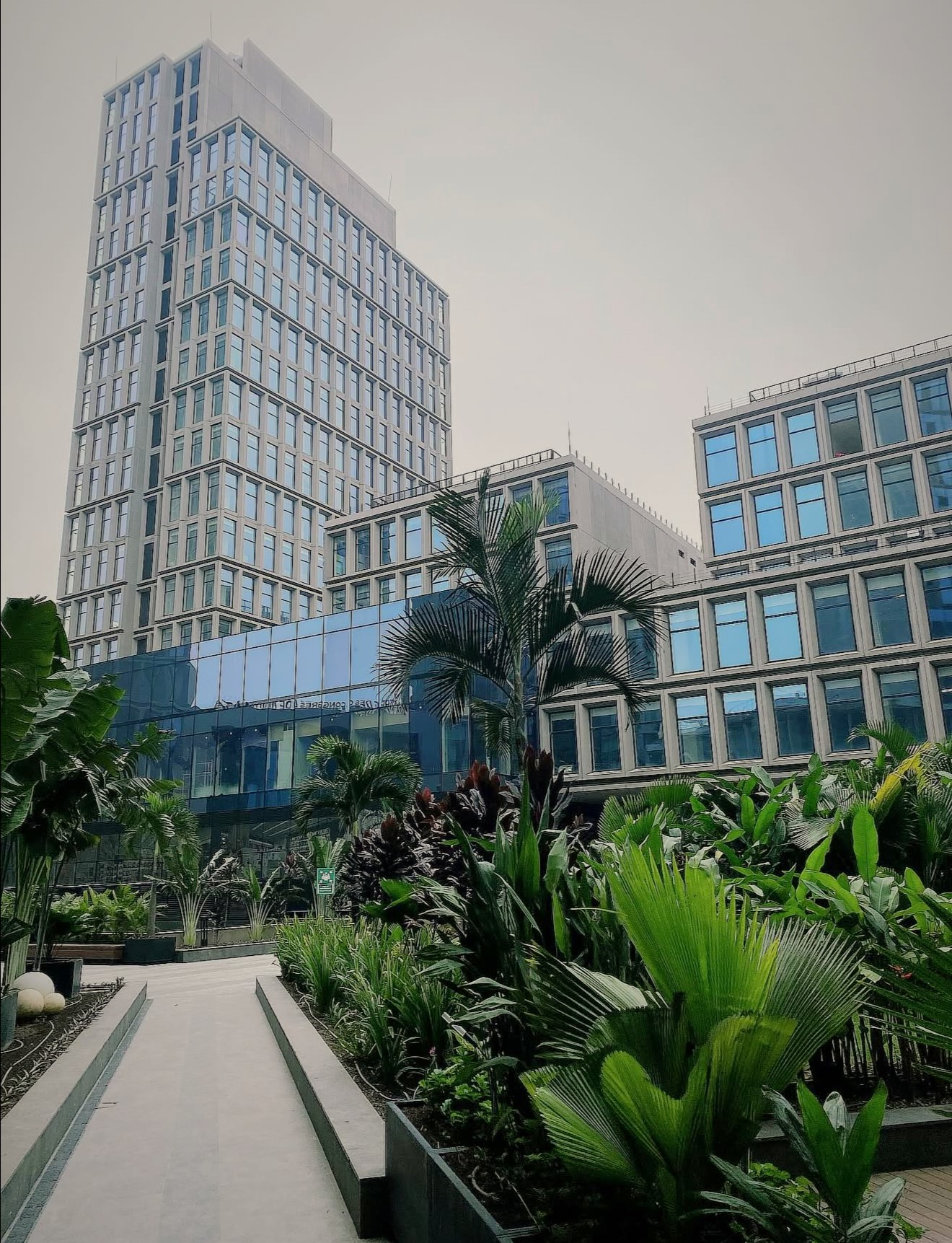

General information
- Architectural style: Modern
- Location: Gombe, Kinshasa, Democratic Republic of the Congo
- Coordinates: 4°18′34″S 15°16′49″E
- Construction started: February 2022; 4 years ago
- Completed: 19 December 2023; 2 years ago
- Inaugurated: 19 December 2023; 2 years ago
- Cost: $290 million

Technical details
- Floor area: 41,000 m^{2} (440,000 sq ft)

Design and construction
- Architect: Tabanlıoğlu Architects

Other information
- Parking: 1,100

The Kinshasa Financial Center (French: Centre Financier de Kinshasa) is a financial hub strategically located in the Gombe commune of Kinshasa, in the western region of the Democratic Republic of the Congo. Covering a total area of 41,000 square meters, it is the largest financial center in the DRC. The center houses the offices of the Ministry of Finance and Budget; the general directorates of the country's financial revenue agencies; the General Inspectorate of Finance; the General Secretariat for Finance; the Development Bank; as well as conference rooms and lecture halls.

Commissioned by President Félix Tshisekedi in February 2022, the center was inaugurated on 19 December 2023. It was constructed by Milvest, a Turkish company affiliated with Miller Holding.

== History ==
=== Construction ===
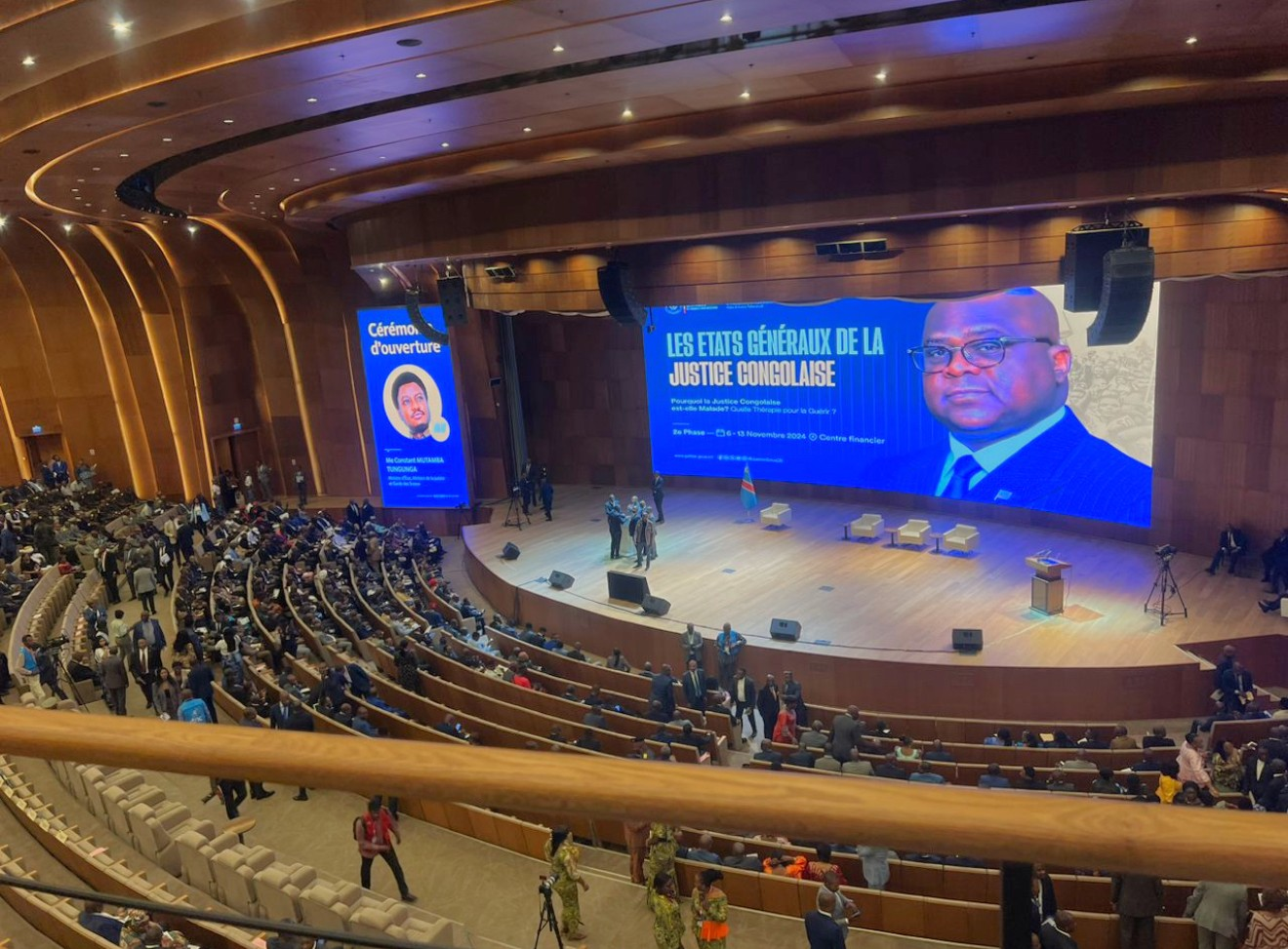
Interior view

In February 2022, Turkish President Recep Tayyip Erdoğan visited the DRC as a part of Turkey–DRC bilateral relationship. During his visit, Erdogan signed several deals on security, defense, and infrastructure with the country. A conspicuous facet of these accords involved the participation of the Turkish construction firm Milvest, which the DRC pre-financed $290 million for constructing the Kinshasa Financial Center. The construction commenced in June 2022 in the Gombe commune near a Turkish English International School, with an additional investment of $60 million for an affiliated hotel, which will be transferred to the DRC after a 49-year Turkish tenure. The project employed around 3,000 workers, including 1,800 Congolese and 1,200 Turkish workers.

The center was initially envisioned to span 18 months, featuring a skyline with twin towers of more than fifteen levels opposite the Courthouse. The first 20-story twin tower houses the Ministries of Finance at 107 meters, while the second 16-story twin tower accommodates the Ministries of Budget at a height of 90 meters. Parenthetically, the structures include a 16-story Finance Center at 78 meters, a 5-story government edifice, a 5-story Ministry of Technology tax office and data center, a 13-story, 66-meter 5-star hotel, and two office buildings with a helipad. The architectural plan also incorporates catering and retail spaces, two ultra-modern auditoriums within the Kinshasa Congress Center, boasting a capacity for 3,000 attendees across 3,500 square meters, as well as green spaces, a swimming pool, a water feature, and two parking facilities capable of accommodating 1,100 vehicles.

The state-owned Strategic Investment Fund (Fonds d'Investissements Stratégique) was expected to manage and maximize the value of these assets.

=== Unveiling ===
On 19 December 2023, amid the general election, the Kinshasa Financial Center was unveiled alongside other buildings at Université Pédagogique Nationale and Kinshasa General Hospital. During the inauguration ceremony, an underground parking lot was introduced to the public.
