= List of ambassadors of the United States to Namibia =

Ambassador of the United States to Namibia
- Seal of the United States Department of State

- Flag of a United States ambassador

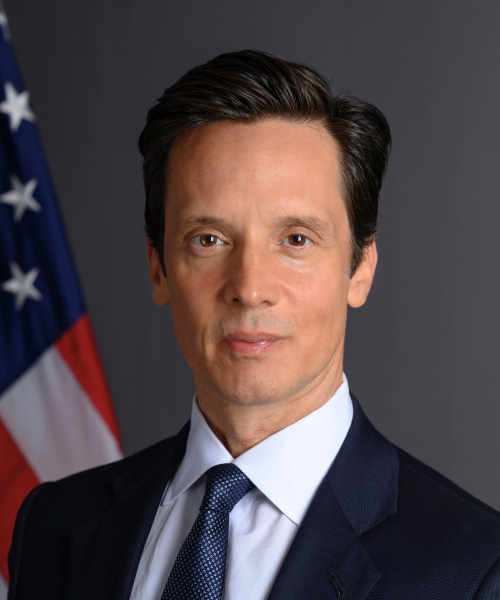
- Incumbent; John Giordano since October 29, 2025
- Nominator: The president of the United States
- Appointer: The president with Senate advice and consent
- Inaugural holder: Genta H. Holmes as Ambassador Extraordinary and Plenipotentiary
- Formation: August 6, 1990
- Website: na.usembassy.gov

The United States ambassador to Namibia is the representative of the government of the United States in Namibia.

The position was created the day Namibia became independent, March 21, 1990, which was also the day that Namibia-United States relations were established. On that same day, the U.S. Embassy in Windhoek was opened in recognition of the establishment of diplomatic relations.

The U.S. Liaison Office in Windhoek opened February 24, 1984, with William H. Twaddell as Director and closed February 15, 1985. During this time the following officers served as Director: Dennis Whyte Keogh (March–April 1984), Howard Jeter (April–May 1984), and William L. Jacobsen Jr. (May 1984–February 1985). It reopened on June 1, 1989, with Roger A. McGuire as Director. McGuire became chargé d'affaires ad interim when the Liaison Office was elevated to embassy status on March 21, 1990. The first ambassador, Genta H. Holmes was appointed on August 6, 1990. The United States has maintained diplomatic relations with Namibia since that time.

== Ambassadors ==
Name	Title	Appointed	Presented credentials	Terminated mission	Notes
Genta H. Holmes – Career FSO	Ambassador Extraordinary and Plenipotentiary	August 6, 1990	August 30, 1990	September 6, 1992	
Marshall Fletcher McCallie – Career FSO	Ambassador Extraordinary and Plenipotentiary	May 25, 1993	July 7, 1993	July 12, 1996	
George F. Ward – Career FSO	Ambassador Extraordinary and Plenipotentiary	June 11, 1996	August 21, 1996	March 14, 1999	
Jeffrey A. Bader – Career FSO	Ambassador Extraordinary and Plenipotentiary	August 9, 1999	October 13, 1999	April 6, 2001	
Kevin Joseph McGuire – Career FSO	Ambassador Extraordinary and Plenipotentiary	October 1, 2001	November 21, 2001	July 16, 2004	
Joyce A. Barr – Career FSO	Ambassador Extraordinary and Plenipotentiary	July 2, 2004	October 27, 2004	July 31, 2007	
Gail D. Mathieu – Career FSO	Ambassador Extraordinary and Plenipotentiary	November 15, 2007	November 21, 2007	September 4, 2010	
Wanda L. Nesbitt – Career FSO	Ambassador Extraordinary and Plenipotentiary	September 24, 2010	November 24, 2010	November 15, 2013	
Thomas F. Daughton – Career FSO	Ambassador Extraordinary and Plenipotentiary	September 18, 2014	November 26, 2014	December 21, 2017	
Lisa A. Johnson – Career FSO	Ambassador Extraordinary and Plenipotentiary	November 21, 2017	February 21, 2018	July 2, 2021	
Randy W. Berry – Career FSO	Ambassador Extraordinary and Plenipotentiary	September 20, 2022	February 9, 2023	December 31, 2024	
Brandon Hudspeth – Career FSO	Chargé d'affaires ad interim	January 1, 2025		October 28, 2025	
John Giordano – Political appointee	Ambassador Extraordinary and Plenipotentiary	October 7, 2025	October 29, 2025	Present	

== See also ==
- Namibia – United States relations
- Foreign relations of Namibia
- Ambassadors of the United States
