= The McCallie School =

Prep school in Chattanooga, Tennessee, US

Location
- 500 Dodds Ave; Chattanooga, Tennessee; United States; 35.0272391°N 85.2656187°W

Information
- Type: Private; College-preparatory; day; boarding school
- Motto: Man's chief end is to glorify God and to enjoy Him forever.
- Religious affiliation: Non-denominational Christianity
- Established: 1905
- Sister school: Girls Preparatory School
- Head of school: Arthur Lee Burns III
- Grades: 6–12
- Gender: All-boys
- Campus: 120 acres (48.6 ha)
- Campus type: Suburban
- Colors: Blue & White
- Fight song: "On, McCallie" by William T. Purdy ("On, Wisconsin!")
- Mascot: Blue Tornado
- Nickname: Blue Tornadoes
- Rival: Baylor School
- Publication: The Argonaut
- Newspaper: The Tornado
- Yearbook: The Pennant
- Tuition: Middle School day: $37,340; Upper school day: $38,800; Boarding (domestic): $74,600; Boarding (international): $81,050
- Website: www.mccallie.org

McCallie School is a private, all-boys, college-preparatory school located on Missionary Ridge in Chattanooga, Tennessee, United States. Established in 1905, the school has students in grades 6 through 12 in both day and boarding programs.

== History ==
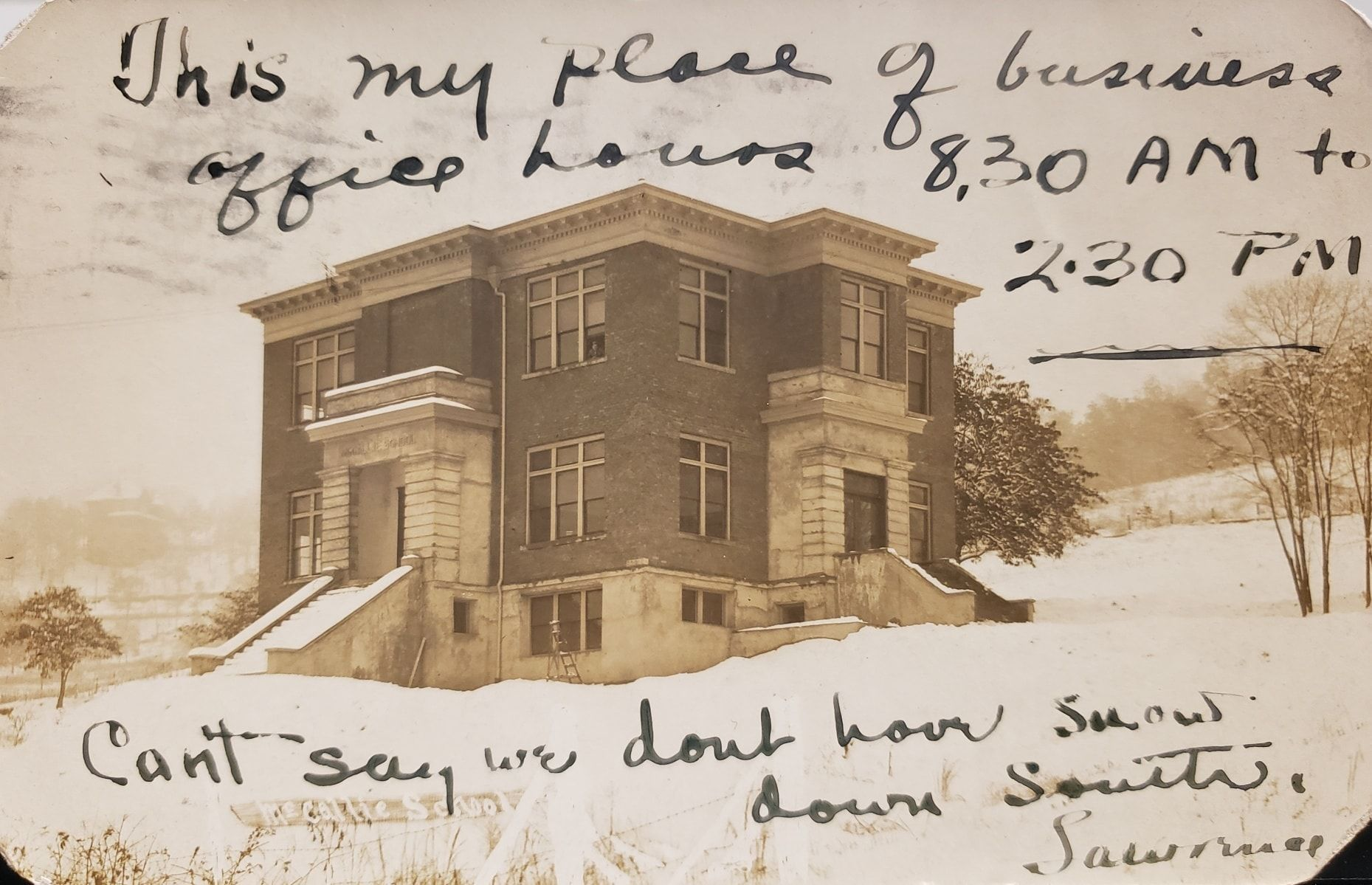
Original school building, 1906/07

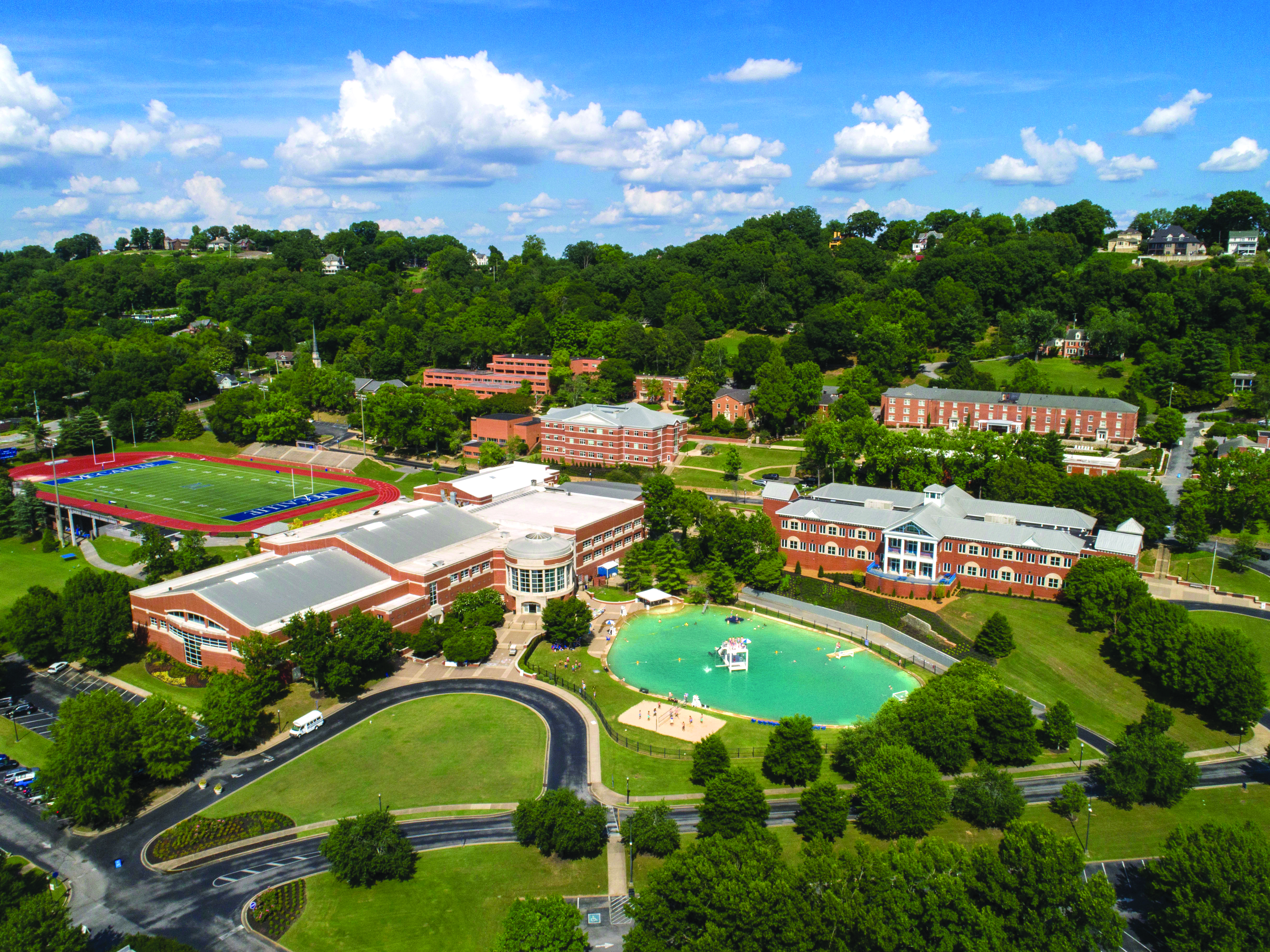
Aerial view of campus

Brothers Spencer Jarnigan and James "Park" McCallie founded the school in 1905, which remained under the control of the family until a board of trustees assumed management of the school in 1937.

Founded as an all-boys school, McCallie became a military school in the wake of World War I. In 1970, McCallie dropped its military program as a result of admission challenges during the Vietnam War.

Like most schools in Tennessee, the McCallie School was formerly racially segregated. While the school's board of trustees agreed to allow the admission of African-American students beginning with day students in 1969 and boarding students in 1970, the school did not admit its first African-American student until 1971.

McCallie has a close relationship with Girls Preparatory School (GPS). One of the co-founders of GPS was Grace McCallie, sister to Spencer and Park.

== Drama collection ==
Donated to the theater department, the Scott Langley '68 Drama Collection is a collection of plays and theater history books, located in the rehearsal room. Langley graduated as valedictorian from McCallie in 1968. He was involved in theater and swimming during his time at McCallie.

== Rankings ==
In 2016, McCallie was ranked as the top private high school in the state of Tennessee by Business Insider. In Niche's 2023 high school report, McCallie was ranked the number one boarding high school and best high school for athletes in Tennessee. Nationally, McCallie was ranked the 35th best overall all-boys high school and 123rd of 418 best boarding high schools.

== Summer programs ==
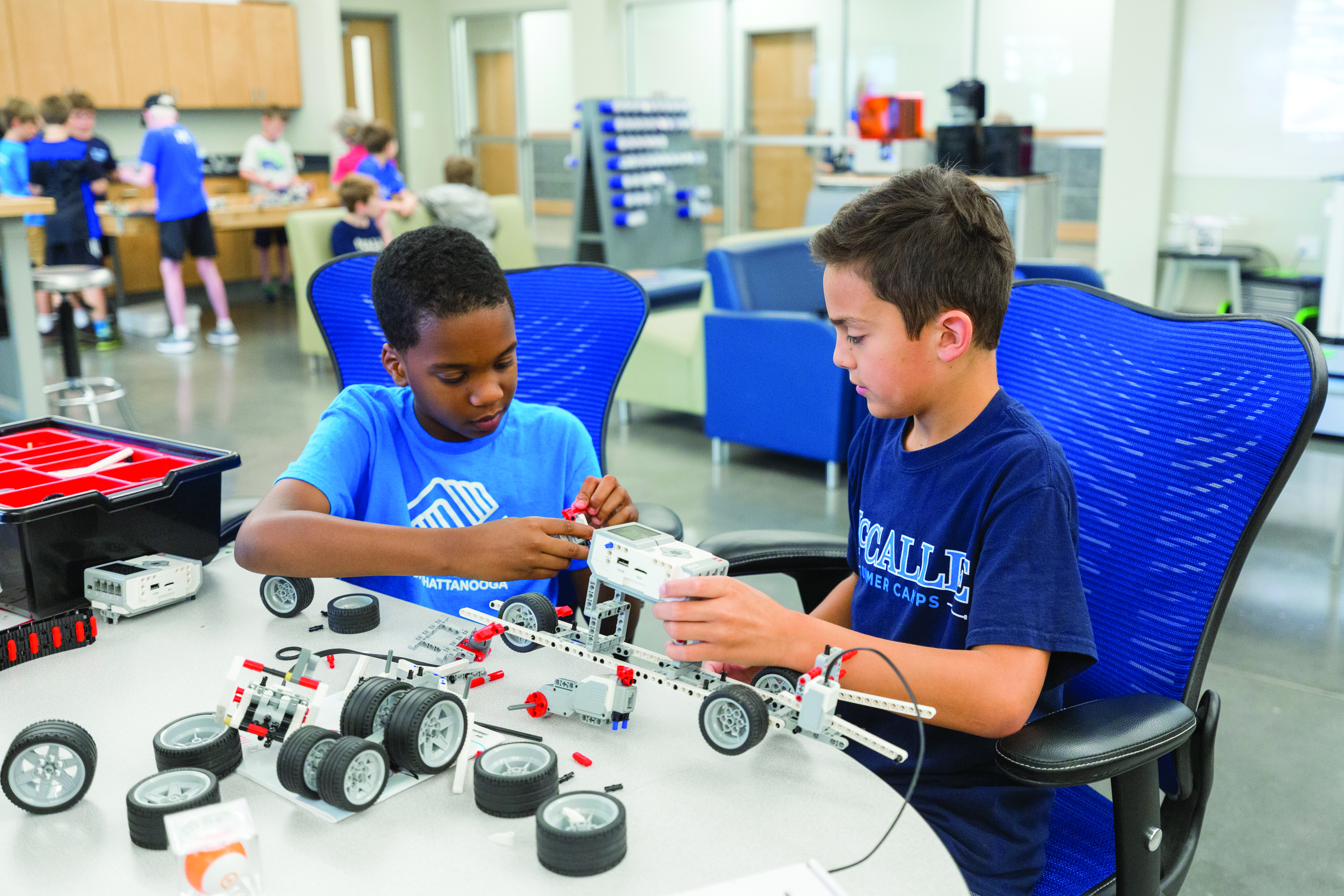
Day & boarding camps

McCallie School has seven boarding camps.

== Notable alumni ==
- Eric Rivers '2021: wide receiver for the Tampa Bay Buccaneers
- Sean Ryan '2010: Olympic swimmer
- Michael Bingham '04: Olympic medalist in track and field
- Evan Power '00: chairman of the Republican Party of Florida and member of the Republican National Committee
- Jon Meacham '87: writer, former editor of Newsweek, contributing editor at Time
- Giovanni Alberto Agnelli '82: CEO of Fiat Group
- Zach Wamp '76: former member of the United States House of Representatives of Tennessee
- Marshall Fletcher McCallie '63: United States ambassador to Namibia
- Carroll A. Campbell, Jr. '58: former governor of South Carolina
- Ted Turner '56: founder of CNN and Turner Broadcasting System, former owner of Atlanta Braves, Atlanta Hawks, and Atlanta Thrashers
- Bill Brock '49: former United States senator and Secretary of Labor
- Preston Henn '49: founder of the Fort Lauderdale Swap Shop and race car driver
- Pat Robertson '46: televangelist and founder and chairman of the Christian Broadcasting Network
- Howard Baker Jr. '43: former Senate Majority Leader, White House Chief of Staff, and Ambassador to Japan
- John M. Belk '39: president of Belk Department Stores, Inc. and former mayor of Charlotte, North Carolina
- Sonny Montgomery '39: former member of United States House of Representatives for Mississippi
- James Rhyne Killian '21: former president of Massachusetts Institute of Technology
- Ralph McGill '17: former editor of the Atlanta Constitution
- Kyle Testerman: mayor of Knoxville, Tennessee
- Stephen H. Phillips: Emeritus Professor of Philosophy and Asian Studies at the University of Texas at Austin
