= Selden Chapin =

American diplomat (1899–1963)

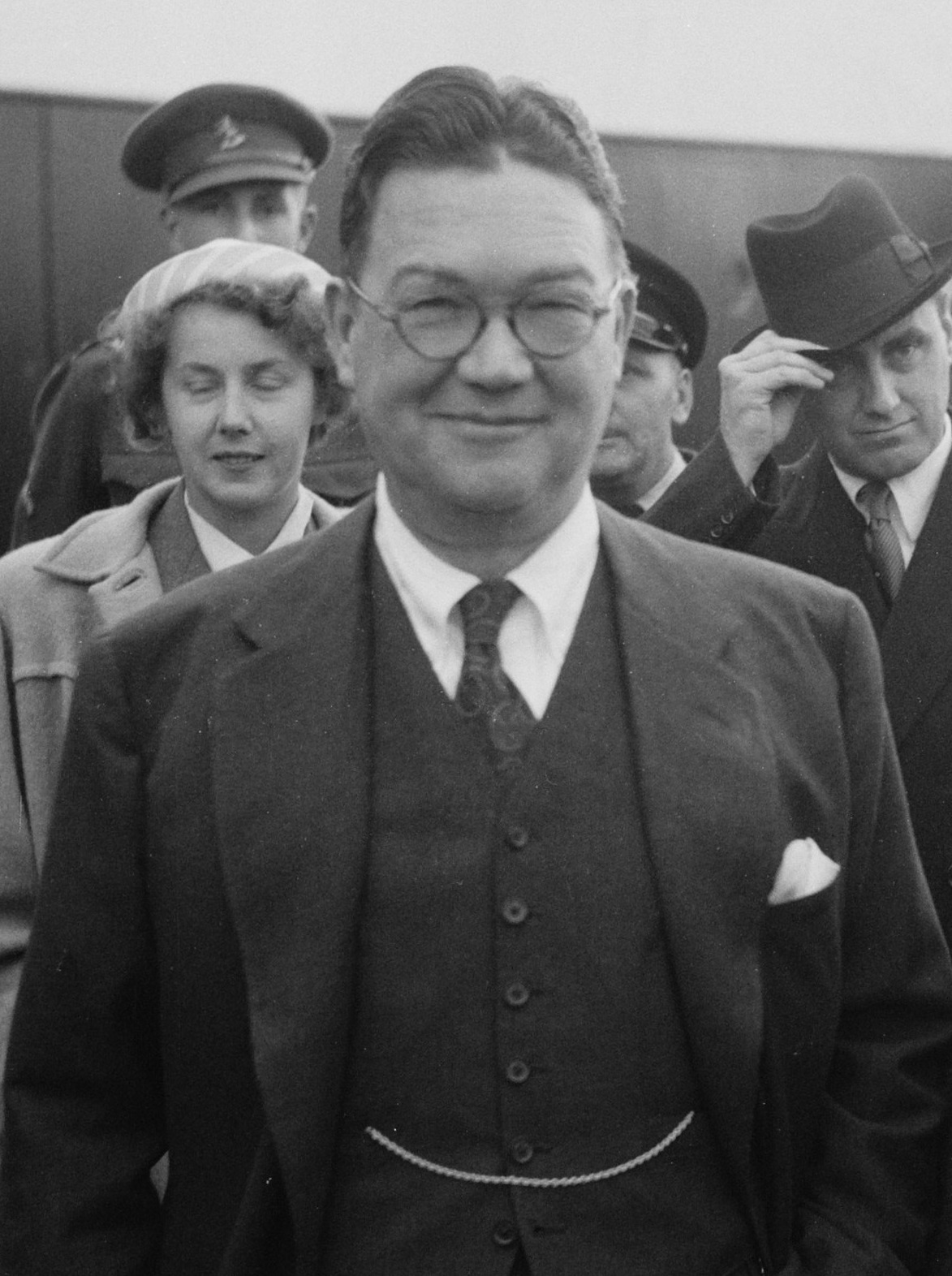
- Chapin in the Netherlands in 1951

1st Director General of the Foreign Service
- In office November 13, 1946 – April 30, 1947
- Preceded by: Position established
- Succeeded by: Christian M. Ravndal

United States Ambassador to Peru
- In office May 7, 1960 – August 7, 1960
- President: Dwight D. Eisenhower
- Preceded by: Theodore Achilles
- Succeeded by: James Loeb

United States Ambassador to Iran
- In office 1955–1958
- President: Dwight D. Eisenhower
- Preceded by: Loy W. Henderson
- Succeeded by: Edward T. Wailes

United States Ambassador to Panama
- In office January 2, 1954 – May 29, 1955
- President: Dwight D. Eisenhower
- Preceded by: John C. Wiley
- Succeeded by: Julian F. Harrington

United States Ambassador to the Netherlands
- In office October 27, 1949 – October 30, 1953
- President: Harry S. Truman; Dwight D. Eisenhower
- Preceded by: Herman B. Baruch
- Succeeded by: H. Freeman Matthews

United States Ambassador to Hungary
- In office July 9, 1947 – February 17, 1949
- President: Harry S. Truman
- Preceded by: H. F. Arthur Schoenfeld
- Succeeded by: Nathaniel P. Davis

Personal details
- Born: September 19, 1899 Erie, Pennsylvania, U.S.
- Died: March 26, 1963 (aged 63)
- Resting place: Arlington National Cemetery
- Spouse: Mary Paul Noyes (m. 1927)
- Children: Frederic L. Chapin; Helen Chapin Metz
- Relatives: Hope Cooke (niece and ward)
- Education: United States Naval Academy
- Occupation: Diplomat

Military service
- Branch/service: United States Navy
- Years of service: 1919–1925

Selden Chapin (September 19, 1899 – March 26, 1963) was a career foreign service officer and United States diplomat.

== Biography ==
Selden Chapin was born in Erie, Pennsylvania, the son of Captain Frederic Lincoln Chapin (who was commander of the battleship Wyoming) and his wife Grace Card (Selden) Chapin. He graduated from the United States Naval Academy in 1919 and served in the U.S. Navy from 1919 to 1925. He married Mary Paul Noyes, March 30, 1927.

He was appointed a foreign service officer in March 1925. After the liberation of Paris in August 1944, he served as Chargé d'Affaires in the American Embassy in the absence of an ambassador, since France formally broke off diplomatic relations with the U.S. after the Torch Invasion of North Africa in November 1942. Jefferson Caffery assumed the ambassadorship on 30 December 1944. Later Chapin was the U.S. ambassador to Hungary, Iran, Netherlands, Peru and Panama. Chapin and his wife are interred in Arlington National Cemetery.

His son was Frederic L. Chapin, ambassador to Ethiopia and Guatemala, and his daughter was Middle East analyst Helen Chapin Metz. His niece and ward is Hope Cooke, former wife of the last king of Sikkim, Palden Thondup Namgyal.

Diplomatic posts
| Preceded by H.F. Arthur Schoenfeld | Envoy Extraordinary and Minister Plenipotentiary to Hungary; 1947–1949 | Succeeded by Nathaniel P. Davis |
| Preceded by Herman B. Baruch | United States Ambassador to the Netherlands; October 27, 1949 – October 30, 1953 | Succeeded by H. Freeman Matthews |
| Preceded by John C. Wiley | United States Ambassador to Panama; January 2, 1954 – May 29, 1955 | Succeeded by Julian F. Harrington |
| Preceded by Loy W. Henderson | United States Ambassador to Iran; 1955–1958 | Succeeded by Edward T. Wailes |
| Preceded by Theodore Achilles | United States Ambassador to Peru; May 7, 1960 – August 7, 1960 | Succeeded by James Loeb |
