= Sikkim: Requiem for a Himalayan Kingdom =

2015 book by Andrew Duff

- Editors: Andrew Duff
- Language: English
- Subject: History
- Genre: Nonfiction
- Published: 2015
- Publisher: Random House India
- Media type: Hardcover
- Pages: 380
- ISBN: 978-8184006964

Sikkim: Requiem for a Himalayan Kingdom is a nonfiction book by Andrew Duff.

== Overview ==
The book provides the historical account of Sikkim's annexation by India, its last king Palden Thondup Namgyal and his American wife Hope Cooke. Over the course of ten chapters, Duff explores the politics, plots, and broader regional and political forces that led to the end of the 333-year-long rule of the Chogyals.

== Reception ==
Writing for DNA India, Iftikhar Gilani in his review suggests that the book, "...highlights how India seldom shied from using force when its security – especially territorial – is threatened."

University of Tartu's Kikee Doma Bhutia in her review for Nanzan University's Asian Ethnology journal writes, "What his book showcases, in a way, is the emergence of an identity crisis. While the Chogyal was trying to maintain Sikkim’s unique identity as a Buddhist kingdom that is religiously and culturally close to Tibet, during the British era Sikkim’s population changed. More and more Nepalese settled in Sikkim, whose language and culture was closely ailiated not with Tibet, but with India."

Ranjit Gupta, a former Indian diplomat and member of Indian Foreign Service writes for the Institute of Peace and Conflict Studies, "Duff begins skating on thinner ice as he starts writing about political issues; as this part of the book unfolds, given Duff’s many visits to Sikkim and his meetings with a very wide cross section of people, he could have done a much better job by a more balanced presentation rather than mainly and somewhat uncritically adopting the narrative of people who were very obviously very pro-Chogyal almost wholesale."
