= Helen Chapin Metz =

American editor and Middle East analyst (1928–2011)

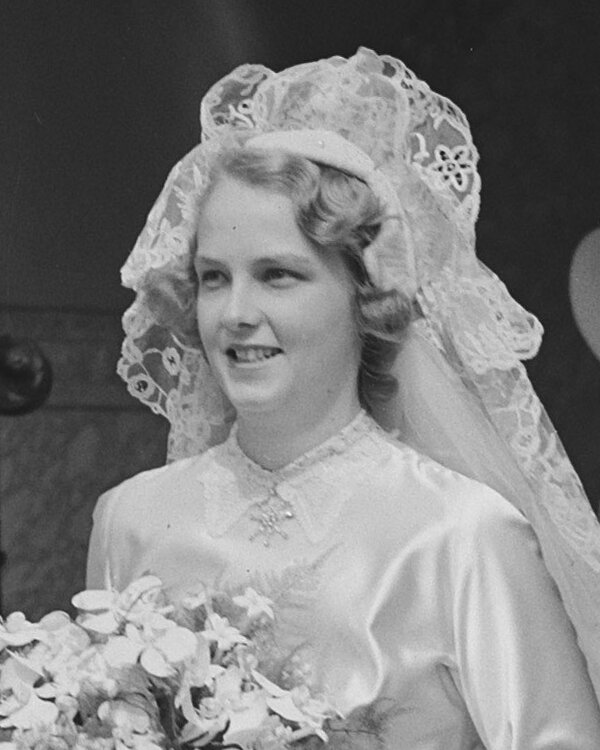
- Chapin Metz at her wedding in 1951
- Born: Helen Chapin; April 12, 1928; Peking, Republic of China
- Died: May 13, 2011 (aged 83); Washington, D.C., United States
- Education: Potomac School; Madeira School; Vassar College; American University of Beirut
- Occupations: Editor; Middle East analyst
- Employer: Federal Research Division
- Spouse: Ronald Irvin Metz (m. 1951)
- Father: Selden Chapin
- Relatives: Frederic L. Chapin (brother); Hope Cooke (cousin)

Helen Chapin Metz (April 12, 1928 – May 13, 2011) was an American editor and Middle East analyst.

== Life ==
Helen Chapin was born on April 12, 1928, in Peking, China. She was the daughter of diplomat Selden Chapin and Mary Paul Noyes. Her brother, Frederic L. Chapin, would also become a diplomat. She was educated at the Potomac School, the Madeira School, Vassar College, graduating in 1949, and the American University of Beirut.

She married Rev. Ronald Irvin Metz on July 14, 1951, in The Hague, Netherlands. The couple settled in Washington, D. C., as they both had jobs in the federal government.

Metz worked for the Federal Research Division of the Library of Congress, editing 15 Library of Congress Country Study handbooks.

She died in Washington, D.C., on May 13, 2011.

== Works ==
- (ed.) Iran: a country study. 4th ed. Washington, D.C.: Federal Research Division, Library of Congress, 1989.
- (ed.) Libya: a country study. 4th ed. Washington, D.C.: Federal Research Division, Library of Congress, 1989.
- (ed.) Iraq: a country study. 4th ed. Washington, D.C.: Federal Research Division, Library of Congress, 1990.
- (ed.) Israel: a country study. Washington, D.C.: Federal Research Division, Library of Congress, 1990.
- (ed.) Egypt: a country study. 5th ed. Washington, D.C.: Federal Research Division, Library of Congress, 1991.
- (ed.) Jordan: a country study. 4th ed. Washington, D.C.: Federal Research Division, Library of Congress, 1991.
- (ed.) Nigeria: a country study. 5th ed. Washington, D.C.: Federal Research Division, Library of Congress, 1992.
- (ed.) Somalia: a country study. 5th ed. Washington, D.C.: Federal Research Division, Library of Congress, 1992.
- (ed.) Sudan: a country study. 4th ed. Washington, D.C.: Federal Research Division, Library of Congress, 1992.
- (ed.) Saudi Arabia: a country study. 5th ed. Washington, D.C.: Federal Research Division, Library of Congress, 1993.
- (ed.) Somalia: a country study. 4th ed. Washington, D.C.: Federal Research Division, Library of Congress, 1993.
- (ed.) Algeria: a country study. 5th ed. Washington, D.C.: Federal Research Division, Library of Congress, 1994.
- (ed.) Mauritius, 1994. Washington, D.C.: Federal Research Division, Library of Congress, 1994.
- (ed.) Persian Gulf states: country studies. 3rd ed. Washington, D.C.: Federal Research Division, Library of Congress, 1994.
- (ed.) Indian ocean: five island countries. 3rd ed. Washington, D.C.: Federal Research Division, Library of Congress, 1995.
- (ed.) Turkey: a country study. 5th ed. Washington, D.C.: Federal Research Division, Library of Congress, 1996.
- (ed.) Global Terrorism: an Annotated Bibliography. Washington, D.C.: Federal Research Division, Library of Congress, 1997.
- (with Glenn Curtis) The Housing Market in Mexico. Washington, D.C.: Federal Research Division, Library of Congress, 1999.
- (ed.) Dominican Republic and Haiti: country studies. 3rd ed. Washington, D.C.: Federal Research Division, Library of Congress, 2001.
