= United States Department of State Operations Center =

Government operations center

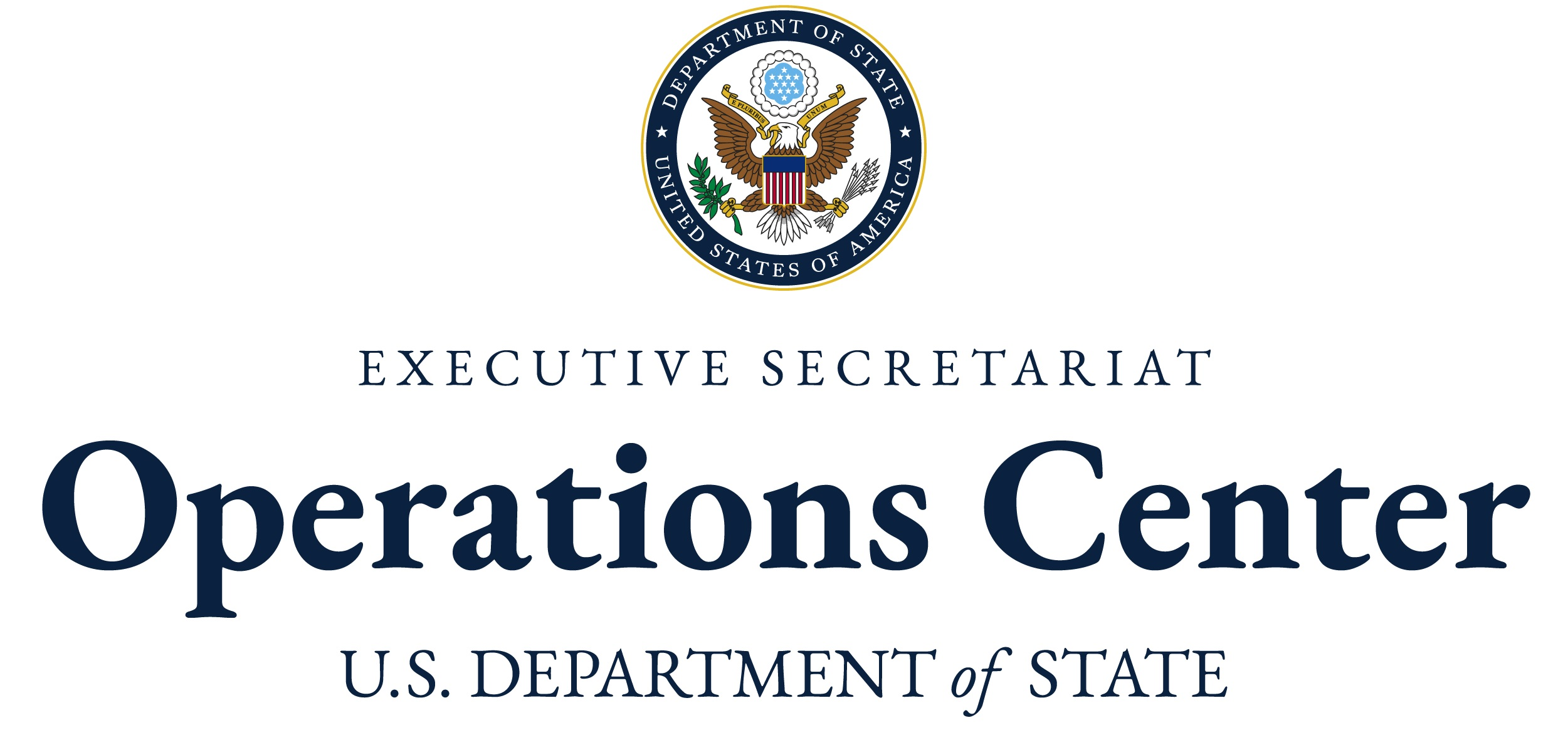

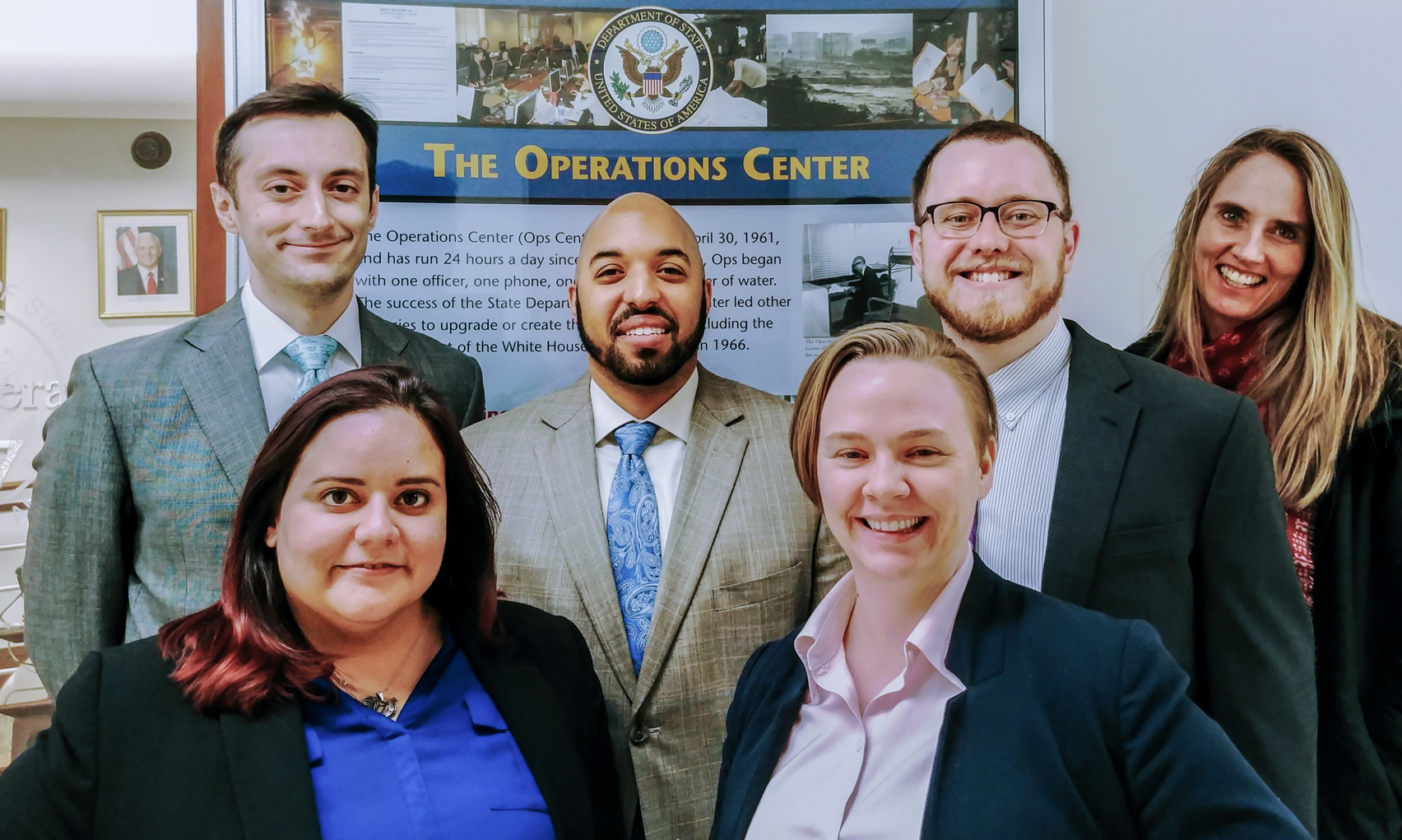
- Members of the Ops team in 2019

Center overview
- Formed: 1961; 65 years ago
- Headquarters: Washington, D.C., U.S.
- Parent department: Executive Secretariat of the Department of State
- Child agencies: The Watch; Crisis Management Support

The United States Department of State’s Operations Center (S/ES-O) monitors world events, prepares written briefs for the secretary of state and other U.S. State Department senior officials, and facilitates communication between the State Department and the rest of the world.

As part of the Executive Secretariat, located in the State Department's headquarters in Washington, D.C., the Operations Center provides senior policymakers with alerts and briefings on world events affecting U.S. interests abroad. The Operations Center is open 24 hours a day, 365 days a year. When a crisis arises, the Operations Center may set up a task force to address logistics and with the Bureau of Consular Affairs held U.S. citizens in need. For example, after the 2010 earthquake in Haiti, the Operations Center convened a task force to assist in coordinating humanitarian response, informing domestic and foreign officials, and aiding American citizens.

== History ==
The Operations Center was founded in 1961 at the instruction of President John F. Kennedy with Theodore C. Achilles as its first director. When the president could not reach anyone at State during the failed Bay of Pigs Invasion, he realized the importance of maintaining a crisis response center. At its inception, only one watch officer staffed the Operations Center supplied with a GI-issue bunk bed, a water pitcher, and a telephone. Since then, the Operations Center has grown with the needs of the secretary of state and the expanding U.S. diplomatic presence around the world.

In 2012, Secretary of State Hillary Clinton described some of her memorable interactions with the Operations Center. In one instance, she called asking to speak with an ambassador visiting Washington. A few minutes later, a Watch Officer connected her. Only later did she learn that the Ambassador did not have his cell phone with him. The Operations Center officers had called the Ambassador’s temporary residence and learned that the concierge had recommended three restaurants, but did not know which one he had chosen. Within minutes, while Clinton remained on the line, the officers dialed the restaurants, circulated a picture of the Ambassador, and requested that the waitstaff scan the premise for his party. A Watch Officer connected the secretary with the ambassador so quickly she was not initially aware of the exhaustive search process. Clinton also highlighted the office's role in rescuing a downed American pilot in Libya. A Libyan man who had received an education grant from the U.S. government found the pilot and called the Operations Center. The Watch Officer then called the U.S. Department of Defense, who promptly arranged his rescue.

== Structure ==
The Operations Center is made up of The Watch and Crisis Management Support.

The Watch

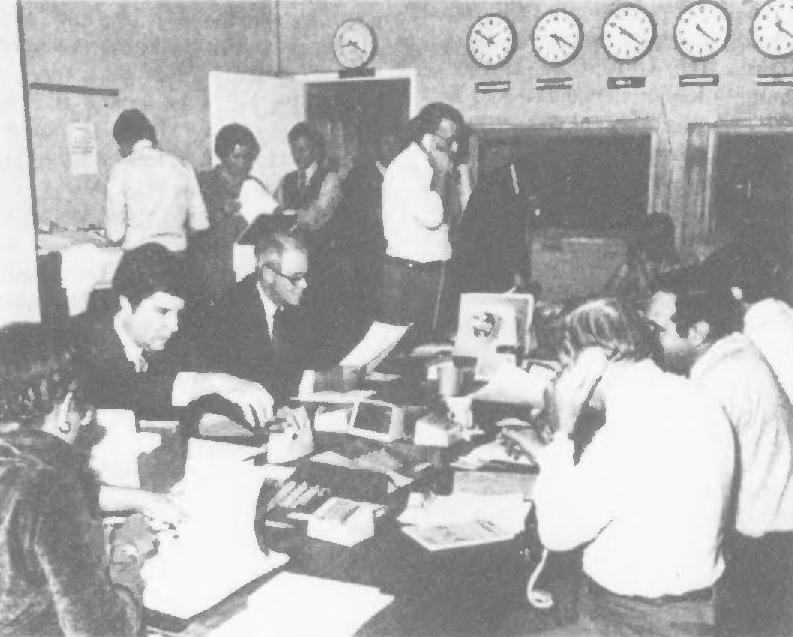
Secretary of State Cyrus Vance works to free hostages in the Operations Center during the Iran hostage crisis, 1979

As of 2010, the Operations Center handled about 340,000 calls annually. It is staffed by Watchstanders who work in shifts to provide coverage around the clock. At any moment, one of the State Department's top leaders might call in requesting information on breaking news stories. These incoming calls overlap with the near constant intake of press and cable traffic. Watchstanders receive and process this information as a team. As Watchstanders receive information, they assess its importance and reach out to embassies and consulates overseas, as well as country desk officers at headquarters, to contextualize the information. The most relevant items are shared with senior officials through daily written and oral briefs.

Crisis Management and Strategy

Officers in Crisis Management and Strategy (CMS) analyze information with an eye towards anticipating future hot spots around the world. By preparing for crises before they arise, CMS helps embassies and consulates abroad adjust their security protocols for any natural disaster or potential source of conflict. When a crisis does happen, CMS oversees tasks forces, managing coordination within the State Department and between interagency actors.

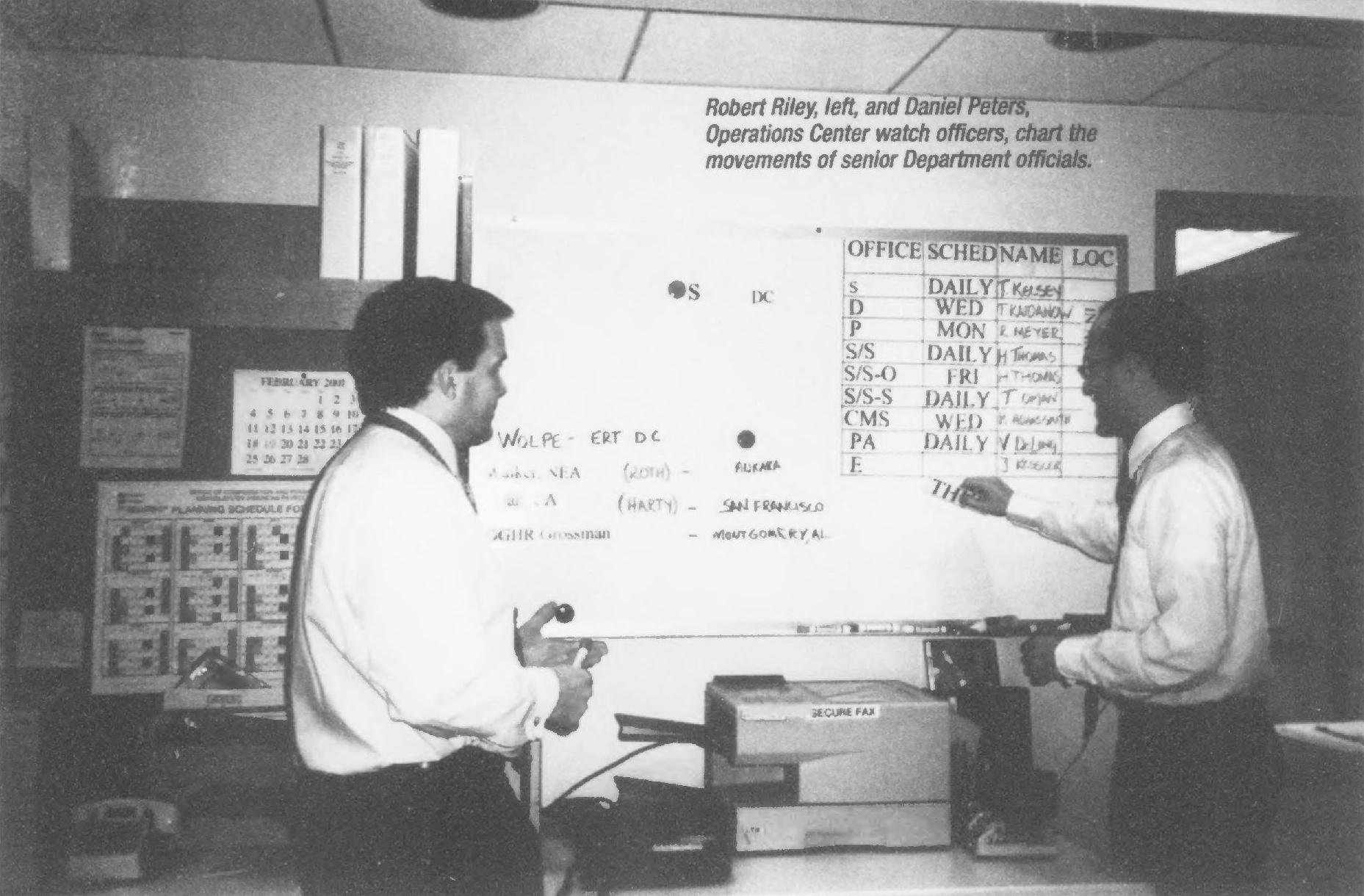
Watch officers chart the movements of State Department officials
