= Joseph L. Rauh Jr. =

American lawyer

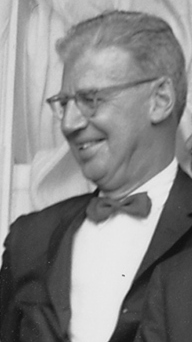
- Rauh, 1963
- Born: January 3, 1911; Cincinnati, Ohio, U.S.
- Died: September 3, 1992 (aged 81); Washington, D.C.
- Education: Harvard University; Harvard Law School
- Spouse: Olie Westheimer (1935–his death)
- Children: B. Michael Rauh, Carl S. Rauh
- Relatives: Louise W. Rauh (sister)

Joseph Louis Rauh Jr. (January 3, 1911 – September 3, 1992) was one of the United States' foremost civil rights and civil liberties lawyers. In his early career, he served as a lawyer in the Franklin D. Roosevelt administration and a clerk to Supreme Court justices Benjamin N. Cardozo and Felix Frankfurter. He co-founded the liberal organization Americans for Democratic Action, and was a key lobbyist for civil rights legislation from the 1940s to 1960s.

He was posthumously awarded the Presidential Medal of Freedom, the nation's highest civilian honor, by President Bill Clinton on November 30, 1993.

== Background ==
Rauh was born in Cincinnati, Ohio, to Jewish parents. His mother, Sarah, was born in the United States. His father who manufactured shirts, was born in Bamberg, Bavaria, Germany. He shirked the textiles business for Harvard University where his older brother had gone to school. His older sister Louise W. Rauh became a physician. In Harvard, he played center for the Ivy League school's basketball team. He graduated magna cum laude with a degree in economics in 1932, continuing his education at Harvard Law School, where he finished first of his class.

== Career ==
Rauh worked with Ben Cohen and Tom Corcoran, both from President Franklin Delano Roosevelt's Brain Trust, writing New Deal legislation, before clerking at the Supreme Court, with Justices Benjamin N. Cardozo and Felix Frankfurter. Frankfurter had mentored him at Harvard Law and helped him to become a clerk for Cardozo. after working as the Deputy Counsel for both the Lend-Lease Administration and the Office of Emergency Management, He and Phil Graham, later the Washington Post publisher, tried to enlist in the Army Air Corps the day after Pearl Harbor. He was commissioned into the Army at the rank of lieutenant in 1942, and soon was detailed to Australia, an administration expert in the midst of World War II. He served in civil affairs in the South Pacific, he and Dick Bolling joining General Douglas MacArthur in the Philippines, both sharing the opinion that MacArthur had surrounded himself with sycophants. He ultimately reached the rank of lieutenant colonel. He returned to Washington after the war and worked in private practice, focusing his efforts on fighting for civil liberties. He was general counsel for labor leader Walter Reuther and the United Auto Workers, handling much of the UAW's civil liberties policy.

=== Civil rights ===
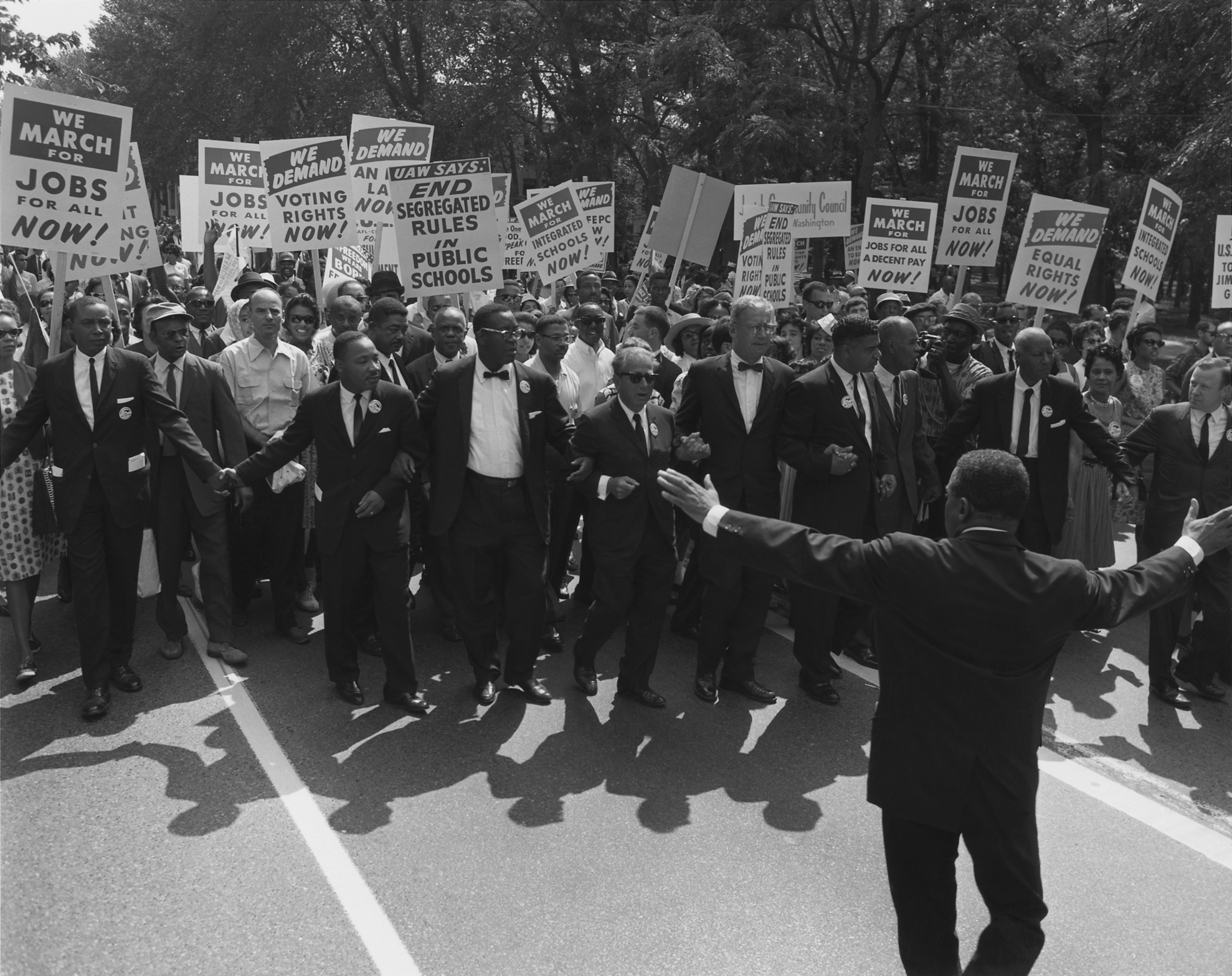
March on Washington on August 28, 1963, showing Joseph L. Rauh Jr. (center), with Martin Luther King Jr. (left), Whitney Young, Roy Wilkins, A. Philip Randolph, Walter Reuther, and Sam Weinblatt.

Rauh is best known for his championing of various civil rights causes.

In 1947, again with Bolling, he helped found Americans for Democratic Action, alongside Eleanor Roosevelt, Walter Reuther, and Hubert Humphrey, among others.

Starting as a Democratic National Convention delegate in July 1948, he was a leader that year in writing up the civil rights plank for Humphrey. In the letter of support promoting his award of the Presidential Medal of Freedom, its authors described the plank as "the foundation for all of the human rights and equal protection laws that have since been enacted."

On September 12, 1948 (a Sunday) at 8:30 PM, Elizabeth Bentley appeared again on the first-ever television broadcast via WNBT of NBC's Meet the Press and was the first interviewed. Journalists included: Nelson Frank, Inez Robb, Cecil Brown, and Lawrence Spivak. Cecil Brown asked her three times whether she would accuse William Remington of being a communist outside of congressional protection, she finally did so. Rauh defended Remington before a Truman Loyalty Review Board.

External videos
- “Eyes on the Prize; Interview with Joseph Rauh” conducted in 1985 for the Eyes on the Prize documentary in which he discusses acting as legal advisor for the Mississippi Freedom Democratic Party (MFDP) and the 1964 Democratic National Convention.

In 1959, Rauh successfully represented Quaker printer David H. Scull before the US Supreme Court in Scull v. Virginia ex rel. Committee on Law Reform & Racial Activities, which concerned aggressive and unclear questioning by the pro-segregation chairman of a Virginia legislative committee, which had led to a contempt citation the Supreme Court overturned.

Rauh also lobbied Congress for the passage of many civil rights bills, having a hand in the passing of the Civil Rights Act of 1964, the Voting Rights Act of 1965, and the Civil Rights Act of 1968. In addition, he fought against McCarthyism and was a long-time executive board member of the National Association for the Advancement of Colored People.

=== Other activities ===
In 1989, Rauh served as the Wayne Morse Chair of Law and Politics, established in honor of the late former Senator, at the University of Oregon.

== Personal life ==
Rauh died in 1992 and was survived by his wife of 57 years, the former Olie Westheimer, and two sons, B. Michael Rauh and Carl S. Rauh and three grandchildren.

His son, Carl S. Rauh, a Columbia University and University of Pennsylvania Law School graduate and lawyer in private practice, served as the United States Attorney for the District of Columbia from 1979 to 1980 and was nominated by President Ronald Reagan as a member of the District of Columbia Judicial Nomination Commission in 1986. His other son, B Michael Rauh, was also a distinguished litigant in Washington, D.C., is the University of the District of Columbia School of Law Foundation Chair, the organization that hosts the annual Joseph L. Rauh Lectures.

== Awards ==
- In 1993 he was posthumously awarded the Presidential Medal of Freedom by Bill Clinton.
- In 1983 he received the Franklin D. Roosevelt Four Freedoms Awards for the freedom of speech.

== See also ==
- List of law clerks for the second seat of the Supreme Court of the United States
