= Americans for Democratic Action =

American political organization

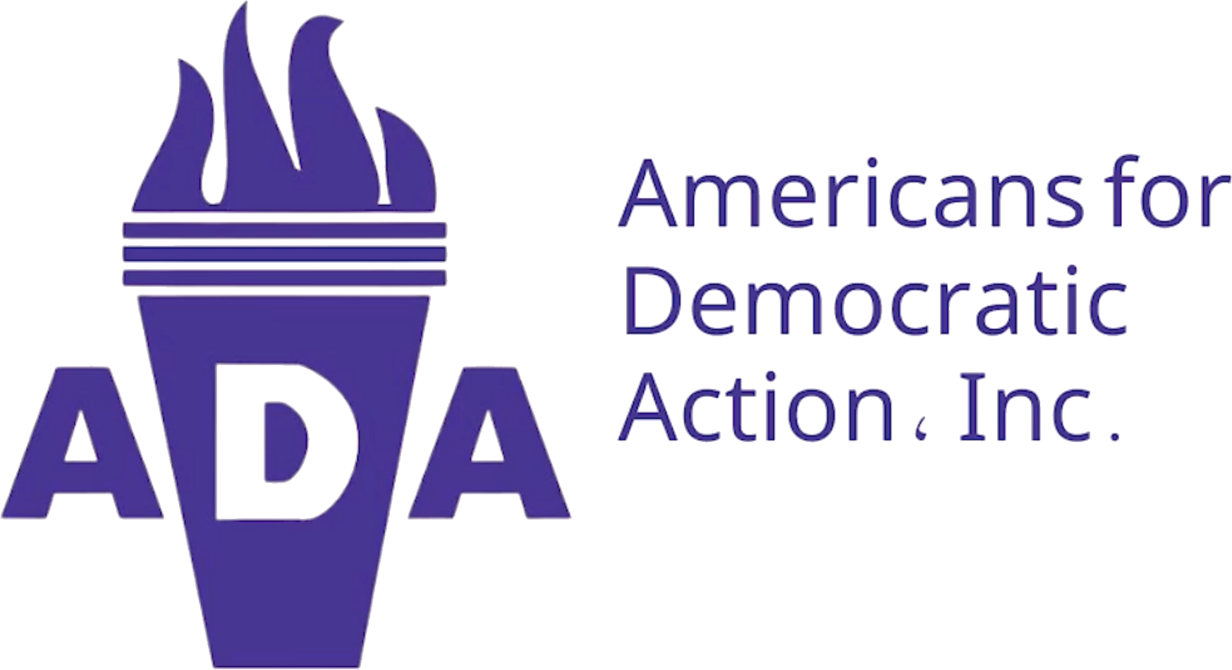
- Formation: January 3, 1947; 79 years ago
- Headquarters: Washington, D.C., United States
- Members: 65,000 members
- President: Art Haywood
- Website: adaction.org

Americans for Democratic Action, Inc. (ADA) is a liberal American political organization advocating progressive policies. ADA views itself as supporting social and economic justice through lobbying, grassroots organizing, research, and supporting progressive candidates.

== History ==
=== Formation ===
The ADA grew out of a predecessor group, the Union for Democratic Action (UDA). The UDA was formed by former members of the Socialist Party of America and the Committee to Defend America by Aiding the Allies as well as labor union leaders, liberal politicians, theologians, and others who were opposed to the pacifism adopted by most left-wing political organizations in the late 1930s and early 1940s. It supported an interventionist, internationalist foreign policy and a pro-union, liberal domestic policy. It was also strongly anti-communist. It undertook a major effort to support left-wing Democratic members of Congress in 1946, but this effort was an overwhelming failure.

James Isaac Loeb – later an ambassador and diplomat in the John F. Kennedy administration – the UDA's executive director, advocated disbanding the UDA and forming a new, more broadly based, mass-membership organization. The ADA was formed on January 3, 1947, and the UDA shuttered.

Among ADA's founding members were leading anti-communist liberals from academic, political, and labor circles, including theologian Reinhold Niebuhr, historian Arthur M. Schlesinger Jr., Eleanor Roosevelt, union leader Walter Reuther, civil rights lawyer Joseph Rauh, and Hubert Humphrey. Its founders hoped to solidify a progressive, pragmatic, noncommunist "vital center" in mainstream politics, embodying Schlesinger's concept formulated in his 1949 book The Vital Center.

=== Action ===
On April 3, 1948, ADA declared its decision to support a Democratic Party ticket of General Dwight D. Eisenhower and Supreme Court judge William O. Douglas over incumbent U.S. president Harry S. Truman. Truman lacked popular support, and the ADA succeeded in pushing Truman leftward on issues such as civil rights. It also led a full-scale attack on Progressive Party candidate and former US vice president Henry A. Wallace because of his opposition to the Marshall Plan and support for a more conciliatory relationship with the Soviet Union. The ADA portrayed Wallace and his supporters as dupes of the Communist Party. Adolf A. Berle Jr. and Franklin Delano Roosevelt Jr. believed that Eisenhower would accept the nomination. He did not.

ADA supported Truman after his victory in the 1948 election.

Although anti-communist, unlike other contemporary liberal groups like the Progressive Citizens of America (PCA), which supported cooperation with the Soviet Union, the ADA was still subject to significant McCarthyist scrutiny. The plight of the ADA during that period prompted Eleanor Roosevelt to accept a position as honorary chair of the organization in 1953, and in doing so, put Senator McCarthy in a position in which he would have had to "call her a communist as well" to continue his inquiries into the activities of the group. Because of her actions, many ADA leaders credited her with saving the organization.

In the early 1960s, ADA's influence peaked when a number of its key members (e.g. James Loeb, Arthur Schlesinger Jr.) were picked to join the administration of U.S. President John F. Kennedy. While active in liberal causes ranging from civil rights to Lyndon B. Johnson's Great Society reforms, by the mid-1960s the ADA's influence was on the wane. It was badly split over the Vietnam War: initially supporting Johnson's war policy, the ADA had come to oppose the war by early 1968. It endorsed founder Hubert Humphrey's presidential candidacy that year, but with "barely concealed ambivalence". After Richard Nixon's victory, the ADA was pushed to the political margins, overshadowed by more centrist groups like the Trilateral Commission and Coalition for a Democratic Majority.

== Leadership ==
=== Founders ===
Prominent founding members included:

- Joseph Alsop
- Stewart Alsop
- Chester Bowles
- Marquis Childs
- David Dubinsky
- Elmer Davis
- John Kenneth Galbraith
- Leon Henderson
- Hubert Humphrey
- James I. Loeb
- Reinhold Niebuhr
- Joseph P. Lash
- Joseph L. Rauh Jr.
- Walter Reuther
- Eleanor Roosevelt
- Franklin Delano Roosevelt Jr.
- Arthur Schlesinger Jr.
- John H. Sengstacke
- James Wechsler
- Walter White
- Wilson W. Wyatt

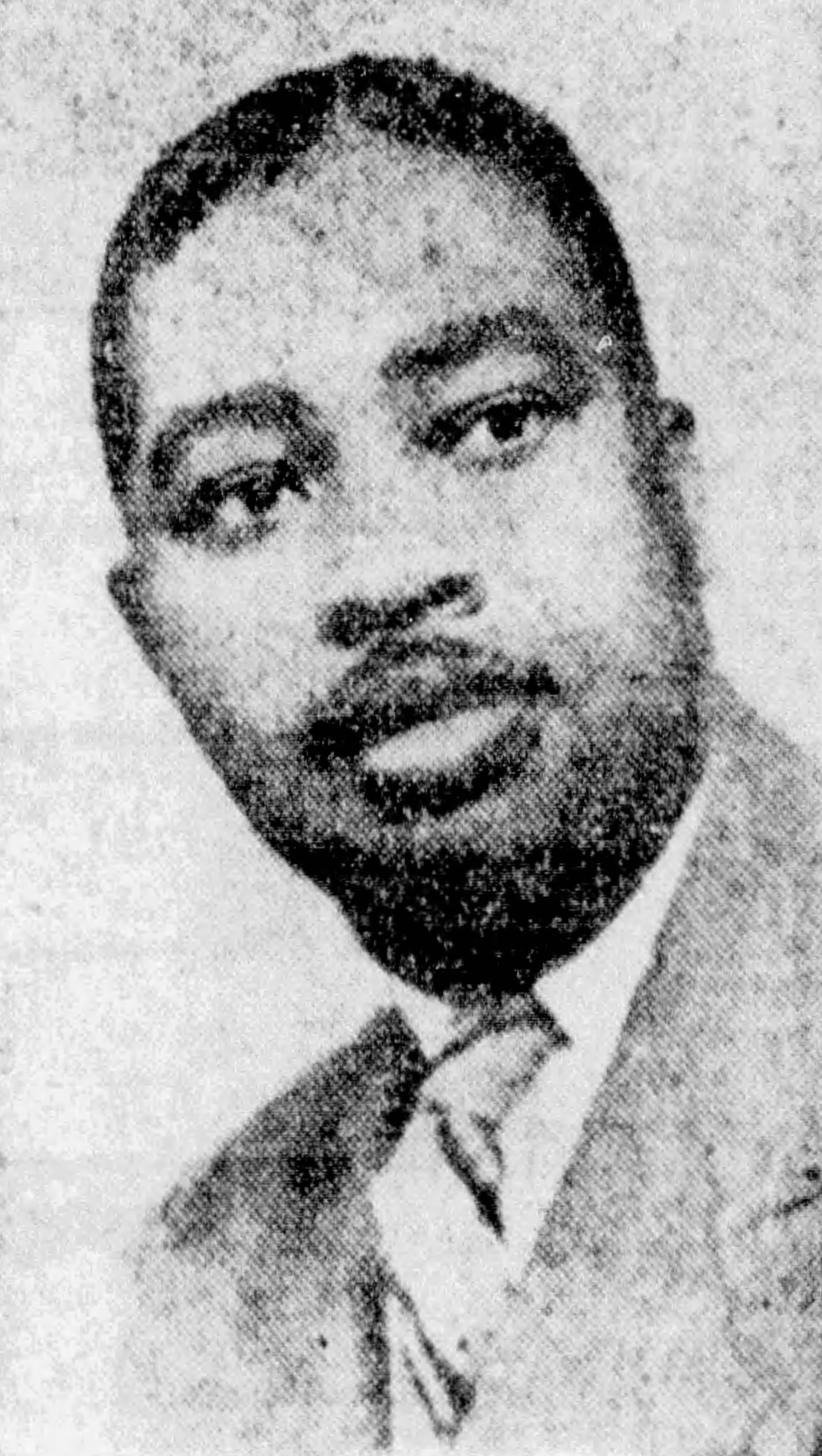
ADA Vice Chairman Benjamin F. McLaurin c. 1946

In April 1948 at New York state convention, ADA elected the following new officers: Jonathan Bingham of Scarborough as chairman with vice chairmen Dr. William Lehman of Syracuse, Benjamin McLaurin of New York City, Howard Linsay of New York City, Jack Rubenstein (Textile Workers Union, CIO), and Charles Zimmerman (International Ladies' Garment Workers Union).

=== Chairs and presidents ===
Since 1947, ADA's leaders have been:

- 1947–1948: Wilson Wyatt
- 1948–1949: Leon Henderson
- 1949–1950: Senator Hubert Humphrey
- 1950–1953: Francis Biddle
- 1954–1955: Arthur Schlesinger Jr. and James E. Doyle (co-chairs)
- 1955–1957: Joseph L. Rauh Jr.
- 1957–1959: Robert R. Nathan
- 1959–1962: Samuel H. Beer
- 1961–1964: Paul Seabury
- 1962–1965: John P. Roche
- 1965–1967: Rep. Don Edwards
- 1967–1969: John Kenneth Galbraith
- 1970–1971: Joseph Duffey
- 1971–1973: Rep. Allard K. Lowenstein
- 1974–1976: Rep. Donald M. Fraser
- 1976–1978: Senator George McGovern
- 1978–1981: Rep. Patsy T. Mink
- 1981–1984: The Rev. Robert F. Drinan, S.J.
- 1984–1986: Rep. Barney Frank
- 1986–1989: Rep. Ted Weiss
- 1989–1991: Rep. Charles B. Rangel
- 1991–1993: Senator Paul D. Wellstone
- 1993–1995: Rep. John Lewis
- 1995–1998: Jack Sheinkman
- 1998–2000: Rep. Jim Jontz
- 2000–2008: Rep. Jim McDermott
- 2008–2010: Richard Parker
- 2010–2016: Rep. Lynn Woolsey
- 2017–2018: State Senator Daylin Leach
- 2018–: State Senator Art Haywood

== Voting records ==
ADA ranks legislators, identifies key policy issues, and tracks how members of Congress vote on these issues. The annual ADA Voting Record gives each member a Liberal Quotient (LQ) rating from 0, meaning complete disagreement with ADA policies, to 100, meaning complete agreement with ADA policies. A score of 0 is considered conservative and a score 100 is considered liberal. The LQ is obtained by evaluating an elected official's votes on 20 key foreign and domestic social and economic issues chosen by the ADA's Legislative Committee. Each vote given a score of either 5 or 0 points, depending on whether the individual voted with or against the ADA's position, respectively. Absent voters are also given a score of 0 for the vote.

== See also ==
- Progressive Citizens of America
