= Robert R. Nathan =

American economist

Robert R. Nathan (December 25, 1908 – September 4, 2001) was an American economist heavily involved in US industrial mobilization during World War II, a liberal activist, and a pioneer in third-world economic development.

== Early life ==
Nathan grew up in Dayton, Ohio and attended the University of Pennsylvania, receiving a BA and MA. While in college, Nathan supported himself by factory work and selling silk stockings and telephone memo pads.

== Career ==
In 1933, Nathan joined US Commerce Department. During this time he worked with the influential economist Simon Kuznets, who he had also studied under at Wharton, in implementing the first national income measurements which would later serve as the basis for the GNP. When World War II started, Nathan frequently criticized the lack of industrial readiness should the United States enter the war.

In 1942, Nathan was elected as a Fellow of the American Statistical Association. That same year he was appointed chair of the federal War Production Board's planning committee. A chief insight was to plan for war production based on the U.S. population rather than on the basis of the existing industrial plant. Nathan also made the case to military officials that economic mobilization would not be able to support an invasion of Europe until 1944. Growing increasingly dissatisfied with the internal politics of the War Production Board, and feeling the need to serve his country, he volunteered for the Army in May 1943, though back injuries prevented him from serving in combat. During a long period of hospitalization for those injuries, Nathan wrote a book entitled Mobilizing for Abundance in which he argued for Keynesian policies to be extended after the war to preserve peacetime economic stability.

After the war. Nathan started the consulting firm Robert R. Nathan Associates (now Nathan Associates, Inc.) which conducted major economic development projects in the Middle East, Asia, and Latin America. During the 1950s, Nathan served for a period as chair of Americans for Democratic Action. In this role, he was openly critical of President Dwight Eisenhower's conservative policies. During subsequent decades, Nathan participated in Johnson administration efforts to further development in South Vietnam; supported Hubert Humphrey's presidential candidacy; and consulted in a number of high-profile projects, including the Curt Flood case.

== Death ==
Nathan died on September 4, 2001, in Bethesda, Maryland.
