= Louise W. Rauh =

American pediatrician

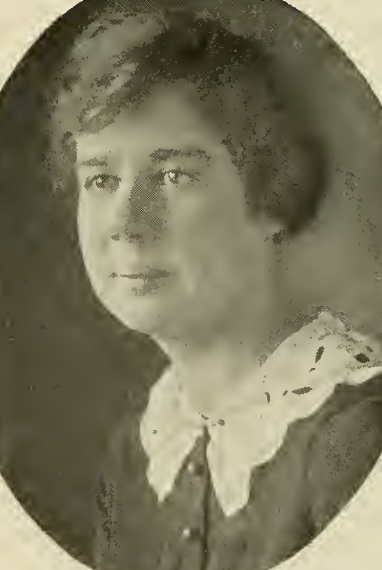
- Louise Rauh, from the 1924 yearbook of Wellesley College
- Born: Louise Weiler Rauh; June 4, 1902; Cincinnati, Ohio, U.S.
- Died: February 27, 1991 (age 88); Cincinnati, Ohio, U.S.
- Occupations: Pediatrician, medical researcher, medical educator
- Relatives: Joseph L. Rauh Jr. (brother)

Louise W. Rauh (June 4, 1902 – February 27, 1991) was an American pediatrician and an early specialist in pediatric cardiology. She was a professor of pediatrics at the University of Cincinnati College of Medicine.

== Early life and education ==
Rauh was born in the North Avondale neighborhood of Cincinnati, the daughter of Joseph L. Rauh and Sara Weiler Rauh. Her parents were Jewish; her father was a shirt manufacturer, and an immigrant from Germany. Her younger brother Joseph L. Rauh Jr. was a lawyer and civil rights activist. She graduated from Wellesley College in 1924. She earned her medical degree at the University of Cincinnati College of Medicine in 1928, as one of the school's first female students. She pursued further training in pediatrics in Vienna and at Mount Sinai Hospital in New York City.

== Career ==
Rauh served an internship at Cincinnati Children's Hospital. She worked with Robert A. Lyon at the Oyler Clinic. Lyon and Rauh opened "the nation's first pediatric cardiology unit" at Cincinnati Children's Hospital in the 1930s, and founded the Children's Heart Association to fund their work. She also She also opened rural cardiac clinics and had a private pediatric practice. She taught pediatrics at the University of Cincinnati College of Medicine, where was an active member of the Women's Faculty Association. Beginning in 1950, she was clinician for the Babies Milk Fund Association.

In 1971, Rauh was named one of Cincinnati's Women of the Year by The Cincinnati Enquirer. She retired in 1985; that year, a lectureship was named in her honor, and she gave an oral history interview to the Oral History of Medicine in Cincinnati project.

== Publications ==
- "Disturbance in Glycogen Metabolism with Hepatomegaly" (1934, with Carl Zelson)
- "A New Type of Movable Infant Isolation Unit" (1937, with J. Victor Greenebaum)
- "Simple Tachycardia in Children" (1939, with R. A. Lyon)
- "The incidence of organic heart disease in school children" (1939)
- "Extrasystoles in Children" (1939, with R. A. Lyon)
- "Heart murmurs in newborn infants" (1940, with R. A. Lyon and J. W. Stirling)
- "The Social Adjustment of Children with Heart Disease" (1941, with R. A. Lyon and Mary G. Carroll)
- "The prevention of rheumatic recurrences in children by the use of sulfathiazole and sulfadiazine" (1945, with Richard E. Wolf and R. A. Lyon)
- "Oral Penicillin Therapy in Children: Phenethicillin" (1962, with Carl Weihl, Frank W. Kellogg, and Lillis F. Altshuller)
- "Measles Immunization With Killed Virus Vaccine: Serum Antibody Titers and Experience With Exposure to Measles Epidemic" (1965, with Rosemary Schmidt)
- "Persistent Systemic Hypertension in the Adolescent" (1975, with Jennifer M. H. Loggie)

== Personal life ==
Rauh died in 1991, at the age of 88, in Cincinnati. A scholarship for medical students was established in her memory.
