= 1975 Sikkimese monarchy referendum =

Referendum that resulted in Sikkim becoming an Indian state

- 14 April 1975
- Abolishing the monarchy

Results
Choice	Votes	%
Yes	59,637	97.55%
No	1,496	2.45%
Total votes	61,133	100.00%
Registered voters/turnout		≈63%

A referendum on abolishing the monarchy was held in the Kingdom of Sikkim on 14 April 1975. Official results stated the proposal was approved by 97.55% of voters with a turnout of about 63%, and resulted in the country becoming an Indian state.

== Background ==
Sikkim had been a protectorate of India during the British colonial rule since the 19th century. The arrangement was continued after India's independence through a treaty in 1950, by which India assumed responsibility for communications, defence and foreign affairs, as well as the "territorial integrity" of Sikkim. Sikkim had autonomy in internal affairs.

Support for the Chogyal (the monarch) came from the Bhutia community (Tibetan settlers that came in during the medieval times) and to some extent the native Lepchas. During the colonial rule, the population of these two communities declined to less than 25% of the population of Sikkim. The remainder of the population was mostly made up of Nepali settlers, who came in during the British Raj. In the elections to the representative bodies, each vote of Bhutia-Lepcha communities was counted as representing six votes so as to give them an undue weight. The Indian government went along with this unequal system in the interest of stability in a strategic buffer state along the border.

== Government of Sikkim Act ==
In 1973, according to observers, India perceived increasing hostility from the Chogyal and decided to back the democratic movements which called for "one man one vote". Following violent agitations in April 1973, India mediated between the political movements and Chogyal, and brought in a new system, whereby an equal number of seats would be reserved for Bhutia-Lepchas and Nepalis (15 each), but the electorate would function on a "one man one vote" principle. (Note: Two additional seats were reserved for Scheduled Castes and the Buddhist sangha, respectively.) In the following elections, Sikkim National Congress, led by Kazi Lhendup Dorji, won 31 out of the 32 seats, defeating the royalist National Party in both the Nepali-dominated as well as Bhutia-Lepcha-dominated constituencies.

Between May and July 1974, the new government passed the Government of Sikkim Act, which was to be the new constitution for Sikkim. It was based on May 1973 agreement mediated by the Indian government, and created three institutions: Chief Minister, Council of Ministers and a Chief Executive. The office of the Chief Executive, reminiscent of the systems used during the British Raj, appeared to be the real head of state even though its holder was expected to seek the approval of the Chogyal for all important matters, while Chogyal himself was divested of all power. There were also several provisions for furthering relations with India. On 4 July 1974, it received the approval of the Chogyal.

On 13 August 1974, the Sikkim National Congress wrote to the Government of India citing the Chapter VI of the new constitution and sought participation of the people of Sikkim in the political institutions of India. Based on the request, the Government of India introduced the Constitutional (Thirty Sixth Amendment) Bill, 1974 giving Sikkim the status of an Associated State, and providing to Sikkim one seat each in the two houses of Indian Parliament. The Bill was passed by the Parliament by 7 September 1974.

=== Chogyal's opposition ===
The Chogyal Palden Thondup Namgyal immediately objected to India's Constitutional Amendment, calling it a violation of the 1950 Indo-Sikkim treaty. He asked the Indian prime minister Indira Gandhi to safeguard "our separate identity and international personality". According to Indian commentators, he also tried to "internationalise" the issue, by telling the foreign press that Sikkim was being "annexed" by India.

In February 1975, the Chogyal went to Nepal for the coronation of its king. He was said to have engaged in anti-India propaganda, attempting to mobilise the visiting foreign dignitaries to take up his cause. This inflamed the political movements in Sikkim, calling for the abolition of monarchy and the expulsion of the Chogyal from Sikkim. When the Chogyal returned to Sikkim, demonstrations blocked his way to the palace, and the palace guards attacked the demonstrators, injuring one member of the National Assembly. There were also reports of the Chogyal trying to raise a guerrilla force and importing arms from Chinese-administered Tibet. A supporter of Chogyal went to court and obtained an injunction against sending Sikkimese representatives to the Indian Parliament. There was violence on the streets with several people being shot in Gangtok.

The chief minister, Kazi Lhendup Dorji, requested Indian intervention. The Indian Army was sent in to disarm the palace guards, and the security of the palace was taken over by the Indian forces. The National Assembly passed a resolution calling for abolition of the monarchy and merger with the Indian Union. The chief ministered ordered a referendum on both the points to be held on 14 April 1975. A referendum had also been consistently demanded by the Chogyal and his supporters since the Indian incorporation of Sikkim as an associate state in September.

== Results ==
Choice	Votes	%
For	59,637	97.55
Against	1,496	2.45
Total	61,133	100.00
Source: Direct Democracy

The results of the plebiscite were questioned by Sunanda K. Datta-Ray, who argued that "it took at least two days by jeep, the fastest mode of transport, to reach some of these inaccessible habitations, and it just would not have been physically possible to complete arrangements, hold the polls and count votes between 11 and 15 April." Supporters of the Chogyal maintain that 70 to 80% of voters were outsiders from India.

== Reactions ==
China and Pakistan called the referendum a farce and a disguise for the forced annexation of the principality, to which Indira Gandhi replied by reminding them of their annexation of Tibet and the issue of Azad Kashmir, which India claims as Indian territory, respectively. The Chogyal called the referendum "illegal and unconstitutional".

The U.S. government viewed the merging of Sikkim into India as a historic and practical inevitability, given the state's location on important trade routes. The Soviet Union responded positively, though with a muted response. In 1978, Gandhi's successor, Prime Minister Morarji Desai, expressed regret and criticised the annexation of Sikkim, which along with increasing inflation led to violent protests against him by youth wing of the Indian National Congress. While Desai said the annexation was "not a desirable step" and bemoaned the fact he could not undo it, he also claimed "most of the people there wanted it" due to the unpopularity of the Chogyal.

== Aftermath ==
After the declaration of the results, Sikkim's chief minister Kazi Lhendup Dorji cabled the results of the referendum to Indira Gandhi and asked her "to make an immediate response and accept the decision" to which she responded by saying that the Indian government would introduce a constitutional amendment in Parliament that would allow the kingdom to become part of India constitutionally.

The Indian Parliament gave its final approval to the constitutional amendment making Sikkim a state on 26 April 1975. On 15 May 1975 Indian President Fakhruddin Ali Ahmed ratified a constitutional amendment that made Sikkim the 22nd state of India and abolished the position of the Chogyal.

Hope Cooke, the former Gyalmo (queen) of Sikkim, stated in her autobiography that she believed the 1978 death of the Chogyal's eldest son, Prince Tenzing, a popular figure and defiant Sikkimese nationalist, was orchestrated by India to weaken Sikkimese nationalism, noting that the prince was on a road built for one-way traffic when he was hit by a one-ton truck, and that there was no inquiry into the accident.

== See also ==
- Sikkim: Requiem for a Himalayan Kingdom

== Bibliography ==
- Bajpai, G. S. (1999), China's Shadow Over Sikkim: The Politics of Intimidation, Lancer Publishers, ISBN 978-1-897829-52-3
- Gupta, Ranjan (September 1975), "Sikkim: The Merger with India", Asian Survey, 15 (9): 786–798, doi:10.2307/2643174, JSTOR 2643174
- Rose, Leo E. (1978), "Modernizing a Traditional Administrative System: Sikkim 1890–1973", in James F. Fisher (ed.), Himalayan Anthropology: The Indo-Tibetan Interface, Walter de Gruyter, pp. 205–, ISBN 978-90-279-7700-7
- Sen, S. C. (1975), "Sikkim—Where Feudalism fights Democracy", Verfassung und Recht in Übersee / Law and Politics in Africa, Asia and Latin America, 8 (3/4): 345–364, JSTOR 43108474
- Saha, Biswanath (2022), "Citizenship Dilemmas of the Nepalis(ese) of Darjeeling Hills and Beyond", in Gorky Chakraborty (ed.), Citizenship in Contemporary Times: The Indian Context, Taylor & Francis, pp. 230–246, ISBN 9781000807721
