= Theodore C. Achilles =

American diplomat (1905–1986)

12th Counselor of the United States Department of State
- In office March 24, 1960 – February 15, 1961
- President: Dwight D. Eisenhower; John F. Kennedy
- Preceded by: G. Frederick Reinhardt
- Succeeded by: George C. McGhee

United States Ambassador to Peru
- In office July 24, 1956 – January 27, 1960
- President: Dwight D. Eisenhower
- Preceded by: Ellis O. Briggs
- Succeeded by: Selden Chapin

Director of the United States Department of State Operations Center
- In office 1961–1962
- President: John F. Kennedy

Personal details
- Born: Theodore Carter Achilles; December 29, 1905 Rochester, New York
- Died: April 8, 1986 (aged 80) Washington, D.C.
- Occupation: Diplomat

Theodore Carter Achilles (December 29, 1905 – April 8, 1986) was an American diplomat who served as Ambassador to Peru and the first director of the Department of State Operations Center.

== Biography ==
Achilles was born 29 December 1905 in Rochester, New York, to Gertrude Strong, the daughter of Eastman Kodak president Henry A. Strong, and Henry L. Achilles. Achilles's uncle, George R. Carter, was the second Governor of Hawaii, married to Helen Strong, another daughter of Henry A. Strong. Theodore Achilles graduated from Stanford University in 1925 with an AB and endeavored in postgraduate studies at Yale University until 1928. During his time at Yale, he was married in Los Angeles to Mrs. Louise Lord Coleman. In February 1933, Louise filed a divorce suit against her husband on grounds of cruelty. Achilles was married to Marian Field four months later, with whom he had four children.

After his studies at Yale, Achilles became involved in newspapers in California and Japan. In 1932, he began a career in government as the U.S. Vice Consul in Havana. The following year, he held the same position in Rome and was assigned the Department of State in 1935 to work with the general disarmament conference in Geneva. In 1939, he was assigned as third secretary at the American embassy in London. The following year, he served as U.S. representative to the governments in exile of Poland, Belgium, the Netherlands and Norway. In 1941, Achilles returned to the Department of State, and was appointed assistant chief at the division of British Commonwealth Affairs, before becoming chief. In 1945, he returned to London, where he was first secretary in the American embassy. He held the same position the following year in Brussels.

Achilles returned to Washington, D.C., in 1947 to head the Office of Western European Affairs, at the Department of State. He helped draft the North Atlantic Treaty in 1949, and would spend much of the later years of his life pushing for further integration of NATO. In 1950, he became U.S. vice deputy of the North Atlantic Council in London. Achilles served as Minister to Paris, from 1952 to 1960; and as Ambassador to Peru, from 1956 to 1960. He returned to Washington in 1960, when President Eisenhower made him counselor of the Department of State. In this capacity, he was in charge of a special task force preparing for the Bay of Pigs Invasion. From 1961 to 1962, he was special assistant to Secretary of State Rusk. Achilles worked with the State Department towards the establishment of the Operations Center and served as its first director in 1961. In the same year, President Kennedy appointed Achilles as his representative at a ceremony marking the independence of Algeria. He retired from the State Department in 1962.

During his earlier days at the State Department, Achilles was a victim of Vincenzo Bafaro, who faked his signature on forged government documents. Achilles was an important FBI informant, against members of the State Department, during the Second Red Scare.

After he retired from government, Achilles became a director and vice chairman of the Atlantic Council of the United States, a promoter of global governance. He also became a governor of the Atlantic Institute (1969–1973); a consultant for NASA (1963–1960); and vice chairman of the International Management and Development Institute. Achilles also sought further integration of the International Monetary Fund.

He was a member of a number of conferences throughout his life, notable ones that helped rebuild the world after World War II. He was a member of the U.S. delegation to the International Labor Organization Conference, 1941; the U.N. Conference on Food and Agriculture, 1943; the U.N. Conference on International Organization, 1945; the Council of Foreign Ministers, 1945; the first session of the U.N. Assembly, 1946, the second session of the U.N. Assembly, 1947; the Paris Conference, 1946; the North Atlantic Pact Negotiations, 1948–1949; NATO, 1950–1952, 1960; and CENTO, SEATO and Colombo Plan Conferences, 1960.

Achilles was co-editor of The Atlantic Community Quarterly, from 1963 to 1975.

As had many of his close relatives, he served on the board of the Eastman Kodak Co. from 1965.

Achilles was a member of the secretive Alibi Club, Beta Theta Pi, Brook Club of New York, Chevy Chase Club, Council on Foreign Relations, the Metropolitan Club of Washington and had attended the Bilderberg Group.

He died on 8 April 1986 of an embolism in Washington, D.C. He was laid to rest at the Saint John's Episcopal Church Cemetery.

Diplomatic posts
Preceded by Ellis O. Briggs	United States Ambassador to Peru; 24 July 1956–27 January 1960	Succeeded by Selden Chapin
