= Union for Democratic Action =

American political organization

The Union for Democratic Action (UDA) was an American political organization advocating liberal policies and the preservation and extension of democratic values domestically and overseas. It existed from 1941 to 1947, and was the precursor organization to the group Americans for Democratic Action.

== History ==
The Union for Democratic Action was co-founded by liberal theologian Reinhold Niebuhr (then a member of the Socialist Party of America), James I. Loeb (later an ambassador and diplomat in the John F. Kennedy administration), International Ladies Garment Workers Union official Murray Gross, actor Melvyn Douglas, and others at the Town Hall Club in New York City on May 10, 1941. The impetus for the formation of the UDA was the pacifism advocated by the Socialist Party of America, which many socialist intellectuals and left-wing activists felt was inappropriate given the threat to western democratic nations posed by Adolf Hitler and Nazi Germany. Other leaders and members of the UDA came out of William Allen White's Committee to Defend America by Aiding the Allies, which was becoming increasingly conservative. The organization was explicitly pro-union, and barred political conservatives from membership. The organization also explicitly barred communists from membership as well.

Niebuhr was the organization's first and only chairperson. Loeb was its executive director.

The organization was widely quoted; its members often held influential positions in the presidential administration of Franklin D. Roosevelt, and it strongly supported the Lend-Lease arms supply program. In 1945, the UDA distributed 1 million copies of a cartoon pamphlet in support of the Dumbarton Oaks proposals for an international organization that would become the United Nations.

But it was financially very weak and had only a handful of low-membership chapters on the East Coast. It had only one active chapter in 1944 and a mere 5,000 members in 1946. The organization was politically astute, however. It pioneered the use of the voting records of members of Congress as a means of swaying public opinion for or against its favored candidates.

The UDA undertook a major effort to support left-wing Democratic candidates for Congress in 1946. The defeat of a large number of Democrats in the 1946 elections prompted Loeb to advocate UDA's disbanding and the formation of a new, more broadly based, mass-membership organization. The Americans for Democratic Action was formed on January 4, 1947, and the UDA shuttered.

== Bibliography ==
- Beinart, Peter. The Good Fight: Why Liberals—and Only Liberals—Can Win the War on Terror and Make America Great Again. Carlton, Victoria, Australia: Melbourne University Press, 2007.
- Boyle, Kevin. The UAW and the Heyday of American Liberalism, 1945-1968. Ithaca, N.Y.: Cornell University Press, 1998.
- Brock, Clifton. Americans for Democratic Action: Its Role in National Politics. Westport, Conn.: Greenwood Press, 1962.
- Brown, Charles C. Niebuhr and His Age: Reinhold Niebuhr's Prophetic Role and Legacy. Harrisburg, Pa.: Trinity Press International, 2002.
- Ceplair, Larry. "The Film Industry's Battle Against Left-Wing Influences, From the Russian Revolution to the Blacklist." Film History. 2008: 399-411.
- Davis, Jack E. The Civil Rights Movement. Malden, Mass.: Blackwell, 2000.
- Halpern, Martin. UAW Politics in the Cold War Era. Albany, N.Y.: State University of New York Press, 1988.
- Hambly, Alonzo L. "The Liberals, Truman, and the FDR as Symbol and Myth." The Journal of American History. 56:4 (March 1970).
- Heale, M.J. American Anticommunism: Combating the Enemy Within, 1830-1970. Baltimore, Md.: Johns Hopkins University Press, 1990.
- Libros, Hal. Hard Core Liberals: A Sociological Analysis of the Philadelphia Americans for Democratic Action. Cambridge, Mass.: Schenkman Publishing Co., 1975.
- Parmet, Robert D. The Master of Seventh Avenue: David Dubinsky and the American Labor Movement. New York: New York University Press, 2005.
- Powers, Richard Gid. Not Without Honor: The History of American Anticommunism. New Haven, Con..: Yale University Press, 1998.
- Zuckerman, Nathan. The Wine of Violence: An Anthology on Anti-Semitism. New York, Association Press, 1947.
