= James I. Loeb =

American diplomat (1909–1992)

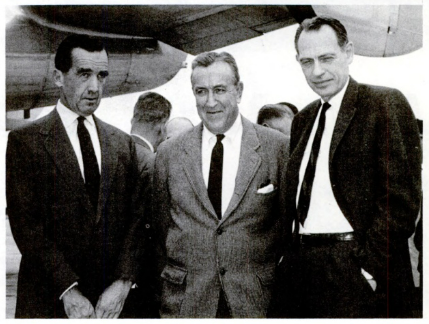
- Ambassador to Peru James I. Loeb, Jr (right) meets Mr. Bowels at the Lima-Callao Airport with Edward R. Murrow, Director of the USIA

US Ambassador to Peru
- In office May 23, 1961 – July 26, 1962
- President: John F. Kennedy
- Preceded by: Selden Chapin
- Succeeded by: J. Wesley Jones

US Ambassador to Guinea
- In office September 21, 1963 – September 21, 1965
- President: John F. Kennedy
- Preceded by: William Attwood
- Succeeded by: Robinson McIlvaine

James I. Loeb (August 18, 1909 – January 10, 1992) was an American politician and U.S. ambassador to Peru, who served as the first national executive secretary of Americans for Democratic Action.

== Background ==
James Isaac Loeb, Jr., was born on August 18, 1909, in Highland Park, Illinois.

In 1929, he obtained an AB from Dartmouth College. In 1931, he obtained an AM from Northwestern University and in 1936 a doctorate.

== Career ==
Loeb began his career as a teacher of the French and Spanish languages at the Townsend Harris High School.

He provided support from American organizations in the latter years of the Spanish Civil War. He also joined the International Labor Solidarity Committee of the Socialist Party of America and was anti-communist. During this time, he traveled to Europe to help Spanish refugees. He interacted with the Abraham Lincoln Brigade, American Civil Liberties Union, and Medical Bureau and North American Committee to Aid Spanish Democracy.

In 1941, with Reinhold Niebuhr he co-founded the Union for Democratic Action (UDA), which he served as executive director.

In 1947, he helped merge the UDA into Americans for Democratic Action, which he also served as executive secretary until 1953.

In 1948, ADA tried to recruit (then) General Dwight D. Eisenhower to run for president as a Democrat, which came about "in a very peculiar way." Sidney Hillman had Philip Murray, president of the Congress of Industrial Organizations (CIO) speak at a CIO convention in Atlantic City, New Jersey. Eisenhower made a pro-labor speech. Murray loved Eisenhower's speech. He had Jack Kroll of the CIO Political Action Committee (CIO-PAC) ask ADA to serve as indirect conduit and recruit Eisenhower through his younger brother, Milton S. Eisenhower.

In 1948, as Loeb later recalled, Eleanor Roosevelt sent the ADA "to do battle" with the Progressive Party. Loeb went to their convention in late July 1948, where Lee Pressman ("probably was the most important Communist in the country") prevented him from speaking:

(Loeb:) "Could you tell me when I'm going to appear?"
(Tugwell:) "You better ask the secretary of the committee (Lee Pressman)."
(Pressman:) "I don't know."

Loeb left the convention, stonewalled.

In the 1948 presidential election, Loeb believed that a combination of Truman's strong civil rights platform plus his de facto center, thanks to walk-outs on the Democratic Party by Strom Thurmond's Dixiecrats and Henry A. Wallace's Progressives gave the American people an easy choice.

In 1951, he began consulting to President Harry S. Truman's special counsel, Charles S. Murphy. In 1952, he became executive assistant to Governor W. Averell Harriman.

In 1953, he became part-owner and co-publisher with Roger Tubby of The Adirondac Daily Enterprise of Saranac Lake, New York, which he continued through to 1970.

In April 1961, U.S. President John F. Kennedy appointed him U.S. Ambassador to Peru. In July 1962, Kennedy recalled him to show disapproval of a military coup.

In 1963, Kennedy appointed him U.S. Ambassador to Guinea in West Africa.

In the late 1970s, he was a fundraiser for the NAACP's Legal Defense and Education Fund.

== Personal and death ==
Loeb married Ellen Katz; they divorced. He married Anna Frank Loeb. He had a son and a daughter.

He died age 83 of pneumonia on January 10, 1992, the Alice Peck Day Extended Care Facility in Lebanon, New Hampshire, after suffering from Alzheimer's disease.

== Awards ==
- 1983: Distinguished Service Award from North Country Community College

== Legacy ==
Loeb left his papers to Dartmouth College.
