= Executive Secretariat =

Organ of the United States Department of State

United States Department of State Executive Secretariat
Agency overview
- Jurisdiction: Executive branch of the United States
- Agency executive: Lisa D. Kenna, Executive Secretary
- Parent department: U.S. Department of State
- Website: the Executive Secretariat

The United States Department of State Executive Secretariat (S/ES) is composed of the executive secretary of the State Department and five deputy executive secretaries. It is responsible for coordination of the work of the Department of State internally, serving as the liaison between the department's bureaus and the offices of the secretary, deputy secretaries, and under secretaries. It also handles the department's relations with the White House, National Security Council, and other executive departments.

The secretariat staff (S/ES-S) works with the various offices of the department in drafting and clearing written materials for the secretary, deputy secretaries, and under secretary for political affairs. This staff also is responsible for taking care of advance preparations for the secretary's official trips—domestic and international—and staffing the "mobile office" and keeping the secretary's schedule on track during the trip.

The State Department Operations Center (S/ES-O) is the secretary's and the department's communications and crisis management center. Working 24 hours a day, 365 days a year, the operations center monitors world events, prepares briefings for the secretary and other department principals, and facilitates communication between the department and the rest of the world. The operations center also coordinates the department's response to crises and supports task forces, monitoring groups, and other crisis-related activities, and serves as the link for all information flowing between Washington and the secretary of state during his or her travel, both domestically and abroad.

== History ==
The State Department established the Executive Secretariat in March 1947 to regulate the flow of information within the highest levels of the Department. Its functions have included the preparation of briefing papers about the Department during the transitions between presidential administrations and (since 1962) the management of the State Department Operations Center.
