= H. F. Arthur Schoenfeld =

American diplomat

Hans Frederick Arthur Schoenfeld (January 31, 1889 Providence, Rhode Island–1952) was an American Career Foreign Service Officer. On three occasions, he was commissioned to be an Envoy Extraordinary and Minister Plenipotentiary but did not serve (Bulgaria, 1928 and 1929; Costa Rica 1929) but he did serve as Envoy Extraordinary and Minister Plenipotentiary to the Dominican Republic (1931–1937), Finland (1937–1942) and Hungary (1946–1947). He was also Chargé d'Affaires in Mexico City.

== Biography ==
Schoenfeld is a graduate of the George Washington University where he received both a bachelor's degree and a master's degree. He taught history there for several years.
