= Hope Cooke =

Queen of Sikkim from 1963 to 1975

- Gyalmo of Sikkim
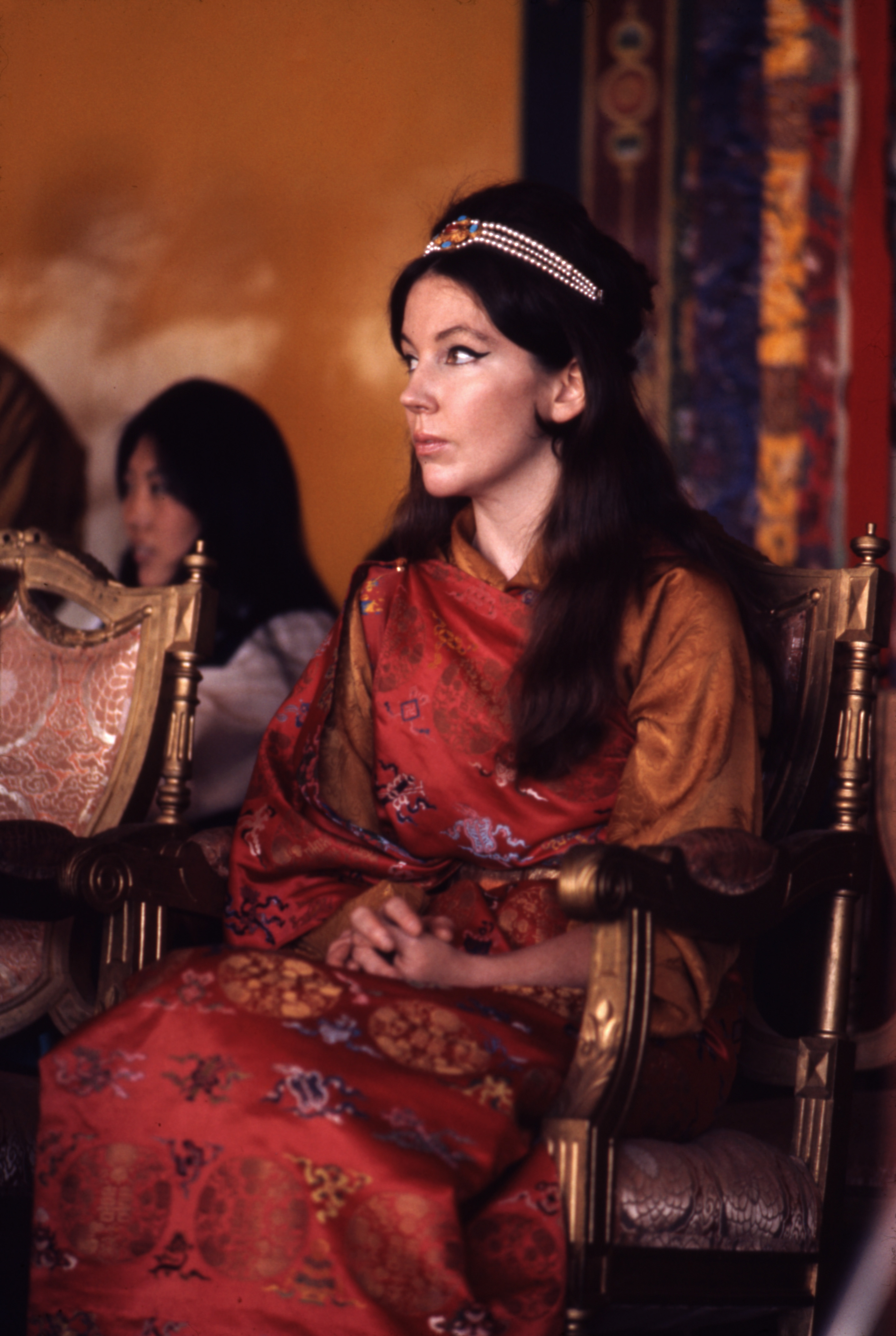
- Hope Namgyal, Queen of Sikkim in 1971, photograph by Alice Kandell

Queen consort of Sikkim
- Tenure: 1963–1975
- Predecessor: Samyo Kushoe Sangideki
- Successor: Monarchy abolished
- Born: June 24, 1940 (age 86); San Francisco, California, US
- Spouse: King Palden Thondup Namgyal (1963–1980; divorced); Mike Wallace (divorced)
- Issue: Prince Palden Gyurmed Namgyal; Princess Hope Leezum Namgyal Tobden (Mrs. Yep Wangyal Tobden)
Regnal name
- Hope La
- Dynasty: Namgyal
- Father: John J. Cooke
- Mother: Hope Noyes
- Religion: Episcopalian
- Occupation: Author, lecturer
- Education: Sarah Lawrence College

Hope Cooke (born June 24, 1940) is the former Gyalmo (Tibetan: རྒྱལ་མོ་, Wylie: rgyal mo; Queen consort) of the 12th and last Chogyal (King) of Sikkim, Palden Thondup Namgyal. Their wedding took place in March 1963. She was termed Her Highness The Crown Princess of Sikkim and became the Gyalmo of Sikkim at Palden Thondup Namgyal's coronation in 1965. She is the first American-born Queen Consort.

In 1975 Namgyal was deposed and Sikkim merged into India as a result of internal turmoil, Indian intervention and a referendum. She had left her husband and the palace in the Himalayan kingdom in July, 1973, and returned to New York. Cooke and her husband divorced in 1980. Namgyal died of cancer in New York City in 1982.

Cooke wrote an autobiography, Time Change (Simon & Schuster 1981) and began a career as a lecturer, book critic, and magazine contributor, later becoming an urban historian. In her new life as a student of New York City, Cooke published Seeing New York (Temple University Press 1995); worked as a newspaper columnist (Daily News); and taught at Yale University, Sarah Lawrence College, and Birch Wathen, a New York City private school.

== Early life and family ==
Cooke was born in San Francisco to John J. Cooke, a flight instructor, and Hope Noyes, an amateur pilot. She was raised in the Episcopal Church. Her mother, Hope Noyes, died in January 1942 at age 25 when the plane she was flying solo crashed.

After her mother's death, Cooke and her half-sister, Harriet Townsend, moved to a New York City apartment across the hall from their maternal grandparents, Helen (Humpstone) and Winchester Noyes, the president of J. H. Winchester & Company, an international shipping brokerage firm. They were raised by a succession of governesses. Her grandfather died when she was 12 and her grandmother died three years later. Cooke became the ward of her aunt and uncle, Mary Paul (Noyes) and Selden Chapin, a former US Ambassador to Iran and Peru. She studied at the Chapin School in New York and attended the Madeira School for three years before finishing high school in Iran.

== Marriage to the Crown Prince of Sikkim ==
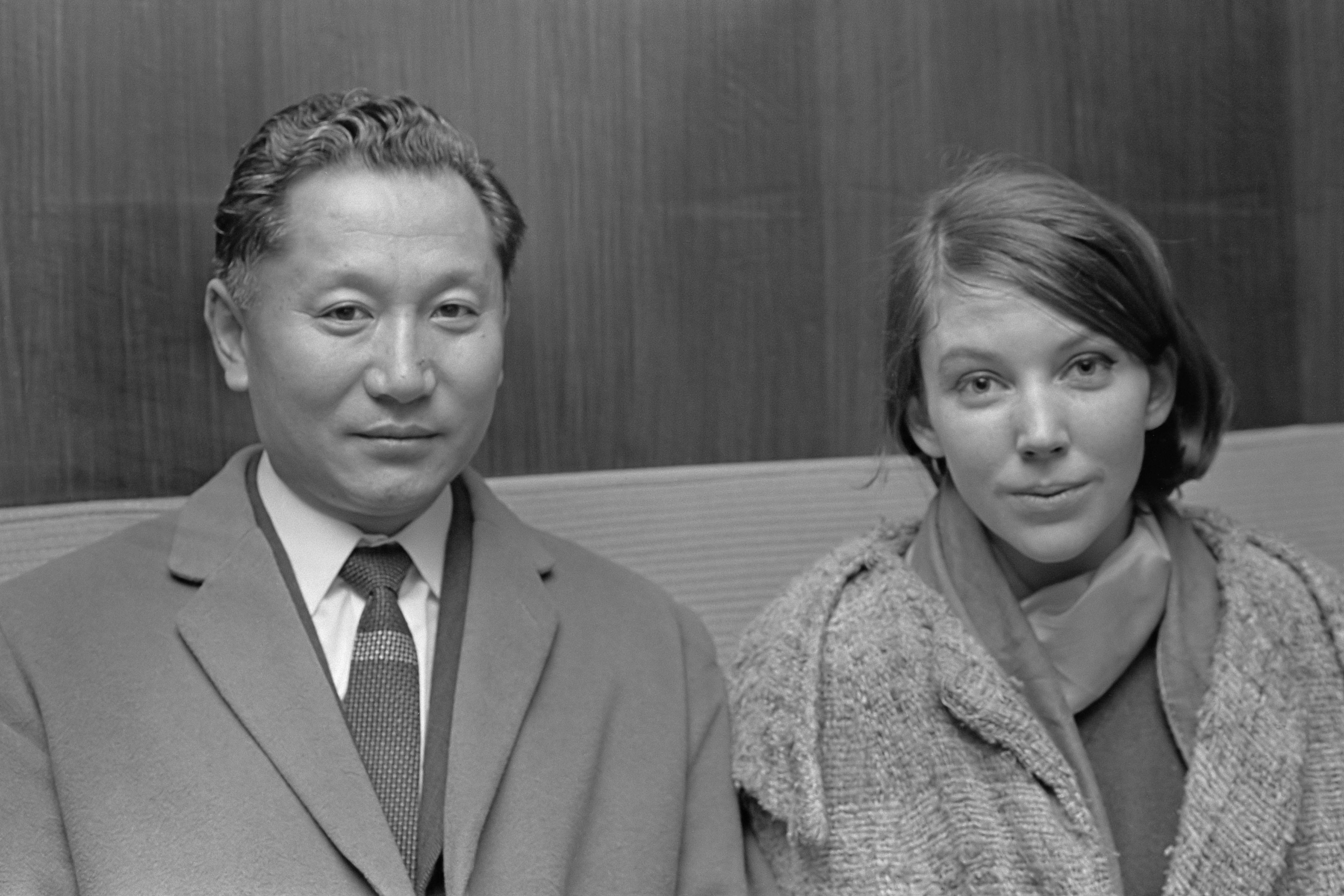
King and Queen of Sikkim, 1966

In 1959, Cooke was a freshman majoring in Asian Studies at Sarah Lawrence College and sharing an apartment with actress Jane Alexander. She went on a summer trip to India and met Palden Thondup Namgyal, Crown Prince of Sikkim, in the lounge of the Windamere Hotel in Darjeeling, India. He was a 36 year-old recent widower with two sons and a daughter. They were drawn to each other by the similar isolation of their childhoods. Two years later, in 1961, their engagement was announced, but the wedding was put off for more than a year because astrologers in both Sikkim and India warned that 1962 was an inauspicious year for marriages.

On March 20, 1963, Cooke married Namgyal in a Buddhist monastery in a ceremony performed by fourteen lamas. Wedding guests included members of Indian royalty, Indian and Sikkimese generals, and the US Ambassador to India, John Kenneth Galbraith. Cooke renounced her United States citizenship as required by Sikkim's laws and also as a demonstration to the people of Sikkim that she was not an "American arm" in the Himalayas. She was dropped from the Social Register but the marriage was reported in National Geographic magazine. The New Yorker followed the royal couple on one of their yearly trips to the United States. Although her husband was Buddhist, Cooke did not officially convert from Christianity to Buddhism though she had practiced Buddhism from an early age (Henry Kissinger once remarked "she has become more Buddhist than the population"). Namgyal was crowned monarch of Sikkim on April 4, 1965. However, their marriage faced strains, and both had affairs: he with a married Belgian woman, and she with an American friend.

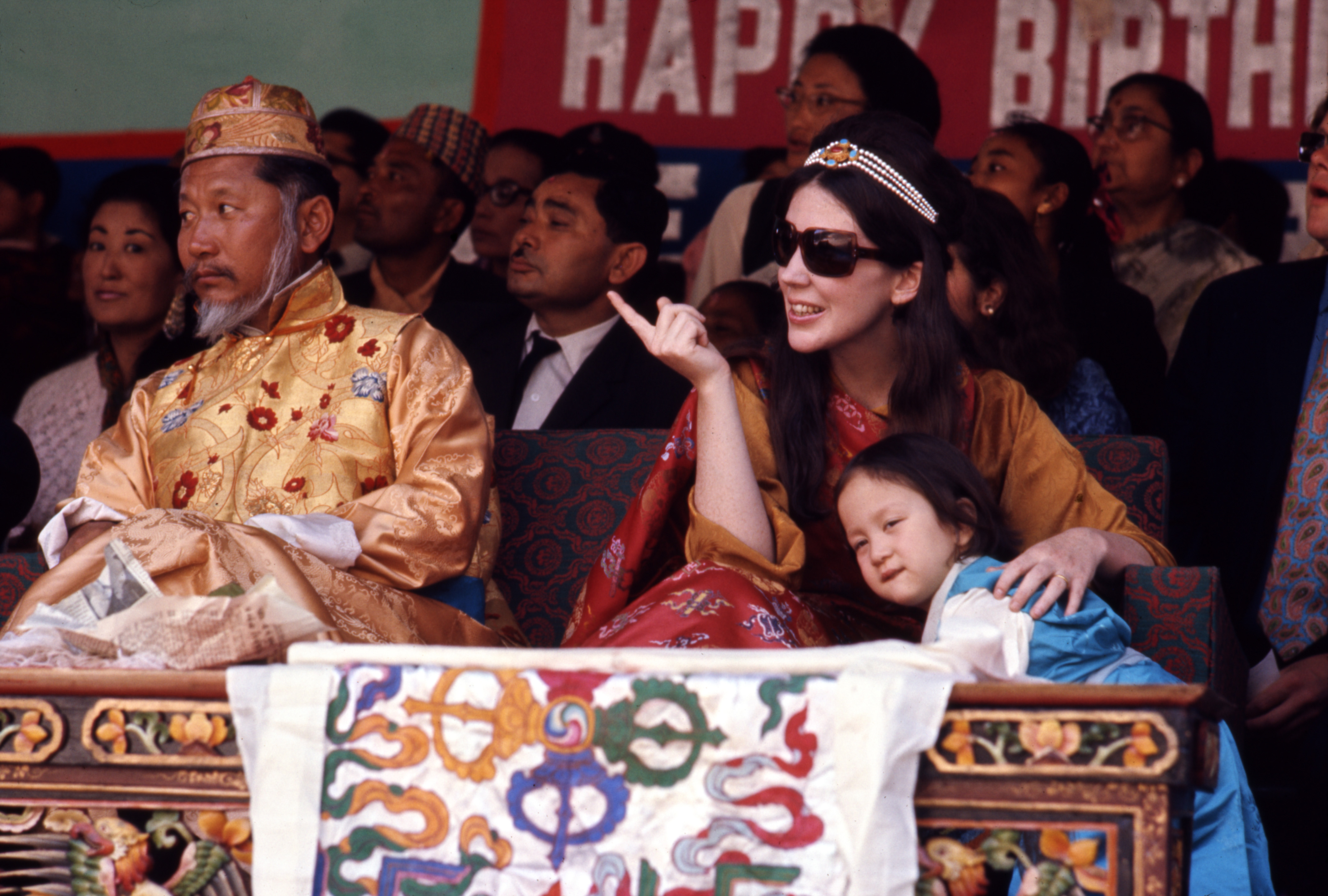
King and Queen of Sikkim and their daughter watch birthday celebrations in Gangtok, Sikkim, May 1971

At the same time, Sikkim was under strain due to pro-democracy crowds marching on the palace against the monarchy. Amidst this, Cooke had left for New York in July 1973, leaving her husband and the palace. On Thursday, April 10, 1975 the legislature in Sikkim voted to abolish the monarchy and seek full statehood in India. The King, Palden Thondup Namgyal, was cloistered in his palace under protection. The couple separated in 1980.

In May 1975, Representative James W. Symington (D-MO) and Senator Mike Mansfield (D-MT) sponsored private bills to restore her citizenship; however, after the bill passed the Senate, several members of the House Judiciary Subcommittee on Immigration objected out of offense that she had renounced her American citizenship in the first place, and the bill had to be amended to grant her only U.S. permanent resident status before it could gain their support and pass Congress. President Gerald Ford signed the bill into law on June 16, 1976. By 1981, she still had not been able to regain U.S. citizenship. The royal couple divorced in 1980, and Namgyal died of cancer in 1982 in New York City.

== Later life ==
With child support from Namgyal and an inheritance from her grandparents, Cooke rented an apartment in the Yorkville area of New York City. This time around, she felt "profoundly displaced" in the city and started going on walking tours and then creating her own. She studied Dutch journals, old church sermons, and newspaper articles to acquaint herself with the city and lectured on the social history of New York. She wrote a weekly column, "Undiscovered Manhattan", for the Daily News. Her books include an award-winning memoir of her life in Sikkim, Time Change: An Autobiography (1981), an off-the-beaten-path guide to New York, Seeing New York, developed from her walking tours, and, with Jacques d'Amboise, she published Teaching the Magic of Dance.

Cooke remarried in 1983 to Mike Wallace, a Pulitzer Prize–winning historian and Distinguished Professor of History at John Jay College of Criminal Justice. They later divorced. Her son, Prince Palden, a New York banker and financial advisor, married Kesang Deki Tashi and has a son and three daughters. Cooke's daughter, Princess Hope, graduated from Milton Academy and Georgetown University, and married (and later divorced) Thomas Gwyn Reich, Jr., a US Foreign Service officer; she later remarried, to Yep Wangyal Tobden.

Cooke lived in London for a few years before returning to the United States, where she now lives in Brooklyn and currently works as a writer, historian, and lecturer. She was a consultant for PBS's New York: A Documentary Film (1999–2001). Cooke has contributed to book reviews and magazines and lectured widely.

== Political involvement and controversies ==
Cooke, along with other advisors, was involved in policy formation for the Chogyal. One of this was to dig up the controversy around the grant of Darjeeling to the East India Company (EIC). She twisted it in turn to advocate for its return from India in an article published in 1967. The article put the trust between the Chogyal and Indian government in severe strain. Cooke was labelled as a "Trojan Horse" planted by Central Intelligence Agency to undermine the Indian government's efforts. There was local resentment against her, and the Sikkimese bureaucrats accused her of meddling in administrative decisions. She had diverted the Indian government aid funds for Bhutia interests, thereby alienating the Nepalese majority and fostering ethnic divide.

She faced allegations of being an agent of the CIA during her tenure as queen, purportedly promoting American interests and opposing the merger of Sikkim, then an Indian protectorate. Her American background also fueled suspicions of CIA influence in Sikkim's affairs.

Her deliberate and repetitive interventions were seen as creating internal unrest and added fuel to the growing pro-democracy movements, which culminated in riots in April 1973. Amidst this, Cooke along with her children had left Sikkim and returned to New York in 1973, leaving behind her husband. In 1975, under the pro-democracy movement over 97% Sikkimese voted in a referendum to abolish monarchy, and integrate Sikkim with India.

== Publications ==
- Time Change: An American Woman's Extraordinary Story, New York: Simon & Schuster (1981); ISBN 0-671-41225-6.
- Teaching the Magic of Dance (with Jacques d'Amboise), New York: Simon & Schuster (1983); ISBN 0-671-46077-3.
- Seeing New York: History Walks for Armchair and Footloose Travelers, Philadelphia: Temple University Press (1995); ISBN 1-56639-289-6.
- Cooke wrote several articles for the Bulletin of Tibetology, published by the Namgyal Institute of Tibetology.

== Bibliography ==
- "Crowning of Hope Cook, Sarah Lawrence '63'" in Life, April 23, 1965. p. 37.
- "How Is Queen Hope Getting Along?" Life, May 20, 1966, p. 51.
- "Hope Cooke: From American Coed to Oriental Queen". Family Weekly (August 2, 1964). Sarasota Herald-Tribune.
