= Palden Thondup Namgyal =

Chogyal of Sikkim from 1963 to 1975

- The 12th Chogyal
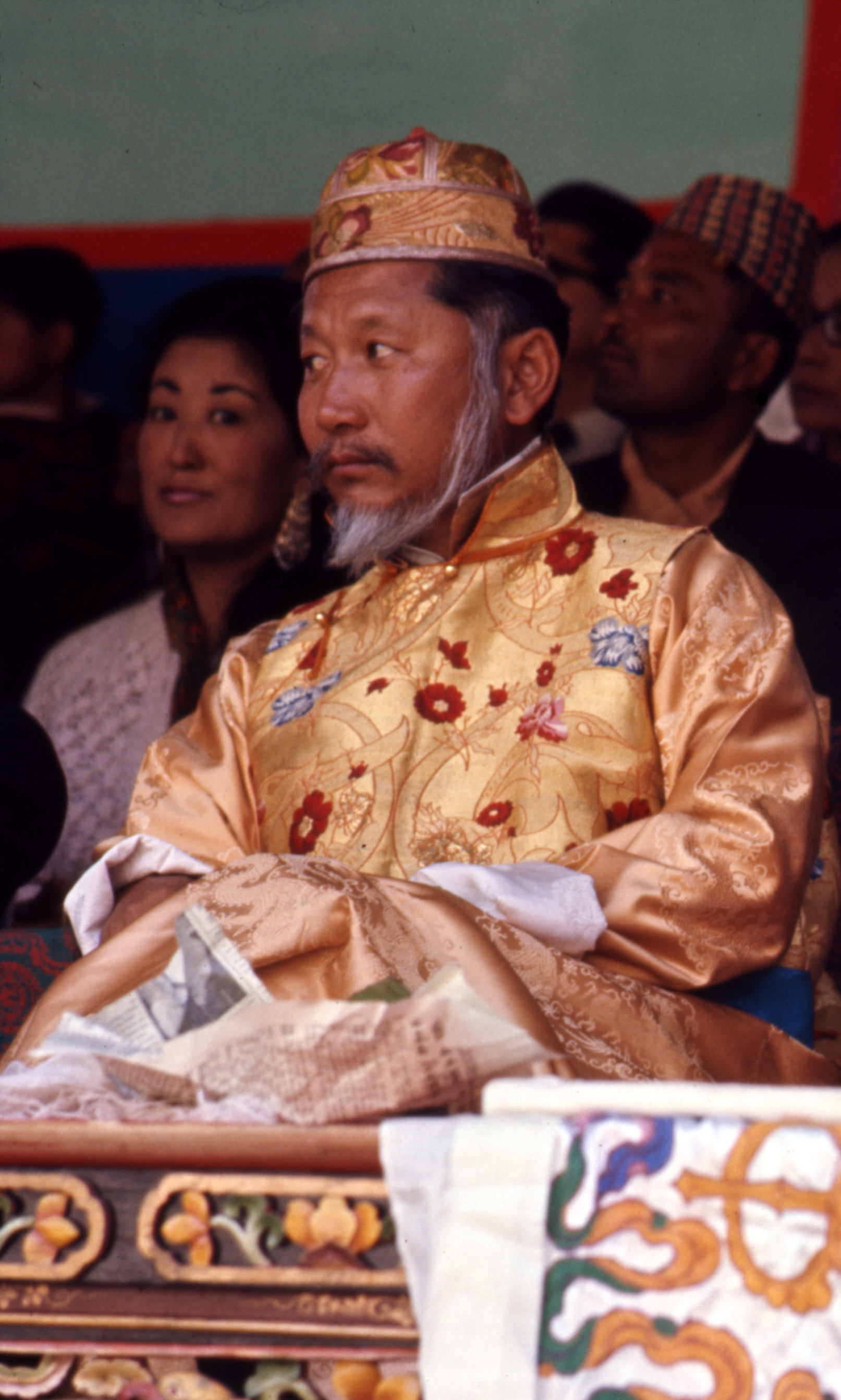
- Palden Thondup Namgyal in 1971

Chogyal of Sikkim
- Reign: 2 December 1963 – 10 April 1975
- Coronation: 4 April 1965
- Predecessor: Tashi Namgyal
- Successor: Monarchy abolished
- Born: 23 May 1923; Gangtok, Kingdom of Sikkim
- Died: 29 January 1982 (aged 58); New York City, U.S.
- Spouse: Samyo Kushoe Sangideki (1950–1957); Hope Cooke (1963–1980)
- Issue: Prince Tenzing Kunzang Jigme Namgyal; Prince Tobgyal Wangchuk Tenzing Namgyal; Princess Yangchen Dolma Namgyal; Prince Palden Gyurmed Namgyal; Princess Hope Leezum Namgyal Tobden
- House: Namgyal
- Father: Tashi Namgyal
- Mother: Kunzang Dechen
- Religion: Buddhism
- Military career
- Allegiance: Kingdom of Sikkim
- Service years: 1963–1975

Palden Thondup Namgyal OBE (Sikkimese: དཔལ་ལྡན་དོན་དྲུཔ་རྣམ་རྒྱལ; Wylie: dpal-ldan don-grub rnam-rgyal) (23 May 1923 – 29 January 1982) was the 12th and last Chogyal (king) of the Kingdom of Sikkim.

== Biography ==
Palden Thondup Namgyal was born on 23 May 1923 at the Royal Palace, Park Ridge, Gangtok.

At six, he became a student at St. Joseph's Convent in Kalimpong, but had to terminate his studies due to attacks of malaria. From age eight to eleven he studied under his uncle, Rimpoche Lhatsun, in order to be ordained a Buddhist monk; he was subsequently recognised as the reincarnated leader of both Phodong and Rumtek monasteries. He later continued his studies at St. Joseph's College in Darjeeling and finally graduated from Bishop Cotton School in Shimla, in 1941. His plans to study science at Cambridge were dashed when his elder brother, the crown prince, a member of the Indian Air Force was killed in a plane crash in 1941. He underwent training for Indian Civil Service at Dehradun I.C.S. Camp.

Namgyal served as adviser for internal affairs for his father, Sir Tashi Namgyal, the 11th Chogyal, and led the negotiating team which established Sikkim's relationship to India after independence in 1949. He married Samyo Kushoe Sangideki in 1950, a daughter of an important Tibetan family of Lhasa, and together they had two sons and a daughter. Samyo Kushoe Sangideki died in 1957.

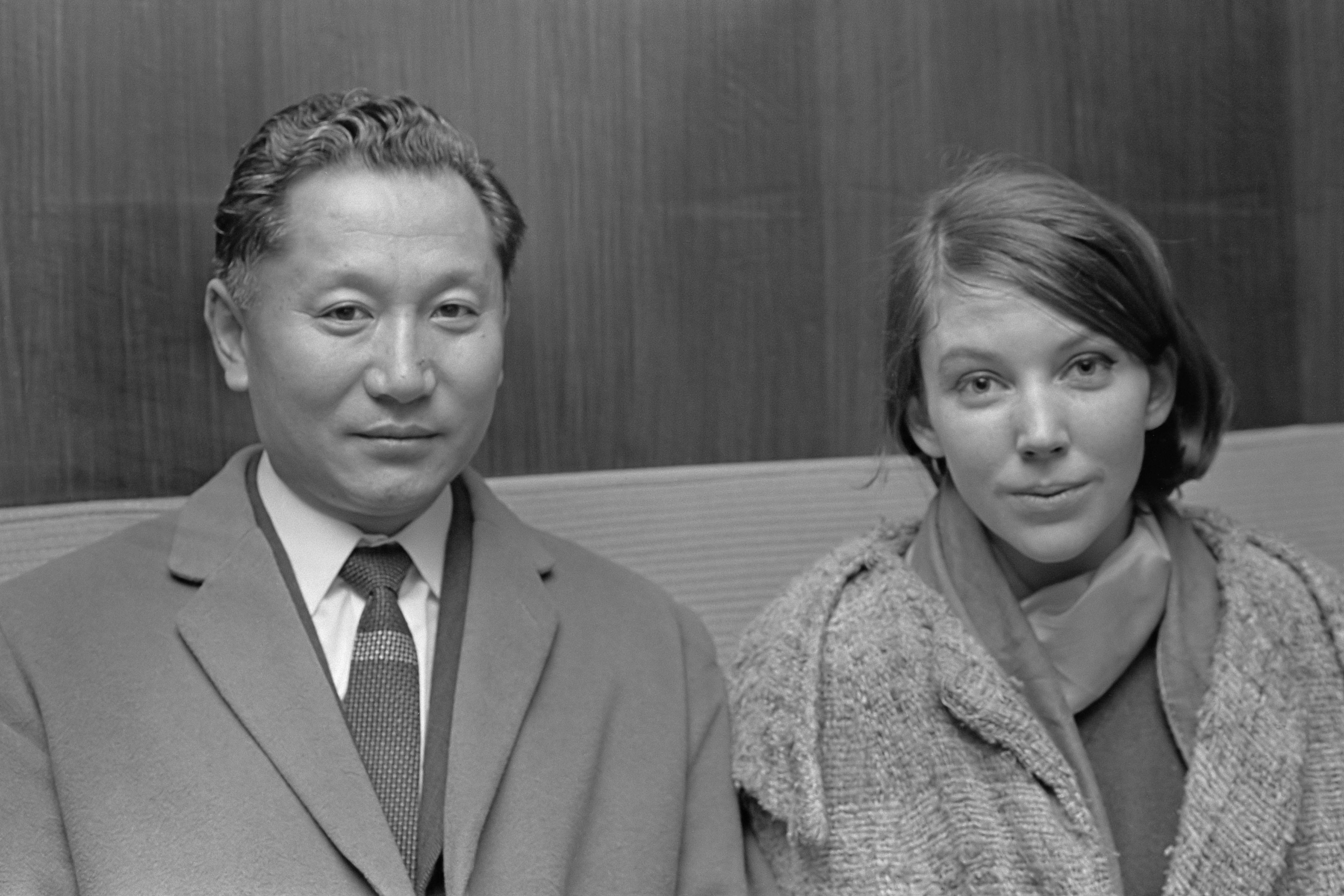
King and Queen of Sikkim, 1966

In 1963, Namgyal married Hope Cooke, a 22-year-old American socialite from New York City; she was a graduate of Sarah Lawrence College in Yonkers in the state of New York. The marriage brought worldwide media attention to Sikkim. The couple, who had two children, divorced in 1980.

Shortly after Namgyal's marriage, his father died and he was crowned the new Chogyal on an astrologically favourable date in 1965. In 1975, the Prime Minister of Sikkim appealed to the Indian Parliament for Sikkim to become a state of India.

In April of that year, the Indian Army took over the city of Gangtok and disarmed the Chogyal's palace guards. A referendum on abolishing the monarchy was held in the Kingdom of Sikkim on 14 April 1975 and the people of Sikkim voted 59,637 to 1,496 for Indian statehood and the ouster of their Chogyal, or ruler, Palden Thondup Namgyal, who was under Indian army guard in his palace in Gangtok.

In November 1976, Namgyal allegedly attempted suicide by consuming barbiturates and was airlifted to IPGMER and SSKM Hospital. He was successfully treated by Professor Dr. Amal Kumar Bose, Head of the Department of Anesthesia and Respiratory Care Unit at the SSKM hospital.

Namgyal died of cancer at the Memorial Sloan Kettering Cancer Center in New York City, United States on 29 January 1982. He was 58 years old at the time of his death. Upon his death, 31 members of the State Legislative Assembly offered khadas to the Chogyal as a mark of respect.

=== Other interests ===
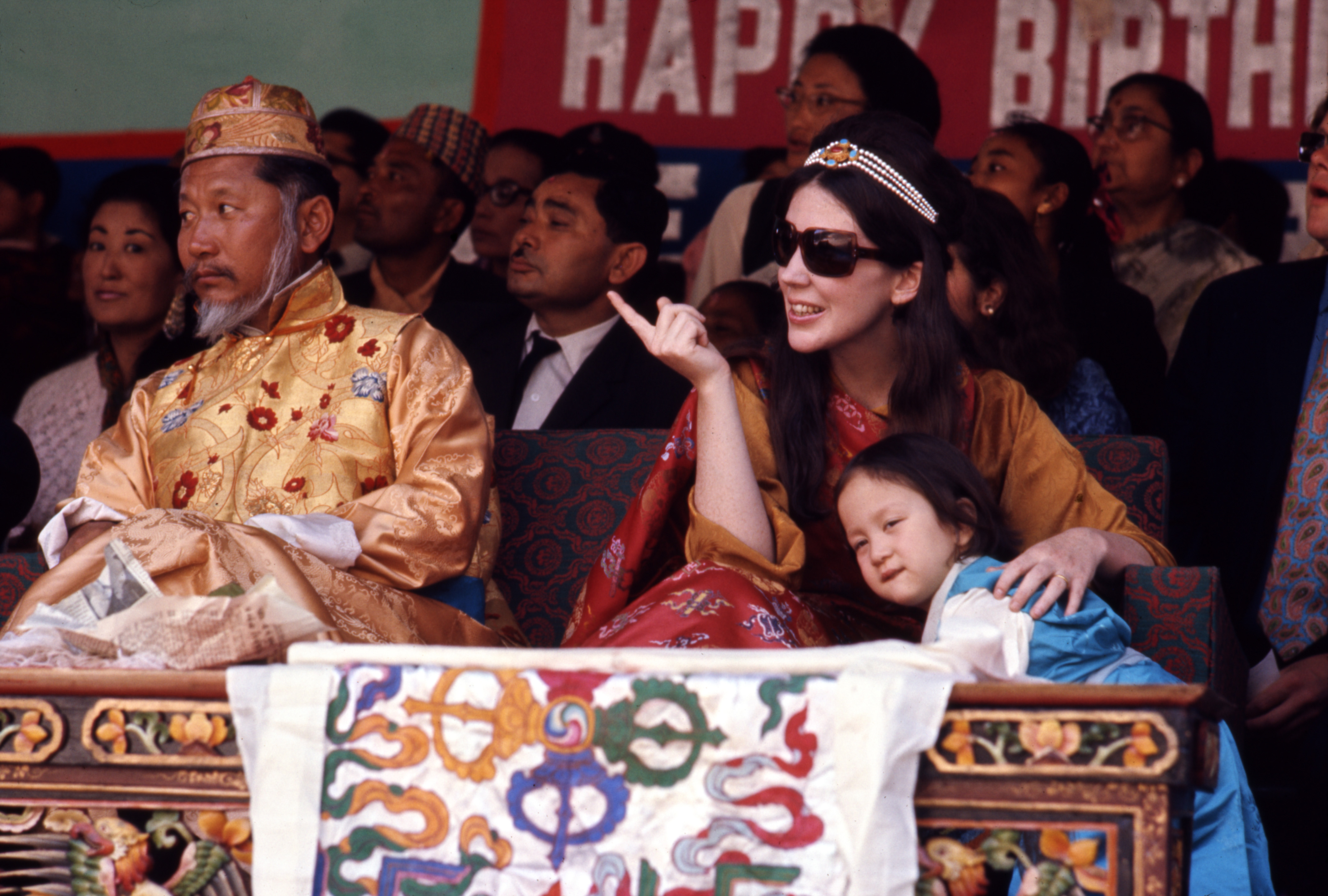
King and Queen of Sikkim and their daughter watch birthday celebrations in Gangtok, Sikkim, May 1971

Namgyal was an amateur radio operator, call-sign AC3PT, and was a highly sought after contact on the airwaves. The international callbook listed his address as: P.T. Namgyal, The Palace, Gangtok, Sikkim.

He financed the documentary Sikkim (1971) by Indian filmmaker Satyajit Ray.

== Legacy ==
Namgyal shaped a "model Asian state" where the literacy rate and per capita income were twice as high as neighbours Nepal, Bhutan and India.

His first son, the former crown prince Tenzing Kunzang Jigme Namgyal, died in 1978 in a car accident. His second son from his first marriage, Tobgyal Wangchuk Tenzing Namgyal, was named the 13th Chogyal, but the position no longer confers any official authority.

His son from his second marriage, Palden Gyurmed Namgyal, moved to New York aged nine with his mother and sister, being educated at Dalton School. He went on to work for JPMorgan Chase, becoming a managing director. He was dismissed in 2003 following an incident of sexual harassment against a colleague.

== Honours ==
- Kingdom of Sikkim:
  - Order of the Precious Jewel of the Heart of Sikkim (Founder), September 1972
- India:
  - Padma Vibhushan, 22 February 1954
- United Kingdom
  - Order of the British Empire (OBE), 1 January 1947
  - Indian Independence Medal, 1948
- France
  - Order of the Black Star (Commandeur), 1956
- Nepal
  - King Mahendra Investiture Medal, 2 May 1956
  - King Birendra Investiture Medal, 24 February 1975
- Bhutan
  - King Jigme Singye Investiture Medal, 2 June 1974

== See also ==
- History of Sikkim

Palden Thondup Namgyal House of Namgyal Born: 23 May 1923 Died: 29 January 1982
Regnal titles
| Preceded by Tashi Namgyal | Chogyal of Sikkim; 2 December 1963 – 10 April 1975 | Title abolished Sikkim accession to India |
Titles in pretence
| New title | — TITULAR — Chogyal of Sikkim; 10 April 1975 – 29 January 1982; Reason for succession failure: Sikkim accession to India | Succeeded by Wangchuk Namgyal |
