= Paul Simons =

Paul Simons may refer to:

- Paul E. Simons, American diplomat and government official
- Paul Simons (resistance fighter), Dutch resistance fighter

== See also ==
- Paul Simmons (disambiguation)
