= Desson Thomson =

American journalist (born 1958)

- Born: Desson Patrick Thomson; 1958 (age 67–68); Surrey, England
- Education: American University
- Occupations: Journalist and speechwriter

Desson Patrick Thomson is an American journalist, film critic, and former government speechwriter. He is known for his long tenure as a film critic for The Washington Post and his later work as a speechwriter for the U.S. Department of State during the Obama administration. He also served as the Director of Executive Communications for the Motion Picture Association of America (MPAA), the principal lobbying organization for the U.S. film industry.

== Early life and education ==
Thomson grew up in the United Kingdom. He graduated from American University in Washington, D.C., where he majored in communications and cinema studies. His early interest in film and cultural criticism led him into a career in entertainment journalism.

== Career ==
=== Career at The Washington Post ===
Thomson joined The Washington Post in the 1980s, initially working as a copy aide before transitioning to film criticism. He became a staff film critic in the Weekend and Style sections, a position he held for over two decades.

Known for his vivid writing style and critical insight, Thomson wrote hundreds of reviews, features, and essays on cinema.

In 1987, when he named Todd Haynes’s Superstar: The Karen Carpenter Story, an indie film which employed Barbie dolls, the best movie of that year, and in years such as 2007 when he named Zodiac, No Country for Old Men, and The Diving Bell and the Butterfly among the best films of the year, he signaled his preference for auteur-driven, innovative storytelling.

Throughout his career, Thomson often advocated for originality in filmmaking and was critical of Hollywood’s reliance on remakes and formulaic content. In a widely read column, he criticized the film industry for revisiting classic movies without offering fresh creative value, arguing that remakes represented a decline in artistic ambition.

=== Work in Public Service ===
After leaving The Washington Post, Thomson transitioned into political communications. He joined the U.S. Department of State during Hillary Clinton’s tenure as Secretary of State, serving as a speechwriter. He continued in this role under Secretary John Kerry, contributing to major policy addresses and public diplomacy initiatives. His colleagues during this time included other former journalists, such as Glen Johnson and Douglas Frantz.

=== Selected Work and Commentary ===
As a critic, Thomson was known for championing independent films and international cinema, while also engaging with popular Hollywood productions. His film reviews, essays, and cultural commentary appeared regularly in The Washington Post from the late 1980s through the mid-2000s. He has been featured in interviews, panel discussions, and retrospectives on film criticism, and his writings continue to be cited in scholarly and journalistic works on cinema.

Thomson is also known for his reflections on cinema’s capacity to explore complex themes, as illustrated in his 2020 article "Set Your Phasers to Spiritual—A Movie Watchlist for Contemplating the Big Stuff, where he recommended films noted for their contemplative pacing and spiritual resonance. His writing blends a passion for film history with cultural insight, encouraging audiences to reconsider slower, more meditative cinematic works in light of contemporary challenges.

=== Musical career ===
In addition to his work as a political speechwriter and former film critic, Thomson is also a musician, singer, and songwriter. He was the co-founder and lead vocalist of the Washington, D.C.–based band Cairo Fred, which he formed in 2000 alongside longtime friend, collaborator and guitarist/pianist Bradford Heck, who died in 2025. In 2022, Thomson and Heck's songs receive 5 awards, including honorable mentions in the Songwriters Association of Washington contest, and an honorable mention the following year under the "Open" category due to the genre-defying nature of their work. Beyond Cairo Fred, Thomson has performed in numerous tribute concerts for BandHouse Gigs and Newmyer Flyer, honoring artists such as Joni Mitchell, David Bowie, Bruce Springsteen, Tom Petty, Burt Bacharach and Hal David, and the British New Wave. He is also known for his theatrical role as Dr. Frank-N-Furter in stage productions of The Rocky Horror Picture Show.
