= Ruth A. Davis =

American diplomat (1943–2025)

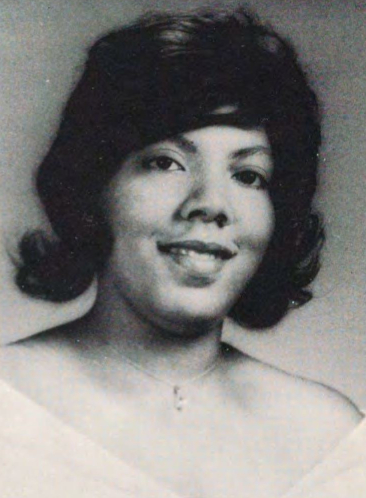
- Davis in the Spelman College yearbook, 1966

24th Director General of the Foreign Service
- In office June 15, 2001 – June 30, 2003
- President: George W. Bush
- Preceded by: Marc Isaiah Grossman
- Succeeded by: W. Robert Pearson

United States Ambassador to The Republic of Benin
- In office December 24, 1992 – November 3, 1995
- President: George H. W. Bush
- Preceded by: Harriet Winsar Isom
- Succeeded by: John M. Yates

17th Director of the Foreign Service Institute
- In office July 14, 1997 – June 1, 2000
- Preceded by: Teresita Currie Schaffer
- Succeeded by: Katherine Hubay Peterson

Personal details
- Born: May 28, 1943 Phoenix, Arizona, U.S.
- Died: May 3, 2025 (aged 81) Washington, D.C., U.S.
- Education: Spelman College (BA); University of California, Berkeley (MSW)

Ruth Amy Davis (May 28, 1943 – May 3, 2025) was an American diplomat. Davis served as the 24th director general of the United States Foreign Service. She was the first woman of color to be appointed Director General of the Foreign Service and the first African-American director of the Foreign Service Institute. In 2002, she earned the personal rank of Career Ambassador, the highest rank in the U.S. Foreign Service. She was the Chief of Staff of the Africa Bureau of the U.S. Department of State.

== Early life ==
Ambassador Davis was born May 28, 1943, in Phoenix, Arizona, to the late Anderson and Edith Mallet Davis. She grew up in Atlanta, Georgia and later recalled cross-country vacations with her parents and sister Jean sparked an interest in the different languages she heard – Spanish in New Mexico and Chinese languages in California. Davis was raised primarily in the southern United States, and she and her family experienced racial segregation during the Jim Crow era.

Davis graduated with honors from Booker T. Washington High School in Atlanta, Georgia and graduated Magna Cum Laude from Spelman College. At Spelman, she was awarded the prestigious Merrill Scholarship which financed 15 months of French language studies and travel throughout Europe and the Middle East, specifically Egypt, Lebanon, Syria, Jordan, and Israel. During this time abroad, Davis met students from newly-formed independent African nations who were inspired to begin nation building in their respective countries. Davis later recalled that she was inspired by the students and their desire to define their own futures. This created a personal calling for her to join in the nation building process in Africa.

Davis received funding for graduate studies through the Ford Foundation program which sought to increase minority representation within the State Department. Davis received her Master of Social Work in 1968 from the University of California, Berkeley^{[1]} and later received Doctorate’s from Spelman in 1998 and Middlebury college in 2000.

== Early diplomatic career ==
Ambassador Davis entered the U.S. Foreign Service as a Consular Officer in 1969. Specializing in American citizens services and visa issues, she served in Kinshasa, Zaire, now the Democratic Republic of the Congo; Nairobi, Kenya; Tokyo, Japan, and Naples, Italy. In Washington, D.C. Davis served in Mayor Marion Barry’s office as a Pearson Fellow where she was credited with improving the District’s involvement in the international, economic, and diplomatic arenas.

== Ambassadorial and senior leadership ==
Davis achieved a long list of “firsts” during her highly decorated 40-year diplomatic career. In 1982, she became the first African-American Senior Watch Officer in the State Department’s Operations Center, which monitors current events worldwide. In 1987, Davis was appointed U.S. Consul General in Barcelona, where she was instrumental in securing a new consulate building to safeguard and protect staff. Davis was also a leading advocate and supporter of the 1992 Barcelona Olympic Games. Later, she was credited in supporting the Atlanta delegation’s successful winning bid to host the 1996 Summer Olympics in her hometown of Atlanta.

Davis was the U.S. Ambassador to the Republic of Benin from 1992 to 1995. As ambassador, she championed girls’ education and helped develop democratic institutions in the country. She dedicated her professional accomplishment of becoming an ambassador to her father.

Davis served as the Principal Deputy Assistant Secretary for Consular Affairs (1995–1997). In 2001, Davis was appointed by President George W. Bush to the post of Director General of the Foreign Service, the first African-American woman to hold the position. As Director General, she doubled the size of the Thomas R. Pickering Program and established the Charles B. Rangel Program. Both programs were designed to ensure the ranks of the Department reflect the composition of the United States at all levels as prescribed by the Foreign Service Act of 1980.

Prior to assuming this position, Davis served as director of the Foreign Service Institute from 1997 to 2001 where she established the School of Leadership and Management. Shortly thereafter, Secretary of State Colin Powell expanded Davis’ vision by establishing mandatory mid- and senior-level leadership training. Following her retirement, the director’s conference room at the Foreign Service Institute was dedicated in her honor. She later served as Distinguished Advisor at the Ralph Bunche International Affairs Center at Howard University from 2003 until 2005.

Described as a "diplomatic pioneer," Davis worked diligently to increase diversity among the ranks of the diplomatic corps. During her tenure, she was successful in attracting more diverse people into the Foreign Service.

Her leadership as president of the Thursday Luncheon Group (TLG) established a sense of community and camaraderie among the African-American Foreign Service and Civil Service diplomatic ranks and further advanced TLG’s mission in promoting the formulation, articulation and implementation of U.S. foreign policy. In her capacity as TLG President, she led efforts in 1997 to name the State Department’s library after Nobel Peace Prize winner Ralph Bunche. Ambassador Davis retired from the Foreign Service in 2009.

== Post retirement and legacy ==
Ambassador Davis contributed her notable expertise to several books and documentaries promoting international affairs, adding credibility as a distinguished voice in the field. She took part in interviews sharing her words of wisdom for the publication of the Young Black Leaders Guide to a Successful Career in International Affairs (2022). She participated in bringing Ebenezer Bassett’s story as the first ambassadorial-level Black diplomat assigned overseas to Haiti in 1869 to light in the 2019 documentary by Christopher Teal, “A Diplomat of Consequence.” Ambassador Davis also drafted the foreword for Ambassador Charles Ray’s Ethical Dilemmas and the Practice of Diplomacy (2017) and DeAngela Burns-Wallace’s book Made for This (2026).

She remained active in women’s empowerment issues as Founder and Chair of the International Women’s Entrepreneurial Challenge (IWEC) from 2006–2023; the Co-Chairwoman of the ACE Global Leaders of Excellence Network; the Chair of the International Mission of Mercy USA (IMMUSA); and Vice President of the Association of Black American Ambassadors (ABAA). She was a member of the Board of Visitors of the Defense Language Institute in Monterrey, CA, the Board of the Diplomacy Center Foundation, and a member of the 16th and Decatur Church of Christ in Washington, D.C.

In 2016, Ruth A. Davis was presented the Lifetime Contributions to American Diplomacy Award by the American Foreign Service Association.

== Later life and death ==
Davis died from pneumonia in Washington, D.C., on May 3, 2025, at the age of 81. Following her passing, the Phoenix Rising Committee was established to honor her legacy. The committee fundraised and endowed a scholarship in Ambassador Ruth A. Davis’ name at Spelman College in December 2025. The committee also maintains a newsletter and organizes activities and events to promote Ambassador Davis’ life and legacy. On May 27, 2026, the Association of Black American Ambassadors launched the inaugural Ambassador Ruth A. Davis Memorial Lecture Series in partnership with George Washington University’s Elliott School, Phoenix Rising Committee and a host of co-sponsors. Former U.S. Ambassador to the United Nations Ambassador Linda Thomas-Greenfield served as the inaugural speaker.

== Awards ==
- Honorary Doctor of Laws Spelman College (1998)
- U.S. State Department Arnold L. Raphel Memorial Award (1999)
- U.S. State Department Superior Honor Award (1999)
- Presidential Distinguished Service Award (President Bill Clinton) (1999)
- Honorary Doctor of Laws Middlebury College (2000)
- Presidential Distinguished Service Award (President George W. Bush) (2002)
- U.S. Secretary of State Distinguished Service Award (2003)
- U.S. State Department Equal Employment Opportunity Award (2005)
- The Director General’s Cup for the Foreign Service (2011)
- American Foreign Service Association Lifetime Contributions to American Diplomacy Award (2016)

Diplomatic posts
Preceded by Harriet Winsar Isom	United States Ambassador to Benin; 1992–1995	Succeeded by John M. Yates
