= State Magazine =

Digital magazine published by the US State Department

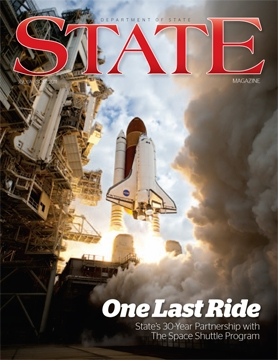
- Cover of the July/August 2011 issue
- Categories: Magazine
- Frequency: Monthly
- Circulation: 34,500 (2010)
- Publisher: Bureau of Global Talent Management
- First issue: March 20, 1947
- Final issue: October 2015 (print) No Longer published as of May 2025 (https://statemag.state.gov/2025/01/2025-digital-archive/)
- Country: United States
- Based in: Washington, D.C.
- Language: English
- Website: statemag.state.gov
- ISSN: 1099-4165

State Magazine was a digital magazine published by the U.S. Department of State's Bureau of Global Talent Management. The last digital issue appeared in May 2025. The mission of the magazine was to acquaint Department of State employees at home and abroad with developments affecting operations and personnel, and to facilitate communication between management and employees.

The interactive magazine was published 11 times per year, with a combined July and August issue, and features news of interest to employees, retirees and the general public. In October 2015 the print edition was cancelled and it became an online-only publication.

== History ==
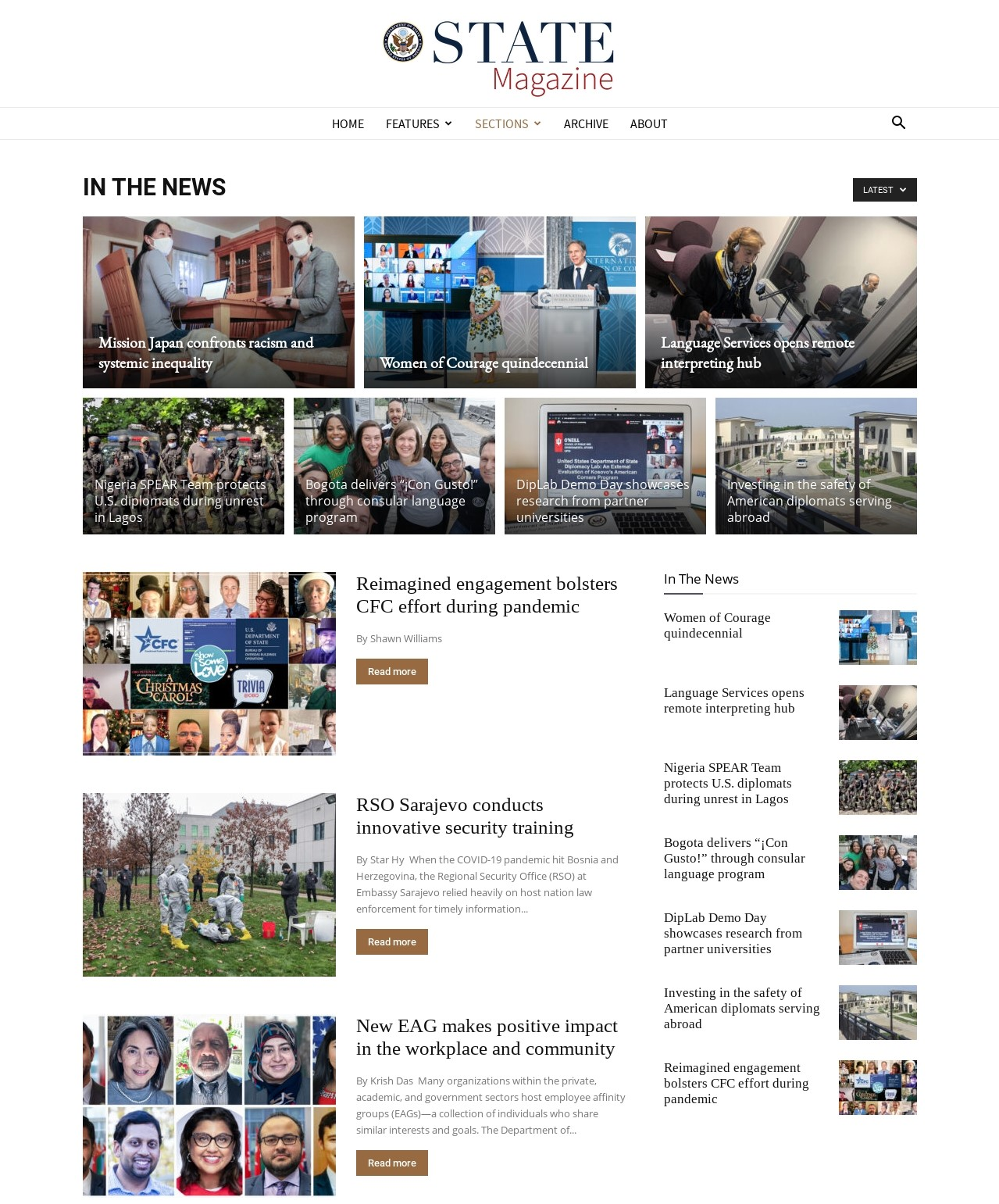
April 2021 screenshot of the magazine's online edition

The first Foreign Service News Letter was dated March 20, 1947, and was published monthly by the office of the Director General of the United States Foreign Service to "acquaint members of the Foreign Service with plans and developments of interest to or which may affect operations or personnel in the field." The Foreign Service News Letter's final issue, Number 170, was dated April 15, 1961.

A Department Notice dated April 21, 1961, announced that "the Foreign Service News Letter, formerly published by the Director General of the Foreign Service, will be retitled the Department of State News Letter and published by the Bureau of Administration, effective with the issue of May 15, 1961." In its new form, the News Letter was intended to "acquaint the Department's officers and employees, at home and abroad, with developments of interest which may affect operations or personnel."

Issue number 1 of the Department of State News Letter appeared on May 16, 1961. The final issue, number 229, was published in December, 1980. It was immediately succeeded by the January, 1981, publication of State, which continued the News Letter's numbering with issues 230-378. In 1996, with the June/July issue (number 379), the publication became State Magazine.

The 500th issue of State Magazine was published in April 2006. The occasion was marked with a revamped design and a retrospective article that recounted major events covered during the preceding 45 years.

Citing fiscal and environmental benefits, State Magazine transitioned to a dynamic digital-only multimedia publication available online and via mobile app on web-enabled Apple iOS and Android devices, beginning with the October 2015 issue.

== Regular segments ==
- From the D.G.: A monthly column written by the Director General of the Foreign Service
- Diversity Notes: Written each month by the director of the Department of State's Office of Civil Rights
- Post of the Month: A monthly spotlight on an embassy, diplomatic mission or consulate with special insight on the host city
- Office Spotlight: Focuses on one of the Department's unique offices
- In the News: Short news article from around the Department
- Appointments, Retirements and Obituaries: A listing of personnel actions and announcements
- End State: A back-page photo spread highlighting a location featured in the issue
- Lying in State: Each issue features a cartoon of humorous characters and situations inspired by life at the Department of State

== Online editions ==
Archives of the browser edition of State Magazine can be found on the State Magazine page of the Department of State's website. Hathitrust has digitized uploads of all of the issues of the Department of State News Letter (1961-1980) available online.

== See also ==
- Diplomatic missions of the United States
- United States Foreign Service
