= Carol Z. Perez =

American diplomat and government official

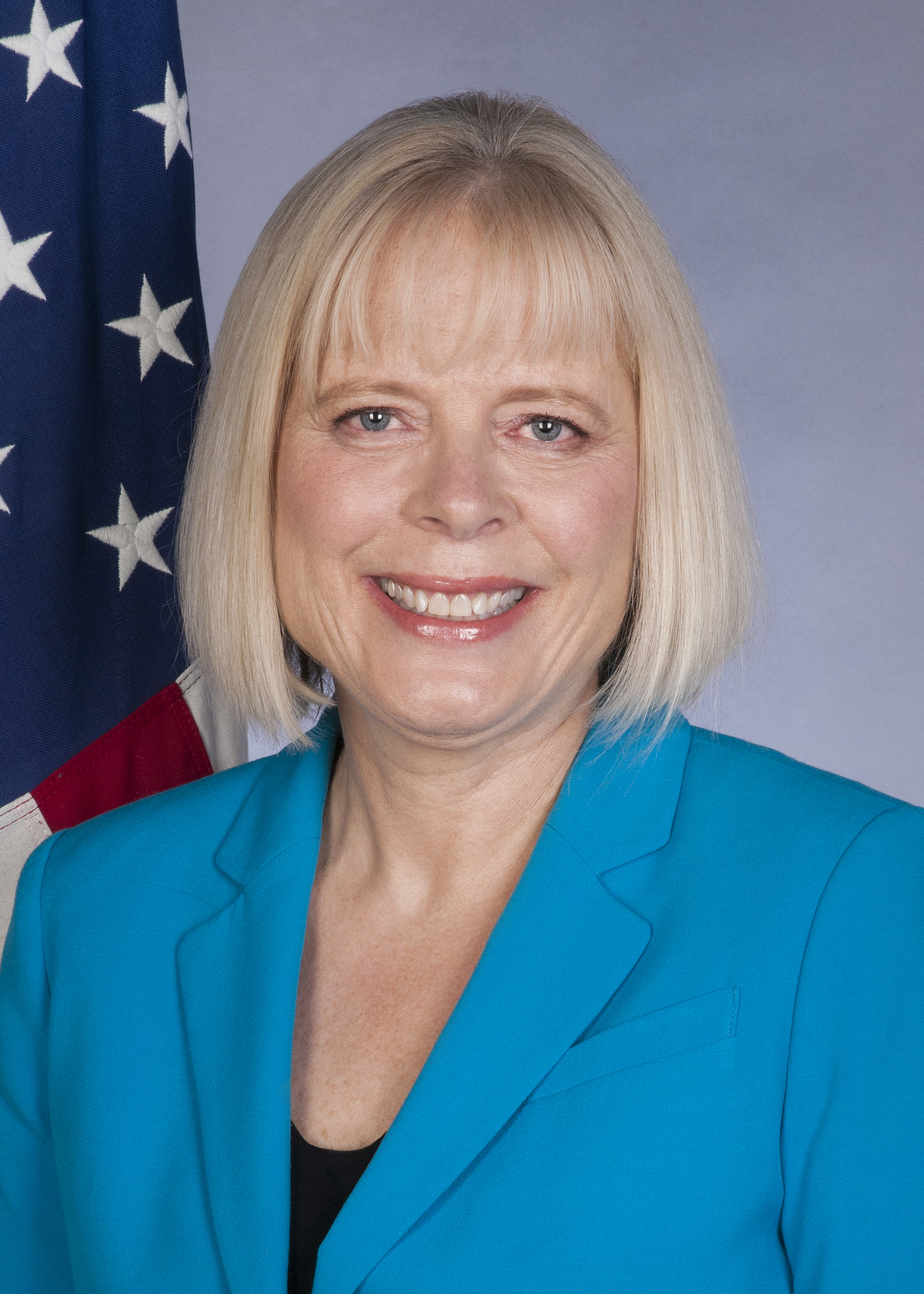

Acting Under Secretary of State for Management
- In office January 20, 2021 – December 29, 2021
- President: Joe Biden
- Secretary: Antony Blinken
- Preceded by: Brian Bulatao
- Succeeded by: John R. Bass

31st Director General of the Foreign Service
- In office February 1, 2019 – June 6, 2022
- President: Donald Trump; Joe Biden
- Preceded by: Arnold A. Chacón
- Succeeded by: Marcia Bernicat

United States Ambassador to Chile
- In office October 13, 2016 – January 31, 2019
- President: Barack Obama; Donald Trump
- Preceded by: Michael A. Hammer
- Succeeded by: Bernadette Meehan

Personal details
- Born: Cleveland, Ohio, U.S.
- Children: 3
- Education: Hiram College; George Washington University

Carol Zelis Perez (born in Cleveland) is a career Foreign Service Officer, who previously served as the Director General of the Foreign Service. Perez served as the U.S. Ambassador to Chile from October 2016 to January 2019.

== Early life and education ==
Perez was born in Cleveland, Ohio, and graduated from Marymount High School in nearby Garfield Heights in 1971. She earned a Bachelor of Arts in political science at Hiram College in 1975 and subsequently a master's degree in health care administration at George Washington University.

== Career ==
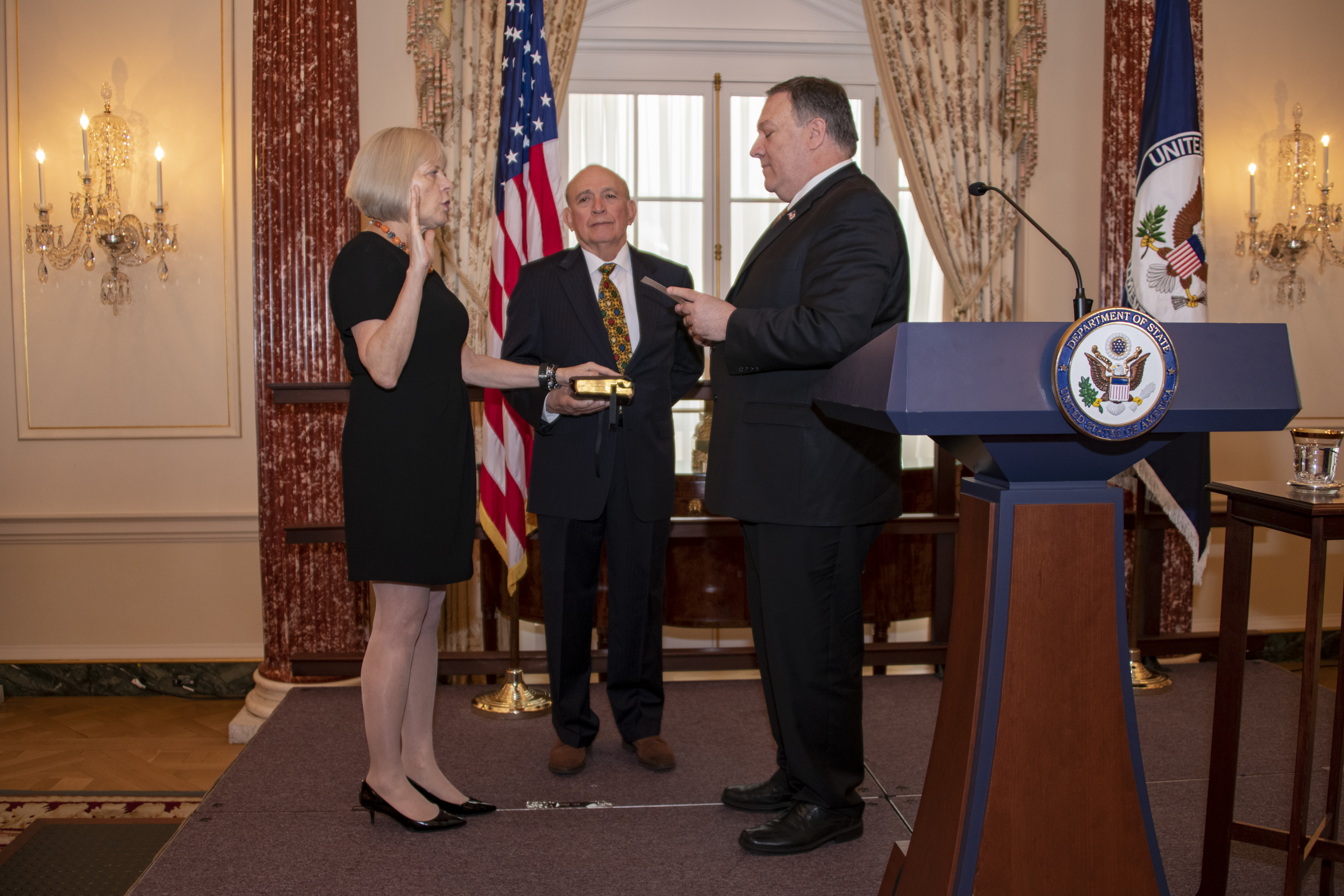
Secretary of State Mike Pompeo ceremonially swears Perez in as Director General of the Foreign Service and Director of Human Resources in 2019

Perez joined the U.S. State Department in 1987. Most of her assignments have been Management in nature, with early postings as a special assistant in the office of the Under Secretary of State for Management, and as operations officer in the State Department Operations Center. Perez served in Italy, Spain, and in Chile.

In 1994, Perez was made administrative and human relations officer at the U.S. Embassy in Rome. She returned to Washington in 1997 for a series of seventh floor and leadership assignments, first as a supervisory general services officer, deputy executive director in the Executive Secretariat; then the following year as office director in the Secretariat staff office; and beginning in 1999 as deputy executive secretary. She was assigned overseas in 2001.

Two years later, she was reassigned to Washington as Deputy Executive Secretary of the department. Part of her duties were organizing and staffing trips made by Secretary of State Colin Powell and Condoleezza Rice. In 2009, Perez was named Consul General in Milan.

Perez returned to Washington in 2011 as Deputy Assistant Secretary in the Bureau of International Narcotics and Law Enforcement Affairs. She was named Principal Deputy Assistant Secretary in the bureau in 2013 and helped coordinate anti-drug-trafficking efforts in Haiti, Ukraine and the South China Sea. In January 2015, Perez became Principal Deputy Assistant Secretary in the Bureau of Human Resources.

On May 10, 2016, Perez was nominated by President Barack Obama to be U.S. Ambassador to Chile. Perez testified before the Senate Foreign Relations Committee on June 21, 2016, and was confirmed on July 14, 2016. Perez is the first ever woman ambassador accredited to Chile.

On July 31, 2018, President Donald Trump announced his intent to nominate Perez as the Director General of the Foreign Service. On August 1, 2018, her nomination was sent to the United States Senate. She was confirmed by the Senate on a voice vote on January 2, 2019, and sworn in on February 1, 2019. She left post on June 6, 2022.

== Personal life ==
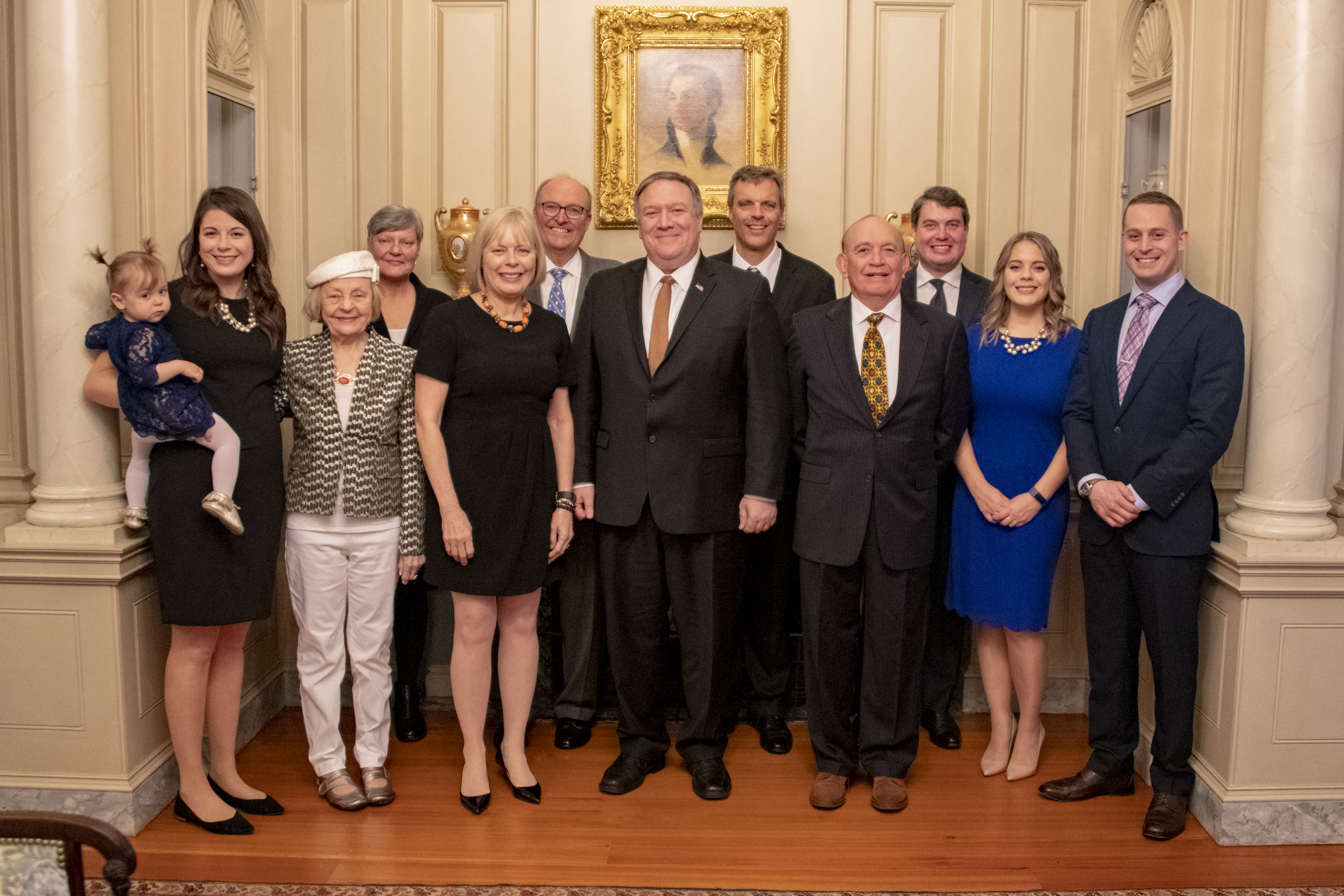
Perez's family at her swearing-in ceremony in 2019

Perez and her husband, Al, have three children, Michael, Caroline and Marisa. In addition to English, Perez speaks Spanish and Italian.

Diplomatic posts
Preceded by Brian Bulatao	Under Secretary of State for Management; Acting; 2021	Succeeded by John R. Bass
Preceded by Michael A. Hammer	U.S. Ambassador to Chile; 2016–2019	Succeeded by Bernadette Meehan
Preceded by Arnold Chacón	Director General of the Foreign Service; 2019–2022	Succeeded by Marcia Bernicat
