= Alejandro Daniel Wolff =

American diplomat

Alex Wolff
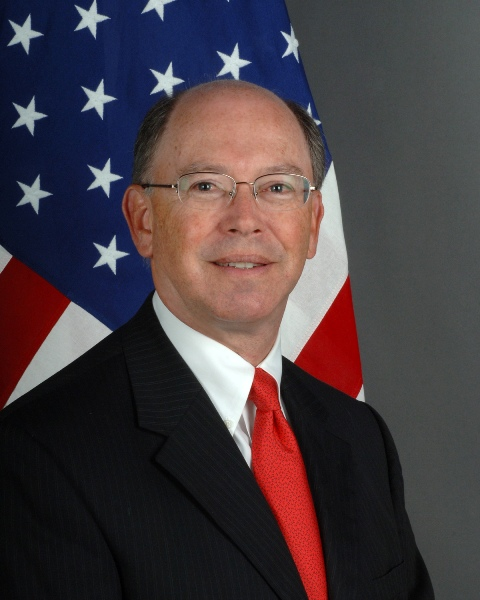

United States Ambassador to Chile
- In office October 25, 2010 – August 10, 2013
- President: Barack Obama
- Preceded by: Paul Simons
- Succeeded by: Michael A. Hammer

United States Ambassador to the United Nations
- Acting
- In office December 31, 2006 – April 30, 2007
- President: George W. Bush
- Preceded by: John R. Bolton
- Succeeded by: Zalmay Khalilzad

Personal details
- Born: 1956 (age 69–70)
- Children: 2
- Education: University of California, Los Angeles (BA)

Alejandro Daniel Wolff (born 1956) is an American diplomat who served as the US ambassador to Chile from 2010 to 2013. He was the acting U.S. permanent representative to the United Nations until Zalmay Khalilzad was appointed as permanent representative. He was made the representative after the resignation of John Bolton on December 9, 2006. Previously he had been the deputy U.S. representative to the United Nations.

He graduated from UCLA in 1978. Wolff joined the U.S. Department of State as a foreign service officer in 1979. His assignments in Washington include tours on the Policy Planning Staff (1981–1982); in the Office of Soviet Union Affairs (1988–1989); in the Office of the Under Secretary for Political Affairs (1989–1991); as deputy executive secretary of the department (1996–1998); and as the executive assistant to secretaries of state Madeleine Albright and Colin Powell (1998–2001).

Wolff has served in Algeria, Morocco, Chile, Cyprus, the U.S. Mission to the European Union in Brussels and France. His most recent assignment was ambassador and deputy permanent U.S. Representative to the United Nations (2005–2010).

Wolff is the recipient of the Department of State's Distinguished, Superior, and Meritorious Honor Awards. He is married, with two children, and speaks French and Spanish.

Wolff is an advisory board member of the Counter Extremism Project.

Diplomatic posts
Preceded by John R. Bolton	United States Ambassador to the United Nations; Acting; 2006–2007	Succeeded by Zalmay Khalilzad
Preceded by Paul Simons	United States Ambassador to Chile; 2010–2013	Succeeded by Michael A. Hammer
