= Marcia Bernicat =

American diplomat (born 1953)

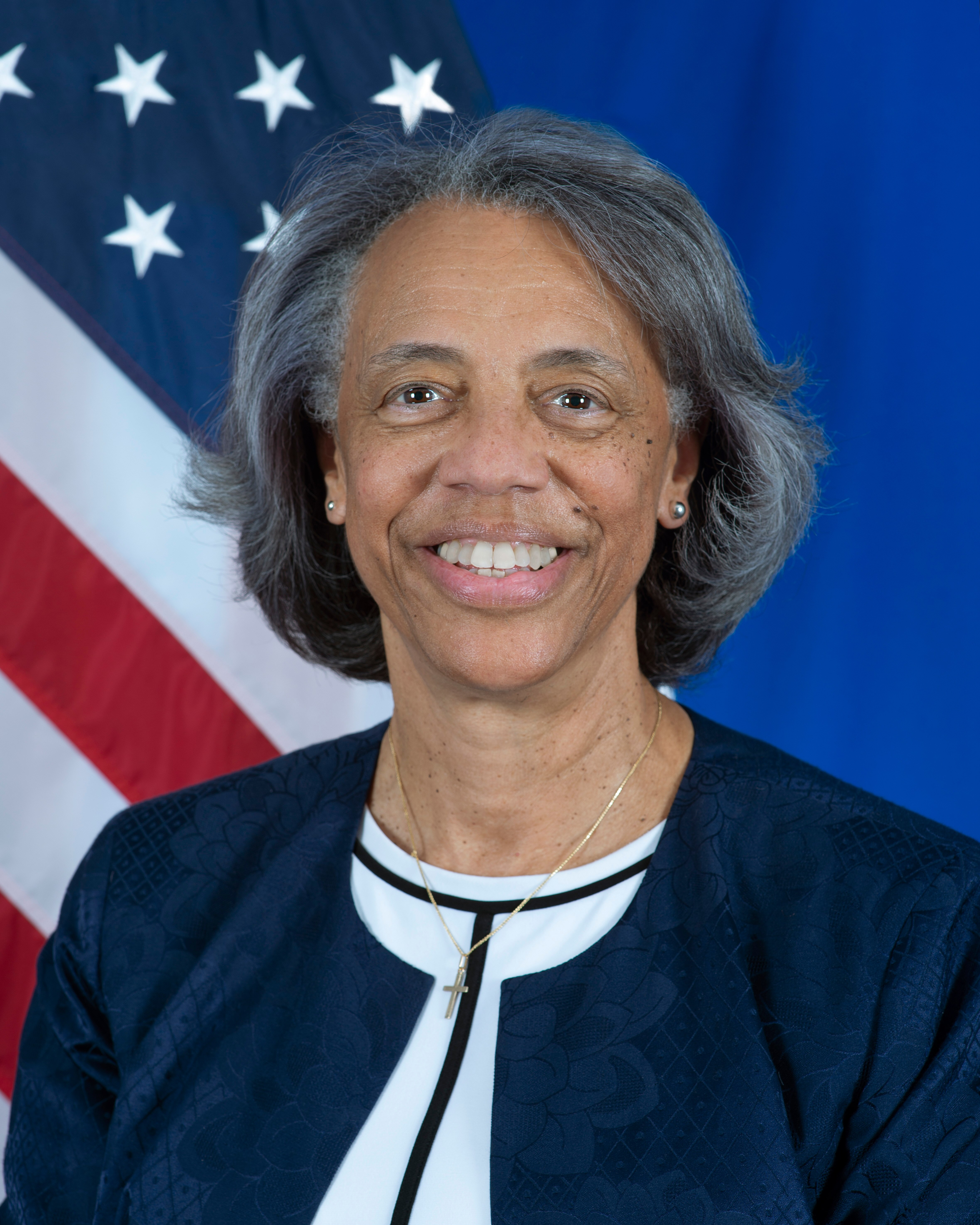

32nd Director General of the Foreign Service
- In office June 6, 2022 – January 20, 2025
- President: Joe Biden
- Preceded by: Carol Z. Perez

Assistant Secretary of State for Oceans and International Environmental and Scientific Affairs
- Acting
- In office August 6, 2021 – September 28, 2021
- President: Joe Biden
- Preceded by: Jonathan M. Moore
- Succeeded by: Monica Medina

Under Secretary of State for Economic Growth, Energy, and the Environment
- Acting
- In office January 20, 2021 – August 5, 2021
- President: Joe Biden
- Preceded by: Keith J. Krach
- Succeeded by: Jose W. Fernandez

United States Ambassador to Bangladesh
- In office February 4, 2015 – November 2, 2018
- President: Barack Obama; Donald Trump
- Preceded by: Dan Mozena
- Succeeded by: Earl R. Miller

United States Ambassador to Senegal United States Ambassador to Guinea-Bissau
- In office August 6, 2008 – July 15, 2011
- President: George W. Bush; Barack Obama
- Preceded by: Janice L. Jacobs
- Succeeded by: Lewis Lukens

Personal details
- Born: 1953 (age 72–73)
- Spouse: Olivier Bernicat (div. 2021)
- Education: Lafayette College (BA); Georgetown University (MS)

Marcia Stephens Bloom Bernicat (born 1953) is an American diplomat who served as the 32nd Director General of the Foreign Service from 2022 to 2025. She is a former United States Ambassador to Bangladesh. She served as Ambassador to Senegal and Guinea-Bissau from 2008 to 2011. From January 1, 2019, to April 3, 2020, she was Principal Deputy Assistant Secretary in the Bureau of Oceans and International Environmental and Scientific Affairs at the Department of State.

== Early life and education ==
Bernicat was born in 1953. She grew up in Tinton Falls, New Jersey and graduated from Monmouth Regional High School. In 1975 she earned a B.A. from Lafayette College, where she majored in history. Through work with her mentor and thesis advisor, she became particularly interested in the League of Nations and the relationship between the United States and the United Nations. She earned an M.S. in Foreign Service from Georgetown University in 1980.

== Career ==
Bernicat began her career working in a managerial position at Procter & Gamble in Staten Island, New York.

In 1982, Bernicat began her career as a Foreign Service Officer at the U.S. embassy in Bamako, the capital of Mali. She served as consular officer at the U.S. consulate general in Marseille, France from 1984 to 1986. From 1986 to 1989 she held position in the U.S., but successive moves after that had her assigned in India, Morocco, Malawi and Barbados. From 2006 to 2008 she was office director for several Asian countries. In that role she was engaged in negotiations to supply India with non-military nuclear materials. She was nominated by George W. Bush in 2008 to be U.S. Ambassador to Senegal and Guinea-Bissau.

From 2012 to 2014 Bernicat served as Deputy Assistant Secretary in the Bureau of Human Resources at the Department of State. In 2014 she was nominated and confirmed as U.S. Ambassador to Bangladesh. She spoke with the Senate Foreign Relations Committee about Bangladesh, noting that it is the eighth largest country in the world by population and third largest Muslim majority nation. Bangladesh, she observed, is known for traditions that are moderate and pluralistic.

=== Biden administration ===
On April 15, 2021, President Joe Biden announced his intent to nominate Bernicat to serve as the Director General of the Foreign Service. On April 28, 2021, her nomination was sent to the Senate. On September 15, 2021, a hearing on her nomination was held before the Senate Foreign Relations Committee. On October 19, 2021, her nomination was reported favorably out of committee. On May 26, 2022, the United States Senate confirmed her nomination by an 82–10 vote. She began service on May 31, 2022, and was sworn in by Deputy Secretary Brian P. McKeon on June 6, 2022. On January 15, 2025, incoming President Trump asked Bernicat to resign.

== Personal life ==
Bernicat speaks French, Hindi and Russian. She is married to Olivier Bernicat and they have two children.

Diplomatic posts
Preceded by Dan Mozena	United States Ambassador to Bangladesh; 2015–2018	Succeeded by Earl R. Miller
