= Stephen G. McFarland =

American career diplomat

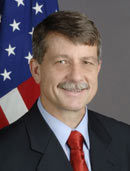

United States Ambassador to Guatemala
- In office 30 June 2008 – 25 August 2011
- President: George W. Bush; Barack Obama
- Preceded by: James M. Derham
- Succeeded by: Arnold A. Chacón

Personal details
- Born: December 21, 1954 (age 71) Tarrant County, Texas

Stephen George McFarland (born December 21, 1954, Tarrant County, Texas) is an American career diplomat and former United States Ambassador to Guatemala (from June 2008 to August 2011).

== Background ==
The son of a diplomat, George Albert McFarland Jr., Ambassador McFarland grew up in Latin America and the Middle East, as well as in central Texas and suburban Washington, D.C. He is a graduate of the Colegio Franklin Delano Roosevelt American School in Lima, Peru, Yale University, and the U.S. Air War College. He also attended the Marine Corps Platoon Leaders Course.

McFarland speaks fluent Spanish and some Guarani, and he is currently studying Kʼicheʼ, the second most widely spoken language in Guatemala after Spanish.

== Diplomatic career ==
He joined the Foreign Service in 1977, and was subsequently posted to Maracaibo, Venezuela. He has served in a series of assignments in Latin America focusing on U.S. support for democratic transitions, human rights, and security.

He has held positions including political officer in Ecuador and Peru, desk officer for Nicaragua, and political counselor in El Salvador, Bolivia, and Peru. He was the U.S. member of the interim cease-fire monitoring group on the Peru-Ecuador border in 1995, following the Cenepa War. He later served as the Deputy Chief of Mission and the Chargé d'Affaires in both Paraguay and Guatemala, as the Deputy Chief of Mission in Venezuela, and as the Director of Cuban Affairs in the Department of State.

Previously, he served as director of Stability Operations Training in the Foreign Service Institute of the United States Department of State. In 2007, he led a civilian-military Provincial Reconstruction Team embedded with Marine Corps Regimental Combat Team 2 in western Iraq.

== Ambassador to Guatemala ==
He was nominated to the position of Ambassador by President George W. Bush and Secretary of State Condoleezza Rice. On April 22, 2008 with then Senator Joseph Biden presiding before the Senate Foreign Relations Committee, his nomination confirmation was moved en bloc by Senator Biden, seconded by Senator John Kerry and approved unanimously by voice vote.

McFarland was sworn in as U.S. Ambassador to the Republic of Guatemala on June 30, 2008 by U.S. Deputy Secretary of State John Negroponte in Washington, D.C. He arrived as ambassador in Guatemala on August 5, 2008 with his wife Karin and four sons, Chris, Alex, Andrew, and Kevin.

Shortly after his arrival in Guatemala, he spoke about an espionage scandal. Guatemala's president Álvaro Colom announced that his office and home were bugged with cameras and listening devices. Ambassador McFarland described the situation as a "failure" of the Secretariat of Administrative Affairs and Security (SAAS).

During the nationwide violence of March 2009, the wife of Sergio Morales, Guatemala's Attorney General for Human Rights was kidnapped and tortured. Ambassador McFarland offered the full support of the US to investigate the crime.

== Coordinator of Rule of Law and Enforcement-Afghanistan ==
Ambassador McFarland learned Dari in the Foreign Service Institute in Arlington, VA up until January 2012. After his posting at the Foreign Service Institute, he assumed the post of Coordinator of Rule of Law and Enforcement in Kabul, Afghanistan.
