= Paul Simmons =

Paul Simmons may refer to:

- Paul Allen Simmons (1921–2014), U.S. federal judge
- Paul Simmons (drummer), American drummer (Th' Legendary Shack Shakers, The Reverend Horton Heat, Petra)
- Paul Simmons (American football), American football coach

== See also ==
- Paul Simons (disambiguation)
- Paul Symmons (born 1973), Australian rules footballer
