= Linda Thomas-Greenfield =

American diplomat (born 1952)

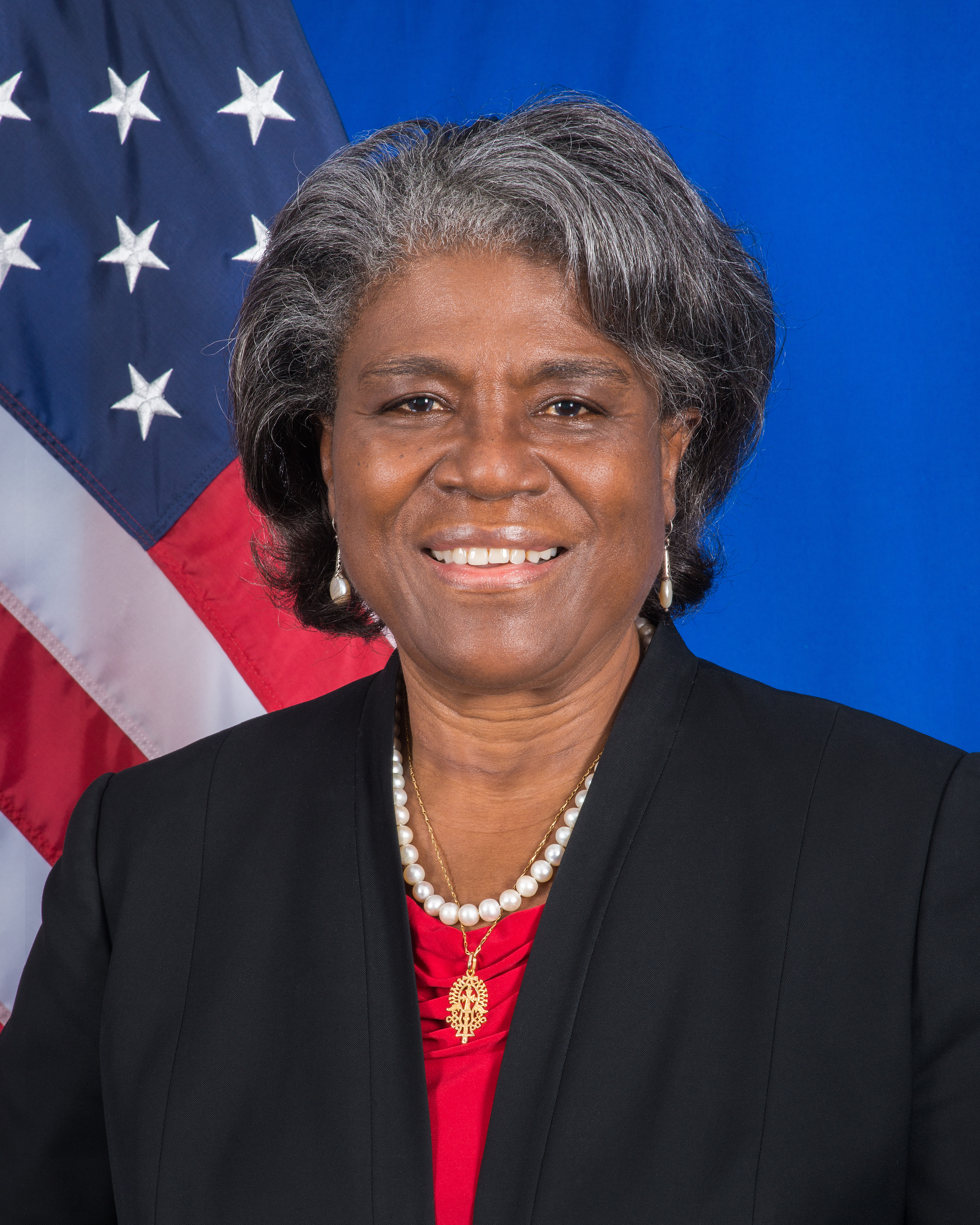
- Official portrait, 2021

31st United States Ambassador to the United Nations
- In office February 25, 2021 – January 20, 2025
- President: Joe Biden
- Deputy: Richard M. Mills Jr. Dorothy Shea
- Preceded by: Kelly Craft
- Succeeded by: Mike Waltz

18th Assistant Secretary of State for African Affairs
- In office August 6, 2013 – March 10, 2017
- President: Barack Obama; Donald Trump
- Deputy: Robert P. Jackson
- Preceded by: Johnnie Carson
- Succeeded by: Tibor P. Nagy

Director General of the Foreign Service Director of Human Resources
- In office April 2, 2012 – August 2, 2013
- President: Barack Obama
- Preceded by: Nancy Jo Powell
- Succeeded by: Arnold A. Chacón

United States Ambassador to Liberia
- In office August 27, 2008 – February 29, 2012
- President: George W. Bush; Barack Obama
- Preceded by: Donald E. Booth
- Succeeded by: Deborah R. Malac

Personal details
- Born: November 22, 1952 (age 73) Baker, Louisiana, U.S.
- Party: Democratic
- Spouse: Lafayette Greenfield
- Children: 2
- Education: Louisiana State University (BA); University of Wisconsin–Madison (MPA)
- Thomas-Greenfield's voice Thomas-Greenfield at a UN Security Council emergency meeting on Ukraine; Recorded February 23, 2022

Linda Thomas-Greenfield (born November 22, 1952) is an American diplomat who served as the 31st United States ambassador to the United Nations under President Joe Biden from 2021 to 2025. She served as the U.S. 18th assistant secretary of state for African affairs from 2013 to 2017. Thomas-Greenfield then worked in the private sector as a senior vice president at business strategy firm Albright Stonebridge Group in Washington, D.C.

President Biden nominated her to be the U.S. ambassador to the United Nations, and she was confirmed by the United States Senate on February 23, 2021. She took office after presenting her credentials on February 25, 2021.

== Early life and education ==
Thomas-Greenfield was born in Baker, Louisiana, in 1952 as one of eight siblings. She graduated from an all-Black high school in Zachary, Louisiana, in 1970. Thomas-Greenfield earned a Bachelor of Arts from Louisiana State University in 1974, and a Master of Public Administration from the University of Wisconsin–Madison in 1975. During UW-Madison's spring 2018 commencement ceremony, Thomas-Greenfield was awarded an honorary doctor of law by Chancellor Rebecca Blank.

== Career ==
Thomas-Greenfield taught political science at Bucknell University, before joining the Foreign Service in 1982.

She served as deputy assistant secretary, Bureau of Population, Refugees and Migration (2004–2006), principal deputy assistant secretary for African affairs (2006–2008), ambassador to Liberia (2008–2012), and director general of the Foreign Service and concurrently as the director of human resources (2012–2013). In addition, Thomas-Greenfield held foreign postings in Switzerland (at the United States Mission to the United Nations), Pakistan, Kenya, The Gambia, Nigeria, and Jamaica.

From 2013 to 2017, she served as the assistant secretary of state for African affairs in the United States Department of State's Bureau of African Affairs.

In 2017, she was terminated by the Trump administration as part of what was a "purge of senior State Department officials and career professionals over nearly four years," according to the Los Angeles Times.

Thomas-Greenfield is a non-resident fellow at Georgetown University, having been the distinguished resident fellow in African studies from fall 2017 to spring 2019.

In November 2020, Thomas-Greenfield was named a volunteer member of President-elect Joe Biden's agency review team to support transition efforts related to the United States Department of State. As of November 2020, Thomas-Greenfield was on leave from a senior vice president position at Albright Stonebridge Group.

=== U.S. ambassador to the United Nations ===
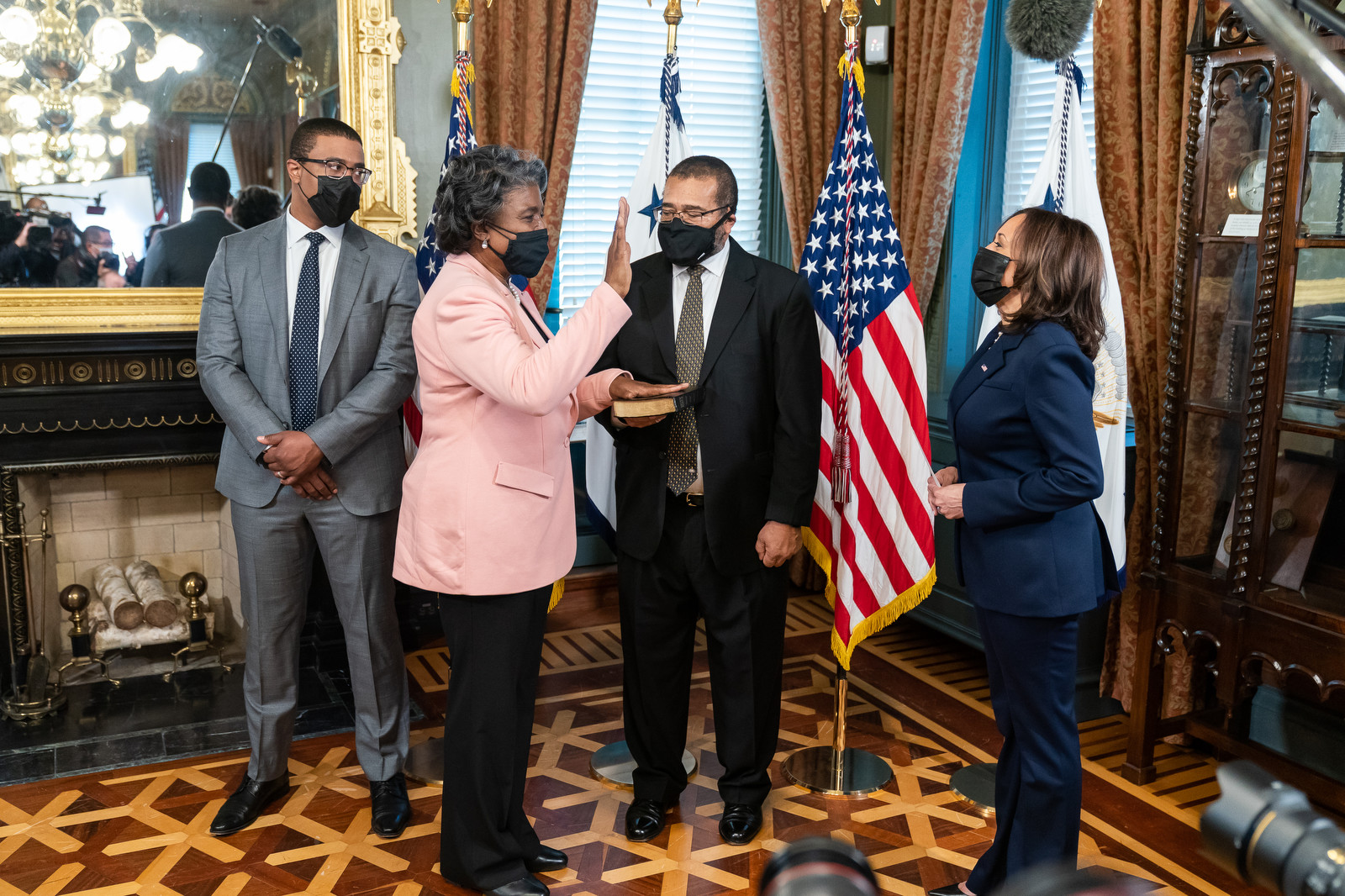
Thomas-Greenfield being sworn in by Vice President Kamala Harris on February 24, 2021

On November 24, 2020, Biden announced his plans to nominate her as the next U.S. ambassador to the United Nations, and to include her in his cabinet and National Security Council. She appeared before the Senate Committee on Foreign Relations on January 27, 2021. During the confirmation hearing on her nomination for U.N. ambassador, Thomas-Greenfield said she regretted giving a speech to a Beijing-backed Confucius Institute in 2019 when she was working for a private consulting firm. She largely agreed with the Senate Foreign Relations Committee on international policies, raising concerns about the People's Republic of China's "malign force" and "debt traps and tactics" in Africa and beyond. In February 2021, it was reported that Senator Ted Cruz of Texas was delaying a committee vote on her nomination due to her 2019 comments on the People's Republic of China. Thomas-Greenfield has vowed to stand "against the unfair targeting of Israel" for Boycott, Divestment, and Sanctions, saying that the movement "verges on antisemitism."

The committee favorably reported her nominations on February 4, 2021. Thomas-Greenfield was confirmed by the United States Senate on February 23, 2021, by a 78–20 vote to be the UN Ambassador; she was subsequently confirmed, by a 78–21 vote, to be the US representative to the General Assembly of the UN. She took office after presenting her credentials on February 25, 2021. She succeeded Ambassador Kelly Craft.

==== Tenure ====
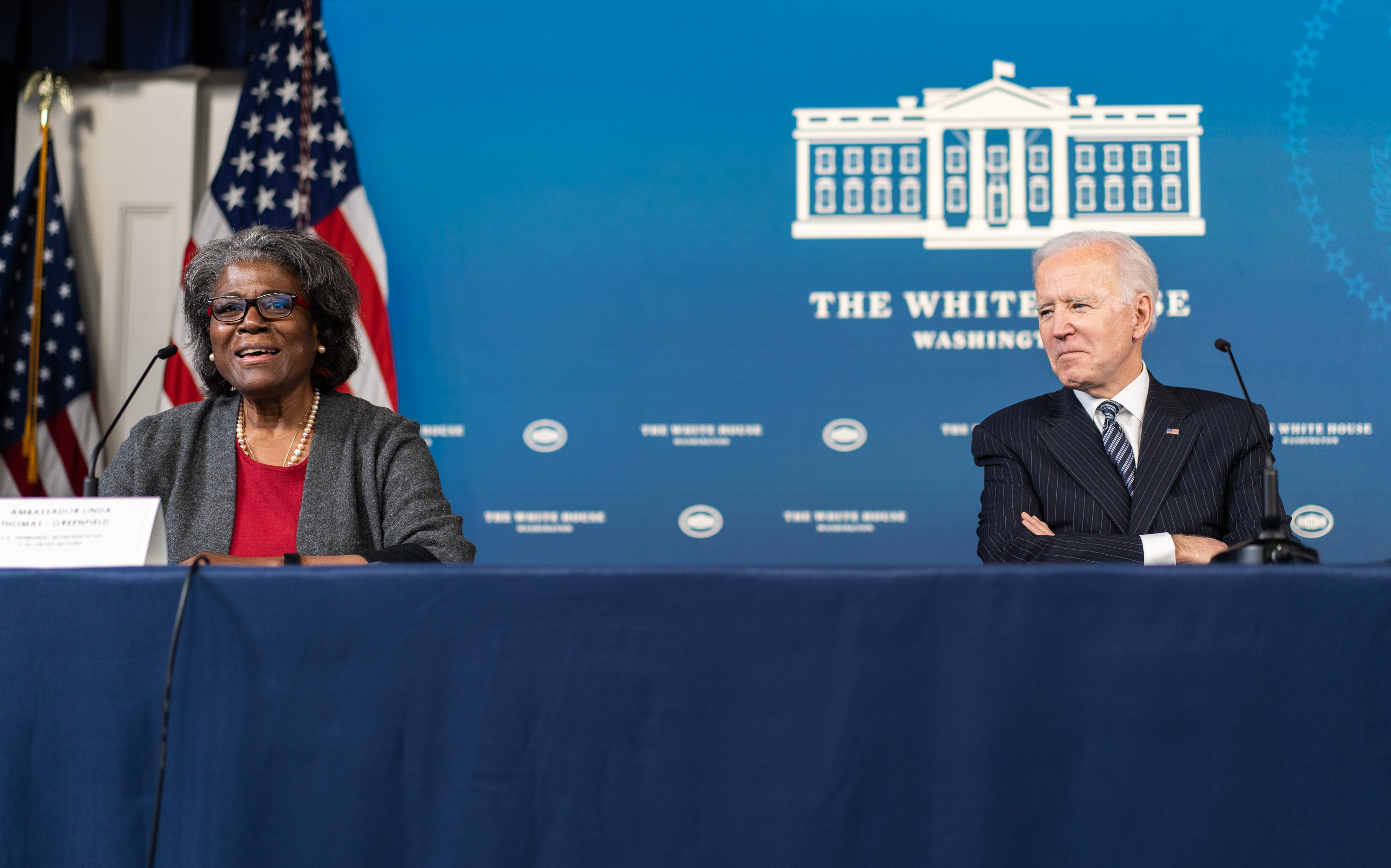
Thomas-Greenfield with President Joe Biden, March 2021

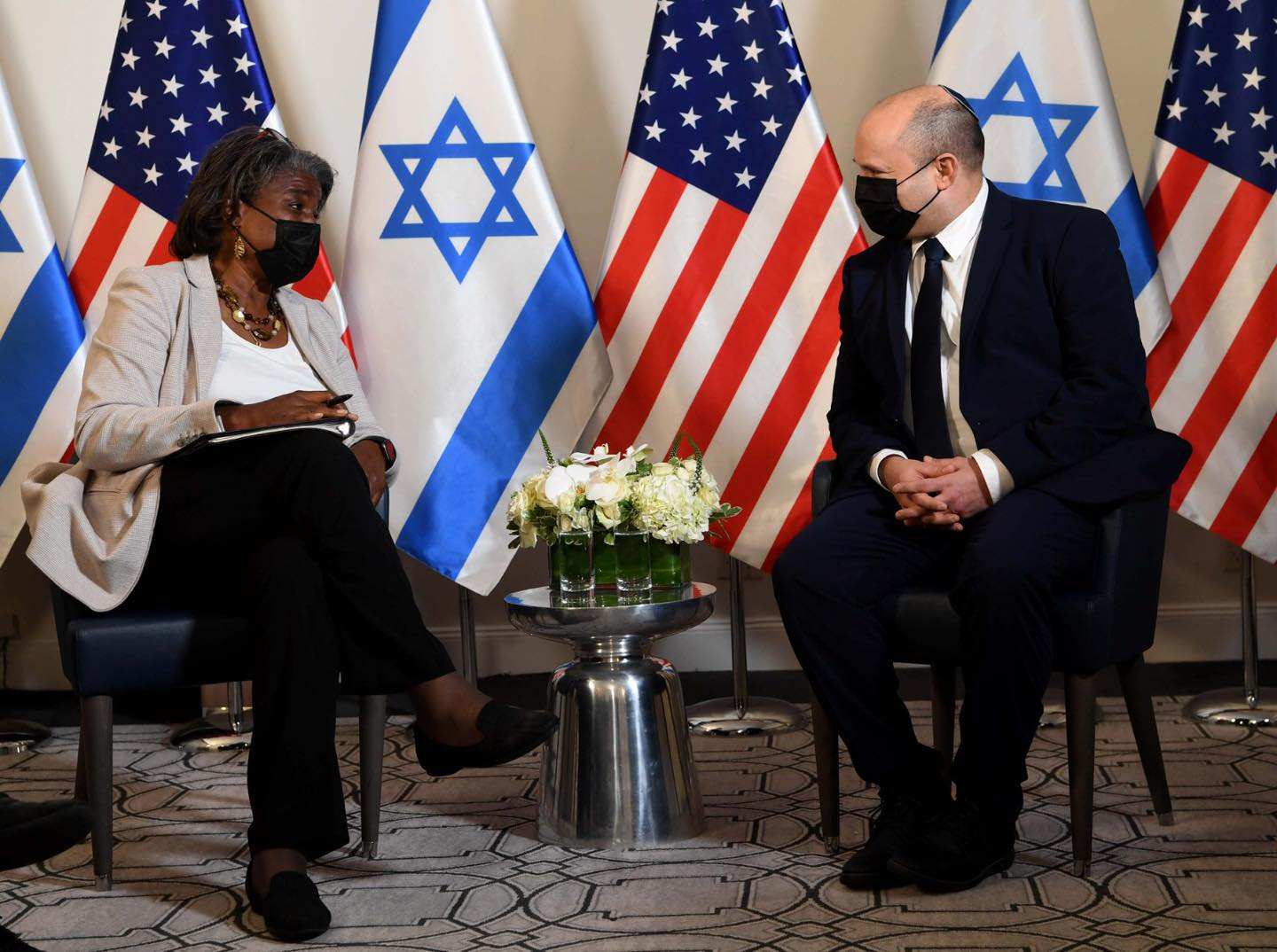
Thomas-Greenfield with Israeli prime minister Naftali Bennett in September 2021

Beginning on March 1, 2021, the United States became president of the United Nations Security Council; thus Greenfield became president of the council as head of the United States delegation. Her term ended on March 31, 2021. Her next term as president of the UNSC began on May 1, 2022, succeeding her UK counterpart, Barbara Woodward, who served as UNSC president for April 2022, in the middle of the continuing Russian invasion of Ukraine, and ended on May 31, 2022, being succeeded by the Albanian ambassador, Ferit Hoxha, for June 2022. Greenfield served another term as UNSC president for August 2023, again succeeding Woodward as she served for July 2023, and a third one for December 2024, again after Woodward served in November 2024.

Thomas-Greenfield accused China of committing genocide against Uyghurs and of detaining more than one million Uyghurs and other ethnic minorities in Xinjiang re-education camps. She said that the United States "will keep standing up and speaking out until China's government stops its crimes against humanity and the genocide of Uyghurs and other minorities in Xinjiang."

She expressed concern over reports of escalating ethnic tensions in Ethiopia's Tigray Region and urged peaceful resolution of the Tigray War between Ethiopia's federal government and the forces of the Tigray regional government.

On October 18, 2023, during the Gaza war, the UN Security Council voted on a resolution to temporarily pause hostilities to allow humanitarian aid to Gaza. The war began with the October 7 attacks, which killed approximately 1,200 Israelis. At the time of the vote, more than 3,000 Palestinians had been killed. Thomas-Greenfield, representing the US, was the sole "no" vote on the 15-member council. The resolution failed as the US has veto power on the UN Security Council. To explain the vote, Thomas-Greenfield said that the US was working on a diplomatic resolution to the humanitarian crisis and that the resolution failed to recognize Israel's right to self defense.

In December 2023, Thomas-Greenfield voted against a humanitarian ceasefire resolution in the 193-member UN General Assembly, where the US does not hold veto power. She said a ceasefire would be "temporary at the best and dangerous at worst." On February 20, 2024, Thomas-Greenfield again cast the lone vote against a UN Security Council resolution calling for an immediate ceasefire in Gaza. She stated: "Demanding an immediate, unconditional ceasefire without an agreement requiring Hamas to release the hostages will not bring about a durable peace. Instead, it could extend the fighting between Hamas and Israel." According to Reuters, the resolution "separately demanded an immediate humanitarian ceasefire and the immediate and unconditional release of all hostages".

Thomas-Greenfield sustained protests, primarily from pro-Palestinian activists opposing the Biden administration's vetoes of Gaza ceasefire resolutions, including a walkout at Columbia University in February 2024, and in May 2024, the University of Vermont and Xavier University of Louisiana both canceled planned commencement addresses by Thomas-Greenfield following student protests over her selection.

== Personal life ==
Thomas-Greenfield's husband, Lafayette Greenfield, worked for the State Department before his retirement. They have two children.

== Publications ==
- Thomas-Greenfield, Linda (July 1, 2001). "US refugee admissions history and policy". Refugee Survey Quarterly. 20 (2): 165–169. doi:10.1093/rsq/20.2.165. JSTOR 45053391.
- Thomas-Greenfield, Linda (November 13, 2013). "Countering the Threat Posed by Boko Haram". U.S. Department of State.
- Thomas-Greenfield, Linda (January 2014). "Countering the Threat Posed by Boko Haram". Hampton Roads International Security Quarterly: 87–91. ProQuest 1473659850.
- Thomas-Greenfield, Linda; Wharton, D. Bruce (2019). "Zimbabwe's Coup: Net Gain or No Gain?". Military Review. Archived from the original on February 5, 2021.
- Thomas-Greenfield, Linda; Burns, William J. (2020). "The Transformation of Diplomacy: How to Save the State Department". Foreign Affairs. 99 (6).

== See also ==
- List of African-American United States Cabinet members
- List of female United States Cabinet members

Diplomatic posts
Preceded by Donald E. Booth	United States Ambassador to Liberia; 2008–2012	Succeeded by Deborah R. Malac
Preceded by Kelly Craft	United States Ambassador to the United Nations; 2021–2025	Succeeded by Mike Waltz
Government offices
Preceded by Nancy Jo Powell	Director General of the Foreign Service; 2012–2013	Succeeded by Arnold A. Chacón
Preceded by Donald Yamamoto; Acting	Assistant Secretary of State for African Affairs; 2013–2017	Succeeded by Donald Yamamoto; Acting
