= Mike Hammer (diplomat) =

American diplomat (born 1963)

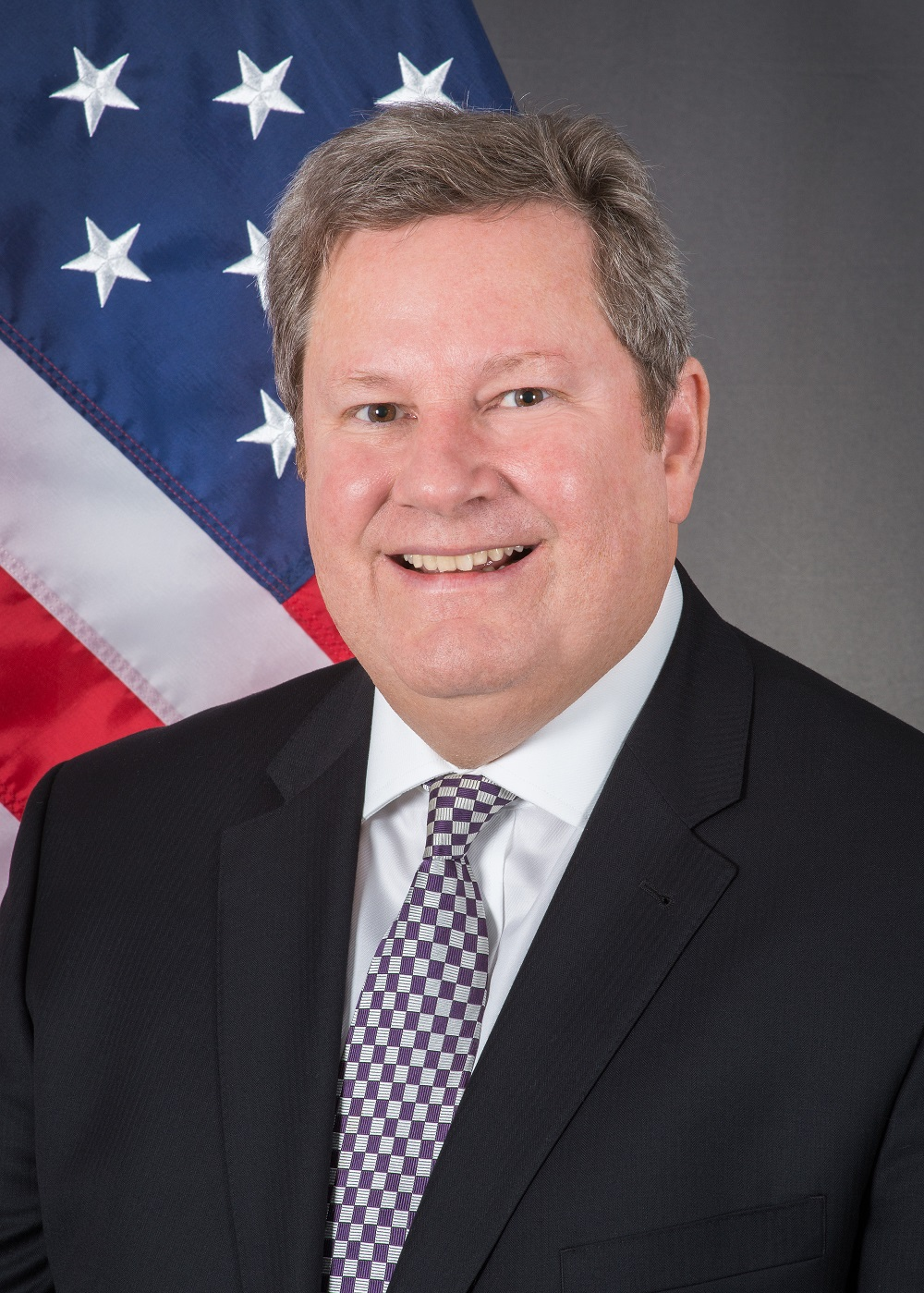
- Official portrait, 2018

United States Special Envoy for the Horn of Africa
- In office June 1, 2022 – November 15, 2024
- President: Joe Biden
- Preceded by: David Satterfield
- Succeeded by: TBD

United States Ambassador to the Democratic Republic of the Congo
- In office December 22, 2018 – June 1, 2022
- President: Donald Trump; Joe Biden
- Preceded by: James Swan
- Succeeded by: Lucy Tamlyn

United States Ambassador to Chile
- In office April 8, 2014 – September 20, 2016
- President: Barack Obama
- Deputy: Dale Eppler
- Preceded by: Alejandro Wolff
- Succeeded by: Carol Perez

27th Assistant Secretary of State for Public Affairs
- In office March 14, 2011 – September 3, 2013; Acting: March 14, 2011 – March 30, 2012
- President: Barack Obama
- Preceded by: Philip Crowley
- Succeeded by: Douglas Frantz

Personal details
- Born: December 26, 1963 (age 62) Washington, D.C., U.S.
- Education: Georgetown University (BS); Tufts University (MA); National Defense University (MA)

Michael A. Hammer (born December 26, 1963) is an American diplomat who has served as a chargé d'affaires to Cuba since 2024 on an ad interim basis. He was previously as the United States special envoy for the Horn of Africa 2022 to 2024. A career member of the United States Foreign Service, Hammer previously served as the United States ambassador to Chile from 2014 to 2016 and the United States ambassador to the Democratic Republic of the Congo from 2018 to 2022.

== Education ==
Born in Washington D.C., Hammer grew up in Latin America, living in Honduras, El Salvador, Colombia, Venezuela, and Brazil. He received a bachelor's degree from Georgetown University's Edmund A. Walsh School of Foreign Service, and master's degrees from The Fletcher School of Law and Diplomacy at Tufts University and the National War College at the National Defense University.

== Career ==
Hammer is a career member of the United States Senior Foreign Service, joining in 1988, and he has served abroad in Bolivia, Norway, Iceland, and Denmark. In Washington, he has served in the State Department's Operations Center and as special assistant to under secretary of state for political affairs Marc Grossman, where Hammer was responsible for Latin American affairs. From 2012 to 2013, Hammer served as assistant secretary of state for public affairs. He served as acting assistant secretary from 2011 to 2012.

Hammer served as special assistant to the president, senior director for press and communications, and spokesman at the National Security Council at the White House from 2009 to 2011. He also previously served at the National Security Council as deputy spokesman (from 1999 to 2000) and Director for Andean Affairs (from 2000 to 2001).

On June 21, 2013, President Barack Obama nominated Hammer to be the United States ambassador to the Republic of Chile. He was confirmed by the United States Senate on March 6, 2014, and sworn in the day after on March 7.

He was nominated to be the next ambassador to the Democratic Republic of the Congo by President Donald Trump on June 20, 2018, and confirmed by the Senate on September 6, 2018. On June 1, 2020, Hammer said he was "deeply disturbed" by the murder of George Floyd, and further stated that "Law enforcement must be held accountable worldwide. No one is above the law".

On June 1, 2022, U.S Secretary of State Antony Blinken announced Mike Hammer as the new special envoy for the Horn of Africa under the Biden Administration, replacing David Satterfield. In late July the same year, Hammer visited Egypt and Ethiopia to build relations and discuss the Grand Ethiopian Renaissance Dam. Throughout 2022, he also worked with Ethiopian and Tigrayan officials to negotiate an end to the Tigray War. On November 2 (with Hammer acting as one of the mediators), a peace treaty was signed between the government of Ethiopia and the Tigray People's Liberation Front (TPLF), formally ending the war on November 3.

In August 28, 2023, Hammer announced he would meet with Kenyan, Ethiopian, African Union and Intergovernmental Authority on Development (IGAD) officials to discuss ways to resolve a conflict in Sudan, which began earlier that year.

== Personal life ==
Hammer is married with three children. He speaks Spanish, French, Portuguese, and Icelandic.

== See also ==
- List of current ambassadors of the United States
- List of ambassadors appointed by Donald Trump

Political offices
Preceded by Philip Crowley	Assistant Secretary of State for Public Affairs; 2011–2013; Acting: 2011–2012	Succeeded by Douglas Frantz
Diplomatic posts
Preceded by Alejandro Wolff	United States Ambassador to Chile; 2014–2016	Succeeded by Carol Perez
Preceded by James C. Swan	United States to the Democratic Republic of the Congo; 2018–2022	Succeeded by Lucy Tamlyn
