= W. Robert Pearson =

American diplomat

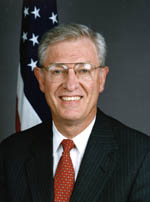
- W. Robert Pearson

United States Ambassador to Turkey
- In office September 21, 2000 – July 23, 2003
- President: Bill Clinton; George W. Bush
- Preceded by: Mark Robert Parris
- Succeeded by: Eric S. Edelman

14th Executive Secretary of the United States Department of State
- In office 1991–1993
- Preceded by: J. Stapleton Roy
- Succeeded by: Marc Isaiah Grossman

25th Director General of the Foreign Service
- In office October 7, 2003 – February 27, 2006
- Preceded by: Ruth A. Davis
- Succeeded by: George McDade Staples

Personal details
- Born: 1943 (age 82–83)
- Education: Vanderbilt University; University of Virginia Law School
- Profession: Diplomat

W. Robert Pearson (born 1943) is a former Foreign Service Officer who served as United States Ambassador to Turkey (2000–2003) and later as Director of Human Resources in the Foreign Service until his retirement in 2006. He became the fourth President of the nonprofit International Research & Exchanges Board (IREX) in November 2008.

== Early life ==
W. Robert Pearson was born in 1943 in Tennessee. He graduated from Vanderbilt University, where he received a bachelor of arts degree, and he received a law degree from the University of Virginia Law School in 1968.

== Career ==
Pearson is a career member of the Senior Foreign Service, Class of Career Minister. He has a broad background in European and security issues as well as wide management experience overseas and in Washington, D.C. He was the United States Ambassador to Turkey based in Ankara from September 21, 2000 through July 2003 and managed U.S. interests in the country through two severe domestic economic crises, a general election, the war in Afghanistan, and the liberation of Iraq. From 2003 to 2006, Ambassador Pearson served as Director General of the U.S. Foreign Service. Early on he was a member of the U.S. Navy Judge Advocate General's Corps from 1969 to 1973. A later posting to Beijing, China saw him serve as a political officer (1981–1983) then as staff assistant in the East Asian and Pacific Affairs Bureau. He began his Foreign Service career with a 2-year assignment in Auckland, New Zealand.

Deputy Chief of Mission of the U.S. Embassy to France from July 1997 to July 2000, Pearson closely followed the evolution of the European Union, defense and security issues within the Atlantic Alliance and the EU. He actively promoted business ties between France and the U.S. and helped in the opening of five new American offices in France's regions. Pearson was appointed Deputy Executive Secretary of the National Security Council from 1985 until 1987.

Pearson served twice at NATO, from 1993 to 1997 as Deputy Permanent Representative to the U.S. Mission during the Balkan crisis and NATO's enlargement, and from 1987 to 1990 on the international staff as chair of NATO's Political Committee. Between 1991 and 1993, Pearson was also Executive Secretary of the Department of State.

Pearson is a member of the International Institute for Strategic Studies and the American Academy of Diplomacy. He speaks French, Chinese and Turkish.

Diplomatic posts
Preceded by Mark Robert Parris	United States Ambassador to Turkey; 2000–2003	Succeeded by Eric S. Edelman
