= Arnold A. Chacón =

American diplomat (born 1956)

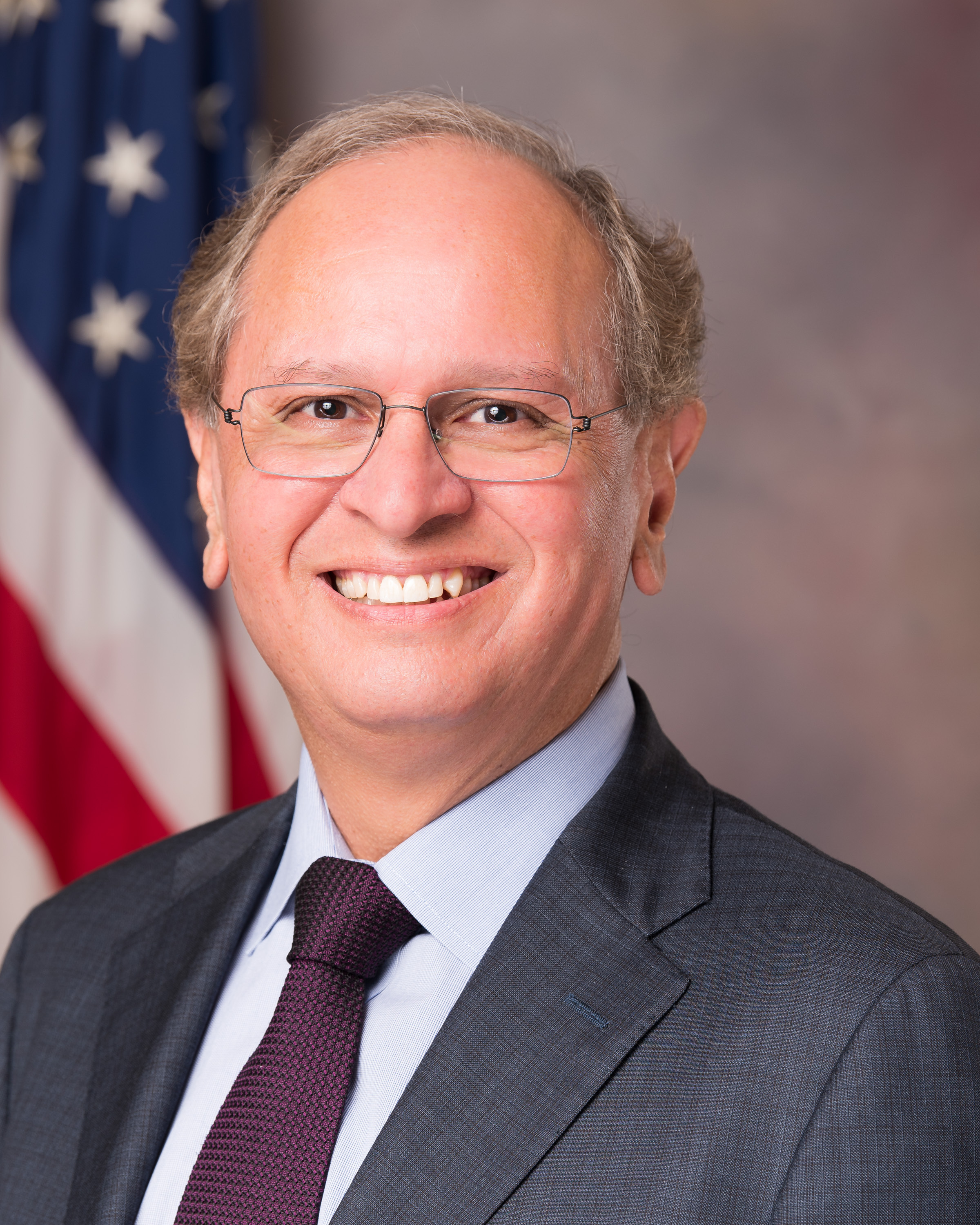

United States Ambassador to Canada
- Chargé d'Affaires
- In office May 28, 2021 – December 7, 2021
- President: Joe Biden
- Preceded by: Katherine Brucker (acting)
- Succeeded by: David L. Cohen

30th Director General of the Foreign Service
- In office December 22, 2014 – June 2, 2017
- President: Barack Obama; Donald Trump
- Preceded by: Linda Thomas-Greenfield
- Succeeded by: Carol Perez

United States Ambassador to Guatemala
- In office August 29, 2011 – March 5, 2014
- President: Barack Obama
- Preceded by: Stephen McFarland
- Succeeded by: Todd Robinson

Personal details
- Born: 1956 (age 69–70)
- Spouse: Alida Chacon
- Education: University of Colorado, Boulder

Arnold A. Chacón (born 1956) is an American career diplomat who served as acting United States Ambassador to Canada in 2021. He has served as Senior Vice President of the National Defense University since August 2018.

== Personal life and education ==
Ambassador Chacón grew up in Denver and received a bachelor's degree in international affairs from the University of Colorado in Boulder, Colorado where he attended on a full-ride academic scholarship granted by the Boettcher Foundation. His wife of 30 years, Alida Chacón, is also a member of the U.S. Foreign Service. They have three children.

== Career ==
A career U.S. Foreign Service officer, he has served in a number of leadership positions in Latin America and Europe, including Deputy Chief of Mission in Madrid, Spain. He has led initiatives to promote free and fair elections, advance respect for human rights, and support the rule of law. While ambassador, Chacón also directed crisis management operations, worked with international partners to combat human trafficking, and advanced regional free trade agreements.

Chacón served as State Department Deputy Executive Director in Washington, D.C., and at the United States Mission to the United Nations. He was a Fellow at the American Political Science Association, and is the recipient of the State Department's Presidential Rank Award and other leadership honors. He speaks Spanish and Italian.

He was the United States Ambassador to Guatemala from August 29, 2011, to March 5, 2014. He was subsequently the Director General of the Foreign Service and Director of Human Resources at the Department of State. He was then detailed from the Department of State to the National Defense University as Senior Vice President.

On May 28, 2021, it was announced that Chacón had been designated as Chargé d’Affaires ad interim at the U.S. Embassy in Ottawa.

Diplomatic posts
Preceded by Stephen McFarland	United States Ambassador to Guatemala; 2011–2014	Succeeded by Todd Robinson
Preceded by Linda Thomas-Greenfield	Director General of the Foreign Service; 2014–2017	Succeeded by Carol Perez
