= Douglas Frantz =

American journalist (born 1949)

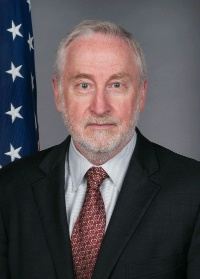
- Official portrait, 2013

28th Assistant Secretary of State for Public Affairs
- In office September 3, 2013 – October 1, 2015
- President: Barack Obama
- Deputy: Valerie Fowler
- Preceded by: Michael Hammer
- Succeeded by: John Kirby

Personal details
- Born: September 29, 1949 (age 77) North Manchester, Indiana, U.S.
- Spouse: Catherine Collins
- Education: DePauw University; Columbia University

Douglas Frantz (born September 29, 1949) is an American Pulitzer Prize-winning former investigative journalist and author, and served as the Deputy Secretary-General of the Organisation for Economic Co-operation and Development from 2015 to 2017.

He resigned as Los Angeles Times Managing Editor in 2007 after blocking the publication of an article about the Armenian genocide; Frantz said his resignation was not related to the ensuing controversy.

== Career ==
Frantz graduated from DePauw University in 1971 and earned a M.S. from the Columbia University Graduate School of Journalism. He was an investigative reporter for the Los Angeles Times, the Chicago Tribune, and The New York Times.

Frantz served as the Istanbul bureau chief for The New York Times, and the managing editor of the Los Angeles Times from 2005 to 2007. Frantz was chief investigator for the Senate Foreign Relations Committee. He is also the former Managing Director of Kroll's Business Intelligence Washington office.

From 2013 to 2015, Frantz served as the State Department's Assistant Secretary of State for Public Affairs.

=== Armenian genocide controversy ===
As the Los Angeles Times Managing Editor, Frantz blocked a story on the Armenian genocide in April 2007 written by Mark Arax, a veteran Times journalist of Armenian descent. Frantz argued that Arax previously had expressed an opinion on the topic and therefore was biased on the subject, apparently referring to a letter co-signed by Arax that endorsed the LA Times policy of referring to the event as "Armenian Genocide". Arax, who has published similar articles before, lodged a discrimination complaint and threatened a federal lawsuit. Frantz was accused of having a bias obtained while being stationed in Istanbul, Turkey. Frantz resigned from the paper on July 6.

=== Personal ===
Frantz has written 10 nonfiction books, six of them with his wife, Catherine Collins. Their most recent book, Salmon Wars is about the environmental and health dangers of the salmon fishing industry. They live in a fishing village in Nova Scotia.

== Awards ==
- 1993; 1998 Pulitzer Prize for National Reporting finalist
- 1993 Goldsmith Prize for Investigative Reporting

== Works ==
- John C. Boland, Douglas Frantz (1985). Wall Street's Insiders: How You Can Profit With The Smart Money. William Morrow & Co. ISBN 978-0-688-03872-4.
- Douglas Frantz (1987). Levine & Co.: Wall Street's Insider Trading Scandal. Henry Holt & Co. ISBN 978-0-8050-0457-1.
- Douglas Frantz (1991). Making It : The Business of Building in the Age of Money. Holt. ISBN 978-0-8050-0996-5.
- Douglas Frantz, Catherine Collins (1990). Selling Out : How We Are Letting Japan Buy Our Land, Our Industries, Our Financial Institutions, and Our Future. McGraw-Hill. ISBN 978-0-8092-4152-1.
- Catherine Collins, Douglas Frantz (1993). Teachers : Talking Out of School. Little, Brown and Company. ISBN 978-0-316-29266-5.
- Douglas Frantz (1993). From the Ground Up: The Business of Building in the Age of Money. University of California Press. ISBN 978-0-520-08399-8.
- Douglas Frantz, David McKean (1995). Friends in High Places: The Rise and Fall of Clark Clifford. Little, Brown and Company. ISBN 978-0-316-29162-0.
- Douglas Frantz; Catherine Collins (2000). Celebration, U.S.A.: living in Disney's brave new town. Macmillan. ISBN 978-0-8050-5561-0.
- Douglas Frantz; Catherine Collins (2003). Death on the Black Sea. Ecco. ISBN 978-0-06-621262-3.
- Douglas Frantz; Catherine Collins (2007). The Nuclear Jihadist. Grand Central Publishing. ISBN 978-0-446-50560-4.
- Douglas Frantz, Catherine Collins (2008). The Man from Pakistan: The True Story of the World's Most Dangerous Nuclear Smuggler. Twelve. ISBN 978-0-446-19958-2.
- Douglas Frantz; Catherine Collins (2011). Fallout: The True Story of the CIA's Secret War on Nuclear Trafficking. Simon and Schuster. ISBN 978-1-4391-8306-9.

Political offices
Preceded by Michael Hammer	Assistant Secretary of State for Public Affairs; 2013–2015	Succeeded by John Kirby
