= Director General of the Foreign Service =

U.S. government position

Director General of the United States Foreign Service
- Seal of the U.S. Department of State

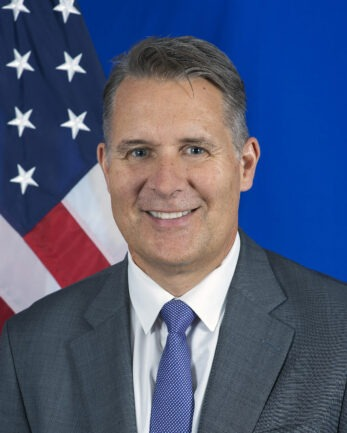
- Incumbent; Thomas E. Lersten (Senior Bureau Official) since September 23, 2026
- United States Department of State
- Reports to: Secretary of State; Under Secretary of State for Management
- Seat: Harry S Truman Building, Washington, D.C.
- Appointer: The president; with the advice and consent of the Senate
- Term length: No fixed term
- Constituting instrument: 22 U.S.C. § 3928 (Foreign Service Act of 1980)
- Inaugural holder: Selden Chapin
- Formation: 1946
- Website: Official Website

The director general of the Foreign Service is the designated manager of the United States Foreign Service.

The director general is a current or former Foreign Service officer, appointed by the president, with the advice and consent of the United States Senate. Since November 23, 1975, under a departmental administrative action, the director general has concurrently held the title of Director of the Bureau of Global Talent Management. As the head of the human resources bureau, the director general holds a rank equivalent to an assistant secretary of state and reports to the under secretary of state for management.

== History ==
Congress created the position of Director General of the Foreign Service through the Foreign Service Act of 1946. Between 1946 and 1980, the secretary of state designated the director general.

The Foreign Service Act of 1980 made the position a presidential appointee.

After 1986, the director general became responsible for all personnel aspects of the Foreign Service and the civil service at the State Department, including advertising, examination, appointment, job assignments worldwide, disciplinary actions, and promotions to the Senior Foreign Service.

== List of directors general of the Foreign Service ==
#	Director General	Tenure	President
1	Selden Chapin	November 13, 1946 – April 30, 1947	Harry S. Truman
2	Christian M. Ravndal	May 1, 1947 – June 23, 1949	Harry S. Truman
3	Richard Porter Butrick	September 7, 1949 – April 1, 1952	Harry S. Truman
4	Gerald Augustin Drew	March 30, 1952 – October 18, 1954	Harry S. Truman, Dwight D. Eisenhower
5	Raymond A. Hare	October 19, 1954 – August 29, 1956	Dwight D. Eisenhower
6	Joseph Charles Satterthwaite	May 6, 1957 – September 1, 1958	Dwight D. Eisenhower
7	Waldemar John Gallman	November 17, 1958 – January 31, 1961	Dwight D. Eisenhower
8	Tyler Thompson	May 14, 1961 – February 15, 1964	John F. Kennedy, Lyndon B. Johnson
9	Joseph Palmer II	February 16, 1964 – April 10, 1966	Lyndon B. Johnson
10	John Milton Steeves	August 1, 1966 – July 31, 1969	Lyndon B. Johnson
11	John Howard Burns	August 1, 1969 – June 15, 1971	Richard Nixon
12	William O. Hall	July 5, 1971 – September 30, 1973	Richard Nixon
13	Nathaniel Davis	November 13, 1973 – March 17, 1975	Richard Nixon, Gerald Ford
14	Carol Laise	April 11, 1975 – December 26, 1977	Gerald Ford
15	Harry G. Barnes, Jr.	December 22, 1977 – February 8, 1981	Jimmy Carter
16	Joan Margaret Clark	July 27, 1981 – October 24, 1983	Ronald Reagan
17	Alfred Atherton	December 2, 1983 – December 28, 1984	Ronald Reagan
18	George Southall Vest	June 8, 1985 – May 3, 1989	Ronald Reagan
19	Edward Joseph Perkins	September 22, 1989 – May 7, 1992	George H. W. Bush
20	Genta Hawkins Holmes	September 7, 1992 – August 18, 1995	George H. W. Bush, Bill Clinton
21	Anthony Cecil Eden Quainton	December 29, 1995 – August 22, 1997	Bill Clinton
22	Edward William Gnehm	August 25, 1997 – June 14, 2000	Bill Clinton
23	Marc Isaiah Grossman	June 19, 2000 – March 26, 2001	Bill Clinton
24	Ruth A. Davis	June 15, 2001 – June 30, 2003	George W. Bush
25	W. Robert Pearson	October 7, 2003 – February 27, 2006	George W. Bush
26	George McDade Staples	May 25, 2006 – June 27, 2007	George W. Bush
27	Harry K. Thomas, Jr.	September 21, 2007 – June 24, 2009	George W. Bush, Barack Obama
28	Nancy Jo Powell	August 3, 2009 – January 6, 2012	Barack Obama
29	Linda Thomas-Greenfield	April 2, 2012 – August 2, 2013	Barack Obama
30	Arnold A. Chacón	December 22, 2014 – June 2, 2017	Barack Obama, Donald Trump
-	William E. Todd (Acting)	June 12, 2017 – February 1, 2019	Donald Trump
31	Carol Z. Perez	February 1, 2019 – June 6, 2022	Donald Trump, Joe Biden
32	Marcia Bernicat	June 6, 2022 – January 20, 2025	Joe Biden
-	Catherine Rodriguez (Acting)	January 20, 2025 – April 4, 2025	Donald Trump
-	Lew Olowski (Senior Bureau Official)	April 7, 2025 – December 23, 2025	Donald Trump
-	Sarah McKemey (Senior Bureau Official)	December 23, 2025 – September 23, 2026	Donald Trump
-	Thomas E. Lersten (Senior Bureau Official)	September 23, 2026 – Present	Donald Trump
