= Bureau of Global Talent Management =

Agency in the United States Department of State

- Seal of the United States Department of State

Bureau overview
- Jurisdiction: Executive branch of the United States
- Bureau executive: Sarah McKemey, senior official fulfilling the duties of director general of the Foreign Service
- Parent department: U.S. Department of State
- Website: state.gov/gtm

The Bureau of Global Talent Management (GTM), previously Bureau of Human Resources, is an agency in the United States Department of State. The bureau is under the purview of the under secretary of state for management. The bureau handles recruitment, assignment evaluation, promotion, discipline, career development, and retirement policies and programs for the State Department's Foreign Service and Civil Service employees. The bureau also administers the Foreign Service written examination and oral assessment, publishes State Magazine, and coordinates the State Department's Student Internship Program, Virtual Student Federal Service (VSFS), and Pathways internships.

== See also ==
- Foreign Service Officer
- Rogers Act
- United States Foreign Service
