= Paul E. Simons =

American diplomat

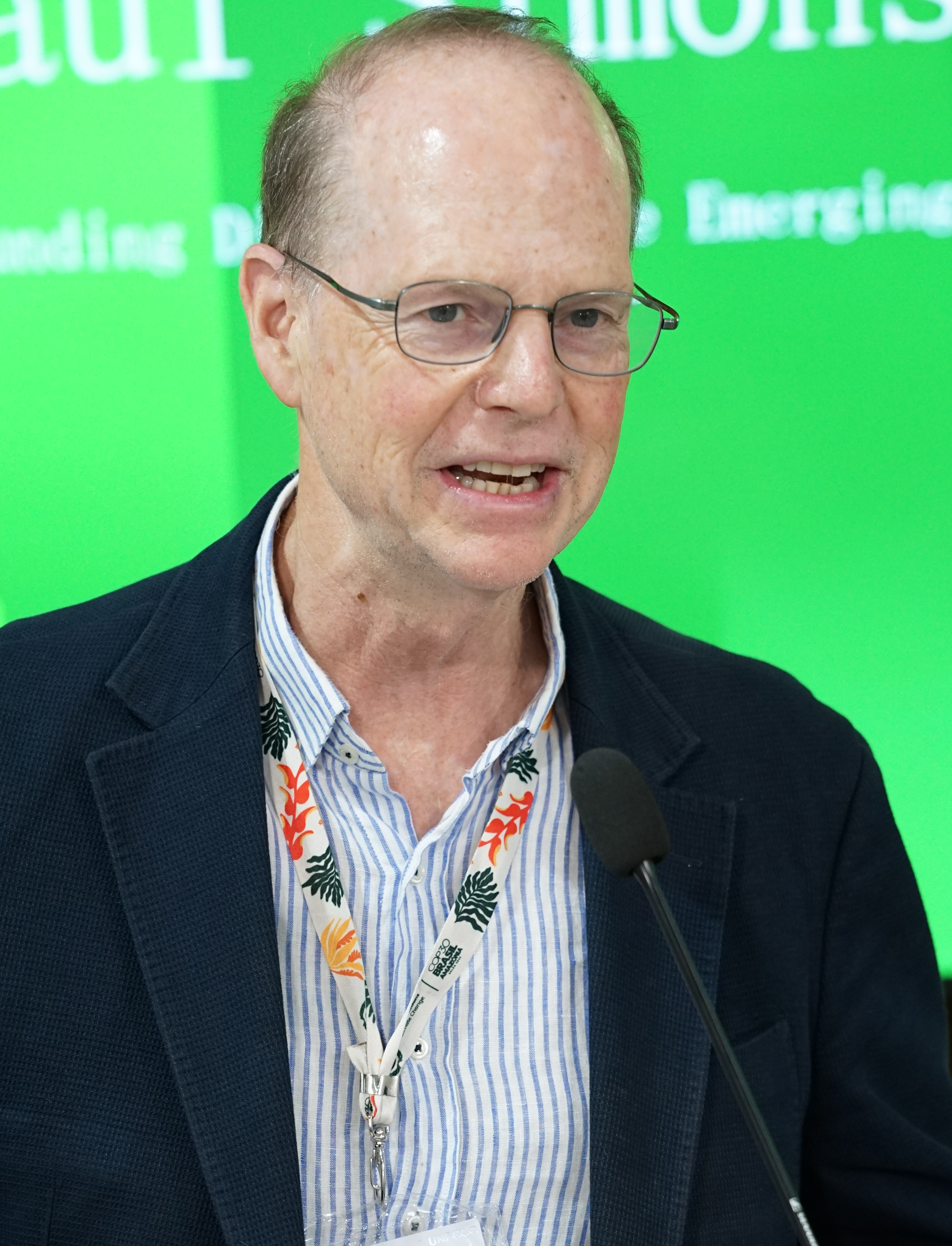
- Simons at COP30 in 2025

United States Ambassador to Chile
- In office November 7, 2007 – July 5, 2010
- President: George W. Bush; Barack Obama

Personal details
- Education: Yale University

Paul E. Simons is a career diplomat who served as the Ambassador Extraordinary and Plenipotentiary of the United States to Chile from 2007 to 2010.

Previously, he held a number of senior positions in the Department of State, including Deputy Assistant Secretary for Energy and Sanctions (2003-2007), and Acting Assistant Secretary for International Narcotics and Law Enforcement Affairs (2002-2003). For much of the prior decade, he worked on Middle East peace negotiations, supporting the multilateral track of the Arab Israeli peace process and serving as Deputy Chief of Mission at the U.S. Embassy in Tel Aviv.

In 2011, Ambassador Simons was named a Senior Fellow at the Jackson Institute for Global Affairs at Yale University.

Upon retiring from the State Department, Ambassador Simons continued an active career in multilateral diplomacy. From 2011 to 2015, he served as Executive Secretary of the Interamerican Drug Abuse Control Commission at the Organization of American States. In April 2015, Simons was selected as the new deputy executive director of the International Energy Agency (IEA). He assumed office in July 2015.

In August 2020, Ambassador Simons returned to Yale University as a Senior Fellow at the Jackson Institute for Global Affairs. He participated in the COP 26, 27 and 28 climate change meetings as a representative of Yale University, where he teaches and mentors students on global clean energy and climate change policies.

Ambassador Simons is the Founding Director of the Yale Emerging Climate Leaders Fellowship, which brings together 16 top global climate leaders from across the Global South each year to broaden their technical skills, deepen their professional networks, and exchange views with top global clean energy and climate change leaders.
