= Andrew J. Shapiro =

American attorney and diplomat

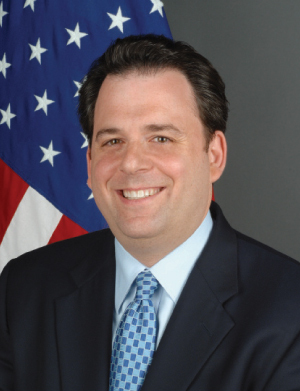

17th Assistant Secretary of State for Political-Military Affairs
- In office June 22, 2009 – April 19, 2013
- President: Barack Obama
- Preceded by: Mark Kimmitt
- Succeeded by: Puneet Talwar

Personal details
- Born: 1967 (age 58–59)
- Education: University of Pennsylvania (BA); Columbia University (JD)

Andrew J. Shapiro (born 1967) is an American attorney and diplomat who served as the 17th Assistant Secretary of State for Political-Military Affairs from 2009 to 2013. Shapiro is currently a managing director at Beacon Global Strategies LLC, which he founded with partners Jeremy Bash and Philippe Reines in 2013.

== Education ==
Shapiro received a B.A. in diplomatic history from the University of Pennsylvania and a Master of International Affairs and Juris Doctor degrees from the School of International and Public Affairs, Columbia University, and Columbia Law School, where he was a Harlan Fiske Stone Scholar.

== Biography ==
From 2009 to 2013, Shapiro served as the Assistant Secretary of State for Political-Military Affairs, during which time he revitalized and deepened political-military partnerships at home and abroad, and promoted record-setting foreign military sales, creating thousands of jobs in the United States while contributing to the security of key U.S. partners. As the longest-serving Senate-confirmed Assistant Secretary, Shapiro managed U.S. security relationships with partners in the Middle East.

While leading the Bureau of Political-Military Affairs, Shapiro undertook the first major reform of export control efforts in twenty years. During his tenure, he announced the largest U.S. government foreign military sales package in history and presided over the processing of a record number of United States Munitions List export licenses. He also managed more than $6 billion in security assistance funds and drove the development of the innovative Global Security Contingency Fund.

Before being confirmed as Assistant Secretary, Shapiro served as a senior advisor to then-Secretary of State, Hillary Clinton. Prior to joining the State Department, he served as Senator Clinton's Senior Defense and Foreign Policy Advisor from 2001 to 2009.

He also served as a member of the Obama-Biden Department of Defense Agency Review Transition Team before shifting to Secretary of State Clinton's confirmation and transition team once she was officially named. During the 2000 presidential election campaign, Shapiro served on the Gore-Lieberman campaign as the Briefing Book Director for vice presidential candidate Joe Lieberman. He served as an attorney with the Gore-Lieberman Recount Committee during the recount in Florida.

Previously, Shapiro was counsel to the Justice Department's International Competition Policy Advisory Committee, and was an associate at the Washington, D.C. law firm Covington & Burling.

Shapiro is the recipient of the Distinguished Honor Award, Gold Star Wives of America Appreciation Award, and the National Guard Association's Patrick Henry Award. He is a member of the Council on Foreign Relations and the International Institute for Strategic Studies.

Government offices
Preceded by Mark Kimmitt	Assistant Secretary of State for Political-Military Affairs; June 22, 2009 – April 19, 2013	Succeeded by Thomas P. Kelly III
