= Nikolai Ogarkov =

Marshal of the Soviet Union

Marshal of the Soviet Union Nikolai Ogarkov
- Николай Васильевич Огарков
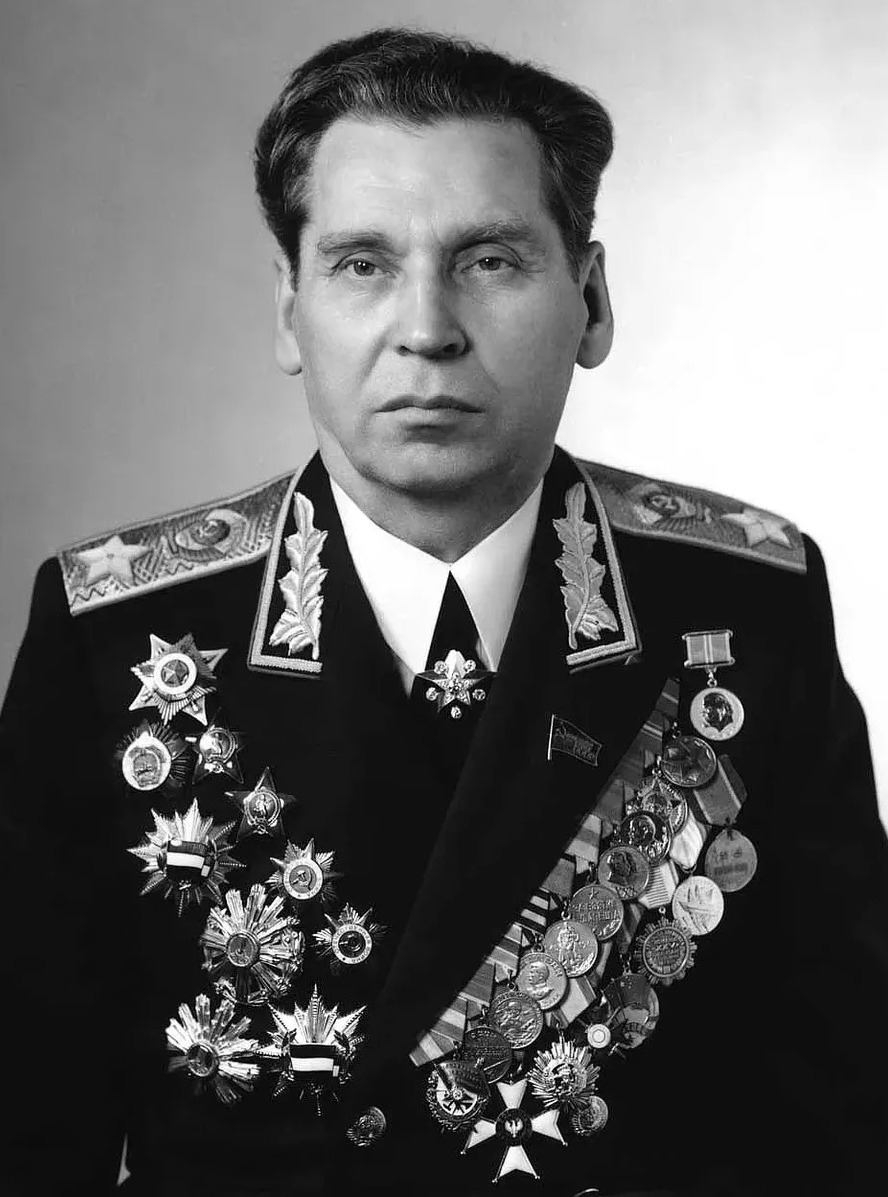
- Official portrait, 1977
- Born: 30 October 1917; Molokovo, Bezhetsky Uyezd, Tver Governorate, Russian Republic
- Died: 23 January 1994 (aged 76); Moscow, Russia
- Military career
- Allegiance: Soviet Union; Russia
- Branch: Soviet Armed Forces; Russian Armed Forces
- Service years: 1937–1994
- Rank: Marshal of the Soviet Union (1977-1991)
- Nicknames: "Formidable soldier" «грозный солдат»
- Commands: Western theater of war command Soviet General Staff; Volga Military District; 20th Guards Motor Rifle Division
- Awards: Hero of the Soviet Union

Nikolai Vasilyevich Ogarkov (Russian: Николай Васильевич Огарков; 30 October 1917 – 23 January 1994) was a prominent Soviet military personality. He was promoted to Marshal of the Soviet Union in 1977. Between 1977 and 1984, he was Chief of the General Staff of the USSR. He became widely known in the West when he became the Soviet military's spokesman following the shootdown of Korean Air Lines Flight 007 near Moneron Island in September 1983. He was dismissed as Chief of the General Staff on 6 September 1984.

== Early life ==
Ogarkov was born on 30 October 1917 in the village of Molokovo, Tver Governorate, to a peasant family. In 1931, he moved to the Soviet Far East, where his elder brother completed his military service. From the age of 14, Ogarkov began on his own work as a seller's apprentice at a closed military cooperative.

In April 1933, he returned to his hometown, where for 1.5 years he worked as an accountant, secretary of the district council of trade unions, etc. In 1934 he left for the Moscow region, to study at the working faculty of the energy industry in the village of Kudinovo, after which he studied at the V.V.Kuibyshev Moscow Civil Engineering Institute. After school he worked as an accountant and secretary of the district council of trade unions.

== Military career ==
Ogarkov joined the Red Army in 1938 and graduated from the Astrakhan Rifle and Machinegun School. In 1941, he graduated from the Military Engineering Academy named after Kuibyshev and was awarded the rank of Military Engineer of the 3rd Rank.

=== World War II ===
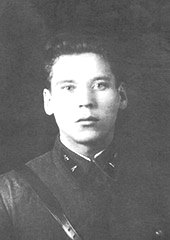
Ogarkov in the Red Army (1940s)

Following the start of Operation Barbarossa in 1941, Ogarkov was stationed at the construction of a fortified area near the Łomża region as a regimental engineer within the 1st Infantry Regiment of the 17th Infantry Division of Western Front.

From October 1941 to February 1942, he served as a Senior Fortification Engineer of the 2nd Department in the engineering department of the Karelian Front and from February 1942, he served as a Regimental Engineer of a Rifle Regiment in the 289th Rifle Division.

In June 1942, Ogarkov served as a Brigade Engineer of the 61st Naval Rifle Brigades and from December 1942, he served as an assistant to the chief of staff of the Engineering Troops of the 32nd Army. In August 1943, he served as assistant to the chief of the Operational Department of the Headquarters of the Engineering Troops of the Karelian Front. From May 1944, he was appointed as Division Engineer of the 122nd Rifle Division in Karelsky. In November 1943, Ogarkov was assigned to the 2nd Ukrainian and 3rd Ukrainian Fronts. During World War II, he participated in the defense of Karelia, and Vyborg-Petrozavodsk, Petsamo-Kirkenes, Budapest and Vienna offensives. In October 1944, he was awarded the Order of the Patriotic War, 2nd degree.

On April 11, 1945, during a battle, while leading sapper units, Ogarkov was wounded and met the end of the war in the hospital. In July, he returned to his division, but three months later, in connection with its disbandment, Lieutenant Colonel Ogarkov was appointed assistant chief of staff of the Engineering Troops of the 27th Army of the Carpathian Military District. On the same year, he joined the Communist Party of Soviet Union.

=== Post war ===
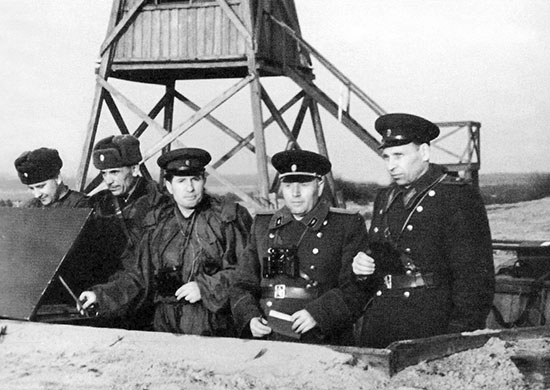
Ogarkov (right) along with other Soviet officers of the Group of Soviet Forces in Germany (1961)

In 1947, he finished studying again at the Kuibyshev Military Academy for Engineer Troops and in 1959 the military academy of the General Staff. From 1945 to 1946 Ogarkov was assistant and senior assistant to the chief of staff of the Engineering Troops of the Carpathian Military District. From 1947 to 1948, he served as deputy head of the Engineering Directorate of the staff of the Commander-in-Chief of the Primorsky Military District. There, after an excellent performance of a number of assignments, he attracted the attention of the commander of the district Rodion Malinovsky, who contributed to his successful career growth.

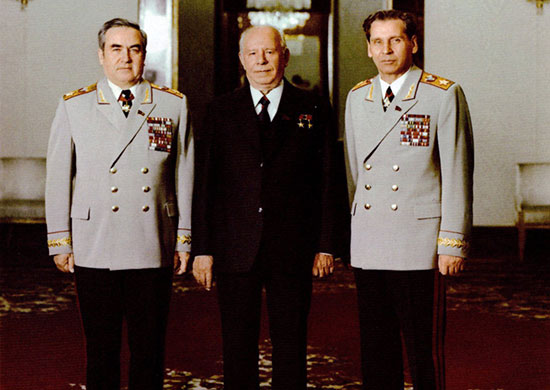
Ogarkov (right) and Viktor Kulikov (left), following presentation of their Marshal's star (1977)

In September 1948, he was appointed senior officer of the department, and in January 1949, chief of a department of a directorate of the staff of the Commander-in-Chief of the Far East. From 1949 to 1953 he was then head of the operational management department and on September 4, 1950, he was promoted to colonel. From 1953 he was deputy chief and finally from 1955, head of this leadership and deputy chief of staff of the Far Eastern Military District. On July 11, 1957, he was appointed major general. On the same year, he was sent to study at the Military Academy of the General Staff of the Armed Forces of the USSR. After graduating from the academy in 1959, Ogarkov commanded the 20th Guards Motor Rifle Division of the Group of Soviet Forces in Germany, at the East German city of Grimma from 1959 to 1961. In December 1961, he was appointed chief of staff and deputy commander of the Belarusian Military District.

In December 1965, he was appointed as commander of the Volga Military District and in April 1968, he was appointed as first Deputy Chief of the General Staff of the Armed Forces of the USSR. Ogarkov was the candidate member of the CPSU Central Committee from 1966 to 1971 and member of the CPSU Central Committee from 1971 to 1991. He served as deputy of the Council of Nationalities of the Supreme Soviet of the USSR from 7th to 11th convocations from 1966 to 1989, from the Lithuanian SSR. From March 1974 to January 1977, Ogarkov was the Deputy Minister of Defense of the USSR, chairman of the State Technical Commission of the USSR and member of the Collegium of the Ministry of Defense of the USSR.

On January 8, 1977, General Ogarkov was appointed Chief of the General Staff of the Armed Forces of the USSR and first Deputy Minister of Defense of the USSR. On January 14, 1977, he was awarded the title of Marshal of the Soviet Union. In the 1970s, he played an important role in the preparation of Strategic Arms Limitation Talks, in the development of formulas acceptable to both sides.

Ogarkov was known as an active opponent of the Soviet invasion of Afghanistan in 1979, for which he had heated disputes with a member of the Politburo of the Central Committee of the CPSU and Minister of Defence Dmitry Ustinov. As chief of the General Staff of the USSR Armed Forces, Ogarkov was not afraid to argue with Ustinov on a number of other issues such as military and weapons development.

On 1 September 1983, while en route from New York City to Seoul, South Korea with stopover in Anchorage, Alaska, Korean Air Lines Flight 007, a Boeing 747-230B carrying 246 passengers and 23 crew was shot down over Moneron Island by the Soviet Air Force, after the airliner deviated from its original planned route and flew through Soviet prohibited airspace, killing all on board. Ogarkov appeared on television and in the news conference as Soviet military's spokesman on the incident, where he defended shooting down of the airliner and said the decision to shoot down the plane was "not an accident or an error" and had been made by a local commander, after it was assumed that the airliner was a reconnaissance aircraft on a spying mission.

=== The revolution in military affairs ===
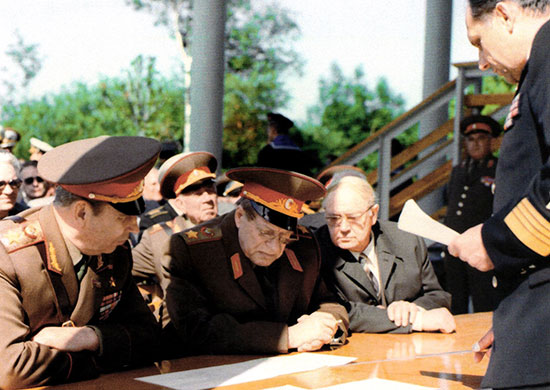
Ogarkov (left) with Defence Minister Dmitry Ustinov (center), during Exercise Zapad-81 (1981)

Ogarkov was a strong advocate of reconstructing the huge, unwieldy Soviet military machine into a smaller, more compact strike force based around advanced technology. In a candid exchange with an American journalist in 1982, he had admitted that:

"Soviet technology is a generation or two behind America. In your country, even small children play with computers. We do not even have them in every office of the Defense Ministry. And for reasons you well know, we cannot easily make computers available in our society. Economic reforms are sorely needed, but they will most likely also entail political reforms."

This openness was in sharp contrast with the anti-American rhetoric he displayed during the aftermath of the KAL-007 shootdown. Aside from Ogarkov's belief that fundamental changes needed to be made to the Soviet socioeconomic status quo, he also ran afoul of army officers who believed in a more traditional World War II style of warfare. In a 1984 article in the army newspaper Krasnaya Zvezda, Ogarkov outlined his vision for modernizing the Soviet military.

During the years of leadership of the Soviet General Staff, Ogarkov prepared and conducted several of the largest operational-strategic exercises and maneuvers in the history of the Soviet Armed Forces in all major strategic directions and with the use of all branched of the Soviet Armed Forces, military scientific and military-industrial bodies. The largest of these was the operational-strategic exercise, code-named Exercise Zapad-81, which was conducted in September 1981. In terms of its scale, it is comparable only to major operations during World War II. It was the first to test an industrial control system and some types of precision-guided munitions. Ogarkov paid serious attention to the development of the theory of control of Strategic Missile Forces and missile defense, in fact, he created a center for operational-strategic research at the General Staff.

Former secretary of the Security Council of Russia Andrey A. Kokoshin recalled that Ogarkov was among the pioneers of considering the issues of the modern revolution in military affairs.

=== Ogarkov's ousting ===
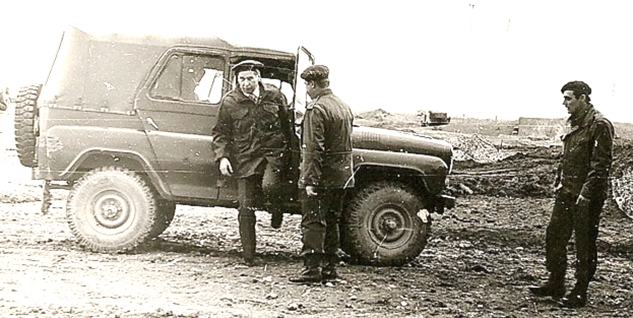
Ogarkov visiting Soviet troops stationed in Syria

Ogarkov was fired by the Politburo on 6 September 1984 in both his capacity of Chief of the General Staff and First Deputy Minister of Defense, and was replaced by Sergey Akhromeyev.

The political analyst Ilya Zemtsov has argued that Ogarkov's removal was the result of Grigory Romanov's failed ambitions to succeed Konstantin Chernenko as General Secretary. According to Zemtsov, Romanov had been trying to force a crisis of succession where his control of the armed forces, via his good relations to Ogarkov, would have tipped a split within the Politburo to his favor. Furthermore, the Politburo was worried about Ogarkov's rapid ascension: Ogarkov had already weakened the power of the Main Political Administration, the organisation tasked with keeping the military under party control, and he had gained access to the Defense Council, though not as a voting member. Romanov, who was preparing for a diplomatic mission, could not protect Ogarkov from being dismissed from his positions for "unpartylike tendencies".

Raymond L. Garthoff has written that although "the reasons for Ogarkov's abrupt removal are not known, there is little question that they concerned matters of defense allocation". Contrary to Zemtsov, Garthoff argued that "There is no indication that Ogarkov was involved in factional political infighting".

Ogarkov was soon after made commander of a newly created Western theater of war command.

=== Career after ousting ===
From August 1988 to January 1992, he served as inspector general of the Group of Inspectors General of the Ministry of Defense. At the same time, from 1990 to August 1991, he headed the All-Union Council of Veterans of War, Labor, Armed Forces and Law Enforcement Agencies.

Following the dissolution of Soviet Union, in January 1992, he was appointed advisor to the newly formed Ministry of Defense of the Russian Federation and at the same time, as an adviser to the Chief of the General Staff of the Joint Armed Forces of the Commonwealth of Independent States. As an adviser to the Ministry of Defense, Ogarkov communicated primarily with the First Deputy Minister of Defense of the Russian Federation Andrey A. Kokoshin and the chiefs of the General Staff of the Armed Forces of the Russian Federation, Generals of the Army Viktor Dubynin and Mikhail Kolesnikov. Kokoshin noted that consultations with Ogarkov were very important for working out optimal decisions on the first state arms program of the Russian Federation.

== Personal life and death ==
Ogarkov was married to Raisa Georgievna Ogarkova (1920–2004). They had several children and grandchildren.

Ogarkov died on 23 January 1994, in Moscow after a long illness. He was buried with full military honors at the Novodevichy Cemetery.

== Awards ==
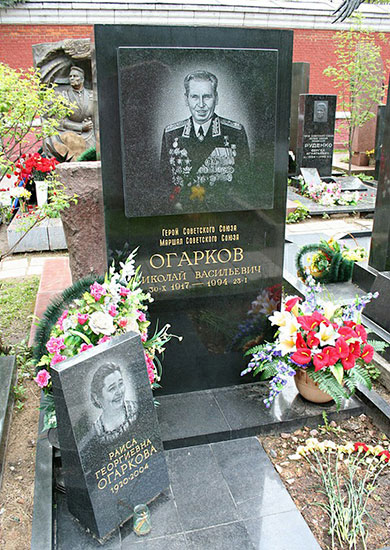
Ogarkov's grave at Novodevichy Cemetery

USSR

Hero of the Soviet Union (28 October 1977)
Two Orders of Lenin (28 October 1977, 28 April 1980)
Order of the October Revolution (29 October 1987)
Order of the Red Banner (21 February 1969)
Order of Suvorov, 1st Class (4 November 1981)
Medal "For Battle Merit"
Orders of the Patriotic War, 1st class, twice (23 June 1945, 6 April 1985)
Order of the Patriotic War, 2nd class (22 October 1944)
Two Orders of the Red Star (5 November 1954, 28 October 1967)
Order for Service to the Homeland in the Armed Forces of the USSR, 3rd class (30 April 1975)
Medal "For the Defence of the Soviet Transarctic" (1944)
Medal "For the Capture of Budapest" (1945)
Medal "For the Victory over Germany in the Great Patriotic War 1941–1945" (1945)
Jubilee Medal "Twenty Years of Victory in the Great Patriotic War 1941-1945" (1965)
Jubilee Medal "Thirty Years of Victory in the Great Patriotic War 1941–1945" (1975)
Jubilee Medal "Forty Years of Victory in the Great Patriotic War 1941–1945" (1985)
Jubilee Medal "In Commemoration of the 100th Anniversary of the Birth of Vladimir Ilyich Lenin" (1969)
Jubilee Medal "30 Years of the Soviet Army and Navy" (1948)
Jubilee Medal "40 Years of the Armed Forces of the USSR" (1958)
Jubilee Medal "50 Years of the Armed Forces of the USSR" (1968)
Jubilee Medal "60 Years of the Armed Forces of the USSR" (1978)
Jubilee Medal "70 Years of the Armed Forces of the USSR" (1988)
Medal "Veteran of the Armed Forces of the USSR" (1976)
Medal "For the Development of Virgin Lands" (1956)
Medal "For Strengthening of Brotherhood in Arms"
Medal "For Impeccable Service", 1st class

- Lenin Prize (1981)

Foreign

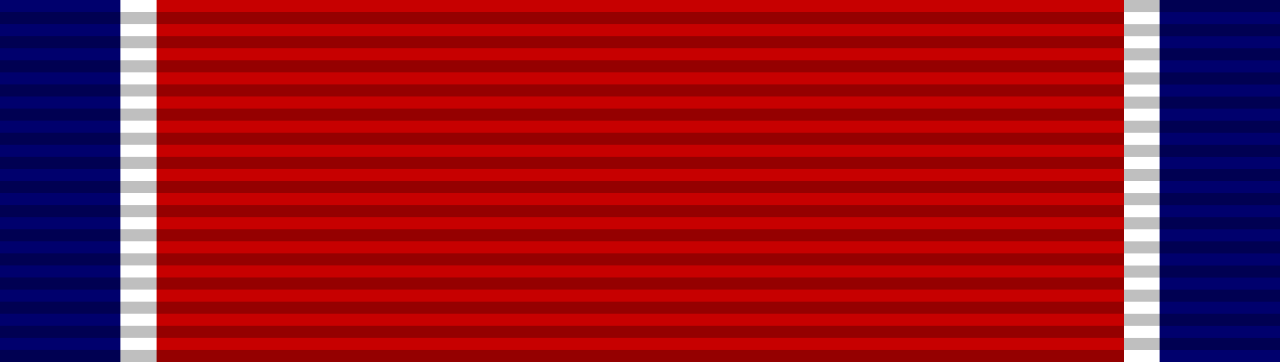
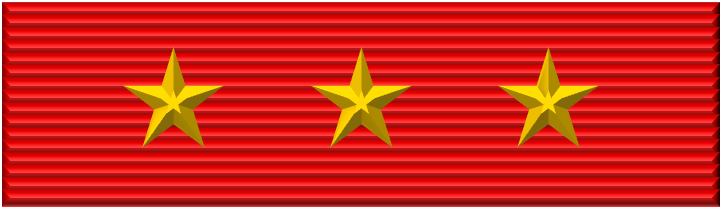
Order of The People's Republic of Bulgaria, 1st class (Bulgaria)
Order of Military Merit (Bulgaria)
Medal of Sino-Soviet Friendship (China)
Order of the Red Banner (Czechoslovakia)
Military Merit Medal (Czechoslovakia)
Medal “For Strengthening Friendship in Arms”, Golden class (Czechoslovakia)
Scharnhorst Order (East Germany)
Order of the Flag of the Republic of Hungary, 1st and 3rd class (Hungary)
Order of Sukhbaatar (Mongolia)
Order of the Red Banner (Mongolia)
Medal "30 Years of the Victory in Khalkhin-Gol" (Mongolia)
Medal for the Liberation of Korea (North Korea)
Order of Polonia Restituta, 3rd class (Poland)
Brotherhood of Arms Medal (Poland)
Order of Tudor Vladimirescu, 1st class (Romania)
Military Exploit Order, 1st class (Vietnam)

== Legacy ==
In 2003, a regional museum was opened in Molokovo. The museum is named after Ogarkov and presents expositions about his life. A memorial plaque honoring him was inaugurated on the wall of house at Sivtsev Vrazhek Lane in Moscow, where Ogarkov lived from 1976 to 1994. In February 2018, one of the control rooms of the National Defense Management Center of the Russian Federation was also named after him.

== In popular culture ==
In establishing one of the animating ideas for his novel, Breakpoint, Richard Clarke includes a discussion of technological advantage in revolution in military affairs using the precedent of the end of the Cold War. He characterizes Ogarkov as the first Soviet military leader who "realized that the gap [in technology] had gotten so wide that they could not catch up. So they gave up ...".

Military offices
Preceded by Viktor Kulikov	Chief of the General Staff of the Armed Forces of the Soviet Union; 7 January 1977 – September 1984	Succeeded by Sergey Akhromeyev
