= Ambinder =

Ambinder is a surname. Notable people with the surname include:

- Marc Ambinder (born c. 1978), American university professor, journalist, and producer
- Mike Ambinder, American experimental psychologist
