= Help! Mom! There Are Liberals Under My Bed =

Children's picture book promoting conservative values

Help! Mom! There Are Liberals Under My Bed, published by World Ahead Publishing.

Help! Mom! There are Liberals Under my Bed! (ISBN 0-9767269-0-4) is a children's picture book that depicts caricatures of liberal politicians such as Hillary Clinton and Ted Kennedy in order to advocate conservative values. It was written by Katharine DeBrecht and was published by World Ahead Publishing in 2005.

== Background ==
The book was first announced by U.S. News & World Report, which called it "a picture book for kid conservatives". Domestic reactions along political lines included radio host Rush Limbaugh, who praised the book. After Limbaugh's on-air praise, the book's position on Amazon.com sales charts rose significantly, and at one point it trailed only the latest edition Harry Potter in children's books. However, it became controversial and was mocked by The Daily Show along with the book Why Mommy is a Democrat for the notion that young children lack the ability to grasp politics and are too impressionable to be exposed to such material.

Responding to the media coverage, Philippe Reines, the press secretary for Sen. Hillary Clinton – who is one of the book's cartoon villains – fired back, "Can’t wait for the sequel, Help! Mom! I Can’t Read This Book Because Republicans Have Cut Literacy Programs!" DeBrecht replied, "It's ironic that Hillary's press secretary would call for more government intrusion into our lives while bashing my book... Evidently Hillary thinks it takes a village to teach a child to read!" Reines later responded by claiming that sales of the book must have been poor, in spite of evidence to the contrary.

Foreign media in the United Kingdom, Australia, and India also covered the book.

At the end of 2005, the New York Times announced that the book was one of the most blogged about books of the year. It was also profiled in Publishers Weekly.
