= Coalition of the willing =

Temporary international partnership for a specific goal

A coalition of the willing is a rhetorical term referring to a temporary international partnership created for the purpose of achieving a particular objective, usually of military or political nature.

== Origin ==
The term was coined in the early 1970s by MIT professor Lincoln P. Bloomfield and his colleagues, including Harland Cleveland of the University of Minnesota. In July 1971, Bloomfield described the need for a coalition of willing nations to support important peacekeeping or conflict stabilization goals endorsed by the UN, in a NYT op-ed. The term was picked up by Secretary of State Henry Kissinger in a 1973 letter to Bloomfield, acknowledging the latter's "proposal for 'coalitions of the willing'." On May 9, 1988, Cleveland wrote a letter 'for the record' to the editor of Foreign Affairs making clear that Bloomfield was the originator of the phrase, first published in his 1974 book In Search of American Foreign Policy. In 2002, Bloomfield published another op-ed, insisting that Cleveland share credit for the phrase.

== Usage ==
=== Military and political ===
The term was used by US President Bill Clinton in June 1994 in relation to possible operations against North Korea, at the height of the 1994 stand-off with the country over nuclear weapons.

In his letter introducing the 2002 National Security Strategy, US President George W. Bush emphasized the important role of "coalitions of the willing."

Coalition of the willing referred to the US-led Multi-National Force – Iraq, the military command during the 2003 invasion of Iraq and much of the ensuing Iraq War.

It has also been applied to the Australian-led INTERFET operation in East Timor from 1999 until 2000.

On March 1, 2025, Czech president Petr Pavel made a social media post on X, calling for the formation of a coalition of the willing to end the Russian invasion of Ukraine. The next day, British prime minister Keir Starmer echoed this sentiment after an international summit hosted in London between 18 European leaders. He said that the UK would work with France and other European countries to provide security guarantees for Ukraine, with a long-term goal of a peace agreement of some kind with Russia.

On August 18, 2025 President of the European Commission Ursula von der Leyen termed the emergency summit of European leaders at the August 2025 White House multilateral meeting on Ukraine "the Coalition of the Willing".

=== Other ===
Ralph Gonsalves of Saint Vincent and the Grenadines referred to the partnership of Fidel Castro of Cuba, Patrick Manning of Trinidad and Tobago, and Hugo Chávez of Venezuela for the construction of the Argyle International Airport as “the Coalition of the Willing," with a display dedicated to it located at the airport. Manning also sought to create a "coalition of the willing" in the form of an economic union with member states from the Organisation of Eastern Caribbean States in 2008.

The People's Partnership administration of former prime minister of Trinidad and Tobago Kamla Persad-Bissessar which won the 2010 Trinidad and Tobago general election has been referenced as a "coalition of the willing."

In the early 2000s, Hungary’s Ambassador to the U.S. Andras Simonyi formed a charity rock band he named "Coalition of the Willing" with former Steely Dan and Doobie Brothers guitarist Jeff "Skunk" Baxter and U.S. officials, including then-Assistant Secretary of State Lincoln Bloomfield Jr.
