= Eric D. Newsom =

American diplomat and State Department official (1943–2025)

Eric Newsom

13th Assistant Secretary of State for Political-Military Affairs
- In office November 2, 1998 – December 31, 2000
- President: Bill Clinton
- Preceded by: Thomas E. McNamara
- Succeeded by: Lincoln P. Bloomfield Jr.

Personal details
- Born: April 5, 1943 Oklahoma, U.S.
- Died: October 15, 2025 (aged 82)
- Education: University of California, Berkeley (B.A., M.A.)

Eric David Newsom (April 5, 1943 – October 15, 2025) was an American diplomat and State Department official.

== Life and career ==
Eric D. Newsom was born on April 5, 1943, in Oklahoma and raised in Modesto, California. He graduated from Modesto High School in 1961. After high school, he attended the University of California, Berkeley, receiving a B.A. in History in 1965, and an M.A. in Modern European History in 1967.

Newsom joined the United States Foreign Service in October 1967. As a Foreign Service Officer, he served as Vice Consul in Montevideo, Uruguay; Special Assistant to the United States Ambassador to the United Kingdom; on the staff of the Office of the Secretary of State; Special Assistant to the Director for nuclear policy issues in the Bureau of Political-Military Affairs; and Deputy Director of the Office of International Security Policy.

Newsom left the Foreign Service in July 1979, at which time he became a professional staff member for national security affairs with the United States Senate Committee on Foreign Relations.

From February 1981 to August 1982, Newsom worked with former United States Secretary of State, Cyrus Vance, in the preparation of his memoirs.

In August 1982, Newsom became a professional staff member of the United States Senate Select Committee on Intelligence. From 1985 to 1987, he was the committee's Minority Staff Director. In January 1989, he became the Staff Director of the United States Senate Appropriations Subcommittee on State, Foreign Operations, and Related Programs, a position he held until March 1994.

In 1994, Newsom became Principal Deputy Assistant Secretary of State for Political-Military Affairs. In 1998, President of the United States Bill Clinton nominated Newsom as Assistant Secretary of State for Political-Military Affairs. After Senate confirmation, Newsom held this office from November 2, 1998 to December 31, 2000.

Upon retiring from government service effective December 31, 2000, Newsom joined the foreign policy and defense consulting firm of Collins and Company as Vice President for International Business.

Newsom died on October 15, 2025, at the age of 82.

== Sources ==
- State Department Profile
- Profile from the Elliott School of International Affairs

Government offices
Preceded by Thomas E. McNamara	Assistant Secretary of State for Political-Military Affairs; November 2, 1998 – December 31, 2000	Succeeded by Lincoln P. Bloomfield, Jr.
