= Beacon Global Strategies =

American strategic advisory firm

Beacon Global Strategies LLC
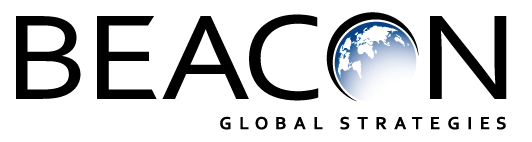
- Company type: Private
- Industry: International Strategic Consulting
- Founded: Washington DC (2013)
- Headquarters: Washington, DC, United States
- Area served: Worldwide
- Key people: Michael Allen (Managing Director); Jeremy Bash (Managing Director); Andrew Shapiro (Managing Director)
- Website: www.beaconglobalstrategies.com

Beacon Global Strategies LLC (BGS) is a Washington, DC–based strategic advisory firm founded by Jeremy Bash, Philippe Reines, and Andrew Shapiro in 2013. Philippe Reines left the firm as of September 2017. According to the firm's website, Beacon Global Strategies specializes in matters of international policy, foreign affairs, national defense, cyber, intelligence, and homeland security.

== About BGS ==
A September 2013 article in Defense News, describes Beacon Global Strategies as unique for a Washington consulting firm because of its partners' intent to eventually return to government. The article noted that "Part of the confidence in future public service may stem from a combination of significant titles and relative youth, paired with the fact that most of the founders of the firm have ties to former Secretary of State Hillary Clinton, who may be a presidential favorite heading into the 2016 election if she decides to run."

A September 2013 profile of Beacon Global Strategies in The Washington Post highlighted the firm's bipartisan make up: "'We want to build bipartisan support for solutions to complex national security problems,' Bash said, noting that cooperation between Democrats and Republicans on these issues 'has been lacking in recent years.'"

== BGS leadership ==
Beacon's Managing Directors served in a variety of government positions prior to founding or joining the firm.

Michael Allen served as Majority Staff Director of the House Permanent Select Committee on Intelligence (HPSCI), under Chairman Mike Rogers (R-MI) from 2011 to 2013. He previously served in the George W. Bush White House. Allen is the author of "Blinking Red: Crisis and Compromise in American Intelligence after 9/11" (Potomac Books Inc. September 2013).

Jeremy Bash was the only Obama Administration official to have served as Chief of Staff in two national security departments or agencies: first as Chief of Staff to the Director of the CIA (2009–2011) and most recently as Chief of Staff to the Secretary of Defense (2011–2013).

Andrew Shapiro is the former and longest serving Senate confirmed United States Assistant Secretary of State for Political-Military Affairs (2009–2013). During the presidential transition of Barack Obama, Shapiro was a member of the Obama-Biden Department of Defense Agency Review Team, and during the 2008 presidential election, a member of Hillary Clinton's campaign, advising on foreign affairs.

Ivan Kanapathy, senior defense official for Asia during the Trump and Biden administrations, serves as BGS Vice President (as of November 2023).
