= Robert Gallucci =

American academic and diplomat (born 1946)

11th Assistant Secretary of State for Political-Military Affairs
- In office July 13, 1992 – October 11, 1994
- President: George H. W. Bush; Bill Clinton
- Preceded by: Richard A. Clarke
- Succeeded by: Thomas E. McNamara

Personal details
- Born: February 11, 1946 (age 80) Brooklyn, New York, U.S.

Robert L. Gallucci (born February 11, 1946) is an American academic and diplomat, who formerly worked as president of the John D. and Catherine T. MacArthur Foundation. He previously served as dean of the Edmund A. Walsh School of Foreign Service at Georgetown University, from 1996 to June 2009. Prior to his appointment in 1996, for over two decades he had served in various governmental and international agencies, including the Department of State and the United Nations.

== Early life and education ==
Gallucci was born in Brooklyn, New York. He graduated from Brentwood High School. Afterwards he attended Stony Brook University for his undergraduate studies, later earning his master's degree and doctorate in politics from Brandeis University. After his post-graduate studies, he taught at Swarthmore College, Paul H. Nitze School of Advanced International Studies at Johns Hopkins University and Georgetown University. He has received fellowships from the Council on Foreign Relations, the International Institute for Strategic Studies, Harvard University, and the Brookings Institution.

== Career ==
Gallucci left the world of academia in 1974 and went on to hold various positions relating to international affairs. He first found employment at the Arms Control and Disarmament Agency. Four years later, he became a division chief in the Department of State's Bureau of Intelligence and Research. From 1979 to 1981, he was a member of the Secretary's policy planning staff. He then served as an office director in both the Bureau of Near Eastern and South Asian Affairs and in the Bureau of Political-Military Affairs for a year each.

Ten years after beginning his foreign affairs career, he left Washington, D.C., to serve as the deputy director general of the Multinational Force and Observers, the Sinai peacekeeping force headquartered in Rome. He returned in 1988 to join the faculty of the National War College, where he taught for three years. In April 1991 he moved to New York to take up an appointment as the deputy executive chairman of the United Nations Special Commission (UNSCOM) overseeing the disarmament of Iraq. He returned again to Washington in 1992 to join the Office of the Deputy Secretary as the senior coordinator responsible for nonproliferation and nuclear safety initiatives in the former Soviet Union. In July of the same year his appointment as the Assistant Secretary of State for Political-Military Affairs was confirmed. During the North Korean nuclear crisis of 1994, Gallucci was the chief U.S. negotiator. He also has served as an ambassador-at-large with the Department of State, since August 1994.

Gallucci returned to Georgetown University as dean of the Edmund A. Walsh School of Foreign Service on May 1, 1996. In March 1998, the Department of State appointed him as special envoy to deal with the threat posed by the proliferation of ballistic missiles and weapons of mass destruction, a position which he held until January 2001. As a dean at Georgetown University, Gallucci recommended conservative Douglas J. Feith to a 2-year faculty position which Feith occupied in the fall of 2006, a move which generated protests from some liberal faculty and students. In 2015, Gallucci became director of The John W. Kluge Center at the Library of Congress.

== Published works ==
Going Critical: The First North Korean Nuclear Crisis, with Joel S. Wit and Daniel B. Poneman (The Brookings Institution, April 2004).

Neither Peace Nor Honor: The Politics of American Military Policy in Viet-Nam (Johns Hopkins University Press, 1975).

"North Korea, Iran and the Proliferation of Nuclear Weapons: The Threat, U.S. Policy and the Prescription… and the India Deal," in Stephen van Evera, ed., How to Make America Safe (Cambridge, MA: The Tobin Project, 2006), pp. 23–32.

"Averting Nuclear Catastrophe: Contemplating Extreme Responses to U.S. Vulnerability," Annals of the American Academy of Political and Social Science, Vol. 607 (September 2006), pp. 51–58.

"America Deals with North Korea: A Realist's Approach," in Perspectives on Structural Realism, Andrew K. Hanami (Ed.) (Palgrave Macmillan, 2003).

"Weighing Sovereignty in the 'Sit Room:' Does It Enter or End the Debate?" in The Sacred and The Sovereign: Rethinking Religion and International Politics, John Carlson and Erik Owens, Eds. (Georgetown University Press, 2003).

"A Question of Strategic Nuclear Weapons Policy," Review Essay in Naval War College Review (Winter 2002).

"Negotiating Korean Unification: Options for an International Framework," in Korea's Future and the Great Powers, Nicholas Eberstadt and Richard J. Ellings, Eds. (National Bureau of Asian Research, 2001).

"The U.S. – North Korea Agreed Framework and the Korea Policy of the United States," in The Two Koreas and the United States (M.E. Sharpe Inc., 2000).

"U.S. Nonproliferation Policy: Lessons Learned from Our Experience with Iraq and North Korea," in Pulling Back From the Nuclear Brink: Reducing and Countering Nuclear Threats (Frank Cass Publishers, 1998).

Limiting U.S. Policy Options to Prevent Nuclear Weapons Proliferation: The Relevance of Minimum Deterrence (Lawrence Livermore National Laboratory, Center for Technical Studies on Security, Energy, and Arms Control, 1991).

"Factors Influencing the Proliferation of Nuclear Weapons," in Brito and Intriligator (eds.), Strategies for Managing Nuclear Proliferation: Economic and Political Issues (Lexington Books, 1983).

"Western Europe," in Williams and Desse (eds.), Nuclear Non-Proliferation: The Spent Fuel Problem (Pergamon Policy Studies, 1979).

Government offices
Preceded by Richard A. Clarke	Assistant Secretary of State for Political-Military Affairs; July 13, 1992 – October 11, 1994	Succeeded by Thomas E. McNamara
