= Fleet White =

American author and diplomat

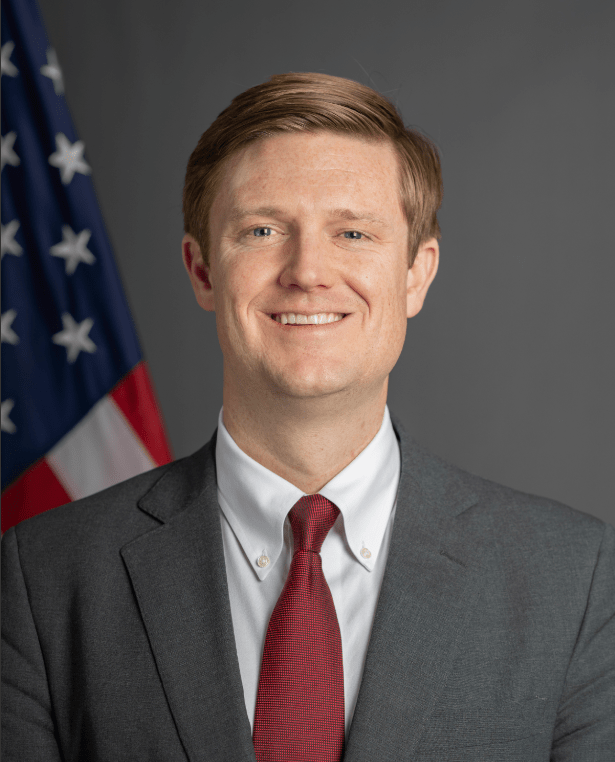

Assistant Secretary of State for Political-Military Affairs
- Incumbent
- Assumed office August 14, 2026
- President: Donald Trump
- Preceded by: Jessica Lewis

Personal details
- Education: United States Naval Academy; University of Chicago Law School

Military service
- Allegiance: United States
- Branch/service: United States Navy
- Unit: Submarine

Fleet White is an American lawyer and diplomat who is serving Assistant Secretary of State for Political-Military Affairs since August 2026 under the second Trump administration. Previously, he served in the Department of State as a Senior Attorney-Adviser in the Office of the Legal Adviser and as the Senior Bureau Official and Deputy Assistant Secretary for Regional Security and Security Assistance in the Bureau of Political-Military Affairs.

== Career ==
Prior to joining the Department of State, Fleet was an associate at Covington & Burling LLP in Washington, D.C. where he focused on white collar defense and investigations. Prior to practicing law, he was a submarine officer in the U.S. Navy. At sea, Fleet served on a fast attack submarine stationed in Pearl Harbor, Hawaii. Ashore, Fleet worked at the Pentagon on the Secretary of the Navy’s staff and on Capitol Hill as a liaison to the U.S. Senate where he traveled with senators on congressional delegations around the world. White Co-chaired high-level bilateral discussions, such as regional security and political-security-defense dialogues with international partners like Vietnam.
