= Philippe Reines =

American political consultant (born 1969)

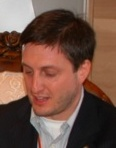
- Born: November 25, 1969 (age 56); New York City, New York, U.S.
- Education: Columbia University (BA)
- Political party: Democratic

Philippe I. Reines (/ˈraɪnəs/; born November 25, 1969) is an American political consultant. He joined the Department of State as a senior advisor to Hillary Clinton when she became United States Secretary of State in January 2009, and was promoted to deputy assistant secretary of state for strategic communications in 2010.

Reines was a managing director at Beacon Global Strategies, which he founded with partners Jeremy Bash and Andrew J. Shapiro in 2013.

== Early life and education ==
A New York City native, he attended the Ramaz School, an independent Modern Orthodox Jewish prep school on the Upper East Side. Reines earned a Bachelor of Arts degree in political science from the Columbia University School of General Studies.

== Career ==
=== 2000–2003 ===
Reines was a member of the Al Gore 2000 presidential campaign's rapid response operation. Reines remained involved in former Vice President Gore's public activities after Gore left office in 2001, going on to serve as Gore's teaching assistant and de facto spokesperson at the Columbia University Graduate School of Journalism when Gore taught the course "Covering National Affairs in the Information Age," in spring 2001. In December 2002 he contributed material for Gore's appearance on Saturday Night Live.

After the 2000 Presidential election was decided, Reines returned to New York and spent a year as Deputy Communications Director for the New York City Council before joining Speaker Peter Vallone's mayoral bid. He later worked briefly as Communications Director for U.S. Representative Jane Harman (D-CA).

Beginning in July 2002, Reines served as press secretary for Hillary Rodham Clinton, during her term as New York senator. Over the next several years he became an increasingly trusted adviser to Clinton, and a key adviser on Iraq issues.

In 2003, Reines helped orchestrate the media campaign and seven-month book tour that accompanied the release of Living History, Senator Clinton's bestselling memoir of her time in the White House. As the primary point of contact between Senator Clinton's official office and the national press corps, Reines served as one of Senator Clinton's primary spokesmen, and was responsible for many of her interviews and media appearances.

=== 2008–2012 ===
During the 2008 United States presidential election, in addition to his role as press secretary and senior advisor to Hillary Clinton, he served as a spokesman for Chelsea Clinton, traveling with her throughout the primaries.

When Clinton took up her post as Secretary of State, in January 2009, Reines was appointed as her senior advisor. By 2010 he had been named Deputy Assistant Secretary of State for Strategic Communications.

A scathing piece by Politico in March 2009 highlighted Reines's responsibility for one of Clinton's early gaffes as Secretary of State – an erroneous Russian translation of the word "Reset" on a gag button presented to Clinton's Russian counterpart, Sergei Lavrov.

In July 2009, Reines struck a deal with journalist Marc Ambinder to provide an advance copy of a Hillary Clinton speech to Ambinder in exchange for positive reporting on Clinton.

In its December 2009 profile of Hillary Clinton, Vogue magazine described him as Clinton's "Michael Clayton-esque image man and fixer." In March 2010, The Washington Post's WhoRunsGov, a site offering user-contributed political profiles, moderated by an editorial team, included a profile of Reines as Deputy Assistant Secretary of State, in its "Power 25: Press" series; and in July 2010, Politico included Reines in their "50 Politicos to Watch" list, categorizing him as a "fixer".

In September 2012, Reines vigorously took issue with CNN over its use of Ambassador to Libya J. Christopher Stevens's diary, which CNN found at the site of an attack on the US consulate in Benghazi which killed the ambassador. CNN fired back by suggesting that the State Department was "attacking the messenger" because of "questions about why the State Department didn’t do more to protect Ambassador Stevens." Some media critics sided with CNN and questioned whether Reines' real grievance was indeed with CNN's disrespect for the privacy wishes of Stevens' family; BuzzFeed published an email exchange between Reines and journalist Michael Hastings where the Deputy Assistant Secretary of State told Hastings to "Fuck off." Reines also took issue with a reporter's questions in December 2012, calling a Fox News correspondent's question about his boss "absolutely asinine."

=== 2016 ===
In the debate preparations for Hillary Clinton in the 2016 presidential election, Reines stood in for Donald Trump. CBS commented that Reines is "known for his bullish, combative personality—traits that often mirror Trump’s personal debate style".

=== 2024 ===
Similar to his role in 2016, Reines assisted Kamala Harris with her debate preparations. Reines again reprised his role playing Trump in mock debates.
