= Lincoln P. Bloomfield =

Lincoln Palmer Bloomfield
- Born: 1920
- Died: October 30, 2013 (aged 93)
- Education: Harvard University (BA, MPA, PhD)
- Spouse: Irirangi Coates Bloomfield
- Children: Pamela Bloomfield, Lincoln P. Bloomfield Jr., Diana Bloomfield
- Writing career
- Subject: Foreign policy
- Notable work: A World Effectively Controlled by the United Nations: A Preliminary Survey of One Form of a Stable Military Environment (1962)

Lincoln Palmer Bloomfield (1920–2013) was an American academic and expert on foreign affairs who served as a Professor Emeritus of Political Science at the Massachusetts Institute of Technology.

== Biography ==
Bloomfield served in the US Navy and Office of Strategic Services during World War II, worked in the State Department in the early years of the United Nations until 1956, and in 1979 was director of global issues on the National Security Council during the Carter administration.

Bloomfield was a member of the Council on Foreign Relations.

Bloomfield's work at the Massachusetts Institute of Technology included designing and leading war games aimed at preventing escalation to nuclear war and the development of the CASCON conflict analysis system, featuring an interactive software and database.

Bloomfield is credited with coining the term coalition of the willing. He taught for four semesters at the Graduate Institute of International Studies in Geneva, Switzerland.

Lincoln P. Bloomfield is the father of Lincoln P. Bloomfield Jr., a former United States Defense Department, Office of the Vice President and State Department official.

== Works ==
=== Books ===
- International Military Forces: The Question of Peacekeeping in an Armed and Disarming World. Boston: Little, Brown, 1964.
- Khrushchev and the Arms Race: Soviet Interests in Arms Control and Disarmament, 1954-1964. Cambridge: MIT Press, 1966.
- The United Nations and U.S. Foreign Policy: A New Look at the National Interest. Boston: Little, Brown, 1967.
- Controlling Small Wars: A Strategy for the 1970's. New York: Knopf, 1969.
- The Foreign Policy Process: A Modern Primer. Englewood Cliffs, NJ: Prentice-Hall, 1982. ISBN 978-0133265040
- Prospects for Peacemaking: A Citizen's Guide to Safer Nuclear Strategy. Edited with Harlan Cleveland. Cambridge: MIT Press, 1987. ISBN 978-0262031318

=== Articles and essays ===
- "The U.N. and National Security." Foreign Affairs, Vol. 36, No. 4, July 1958, pp. 597-610. doi:10.2307/20029314
- "Conflict Resolution: U.N. Nonfighting Forces." Naval War College Review, Vol. 20, No. 9, April 1968. JSTOR 44639288
- "Nuclear Spread and World Order." Foreign Affairs, Vol. 53, No. 4, July 1975, pp. 743-755. doi:10.2307/20039543
- "The Arctic: Last Unmanaged Frontier." Foreign Affairs, Vol. 60, No. 1, Fall 1981, pp. 87-105. doi:10.2307/20040991

=== Reports ===
- A World Effectively Controlled by the United Nations: A Preliminary Survey of One Form of a Stable Military Environment. Alexandria, VA: Institute for Defense Analyses, 1962.
- The Foreign Policy Process: Making Theory Relevant (International Studies Series). Beverly Hills, CA: SAGE Publications, 1974.
