= Why Mommy Is a Democrat =

2005 children's book by Jeremy Zilber

Why Mommy is a Democrat
- Author: Jeremy Zilber
- Illustrator: Yuliya Firsova
- Language: English
- Genre: Children's book
- Publisher: Jeremy Zilber
- Publication date: 2005
- Publication place: United States
- Media type: Paperback
- Pages: 28
- ISBN: 978-0-9786688-0-8

Why Mommy Is a Democrat is a 2005 children's book written and self-published by Jeremy Zilber that promotes the Democratic Party of the United States. The book illustrates what the author believes about the Democratic Party, with the "mommy" relating each one to something she does for her children. It was one of several partisan political books for children, including Help! Mom! There Are Liberals Under My Bed, that came out in 2006–07. Zilber has gone on to write subsequent children's books, Why Daddy Is a Democrat and Mama Voted for Obama.

== Content ==
The main characters include the "mommy" squirrel, and two youth squirrels. Each page explains a different Democratic talking point such as health care or diversity, by relating it to a motherly action. Each principle is accompanied by a colorful illustration of the three characters, always smiling. In the background, humans are used to illustrate the opposite concept (i.e., demonstrating purported negative effects of Republican policies). These background illustrations are smaller and darker, and done in such a way that most children wouldn't interpret them as attacks on Republicans.

== Reception ==
While Why Mommy Is a Democrat has sold over 22,000 copies, it has been poorly received by critics. Catherine Rampell of the Washington Post criticized the book's focus on "political brand loyalty" and noted that she found the works of Dr. Seuss better for teaching children political lessons. Nick Gillespie, editor of the libertarian magazine Reason, said that the book "reads like a Republican parody," and even "has the feel of a GOP black-bag job."

The book was also parodied in an episode of The Daily Show.
