= Against All Enemies =

2004 book by Richard A. Clarke

Against All Enemies: Inside America's War on Terror
- First edition
- Author: Richard A. Clarke
- Genre: Non-fiction
- Publisher: Free Press
- Publication date: 2004
- ISBN: 0-7432-6823-7

Against All Enemies: Inside America's War on Terror (ISBN 0-7432-6823-7) is a 2004 award-winning book by former U.S. chief counter-terrorism advisor Richard A. Clarke, criticizing past and present presidential administrations for the way they handled the war on terrorism. The book focused much of its criticism on President George W. Bush, charging that he failed to take sufficient action to protect the country in the elevated-threat period before the September 11 attacks and for the 2003 invasion of Iraq, which Clarke feels greatly hampered the war on terrorism. The book's title comes from the oath of office taken by all U.S. federal officials (except the President), in which they promise to defend the Constitution "against all enemies, foreign and domestic."

== Content ==
Clarke argues that he made numerous urgent requests for a meeting about dealing with terrorism, had CIA Director George Tenet include numerous details about Al-Qaeda in daily briefings, found an unprecedented level of terrorist "chatter" before September 11.

Soon after 9/11, he says that defense secretary Donald Rumsfeld wanted to bomb Iraq, even though there was no evidence of their involvement, because they had more "good targets" than Afghanistan, which was actually involved.

Clarke also says that on September 12, 2001, President Bush asked him to try to find evidence that Saddam Hussein was connected to the terrorist attacks. In response he wrote a report stating there was absolutely no evidence of Iraqi involvement and got it signed by all relevant agencies (the FBI, the CIA, etc.). The paper was quickly returned by a deputy with a note saying "Please update and resubmit," apparently unshown to the President.

Clarke also recalls a meeting where then Defense Deputy Secretary Paul Wolfowitz expressed doubt that Osama bin Laden could have carried out the attacks on September 11 without state sponsorship. Clarke writes that Wolfowitz attempted to connect Saddam Hussein to the first World Trade Center bombing in 1993 — a theory based on the writings of Laurie Mylroie that, according to Clarke, has been exhaustively investigated and disproven.

But perhaps most damagingly, Clarke claims that the administration has done "a terrible job" fighting terrorism, even since September 11. In particular, he feels the 2003 invasion of Iraq played right into Osama bin Laden's hands. For years, bin Laden had been producing propaganda saying that the US wants to invade and occupy an oil-rich middle eastern country, which was essentially validated by the US invasion of Iraq. As a result, says Clarke, it's not surprising that Al-Qaeda and its offshoots are having much greater success recruiting new members.

Furthermore, he feels the war has taken resources from the more important fight: stopping Al-Qaeda in Afghanistan and around the world. He points out that had his plan been followed when he first presented it, Al-Qaeda could have been essentially eliminated. But since his plan was not followed, and bin Laden was essentially ignored as the United States and allies invaded Iraq, Al-Qaeda has grown in strength and number, and is now going to be difficult to stop.

His statements seem to be backed up by Bob Woodward's Bush at War, where he quotes Bush as saying "I know (Osama bin Laden) was a menace... but I didn't feel that sense of urgency." Clarke has been backed up by testimony of former Treasury Secretary Paul O'Neill, the National Security Council's Flynt Leverett, and Clarke's deputy, Roger Cressey.

Clarke also described many of these events in his almost 20 hours of testimony under oath before the 9/11 Commission, a portion in its public hearings.

Time magazine (April 2, 2007 p. 48) reported a movie script of the book has been written but not yet made.

== Responses from the Bush administration ==
On March 22, 2004, Vice President Dick Cheney claimed that Clarke was "out of the loop" in the fight against terror. Condoleezza Rice later contradicted this, claiming the opposite: Clarke was the loop, so any failure in terrorism-preparedness was his. Later, in a direct response to Cheney's statement, she said "I would not use the word 'out of the loop,'... He was in every meeting that was held on terrorism."

Press Secretary Scott McClellan claimed that Clarke timed the publication of his book in order to influence the upcoming election. Clarke pointed out that his book had been finished since the previous year; it was only released at that time because the White House took months to review it for classified information.

Some alleged that Clarke had published the book to win a spot in a possible John Kerry administration. Clarke responded by swearing under oath that he did not want another job in the government and would not accept one.

Others pointed to the fact that Clarke taught a class with Rand Beers, an advisor to John Kerry. Clarke explained that he was a long-time friend of Beers, who had also worked extensively in the government on counterterrorism for Bush and other administrations, and would not give up his friendship simply because his friend had a new job.

Another major criticism of Clarke was that he had been more supportive of the Bush administration when he worked there as a special advisor to the President. Fox News Channel released a transcript from an August 2002 briefing that Clarke gave to reporters while he was still working for the White House, as background (meaning not for attribution). In it Clarke says that "there was no plan on al Qaeda that was passed from the Clinton administration to the Bush administration," and otherwise puts the Bush administration in a more favorable light. Questioned about this apparent inconsistency, Clarke said the differences were "really a matter here of emphasis and tone. I mean, what you're suggesting, perhaps, is that as special assistant to the president of the United States when asked to give a press backgrounder I should spend my time in that press backgrounder criticizing him. I think that's somewhat of an unrealistic thing to expect."

== Disputed claims of Clarke's book ==
Journalist Walter Pincus points to a passage on page 237 in which Clarke describes a September 4, 2001 meeting of national security principals in which he states Defense Secretary Donald Rumsfeld, "who looked distracted throughout the session, took the United States Deputy Secretary of Defense Wolfowitz line that there were other terrorists concerns, like Iraq." Rumsfeld has publicly stated he was not at the September 4, 2001 meeting, and Defense Department officials have stated he was not in attendance.

In his book My FBI, Louis Freeh writes:

In his book, Clarke recounts a critical "principals" meeting close to the millennium celebration when Sandy Berger looked hard at Janet [Reno], George Tenet, and me, and said, "We have stopped two sets of attacks planned for the millennium. You can bet your measly federal paycheck that there are more out there and we have to stop them too. I spoke with the President and he wants you all to know...this is it, nothing more important, all assets. We stop this (expletive)."

According to Freeh, the passage was a "nice tale, but I was never at such a meeting, and Sandy Berger never would have spoken like that in front of the attorney general." (page 298)

== See also ==
- Operation Orient Express
