= Ivan Kanapathy =

American security analyst

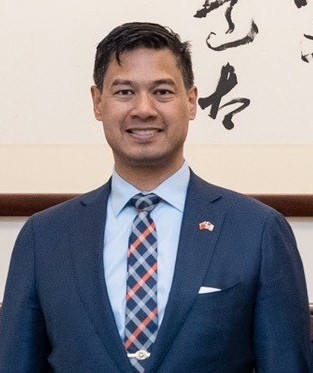

Senior Director for Asia, U.S. National Security Council
- Incumbent
- Assumed office January 21, 2025
- President: Donald Trump
- Vice President: JD Vance

Personal details
- Education: Defense Language Institute (AA), Carnegie Mellon University (BS), Naval Postgraduate School (MA)
- Occupation: Security analyst

Military service
- Branch/service: United States Marine Corps
- Rank: Lieutenant Colonel
- assignments: Military attaché, American Institute in Taiwan maintenance officer, VMFA-225

Ivan J. Kanapathy is a retired United States Marine Corps officer currently serving as senior director for Asia at the National Security Council (NSC) in the second Trump administration. Prior to returning to the White House, he was senior vice president of Beacon Global Strategies, an adjunct professor at Georgetown University Walsh School of Foreign Service, a senior associate with the Freeman Chair in China Studies at the Center for Strategic and International Studies (CSIS), and a senior fellow at the Center for Strategic and Budgetary Assessments. Between March 2018 and July 2021, he was director for China, Taiwan, and Mongolia and deputy senior director for Asian affairs at the NSC.

== Education and career ==
Kanapathy holds an AA and diploma (with highest honors) in Mandarin Chinese from the Defense Language Institute, a BS in physics and economics from Carnegie Mellon University, and an MA (with distinction) in East Asian security studies from the Naval Postgraduate School. With a background of United States Marine Corps Aviation, Kanapathy served as a Major and maintenance officer in the VMFA-225. In 2011, he was promoted to Lieutenant Colonel, serving as a military attaché at the American Institute in Taiwan from 2014 to 2017.

== Views on US-China relations ==
In a May 2022 piece analyzing recently translated articles about US strategy toward the Indo-Pacific authored by PRC scholars for CSIS, Kanapathy wrote:

In Beijing’s depictions of international relations, the United States is a declining, hegemonic bully and China an ascendant, righteous martyr standing up for multilateralism and the developing world. This worldview is self-reinforced through the political guidance and constraints within which China’s media and scholars operate. Lacking the freedom to critique Beijing’s decisions, academics cannot meaningfully debate the root causes of friction in China’s foreign relations. Nonetheless, one can glean insights from various bureaucratic stovepipes and their researchers as they compete for policy relevance in an increasingly top-down, centralized system.

He criticized the Biden administration for resuming higher-level economic dialogues with China, describing the approach as "a win for China, especially as Beijing continues to stonewall and gaslight on military risk reduction, cyber theft, and human rights" in an October 2023 interview with Reuters.

In an October 2022 interview with The New York Times about the Biden administration's campaign targeting PRC technology, he said that it was relatively easy to evade restrictions such as those put in place by the Trump administration through the Entity List as each listing was connected with only one particular company name and address. Subsequently, in a February 2023 NYT interview about U.S. sanctions toward Russia amid growing PRC economic support for Putin, he again said it was “quite easy” to bypass export control through front companies or by altering relevant entities' names and addresses, noting that “China is quite adept at that.”

== Views on US-Taiwan relations ==
Kanapathy was a member of CFR independent task force on US-Taiwan alliance, which published its study report in 2023 titled "U.S.-Taiwan Relations in a New Era: Responding to a More Assertive China."

Kanapathy and David Sacks wrote in a June 2023 Foreign Affairs piece titled What It Will Take to Deter China in the Taiwan Strait: "Washington must also do more to leverage its strong network of alliances in the Indo-Pacific, which are its most notable advantage over Beijing. China might soon believe that it could fend off U.S. military power in the region, but contending with Australia, Japan, and potentially other countries as well would be a different matter. Preparing for a conflict in the Taiwan Strait should thus become a major priority for U.S. alliance relationships, in particular the U.S.-Japanese alliance and should drive force posture and bilateral operational planning and exercises." They concluded: "Avoiding war between the United States and China is relatively easy; doing so while also protecting the substantial U.S. interests at stake in the Taiwan Strait will be incredibly difficult."

== Publications ==
=== Books and chapters ===
- Chapter 5: Countering China's Use of Force and Chapter 6: Countering China's Gray-Zone Activities, in The Boiling Moat: Urgent Steps to Defend Taiwan, 2024 (edited by Matthew Pottinger)

=== Articles ===
- America Is Showering China With New Restrictions, Foreign Policy, February 15, 2022 (co-authored with Eric Sayers)
- Taiwan Doesn't Need a Formal U.S. Security Guarantee, Foreign Policy, April 26, 2022
- What It Will Take to Deter China in the Taiwan Strait, Foreign Affairs, June 15, 2023 (co-authored with David Sacks)
