= National Intelligence Distinguished Public Service Medal =

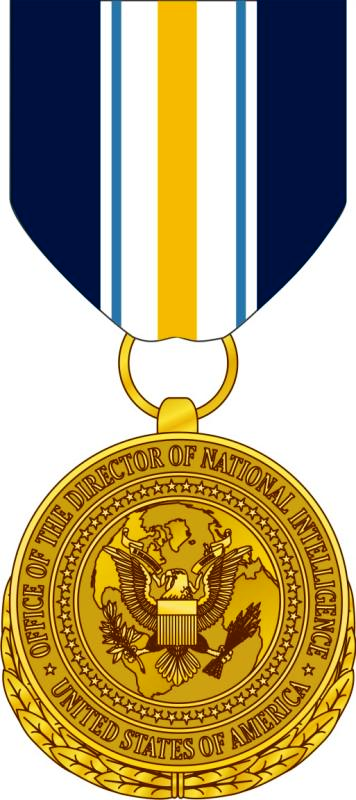
- Obverse of the National Intelligence Distinguished Public Service Medal
- Type: Individual Award
- Awarded for: distinguished service of exceptional significance to the Intelligence Community.
- Presented by: United States Intelligence Community
- Eligibility: highest award that can be granted to noncareer Federal employees, private citizens or others who have performed distinguished service of exceptional significance to the Intelligence Community.
- Status: Active
- Established: October 1, 2008
- First award: Senator John Warner
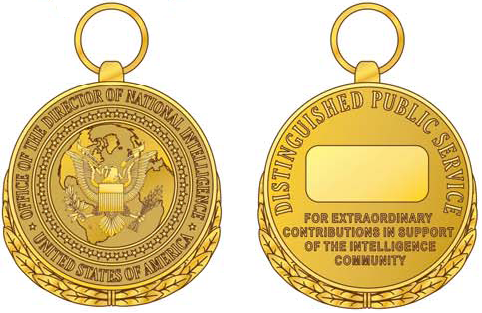
- Obverse and reverse of medal and ribbon bar of the medal

Precedence
- Equivalent: National Intelligence Distinguished Service Medal
- Next (lower): National Intelligence Superior Public Service Medal

The National Intelligence Distinguished Public Service Medal is the highest award that can be granted to noncareer Federal employees, private citizens or others who have performed distinguished service of exceptional significance for the United States Intelligence Community. The Director of National Intelligence (DNI) established the award on October 1, 2008 to acknowledge individuals who rendered extraordinary service at considerable personal sacrifice and who were motivated by patriotism, good citizenship or a sense of public responsibility.

== Award design ==
The obverse of the medal is a gold circular disc with the symbol of the Office of the Director of National Intelligence.

The reverse of the medal has the words "DISTINGUISHED PUBLIC SERVICE" encircled from the 9 o'clock position through the 3 o'clock position with the words "FOR EXTRAORDINARY CONTRIBUTIONS IN SUPPORT OF THE INTELLIGENCE COMMUNITY" inscribed horizontally and centered across the bottom of the emblem.

In addition to the large medal, a miniature medal and lapel pin are provided to awardees.

== Recipients ==
- Senator John Warner (December 12, 2008)
- Senator Jay Rockefeller (January 12, 2009)
- Ambassador Thomas E. McNamara (July 29, 2009)
- Ronald E. Brooks (October 16, 2012)
- Senator Joe Lieberman (December 11, 2012)
- Admiral William H. McRaven (2014)
- Robert Hannigan (2017)
- Dr. Paul Taloni, PSM (2018)

== See also ==
- National Intelligence Distinguished Service Medal
