= Presidential Decision Directive 25 =

Presidential Decision Directive 25 (PDD-25) is an executive order issued by President of the United States Bill Clinton on May 3, 1994 following a year-long executive agency policy review and bilateral consultations among dozens of members of Congress and the executive branch.

While the order was classified by the government, it was summarized in a memo distributed to the public on May 5, 1994. The unclassified version of the text is available online.

== United States involvement in United Nations Peacekeeping Operations ==
PDD-25 was intended to prevent the United States from using UN peacekeeping operations as the centerpiece of its foreign policy. The United States continued to consider its ability to participate in such operations as a way to advance American and U.N. interests globally. Richard A. Clarke was among those who opposed using US troops as part of UN peacekeeping forces during the Rwandan genocide of 1994.

In order to limit United States involvement in United Nations Peacekeeping Operations, PDD-25 created a "vital national interests test" to evaluate cases: this test limited United States involvement to those operations that 1) had US military officers in control of US troops, 2) a mission that was in the best interests of the US government, and 3) had popular domestic support for the operation.

The order set the goal of reducing US financial commitment to such operations from 31.7% in 1994 to around 25% in 1996.

PDD-25 was drafted based on the premise that, in the post-Cold War era, new threats to the United States would eventually emerge. The directive suggested that the United States required a military that would be able to win wars unilaterally. The directive was opposed to a standing United Nations army and prevented the earmarking of a specific number of US troops to be available to the United Nations international community.

== Criticism of the order ==
Commentators suggested the Clinton administration issued the order to counter the increasing political pressure and negative press related to the failure of the UN peacekeeping operation in Somalia. Eighteen American soldiers in the UN Operation were killed in 1993 in the Battle of Mogadishu during UNOSOM II.

However, the Clinton Administration had launched a review of US participation in peacekeeping operations earlier in February 1993 whereas the battle took place in October; similarly, analysis of the draft of PDD suggest that Mogadishu incident didn't affect the final draft explicitly.

PDD 25 was used by the government as the legal basis for deploying American soldiers into Macedonia in 1993-1999, Operation Able Sentry.

Members of Congress were not allowed to see PDD 25. The State Department said that, as of 2009, the document was declassified. The Clinton Library is the repository of this document.

The full text of PDD 25 can be found at on the Clinton Library website. The summary text is available at the website of the Federation of American Scientists.

=== Rwandan Genocide ===
The United States analysis of its vital interests test resulted in its deciding against participating in the UN peacekeeping operation proposed to end the 1994 Rwandan genocide. Richard A. Clarke, chairman of the Counter-Terrorism Security Group at the U.S. National Security Council, also recommended to Madeleine Albright, then US Ambassador to the United Nations, that the UN withdraw its peacekeeping forces from the country during that crisis.
