= Mark Kimmitt =

United States Army general (born 1954)

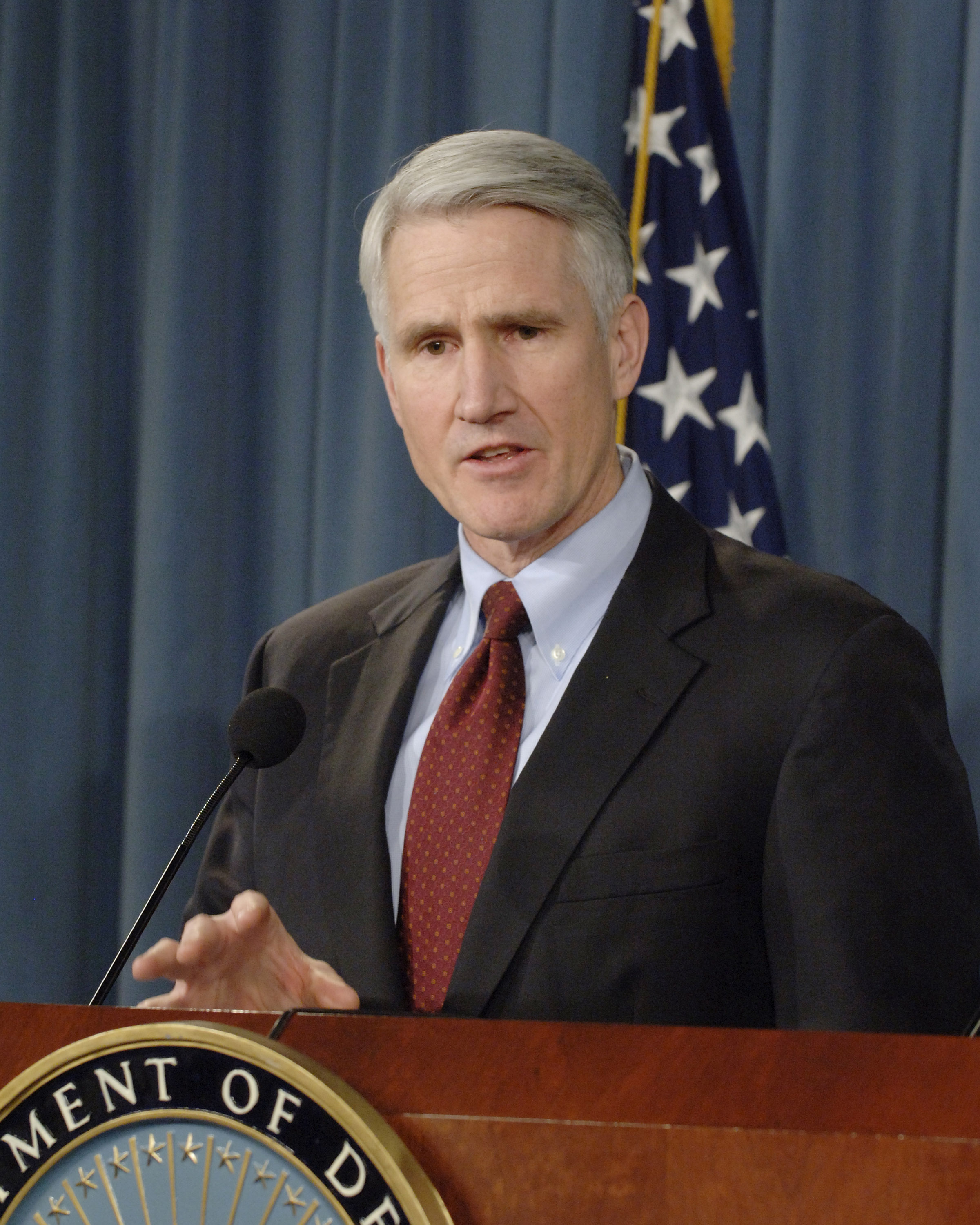

16th Assistant Secretary of State for Political-Military Affairs
- In office August 8, 2008 – January 20, 2009
- President: George W. Bush
- Preceded by: John Hillen
- Succeeded by: Andrew J. Shapiro

Deputy Assistant Secretary of Defense for the Middle East
- In office September 18, 2006 – July 31, 2008
- President: George W. Bush

Personal details
- Born: Mark Traecey Patrick Kimmitt; June 21, 1954 (age 72) Fort Sill, Oklahoma, U.S.
- Spouse: Catherine Kimmitt
- Education: United States Military Academy; Harvard University (MBA); United States Army Command and General Staff College (M.A.); National Defense University (M.A.)
- Profession: U.S. Army officer
- Awards: Defense Superior Service Medal; Legion of Merit; Bronze Star; NATO Medal (3)

Military service
- Allegiance: United States
- Branch/service: United States Army
- Years of service: 1976–2006
- Rank: Brigadier general
- Battles/wars: Bosnian War; Kosovo War; Iraq War

Mark Traecey Patrick Kimmitt (born 21 June 1954) is a retired American general and former diplomat. He served as the 16th Assistant Secretary of State for Political-Military Affairs under George W. Bush from August 2008 to January 2009. Before he joined the State Department, he was a brigadier general in the United States Army and served as the Deputy Assistant Secretary of Defense for Middle East. Kimmitt has also served as deputy director for strategy and plans for the United States Central Command and deputy director for operations/chief military spokesman for coalition forces in Iraq; he also served at NATO's SHAPE headquarters in Belgium.

== Early life and education ==
Kimmitt was born in Fort Sill, Oklahoma, while his father was stationed there. His older brother Robert also served in the U.S. Army and was the former United States Ambassador to Germany. Their father, Joseph Stanley Kimmitt, was the Secretary of the United States Senate and Secretary for the Majority from 1977 to 1981.

Kimmitt graduated from the United States Military Academy at West Point as a part of the class of 1976, and earned a Masters in Business Administration degree from Harvard University as part of the class of 1984. He also received Master of Arts degrees from the United States Army Command and General Staff College and the National Defense University. He earned a certification as a Chartered Financial Analyst (CFA) while serving as assistant professor of finance and economics in the Department of Social Sciences at the United States Military Academy.

== Personal life ==
He is married to Catherine Kimmitt.

== Military career ==
Kimmitt retired from the US Army a brigadier general in December 2006. While in the Army, Kimmitt had command and staff assignments throughout the United States, Europe, Asia and the Middle East, including planning positions within both Allied and Joint service commands. Additionally, he spent three years as an assistant professor and instructor with the Military Academy's Department of Social Sciences.

Kimmitt's professional military education includes the Field Artillery Officer Basic and Armor Officer Advanced Courses, the Army Command and General Staff College, the Advanced Military Studies Program, and the National War College. Kimmitt completed Ranger, Airborne, Jumpmaster, Naval Gunfire, Joint Firepower Control, Air Assault, Pathfinder, and Jungle Schools.

=== Timeline ===
Kimmitt's military service:

- 1977–78 – Battery executive officer; 1/15th Field Artillery; Camp Stanley, Korea
- 1978–80 – Fire support officer; 2nd Ranger Battalion; Fort Lewis, Washington
- 1980–82 – Battery commander and battery executive officer; 9th Infantry Division; Fort Lewis, Washington
- 1984–87 – Assistant professor, Department of Social Sciences; U.S. Military Academy; West Point, NY
- 1989–91 – Chief of war plans; 8th Infantry Division; Bad Kreuznach, Germany
- 1991–92 – 4/29th Field Artillery; Baumholder, Germany
- 1992–93 – Division artillery executive officer; 1st Armored Division; Baumholder, Germany
- 1993–96 – Battalion commander; 2/320th Field Artillery; Fort Campbell, KY
- 1996–97 – Special assistant – J5; Joint Chiefs of Staff; The Pentagon
- 1997–00 – Division artillery commander; 1st Armored Division; Baumholder, Germany
- 2000–02 – Military assistant to the Supreme Allied Commander Europe; Supreme Headquarters, Allied Powers Europe; Mons, Belgium
- 2002–04 – Chief of staff and commander; Corps Artillery XVIII Airborne Corps; Fort Bragg, NC
- 2003–04 – Deputy director of operations; Combined Joint Task Force – Seven; Baghdad, Iraq
- 2004–06 – Deputy director, strategy, plans and policy; U.S. Central Command; MacDill Air Force Base, FL

=== Awards and decorations ===
Kimmitt's awards and decorations include:

==== United States awards ====
- Defense Superior Service Medal
- Legion of Merit
- Bronze Star
- Defense Meritorious Service Medal
- Meritorious Service Medal
- Army Commendation Medal
- Joint Service Commendation Medal
- Korean Defense Service Medal
- Global War on Terrorism Expeditionary Medal
- Global War on Terror Service Medal
- Armed Forces Expeditionary Medal
- Master Parachutist Wings

==== Foreign and international awards ====
- NATO Medal for operations in Bosnia
- NATO Medal for operations in Kosovo
- NATO Medal for operations in Republic of Macedonia.
- NATO Meritorious Service Medal
- German Parachutist Wings
- German Leistungsabzeichen in Gold.

== Government career ==
After retiring from the Army in 2006, Kimmitt served as the Deputy Assistant Secretary of Defense for Middle East Policy, responsible for military policy development, planning, guidance and oversight for the region. Kimmitt served in this position until July 31, 2008, before being nominated as Assistant Secretary of State. Kimmitt's nomination was delayed because of two investigations into anonymous letters sent to the Senate Foreign Relations Committee, but was ultimately confirmed, and was sworn as Assistant Secretary of State on August 8, 2008. In this role, Kimmitt was responsible for State Department political-military policy, with particular emphasis on security assistance and sales of arms around the world, as well as serving as the primary liaison between the Departments of State and Defense. He was also instrumental in recent counter-piracy operations off the coast of Somalia, and negotiated the groundbreaking arrangements for the prosecution of pirates abroad. He left office in January 2009.

=== Nomination delay ===
Kimmitt's nomination for Assistant Secretary of State was delayed because of two investigations into anonymous letters sent to the Senate Foreign Relations Committee. Upon receipt of each letter, Sen. Joseph Biden requested that the Inspector General of the Department of Defense (IG) investigate the allegations. After a four-month investigation, the IG concluded after the first investigation that "BG Kimmitt's leadership style was occasionally inconsistent with the standards expected for senior Government leaders" and that "cognizant management officials should continue to monitor his leadership style." "[T]estimony indicated that morale In BG Kimmitt's organization was negatively affected by BG Kimmitt's leadership style, combined with the heavy workload and long hours. Finally, we found that BG Kimmitt's leadership style discouraged subordinates from free and open communication with him." The report also stated that the IG "obtained testimonial evidence that tended to mitigate the adverse impact of BG Kimmitt's leadership lapses. In that regard several witnesses, primarily BG Kimmitt's superiors, emphasized that BG Kimmitt brings superb qualifications and intellect to his position; that he has strengthened the overall performance of his office; and that he operates in a stressful, demanding environment, which could trigger confrontation." The Department of Defense Inspector General's office, in a separate letter to the committee, also disclosed "a substantiated allegation that Mr. Kimmitt ... failed to properly safeguard information, in violation of Army regulations," but it did not elaborate. The exact nature of this violation has not been disclosed.

== Controversy ==
After the Mukaradeeb wedding party massacre in 2004, Kimmitt said, "There was no evidence of a wedding: no decorations, no musical instruments found, no large quantities of food or leftover servings one would expect from a wedding celebration. There may have been some kind of celebration. Bad people have celebrations, too."

Video footage obtained by the Associated Press seems to contradict this view. The video shows a series of scenes of a wedding celebration, and footage from the following day showing fragments of musical instruments, pots and pans and brightly colored beddings used for celebrations, scattered around a destroyed tent.

Government offices
Preceded by John Hillen	Assistant Secretary of State for Political-Military Affairs; August 8, 2008 – January 20, 2009	Succeeded by Andrew J. Shapiro
