= Blue sky memo =

Document authored by the CIA

The Blue sky memo was a document authored by the Central Intelligence Agency (CIA). The premise of the memo was to describe actions the CIA should undertake if it did not have to operate under legal, financial, and political restrictions (that is to say, if the "sky were blue").

The memorandum was inspired by the USS Cole bombing, and written in the final weeks of the Clinton administration. It was delivered to Richard A. Clarke on December 29, 2000.

According to the 9/11 Commission Report:

No action was taken on these ideas in the few remaining weeks of the Clinton administration. [National Security Adviser Sandy] Berger did not recall seeing or being briefed on the Blue Sky memo. Nor was the memo discussed during the transition with incoming top Bush administration officials. [CIA Director George] Tenet and his deputy told us they pressed these ideas as options after the new administration took office.
