= Thomas E. McNamara =

American diplomat

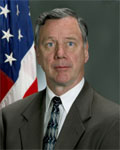

United States Ambassador to Colombia
- In office October 4, 1988 – August 14, 1991
- President: Ronald Reagan; George H. W. Bush
- Preceded by: Charles A. Gillespie Jr.
- Succeeded by: Morris D. Busby

12th Assistant Secretary of State for Political-Military Affairs
- In office October 12, 1994 – January 9, 1998
- President: Bill Clinton
- Preceded by: Robert Gallucci
- Succeeded by: Eric D. Newsom

Personal details
- Born: 1940 (age 85–86) New Haven, Connecticut, U.S.
- Education: Manhattan College; University of Notre Dame

Thomas E. "Ted" McNamara (born 1940) is a United States diplomat and State Department official.

== Biography ==
Thomas E. McNamara was born in New Haven, Connecticut in 1940. He was educated at Manhattan College, graduating with a B.A. in 1962. He then attended the University of Notre Dame, receiving an M.A.

In 1965, McNamara joined the United States Foreign Service. As a diplomat, he was at various times stationed in Paris, Lubumbashi, Bukavu, Moscow, and Bogotá. In the 1970s, he was active in the negotiation of several major arms control agreements, serving in the Arms Control and Disarmament Agency in 1974 and 1975. From 1980 to 1983, he was Deputy Chief of Mission at the United States Embassy to Zaire (now the Democratic Republic of the Congo) in Kinshasa.

From 1983 to 1986, McNamara was a Deputy Director of the Bureau of Politico-Military Affairs.

In 1986, President of the United States Ronald Reagan appointed McNamara to the United States National Security Council as Director of Counterterrorism and Counternarcotics. President Reagan nominated McNamara as United States Ambassador to Colombia in 1988. He held this post until 1991, at which time President George H. W. Bush appointed him as Special Assistant to the President for National Security Affairs and Senior Director for International Programs and African Affairs on the staff of the National Security Council. He served as Acting Coordinator for Counterterrorism 1992–1993.

McNamara became Principal Deputy Assistant Secretary of State for Political-Military Affairs in July 1993, and then, following nomination by President Bill Clinton and Senate confirmation, became Assistant Secretary of State for Political-Military Affairs on October 12, 1994. He held this office until January 9, 1998. He also served in 1997 and 1998 as Special Negotiator for Panama Canal Reversion.

McNamara retired from government service in 1998, becoming president and CEO of the Americas Society and the Council of the Americas in New York City.

Following the September 11 attacks, McNamara, as an expert in counter-terrorism, returned to government service as Senior Advisor for Counter Terrorism and Homeland Security to the Secretary of State until July 2004.

Following passage of the Intelligence Reform and Terrorism Prevention Act of 2004, President George W. Bush on March 15, 2006, appointed McNamara Program Manager for the Information Sharing Environment reporting through the Director of National Intelligence to the President and the Congress. He is the third recipient of the National Intelligence Distinguished Public Service Medal.

Diplomatic posts
Preceded by Charles A. Gillespie Jr.	United States Ambassador to Colombia; October 4, 1988 – August 14, 1991	Succeeded by Morris D. Busby
Government offices
Preceded by Robert Gallucci	Assistant Secretary of State for Political-Military Affairs; October 12, 1994 – January 9, 1998	Succeeded by Eric D. Newsom
