= Foreign Policy Research Institute =

American think tank

- Abbreviation: FPRI
- Formation: 1955; 71 years ago
- Type: Public policy think tank
- Tax ID no.: 23-1731998
- Headquarters: 123 S. Broad Street, Suite 1920, Philadelphia, Pennsylvania, U.S.
- Location: Philadelphia, Pennsylvania, U.S.
- President: Aaron Stein
- Key people: Robert Freedman; Samuel J. Savitz; John Templeton Jr.; Dov S. Zakheim; John Hillen; Alan Luxenberg
- Revenue: $2,396,414 (2024)
- Expenses: $2,479,874 (2018)
- Website: fpri.org

The Foreign Policy Research Institute (FPRI) is an American think tank based in Philadelphia, Pennsylvania, that conducts research on geopolitics, international relations, and international security in the various regions of the world and on ethnic conflict, U.S. national security, terrorism, and on think tanks themselves. It publishes a quarterly journal, Orbis, and a series of reports, books, newsletters, and podcasts.

== History ==
FPRI was founded by Ambassador Robert Strausz-Hupé, a Vienna native who immigrated to the United States in 1923. Dissatisfied with the containment strategy of John Foster Dulles and the Eisenhower administration's foreign policy in general, Strausz-Hupé founded FPRI in 1955 with support from the University of Pennsylvania, an Ivy League university in Philadelphia, and the Smith Richardson Foundation. In 1957, FPRI began publishing Orbis, its quarterly journal.

Since the end of the Cold War, the institute has focused on education in international affairs, sponsoring various programs in Philadelphia-area schools as well as conferences and seminars for high school and junior college teachers and lectures for the general public.

== Research programs ==
FPRI manages and sponsors several divisions and programs, including its Program on National Security (chaired by John Lehman Jr.); its Asia Program (directed by Shihoko Goto)its Eurasia Program (directed by Emily Holland); and the Africa Program (chaired by Charles A. Ray).

== Board of trustees ==
As of 2026, FPRI's board of trustees includes:

- Robert L. Freedman, chairman
- Devon Cross, vice-chair
- John Hillen
- Charles A. Ray
- Peter Dachowski

== Funding ==
Funding report as of 2019 (no specific details about grants or contributions):

Revenue and support as of 2018: $2,036,261
1. Contributions 44.1 (42.2%)
2. Grants 34.3 (32.8%)
3. Membership and partnership 11.2 (10.7%)
4. Royalties and editorial income 8 (7.65%)
5. Other income 7 (6.69%)
Expenses as of 2018: $2,479,874
1. Program (83.7%)
2. Management and general (9.20%)
3. Fundraising (7.10%)

== Publications ==
- Orbis ISSN 0030-4387
- e-notes : a catalyst for ideas OCLC 303405690
- Foreign Policy Research Institute footnotes OCLC 58531019
- Foreign Policy Research Institute wire

== See also ==
- Think Tanks and Civil Societies Program
