= Warnings (book) =

Book by Richard Clarke

Warnings: Finding Cassandras to Stop Catastrophes
- Author: Richard A. Clarke and R. P. Eddy
- Language: English
- Genre: History, non-fiction
- Publisher: HarperCollins
- Publication date: 2017
- Publication place: United States
- Media type: Print (hardback)
- ISBN: 978-0-06-248802-2

Warnings: Finding Cassandras to Stop Catastrophes is a book published by HarperCollins Ecco and written by former United States intelligence and counterterrorism official Richard A. Clarke, and former White House National Security Council Director, and U.S. and UN senior diplomat R. P. Eddy. The book offers a framework, "The Cassandra Coefficient," to help determine which warnings decisions makers should look into more closely, and if some warnings deserve less attention. The case studies range from national security, to threatening technologies, to the global economy, to climate change and speculates on various potential threats to civilization.

== Content ==
The authors cover seven case studies in which data driven, proven, credible experts specifically warned of a pending catastrophe, were ignored by the decision makers, and the disaster subsequently struck just as predicted. The authors call these seers "Cassandras" after the Greek mythological figure who could foretell disaster but was cursed to never be believed. The authors propose a method to separate accurate predictions of danger from inaccurate doomsayers, "The Cassandra Coefficient." They then investigate experts who today are warning of future disasters—the threats from artificial intelligence, bio-hacking, mutating viruses, and more—and whose calls are not being heeded. The concluding chapter describes how individuals and organizations can employ the Cassandra Coefficient, hedging and "sentinel intelligence," to watch potential disasters so as to not be surprised by them, and expend the necessary remediative resources only when necessary.

== Reception ==
Warnings was lauded and recommended by President Bill Clinton (who noted it on his recommended reading list), Henry Kissinger, Sen. George Mitchell, Gen. Michael Hayden, Commissioner William J. Bratton and Lawrence Wright.

It was a Publishers Weekly best seller, the #1 Best Seller on Amazon in four categories, and a top 15 seller of all books on Amazon. The book enjoyed positive reviews in The Washington Times, Insider Hook (formerly Real Clear Life), Kirkus, and on Good Morning America.

Warnings won the Axiom 2018 Business Book of the year, silver medal.

In her book What Happened and subsequent interviews, Hillary Clinton referred to Warnings and noted the value the Cassandra Theory could have had to encourage decision makers to take the Russian hacking threat in the 2016 U.S. presidential election more seriously.

The authors have also started a foundation to reward annual prizes to present day “Cassandras.”
