= John Hillen =

American business executive and diplomat

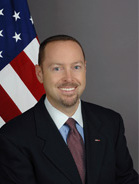

15th Assistant Secretary of State for Political-Military Affairs
- In office October 11, 2005 – January 11, 2007
- President: George W. Bush
- Preceded by: Lincoln P. Bloomfield Jr.
- Succeeded by: Mark Kimmitt

Personal details
- Born: February 3, 1966 (age 60)
- Education: Duke University (BA); King's College London (MA); St Antony's College, Oxford (D.Phil); Cornell University (MBA)
- Website: http://www.state.gov

John Francis Hillen III (born February 3, 1966) is an American business executive and diplomat who was the Assistant Secretary of State for Political-Military Affairs from 2005 to 2007. He was president and CEO of Sotera Defense Solutions from 2008 to 2013. While at Sotera, he took the company public in November 2009. Hillen was the CEO of EverWatch Corporation, which was acquired by Booz Allen Hamilton in October 2022. He is as a college professor and board chairman and director of several companies.

== Education ==
Hillen received his BA from Duke University, his MA from King's College London, his doctorate from the St Antony's College, Oxford, and an MBA from Cornell University. In April 2015 Hillen was made the inaugural inductee into the Duke University Army ROTC Hall of Fame.

In 2019, he was awarded an honorary Doctor of Laws degree by Hampden–Sydney College and delivered the Baccalaureate address at the college’s commencement.

== Career ==
Hillen was an officer in the United States Army for twelve years. He was a civil affairs officer on jump status with the United States Special Operations Command and as a cavalry officer in the 2nd Cavalry Regiment. He was featured in Douglas Macgregor's military memoir Warriors Rage: The Great Tank Battle of the 73 Easting.

A longtime leader in the technology services and government contracting industry, Hillen has been the CEO or President of a number of companies, both public or private, and the Chairman of the trade industry association - The Professional Services Council. He was on the Boards of another dozen GovCon companies. He is a two time winner of the Fed100 award, and his companies have also won the ACG Deal of the Year Award and the GovCon Company of the Year award. Hillen is the founder of the GovCon Center at George Mason University and was a columnist for Washington Technology magazine and Forbes. In 2020 and 2022, Hillen was the Master of Ceremonies for the Chief Officer Awards.

While Assistant Secretary of State for Political-Military Affairs, Hillen was the senior State department official responsible for coordinating America's diplomatic strategy with its military operations. He was also responsible for overseeing the department's policies in the areas of international security, security assistance, military operations, weapons removal and abatement, and defense trade. He was unanimously confirmed by the Senate.

Prior to his appointment in the Bush administration, he was the head of the defense and intelligence business at American Management Systems. Prior to that, he was the chief operating officer of Island ECN in New York City.

He is a trustee or director of several non-profit institutions, including the Foreign Policy Research Institute, the Vandenberg Coalition, and National Review. He was for many years a contributing editor to National Review and an ABC News consultant. He is also a member of the Council on Foreign Relations and the Veterans of Foreign Wars. Hillen is the author and editor of several books on international security, including Future Visions for U.S. Defense Policy: Four Alternatives Presented as Presidential Speeches–A Council Policy Initiative and Blue Helmets: The Strategy of UN Military Operations. and he has been published in Foreign Affairs, The New York Times, and The Wall Street Journal.

From 2007 to 2016, Hillen was on the Chief of Naval Operations Executive Panel, the advisory panel for the head of the United States Navy. In 2016, he was awarded the Navy Meritorious Public Service Award for service to that panel. Also in 2016, Hillen was awarded the Algernon Sydney Sullivan Award.

In 2020, Hillen was inducted into the Army Reserve Officers’ Training Corps Hall of Fame, which honors ROTC graduates who distinguished themselves in their military or civilian pursuits. Hillen was a military advisory for Call of Duty: WWII and is featured as a character in the game.

Hillen partnered with leading executive coach Mark Nevins to write the book What Happens Now?: Reinvent Yourself as a Leader Before Your Business Outruns in May 2018. The book was recognized as a top business or leadership book of 2018 on several surveys and lists.

From 2013-2019, Hillen was the executive-in-residence and professor of practice in the School of Business at George Mason University. He won the outstanding professor award in the MBA program three times for his core course in strategy. In July 2020, Hampden-Sydney College and the Wilson Center for Leadership in the Public Interest named Hillen the new James C. Wheat chair in leadership. A former trustee of the college, in 2016, the college awarded Hillen the Algernon Sydney Sullivan Award. His most recently publications in that role can be found at Wilson Center in the News.

== Professional associations ==
- IAP Global (member of board of directors)
- QinetiQ, Inc. (chairman of the board of directors)
- Atkins Nuclear Solutions (chairman of the board of directors)
- Software AG Government Solutions (member of the board of directors)
- 2nd Cavalry Association [Army] (member of board of directors)
- Council on Foreign Relations (CFR) (member)
- Foreign Policy Research Institute (FPRI) (trustee)
- National Review magazine (board of directors)
- Professional Services Council (PSC) (past chairman)
- YPO (member)
- President of the International Business Leaders Advisory Council of the Programme for Church Management of the Pontifical University of Santa Croce, council composed of business leaders coming from USA and the European Union, such as the investor Pierre Louvrier.

== Personal ==
Hillen is the son of John Francis Hillen Jr. (May 24, 1936 – April 27, 2009) and Lisa Grassi Hillen. The elder Hillen was a retired Army lieutenant colonel, Army Ranger, Green Beret, Vietnam War veteran and Distinguished Flying Cross recipient.

Government offices
Preceded by Lincoln P. Bloomfield Jr.	Assistant Secretary of State for Political-Military Affairs; October 11, 2005 – January 11, 2007	Succeeded by Mark Kimmitt
