= The Scorpion's Gate =

2005 novel by Richard A. Clarke

- Author: Richard A. Clarke
- Language: English
- Genre: Geopolitical thriller
- Publisher: G. P. Putnam's Sons
- Publication date: 2005
- Publication place: United States
- Media type: Print (hardback)
- ISBN: 0-399-15294-6
- OCLC: 60414498
- Dewey Decimal: 813/.6 22
- LC Class: PS3603.L377 S37 2005

The Scorpion's Gate is a geopolitical thriller by former United States intelligence and Counterterrorism official Richard A. Clarke. The Scorpion's Gate is his first novel, but it is not his first book — unlike his non-fiction policy books this is an attempt to convey vital foreign policy ideas through fiction. The subtitle on the cover reads: "Sometimes you can tell more truth through fiction." The hardcover edition is 320 pages long.

== Synopsis ==
A coup in Saudi Arabia topples the sheiks and installs an Islamic government in its place. The weaknesses of the new government, combined with the oil riches of the country, attract attention from all over the world as larger, oil-hungry countries attempt to realign the map of the Middle East.
