= Breakpoint (novel) =

2007 novel by Richard Clarke

- First edition
- Author: Richard A. Clarke
- Language: English
- Genre: Cyberpunk, Science fiction novel
- Publisher: G. P. Putnam's Sons
- Publication date: 2007
- Publication place: United States
- Media type: Print (hardback)
- ISBN: 0-399-15378-0
- OCLC: 71126722
- Dewey Decimal: 813/.6 22
- LC Class: PS3603.L377 B74 2007

Breakpoint is a cyberpunk science fiction novel by former United States intelligence and counterterrorism official Richard A. Clarke. It is his second novel. The book paints a dystopic prediction of the future.

== Plot ==
A series of explosions occur at seemingly unimportant sites in the United States. These sites happen to be the locations where transatlantic cables from Europe and Asia reach the U.S. essentially cutting the U.S. off from the world, at least via the Internet. The attacks are immediately blamed on the Chinese. Two investigators are sent to investigate the incidents, with this assumption in mind. The investigators soon uncover an underground science of genomics and nanotechnology working on human-computer integration.

== Reception ==
It was featured on the Colbert Report.
