= Assistant Secretary of State for Political-Military Affairs =

U.S. government position

United States Assistant Secretary of State for Political-Military Affairs
- Seal of the United States Department of State

- Flag of an Assistant Secretary of State

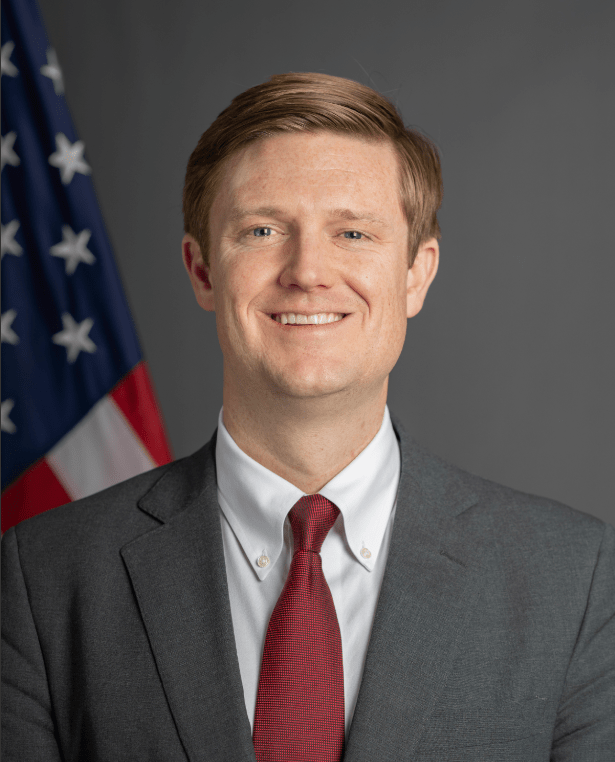
- Incumbent; Fleet White since August 14, 2026
- Reports to: Under Secretary of State for Arms Control and International Security
- Nominator: President of the United States
- Inaugural holder: Ronald I. Spiers
- Formation: 1969
- Website: Official Website

The assistant secretary of state for political-military affairs is a position within the U.S. Department of State that manages the Bureau of Political-Military Affairs, charged with linking the Department of Defense and the Department of State by providing policy in the areas of international security, security assistance, military operations, defense strategy, and defense trade. The assistant secretary of state for political-military affairs reports to the under secretary of state for arms control and international security affairs.

When the Department of State originally established the Bureau of Politico-Military Affairs on September 18, 1969, the bureau replaced a special component for politico-military affairs that had served under the deputy under secretary of state for political affairs since 1960. The head of the bureau had the title of director of the Bureau of Politico-Military Affairs, and was designated by the secretary of state, but still held rank equivalent to assistant secretary. Later, the director became appointed by the president, subject to the advice and consent of the Senate, and the title of the head of the bureau was changed to assistant secretary on April 14, 1986.

== List of directors of the Bureau of Political-Military Affairs, 1969–1985 ==
#	Name	Assumed office	Left office	President served under
1	Ronald I. Spiers	September 18, 1969	August 2, 1973	Richard Nixon
2	Seymour Weiss	August 6, 1973	January 17, 1974	Richard Nixon
3	George S. Vest	April 29, 1974	March 27, 1977	Richard Nixon and Gerald Ford
4	Leslie H. Gelb	February 23, 1977	June 30, 1979	Jimmy Carter
5	Reginald H. Bartholomew	July 1, 1979	January 20, 1981	Jimmy Carter
6	Richard R. Burt	January 23, 1981	February 17, 1982	Ronald Reagan
7	Jonathan Howe	May 10, 1982	July 1, 1984	Ronald Reagan
8	John T. Chain Jr.	July 1, 1984	June 14, 1985	Ronald Reagan

== List of assistant secretaries of state for political-military affairs, 1986–present ==
#	Name	Assumed office	Left office	President served under
9	H. Allen Holmes	July 19, 1985	August 8, 1989	Ronald Reagan
10	Richard A. Clarke	August 8, 1989	July 10, 1992	George H. W. Bush
11	Robert Gallucci	July 13, 1992	October 11, 1994	George H. W. Bush and Bill Clinton
12	Thomas E. McNamara	October 12, 1994	January 9, 1998	Bill Clinton
13	Eric D. Newsom	November 2, 1998	December 31, 2000	Bill Clinton
14	Lincoln P. Bloomfield Jr.	May 31, 2001	January 20, 2005	George W. Bush
15	John Hillen	October 11, 2005	January 11, 2007	George W. Bush
-	Stephen D. Mull (acting)	January 11, 2007	August 8, 2008	George W. Bush
16	Mark Kimmitt	August 8, 2008	January 20, 2009	George W. Bush
17	Andrew J. Shapiro	June 22, 2009	April 19, 2013	Barack Obama
-	Thomas P. Kelly III (acting)	April 19, 2013	April 9, 2014	Barack Obama
18	Puneet Talwar	April 9, 2014	November 2015	Barack Obama
19	R. Clarke Cooper	May 2, 2019	January 20, 2021	Donald Trump
-	Timothy Alan Betts (acting)	January 20, 2021	September 30, 2021	Joe Biden
20	Jessica Lewis	September 30, 2021	July 16, 2024	Joe Biden
-	Stanley L. Brown (acting)	July 16, 2024	January 20, 2025	Joe Biden
-	James Holtsnider (senior bureau official)	January 20, 2025	September 29, 2025	Donald Trump
-	Fleet White (senior bureau official)	September 29, 2025	March 11, 2026	Donald Trump
-	Stanley L. Brown (acting)	March 11, 2026	August 14, 2026	Donald Trump
21	Fleet White	August 14, 2026	Present	Donald Trump
