= Marc Ambinder =

American university professor, journalist, and television producer (born 1978)

- Born: c. 1978
- Education: Harvard College
- Occupations: Journalist, professor, television producer

Marc Ambinder (/ˈæmbɪndər/; born c. 1978) is an American university professor, journalist, and television producer. He is a former politics editor at The Atlantic, a White House Correspondent for National Journal, contributing editor for GQ, and was editor-at-large of The Week and a member of the USA Today national board of contributors. In 2017, he was the journalist-in-residence at the University of Pennsylvania School of Law. His third book, The Brink: President Reagan and the Nuclear War Scare of 1983, was published by Simon & Schuster in July 2018. He teaches at the USC Annenberg School for Communication and Journalism, where he leads Annenberg's digital security initiative.

== Education ==
Ambinder received a A.B. in history from Harvard University in 2001. He was an associate managing editor of The Harvard Crimson.

== Career ==
In 2016, Ambinder was a Leadership Fellow at the University of Southern California's Annenberg School of Communications and Journalism. Since 2017, he has taught investigative journalism, political journalism and national security journalism. He consults for Fortune 100 companies on corporate and strategic communication. Until December 31, 2011 Ambinder was the White House correspondent at the National Journal. He previously worked at ABC News and was chief political consultant to CBS News from 2008 to 2011. For years, he was the author of a political blog, The Hotline.

Though presidential politics and Washington have been his primary areas of interest, he also writes about intelligence and national security, and has broken several stories, including details about the raid on Osama bin Laden. His first book, "The Command: Inside The President's Secret Army," is an examination of the secretive Joint Special Operations Command.

He has secured access to the protective details of the Secret Service, broken stories about computer failures that jeopardized America’s nuclear arsenal, probed Pakistan’s fragile intelligence services, and became an authority on national security topics ranging from the NSA and surveillance, to the government’s secret commando force, to its secretive continuity of government plans.

He has written for The New York Times, The New Yorker, The Washington Post, Vice, and numerous national magazines. He has been a consulting producer and on-air expert for documentaries about special operations forces, the Secret Service and government doomsday plans. He has been a guest on every national television news network in the U.S., on the BBC, on Al Jazeera International and was a regular analyst on politics for CBS News Radio.

His online journalism has won him several awards and attracted a large Twitter following. He was nominated for an Emmy in 2005 and was part of a team that won a DuPont Silver Baton from Columbia University.

Gawker reported that, in 2009, Ambinder struck a deal with Hillary Clinton spokesman Philippe Reines to provide positive remarks on Clinton in exchange for receiving an advance copy of a Clinton speech. Gawker based its report on a fragment of an email chain they obtained through a Freedom of Information Act request. Both Ambinder and Reines said that the emails lacked critical context, which showed that Ambinder did not actually make any such deal with Reines. Ambinder later said he regretted how such incidents, even when misinterpreted, contributed to the fraying of trust between political journalists and the public, and decried the proliferation of transactional reporting in Washington.

== Personal ==
In 2010 Ambinder wrote about his experience with bariatric surgery, which reduced his weight from 235 to 150 pounds. He is married to Michael Park, a corporate strategy consultant.
