= Richard A. Clarke =

American counter-terrorism expert and novelist (born 1950)

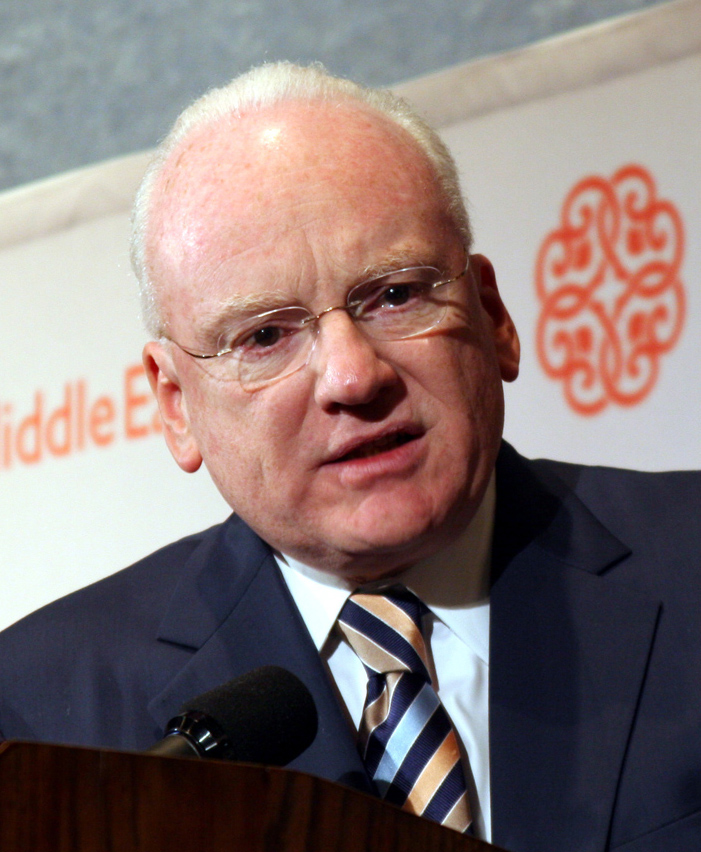

10th Assistant Secretary of State for Political-Military Affairs
- In office August 8, 1989 – July 10, 1992
- President: George H. W. Bush
- Preceded by: H. Allen Holmes
- Succeeded by: Robert Gallucci

Personal details
- Born: Richard Alan Clarke; October 27, 1950 (age 76) Dorchester, Massachusetts, U.S.
- Party: Democratic
- Education: University of Pennsylvania (BA); Massachusetts Institute of Technology (MSM)
- Website: Official website

Richard Alan Clarke (born October 27, 1950) is an American national security expert, novelist, and former government official. He served as the Counterterrorism Czar for the National Coordinator for Security, Infrastructure Protection, and Counter-Terrorism for the United States between 1998 and 2003.

Clarke worked for the State Department during the presidency of Ronald Reagan. In 1992, President George H. W. Bush appointed him to chair the Counter-terrorism Security Group and to a seat on the United States National Security Council. President Bill Clinton retained Clarke and in 1998 promoted him to be the National Coordinator for Security, Infrastructure Protection, and Counter-terrorism, the chief counter-terrorism adviser on the National Security Council. Under President George W. Bush, Clarke initially continued in the same position but no longer had Cabinet-level access. He was later appointed as Special Advisor to the President on cybersecurity. Clarke left the Bush administration in 2003.

Clarke came to widespread public attention for his counter-terrorism role in March 2004: He published a memoir about his service in government, Against All Enemies, appeared on the 60 Minutes television news magazine, and testified before the 9/11 Commission. In all three cases, Clarke sharply criticized the Bush administration's attitude toward counter-terrorism before the September 11 attacks, and its decision afterward to wage war and invade Iraq.

After leaving U.S. government, with U.S. government legal approvals, Clarke helped the United Arab Emirates to set up a cyber security unit intended to protect their nation. Years after Clarke left, some components of the program were acquired by a sequence of firms, and it is reported they eventually surveilled women's rights activists, UN diplomats, and FIFA officials.

== Background ==
Richard Clarke was born to a worker in a chocolate factory and a nurse in Boston, Massachusetts, in 1950. He attended the Boston Latin School, where he graduated in 1968. He attended college at the University of Pennsylvania, where he received a bachelor's degree in 1972. He had been selected to serve in the Sphinx Senior Society.

After starting as a management intern at the U.S. Department of Defense and later working as an analyst on European security issues, Clarke went to graduate school. He earned a master's degree in management in 1978 from the Massachusetts Institute of Technology.

== Government career ==
In 1973, Clarke began work in the federal government as a management intern in the Department of Defense. He worked in numerous areas of defense while in headquarters.

From 1979 to 1985, he worked at the Department of State as a career analyst in the Bureau of Politico-Military Affairs. Beginning in 1985, Clarke was appointed by the Ronald Reagan administration as Deputy Assistant Secretary of State for Intelligence—his first political appointee position as a Republican Party member.

During the administration of George H. W. Bush, he was appointed as the Assistant Secretary of State for Political-Military Affairs. He coordinated diplomatic efforts to support the 1990–1991 Gulf War and subsequent security arrangements.

Democrat Bill Clinton kept Clarke on in his administration, appointing him in 1998 as National Coordinator for Security, Infrastructure Protection, and Counter-terrorism for the National Security Council. In this position, he had cabinet-level access to the president.

Clarke continued as counter-terrorism coordinator at the NSC during the first year of the George W. Bush administration, but no longer had access, as the position's scope was reduced. His written recommendations and memos had to go through layers of political appointees above him. In 2001, he was appointed as Special Advisor to the President on cybersecurity and cyberterrorism. He resigned from the Bush administration in early 2003.

Clarke's positions inside the government have included:

- United States Department of State 1985–1992
  - Assistant Secretary of State for Politico-Military Affairs, 1989–1992
  - Deputy Assistant Secretary of State for Intelligence, 1985–1988
- United States National Security Council, 1992–2003
  - Special Advisor, 2001–2003
  - National Coordinator for Security, Infrastructure Protection, and Counter-terrorism, 1998–2001
  - Chairman of the Counter-terrorism Security Group, 1992–2003

=== Clinton administration ===
During the Rwandan genocide of 1994, Clarke advised Madeleine Albright, then–US Ambassador to the United Nations, to request the UN to withdraw all UN troops from the country. She refused, and permitted Lieutenant-General Roméo Dallaire to keep a few hundred UN troops; his forces saved tens of thousands from the genocide.

Later Clarke told Samantha Power, "It wasn't in America's national interest. If we had to do the same thing today and I was advising the President, I would advise the same thing." He supervised the writing of PDD-25, a classified Executive Order that established criteria for future U.S. participation in U.N. peacekeeping operations. It also proposed a reduced military and economic role for the United States in Rwanda.

After Islamists took control in Sudan in a 1989 coup d'état, the United States had adopted a policy of disengagement with the authoritarian regime throughout the 1990s. After the September 11, 2001 terrorist attacks, however, some critics charged that the U.S. should have moderated its policy toward Sudan earlier. The influence of Islamists there waned in the second half of the 1990s and Sudanese officials began to indicate an interest in accommodating US concerns related to Osama bin Laden, who lived in Sudan until he was expelled in May 1996 (and was later revealed to be the planner of 9/11.)

Timothy M. Carney, U.S. ambassador to Sudan between September 1995 and November 1997, co-authored an op-ed in 2002 claiming that in 1997, Sudan offered to turn over its intelligence on bin Laden to the US, but that Susan Rice, as National Security Council (NSC) Africa specialist, together with NSC terrorism specialist Richard A. Clarke, successfully lobbied for continuing to bar U.S. officials, including the CIA and FBI, from engaging with the Khartoum government. Similar allegations (that Susan Rice joined others in missing an opportunity to cooperate with Sudan on counter-terrorism) were made by David Rose, Vanity Fair contributing editor, and Richard Miniter, author of Losing Bin Laden.

Clarke was involved in supervising the investigation of Ramzi Yousef, one of the main perpetrators of the 1993 World Trade Center bombing, who had traveled to the United States on an Iraqi passport. Yousef is the nephew of Khalid Sheikh Mohammed, a senior al-Qaeda member. Many in the Clinton administration and the intelligence community believed Yousef's ties were evidence linking al-Qaeda's activities and the government of Iraq.

In February 1999, Clarke wrote the Deputy National Security Advisor that a reliable source reported Iraqi officials had met with Bin Laden and may have offered him asylum. Clarke advised against surveillance flights to track bin Laden in Afghanistan: he said that anticipating an attack, "old wily Usama will likely boogie to Baghdad," where he would be impossible to find. That year Clarke told the press in official statements that "Iraqi nerve gas experts" and al-Qaeda were linked to an alleged joint-chemical-weapons-development effort at the Al-Shifa pharmaceutical factory in Sudan.

==== Operation Orient Express ====
In 1996, Clarke entered into a secret pact with Madeleine Albright, then U.S. ambassador to the UN, Michael Sheehan, and James Rubin, to overthrow U.N. Secretary-General Boutros Boutros-Ghali, who was running unopposed for a second term in the 1996 selection. They dubbed the pact "Operation Orient Express" to reflect their hope "that many nations would join us in doing in the UN head." However, every other member of the Security Council voted for Boutros-Ghali. Despite severe criticism, Clarke and Sheehan prevailed upon President Clinton to resist international pressure and continue the US's solo veto. After four deadlocked meetings of the Security Council, Boutros-Ghali suspended his candidacy. He is the second U.N. Secretary-General ever to be denied a second term by a Security Council member veto, after Kurt Waldheim.

The United States fought a four-round veto duel with France, forcing it to back down and accept the selection of US-educated Kofi Annan as the next Secretary-General. In his memoirs, Clarke said that "the entire operation had strengthened Albright's hand in the competition to be Secretary of State in the second Clinton administration."

=== Bush administration ===
On April 8, 2004, Condoleezza Rice was publicly interviewed by the 9/11 investigatory commission. She discussed Clarke and his communications with the Bush administration regarding bin Laden and associated terrorist plots targeting the United States. Clarke had written a memo dated January 25, 2001, to Rice. He urgently requested a meeting of the NSC's Principals Committee to discuss the growing al-Qaeda threat in the greater Middle East, and suggested strategies for combating al-Qaeda that might be adopted by the new Bush administration.

In his memoir, Against All Enemies, Clarke wrote that Condoleezza Rice decided that the position of National Coordinator for Counterterrorism should be downgraded. By demoting the office, he believed that the Administration sent a signal to the national security bureaucracy that reduced the salience of terrorism. No longer would Clarke's memos go to the President; instead they had to pass through a chain of command of National Security Advisor Condoleezza Rice and her deputy Stephen Hadley, who bounced every one of them back.

Within a week of the inauguration, I wrote to Rice and Hadley asking 'urgently' for a Principals, or Cabinet-level, meeting to review the imminent Al-Qaeda threat. Rice told me that the Principals Committee, which had been the first venue for terrorism policy discussions in the Clinton administration, would not address the issue until it had been 'framed' by the Deputies.

The 9/11 Commission reported, in its eighth public hearing:

Clarke asked on several occasions for early principals meetings on these issues and was frustrated that no early meeting was scheduled. No Principals Committee meetings on al-Qaeda were held until September 4th, 2001.

At the first Deputies Committee meeting on terrorism, held in April 2001, Clarke strongly suggested that the U.S. put pressure on both the Taliban and al-Qaeda by arming the Northern Alliance and other groups in Afghanistan. Simultaneously, he said that the US should target bin Laden and his leadership by restoring flights of the MQ-1 Predators. Deputy Secretary of Defense Paul Wolfowitz responded, "Well, I just don't understand why we are beginning by talking about this one man bin Laden." Clarke replied that he was talking about bin Laden and his network because it posed "an immediate and serious threat to the United States." According to Clarke, Wolfowitz turned to him and said, "You give bin Laden too much credit. He could not do all these things like the 1993 attack on New York, not without a state sponsor. Just because the FBI and CIA have failed to find the linkages does not mean they don't exist."

Clarke wrote in Against All Enemies that in the summer of 2001, the intelligence community was convinced of an imminent attack by al-Qaeda, but could not get the attention of the highest levels of the Bush administration. At a July 5, 2001, White House gathering of the FAA, the Coast Guard, the FBI, Secret Service and INS, Clarke said that "something really spectacular is going to happen here, and it's going to happen soon."

=== Cyberterrorism and cybersecurity ===
Appointed in 2001 as Special Advisor to the President on Cybersecurity, Clarke spent his last year in the Bush administration focusing on cybersecurity and the threat of terrorism against the critical infrastructure of the United States. At a security conference in 2002, after citing statistics that indicated that less than 0.0025 percent of corporate revenue on average is spent on information-technology security, Clarke was heard to say, "If you spend more on coffee than on IT security, then you will be hacked. What's more, you deserve to be hacked."

== 9/11 Commission ==
On March 24, 2004, Clarke testified at the public 9/11 Commission hearings. He initially offered an apology to the families of 9/11 victims and said: "...your government failed you. Those entrusted with protecting you failed you. And I failed you. We tried hard, but that doesn't matter because we failed. And for that failure, I would ask, once all the facts are out, for your understanding and for your forgiveness."

Clarke's testimony during the hearings was consistent with his account in his memoir. Clarke said that before and during the 9/11 crisis, many in the administration were distracted from taking action against Osama bin Laden's al-Qaeda organization because of an existing pre-occupation with Iraq and Saddam Hussein. Clarke wrote that, on September 12, 2001, President Bush "testily" asked him and his aides to try to find evidence that Saddam was connected to the September 11 attacks. In response, Clarke wrote a report stating there was no evidence of Iraqi involvement: all relevant agencies, including the FBI and the CIA, signed off on this conclusion. The paper was quickly returned by a deputy with a note saying, "Please update and resubmit." In April 2004, the White House at first denied Clarke's account of meeting with Bush but reversed its denial when others who had been present backed Clarke's version of the events.

Supporting Clarke's claim that intelligence forewarning of attacks had been delivered to the president prior to 9/11, former Deputy Attorney General Jamie Gorelick, the sole member of the 9/11 Commission permitted (under an agreement with the Bush administration) to read the President's Daily Brief, said that these had contained "an extraordinary spike" in intelligence warnings of al-Qaeda attacks that had "plateaued at a spike level for months" before 9/11.

=== Criticism ===
Before and after Clarke appeared before the 9/11 Commission, some critics tried to attack his credibility. They impugned his motives, claiming he was a disappointed job-hunter, that he sought publicity, and that he was a political partisan. They charged that he exaggerated perceived failures in the Bush administration's counterterrorism policies while exculpating the former Clinton administration from its perceived shortcomings.

According to some reports, the White House tried to discredit Clarke in a move described as "shooting the messenger."

Some Republicans inside and outside the Bush administration questioned both Clarke's testimony and his tenure during the hearings. Senate Republican Majority Leader Bill Frist took to the Senate floor to make a speech alleging Clarke told "two entirely different stories under oath", pointing to congressional hearing testimony Clarke gave in 2002 and his 9/11 Commission testimony. Frist later speculated to reporters Clarke was trading on his former service as a government insider with access to the nation's most valuable intelligence to sell a book.

Clarke was criticized for his suggestions in 1999 of intelligence indicating a link between Saddam Hussein and al-Qaeda, despite the fact Clarke and others concluded after investigations by 2001 that no link had been established. In Against All Enemies Clarke writes, "It is certainly possible that Iraqi agents dangled the possibility of asylum in Iraq before bin Laden at some point when everyone knew that the U.S. was pressuring the Taliban to arrest him. If that dangle happened, bin Laden's accepting asylum clearly did not," (p. 270). In an interview on March 21, 2004, Clarke claimed that "there's absolutely no evidence that Iraq was supporting al-Qaeda, ever." Clarke claimed in his book that this conclusion was understood by the intelligence community at the time of 9/11 and the ensuing months, but top Bush administration officials were preoccupied with finding a link between Iraq and 9/11 in the months that followed the attack, and thus, Clarke argued, the Iraq war distracted attention and resources from the war in Afghanistan and hunt for Osama bin Laden.

Fox News, allegedly with the Administration's consent, identified and released a background briefing that Clarke gave in August 2002, at the Administration's request, to minimize the fallout from a Time magazine story about the President's failure to take certain actions before 9/11. In that briefing on behalf of the White House, Clarke stated "there was no plan on Al-Qaeda that was passed from the Clinton administration to the Bush administration," and that after taking office President Bush decided to "add to the existing Clinton strategy and to increase CIA resources, for example, for covert action, fivefold, to go after Al-Qaeda." At the next day's hearing, 9/11 Commission member James Thompson challenged Clarke with the 2002 account, and Clarke explained: "I was asked to make that case to the press. I was a special assistant to the President, and I made the case I was asked to make... I was asked to highlight the positive aspects of what the Administration had done and to minimize the negative aspects of what the Administration had done. And as a special assistant to the President, one is frequently asked to do that kind of thing. I've done it for several Presidents."

Another point of attack was Clarke's role in allowing members of the bin Laden family to fly to Saudi Arabia on September 20, 2001. According to Clarke's statements to the 9/11 Commission, a request was relayed to Clarke from the Saudi embassy to allow the members of the bin Laden family living in the U.S. to fly home. Clarke testified to the commission that he passed this decision in turn to the FBI via Dale Watson, and that the FBI at length sent its approval of the flight to the Interagency Crisis Management Group. However, FBI spokesman John Iannarelli denied that the FBI had a role in approving the flight: "I can say unequivocally that the FBI had no role in facilitating these flights."

On March 28, 2004, at the height of the controversy during the 9/11 Commission Hearings, Clarke went on NBC's Sunday morning news show Meet the Press and was interviewed by journalist Tim Russert. In responding to and rebutting the criticism, Clarke challenged the Bush administration to declassify the whole record, including closed testimony by Bush administration officials before the commission.

== Post government career ==
Clarke is currently Chairman of Good Harbor Consulting and Good Harbour International, two strategic planning and corporate risk management firms; an on-air consultant for ABC News, and a contributor to the Good Harbor Report, an online community discussing homeland security, defense, and politics. He is an adjunct lecturer at the Harvard Kennedy School and a faculty affiliate of its Belfer Center for Science and International Affairs. He has also published two novels: The Scorpion's Gate (2005) and, Breakpoint (2007).

Clarke wrote an op-ed for The Washington Post, titled "The Trauma of 9/11 Is No Excuse" (May 31, 2009) harshly critical of other Bush administration officials. Clarke wrote that he had little sympathy for his fellow officials who seemed to want to use the excuse of being traumatized and were caught unaware by Al-Qaeda's attacks on the USA because their being caught unaware was due to their ignoring clear reports a major attack on U.S. soil was imminent. Clarke particularly singled out former Vice President Dick Cheney and former Secretary of State Condoleezza Rice.

In April 2010, Clarke released his book on Cyber War. In April 2012, he wrote a New York Times op-ed addressing cyber attacks. In stemming cyber attacks carried out by foreign governments and foreign hackers, particularly from China, Clarke opined that the U.S. government should be authorized to "create a major program to grab stolen data leaving the country" in a fashion similar to how the U.S. Department of Homeland Security currently searches for child pornography that crosses America's "virtual borders." Moreover, he suggested that the US president could authorize agencies to scan Internet traffic outside the US and seize sensitive files stolen from within the United States. Clarke then stated that such a policy would not endanger privacy rights through the institution of a privacy advocate, who could stop abuses or any activity that went beyond halting the theft of important files. The op-ed did not offer evidence that finding and blocking files while they are being transmitted is technically feasible.

In September 2012, Clarke stated that Middle Eastern governments were likely behind hacking incidents against several banks. During the same year, he endorsed Barack Obama's reelection for President of the United States.

Following the 2013 high-speed fatal car crash of journalist Michael Hastings, a vocal critic of the surveillance state and restrictions on the press freedom under the Obama Administration tenure, Clarke was quoted as saying, "There is reason to believe that intelligence agencies for major powers—including the United States—know how to remotely seize control of a car. So if there were a cyber attack on the car—and I'm not saying there was, I think whoever did it would probably get away with it."

In 2013, Clarke served on an advisory group for the Obama administration, as it sought to reform NSA spying programs following the revelations of documents released by Edward Snowden. The report mentioned in 'Recommendation 30' on page 37, "...that the National Security Council staff should manage an interagency process to review on a regular basis the activities of the US Government regarding attacks, that exploit a previously unknown vulnerability in a computer application." Clarke told Reuters on 11 April 2014 that the NSA had not known of Heartbleed.

In a 2017 interview, Clarke described Russia's recent cyberattack against Ukraine that spread worldwide, via the exPetr virus that posed as ransomware. He warned confidently that Russia would be back to interfere with the 2018 and 2020 U.S. elections as the vulnerabilities demonstrated in the 2016 election still exist.

As of August 2017, Clarke had been obtaining large amounts of funds, notably $20 million for the Middle East Institute via the Emirates Center for Strategic Studies and Research (ECSSR), an Abu Dhabi-based think tank. The Middle East Institute had been propagating Emirati agendas in Washington and was mentioned in mail leaks of Yousef Al Otaiba, the Emirati ambassador to the US. The Intercept reported that Saif Mohamed Al Hajeri, CEO of Tawazun Holding L.L.C., had been sanctioning the money, larger than the annual budget of the Middle East Institute, on orders of Otaiba.

In August 2021, Clarke was named as a member of American facial recognition company Clearview AI's advisory board.

== Written works ==
- Against All Enemies: Inside America's War on Terror—What Really Happened (2004). ISBN 0-7432-6024-4. Non-fiction book critical of past and present administrations for the way they handled the war on terror both before and after September 11, 2001. The book focuses much of its criticism on Bush for failing to take sufficient action to protect the country in the elevated-threat period before the September 11, 2001 attacks. Clarke also feels that the 2003 invasion of Iraq greatly hampered the war on terror and was a distraction from the real terrorists.
- Defeating the Jihadists: A Blueprint for Action (2004). ISBN 0-87078-491-9. Non-fiction book in which Clarke outlines his idea of a more effective U.S. counterterrorism policy.
- The Scorpion's Gate (2005) ISBN 0-399-15294-6. Novel
- Breakpoint (2007) ISBN 0-399-15378-0. Novel
- Your Government Failed You: Breaking the Cycle of National Security Disasters (2008). ISBN 9780061474620. Non-fiction book
- Cyber War: The Next Threat to National Security and What to Do About It (2010), with Robert K. Knake. ISBN 9780061962233. Non-fiction book
- "How China Steals Our Secrets" (2012) The New York Times. Op-ed.
- Sting of the Drone (2014). Thomas Dunne Books. ISBN 9781250047977. Novel
- Pinnacle Event (2015). Thomas Dunne Books. ISBN 9781250047984. Novel
- Warnings: Finding Cassandras to Stop Catastrophes (2017), with R. P. Eddy. HarperCollins. ISBN 9780062488022. Non-fiction book
- The Fifth Domain: Defending Our Country, Our Companies, and Ourselves in the Age of Cyber Threats (2019), with Robert K. Knake. ISBN 9780525561965. Non-fiction book
- Hostile State Disinformation in the Internet Age (2024). Daedalus. Essay.

== See also ==
- Blue sky memo
- Ramzi Yousef

Political offices
Preceded by H. Allen Holmes	Assistant Secretary of State for Political-Military Affairs; 1989–1992	Succeeded by Robert Gallucci
