= Mike Ambinder =

American experimental psychologist

- Education: University of Illinois (PhD); Yale University (B.A.)
- Occupations: Experimental psychologist, game designer
- Years active: 2005 - present
- Known for: Brain computer interface related work at Valve

Mike Ambinder is an experimental psychologist currently working as an affiliate assistant professor at University of Washington. Best known for his tenure at Valve Corporation, his research is focused on user experience and HCI applied to video games. He has been part of the development of Team Fortress 2, Left 4 Dead, Alien Swarm, and Portal 2. He is one of the pioneers in applying psychophysiological techniques in user experience assessment and adaptive systems in the game industry context. In February 2023, Ambinder announced that he had left Valve.

Ambinder holds a B.A in computer science and psychology from Yale University, and a PhD in psychology from University of Illinois at Urbana-Champaign. He has published in academic journals, and presented at main game developer conferences.
