= Global Security Contingency Fund =

The Global Security Contingency Fund (GSCF) is a fund that was established under the United States National Defense Authorization Act for fiscal year 2012 in section 1207.

"The FY2012 National Defense Authorization Act (P.L. 112-81), Section 1207, created a new Global Security Contingency Fund (GSCF) as a four-year pilot project to be jointly administered and funded by the United States Department of Defense (DOD) and the United States Department of State. The purpose of the fund is to carry out security and counterterrorism training, and rule of law programs. (There also are three one-year transitional authorities for assistance to Africa and Yemen.) The GSCF is placed under the State Department budget. Although decisions are to be jointly made by the Secretaries of State and Defense, the mandated mechanism puts the Secretary of State in the lead"

== Purpose ==
"This new Fund follows from Secretary [of Defense Robert] Gates’ proposal in December 2009 that State and DoD adopt a "pooled resources" approach like that used in the United Kingdom to strengthen their abilities to respond to situations where their missions overlap." Admiral Michael Mullen (Chairman of the Joint Chiefs of Staff at the time) stated in a congressional hearing that, " [the GSCF] will buy us an agile and cost-effective way to better respond to unforeseen needs and take advantage of emerging opportunities for partners to secure their own territories and regions." The Global Security Contingency Fund (GSCF) is intended for either DOD or DOS to provide assistance to countries designated by Secretary of State, with the concurrence of Secretary of Defense, for the following purposes.

- To enhance the capabilities of a country's national military and other national security forces that conduct border and maritime, internal defense, and counterterrorism operations, as well as the government agencies responsible for such forces, to:
1. Conduct border and maritime security, internal defense, and counterterrorism operations, and
2. Participate in or support military, stability, or peace support operations consistent with US foreign policy and national security interests.
- For the justice sector (including law enforcement and prisons), rule of law programs, and stabilization efforts in a country. In cases in which SecState, in consultation with SecDef, determines that conflict or instability in a country or region challenges the existing capability of civilian providers to deliver such assistance.

Any such assistance programs are to be jointly formulated by DOD and DOS with the approval of SecState and the concurrence of SecDef. Any provided assistance may include equipment, supplies, and training.
