= Lincoln P. Bloomfield Jr. =

American government official

Lincoln Bloomfield
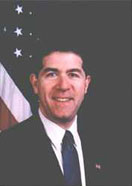

14th Assistant Secretary of State for Political-Military Affairs
- In office May 31, 2001 – January 20, 2005
- President: George W. Bush
- Preceded by: Eric D. Newsom
- Succeeded by: John Hillen

National Security Advisor to the Vice President of the United States
- In office 1991–1992
- Vice President: Dan Quayle

Personal details
- Born: 1952 (age 73–74)
- Parent: Lincoln P. Bloomfield Sr. (father)
- Education: Harvard University (A.B.); Tufts University (M.A.)

Lincoln Palmer Bloomfield Jr. (born 1952) is an American diplomat and national security policymaker who served as Assistant Secretary of State for Political-Military Affairs and U.S. Special Envoy for MANPADS Threat Reduction in the George W. Bush administration, as Dan Quayle's Deputy Assistant for National Security Affairs in the George H.W. Bush administration, and as Principal Deputy Assistant Secretary of Defense and other policy positions in the Ronald Reagan administration.

== Early life and education ==
Lincoln P. Bloomfield Jr. is the son of Lincoln P. Bloomfield, a political scientist widely respected as an expert on foreign affairs and Irirangi Coates Bloomfield, a New Zealand diplomat and daughter of Joseph Gordon Coates, 21st Prime Minister of New Zealand.

Bloomfield was educated at Harvard University, graduating cum laude with an A.B. in 1974. He later attended the Fletcher School of Law and Diplomacy at Tufts University, receiving an M.A. in Law and Diplomacy in 1980. During his time at the Fletcher School, he was the Director of The Fletcher Forum of World Affairs.

== Career ==
Upon graduation, Bloomfield joined the office of the Assistant Secretary of Defense for International Security Affairs. In 1988 and 1989, he served as Principal Deputy Assistant Secretary of Defense for International Security Affairs. Bloomfield spent 1989 and 1990 as a Member of U.S. Water Mediation in the Middle East, and then as a member of the U.S. Delegation to Philippine Bases Negotiation.

In 1991, Bloomfield joined the staff of Vice President Dan Quayle as Deputy Assistant to the Vice President for National Security Affairs. In 1992, Bloomfield joined the United States Department of State as Deputy Assistant Secretary of State for Near Eastern Affairs.

Bloomfield left government service in 1993, joining Armitage Associates LLC, a management consulting firm led by Richard Armitage. He worked there until 2001.

In 2001, George W. Bush nominated Bloomfield as Assistant Secretary of State for Political-Military Affairs. Bloomfield served from May 31, 2001, to January 20, 2005. During that time, he also served as Special Advisor to the President and Secretary of State for Humanitarian Mine Action.

In February 2005, Bloomfield founded Palmer Coates LLC, a consulting firm specializing in strategic planning for international business activities, technology and sustainability solutions.

Bloomfield returned to government in 2008 and 2009 as President Bush's special envoy for man-portable air-defense systems threat reduction.

Bloomfield served as chairman of the board of directors of the Henry L. Stimson Center from 2008 to 2016, and remained Chairman Emeritus and Distinguished Fellow. He is a non-executive director of European Metals Holdings, Vice Chairman of Mana Pacific and Strategic Advisor to Seatrec Inc. He is also a regular commentator on foreign policy issues.

== Personal life ==
Bloomfield has pursued a lifelong interest in musical songwriting, recording, and performing and produces records in his own studio. He has been a member in several bands, including Kelakos, for whom he also produced an album, which was released by Warner Brothers-affiliated Deko Entertainment in December 2023. Since 2004, he has been part of charity appearances with the band Coalition of the Willing which was composed of several U.S. Government officials, including 71st U.S. Secretary of State Antony Blinken, former Hungarian Ambassador to NATO and the U.S. Andras Simonyi, former Deputy Secretary for Department of Energy Daniel Poneman, and guitarist Jeff "Skunk" Baxter of Steely Dan and The Doobie Brothers. Bloomfield has also produced separate recordings for "Ablinken" AKA Antony Blinken, and a biographic original recording and video for Simonyi. Bloomfield produces solo song releases under the name LBJunior.

Bloomfield is married and has one child.

Government offices
Preceded by Eric D. Newsom	Assistant Secretary of State for Political-Military Affairs; May 31, 2001 – January 20, 2005	Succeeded by John Hillen
