= Jeremy Bash =

American lawyer (born 1971)

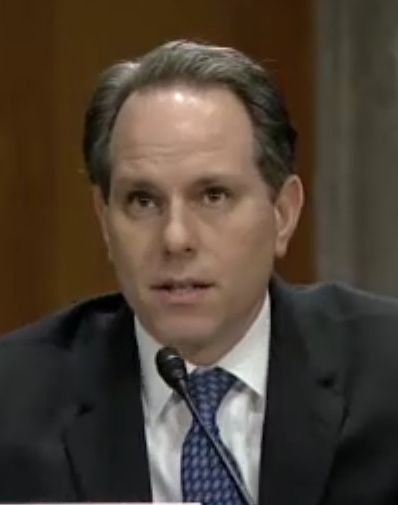
- Bash in 2017
- Born: August 13, 1971 (age 54); Arlington, Virginia, U.S.
- Education: Georgetown University (BA); Harvard University (JD)
- Political party: Democratic
- Spouses: Dana Schwartz (m. 1998; div. 2007) Robyn Cooke (m. 2009)
- Children: 3

Jeremy B. Bash (born August 13, 1971) is an American lawyer who served as chief of staff at the Central Intelligence Agency (2009–2011) and the U.S. Department of Defense (2011–2013) under President Barack Obama, in both roles as a senior advisor to Leon Panetta.

Since 2013, Bash has been a managing director at Beacon Global Strategies, which he co-founded, and serves as a national security analyst for NBC News and MSNBC.

In October 2020, he was among 51 former intelligence officials who signed a letter stating that reporting on Hunter Biden's laptop had "all the classic earmarks of a Russian information operation." From 2022 to 2025, he was a member of the President's Intelligence Advisory Board. In January 2025, President Donald Trump revoked his security clearance.

== Early life and education ==
Jeremy Bash was born and raised in Arlington, Virginia to a Conservative Jewish family. Bash graduated in 1989 from the Charles E. Smith Jewish Day School. Bash graduated magna cum laude and Phi Beta Kappa from Georgetown University, where he was editor-in-chief of The Hoya, the school's student newspaper, in 1989, he was an intern for Senator Chuck Robb. In 1998, Bash received his J.D. degree with honors from Harvard Law School, where he served as an editor of the Harvard Law Review.

== Career ==
Following his graduation, Bash clerked for Leonie Brinkema, U.S. District Judge in the Eastern District of Virginia.

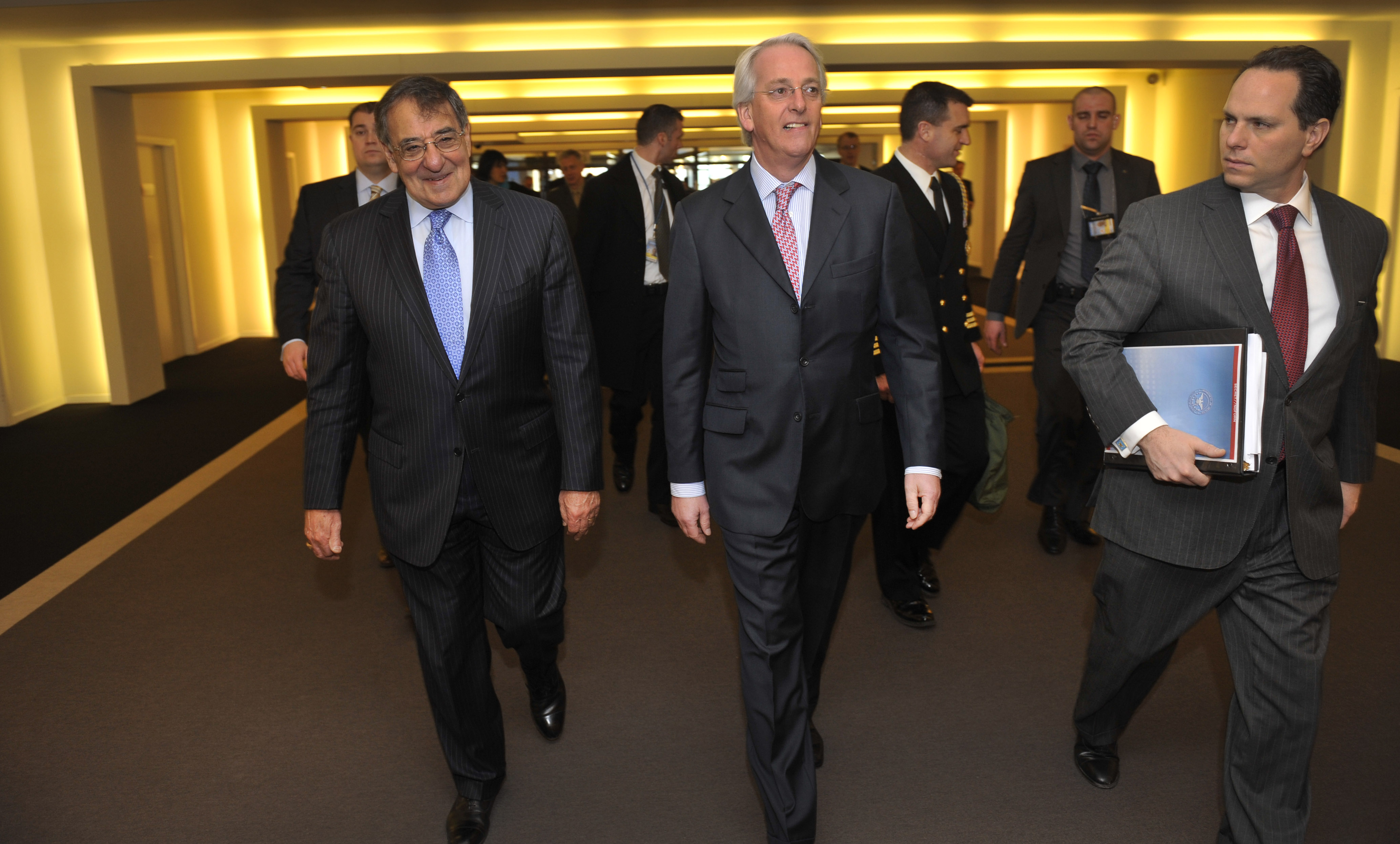
Defense Secretary Leon Panetta, NATO Ambassador Ivo Daalder, and Panetta's chief of staff Jeremy Bash at NATO headquarters in Brussels (2013)

In 2000, Bash served as the defense and foreign policy director for the presidential campaign of Al Gore and Joe Lieberman. He was a member of Gore's legal team during the 36-day recount in Florida.

From 2001 to 2004, Bash practiced law at O'Melveny & Myers in Washington, D.C., focusing on litigation and investigations. He then served as chief counsel on the Permanent Select Committee on Intelligence of the U.S. House of Representatives and as a senior national security advisor to California Representative Jane Harman, the committee's top Democrat.

In April 2022, Bash was appointed by the Senate Armed Services Committee to serve as a member of the Afghanistan War Commission, a bipartisan commission established to study U.S. military operations in Afghanistan from 2001 to 2021.

In August 2022, President Biden appointed Bash to the President's Intelligence Advisory Board.

=== Hunter Biden laptop letter ===
On October 19, 2020, Bash was among 51 former intelligence officials who signed a letter stating that the New York Post reporting on Hunter Biden's laptop had "all the classic earmarks of a Russian information operation." The letter stated the signatories did not know whether the emails were genuine and did not have evidence of Russian involvement.

On January 20, 2025, President Donald Trump signed an executive order revoking the security clearances of all 51 signatories.

== In other media ==
In 2008, a minor character based on Bash appeared in the HBO original movie Recount about the 2000 United States presidential election recount in Florida. Bash was portrayed by Derek Cecil. Bash is portrayed in the 2012 movie Zero Dark Thirty, although the character is mentioned by first name only (both within the film and in the cast credits).

In 2010, Bash was named as one of TIME Magazine's 40 Under 40, a list of 40 significant persons under age 40.

== Personal life ==
Bash was married to CNN journalist Dana Bash from 1998 to 2007.

Bash married Robyn Cooke in 2009, the vice president of government relations and public policy operations for the American Hospital Association. They have three daughters.
