= Bureau of Political-Military Affairs =

Bureau of the US Department of State

- Seal of the United States Department of State

Bureau overview
- Jurisdiction: Executive branch of the United States
- Employees: 436 (as of 2015)
- Annual budget: $161 million (FY 2015)
- Bureau executive: Fleet White, Assistant Secretary
- Parent department: U.S. Department of State
- Website: state.gov/pm

The Bureau of Political-Military Affairs (PM) is an agency within the United States Department of State that coordinates with the Department of Defense. It helps set policy in the areas of international security, security assistance, military operations, defense strategy, and defense trade. It is headed by the assistant secretary of state for political-military affairs.

== Function ==
According to the Department of State website, the bureau secures military base access and overflight permission to support the deployment of U.S. military forces. It negotiates the status of U.S. military forces and International Criminal Court non-surrender agreements. It is also responsible for coordinating the participation of coalition combat and stabilization forces, and assisting other countries in reducing the availability of man-portable air defense systems (MANPADS), which are shoulder-launched surface-to-air missiles.

The bureau seeks to create and manage defense relationships with allies of the United States, regulate arms transfers, control access to military technology, and combat the illegal trafficking of small arms or light weapons. It also is responsible for training and equipping international peacekeepers and other military personnel.

The Office of Weapons Removal and Abatement within the Bureau of Political Affairs manages the Humanitarian Mine Action Program and publishes SAFE PASSAGE: A Newsletter for the Humanitarian Mine Action and Small Arms/Light Weapons Communities.The office also publishes "To Walk the Earth in Safety," which summarizes the current U.S. effort to rid the world of the most pressing land mine and ordnance problems in a country-by-country format. Finally they have published a number of press releases that describe ongoing efforts within those communities and the Office's efforts in support of these aims. The United Nations Mine Action Centre defines "mine action" as removing land mines from the ground, assisting victims, and also teaching people how to protect themselves from danger in environments affected by land mines. In addition to promoting public and private mine action partnerships, the bureau works with the Department of Defense to provide assistance in the event of natural disasters.

Josh Paul, the director of congressional and public affairs for the Bureau of Political-Military Affairs, resigned in October 2023, amid the Gaza war, citing the "intellectual bankruptcy" of providing more weaponry to Israel amid the bombing of Gaza. Paul recalled that, in his eleven years at the bureau—the entity "most responsible" for transferring arms to other countries—he had "made more moral compromises" than he could recall.

== Organization ==
The Bureau of Political-Military Affairs is divided into twelve unique offices:

- Office of Congressional and Public Affairs
- Office of Regional Security and Arms Transfers
- Office of Defense Trade Controls Licensing
- Office of Defense Trade Controls Compliance
- Office of Defense Trade Controls Management
- Office of Defense Trade Controls Policy
- Office of Security Negotiations and Agreements
- Office of State-Defense Integration
- Office of Global Programs and Initiatives
- Office of Security Assistance
- Office of Weapons Removal and Abatement

The bureau also includes the principal deputy assistant secretary of state for political-military affairs, the deputy assistant secretary of state for Peacekeeping, Programs, and Operations; the deputy assistant secretary of state for defense trade controls; the deputy assistant secretary of state for regional security and security assistance; and the deputy assistant secretary of state and senior advisor for security negotiations and agreements, as well as the senior military advisor to the assistant secretary of state for political-military affairs, in the bureau's front office.

== Budget ==
In fiscal year 2015, the bureau's operating budget, including salaries, was approximately $161 million. Its total FY 2015 foreign assistance budget was approximately $7 billion.
