= Richard Newton Holwill =

American diplomat

Richard Newton Holwill (born October 9, 1945 Shreveport, Louisiana) served as the American Ambassador Extraordinary and Plenipotentiary to Ecuador for 16 months from July 1988 until November 1989, replacing Fernando Enrique Rondon. He had been Deputy Assistant Secretary for Inter-American Affairs at the Department of State since 1983.

Holwill graduated from Louisiana State University (B.A., 1968) and served in the United States Marine Corps from 1969 until 1971.

== Career ==
Holwill has held several positions outside of the federal government including being a member of the Board of Directors of the Panama Canal Commission, vice president of government information for The Heritage Foundation, vice president of Energy Decisions, Inc. as well as consultant and managing editor of Energy Decisions and a White House correspondent for National Public Radio.

While at The Heritage Foundation, Holwill edited "The First Year: A Mandate For Leadership Report," a 1982 review of the various implementations of the Heritage Foundation's first edition of "Mandate For Leadership," published in 1981, at the beginning of the Reagan Administration. He also edited the next edition in the series, "Agenda '83." The most recent edition of this continuing "Mandate For Leadership" series from The Heritage Foundation is also subtitled "Project 2025," and many of the authors of this latest edition hold positions in the second Trump Administration.
