= Organization of American States Secretariat for Multidimensional Security =

Secretariat for Multidimensional Security
- Abbreviation: SMS
- Formation: 2005; 21 years ago
- Headquarters: Washington, D.C., United States of America
- Region served: North America, Central America, Caribbean, South America
- Official language: English, Spanish, Portuguese, French
- Director of the Department of Public Security: Paulina Duarte
- Executive Secretary of the Inter-American Drug Abuse Control Commission: Adam Namm
- Executive Secretary of the Inter-American Committee against Terrorism: Alison Treppel
- Parent organization: Organization of American States
- Website: Official Homepage

The secretariat for multidimensional security of the Organization of American States is a part of the General Secretariat, which is headquartered in Washington, D.C., United States. The Secretariat for Multidimensional Security has a mandate to promote cooperation between Organization's member states, Inter-American and international organizations, as well as with entities such as the United Nations and its subsidiaries, in order to analyze, prevent, confront and respond to security threats.

The secretariat is composed of the Executive Office of the Secretary for Multidimensional Security and the following main directorates:

- the Department of Public Security (DPS)
- the Executive Secretariat of the Inter-American Drug Abuse Control Commission (CICAD) at the departmental level
- the Secretariat of the Inter-American Committee against Terrorism at the departmental level
- the Department against Transnational Organized Crime (DTOC)

== History ==
Secretary General José Miguel Insulza of the Organization of American States created the Secretariat for Multidimensional Security in 2005, as a direct response to the 2003 Declaration on Security in the Americas, adopted in Mexico City. This measure institutionalized the concept of multidimensional security, ensuring that the public and citizens were at the center of the secretariat's policy discussion.

The SMS works in close coordination with the Meeting of Ministers Responsible for Public Security in the Americas (MISPA) and the Meeting of Justice Ministers and Attorneys General in the Americas (REMJA).

The scope of activity of the SMS is defined by the Declaration on Security in the Americas and its conceptualization of hemispheric security as being multidimensional and comprising traditional threats and new threats, concerns, and challenges to the security of the states of the Hemisphere.

The secretariat's mandates stem from the following documents and political bodies:

- Declaration on Security in the Americas
- General Assembly Summit
- 17 Political and Technical Subsidiary Bodies

== Mission statement ==
The mission of the Secretariat for Multidimensional Security (SMS) is to promote and coordinate cooperation among the OAS Member States and between them and the Inter-American system and other bodies in the international system, in order to assess, prevent, confront, and respond effectively to threats to security, with a view to being the leading point of reference in the Hemisphere for developing cooperation and capacity-building in the OAS Member States.

— Secretariat for Multidimensional Security, 2005

== Responsibilities ==
The secretariat is mandated, as from the 2003 Declaration on Security in the Americas, to coordinate technical assistance and cooperation in the following six areas:

1. Laws;
2. Compliance with laws;
3. The prevention of delinquent activities and drug consumption;
4. Victims assistance;
5. Rehabilitation of criminal offenders;
6. The promotion of peace and security in the Hemisphere.

The Secretariat of Multidimensional Security offers solutions founded upon the model of Smart Security. This model requires objective, evidence- based and systemic approaches to the development of proposals and solutions, which respond to national or regional necessities and capacities; from a multidimensional perspective.

== Organizational structure ==
=== Secretariat for Multidimensional Security ===
==== Secretary for Multidimensional Security ====
The current Secretary for Multidimensional Security at the Organization of American States is Luis Fernando Lima Oliveira. Prior to Mr. Oliveria, the post was held by Nobel Peace Prize nominee and former attorney general of Guatemala Claudia Paz y Paz Bailey. She was the first woman ever to assume the position of attorney general in her country and has been invaluable in developing the rule of law and transforming the justice sector.

==== The Department of Public Security (DPS) ====
The DPS works with member states to develop mechanisms to evaluate and strengthen their institutional capacity to address threats to public security. These efforts focus on the following areas: the strengthening of security legislation, the improvement of law enforcement coordination and practices, the prevention of crime and violence, victim assistance and the social reintegration of convicted criminals.

The Department of Public Security's director is Paulina do Carmo Arruda Vieira Duarte.

==== Executive Secretariat of the Inter-American Drug Abuse Control Commission (CICAD) ====
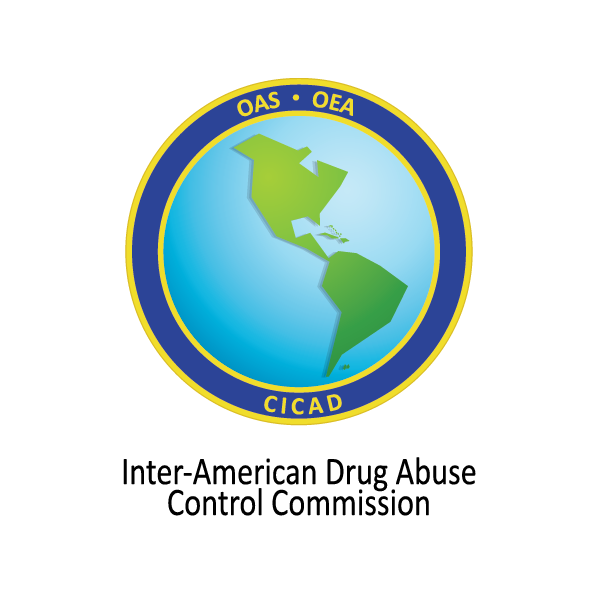
CICAD was founded by the General Assembly of the Organization of American States in 1986, in Guatemala City

The Inter-American Drug Abuse Control Commission (CICAD) is the Western Hemisphere's policy forum for dealing with the drug problem. The CICAD Executive Secretariat supports the commission by strengthening the human and institutional capabilities and channeling the collective efforts of its member states to reduce the production, trafficking and use of illegal drugs. The Hemispheric Drug Strategy, approved in May 2010, expresses the firm commitment of member states to deal with the consequences of drug trade, which poses a growing threat to health, economic development, social cohesion, and the rule of law.

CICAD was established by the General Assembly of the Organization of American States (OAS) in 1986. Each member government appoints a high-ranking representative to the commission, which meets twice a year.

CICAD's executive secretary is Adam Namm, an American diplomat and former US Ambassador to Ecuador.

==== The Secretariat of the Inter-American Committee against Terrorism (CICTE) ====
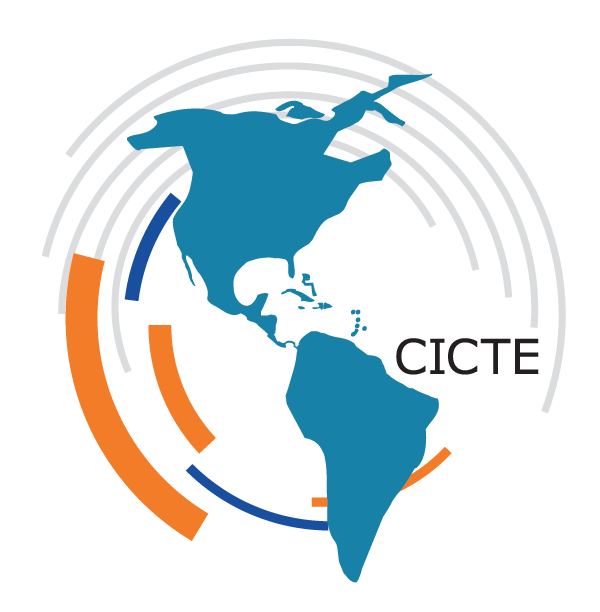
CICTE's programs include border control, cybersecurity, combating terrorism financing, immigration, customs, among others.

The main purpose of the Inter-American Committee against Terrorism (CICTE) is to promote and develop cooperation among member states to prevent, combat and eliminate terrorism, in accordance with the principles of the OAS Charter, with the Inter-American Convention Against Terrorism, and with full respect for the sovereignty of states, the rule of law, and international law, including international humanitarian law, international human rights law, and international refugee law.

CICTE is composed of all member states of the OAS and holds one regular session each year as a forum for discussion and decision-making on counter terrorism issues, measures, and cooperation. Member states designate a competent national authority, a principal representative, alternate representatives, and advisors. Member states also appoint one or more National Points of Contact with competence in the field of prevention and elimination of terrorism to serve as the principal liaison among governments of the member states and with the CICTE Secretariat for developing cooperation programs between them and the CICTE Secretariat.

CICTE's executive secretary is Alison August Treppel.

==== The Department against Transnational Organized Crime (DTOC) ====
The function of this department is to provide technical and legislative assistance to member states belonging to the OAS in the combat against transnational organized crime (TOC). DTOC, specifically, assists states in complying with the United Nations Convention against Transnational Organized Crime and the three Protocols stated therein: trafficking in persons, illicit trafficking of firearms, and illegal smuggling of migrants. The department also supports states in complying with the Hemispheric Plan of Action against TOC and the Chapultepec Consensus. Among its many functions, the combat against money laundering, is a primary task. The DTOC anti-money laundering program assists states in implementing international standards and regulations in the prevention and fight against money laundering, and its linkages with other organized crimes, such as illicit arms trafficking, illegal smuggling of migrants, and human trafficking. The GELAVEX forum is the main hemispheric entity by which DTOC helps countries in this endeavor. The forum is composed of two Sub-Working Groups: International Cooperation and Confiscation, and Coordination between Financial Intelligence Units (FIU) and Criminal Investigation Organizations (CIO). Progress from GELAVEX initiatives are several: legislative analysis among states to produce a set of guidelines with respect to money laundering, production of studies of money laundering cases linked to other transnational crimes, production of expert reports, creating a guide for spatial investigations surrounding transnational organized crime cases, and authoring studies on the confiscation of equivalent and mixed property assets. Other lines of action in the combat against transnational organized crime, include the provision of technical assistance when applying research tools and instruments when investigating criminal investigations; combating illicit mining, such as in artisanal gold; and helping implement the Inter-American Convention against the illicit Manufacturing of and trafficking in Firearms, Ammunition, explosives, and Other Related Materials (CIFTA).

==== Other political bodies with topics related to the secretariat ====
- Inter-American Defense Board
- Inter-American Convention against the Illicit Manufacturing of and Trafficking of Firearms, Ammunition, Explosives and Other Related Materials
- Hemispheric Plan Against Transnational Organized Crime
- Multilateral Evaluation Mechanism of the Inter-American Commission on Drug Abuse Control
- Working Group to Prepare a Regional Strategy to Promote Inter-American Cooperation in Dealing with Criminal Gangs
- Technical Group on Transnational Organized Crime
- Meeting of National Authorities on Trafficking of Persons
- Meeting of Officials Responsible for Penitentiary and Prison Policies
- Meeting of Forensic Specialists
- Meetings of Expert Groups in Reducing Drug Demand
- Meetings of Expert Groups on Money Laundering
- Meetings of Expert Groups on Maritime Traffic
- Meetings of Expert Groups on Precursor Chemicals
- Meetings with Attorneys General
- Meetings with Ministers of Justice
- Meetings with Ministers of Security

Finally, the secretariat maintains relationships with other agencies and international agencies such as UNODC and the Central American Integration System to carry out its mission.
