= Rowland B. Mahany =

American politician

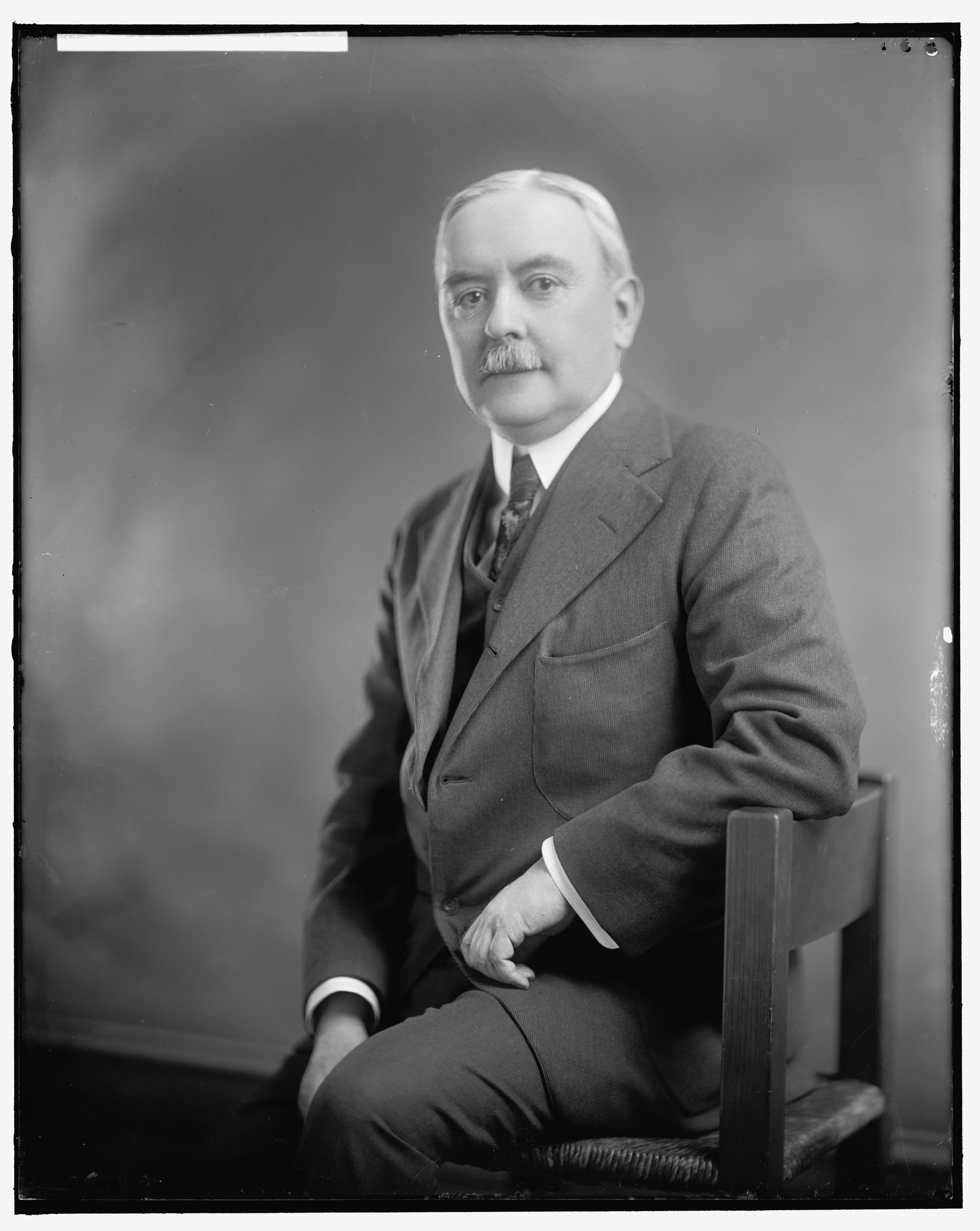

Member of the U.S. House of Representatives from New York's 32nd district
- In office March 4, 1895 – March 3, 1899
- Preceded by: Daniel N. Lockwood
- Succeeded by: William H. Ryan

Personal details
- Born: September 28, 1864 Buffalo, New York
- Died: May 2, 1937 (aged 72) Washington, D.C.
- Party: Republican

Rowland Blennerhassett Mahany (September 28, 1864 – May 2, 1937) was a U.S. Representative from New York.

Born in Buffalo, New York, Mahany attended the public schools, Hobart College, Geneva, New York, and Union College, Schenectady, New York. He graduated from Harvard University in 1888. He studied law in Buffalo, New York. He served as associate editor of the Buffalo Express in 1888. Instructor in Buffalo High School in 1889 and 1890. He declined the appointment as secretary of the legation to Chile in 1890. He was appointed Envoy Extraordinary and Minister Plenipotentiary to Ecuador on February 24, 1892, and served until his resignation on June 12, 1893. He was an unsuccessful candidate for election in 1892 to the Fifty-third Congress. He returned to Ecuador in 1893 and concluded the Santos Convention.

Mahany was elected as a Republican to the Fifty-fourth and Fifty-fifth Congresses (March 4, 1895 – March 3, 1899). He was an unsuccessful candidate for reelection in 1898. He was admitted to the bar in 1899 and engaged in the practice of law in Buffalo. He served as harbor commissioner of Buffalo 1899-1906. He was editor of the Buffalo Enquirer in 1910 and 1911. He served as commissioner of conciliation, Labor Department, in 1914 and 1915. He served as assistant to the Secretary of Labor in 1918 and 1919. He served as member of the Foreign Trades Relation Committee of the State Department in 1919. He was appointed by Woodrow Wilson as one of the ten Federal umpires for the War Labor Board in 1919. He served as a member of the United States Housing Corporation in 1919. He was appointed representative of the United States to the International Commission on Immigration and Emigration at Geneva, Switzerland, in 1920. He served as solicitor and Acting Secretary of Labor in 1920 and 1921. He resumed the practice of law in Washington, D.C., retaining his residence in Buffalo. He served as a delegate to the 1924 and 1928 Democratic National Conventions. He died in Washington, D.C., May 2, 1937, and was interred in the Congressional Cemetery.

== Sources ==
- United States Congress. "Rowland B. Mahany (id: M000062)". Biographical Directory of the United States Congress.

U.S. House of Representatives
| Preceded by Daniel N. Lockwood | Member of the U.S. House of Representatives from New York's 32nd congressional district 4 March 1895 – 3 March 1899 | Succeeded by William H. Ryan |
Diplomatic posts
| Preceded by Christian Wullweber | United States Envoy to Ecuador; 22 May 1892 – 23 June 1893 | Succeeded by Edward H. Strobel |
