= Robert Livingston Schuyler =

American historian (1883–1966)

- Born: February 26, 1883; New York City, New York, U.S.
- Died: August 15, 1966 (aged 83); Rochester, New York, U.S.
- Education: Columbia University (B.A., M.A., Ph.D.)
- Occupations: Author, academic
- Employers: Columbia University; Yale University
- Spouse: Sara Keller Brooks (after 1907)
- Parents: Montgomery Schuyler; Katherine Beekman Livingston
- Relatives: Montgomery Schuyler Jr. (brother)

Dr. Robert Livingston Schuyler (February 26, 1883 – August 15, 1966) was a prominent scholar of early American history and British history of the same time period. He was an educator and an editor. He spent most of his academic career at Columbia University.

== Early life ==
He was born in New York City. His father Montgomery Schuyler (1842–1914) was a journalist and architectural writer, and mother Katherine Beeckman Livingston (1842–1914), a direct descendant of Robert Livingston the Elder, the first Lord of Livingston Manor, was a gifted amateur artist and singer. His elder brother was Montgomery Schuyler, Jr. (1877–1955), who served as United States Minister to Ecuador and El Salvador

He began his undergraduate studies in 1899 at Columbia University where he studied under some of the principle founders and shapers of the historical profession in the United States – John W. Burgess, William Archibald Dunning, Herbert L. Osgood, and James Harvey Robinson. From them he derived a lifelong interest in constitutional history and an impressive capacity for exploiting documentary materials.

== Career ==
He worked as a reporter for The New York Times as he worked on his M.A. from Columbia. He later contributed many book reviews for the newspaper. Upon obtaining his master's degree, he became an instructor in history at Yale University. There he worked with George Burton Adams, whose celebrated textbook on English constitutional history Schuyler revised in 1934. He married Sara Keller Brooks on Oct. 19, 1907. He received his Ph.D. from Columbia in 1909 and became a lecturer there the next year. He was promoted to assistant professor in 1911, to associate professor in 1919, and to full professor in 1924. He was given the title of Gouverneur Morris Professor in 1942.

In his book, Parliament and the British Empire (1929), Schuyler discredited the old contention – which had been recently revived by C.H. McIlwain of Harvard University – that the acts against which American colonists had protested in the middle of the eighteenth century were without legal authority. Schuyler was one of a group of American historians who rejected the nationalistic bias endemic to much American-history writing. He attempted to explain how the old British Empire had really worked.

Schuyler had a continuing interest in his great English predecessors Thomas Babington Macaulay, J.R. Green, and above all, Frederic William Maitland, to whom he devoted his presidential address to the American Historical Association in 1951 entitled, [The Historical Spirit Incarnate: Frederic William Maitland]. Between 1936 and 1941, he was the managing editor of the American Historical Review. He was also a fellow of the Royal Historical Society and a member of the American Philosophical Society.

To say that he inspired the historical profession would be an understatement. Most of his colleagues in the history department were among his students. He drew up the syllabus for the Columbia College course in American history (1913) and, with Carlton J. H. Hayes, the syllabus in modern European history (1912). The latter is notable for its attention to economic and cultural history. In his later years at Columbia, he was in charge of the historiography course required of graduate students, and anyone who heard his opening lectures was permanently inoculated against the dangers of present-mindedness.

Schuyler retired from teaching in 1951 after 45 years.

== Personal life ==
In 1907, he married Sara Van Dyke (née Keller) Brooks, the sister-in-law of Luther Douglas Garrett, and the daughter of Mr. and Mrs. A. B. Keller of Kansas City. The wedding reception was held at the Hotel Gramatan in Bronxville, New York, and invitations were sent to President Theodore Roosevelt and Mrs. Edith Roosevelt, former president Grover Cleveland and his wife, Frances Folsom Cleveland, Secretary and Mrs. Elihu Root, Senator and Mrs. Chauncey Depew, and many others.

Schuyler died in Rochester, New York, on August 15, 1966.

== Books by Schuyler ==
- 1909: The Transition in Illinois from British to American government
- 1923: The Constitution of the United States
- 1931: Josiah Tucker: A Selection from his Economic and Political Writings
- 1934: Constitutional History of England
- 1945: The Fall of the Old Colonial System: A Study in British Free Trade, 1770–1870
- 1952: The Making of English History
- 1957: British Constitutional History since 1832
