= Van Brugh Livingston =

American diplomat

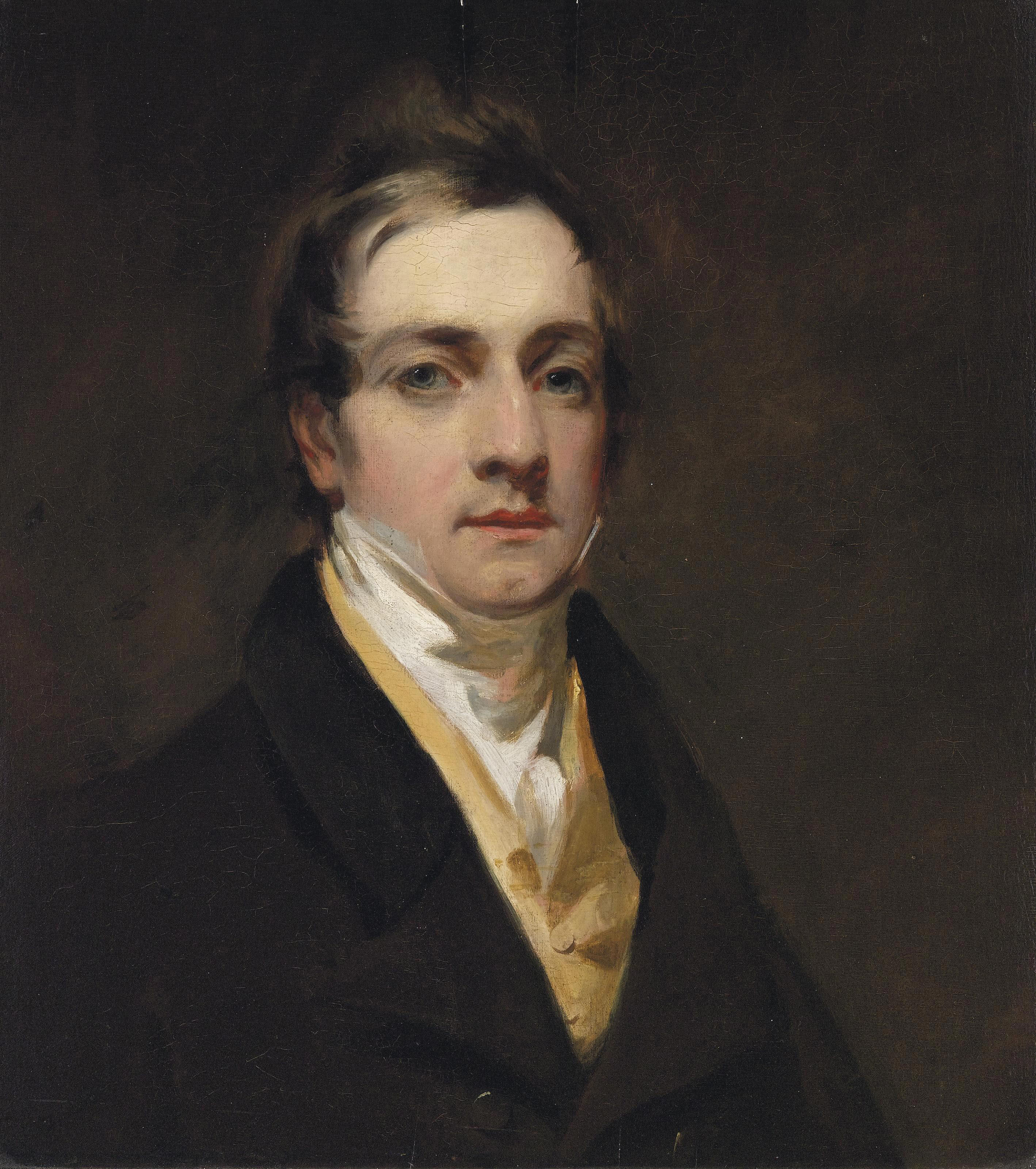
- Portrait of Livingston by Sir Henry Raeburn, c. 1819

Chargé d'Affaires to Ecuador
- In office August 12, 1848 – November 12, 1849
- Preceded by: James Chamberlayne Pickett
- Succeeded by: John Trumbull Van Alen

Personal details
- Born: Peter Van Brugh Livingston; 1792 New York City, New York, U.S.
- Died: July 16, 1868 (aged 76) New York City, New York, U.S.
- Spouse: Harriet Elizabeth Houstoun
- Children: 10
- Parent(s): Philip Peter Livingston; Cornelia Van Horne
- Relatives: See Livingston family
- Education: Columbia College

Peter Van Brugh Livingston or Van Brugh Livingston (1792 – July 16, 1868) was an American diplomat who served as the American chargé d'affaires to Ecuador from August 12, 1848 until November 12, 1849.

== Early life ==
Livingston was born in New York City in 1792 and was named after his paternal grandfather, Peter Van Brugh Livingston, who died in the year he was born. He was the son of Loyalist Philip Peter Livingston (1740–1810), who was known as "Gentleman Phil," and Cornelia (née Van Horne) Livingston (b. 1759). His siblings included Charles Ludlow Livingston (1800–1873), Philip Livingston and Richard Livingston.

His paternal grandmother was Mary Alexander (1721–1767), the daughter of James Alexander and Mary Spratt Provoost. His grandfather was a business associate of Lord Stirling, who was his grandmother's brother. His paternal grandfather, Peter Van Brugh Livingston (1710–1792), was a delegate to the New York Provincial Congresses and served as New York State Treasurer. He was the son of Philip Livingston (1686–1749), the 2nd Lord of Livingston Manor. His grandfather's older brother was Robert Livingston and his younger brothers included Philip Livingston, a signer of the United States Declaration of Independence, and William Livingston, a signer of the United States Constitution and the 1st Governor of New Jersey. His maternal grandparents were David Van Horne and Anne (née French) Van Horne, herself the daughter of Philip French III and Susanna Brockholst.

Livingston graduated from Columbia College in 1811.

== Career ==
From 1816 to 1819, Livingston, along with Albert Rolaz Gallatin (1800-1890), the second son of Albert Gallatin who was then Minister to France, made a tour of Europe from 1816 to 1819. While in Scotland, he was the guest of his kinsman, Sir Thomas Livingston, where he met and had his portrait painted in Edinburgh by Sir Henry Raeburn in 1819. The painting, or a replica, is now in the collection of the New-York Historical Society.

On April 10, 1848, Livingston was appointed the inaugural Chargé d'affaires to Ecuador at Quito, the Chief of Mission or modern equivalent of the U.S. Ambassador to Ecuador by the 11th President James K. Polk, a Democrat. The Secretary of State during his service was James Buchanan, who later became the 15th President. Originally, Daniel S. Dickinson and John Adams Dix, the U.S. Senators from New York wanted Polk to appoint Livingston as Head of the U.S. Legation to the Papal States, but after much discussion, Dix and Dickinson agreed to suggest a South American post to Livingston and Polk immediately sent the appointments of Jacob Martin (to the Papal States), Elijah Hise (to Guatemala) and John Appleton (to Bolivia) to the Senate and, two weeks later, sent an appointment for Livingston as charge to Ecuador.

He succeeded James Chamberlayne Pickett who had served as Plenipotentiary for signing a Treaty of Peace and Commerce with Ecuador. He presented his credentials on August 12, 1848 and served, during the presidency of Vicente Ramón Roca, until his mission was terminated on November 12, 1849 by a transmitted recall note.

While in office, Polk reasserted the Monroe Doctrine which opposed European colonialism in the Americas. In his role, and due to England's ostensible propping up of former Ecuadorian president Juan José Flores as a monarch, Livingston was instructed to say that "the intervention or dictation, direct or indirect, of European Governments in the affairs of the Independent States of the American Hemisphere will never be viewed with indifference by the government of the United States. On the contrary, all the moral means, at least, within their power, shall upon every occasion be employed to discourage and arrest such interference."

Livingston was succeeded by John Trumbull Van Alen under the Whig administration of President Zachary Taylor following his election in 1848.

=== Later career ===
Following his diplomatic career, Livingston worked as a principal officer appraiser in the United States Custom House on Wall Street, under Collector Cornelius Van Wyck Lawrence. In 1849, he earned $2,000 a year in this position. Livingston was among "numerous southern New York bankrupts who retained public offices for years after their failures.".

In August 1850, the Archbishop of New York John Hughes wrote to Daniel Webster, then Secretary of State under Whig president Millard Fillmore, on behalf of Livingston, stating:

He was some years ago a man of large fortune here. He lost all. But his family still depending on him, would have suffered from want of bread, if he had not, obtained a situation in the Custom House, under Mr. Curtis. It is said here that his appointment on that occasion was in great measure due to the charitable interest which Mrs. Webster took in his peculiar, and, truly touching reverse of fortune, and in the condition of his family. I have so high a respect for his integrity and feel so much for his situation, and that of his family, that I should be willing to divide with him the contents of my light purse. But this would not suffice, -and he has taken into his mind that if I interceded with the government, at Washington, on his behalf, the application would not be fruitless. I do not feel confidence enough to make any such application, unless with permission previously solicited, to do so, from some member of the Cabinet. I think that a situation which should yield a salary of from 1,500 to 2,000 per annum would be, as much, as he should expect. If sufficient talents and incorruptible integrity be qualifications I can recommend him. But, goodman, he has been heretofore, more or less Loco-focoish, -what he has since became I am not able to say. In conclusion, would it be worth my while, with an prospect of success to intercede for him at Washington? If so I should either go on or write willingly.

Hughes had previously written an introduction for Livingston's 1843 novel, An Inquiry Into the Merits of the Reformed Doctrine of "Imputation" after Livingston had converted to Catholicism after having been an Episcopalian. Webster forwarded the letter to President Fillmore, who wrote: "I do not see how we can appoint a loco-foco, M.F." The Loco-focos were a faction of the Democratic Party that existed from 1835 until the mid-1840s and was created in New York City as a protest against Tammany Hall. The party were vigorous advocates of laissez-faire and opponents of monopoly.

== Personal life ==
Shortly after returning to the United States from his European travels, Livingston was married to Mrs. Maria "Harriet" Elizabeth Houston. She was the widow of Sir Patrick Houston of Georgia. Together, they lived in Bleecker Street, in Manhattan, and were the parents of ten children, including:

- Elizabeth Ludlow Livingston (1836–1895), who was born in Dobbs Ferry, New York and who married real estate developer Joseph Montgomery Strong (1822–1894), the youngest son of Rev. Paschal Neilson Strong and Cornelia Adelaide Kane Strong, in 1856 Strong was associated with the firm of Strong & Ireland.
- Van Brugh Livingston (1840–1904), who married Ada Mary Jaudon, a daughter of banker Samuel Jaudon, in 1874.

He was an avid family historian and, like his father, shared an appreciation of the fine arts. In his an appendage to his will in 1856, he recorded the transfer of several Livingston family paintings to his son, Van Brugh Livingston.

Livingston died in New York City on July 16, 1868.

=== Descendants ===
Through his daughter Elizabeth, he was the grandfather of Joseph Montgomery Strong, Jr. (1857–1938), Peter Van Brugh Livingston Strong (b. 1858), Mary Livingston (née Strong) Spencer (b. 1860), Charles Livingston Strong (b. 1862), Philip Alexander Livingston Strong (b. 1864), and Joseph Gebhard Strong.

== Published works ==
- Livingston, Van Brugh: An Inquiry Into the Merits of the Reformed Doctrine of "Imputation," as Contrasted With Those of "Catholic Imputation;" or, The Cardinal Point of Controversy between The Church of Rome and the Protestant High Church: Together with Miscellaneous Essays on the Catholic Faith New York: Casserly & Sons (1843)

Political offices
Preceded by James C. Pickett	U.S. Chargé d'Affaires, Ecuador; 1848–1849	Succeeded by John Van Alen
