= Montgomery Schuyler =

American architect (1843–1914)

- Born: August 19, 1843; Ithaca, New York, U.S.
- Died: July 16, 1914 (aged 70); New Rochelle, New York, U.S.
- Education: Hobart College
- Occupations: Writer, critic
- Employer(s): The New York Times, Harper's Weekly, The Sun
- Spouse: Katherine Beeckman Livingston (m. 1876; died 1914)
- Children: Montgomery Schuyler Jr. Robert Livingston Schuyler
- Parent(s): Rev. Anthony Schuyler; Eleanor Johnson

Montgomery Schuyler AIA, (August 19, 1843, Ithaca, New York – July 16, 1914, New Rochelle, New York) was a highly influential critic, journalist and editorial writer in New York City who wrote about and influenced art, literature, music and architecture during the city's "Gilded Age." He was active as a journalist for over forty years but is principally noted as a highly influential architecture critic, and advocate of modern designs and defender of the skyscraper.

== Early life ==
Schuyler was born in Ithaca, New York, on August 19, 1843. He was the son of Eleanor (née Johnson) Schuyler (1818–1849) and the Rev. Dr. Anthony Schuyler (1816–1900), one time rector of the Protestant Episcopal Church Grace Church in Orange, New Jersey, which is now known as the Church of the Epiphany. His siblings included Eleanor Schuyler (d. 1850), Ben Johnson Schuyler (d. 1854), Charles Brother Schuyler (1841–1929). After his mother's death, his father remarried to Mary Hall Allen in 1860, with whom his father had another daughter and two sons, Montgomery's half-siblings, Rev. Hamilton Schuyler and Anthony Schuyler Jr.

His paternal grandparents were Alborn Schuyler (b. 1788) and Caroline (née Butler) Schuyler. The Schuylers were one of the oldest families in New York, descendants of Philip Pieterse Schuyler, who settled in Beverwyck (now Albany, New York) in 1650, through his son Arent Schuyler (1662–1730) and his son Casparus Schuyler (1695–1754). His maternal grandparents were Ben Johnson (1783–1848) and Jane (née Dey) Johnson (1798–1881).

Schuyler entered Hobart College in 1858 but failed to graduate. He became a member of the Sigma Phi Society.

== Professional career ==
In 1865, at the end of the American Civil War, Schuyler came to New York and worked as an editorial writer on The World before leaving to join the editorial staff of The New York Times in 1883. He worked as an editorial writer for The New York Times for twenty-four years. During his time at The Times, he wrote many articles, including articles about the architecture of Washington, D.C., about the 3,000 miles between New York and California, about the work of William Wordsworth, the work of Russell Sturgis, and the work of Henry James.

In the 1870s, Schuyler supported Frederick Law Olmsted, a friend, H. H. Richardson, whom he admired, and Leopold Eidlitz in the controversy surrounding the completion of the New York State Capitol buildings. In 1882, Schuyler, who lived at the end of East 84th Street in Manhattan, proposed building a residential development project between East 81st Street and East 84th Street, along the East River just south of the East River Park (now known as the Carl Schurz Park). In 1883, Schuyler wrote upon the opening of the Brooklyn Bridge in New York:

"It so happens that the work which is likely to be our most durable monument, and to convey some knowledge of us to the most remote posterity, is a work of bare utility; not a shrine, not a fortress, not a palace, but a bridge."

From 1885 to 1887, he was managing editor of Harper's Weekly, and from 1887 to 1894, was connected with the publishing department of Harper & Bros., serving both in an editorial capacity and as a writer. In the last few years of his career, Schuyler was a contributor to The Sun, and also wrote for many magazines and periodicals, particularly on the subject of architecture, in which he specialized. He was a staunch advocate of the modern skyscraper, who believed that it was "a legitimate architectural expression of our times."

In 1892, he published his seminal work, American Architecture Studies published by Harper & Brothers Publishers. In the book, similarly to Louis Sullivan's feelings in his 1892 book, Ornament in Architecture, he stated: "If you were to scrape down to the face of the main wall of the buildings of these streets, you would find that you had simply removed all the architecture, and that you had left the buildings as good as ever."

=== Later life ===
He retired from the New York Times in 1907 and moved to New Rochelle, New York, "taking an active interest in local affairs, acting in an advisory capacity on questions of beautifying the city and the artistic and harmonious architectural development of the town."

Schuyler was a member of the American Institute of Architects, the National Institute of Arts and Letters, and the Century Club.

== Personal life ==
In 1876, he married Katherine Beeckman Livingston (1842–1914). Their families were previously connected as Schuyler's seven times great-aunt had married Katherine's ancestor, Robert Livingston, first Lord of the manor of Livingston (also ancestor of both Presidents Bush and Eleanor Roosevelt) in Albany in 1679. Together, Montgomery and Katherine were the parents of:

- Montgomery Schuyler Jr. (1877–1955), who was secretary to the U.S. legation in St. Petersburg, Russia in 1902, U.S. Consul General in Bangkok, U.S. Minister to Ecuador, U.S. Minister to El Salvador.
- Robert Livingston Schuyler (1883–1966), who served as president of the American Historical Association.

Schuyler's wife died on July 7, 1914. Schuyler died of pneumonia shortly thereafter at his home at 250 Winyah Avenue, New Rochelle, New York, on July 16, 1914. He was buried alongside his wife at Green-Wood Cemetery in Brooklyn, New York.

== Published works ==
- Westward the Course of Empire
- Studies in American Architecture
- The Brooklyn Bridge (with W. C. Conant)
- Articles for Harper's Magazine
- "Recent Building in New York" (September 1883)
- "The Metropolitan Opera-house" (November 1883)
- "Glimpses of western architecture. III.—St. Paul and Minneapolis" (October 1891)
- "Glimpses of western architecture. Chicago.—II" (September 1891)
- "Glimpses of western architecture. Chicago.—I" (August 1891)
- American Architecture Studies (1892), Harper & Brothers Publishers
