= Jaudon =

Jaudon is a surname. Notable people with the surname include:

- Samuel Jaudon (1796–1874), American banker and businessman
- Valerie Jaudon (born 1945), American painter
