= Philo White =

American politician (1796–1883)

United States Minister Resident to Ecuador
- In office September 2, 1854 – September 14, 1858
- President: Franklin Pierce; James Buchanan
- Preceded by: Courtland Cushing
- Succeeded by: Charles R. Buckalew

Member of the Wisconsin Senate from the 17th district
- In office June 5, 1848 – January 1, 1849
- Preceded by: Position established
- Succeeded by: Victor Willard

Member of the Council of the Wisconsin Territory from Racine County
- In office October 18, 1847 – May 29, 1848 Serving with Frederick S. Lovell
- Preceded by: Marshall Strong
- Succeeded by: Position abolished

Personal details
- Born: June 23, 1796 Whitestown, New York, U.S.
- Died: February 15, 1883 (aged 86) Whitestown, New York, U.S.
- Party: Democratic
- Spouse: Nancy R. Hampton (m. 1822)
- Children: Mary (Ellis)^{(b. 1824; died 1844)}; Esther White^{(b. 1830; died 1832)}
- Relatives: John Willis Ellis (son-in-law); Hugh White (cousin)

Philo White, Jr., (June 23, 1796 – February 15, 1883) was an American newspaper publisher, Democratic politician, and Wisconsin pioneer. He was United States Minister (ambassador) to Ecuador during the presidency of Franklin Pierce, and was a member of the first session of the Wisconsin State Senate.

== Early life ==
White was born in Whitestown, New York, on June 23, 1796. He was one of nine children born to Philo White (1767–1849) and Esther (née Holt) White (1764–1841). His paternal grandfather was Judge Hugh White, the namesake of Whitestown, New York, and a quartermaster during the American Revolutionary War.

White obtained his early education at the Whitestown Seminary.

== Career ==
In 1820, after spending a few years in a printing office in Utica, White moved to Salisbury, North Carolina. From 1820 to 1830, White published the Western Carolinian. From 1830 to 1834, he was a purchasing agent for the United States Navy. From 1834 to 1836, he published the Raleigh Standard.

In 1836, he moved to Milwaukee, Wisconsin, and in 1844, he moved to Racine, Wisconsin, while serving as a Purser in the U.S. Navy. He later helped to establish and edited the Milwaukee Sentinel. White also owned and published the Racine Advocate for a time and was active in the founding of Racine College.

White, a Democrat, was a member of the Wisconsin Territorial Legislature from 1847 to 1848, and in 1848 became a member of the first Wisconsin State Senate from the 17th District, serving for a year; he was succeeded by Free Soiler Victor Willard.

On July 18, 1853, White was appointed U.S. Chargé d'affaires in Ecuador. He presented his credentials on December 27, 1853, and served through his appointment by President Franklin Pierce on June 29, 1854, as U.S. Minister to Ecuador, for which he presented his credentials on September 2, 1854. On February 25, 1856, he was nominated as Envoy Extraordinary and Minister Plenipotentiary to Ecuador but it was withdrawn before the Senate acted on it. White presented his recall on September 14, 1858, and was succeeded by Charles R. Buckalew who was appointed by James Buchanan.

== Personal life ==
On May 9, 1822, White was married to Nancy R. Hampton (1816–1901) in Rowan County, North Carolina, the daughter of William and Mary Hampton. Together, they were the parents of two daughters:

- Mary White (1824–1844), who married John Willis Ellis of Salisbury, North Carolina on August 25, 1844. After her death, he remarried and later became the 35th Governor of North Carolina.
- Esther White (1830–1832), who died young.

White died on February 15, 1883, in Whitestown, New York.

Wisconsin Senate
New state established	Member of the Wisconsin Senate from the 17th district June 5, 1848 – January 1, 1849	Succeeded by Victor Willard
Diplomatic posts
Preceded by Courtland Cushing	United States Minister Resident to Ecuador; September 2, 1854 – September 14, 1858	Succeeded by Charles R. Buckalew
