= Heather M. Hodges =

American diplomat

Heather Mary Hodges
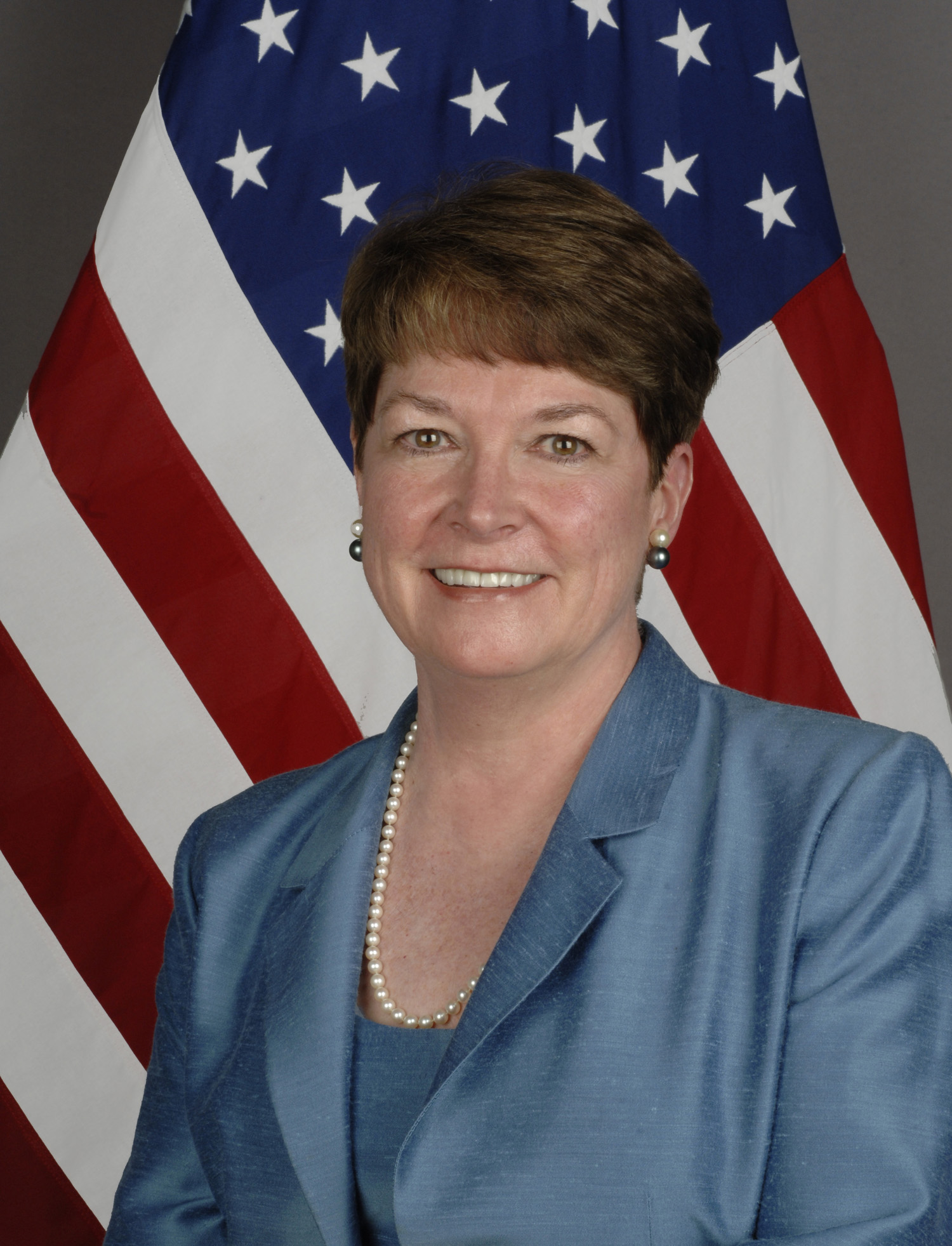
- Official portrait, 2008

United States Ambassador to Ecuador
- In office October 2, 2008 – April 5, 2011
- President: George W. Bush; Barack Obama
- Preceded by: Linda Jewell
- Succeeded by: Adam Namm

United States Ambassador to Moldova
- In office October 3, 2003 – April 9, 2006
- President: George W. Bush
- Preceded by: Pamela Hyde Smith
- Succeeded by: Michael D. Kirby

Personal details
- Born: 1946 (age 79–80) Cleveland, Ohio, U.S.
- Education: College of St. Catherine
- Profession: Diplomat

Heather Mary Hodges (born 1946) is a career United States foreign service officer. She has been the United States Ambassador to Moldova! and the United States Ambassador to Ecuador.

== Biography ==
Hodges is a native of Cleveland, Ohio, United States. She has a B.A. in Spanish from the College of St. Catherine, St. Paul, Minnesota, and an M.A. from New York University. She lived and worked in Madrid, Spain, throughout the 1970s.

Hodges joined the Foreign Service in 1980 and was assigned to Caracas, Venezuela. Following Caracas, she served in Guatemala and later in Washington as Peru Desk Officer. In 1987, Ms. Hodges received a Pearson Fellowship to work in the U.S. Congress, where she was counsel to the Senate Subcommittee on Immigration and Refugee Affairs. In January 1989, she became Consul General at the U.S. Consulate in Bilbao, Spain. In 1991, she returned to the U.S. to serve as Deputy Director of the Office of Cuban Affairs.

In 1993, Hodges was assigned to Managua, Nicaragua, as Deputy Chief of Mission. From August 1996 to June 1997, Hodges participated in the Department of State's Senior Seminar, a leadership program for select members of the Foreign Service. She served as the Deputy Chief of Mission in Lima, Peru, from July 1997 to May 2000 and was also Deputy Chief of Mission at the U.S. Embassy in Madrid, Spain, from June 2000 to July 2003.

She served as U.S. Ambassador to Moldova from September 2003 to May 2006. She was then appointed Principal Deputy Assistant Secretary in the Office of the Director General.

She was sworn in as the U.S. Ambassador to Ecuador on July 15, 2008, arrived in Ecuador in early August, and presented her credentials to President Rafael Correa on October 2, 2008.

On April 4, 2011, the Spanish newspaper El País reported that Ms. Hodges had expressed concern over Ecuador's National Police being corrupt via a cable dated July 10, 2009. She warned that their National Police Commander, Jaime Aquilino Hurtado, might be involved in illegal activity. According to The New York Times, this involved "his possible involvement in schemes to extort bribes from a taxi union, steal public funds and ease trafficking of undocumented Chinese immigrants." She also recommended the United States revoke Hurtado's visa. It was also noted that President Correa may have known about Hurtado. On April 5, 2011, Ecuador expelled Hodges from the country after she failed to give the Ecuadorian government a satisfactory explanation of accusations made public in the WikiLeaks diplomatic cables.

== Awards ==
- The Government of Spain awarded Hodges the Spanish decoration of "Isabel la Catolica – Encomienda de Numero" for her contributions to Spain – United States relations.
- The Government of Moldova presented her with the Award of Honor in 2006.
- She was awarded a Presidential Meritorious Service Award in the U.S. in 2006.

== Gallery ==
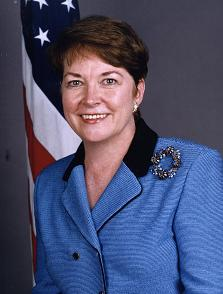

Diplomatic posts
Preceded by Pamela Hyde Smith	United States Ambassador to Moldova; 2003–2006	Succeeded by Michael D. Kirby
Preceded by Linda Jewell	United States Ambassador to Ecuador; 2008–2011	Succeeded by Adam Namm
