= Todd C. Chapman =

American diplomat (born 1962)

Todd Crawford Chapman
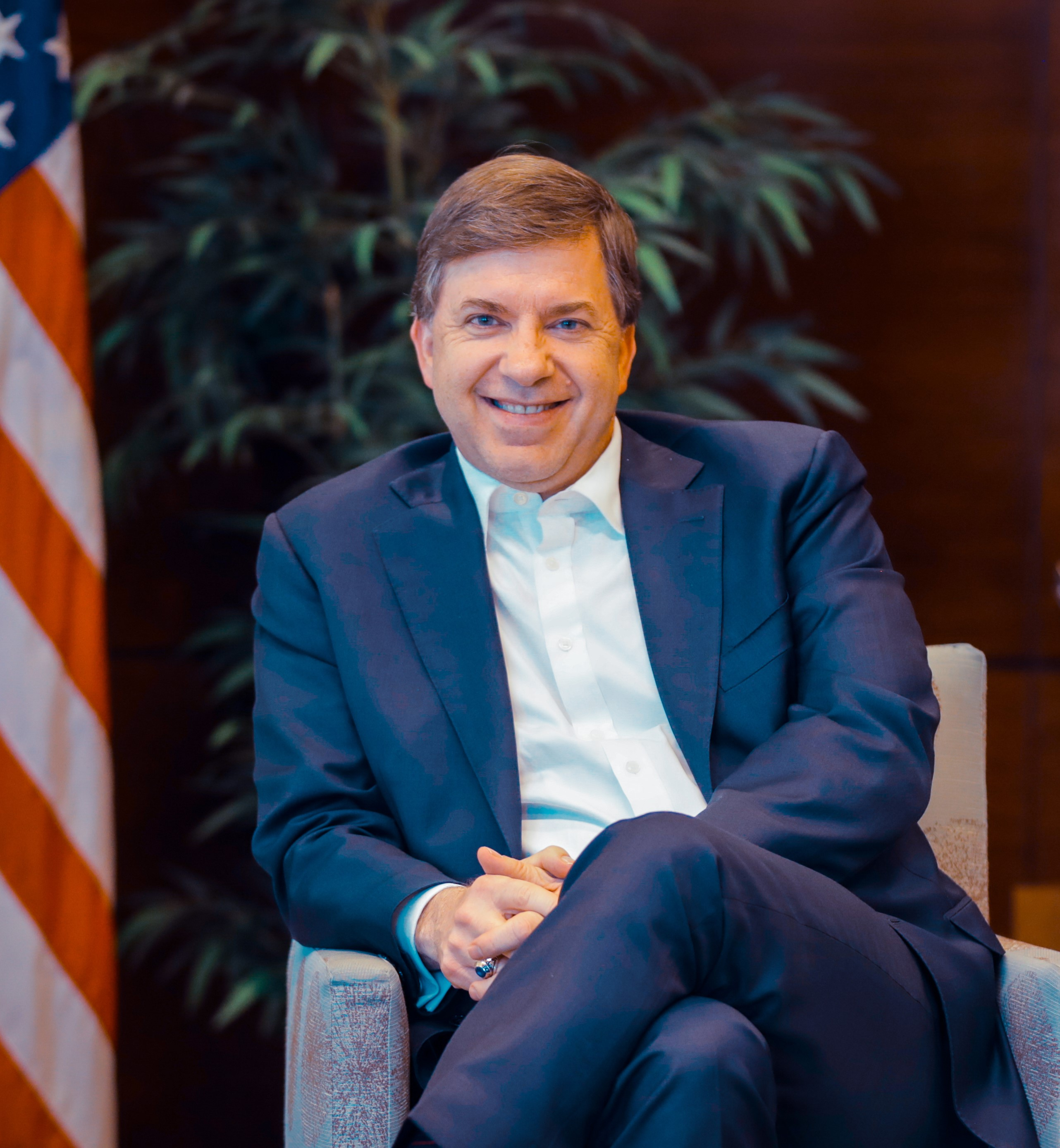

United States Ambassador to Brazil
- In office March 30, 2020 – July 23, 2021
- President: Donald Trump; Joe Biden
- Preceded by: Michael McKinley
- Succeeded by: Elizabeth Frawley Bagley

United States Ambassador to Ecuador
- In office April 14, 2016 – June 8, 2019
- President: Barack Obama; Donald Trump
- Deputy: Robin D. Meyer
- Preceded by: Adam E. Namm
- Succeeded by: Michael J. Fitzpatrick

Personal details
- Born: 1962 (age 63–64) Houston, Texas, U.S.
- Spouse: Janetta Chapman
- Children: 2
- Education: Duke University (AB); Joint Military Intelligence College (MS)
- Occupation: Diplomat

Todd Crawford Chapman (born 1962) is an American career diplomat who has served as the United States ambassador to Brazil from 2020 to 2021 and as the United States ambassador to Ecuador from 2016 to 2019.

As a career United States Foreign Service officer, Chapman joined the State Department in 1990 and became a Minister Counselor in the Senior Foreign Service. He has held many positions within the State Department, including as U.S. ambassador to Ecuador from 2016 to 2019 and U.S. ambassador to Brazil from 2020 to 2021. He arrived in Brazil on March 29, 2020, and presented his credentials to the President of Brazil the following day. He retired from the foreign service in July 2021.

== Early life and education ==
Chapman was born in Houston, Texas. When he was a child, he moved with his family to São Paulo, Brazil. Chapman lived in Brazil through secondary school, graduating from Escola Maria Imaculada.

Chapman earned an A.B. in history from Duke University and a Master of Science in Strategic Intelligence from the Joint Military Intelligence College in 2000.

== Career ==
In 2001, Chapman was assigned as an Economic Officer in San Jose, Costa Rica. In 2004, he was appointed Political/Economic/Commercial Counselor at the embassy in La Paz, Bolivia.

In 2006 he served as executive assistant in the Bureau of Western Hemisphere Affairs, and in 2007 he served as Deputy Chief of Mission in Maputo, Mozambique. He served as Senior Diplomatic Coordinator for Economic Affairs in Kabul, Afghanistan, from 2010 to 2011. In 2011, he was assigned as Deputy Chief of Mission to Brasília, Brazil.

In 2015 Chapman was appointed United States Ambassador to Ecuador by President Barack Obama and confirmed by the U.S. Senate.

Chapman presented his credentials as United States Ambassador to Ecuador on April 14, 2016, and served until June 8, 2019.

On October 30, 2019, President Donald Trump nominated Chapman to become United States Ambassador to Brazil. On February 11, 2020, the United States Senate confirmed his nomination by voice vote. Some observers criticized Chapman for appearing to take a friendly stance toward Brazilian president Jair Bolsonaro. In June 2021, citing personal reasons, Chapman announced his intention to retire and to spend the next thirty days continuing to strengthen relations between the United States and Brazil.

On June 9, 2021, Todd Chapman communicated to US President Joe Biden his request for retirement from the State Department service for personal reasons, ending a career spanning three decades. He officially left his post and retired on July 23, 2021.

=== Postings ===
- United States Ambassador to Ecuador (2016 to 2019)
- Washington D.C., Principal Deputy Assistant Secretary of State for Political Military Affairs (2014)
- Brasília, Brazil, Deputy Chief of Mission (2011)
- Kabul, Afghanistan, Senior Diplomatic Coordinator for Economic Affairs, U.S. Embassy Kabul (2010 to 2011)
- Maputo, Mozambique, Deputy Chief of Mission (2007)
- Washington D.C., Executive Assistant, Bureau of Western Hemisphere Affairs (2006)
- La Paz, Bolivia, Political/Economic/Commercial Counselor
- San Jose, Costa Rica, Economic Officer (2001)
- Abuja, Nigeria, Energy Officer (1997)
- Maputo, Mozambique, Economic/Commercial officer (1993)
- Taipei, Taiwan, Consular Officer at American Institute in Taiwan (1991)

== See also ==
- List of current ambassadors of the United States

Diplomatic posts
Preceded by Adam E. Namm	United States Ambassador to Ecuador; January 29, 2016 – June 6, 2019	Succeeded by Michael J. Fitzpatrick
Preceded by Michael McKinley	United States Ambassador to Brazil; March 30, 2020 – July 3, 2021	Succeeded by Elizabeth Frawley Bagley
