= Miller platform =

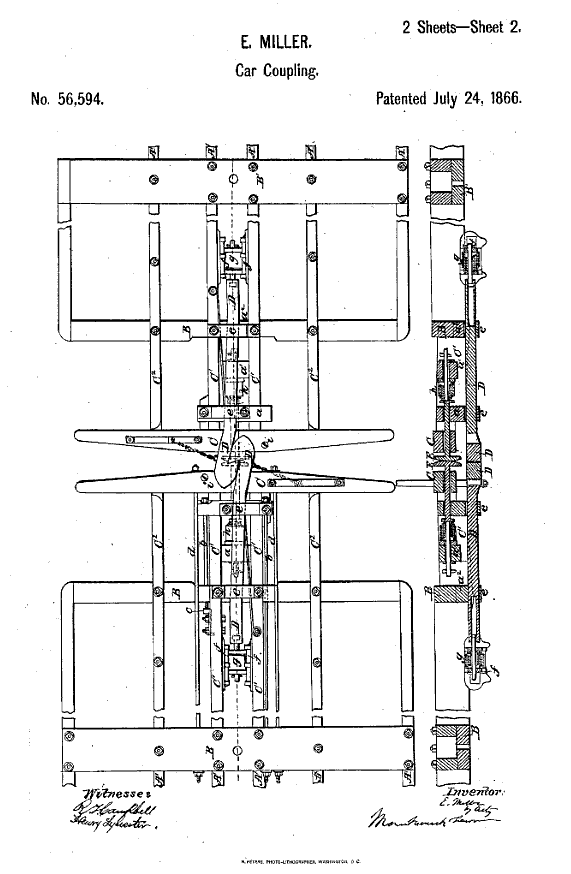
Miller's design for railroad cars and couplers

The Miller platform was an innovative railroad passenger car platform of the 19th century designed to prevent the hazard of telescoping in railroad collisions. It was named for its U.S. inventor, Ezra L. Miller, who was issued a patent for it on July 24, 1866. The platform was part of an assembly which included a new type of coupler called the Miller hook which came to replace the older link-and-pin coupler.
