= Ezra Miller (politician) =

American politician (1812–1885)

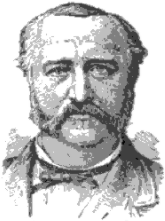

Member of the New Jersey Senate from the Bergen County district
- In office 1884 – July 9, 1885
- Preceded by: Isaac Wortendyke
- Succeeded by: John W. Bogert

Member of the Wisconsin Senate from the 17th district
- In office January 3, 1853 – January 1, 1855
- Preceded by: Stephen O. Bennett
- Succeeded by: James Sutherland

Personal details
- Born: May 12, 1812 Bergen County, New Jersey, U.S.
- Died: July 9, 1885 (aged 73) Mahwah, New Jersey, U.S.
- Resting place: Green-Wood Cemetery, Brooklyn
- Party: Democratic
- Spouse: Amanda Miller (m. 1841; died 1881)
- Children: Amanda Josephine (Hinman)^{(b. 1844; died 1908)}; Ezra Wilson Miller^{(b. 1845; died 1905)}; Harriet Martha (Van Kirk)^{(b. 1847; died 1897)}; Jordan Gray Miller^{(b. 1850; died 1924)}; Franklin Pierce Miller^{(b. 1854; died 1914)}
- Occupation: Inventor, politician

Military service
- Allegiance: United States
- Branch/service: Wisconsin militia
- Years of service: 1850s
- Rank: Colonel

Ezra Miller (May 12, 1812 – July 9, 1885) was an American inventor and politician from New Jersey. He is best known as the inventor of the Miller platform, a safety innovation designed to prevent telescoping in railroad collisions. As a Democratic politician, he also served two years in the Wisconsin Senate (1853, 1854), and later served the last two years of his life in the New Jersey Senate (1884, 1885). In historical documents, he was often referred to with the honorific "colonel", due to his service in the Wisconsin militia in the 1850s.

== Biography ==
Miller was born in Bergen County, New Jersey.

In 1833, he joined the 2nd New York Militia. Miller married his wife, Amanda, in May 1841. They had three children and moved to Magnolia, Wisconsin. In 1851, he was commissioned a colonel in the 8th Wisconsin Militia.

In 1863, he was granted the first in a series of patents for railroad couplers which came to be known as the Miller platform.

Miller died on July 9, 1885, in Mahwah, New Jersey.

== Political career ==
Miller was a member of the Wisconsin State Senate from the 17th district from 1853 to 1854. Additionally, he was a justice of the peace in Magnolia and Postmaster of Janesville, Wisconsin. Miller joined the New Jersey Senate in 1884. He was a Democrat.
