= Stephen O. Bennett =

American farmer and politician (1807–1886)

Member of the Wisconsin Senate from the 17th district
- In office January 6, 1851 – January 3, 1853
- Preceded by: Victor Willard
- Succeeded by: Ezra Miller

Member of the Wisconsin State Assembly from the Racine 2nd district
- In office January 7, 1850 – January 6, 1851
- Preceded by: James DeNoon Reymert
- Succeeded by: Peter Van Vliet

Personal details
- Born: 1807 Milton, New York, U.S.
- Died: May 24, 1886 (aged 78–79) Chicago, Illinois, U.S.
- Resting place: Mountain Home Cemetery, Kalamazoo, Michigan
- Party: Republican; Free Soil

Stephen Osander Bennett (1807 – May 24, 1886) was an American merchant, farmer, and Free Soil politician. He was an early settler at Raymond, Wisconsin, and represented Racine County in the Wisconsin State Senate (1851–1852) and Assembly (1850).

== Background ==
Bennett was born in 1807 in Milton, New York. He moved in his youth to New Haven, Connecticut, in preparation for college, but his eyesight made that impractical. Instead, he became a merchant, first in Albany, New York, and later in New York City. In 1832 he moved to Ohio, and, in 1840, settled on a farm in the Wisconsin Territory. He was one of the first settlers in Raymond, in Racine County. He declared himself bankrupt in 1843.

== Public office ==
He was elected as a Freesoiler or "Free Soil Democrat" delegate to the First (1846) Wisconsin Constitutional Convention, serving on the committee on amendments to the constitution. He was elected to the Assembly from Racine County for the 1850 session (succeeding James DeNoon Reymert, another Free Soiler), and to the Wisconsin State Senate for 1851 and 1852 sessions, succeeding fellow Free Soiler Victor Willard. He was succeeded in the Assembly by Peter Van Vliet of Caledonia.

The Senate was expanded and redistricted in 1853, and Bennett was succeeded in what was now the 7th Senate district by Democrat John W. Cary. In later years he joined the Republican Party.

== After the Assembly ==
In 1853 he was elected president of the Racine County Agricultural Society.

In 1859, he sold his farm and moved to Kalamazoo, Michigan, where he resumed his prior occupation as a merchant. He died suddenly on May 24, 1886, while on a business trip to Chicago.

Wisconsin State Assembly
Preceded by James DeNoon Reymert	Member of the Wisconsin State Assembly from the Racine 2nd district January 7, 1850 – January 6, 1851	Succeeded by Peter Van Vliet
Wisconsin Senate
Preceded by Victor Willard	Member of the Wisconsin Senate from the 17th district January 6, 1851 – January 3, 1853	Succeeded by Ezra Miller
