= Courtland Cushing =

American lawyer, judge, and diplomat

Chargé d'Affaires to Ecuador
- In office June 3, 1851 – October 12, 1853
- President: Millard Fillmore
- Preceded by: John Trumbull Van Alen
- Succeeded by: Philo White

Personal details
- Born: July 1, 1809 Warren County, Ohio, U.S.
- Died: May 24, 1856 (aged 46) Isthmus of Panama
- Spouse(s): Sarah Ross (m. 1833; died 1843) Margaret Hutton (m. 1847; died 1848)
- Children: 3
- Parent(s): Daniel Lewis Cushing; Margaret Van Horne Cushing
- Education: Miami University

Courtland Cushing (July 1, 1809 – May 24, 1856) was an American lawyer, judge, and diplomat.

== Early life ==
Cushing, who was born on July 1, 1809, in Warren County, Ohio. He was the third child of Brigadier General Daniel Lewis Cushing (1764–1815) and his second wife, Margaret (née Van Horne) Cushing (1775–1860), who married in New York City in 1801. His siblings included William Van Horne Cushing; Anna Cushing, the wife of Washington Lawrence; Hannah Lewis Cushing, the wife of John McFadden Gallagher; and Clara Corwin Cushing, the wife of John W. Taylor. His father was previously married to Zeruiah Chamberlain, daughter of Job Chamberlain, with whom he had five children. Cushing's five elder half-siblings were Ethan Allen Cushing (who died young), Theophilus Cushing, Nathan Cushing, Daniel Cushing, and Ethan Allen Cushing. His father was a New York merchant until 1806 when he moved near Sackets Harbor in Jefferson County, New York, and laid out a town, naming it Huron. In December 1807, the Cushings went to Lebanon, Ohio.

His paternal grandparents were Hannah (née Lewis) Cushing and Theophilus Cushing and his maternal grandparents were Lavinia (née Budd) Van Horne and William Van Horne, brigade chaplain in the Continental Army.

Cushing graduated from Miami University in Oxford, Ohio, in 1829.

== Career ==
Cushing was admitted to the bar in Warren County, Ohio. Shortly before his marriage in 1833, he moved to Madison, Indiana, where he practiced for several years and became a prosecuting attorney for Decatur County, between 1833 and 1837. On July 1, 1841, President John Tyler, a Whig, nominated Cushing to replace John Pettit (later a U.S. Representative and U.S. Senator from Indiana) as the United States Attorney for the District of Indiana. Cushing's friend and fellow Miami University alumni, John A. Matson (who unsuccessfully ran for Congress and for Governor of Indiana), named his son Courtland Cushing Matson, later a U.S. Representative from Indiana, after him upon his birth in 1841.

In 1844, the Indiana Senate elected Cushing to serve for a term of seven years "from and after the eighteenth day of December, A. D., 1844" as President Judge of the third Circuit Court to succeed Judge Miles C. Eggleston. Reportedly, Cushing "had respectable talents, was very dressy and quite a beau among the ladies." Cushing resigned on August 9, 1850, and was succeeded by Alexander C. Downey who served until the adoption of a new Constitution in 1852.

=== Chargé d'Affaires to Ecuador ===
On September 28, 1850, he was appointed Chargé d'Affaires to Ecuador at Quito by President Millard Fillmore, a fellow Whig. He presented his credentials on June 3, 1851. In Ecuador, Cushing's view of the country substantially differed from his predecessor, John Trumbull Van Alen, who was known as "callow and impulsive" and reportedly "lacked experience in diplomacy and knowledge of Ecuadorian politics." Van Alen had "decided that Ecuador could be rescued from ruin only by General Flores," the former president of Ecuador, and wrote to Washington that Flores was popular and had been "unjustly ousted by a small clique of opportunists." Cushing, however, wrote two years later that "Flores was, as a matter of fact, enormously unpopular in Ecuador and that his return would be a disaster." He further wrote that "The United States cannot view with indifference such an attempt to interfere with the independence and sovereignty of the Republic."

In 1852, Cushing wrote to then U.S. Secretary of State Daniel Webster in Washington, including to write that "two 18 pound balls passed through several rooms of my house" in Guayaquil while Flores attacked the city. Also while in office, Cushing "slapped in a claim for $40,000 US dollars against the Republic of Ecuador as compensation to the owners and crew of the ship" that was pirated on its way to the Galapagos Islands. Cushing's mission was terminated by note on October 12, 1853. He was succeeded by former Wisconsin State Senator Philo White, who was appointed by Democratic President Franklin Pierce.

=== Later career ===
After serving his term, he began working as an agent for Cornelius Vanderbilt's Accessory Transit Company until his death in 1856 on the Isthmus of Panama, the narrow strip of land that lies between the Caribbean Sea and the Pacific Ocean, linking North and South America that contains the country of Panama.

== Personal life ==
On October 16, 1833, Cushing was married to Sarah Ross (d. 1843), daughter of Phineas Ross of Warren County. Together, they were the parents of:

- Mary Cushing (1834–1867), who married Eben Hall (1818–1871).
- Sarah Corwin Cushing (b. 1837), who worked as a private secretary to Cushing's friend, William McKee Dunn, a former U.S. Representative from Indiana and the Judge Advocate General of the United States Army.
- Daniel H. Cushing (b. 1841), who became Clerk of the Court of Common Pleas of Clark County, Ohio.

After the death of his first wife, he remarried in 1847 to Margaret Hutton of Baltimore, Maryland. She died the following year.

Cushing died on May 24, 1856, on the Isthmus of Panama and was buried at Puntas Arenas in Nicaragua.

=== Descendants ===
Through his daughter Mary, he was the grandfather of four granddaughters, including Norah Hall, Mary Hall (who died in infancy), Sallie Hall (wife of John D. Ryan of Louisville, Kentucky) and Anna Hall (wife of Dr. John Wilber Hulick of Springfield, Ohio).

== See also ==
- List of ambassadors of the United States to Ecuador

Political offices
Preceded by John Trumbull Van Alen	U.S. Chargé d'Affaires, Ecuador; 1851–1853	Succeeded by Philo White
