= Adam Namm =

American diplomat

Adam E. Namm
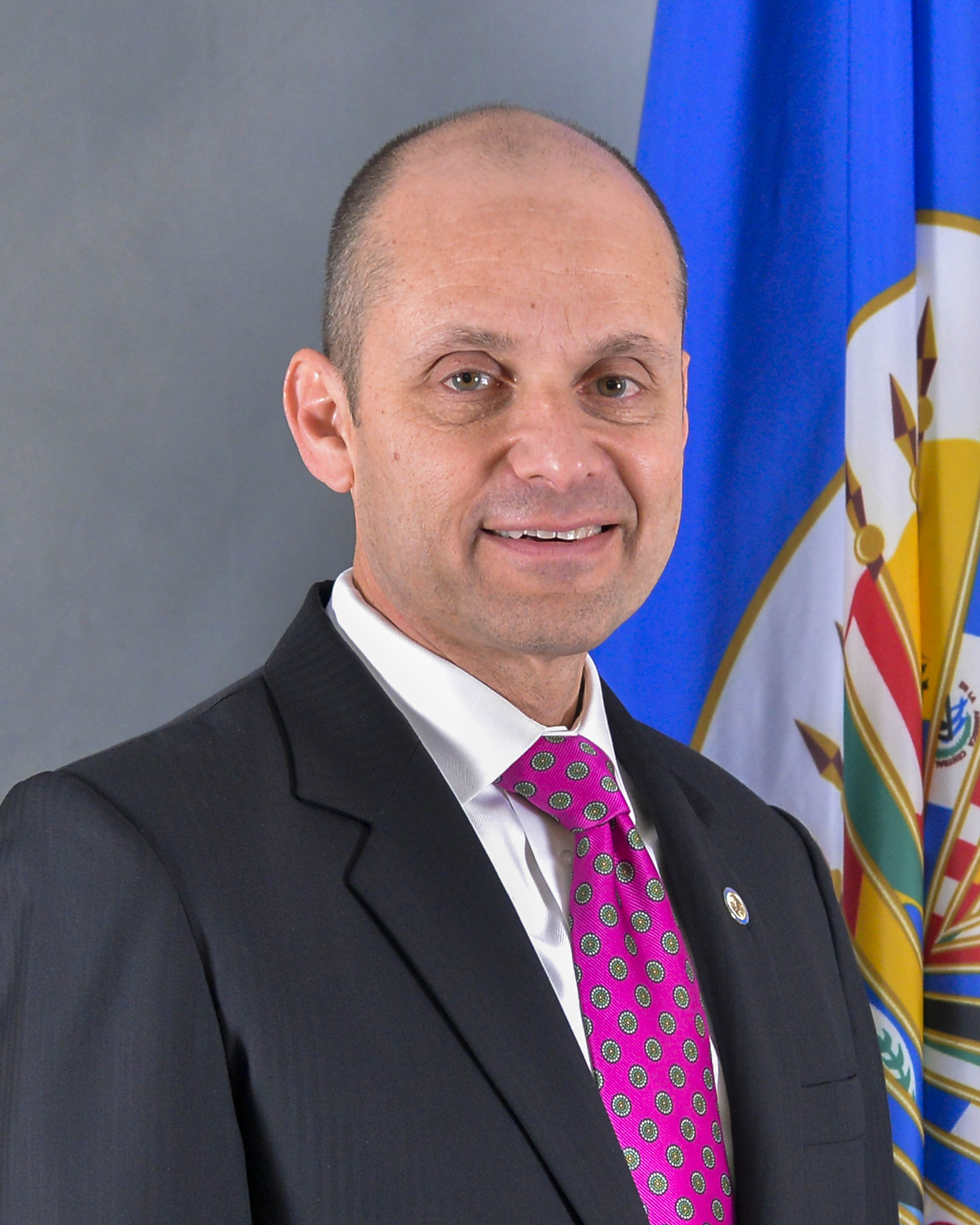

Executive Secretary of the Inter-American Drug Abuse Control Commission (CICAD)
- In office December 1, 2016 – May 25, 2025
- Succeeded by: Angela Crowdy (acting)

United States Ambassador to Ecuador
- In office June 22, 2012 – September 30, 2015
- President: Barack Obama
- Preceded by: Heather Hodges
- Succeeded by: Todd C. Chapman

Personal details
- Born: 1963 (age 62–63) White Plains, New York
- Spouses: Peg Willingham (m. 1992) Mei Huang (m. 2009)
- Children: 2
- Education: Phillips Academy; Brown University; National Defense University

Adam E. Namm (born 1963) is a former career American Diplomat who served as U.S. Ambassador to Ecuador from 2012 to 2015 and before that as Director of the State Department's Bureau of Overseas Buildings Operations. Before retiring from the U.S. Foreign Service in 2016, Namm served as Director of the State Department's Office of Management Policy, Rightsizing, and Innovation. After retirement from the State Department, Namm was Executive Secretary of the Inter-American Drug Abuse Control Commission (CICAD) of the Organization of American States (OAS) from 2016 to 2025.

== Education and early career ==
A native of White Plains, New York, Namm graduated from Phillips Academy (high school) in 1981, holds an A.B. magna cum laude in International Relations from Brown University, and an M.S. in National Security Strategy from the National War College. He spent his junior year of college studying in Paris, France with IES Abroad. He speaks Spanish and French. Before entering the U.S. Foreign Service, Namm worked as a marketing consultant in the field of fiberoptics.

== Diplomatic career ==
Namm entered the U.S. Foreign Service in 1987 and served tours in Santo Domingo, Dominican Republic, Dhahran, Saudi Arabia, Bogota, Colombia, and Islamabad, Pakistan, as well as in various domestic assignments. As the Director of the Bureau of Overseas Buildings Operations (OBO) in Washington, D.C., he managed an annual budget of more than $2 billion and oversaw the opening of 24 U.S. diplomatic facilities.

He was nominated to be U.S. Ambassador to Ecuador by Barack Obama on September 6, 2011, and confirmed by the Senate on April 26, 2012. He arrived in Quito on May 30, 2012, and concluded his tenure as ambassador on September 30, 2015. While ambassador, Namm drew public attention for performing in a band of local musicians. Namm said that playing music was "a great way to connect" with local Ecuadorians and also performed with Ecuadorian Minister of Foreign Affairs Ricardo Patiño.

== Organization of American States (OAS) ==
Namm was appointed Executive Secretary of the Organization of American States Inter-American Drug Abuse Control Commission Inter-American Drug Abuse Control Commission (CICAD) on December 1, 2016. As CICAD Executive Secretariat, Namm supported the commission in strengthening its capacity for channeling the collective efforts of its member states to reduce the production, trafficking, and use of illegal drugs. Namm concluded his tenure as Executive Secretary of CICAD on May 25, 2025.

Diplomatic posts
Preceded by Heather Hodges	United States Ambassador to Ecuador; 2012–2015	Succeeded by Todd C. Chapman
