= Montgomery Schuyler Jr. =

American diplomat & banker (1877–1955)

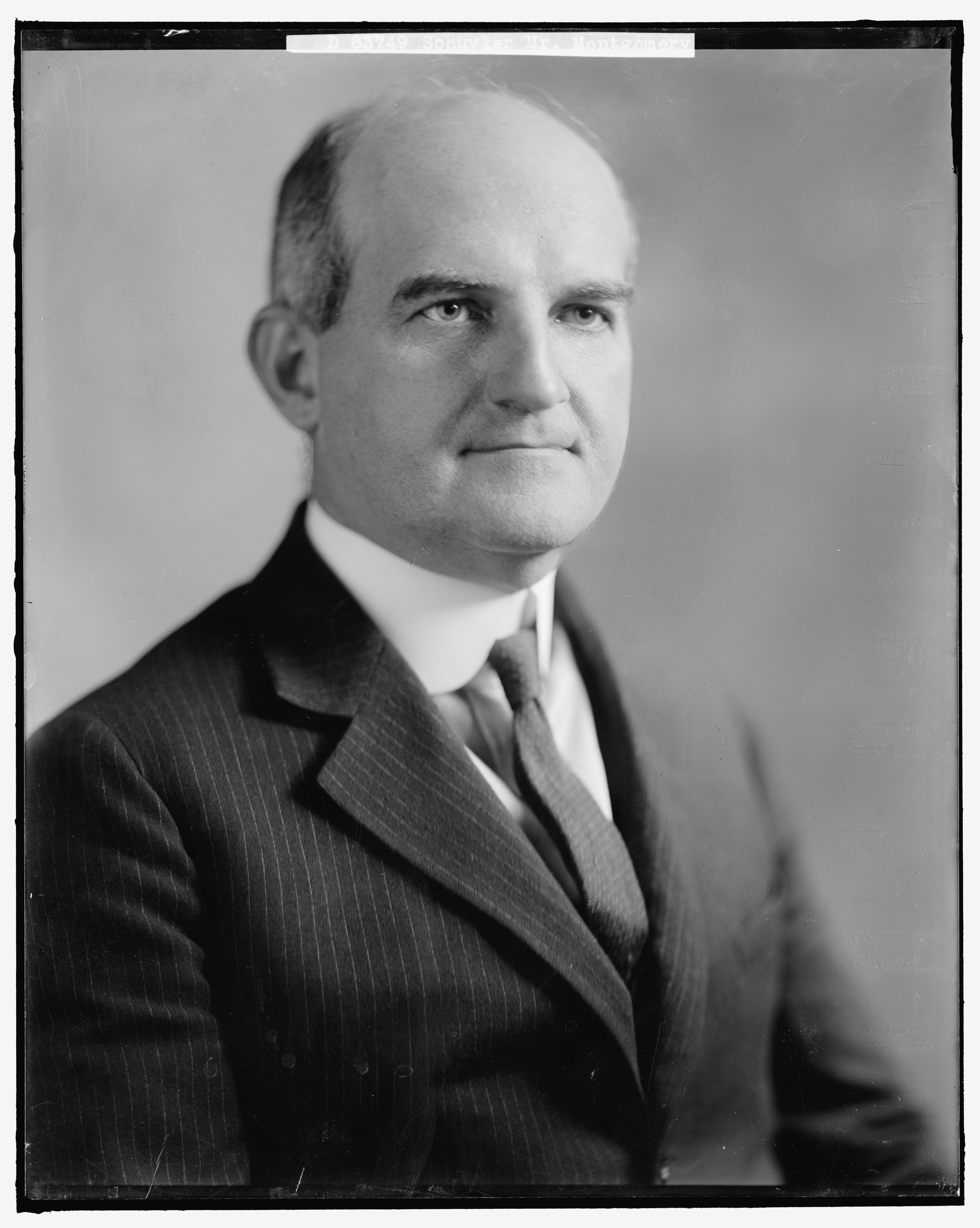

U.S. Minister to El Salvador
- In office July 12, 1921 – April 22, 1925
- President: Warren G. Harding
- Preceded by: Peter Augustus Jay
- Succeeded by: Jefferson Caffery

U.S. Minister to Ecuador
- In office May 24, 1913 – September 29, 1913
- President: Woodrow Wilson
- Preceded by: Evan E. Young
- Succeeded by: Charles S. Hartman

Personal details
- Born: September 2, 1877 Stamford, Connecticut, U.S.
- Died: November 1, 1955 (aged 78) New York City, New York, U.S.
- Spouse: Edith Lawver (m. 1906)
- Relations: Robert Livingston Schuyler (brother)
- Parent(s): Montgomery Schuyler; Katherine Beeckman Livingston
- Education: Trinity School
- Alma mater: Columbia University

Montgomery Schuyler Jr. (September 2, 1877 – November 1, 1955) was an American diplomat and banker who served as United States Envoy to Ecuador and El Salvador.

== Early life ==
Schuyler was born on September 2, 1877, in Stamford, Connecticut. He was the son of Montgomery Schuyler (1842–1914) and Katherine Beeckman (née Livingston) Schuyler (1842–1914). His younger brother was Robert Livingston Schuyler (1883–1966), who served as president of the American Historical Association.

His paternal grandparents were Eleanor (née Johnson) Schuyler (1818–1849) and the Rev. Dr. Anthony Schuyler (1816–1900), one time rector of the Protestant Episcopal Church Grace Church in Orange, New Jersey. The Schuylers were one of the oldest families in New York, descendants of Philip Pieterse Schuyler, who settled in Beverwyck (now Albany, New York) in 1650, through his son Arent Schuyler (1662–1730) and his son Casparus Schuyler (1695–1754). Through his maternal side, he was a direct descendant of Robert Livingston the Elder, the first Lord of Livingston Manor.

Schuyler attended Trinity School in New York's Upper West Side. He received a B.A. and M.A. from Columbia University in 1899 and 1900.

== Career ==
In 1902, he began his diplomatic career when was appointed Second Secretary to the U.S. legation in St. Petersburg, Russia by President Theodore Roosevelt. Two years later, he was assigned as the secretary to the U.S. Consul General in Bangkok, Thailand. In 1906, he was transferred as chargé d'affaires to Romania and Serbia.

In 1907, Schuyler was again assigned to St. Petersburg as first secretary and chargé d'affaires, staying in this role until 1909 when he became the first secretary of the American Embassy in Tokyo, Japan. His time in Tokyo was followed by another first secretary position in the American Embassy of Mexico.

In 1913, Schuyler was promoted to Minister when he was appointed by President Woodrow Wilson as Envoy Extraordinary and Minister Plenipotentiary to Ecuador, serving from May 24, 1913, and until September 29, 1913. He again served in Russia from 1914 to 1915 until the outbreak of World War I.

=== World War I ===
During World War I, Schuyler was a captain in the Ordnance Department and was in the Intelligence Division of the General Staff. In 1918, he became chief intelligence officer of the American Expeditionary Force at Omsk in Siberia, Russia, following the Bolshevik Revolution. He was honorably discharged in 1919 with the rank of Major.

Following the conclusion of World War I, he reentered the diplomatic service and from July 12, 1921, until April 22, 1925, served as Envoy Extraordinary and Minister Plenipotentiary to El Salvador under President Warren G. Harding.

=== Later career ===
Following his retirement from the diplomatic service, he became a partner with Schuyler, Earl & Co. stockbrokers. He also served as president and chairman of the executive committee of the National Bank of Yorkville, vice president of the Century Bank, president of Roosevelt & Schuyler, Ltd., and a director of several banks including the Manufacturers Trust Company.

Schuyler also served as a president of the Order of Colonial Lords of Manors.

== Personal life ==
On August 22, 1906, Schuyler was married to Edith Lawver (1877–1964). She was the daughter of Dr. W. P. Lawver and the niece of Charles Schneider of Washington, D.C. Together, they lived at 622 West 137 Street in New York City.

Schuyler died on November 1, 1955. He was interred in Green-Wood Cemetery in Brooklyn, New York.

Diplomatic posts
Preceded by Evan E. Young	United States Envoy to Ecuador; May 24, 1913 – September 29, 1913	Succeeded by Charles S. Hartman
Preceded by Peter Augustus Jay	U.S. Minister to El Salvador; July 12, 1921 – April 22, 1925	Succeeded by Jefferson Caffery
