= John Trumbull Van Alen =

American merchant and diplomat

Chargé d'Affaires to Ecuador
- In office June 5, 1849 – August 1850
- President: Zachary Taylor
- Preceded by: Van Brugh Livingston
- Succeeded by: Courtland Cushing

Personal details
- Died: August 27, 1857 Poughkeepsie, New York, U.S.

John Trumbull Van Alen (died August 27, 1857) was an American merchant and diplomat who served as the American Chargé d'affaires to Ecuador from June 5, 1849 to August 1850.

== Biography ==
Colonel Van Alen, a native of New York who worked as a merchant, was appointed by President Zachary Taylor to succeed fellow New Yorker, Van Brugh Livingston, as the Chargé d'Affaires to Ecuador in Quito, in a recess appointment, on June 5, 1849. Van Alen had helped Taylor get elected to the presidency and "enjoyed a greater degree of the old veteran's confidence and affection than almost any other person not of his immediate kindred."

He presented his credentials on November 19, 1849, Van Alen, who was known as "callow and impulsive," reportedly "lacked experience in diplomacy and knowledge of Ecuadorian politics," and "decided that Ecuador could be rescued from ruin only by General Flores," the former president of Ecuador. He wrote to Washington advising them that Flores was popular and had been "unjustly ousted by a small clique of opportunists." While in Ecuador, he was able to negotiate a treaty regarding the brig Morris which was captured and sold by the authorities of Colombia.

Van Alen's last dispatch at his post was on July 18, 1850, before he resigned in October 1850 due to illness. Van Alen was recommissioned on August 10, 1850, after confirmation, but did not serve under his second appointment. Eventually he was succeeded by Courtland Cushing of Indiana who was commissioned on September 28, 1850.

After his retirement from the diplomatic services, he spent several years abroad, mostly in England.

Upon his return to the United States, he purchased a country estate near Poughkeepsie, New York, where he died on August 27, 1857.

== See also ==
- List of ambassadors of the United States to Ecuador

Political offices
Preceded by Van Brugh Livingston	U.S. Chargé d'Affaires, Ecuador; 1849–1850	Succeeded by Courtland Cushing
