= John T. Chain Jr. =

U.S. Air Force General (1934–2021)

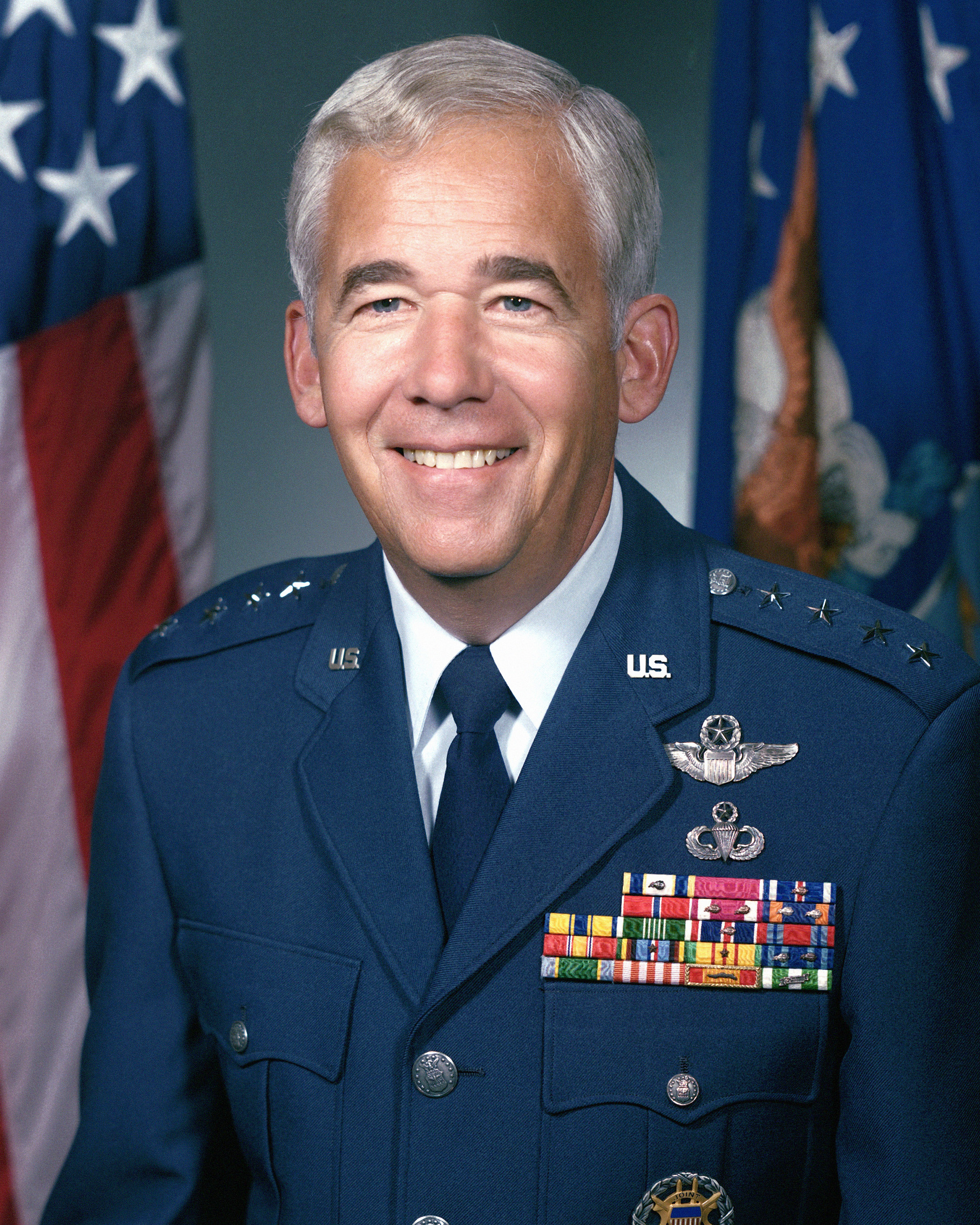
- Born: December 11, 1934; Wilmington, Delaware, U.S.
- Died: July 7, 2021 (aged 86)
- Burial place: Arlington National Cemetery
- Military career
- Allegiance: United States
- Branch: United States Air Force
- Service years: 1957–1991
- Rank: General
- Nickname: Jack
- Commands: Strategic Air Command
- Conflicts: Vietnam War; Cold War
- Awards: Defense Distinguished Service Medal; Distinguished Service Medal (2); Legion of Merit; Distinguished Flying Cross (2); Bronze Star
- Other work: Member of the Board of Directors, Northrop Grumman; Director, R. J. Reynolds Tobacco Company; Director, ConAgra Foods, Inc. Director, Kemper Insurance Company; Director, James S. Kemper Foundation; Member, Council on Foreign Relations; Executive Vice President, Burlington Northern Railroad

John T. Chain Jr.

8th Director of the Bureau of Political-Military Affairs
- In office July 1, 1984 – June 14, 1985
- Preceded by: Jonathan Howe
- Succeeded by: H. Allen Holmes

John Thomas Chain Jr. (December 11, 1934 – July 7, 2021) was a U.S. Air Force general. He was also a director of R. J. Reynolds Tobacco Company, ConAgra Foods, Inc., and Kemper Insurance Co., as well as holding other corporate offices.

== Early life ==
Chain was born in Wilmington, Delaware, attended high school at Fork Union Military Academy and was a member of Fork Union Chapter of DeMolay International. He earned a Bachelor of Arts degree in history in 1956 and was awarded an honorary doctorate in humane letters in 1990, both from Denison University. While at Denison University, General Chain was a member of the Sigma Alpha Epsilon fraternity. In 1971 he graduated from the National War College and concurrently earned a master's degree in international affairs from George Washington University.

== Air Force career ==
John Chain had a wide and varied military career, serving in a number of powerful positions. He accrued over 5,000 flying hours (including 400 combat hours) in more than 45 different military aircraft. He is a master parachutist with 66 jumps, and has been awarded the Air Force Distinguished Service Medal, the Legion of Merit, the Distinguished Flying Cross, and the Bronze Star.

Chain was commissioned as a second lieutenant through the Air Force Reserve Officer Training Corps program. He received his pilot wings in 1957 and then entered combat crew training. From 1958 to 1959 the general was an F-100 Super Sabre pilot at Toul-Rosières Air Base in France, and from 1959 to 1962 at Ramstein Air Base in West Germany. General Chain then served as a flight examiner at Cannon Air Force Base, New Mexico. In 1964 he was assigned as a forward air controller in Fort Campbell, Kentucky. While there he became a master parachutist and flew Army O-1s and Air National Guard F-84 Thunderjets.

In 1966 Chain flew combat missions while assigned to Tan Son Nhut Air Base in South Vietnam. He then transferred to Washington, D.C. From 1969 to 1970, Chain was an exchange officer with the U.S. Department of State. He entered the National War College in 1970 and upon graduation was assigned to Davis-Monthan Air Force Base in Arizona as deputy commander for operations. In 1972 he became deputy commander for logistics.

In 1972 and 1973, Chain flew combat missions in F-4 Phantoms from Korat Royal Thai Air Force Base in Thailand. Upon his return to the United States in 1973, he became deputy commander for operations at George Air Force Base, California. In 1974 he was assigned as vice commander at Nellis Air Force Base, Nevada, where he flew as an aggressor pilot. He then transferred to Tactical Air Command at Langley Air Force Base in 1975 as director of fighter and reconnaissance operations. In 1976 and 1977 he was assistant to the commander there.

Chain became the military assistant to the Secretary of the Air Force in 1978. He then served as deputy director of plans at Air Force headquarters until 1980, when he became director of operations. Chain was assigned as assistant deputy chief of staff for plans and operations in 1981 and became deputy chief of staff for plans and operations in 1982. He served as director of the Bureau of Political-Military Affairs for the Department of State from 1984 until 1985, when he became chief of staff for Supreme Headquarters Allied Powers Europe in Belgium.

On July 1, 1985, Chain was promoted to general. In 1986 he became commander in chief of Strategic Air Command, where he oversaw the LGM-118A Peacekeeper operations for the Reagan Administration. He retired from the military on January 31, 1991.

== Civilian career ==
After his retirement from the Air Force, Chain devoted himself full-time to corporate management. In March 1991 he became executive vice president for Burlington Northern Railroad, a position he held for five years. He was also special assistant to the chairman of that company in 1995 and 1996. In 1996 he became president of Quarterdeck Equity Partners, a subsidiary of Quarterdeck Investment Partners, Inc., a position he held until 2002. Chain became a member of the board of directors of Thomas Group, a management consulting company, in 1995, and was elevated to chairman of the board in 1998. He is also a director of RJ Reynolds, Inc., ConAgra Foods, Inc. and Kemper Insurance Co.. Chain's also serves as a board member of Northrop Grumman, one of the world's largest defense contractors. He gained this position in 1991 and oversaw the company's dramatic growth throughout the 1990s.

John Chain was active in politics, though mostly behind the scenes. He was a Bush Pioneer in 2000, meaning that he gathered $100,000 for George W. Bush's 2000 presidential campaign. He was also a member of the Council on Foreign Relations.

Chain died in his sleep at the age of 86 in July 2021.

Government offices
Preceded by Jonathan Howe	Director of the Bureau of Politico-Military Affairs; July 1, 1984 – June 14, 1985	Succeeded by H. Allen Holmes
Military offices
Preceded by Gen. Larry D. Welch	Commander, Strategic Air Command; 1986—1991	Succeeded by Gen. George Lee Butler
