= Richard J. Bloomfield =

American diplomat (1927–2011)

United States Ambassador to Ecuador
- In office April 6, 1976 – January 21, 1978
- Appointed by: Gerald Ford, Jimmy Carter
- Preceded by: Robert C. Brewster
- Succeeded by: Raymond E. Gonzalez

United States Ambassador to Portugal
- In office February 3, 1978 – June 10, 1982
- Appointed by: Jimmy Carter
- Preceded by: Frank Carlucci
- Succeeded by: H. Allen Holmes

Personal details
- Born: August 27, 1927
- Died: November 22, 2011 (aged 84)
- Education: Edmund A. Walsh School of Foreign Service; Harvard Kennedy School

Richard Joseph Bloomfield (August 27, 1927 – November 22, 2011) was an American diplomat who served as United States Ambassador to Ecuador from 1976 to 1978 and as United States Ambassador to Portugal from 1978 to 1982. He was executive director of the World Peace Foundation from 1982 to 1992.

== Career ==
After graduating from the Edmund A. Walsh School of Foreign Service in 1950 and serving in the U.S. Air Force, Bloomfield joined the U.S. Foreign Service in 1952. As well as various postings in Latin America he was Director of the Office of Policy Planning and Coordination at the Bureau of Inter-American Affairs (1973-1976), before being appointed United States Ambassador to Ecuador (1976-1978) and United States Ambassador to Portugal (1978-1982).

After retiring from the U.S. Foreign Service in 1982 Bloomfield became executive director of the World Peace Foundation (1982-1992), before becoming a senior visiting fellow at Brown University.

Diplomatic posts
Preceded by Robert C. Brewster	United States Ambassador to Ecuador; 1976–1978	Succeeded by Raymond E. Gonzalez
Preceded by Frank C. Carlucci	United States Ambassador to Portugal; 1978–1982	Succeeded by Henry Allen Holmes
