= Daniel N. Lockwood =

American politician

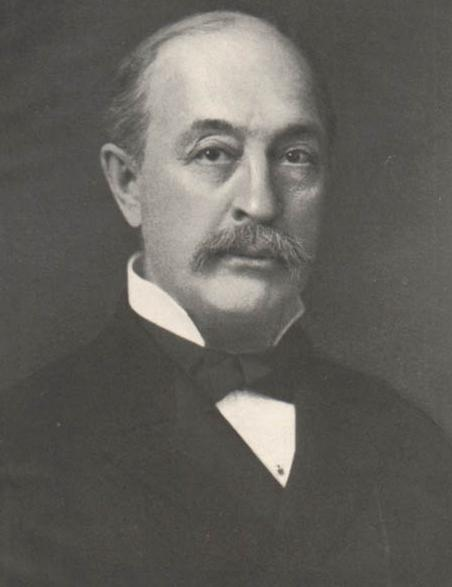

Member of the U.S. House of Representatives from New York's 32nd district
- In office March 4, 1891 – March 3, 1895
- Preceded by: John M. Farquhar
- Succeeded by: Rowland B. Mahany
- In office March 4, 1877 – March 3, 1879
- Preceded by: Lyman K. Bass
- Succeeded by: Ray V. Pierce

United States Attorney for the Northern District of New York
- In office October 23, 1886 – June 5, 1889
- President: Grover Cleveland
- Preceded by: Martin I. Townsend
- Succeeded by: De Alva S. Alexander

18th District Attorney of Erie County, New York
- In office January 1, 1875 – October 1, 1877
- Preceded by: Benjamin H. Williams
- Succeeded by: Robert C. Titus

Personal details
- Born: Daniel Newton Lockwood; June 1, 1841 Hamburg, New York, U.S.
- Died: June 1, 1906 (aged 65) Buffalo, New York, U.S.
- Party: Democratic
- Spouse: Sarah Brown (m. 1870; died 1898)
- Education: Union College
- Occupation: Lawyer, politician

Daniel Newton Lockwood (June 1, 1841 – June 1, 1906) was an American lawyer, politician from New York, and the 18th District Attorney of Erie County, New York. He served a total of three terms in the U.S. House of Representatives from 1877 to 1879, then again from 1891 to 1895.

== Life ==
Lockwood was born on June 1, 1841, in rural town of Hamburg, New York. He was the son of Martha (née Phillips) Lockwood and Harrison Lockwood. He was the grandson of Ebenezer Lockwood, and great-grandson of Timothy Lockwood, who fought in the American Revolutionary War.

As a boy, he was poor and his father died early so he had to move in with his relative, Timothy T. Lockwood, the Mayor of Buffalo from 1858 to 1859. Through hardship, he managed to obtain a common school education. In 1865, he graduated from Union College in Schenectady, where he became a member of the Alpha charge of Theta Delta Chi fraternity.

== Career ==
After graduating from Union College, he studied law in the office of Judge James M. Humphrey, was admitted to the New York bar in 1866, and commenced practice in Buffalo, New York, under Humphrey, Lockwood & Hoyt. He was District Attorney of Erie County from January 1, 1875, until October 1, 1877.

=== Tenure in Congress ===
Lockwood was elected as a Democrat to the 43rd United States Congress, and served from March 4, 1877, to March 3, 1879. He was a delegate to the 1880 and 1884 Democratic National Conventions. In 1884, he nominated Grover Cleveland, his closest friend, for President. Lockwood was appointed the United States Attorney for the Northern District of New York by President Cleveland, and served from 1886 to 1889.

Lockwood was elected again to the 52nd and 53rd United States Congresses, and served from March 4, 1891, to March 3, 1895. While serving in Congress, in 1894, he ran for Lieutenant Governor of New York on three Democratic tickets with David B. Hill and Everett P. Wheeler for Governor, but was defeated by Republican Charles T. Saxton. Lockwood was a delegate to the 1896 Democratic National Convention.

=== Later career ===
After the end of his political career he resumed his law practice before being selected by then New York Governor Theodore Roosevelt to serve as the general manager from New York at the Pan-American Exposition in 1901, the site of William McKinley's assassination.

He also served as president and manager of the Akron Cement Works, the Buffalo Sewer Pipe Company, and the Buffalo, New York & Erie Railroad Company. He was a director of the New York and New Jersey Bridge Company and the Merchants' Bank and the Third National Bank.

In 1903, Lockwood was appointed by Governor Benjamin Odell to the New York State Lunacy Commission, a position which he held until his death.

== Personal life ==
On October 18, 1870, Lockwood was married to Sarah Brown (1847–1898), daughter of Thomas Brown. He lived in a mansion on Niagara Street in Buffalo. Together, they were the parents of two children:

- Elizabeth Lockwood (1873–1919), who married Bronson C. Rumsey (1851–1946) in 1899.
- Thomas Brown Lockwood (1873–1947), who married Marion Birge, sister-in-law of George Cary, in 1904. He unsuccessfully ran for Lieutenant Governor of New York in 1914.

Lockwood died on his birthday at his home in Buffalo, New York, on June 1, 1906, after suffering from diabetes and gangrene. He was buried at the Forest Lawn Cemetery in Buffalo.

U.S. House of Representatives
Preceded by Lyman K. Bass	Member of the U.S. House of Representatives from New York's 32nd congressional district 1877–1879	Succeeded by Ray V. Pierce
Preceded by John M. Farquhar	Member of the U.S. House of Representatives from New York's 32nd congressional district 1891–1895	Succeeded by Rowland B. Mahany
