= Robert C. Brewster =

American diplomat

Robert Charles Brewster

United States Ambassador to Ecuador
- In office October 1, 1973 – April 8, 1976
- President: Richard Nixon
- Preceded by: Findley Burns Jr.
- Succeeded by: Richard J. Bloomfield

10th Inspector General of the Department of State
- In office January 15, 1979 – January 18, 1981
- President: Jimmy Carter
- Preceded by: Theodore L. Eliot Jr.
- Succeeded by: Robert Lyle Brown

Personal details
- Born: 1921
- Died: December 20, 2009 (aged 87–88)
- Spouse: Mary
- Education: Grinnell College, University of Washington, Columbia University
- Profession: Diplomat

Robert Charles Brewster (1921 - December 20, 2009 Washington, DC) was the American Ambassador to Ecuador from 1973 until 1976 and Inspector General of the Department of State from 1979 until 1981. During his tenure as ambassador, the US lifted the ban on military sales to Ecuador “in an effort to improve relations with Latin America.”

== Biography ==
Ambassador Brewster attended Grinnell College before transferring to the University of Washington, Class of 1943. He enlisted in the Navy and went to Midshipman's School at Columbia before being assigned to the USS O'Brien (DD-415). When he returned from the Navy, he studied international affairs at Columbia University for two years.

Brewster died at the age of 88 at a retirement community in Washington having suffered from Parkinson's Disease and stomach cancer. He was a native of Beatrice, Nebraska.
