= Victor Willard =

American politician (1813–1869)

Member of the Wisconsin Senate from the 17th district
- In office January 1, 1849 – January 6, 1851
- Preceded by: Philo White
- Succeeded by: Stephen O. Bennett

Personal details
- Born: October 29, 1813 Monroe County, New York, U.S.
- Died: December 10, 1869 (aged 56) Waterford, Wisconsin, U.S.
- Cause of death: Tuberculosis
- Party: Free Soil Party
- Spouse: Jane Nancy Gault (m. 1839–1869)
- Children: Charles Duane Willard^{(b. 1840; died 1930)}; Julia Melinda (Vinson)^{(b. 1842; died 1931)}; Emma Josephine Willard^{(b. 1846; died 1876)}; Albert Monroe Willard^{(b. 1847; died 1921)}; Viola Lucretia (Parker)^{(b. 1850; died 1889)}; Calvin Gault Willard^{(b. 1851; died 1901)}; Clara Eva (Bain)^{(b. 1854; died 1908)}; Clarence Emery Willard^{(b. 1854)}; Ella Willard^{(b. 1855; died 1859)}; Fred Anson Willard^{(b. 1858; died 1918)}; Douglas Jerome Willard^{(b. 1860; died 1862)}; Adele Jane (Buzzo) (Griffith)^{(b. 1862; died 1931)}

Military service
- Allegiance: United States
- Branch/service: United States Volunteers; Union Army
- Years of service: 1861–1862
- Rank: Private
- Unit: 15th Reg. Wis. Vol. Infantry
- Battles/wars: American Civil War

Victor Mauro Willard (October 29, 1813 – December 10, 1869) was an American farmer, politician, and Wisconsin pioneer. He served as a delegate to Wisconsin's first constitutional convention and was a member of the Wisconsin State Senate in 1849 and 1850, representing Racine County.

== Biography ==
Born in New York, Willard moved to the town of Waterford in the Wisconsin Territory in 1837. He was elected as a delegate of Racine County to Wisconsin's first constitutional convention in 1846. At the convention, he worked on the committee to draft an act of congress which would ratify the admission of the state. However, the constitutional document produced by the first convention was ultimately rejected by the voters of Wisconsin.

In 1848, Willard was elected to the Wisconsin State Senate on the Free Soil Party ticket for the 1849 and 1850 sessions. He represented the 17th state Senate district which at that time comprised the territory making up present-day Racine County—in 1849, this was only the northern half of Racine County. Kenosha County was created from the southern half of Racine County in 1850.

Willard died of tuberculosis on December 10, 1869.

== Personal life and family ==
Victor Willard was the second of 10 children born to Anson Willard (1786–1850) and his wife Lucretia (née Baker; 1792–1885). The Willard family were descendants of the English colonist Simon Willard, who settled in the Massachusetts Bay Colony in 1634.

On October 2, 1839, Victor Willard married Jane Nancy Gault, who had emigrated to Racine County with her parents from Vermont. Victor and Jane had 12 children, though at least two died in infancy.

Two of their sons served in the Union Army during the Civil War; Charles D. Willard was a first lieutenant in the 19th Wisconsin Infantry Regiment; Albert M. Willard was a private in the 43rd Wisconsin Infantry Regiment.

Wisconsin Senate
Preceded by Philo White	Member of the Wisconsin Senate from the 17th district January 1, 1849 – January 6, 1851	Succeeded by Stephen O. Bennett
