= Michael J. Fitzpatrick (diplomat) =

American diplomat

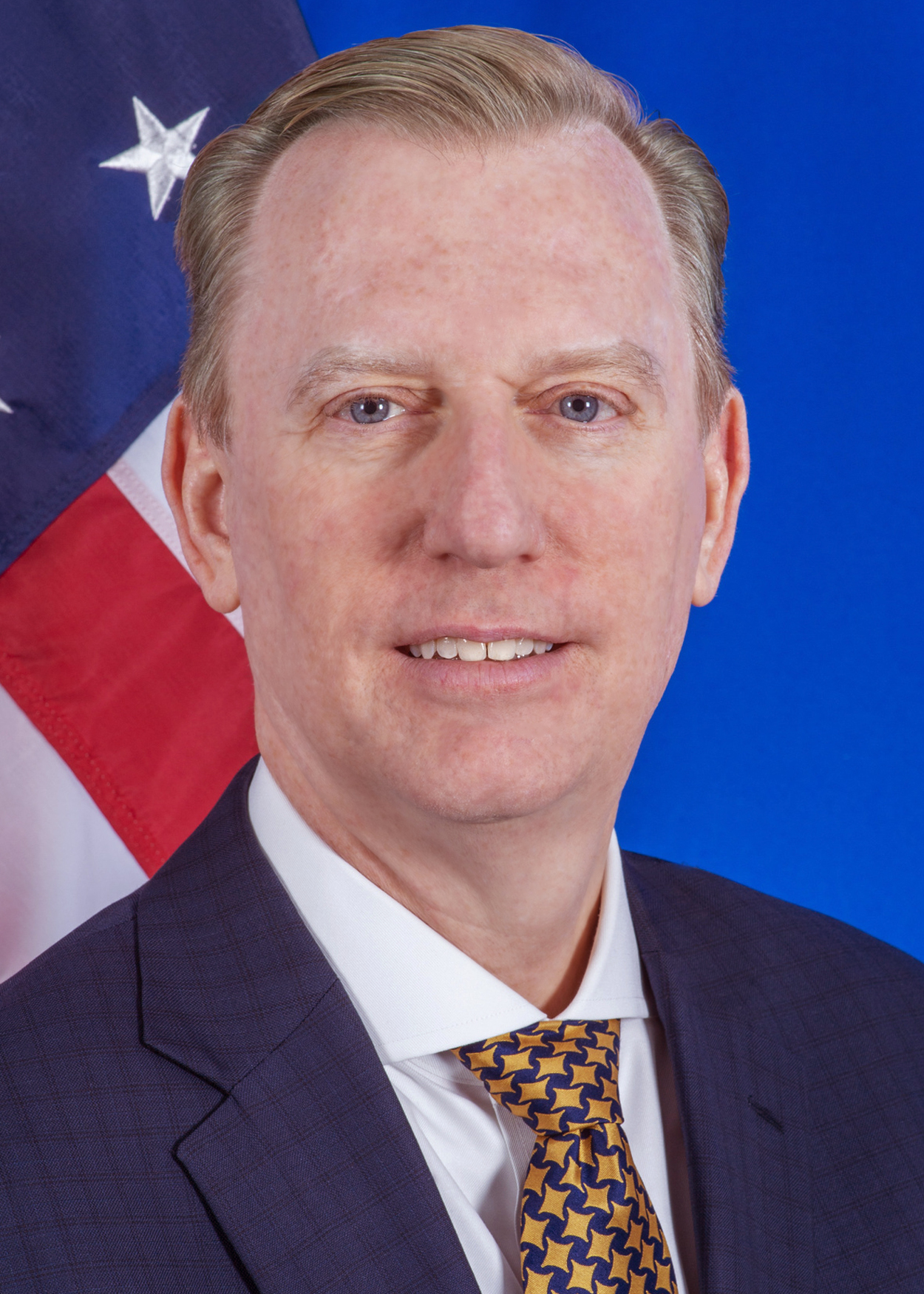

United States Ambassador to Ecuador
- In office July 3, 2019 – June 15, 2024
- President: Donald Trump; Joe Biden
- Preceded by: Todd C. Chapman
- Succeeded by: Arthur W. Brown

Personal details
- Education: Georgetown University (BA); Columbia University (MIA)

Michael J. Fitzpatrick is an American diplomat who served as the United States ambassador to Ecuador from 2019 to 2024.

== Early life and education ==
Fitzpatrick earned a Bachelor of Arts from Georgetown University and a Master of International Affairs from Columbia University.

== Career ==
Fitzpatrick is a career member of the Senior Foreign Service, class of Minister-Counselor. He has served as an American diplomat since 1988. His career has spanned seven tours at U.S. Missions overseas and in senior leadership positions at the Department of State, including as the interim U.S. Permanent Representative to the Organization of American States, Deputy Chief of Mission and Chargé d'Affaires at the U.S. Embassy in Lima, Peru, Foreign Policy Advisor to a four-star member of the Joint Chiefs of Staff, and Deputy Chief of Mission and Chargé d'Affaires at the U.S. Embassy in Asuncion, Paraguay as well as a Deputy Assistant Secretary for Western Hemisphere Affairs. He began his government service in 1986, as a Presidential Management Fellow in the State Department's Office of Policy Planning and Coordination in the Bureau of Western Hemisphere Affairs.

On August 16, 2018, President Donald Trump announced his intent to nominate Fitzpatrick to be the next United States Ambassador to Ecuador. On May 23, 2019 his nomination was confirmed by voice vote in the United States Senate. He presented his credentials to President Lenín Moreno on July 3, 2019. He left his post on June 15, 2024.

== Awards ==
He is the recipient of 17 notable State Department awards, including the Director General's Award for Reporting and Analysis. He is also a recipient of the W. Averell Harriman Award from the American Foreign Service Association.

== Personal life ==
Fitzpatrick speaks Spanish and French.

Diplomatic posts
Preceded by Todd C. Chapman	United States Ambassador to Ecuador; 2019–2024	Succeeded by Arthur W. Brown
