= Findley Burns Jr. =

American Foreign Service officer, Vice Consul and ambassador

Findley with Ecuadorian President José María Ibarra in 1970

Findley Burns Jr. (May 4, 1917, in Baltimore, MD – October 14, 2003, in Southern Pines, NC) was an American Foreign Service officer, Vice Consul, and Ambassador.

A graduate of Princeton University (1939), Burns attended Harvard from 1950 to 1951 and was a student at the National War College in Washington from 1961 to 1962. He was a member of the International Institute for Strategic Studies in London.

Burns entered the Foreign Service in 1941. Some of his early assignments were in Madrid, Brussels, Warsaw, London, and Vienna. He later served as ambassador to Jordan (where he was stationed during the June 1967 Six-Day War), and he also served as an ambassador to Ecuador in 1970.

From 1974 to 1980, he worked at the United Nations in New York, where he was director of the office of Technical Cooperation.

Diplomatic posts
| Preceded by Robert G. Barnes | United States Ambassador to Jordan; 1966–1967 | Succeeded by L. Dean Brown] |
| Preceded by Edson O. Sessions | United States Ambassador to Ecuador; 1970–1973 | Succeeded by Robert C. Brewster |
