= Arthur W. Brown =

American diplomat

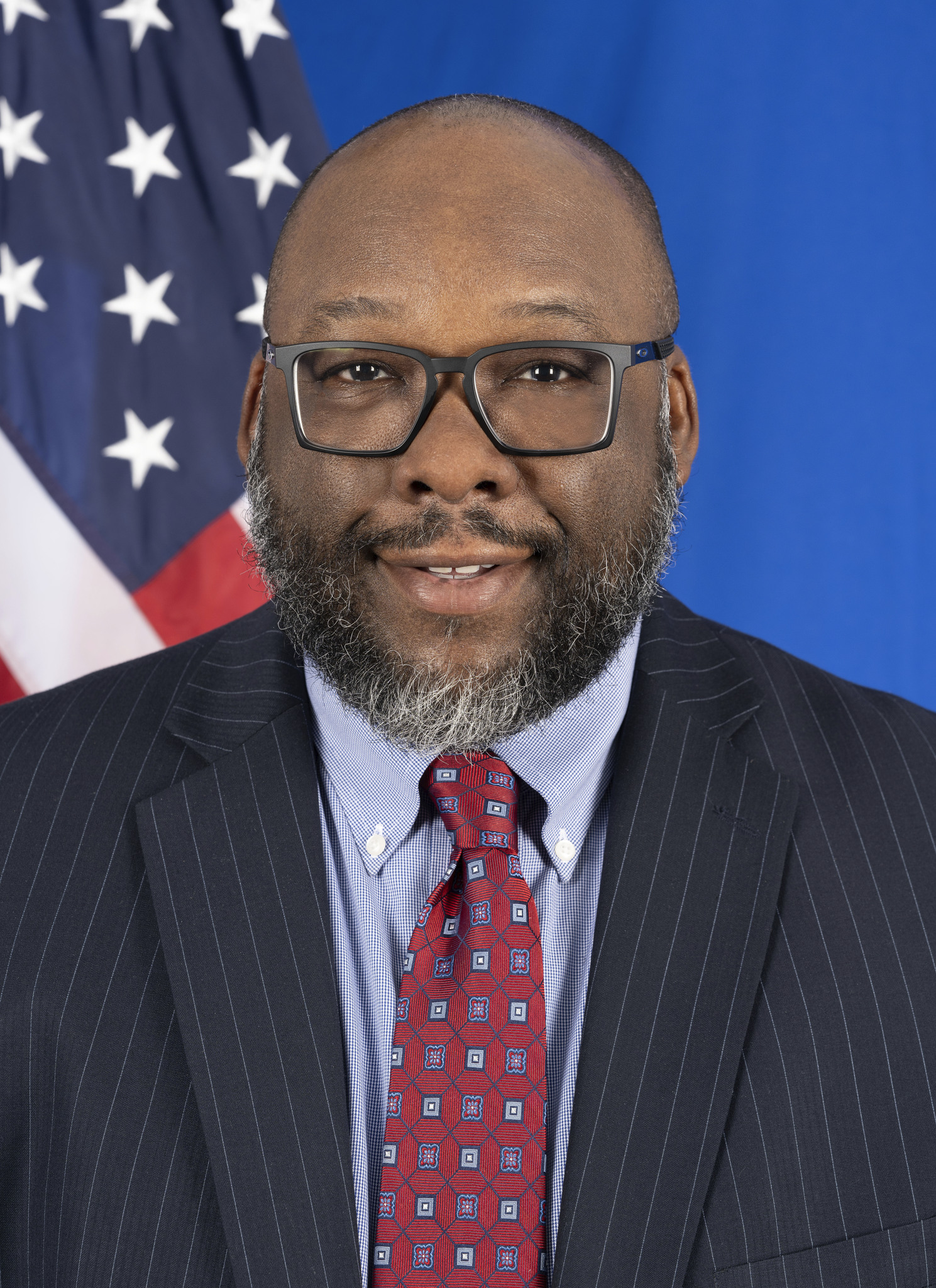

United States Ambassador to Ecuador
- In office June 26, 2024 – April 17, 2025
- President: Joe Biden; Donald Trump
- Preceded by: Michael J. Fitzpatrick

Personal details
- Education: University of Virginia (BA); National War College (MS); Johns Hopkins University (MBA)

Arthur W. Brown is an American diplomat who served as the United States ambassador to Ecuador from 2024-2025.

== Early life and education ==
Arthur Brown received a Master of Business Administration degree from Johns Hopkins University, a Bachelor of Arts degree from the University of Virginia, and a Master of Science degree in National Security Strategy from the National War College.

== Career ==
Brown is a career member of the Senior Foreign Service with the rank of Minister-Counselor. He served as deputy chief of mission at the U.S. Embassy in Harare, Zimbabwe from 2021. He was the USAID mission director at the embassy in Harare from 2020 to 2021.

Prior to that position, Brown served as the USAID director in the Dominican Republic for four years, with almost half the tenure working with the Department of State as deputy chief of mission at the U.S. Embassy in Santo Domingo. Brown has also served as USAID director at the U.S. Embassy in Managua, Nicaragua. Additionally, Brown served in Kabul, Afghanistan and in Kinshasa, Democratic Republic of the Congo as USAID's deputy director. Other assignments for Brown include serving in various roles in Botswana, Guinea, Nigeria, Sierra Leone, Haiti, Jamaica, Barbados, and Namibia.

Before his tenure with USAID, Brown worked for Johns Hopkins University's JHPIEGO Corporation, a nonprofit organization for international health, on international maternal and child health programs. Brown also served as a rural community development extension agent in Benin, where he was a Peace Corps volunteer.

=== U.S. ambassador to Ecuador ===
On August 19, 2022, President Joe Biden nominated Brown to be the next ambassador to Ecuador. His nomination was sent to the Senate on September 6, 2022. The nomination was not acted upon for the rest of the year and was returned to President Biden on January 3, 2023.

President Biden renominated Brown the same day. Hearings on his nomination were held before the Senate Foreign Relations Committee on May 4, 2023. The committee favorably reported his nomination on June 1, 2023. On May 2, 2024, his nomination was confirmed by the United States Senate via voice vote. He arrived in Quito on June 18, 2024.

He presented his credentials to President Daniel Noboa on June 26, 2024.

== Awards and recognitions ==
Brown is a recipient of the Franklin H. Williams award for Outstanding Community Leaders. Brown has also won numerous USAID performance awards along with the USAID Administrator's Management Improvement Award.

== Personal life ==
Brown is a resident of Pennsylvania. He speaks French and Spanish.

Diplomatic posts
Preceded by Michael J. Fitzpatrick	United States Ambassador to Ecuador; 2024–2025	Vacant
