= H. Allen Holmes =

American diplomat (born 1933)

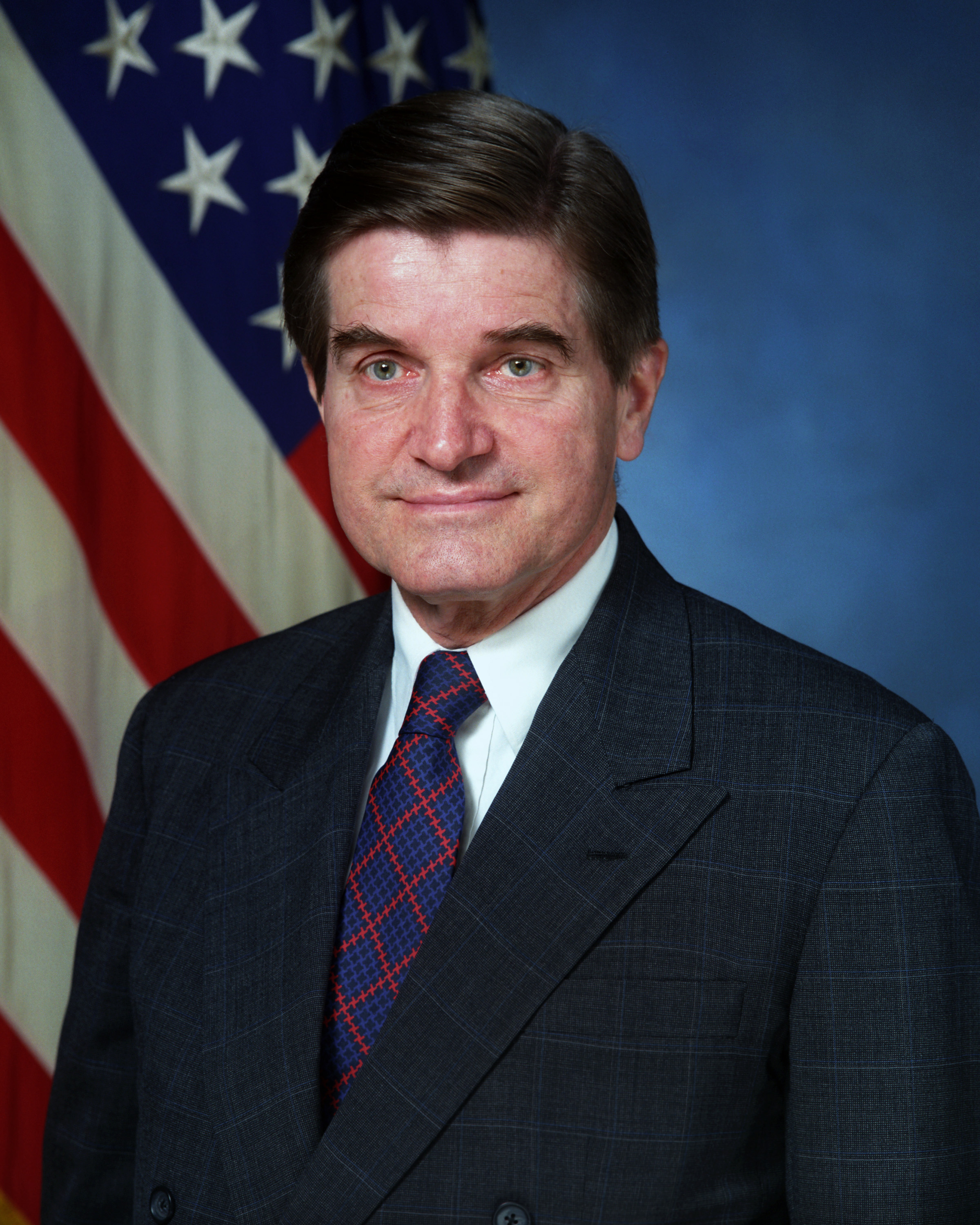
- Holmes in December 1993

9th Assistant Secretary of State for Political-Military Affairs
- In office July 19, 1985 – August 8, 1989
- President: Ronald Reagan
- Preceded by: John T. Chain Jr.
- Succeeded by: Richard A. Clarke

United States Ambassador to Portugal
- In office October 15, 1982 – June 26, 1985
- President: Ronald Reagan
- Preceded by: Richard J. Bloomfield
- Succeeded by: Frank J. Shakespeare

Personal details
- Born: Henry Allen Holmes; January 31, 1933 (age 93) Bucharest, Romania
- Children: 2
- Education: St. Paul's School; Princeton University (AB); Sciences Po
- Profession: Diplomat

Military service
- Allegiance: United States
- Branch/service: United States Marine Corps

Henry Allen Holmes (born January 31, 1933) was the United States Ambassador to Portugal from 1982 to 1985 and a career diplomat.

== Biography ==
Born in Bucharest, Romania to American parents, Holmes received his high school education at St. Paul's School in Concord, New Hampshire, graduating in June 1950.

He earned his A.B. in 1954 at Princeton University, where he was a classmate of Donald Rumsfeld and participated in the NROTC program.

Holmes then joined the US Marine Corps, leaving as an infantry captain in 1957 to study at Sciences Po in Paris. He graduated with a certificate in 1958 and was hired as an intelligence research analyst for the US Department of State that same year. Holmes began his diplomatic career by joining the Foreign Service in 1959; his first posting was as a consular and political officer in Yaoundé, Cameroon. He continued to advance through various State Department positions for the next two decades, including posts in Rome and Paris, until his appointment as Ambassador to Portugal in 1982. From 1985 to 1989, he served as US Assistant Secretary of State for Politico-Military Affairs.

In 1989, he was appointed Ambassador at Large for Burdensharing in which he ensured balanced security responsibility among NATO members, Japan, and other US allies. Following this he was nominated by President Clinton to be Assistant Secretary of Defense for Special Operations and Low-Intensity Conflict. During this time his office generated a plan for the Department of Defense to launch new national counterterrorism strategy to respond to "the gauntlet the international terrorists have thrown at our feet." But as mentioned in the 9/11 Commission Report, the paper never went beyond the Office of the Principal Deputy Under Secretary of Defense for Policy.

He is currently an adjunct professor at Georgetown University's School of Foreign Service and a member of Diplomats and Military Commanders for Change.

== Family ==
H. Allen Holmes is married and has two children.

== See also ==
Government offices
Preceded by John T. Chain Jr.	Assistant Secretary of State for Political-Military Affairs; July 19, 1985 – August 8, 1989	Succeeded by Richard A. Clarke
Preceded by Richard J. Bloomfield	United States Ambassador to Portugal; 1982–1985	Succeeded by Frank Shakespeare
