= List of ambassadors of the United States to Ecuador =

Ambassador of the United States to Ecuador
- Seal of the United States Department of State

- Flag of a United States ambassador

- Incumbent; Lawrence Petroni; Chargé d'affaires since April 17, 2025
- Nominator: The president of the United States
- Appointer: The president; with Senate advice and consent
- Inaugural holder: Van Brugh Livingston as Chargé d'Affaires
- Formation: August 12, 1848
- Website: U.S. Embassy - Quito

The following is a list of ambassadors of the United States, or other chiefs of mission, to Ecuador. The title given by the United States State Department to this position is currently Ambassador Extraordinary and Minister Plenipotentiary.

== Ambassadors and chiefs of mission ==
Representative	Title	Presentation of credentials	Termination of mission	Appointed by
Robert B. McAfee	Chargé d'affaires to the governments of New Granada and Ecuador with residence en Bogotá	1835	1836	Andrew Jackson
James Chamberlayne Pickett	Plenipotentiary for signing a Treaty of Peace and Commerce	1838	1839	Martin Van Buren
Van Brugh Livingston	Chargé d'affaires	August 12, 1848	November 12, 1849	James K. Polk
John Trumbull Van Alen	Chargé d'affaires	November 19, 1849	July 18, 1850	Zachary Taylor
Courtland Cushing	Chargé d'affaires	June 3, 1851	October 12, 1853	Millard Fillmore
Philo White	Minister Resident	September 2, 1854	September 14, 1858	Franklin Pierce
Charles R. Buckalew	Minister Resident	September 20, 1858	July 10, 1861	James Buchanan
Friedrich Hassaurek	Minister Resident	July 15, 1861	January 13, 1866	Abraham Lincoln
William T. Coggeshall	Minister Resident	September 20, 1866	August 3, 1867	Andrew Johnson
David Alexander Nunn	Minister Resident	Unknown	November 2, 1869	Ulysses S. Grant
E. Rumsey Wing	Minister Resident	June 23, 1870	October 5, 1874	Ulysses S. Grant
Christian Wullweber	Minister Resident	December 20, 1875	September 25, 1876	Ulysses S. Grant
Rowland B. Mahany	Envoy Extraordinary and Minister Plenipotentiary	May 22, 1892	June 23, 1893	Benjamin Harrison
Edward Henry Strobel	Envoy Extraordinary and Minister Plenipotentiary	July 15, 1894	December 31, 1894	Grover Cleveland
James D. Tillman	Envoy Extraordinary and Minister Plenipotentiary	June 3, 1895	December 15, 1897	Grover Cleveland
Archibald J. Sampson	Envoy Extraordinary and Minister Plenipotentiary	December 16, 1897	July 15, 1905	William McKinley
Joseph W. J. Lee	Envoy Extraordinary and Minister Plenipotentiary	December 30, 1905	February 21, 1907	Theodore Roosevelt
Williams C. Fox	Envoy Extraordinary and Minister Plenipotentiary	April 18, 1907	July 19, 1911	Theodore Roosevelt
Evan E. Young	Envoy Extraordinary and Minister Plenipotentiary	August 8, 1911	January 29, 1912	William Howard Taft
Montgomery Schuyler, Jr.	Envoy Extraordinary and Minister Plenipotentiary	May 24, 1913	September 29, 1913	Woodrow Wilson
Charles S. Hartman	Envoy Extraordinary and Minister Plenipotentiary	September 30, 1913	March 20, 1922	Woodrow Wilson
Gerhard Adolph Bading	Envoy Extraordinary and Minister Plenipotentiary	May 15, 1922	November 1, 1929	Warren G. Harding
William Dawson	Envoy Extraordinary and Minister Plenipotentiary	August 9, 1930	February 27, 1935	Herbert Hoover
Antonio C. Gonzalez	Envoy Extraordinary and Minister Plenipotentiary	March 7, 1935	March 30, 1938	Franklin D. Roosevelt
Boaz Walton Long	Envoy Extraordinary and Minister Plenipotentiary	April 29, 1938	April 14, 1942	Franklin D. Roosevelt
Boaz Walton Long	Ambassador Extraordinary and Plenipotentiary	April 14, 1942	May 1, 1943	Franklin D. Roosevelt
Robert M. Scotten	Ambassador Extraordinary and Plenipotentiary	May 27, 1943	April 17, 1947	Franklin D. Roosevelt
John F. Simmons	Ambassador Extraordinary and Plenipotentiary	July 16, 1947	July 12, 1950	Harry S. Truman
Paul C. Daniels	Ambassador Extraordinary and Plenipotentiary	May 25, 1951	July 9, 1953	Harry S. Truman
Sheldon T. Mills	Ambassador Extraordinary and Plenipotentiary	August 19, 1954	April 6, 1956	Dwight D. Eisenhower
Christian M. Ravndal	Ambassador Extraordinary and Plenipotentiary	August 29, 1956	August 1, 1960	Dwight D. Eisenhower
Maurice M. Bernbaum	Ambassador Extraordinary and Plenipotentiary	November 16, 1960	January 14, 1965	Dwight D. Eisenhower
Wymberley DeRenne Coerr	Ambassador Extraordinary and Plenipotentiary	March 24, 1965	October 7, 1967	Lyndon B. Johnson
Edson O. Sessions	Ambassador Extraordinary and Plenipotentiary	September 26, 1968	February 15, 1970	Lyndon B. Johnson
Findley Burns, Jr.	Ambassador Extraordinary and Plenipotentiary	April 9, 1970	May 18, 1973	Richard Nixon
Robert C. Brewster	Ambassador Extraordinary and Plenipotentiary	October 1, 1973	April 8, 1976	Richard Nixon
Richard J. Bloomfield	Ambassador Extraordinary and Plenipotentiary	May 31, 1976	January 21, 1978	Gerald Ford
Raymond E. Gonzalez	Ambassador Extraordinary and Plenipotentiary	July 31, 1978	January 28, 1982	Jimmy Carter
Samuel Friedlander Hart	Ambassador Extraordinary and Plenipotentiary	December 22, 1982	April 5, 1985	Ronald Reagan
Fernando Enrique Rondon	Ambassador Extraordinary and Plenipotentiary	August 8, 1985	July 26, 1988	Ronald Reagan
Richard Newton Holwill	Ambassador Extraordinary and Plenipotentiary	July 27, 1988	November 25, 1989	Ronald Reagan
Paul C. Lambert	Ambassador Extraordinary and Plenipotentiary	July 2, 1990	February 1, 1992	George H. W. Bush
James F. Mack	Chargé d'affaires ad interim	February 1, 1992	November 16, 1993	George H. W. Bush
Peter F. Romero	Ambassador Extraordinary and Plenipotentiary	November 16, 1993	July 25, 1996	Bill Clinton
Leslie M. Alexander	Ambassador Extraordinary and Plenipotentiary	August 5, 1996	June 11, 1999	Bill Clinton
Gwen C. Clare	Ambassador Extraordinary and Plenipotentiary	August 24, 1999	July 3, 2001	Bill Clinton
Kristie A. Kenney	Ambassador Extraordinary and Plenipotentiary	September 25, 2002	July 6, 2005	George W. Bush
Linda Jewell (Note: She was treasurer of the Public Diplomacy Council and for the State Department, served as Deputy Assistant Secretary for Mexico and Canada and as the American Ambassador to Ecuador. Her other public service positions included Director of the Office of Policy Planning and Coordination in the Bureau of Western Hemisphere Affairs, the Deputy Chief of Mission at the U.S. Embassy in San Jose, Costa Rica and as Director of the Office of Western Hemisphere Affairs of United States Information Agency. From 2010 until 2011, she was a Senior Fellow at Yale University’s Jackson Institute for Global Affairs. Jewell was born in Little Rock, Arkansas, attended Hall High School and was a member of the third four-year class of women at Yale College (Literature Major, Class of 1975). She received a master's degree in International Public Policy from Johns Hopkins School of Advanced International Studies in 1988.)	Ambassador Extraordinary and Plenipotentiary	August 29, 2005	July 22, 2008	George W. Bush
Heather M. Hodges	Ambassador Extraordinary and Plenipotentiary	October 2, 2008	April 5, 2011	George W. Bush
Andrew Bowen	Chargé d’Affaires a.i.	April 15, 2011	July 2011	Barack Obama
Timothy Zúñiga-Brown	Chargé d’Affaires a.i.	July 2011	April 2012	Barack Obama
Adam E. Namm	Ambassador Extraordinary and Plenipotentiary	June 22, 2012	September 28, 2015	Barack Obama
Todd C. Chapman	Ambassador Extraordinary and Plenipotentiary	April 14, 2016	June 8, 2019	Barack Obama
Michael J. Fitzpatrick	Ambassador Extraordinary and Plenipotentiary	July 3, 2019	June 15, 2024	Donald Trump
Arthur W. Brown	Ambassador Extraordinary and Plenipotentiary	June 26, 2024	April 17, 2025	Joe Biden
Lawrence Petroni	Chargé d’Affaires a.i.	April 17, 2025	Present	Donald Trump

== See also ==
- Ecuador – United States relations
- Foreign relations of Ecuador
- Ambassadors of the United States
