= Samuel Jaudon =

American businessman (1796–1874)

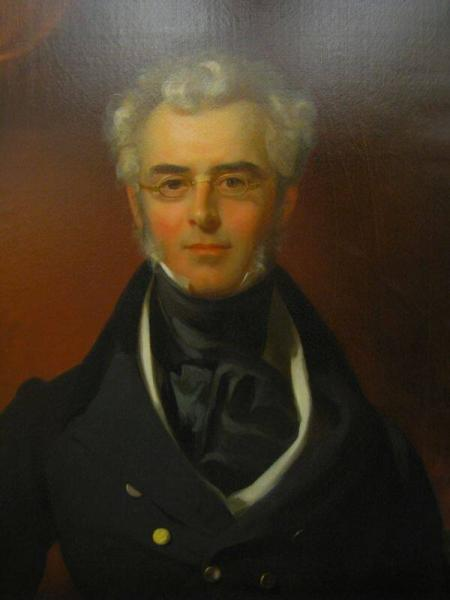
- Born: May 14, 1796; Philadelphia, United States
- Died: May 31, 1874 (aged 78); New York City, United States
- Occupation: Banker
- Spouse: Marguerite Peyton Alricks
- Children: 6

Samuel Jaudon (May 14, 1796 – May 31, 1874) was a 19th-century American banker and businessman who was best known for his work as cashier and agent of the Bank of the United States from 1832 to 1837. During the Panic of 1837, Jaudon secured large loans for the bank and engaged in commodity speculation, particularly cotton, which failed to secure the bank's own credit and caused it to go bankrupt.

== Early life ==
Jaudon was born on May 14, 1796, and was baptized by the Rev. Ashbel Green at Second Presbyterian Church of Philadelphia on July 24, 1796. He was the eldest son of Daniel Jaudon and Anna (née McNeal) Jaudon.

He graduated from Princeton University in 1813.

== Career ==
Jaudon was hired as the cashier of the New Orleans branch for the Bank of the United States, the country's national bank. In 1832, Jaudon became the national cashier during the Bank War between Bank president Nicholas Biddle and U.S. president Andrew Jackson. During these years, the Bank was "plagued with allegations of poor management and fraud" including improper investments made by Jaudon and others, and election fraud in the form of preferential loans to political allies. As a result of the Bank War, the Bank lost its national charter, but it remained in business with a state charter in Pennsylvania. In May 1836, Jaudon secured a loan of £1,000,000 through Barings Bank and a second loan of 12,500,000 F in Paris. He left his position in 1837, but continued working as an agent for loan negotiations.

In 1835, Jaudon sold the Bainbridge estate bonds and invested the money in the Delaware and Raritan Canal Company. Mary T. Bainbridge, Jaudon's sister-in-law who was a daughter of Commodore William Bainbridge (who had bequeathed Pennsylvania state bonds to his daughters upon his death in 1833).

=== Railroad speculation ===
In 1837-1838, Jaudon served as a director of the Wilmington and Susquehanna Railroad, one of the four companies that created the first rail link from Philadelphia to Baltimore. (The main line survives today as part of Amtrak's Northeast Corridor.) When the W&S merged into the Philadelphia, Wilmington, and Baltimore Railroad, Jaudon stayed on as a director. His service as a railroad executive is noted on the 1839 Newkirk Viaduct Monument in Philadelphia.

Jaudon resigned from the railroad's board in January 1838, and traveled to London to try to sell various U.S. securities on behalf of the now-private Bank of the United States. Among his endeavors, he sought in March to secure a $400,000 loan for the PW&B-connected Harrisburg, Portsmouth, Mountjoy and Lancaster Railroad. In May, he told railroad officials that the bond market was glutted, but they pressed him to lower his price.

In August, PW&B officials authorized him and William Strickland to negotiate a loan for their railroad. He ultimately succeeded in 1840 in obtaining a loan of $113,000 by using United States Bank bonds as collateral.

Continuing his work for the Bank of the United States, Jaudon was noted as a skilled "financial diplomat" who managed to keep European capital flowing to the Bank amid the Panic of 1837, made efforts to abet U.S. cotton speculation and dubious bond sales, but could not ultimately keep the Bank afloat. It suspended payments in late 1839, and closed in 1841.

On December 10, 1841, Jaudon, along with Biddle and John Andrews, were indicted by a grand jury on charges of defrauding the Bank's stockholders of $400,000 in 1836 and trying to cover it up through fraudulent recordkeeping in 1841. Jaudon was discharged on a writ of habeas corpus, and was not arraigned after.

By 1844, Jaudon and his family lived in New York City.

=== Later life ===
In 1855, Jaudon was secretary of the Texas Pacific Railway Company based in New York, but which sought to build a railroad with land grants from the Mississippi River. President Polk's Secretary of the Treasury Robert J. Walker was President, and Samuel Butler King of Georgia was also involved. The American Civil War interrupted the project, which ultimately succeeded after Jaudon's death as the Texas and Pacific Railway under Jay Gould.

In 1865, Jaudon took out a loan from the National City Bank of New York to finance coal speculation, and gave as collateral 47 shares of his sister-in-law's stock without her knowledge, and later the remaining 70 shares. In December 1867, when the loan came due, he sold Mary's stock to cover his own debt. Mary sued Jaudon, who sued his bank, who countersued in a case that was ultimately decided by the Supreme Court. The Jaudons lost the money.

== Personal life ==
On August 4, 1823, Jaudon married Marguerite Peyton Alricks (1799-1880). Together, they were the parents of six children, including:

- Annie Peyton Jaudon (1824–1894), who married Philip Livingston in 1857.
- Frances Orme Jaudon (1825–1827), who died young.
- Julia Webster Jaudon (1826–1901), who married Jeremiah Van Rensselaer, a direct descendant of Lt. Gov. Jeremiah Van Rensselaer, in 1846.
- Peyton Jaudon (1828–1859), who died young.
- Samuel Peyton Jaudon (1831–1891), who married Oshidzu Matsura, daughter of Hatamoto Yoro Isami Matsura, in 1831.
- Francis Duncan Jaudon (1833–1906), who married Elizabeth McDonald Strong, in 1857.
- Lawson White Jaudon (1836–1852), who died unmarried.
- Ada Mary Caroline Jaudon (1839–1904), who married Van Brugh Livingston, son of Van Brugh Livingston, in 1874.

Jaudon died in Philadelphia on May 31, 1874, survived by his widow and three children. He was interred at Mount Vernon Cemetery in Philadelphia. She died on April 13, 1880 and was buried in the Jaudon vault with her husband.

=== Descendants ===
Through his daughter Julia, he was a grandfather of socialites Augustus Cortlandt Van Rensselaer and Peyton Jaudon Van Rensselaer, whose portrait was painted by John Singer Sargent in 1921.
