= Christian Wullweber =

American diplomat (1833–1877)

Christian Friedrich Wilhelm Jurgen Wullweber (July 1, 1833, in Hagenow, Germany – September 22, 1877, in Dubuque, Iowa) was the American Resident Minister to Ecuador from 1875 until 1876. He was also an academic, politician, lawyer and educational leader.

Wullweber was born in the German Confederation. In the 1850s he was an instructor in classics and the German language. He was a teacher at Alexander College, an educational instruction in Dubuque, Iowa, from 1853-1856. In 1856 his mother died and he returned to Germany. He then studied at Heidelberg University. Later he moved to Massachusetts where he was a student at Harvard Law School. In 1859 Wullweber came back to Dubuque and established a law practice.

Wullweber was elected vice president of the Dubuque Board of Education in 1864. In 1872 he was a presidential elector for Iowa. In 1874 he became president of the board of education of Dubuque.
