= Fernando Enrique Rondon =

American diplomat

Fernando Enrique Rondon (May 6, 1936 Los Angeles, California) was the American Ambassador to Ecuador (1985-1988) and served concurrent appointments as Ambassador to Madagascar and Comoros.

== Biography ==
Born to a Mexican mother and Peruvian father, his family moved to Mexico City when he was thirteen. He graduated from the University of California at Berkeley in 1960.

=== Career ===
Rondon was posted in Iran during the White Revolution from 1962–1964. At one point he was approached by a brigadier general in charge of the US Military Group. He was surprised to be in that position. Due to a nighttime curfew, when his wife was going to give birth, she needed to go to the hospital during the day. The baby was born overnight and he was unable to be there due to the curfew.

From 1964 until 1966, he studied French and Maghrebian Arabic. During his field training, he asked to be assigned to Algeria due to the reputation of John D. Jernegan and Lewis Hoffacker. He became Principal Officer in Constantine, Algeria in 1966 and 1967. During the Six-Day War, they were evacuated and finished the tour in Algiers as members of the American Interests Section of the Embassy of Switzerland.

When Rondon was approached about becoming Ambassador to Madagascar, he had some initial trepidation based on the pro Communist leanings of the government and the expulsion of the United States ambassador and five members of his staff in 1971. That was followed by the refusal to accept an Ambassadorial nominee in 1975. But by 1980, internal conditions within Madagascar made it within their best interests to reestablish a better relationship with the US and agreed to Rondon's appointment. Rondon “is credited with restoring a semblance of friendship.“
