= James Chamberlayne Pickett =

American politician

James Chamberlayne Pickett (February 6, 1793, Fauquier County, Virginia – July 10, 1872 Washington, D.C.) was an American civil servant who was superintendent of the American Patent Office beginning on February 1, 1835 (he resigned on April 30, 1835, to become the fourth auditor of the Treasury Department), Secretary of State of Kentucky, lawyer, newspaper editor and diplomat.

Pickett graduated from West Point and went on to serve in the United States Army during the War of 1812. He returned to Kentucky and practiced law as well as editing a newspaper before being elected to the Kentucky legislature. He spent a total of eleven years as a diplomat in South America and was editor of the Congressional Globe. He was Chargé d'Affaires in Peru (Appointed: June 9, 1838; Presentation of Credentials: January 30, 1840; Termination of Mission: Superseded April 28, 1845).
