= Roland R. Harrison =

American journalist (1878–1941)

Roland R. Harrison (1878–1941) was a journalist who served as editor for both The New York Herald and The Christian Science Monitor.

== Biography ==
Harrison was born in Smithville, New York on June 10, 1878. He graduated from Cornell University in 1903 and started a career in journalism working for papers in New York, including the Brooklyn Standard Union, The New York Times, and The New York Herald. Harrison worked for a total of 19 years in New York, serving as city editor for The New York Herald.

In 1922 Harrison joined the staff of The Christian Science Monitor. He became the paper's executive editor in 1924. In 1927 the organizational structure of the Monitor was changed and the position of editor-in-chief, previously occupied by Willis J. Abbot, was expanded to include an Editorial Board of four members. Harrison and Abbot both served on the Board and were joined by Frank L. Perrin and Charles E. Heitman, the latter of whom also served as manager of the Publishing Society. Harrison led the Editorial Board during this time. He retained the title and role of executive editor until 1929 when he replaced Heitman as manager of the Publishing Society. After 1939, the paper returned to an editor-in-chief organizational structure, with Harrison filling the role until 1941 under the title of administrative editor. During his tenure at the Monitor he oversaw the planning and completion of a new publishing house building, and had a significant influence on the development of the paper during his tenure. Harrison also worked closely with Roscoe Drummond, who joined the Monitor's Editorial Board in 1933. Harrison died in 1941 and was replaced by Erwin Canham as chief editor of the paper. Canham said of Harrison that he "was kindness and patience personified", and referring to Harrison's legacy with the Monitor, said that he "exerted great influence on the paper's progress."

Media offices
Preceded by Willis J. Abbot	Editor of The Christian Science Monitor; 1939–1941	Succeeded by Erwin Canham
