= DeWitt John =

American journalist, editor, and author (1915–1985)

DeWitt John (August 1, 1915 - October 22, 1985) was an American journalist, editor, and author. During his tenure as editor of The Christian Science Monitor, the paper won three Pulitzer Prizes.

== Biography ==
DeWitt John was born in Safford, Arizona to Franklin Howard John and Frances DeWitt John; and graduated from Principia College in 1936 before receiving graduate degrees in political science from the University of Chicago in 1937 and in journalism from Columbia University in 1938.

John began his career in journalism as a reporter for the St. Petersburg Times in Florida; and in 1939, was hired on by Roscoe Drummond as a political reporter for The Christian Science Monitor. A few years into his career, John uncovered corruption relating to James Michael Curley's 1941 mayoral campaign, helping lead to Curley's defeat to Maurice J. Tobin, for which Monitor editor Erwin Canham dubbed him the "kingmaker." At the beginning of World War II, John took a leave of absence to join the United States Navy, during which he was awarded the Bronze Star Medal for his service. He developed an interest in international reporting during this time, and upon returning to the Monitor was sent to Europe by Charles Gratke, the Monitor's foreign editor, to cover aftermath of the war.

John succeeded Canham as editor of the Monitor in 1964, and served in that position until 1970. Immediately upon taking over, he had the paper redesigned for readability and gave across-the-board raises to the entire Monitor staff, as well as having reporters give more of their time to focus on investigative reporting. During his tenure as Monitor editor, the paper won three Pulitzer Prizes: for a series about the Indonesian people's overthrow of President Sukarno (1967), on a crisis in the American judicial system (1968), and on saving the national parks system in America (1969).

John also served as editor of The Christian Science Journal, Christian Science Sentinel and The Herald of Christian Science for three years, manager of the committee on publication, and was a member of the church's Board of Directors from 1970 to 1980, as well as holding various other positions in the church including practitioner and teacher.

He died October 22, 1985. Katherine W. Fanning, who also served as editor of the Monitor, said of him that "[a]ny editor of this newspaper carries a special responsibility to its mission - to benefit mankind," and that "DeWitt John was an outstanding example of these special qualities for subsequent editors." Robert C. Nelson, the paper's national news editor under John, wrote: "His was a generous spirit that inspired a great many lives."

== Selected published works ==
- The Christian Science Way of Life Englewood Cliffs, NJ: Prentice Hall, 1962 (published with A Christian Scientist's Life by Erwin Canham)

Media offices
Preceded by Erwin Canham	Editor of The Christian Science Monitor; 1964-1970	Succeeded by John Hughes
