= Hodding =

Hodding is a given name. Notable people with the name include:

- Hodding Carter (1907–1972), American progressive journalist and author
- Hodding Carter III (1935–2023), American journalist and politician
