= William Dyess =

William Dyess may refer to:

- William E. Dyess (1916–1943), United States Army Air Forces officer
- William J. Dyess (1929–1996), American diplomat
