= Erwin Canham =

American journalist and author

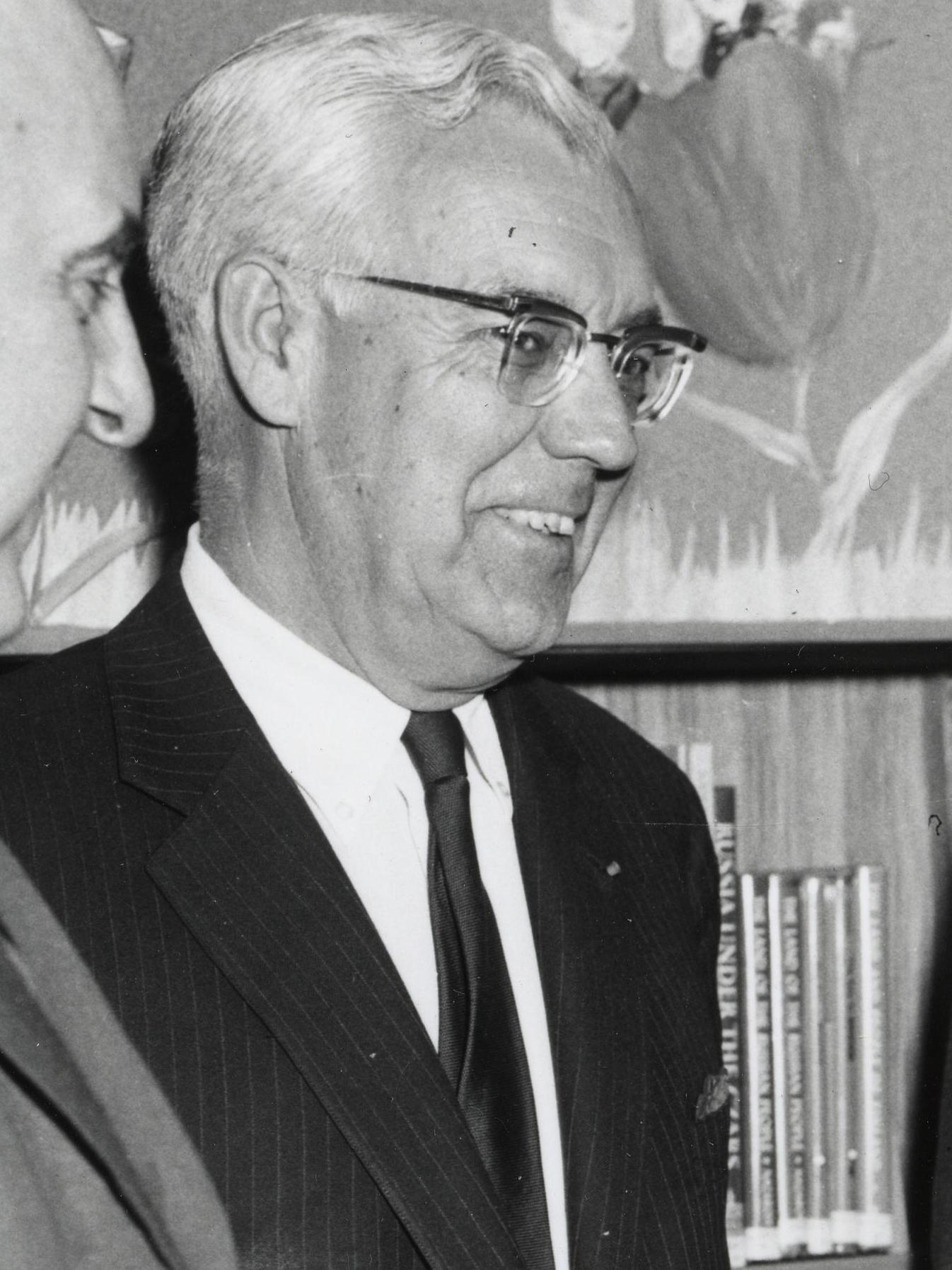

Resident Commissioner of the Northern Mariana Islands
- In office July 19, 1975 – January 9, 1978
- Preceded by: Position established
- Succeeded by: Carlos Camacho (as Governor)

Personal details
- Born: Erwin Dain Canham; February 13, 1904 Auburn, Maine, U.S.
- Died: January 3, 1982 (aged 77) Agana, Guam, U.S.
- Party: Republican
- Spouses: Thelma Whitman (m. 1924; died 1967) Sue Daltry (m. 1968)
- Children: 2
- Education: Bates College (BA); Oriel College, Oxford (MPhil)

Erwin Dain Canham (February 13, 1904 – January 3, 1982) was an American journalist and author. He was best known for his work as the longest-serving editor of The Christian Science Monitor. He also was the first, and last, Resident Commissioner of the Northern Mariana Islands as it was in the process of becoming a commonwealth of the United States; and he was very active in various civic, political, and journalistic activities.

== Early life ==
Canham grew up in Maine, where, when he was as young as 8 years old, he began helping his father run a small newspaper in Sanford. He attended high-school in Auburn, Maine. In 1925 Canham graduated from Bates College, where was captain of the debating team and was a member of Phi Beta Kappa, and he joined the Christian Science Monitor the same year.

== Career ==
Soon after starting work at the Monitor, Canham took leave to earn his bachelor's and master's degrees at Oriel College, Oxford University on a Rhodes scholarship, covering the League of Nations in Geneva, Switzerland for the Monitor on breaks, where he made a significant impression and built a long list of contacts. After having studied history at Oxford in 1928, Canham was put in charge of the Monitor's Geneva bureau. He wrote about international affairs in the company of other Monitor correspondents such as Roscoe Drummond, William Henry Chamberlin and Reuben H. Markham. He stayed there until 1932 when he returned to the United States to head up the Washington, D.C. bureau.

In 1939, Canham returned to Boston as a general news editor. Roscoe Drummond, a close friend of Canham's who replaced him as head of the Monitor's Washington bureau, gave Canham the nickname "Spike" because it was "the most incongruous one" he could think of for Canham's personality, since he was "such a scholarly type." In Boston, Canham worked under editor Roland R. Harrison until taking over as chief editor in 1941, although under the title managing editor until 1944. In this position he had significant influence on how the Monitor covered World War II. Canham became the Monitor's longest-serving editor, assuming the title editor-in-chief in 1964, and in 1974, retiring and being named editor emeritus. During that time he reported on many major world events, including the founding of NATO and the United Nations, where he acted as a delegate to the United Nations General Assembly.

Besides his work at the Monitor, Canham was involved in other civic and professional activities and organizations. He served as president and board chairman of the U.S. Chamber of Commerce, president of the American Society of Newspaper Editors, and president of the board of trustees of the Boston Public Library. He also served on the Bates College board of trustees, was a member of President Richard Nixon's Commission on Campus Unrest, and served as chair of the National Manpower Commission under the Eisenhower administration, and on an advisory commission to the U.S. Information Agency.

In 1953, Canham was sent to Holland to give Queen Juliana of the Netherlands a $27,000 donation from The First Church of Christ, Scientist to help those effected by the North Sea flood of 1953. In 1955, Canham helped mediate a cell block takeover at the Charlestown Prison. He was asked, along with six other men whom the prisoners respected, to listen to their story and see their living conditions. In the end, the hostages which the prisoners had taken were released. Canham later called the experience one of the most meaningful in his life.

In 1958, he published the book Commitment to Freedom: The Story of The Christian Science Monitor which covered the paper's first 50 years as it dealt with world events such as the Great Depression, World War I and II, and more. Linda K. Fuller called the book "groundbreaking" and "the most comprehensive, authoritative account" of the paper's history up to that point.

== Resident Commissioner ==
In 1975, Canham was appointed by Gerald Ford as Resident Commissioner of the Northern Marianas Islands with executive authority from 1975 to 1978 to oversee the result of the status referendum in which residents voted to withdraw from the Trust Territory of the Pacific Islands. Afterwards, Canham kept his home in Saipan, often traveling between there and Massachusetts, and remained active in journalism and other activities.

He underwent abdominal surgery at Guam Memorial Hospital two weeks before his passing on January 3, 1982. At the time, he had been working on a book describing the history of the Northern Marianas Islands. His remains were interred in Guam.

== Legacy ==
Canham advocated for honesty and ethics in journalism. The Monitor won its first Pulitzer Prizes under Canham's leadership. While he was editor, "the Monitor was considered by most media critics as one of the most respected and influential publications in the country. It was especially lauded for its national and international reporting as well as for its writing style and typographical excellence" according to The Washington Post. The Marianas Variety wrote that "[in] a political atmosphere often charged with acrimony and pettiness, he managed to remain fair, objective and untainted by narrow partisanship." Walter Cronkite told Canham that the Monitor was "representative of the finest in independent, courageous and unbiased American journalism."

In 1971, Canham received the Golden Plate Award of the American Academy of Achievement.

== Published works ==
- South Africa through American eyes. London: Public relations office, 1948
- The Authentic Revolution, etc. London: United States Information Service, 1950
- Awakening: the world at mid-century New York: Longmans, Green & Co, 1951
- New frontiers for freedom. New York: Longmans, Green & Co, 1954
- The Christian Science monitor; to injure no man, but to bless all mankind. 1908-1954. New York: Newcomen Society, American Branch, 1954
- Commitment to freedom: the story of The Christian Science Monitor. Boston: Houghton Mifflin, 1958
- Man's great future. (with Rob Nordell) New York: Longmans, Green & Co, 1959
- A Christian Scientist's Life. (printed with The Christian Science Way of Life by DeWitt John, another Monitor editor) Englewood Cliffs, N.J.: Prentice-Hall, 1962
- The American position in the world. Claremont, CA: Claremont Colleges, 1965
- The ethics of United States foreign relations. Columbia: University of Missouri Press, 1966
- The Spiritual revolution. Boston: Christian Science Publishing Society, 1966
- Campus crisis. Boston: Christian Science Publishing Society, 1971

Media offices
Preceded by Roland R. Harrison	Editor of The Christian Science Monitor; 1941–1964	Succeeded by DeWitt John
Political offices
New office	Resident Commissioner of the Northern Mariana Islands; 1975–1978	Succeeded by Carlos S. Camacho as Governor of the Northern Mariana Islands
