= Spokesperson for the United States Department of State =

U.S. government position

- Seal of the United States Department of State

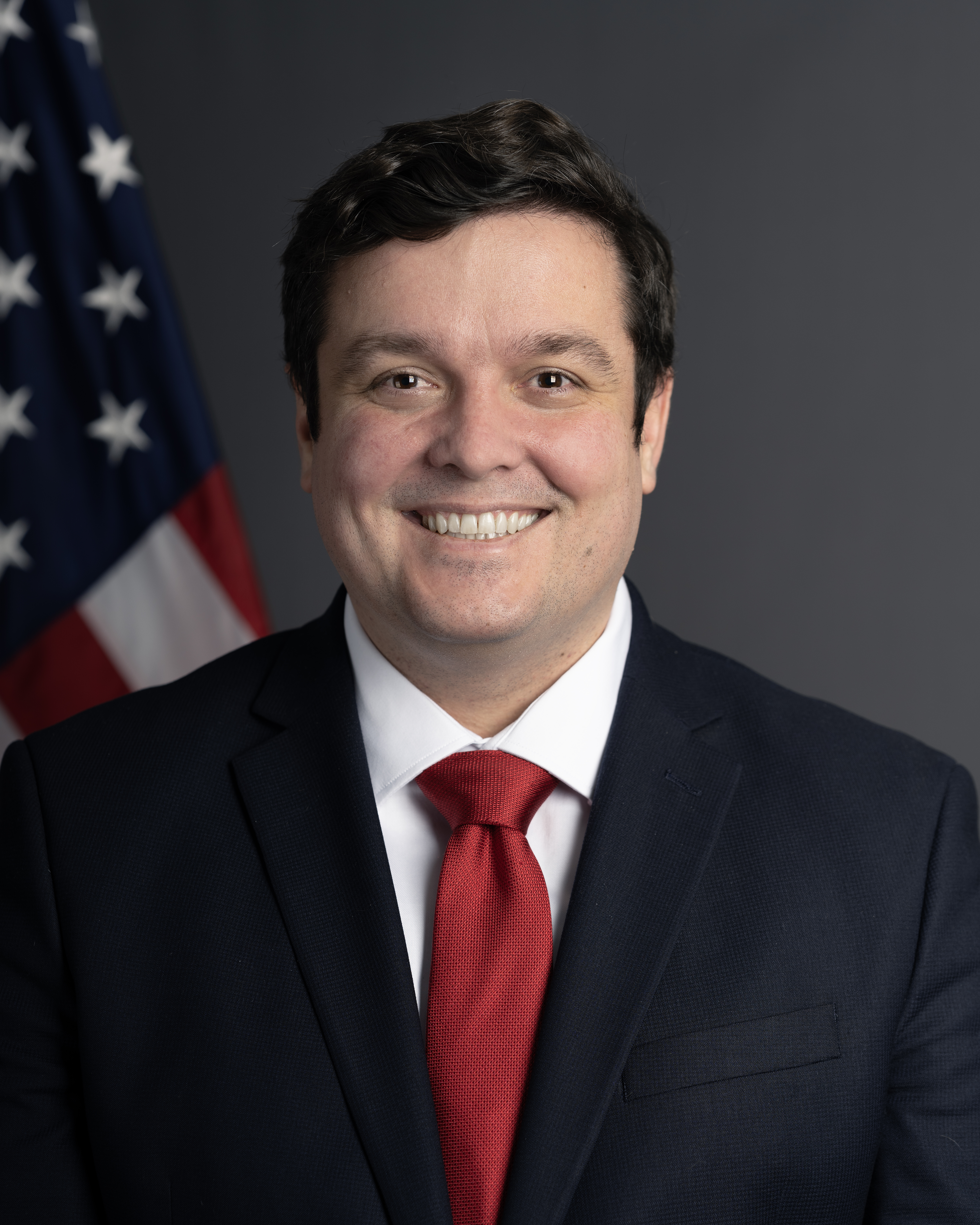
- Incumbent; Tommy Pigott since May 11, 2026
- Appointer: The Secretary of State
- Inaugural holder: Michael J. McDermott
- Website: Official website

The spokesperson for the United States Department of State is a U.S. government official whose primary responsibility is to serve as the spokesperson for the United States Department of State and the U.S. government's foreign policies. The position is located in the Bureau of Global Public Affairs.

Historically, the State Department spokesperson also served as the assistant secretary of state for public affairs. However, this has not been the case since Philip J. Crowley's tenure ended in 2011. Since that time, the assistant secretary and the spokesperson have been two separate positions. (In late 2015, the two roles were briefly merged once againwith the appointment of spokesperson John Kirby as assistant secretary for public affairs.)

== Responsibilities ==
The State Department spokesperson is responsible for communicating the foreign policy of the United States to American and foreign media, typically in a daily press briefing. The daily press briefing typically includes a summary of the secretary of state's schedule, any upcoming trips by the secretary, the president of the United States, or other distinguished State Department officials including under secretaries and assistant secretaries, and official reactions and positions of the U.S. government on news of the day, followed by Q&A with journalists attending the briefing. A tradition that began during the tenure of John Foster Dulles as secretary of state in the 1950s, the daily press briefing is on-the-record, and is recorded and made available on the State Department's website.

The State Department spokesperson will also often accompany the secretary of state on travel to assist with press conferences.

== List of spokespeople ==
#	Spokesperson	Tenure	President	Secretary of State
1	Michael J. McDermott	1927–1945	Calvin Coolidge, Herbert Hoover, Franklin D. Roosevelt, Harry S. Truman	Frank B. Kellogg, Henry L. Stimson, Cordell Hull, Edward Stettinius, Jr.
2	Roger Tubby	1945–1948	Harry S. Truman	James F. Byrnes, George C. Marshall
3	Lincoln White	1955–1963	Dwight D. Eisenhower, John F. Kennedy	John Foster Dulles, Christian Herter, Dean Rusk
4	Robert J. McCloskey	1964–1973	Lyndon B. Johnson, Richard Nixon	Dean Rusk, William P. Rogers
5	Carl E. Bartch	1966–1970	Lyndon B. Johnson, Richard Nixon	Dean Rusk, William P. Rogers
6	Robert Anderson	1974–1976	Gerald Ford	Henry Kissinger
7	Hodding Carter III	1977–1980	Jimmy Carter	Cyrus Vance
8	William J. Dyess	1980–1981	Jimmy Carter	Edmund Muskie
9	Dean E. Fischer	1981–1982	Ronald Reagan	Alexander Haig
10	Robert John Hughes	1982–1985	Ronald Reagan	George P. Shultz
11	Bernard Kalb	1985–1986	Ronald Reagan	George P. Shultz
12	Charles Edgar Redman	1986–1989	Ronald Reagan	George P. Shultz
13	Margaret D. Tutwiler	1989–1992	George H. W. Bush	James Baker
14	Richard Boucher	1992–1993	George H. W. Bush	Lawrence Eagleburger
15	Mike McCurry	1993–1995	Bill Clinton	Warren Christopher
16	R. Nicholas Burns	1995–1997	Bill Clinton	Warren Christopher
17	James Rubin	1997–2000	Bill Clinton	Madeleine Albright
18	Richard Boucher	2001–2005	George W. Bush	Colin Powell
19	Sean McCormack	2005–2009	George W. Bush	Condoleezza Rice
20	Ian C. Kelly	2009–2010	Barack Obama	Hillary Clinton
21	Philip J. Crowley	2010–2011	Barack Obama	Hillary Clinton
22	Victoria Nuland	2011–2013	Barack Obama	Hillary Clinton
23	Jen Psaki	2013–2015	Barack Obama	John Kerry
24	Marie Harf	2015	Barack Obama	John Kerry
25	John Kirby	2015–2017	Barack Obama	John Kerry
26	Mark Toner	2017	Donald Trump	Rex Tillerson
27	Heather Nauert	2017–2019	Donald Trump	Rex Tillerson, Mike Pompeo
28	Morgan Ortagus	2019–2021	Donald Trump	Mike Pompeo
29	Ned Price	2021–2023	Joe Biden	Antony Blinken
30	Matthew Miller	2023–2025	Joe Biden	Antony Blinken
31	Tammy Bruce	2025	Donald Trump	Marco Rubio
32	Tommy Pigott	2026–	Donald Trump	Marco Rubio
