= John Hughes (editor) =

British-born American journalist (1930–2022)

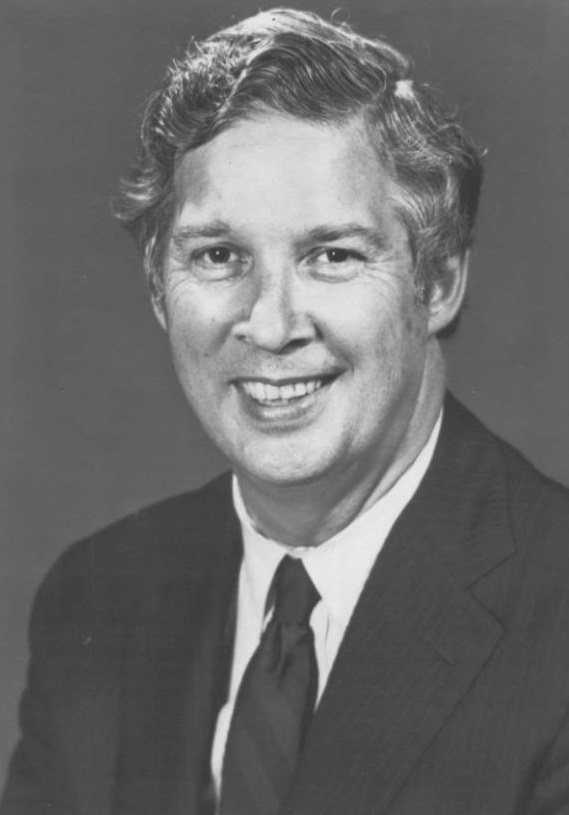
- Hughes in 1985

18th Assistant Secretary of State for Public Affairs
- In office August 20, 1982 – January 1, 1985
- Preceded by: Dean E. Fischer
- Succeeded by: Bernard Kalb

10th Spokesperson for the United States Department of State
- In office 1982–1985
- Preceded by: Dean E. Fischer
- Succeeded by: Bernard Kalb

Personal details
- Born: Robert John Hughes; 28 April 1930 Neath, Wales
- Died: 14 December 2022 (aged 92) Provo, Utah, US
- Occupation: Journalist, editor, author

Robert John Hughes (28 April 1930 – 14 December 2022) was a British-born American journalist, a Nieman Fellow at Harvard University, and winner of the Pulitzer Prize for his coverage of Indonesia and the Overseas Press Club Award for an investigation into the international narcotics traffic. He served as editor of The Christian Science Monitor and The Deseret News and was a former president of the American Society of Newspaper Editors. Hughes authored two books and wrote a nationally syndicated column for The Christian Science Monitor.

== Early life and education ==
Hughes was born on 28 April 1930 in Neath, Wales, the only child of Evan and Dellis May Hughes. He was raised in London and attended the Ancient Literary Company Trade School. During World War II, both of Hughes' parents contributed to the war effort. His father was drafted into the British Army and served in North Africa for three years. His mother was conscripted into the Government Post Office during that time as well. Following the war, the entire family moved to South Africa.

== Career ==
At the age of 16, Hughes started his first job as a reporter at Natal Mercury. Alex Hammond, his first editor, sent him to business school to learn shorthand. Hughes then worked as a reporter for three years before returning to London, where he worked on Fleet Street at a news agency. He eventually was hired by the London-based The Daily Mirror. Shortly after accepting that position, The Natal Mercury contacted Hughes and asked him to come back to be the Chief of the State Capital Bureau. He accepted. He later became a stringer and a freelance writer for a number of papers in London and The Christian Science Monitor in Boston.

In 1955, at the age of 25, Hughes moved to United States and began working in Boston for The Christian Science Monitor. About 18 months later he was sent back to South Africa as a correspondent for The Monitor. He filled that position for six years. Hughes was named the Nieman Fellow at Harvard University the following year. He then worked as an assistant foreign editor in Boston. His next assignment from The Monitor sent him to be a foreign correspondent in Asia for six years. It was during this time that he won the Pulitzer Prize for International Reporting in 1967 for his thorough reporting of the attempted Communist coup in Indonesia in 1965 and the violent purge of communists that followed in 1965–66.

His achievements were readily recognized by The Christian Science Monitor, and he was promoted to managing editor, a position which he held for nine years from 1970 to 1979, until he was promoted to editor and manager. During his three-year stint as Editor and Manager, Hughes became interested in owning his own newspaper.

His initial purchase was a weekly paper in Cape Cod, Massachusetts, called the Cape Cod Oracle, based in Orleans. Hughes Newspapers, Inc. eventually included five weekly newspapers. The company purchased the Cape Cod News in Hyannis from Frank Fallaci and founded the Yarmouth Sun and Dennis Bulletin in the towns of Dennis and Yarmouth. Hughes Newspapers also published the Lower Cape Shoppers Guide. Hughes sold the newspapers to the G.W. Prescott Publishing Co. in Quincy, in the mid-1980s. The new organization became known as MPG Cape Newspapers, and was operated by MPG Communications in Plymouth. Later MPG Cape Newspapers became Cape Cod Newspapers.

Shortly before Ronald Reagan was elected president, Hughes received a call from one of Reagan's advisors, asking him what Reagan should say in his acceptance speech, should he be elected. Hughes offered some ideas, which were remembered and used. Shortly after Reagan was elected, Hughes was asked to move to Washington D.C. to serve in Reagan's administration from 1981 to 1985.

Hughes initially served as the Associate Director of the United States Information Agency, and was later appointed the director of the Voice of America. While serving in that capacity, he received a phone call from George Shultz inviting Hughes to be the spokesman for the State Department and Assistant Secretary of State for Public Affairs. Back in Orleans, the joke among editors and reporters in the Cape Cod Oracle newsroom was, "poor John Hughes: he can't hold down a job for more than six months," according to Dwight Shepard, who Hughes tapped to be the editor of his weeklies while he was in Washington. Needless to say, each of these changes were promotions.

Following four years in Washington D.C., Hughes returned to Massachusetts where his newspapers were flourishing. He resumed his control of the companies, but eventually sold them when neither of his children wanted to fill his position.

Hughes was then asked by The Christian Science Monitor to be in charge of a shortwave radio international program. He did this for a few years and then bought a newspaper in Maine with a friend of his who worked at The Washington Post. The partnership was unsuccessful and short-lived, resulting in the paper being resold, which enabled Hughes to accept further administrative appointments.

In 1991, he was asked to chair President George H. W. Bush's bipartisan Task Force on the future of US government international broadcasting. In 1992 he was appointed Chairman of a joint Presidential-Congressional Commission on Broadcasting to the People's Republic of China. In 1993, the Corporation for Public Broadcasting appointed Hughes to its Advisory Commission on Public Broadcasting to the World.

Hughes then accepted an offer from Brigham Young University (BYU) to begin the International Media Study Program. In 1995, Boutros Boutros Ghali, the Secretary General of the United Nations, requested that Hughes meet with him. During the meeting, Ghali asked if Hughes would be willing to do some work for the United Nations during the 50th Anniversary of the United Nations. BYU granted Hughes a year leave of absence, and he became an Assistant Secretary General and Director of Communications at the United Nations.

In 1996, Neal A. Maxwell called Hughes with concerns about the Deseret News, a secular newspaper owned by the Church of Jesus Christ of Latter-day Saints. Maxwell solicited his advice on improving the paper's circulation. When Hughes returned from the United Nations he began work as a consultant for the Deseret News. Following his counsel, the paper switched its distribution to morning rather than afternoon, which improved circulation. Following the success of this change, the board of directors asked Hughes to be the editor of the newspaper. Hughes accepted the position, and became the first non-Mormon editor of the Deseret News. He filled that position for 10 years, until 2007, at which point he returned to BYU as a Professor in the Communications Department.

=== Later years ===
Hughes went to South Africa in 2007 to make a presentation to local media organizations. In 2011 he received the National Council for International Visitors' Citizen Diplomat Media Award. As of 2012 he continued to write a column for the Christian Science Monitor. In 2014, he published an autobiography, Paper Boy to Pulitzer, which he said he wrote for his children and grandchildren, and because “I thought I had a love story in me, and it’s about journalism. The greatest profession in the world.”

== Personal life and death ==
Hughes and his wife Peggy, a BYU alumnus, had a child, Evan. He had two other children, Mark and Wendy, through an earlier marriage to the late Libby Hughes. He had six grandchildren.

Hughes died on 14 December 2022, at the age of 92.

== Selected writings ==
- The New Face of Africa (1961)
- Indonesian Upheaval (1967)
- The End of Sukarno – A Coup that Misfired: A Purge that Ran Wild (2002, Archipelago Press, ISBN 981-4068-65-9)
- Paper Boy to Pulitzer (2014, ISBN 1891331477)

== Citations ==
Government offices
| Preceded by Dean E. Fischer | Assistant Secretary of State for Public Affairs; 20 August 1982 – 1 January 1985 | Succeeded by Bernard Kalb |
Media offices
| Preceded by DeWitt John | Editor of The Christian Science Monitor; 1970-1979 | Succeeded by Earl Foell |
| Preceded by William James Mortimer | Editor of the Deseret News; 1997-2007 | Succeeded by Joseph A. Cannon |
