= Rust Macpherson Deming =

American diplomat (born 1941)

Rust Macpherson Deming (born October 11, 1941) is a professor and retired American diplomat. He was the Deputy Chief of Mission of the United States to Japan from 1993 to 1996 and Ambassador of the United States to Tunisia from 2011 to 2013.

== Early life ==
Deming, a great-great-grandson of Nathaniel Hawthorne, was born in 1941 to father Olcott Deming, the first U.S. ambassador to Uganda, and mother Louis Macpherson on October 11, 1941, in Greenwich, Connecticut.

He graduated from Rollins College in 1964, and earned a master's degree in East Asian Studies from Stanford University in 1981. He is married to Kristen Deming, and has three daughters and seven grandchildren, with his eldest granddaughter currently attending Princeton University.

== Foreign Service career ==
Deming joined the State Department in 1966 as a political officer in the United States Embassy in Tunis, Tunisia. He spent much of his career dealing with Japanese affairs, having served in Japan as Chargé d'Affaires, ad interim, from December 1996 to September 1997 and as Deputy Chief of Mission under Ambassador Walter Mondale from October 1993 to December 1996. From September 1991 to August 1993, he was Director of the Office of Japanese Affairs in Washington, DC. He served as Minister Counselor for Political Affairs at the American Embassy in Tokyo from August 1987 to July 1991. From 1985 to 1986, he was detailed to the National War College in Washington, DC.

== Later life ==
Deming is currently a Senior Fellow at the Munk School of Global Affairs & Public Policy at University of Toronto and adjunct professor at the Johns Hopkins University School of Advanced International Studies. In 2014, he received the Order of the Rising Sun, Gold Rays and Neck Ribbon from the government of Japan. He is chairman emeritus of the Japan America Society of Washington, DC and a member of the Council on Foreign Relations, the American Foreign Service Association, and the Stanford University Alumni Association.

Diplomatic posts
Preceded by Robin Raphel	United States Ambassador to Tunisia; 2000–2003	Succeeded by William J. Hudson
