= Christina B. Rocca =

Former U.S. Assistant Secretary of State

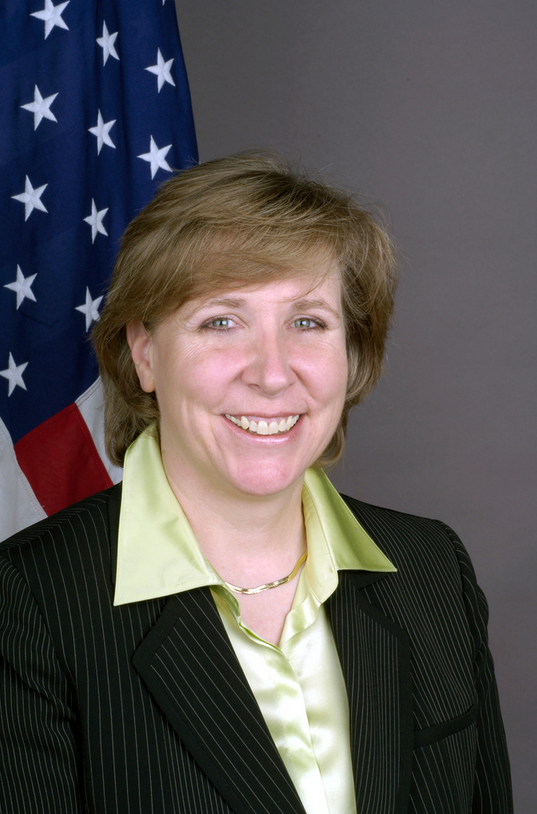

3rd Assistant Secretary of State for South Asian Affairs
- In office June 1, 2001 – February 17, 2006
- President: George W. Bush
- Preceded by: Karl Inderfurth
- Succeeded by: Richard Boucher

Personal details
- Born: 1957 (age 68–69)
- Parent(s): Tennent H. Bagley; Maria Lonyay Bagley
- Education: King's College London (BA)

Christina B. Rocca (born 1957) was United States Assistant Secretary of State for South and Central Asian Affairs from 2001 to 2006.

== Biography ==
A native of Washington, D.C., Christina B. Rocca is the daughter of CIA officer Tennent H. Bagley and his wife, Maria Lonyay Bagley. She was educated at King's College London, receiving a B.A. in History in 1980. She speaks French, Russian, Spanish, and German.

In 1982, Rocca joined the Central Intelligence Agency as a staff operations officer. She worked there until January 1997, at which time she became Foreign Affairs Advisor to Sen. Sam Brownback (R—KS), a member of the United States Senate Committee on Foreign Relations. She held this post until May 2001. While working for Brownback, she specialized on South Asia, as well as Central Asia, the Caucasus, and the Middle East. She authored several pieces of legislation, including the Silk Road Strategy Act of 1999; bills granting permanent normal trade relations status to Kyrgyzstan and Georgia; and three amendments allowing the president to waive certain sanctions imposed on India and Pakistan.

In 2001, President of the United States George W. Bush nominated Rocca as Assistant Secretary of State for South and Central Asian Affairs and, after Senate confirmation, she held this office from June 1, 2001 to February 17, 2006. In the wake of the September 11 attacks, Rocca helped design a new set of US policies towards South Asia. In the immediate post-9/11 period, she oversaw U.S. diplomacy in the period leading up to the invasion of Afghanistan. She also oversaw the U.S.'s diplomatic response to the 2001–2002 India–Pakistan standoff. She was involved in the organized response and humanitarian assistance in the wake of the 2004 Indian Ocean earthquake and the 2005 Kashmir earthquake.

President Bush then named Rocca as the United States Permanent Representative to the Conference on Disarmament in Geneva and Ambassador Rocca held this post from August 2006 until January 2009. There, she represented the U.S. during nuclear disarmament talks and negotiations related to the Biological Weapons Convention and the peaceful use of space.

Upon leaving government service in 2009, Rocca joined the consulting firm Visión Américas.

Government offices
Preceded by Karl Inderfurth	Assistant Secretary of State for South and Central Asian Affairs; June 1, 2001 – February 17, 2006	Succeeded by Richard Boucher
