= Spokesperson =

Speaking representative of an organization

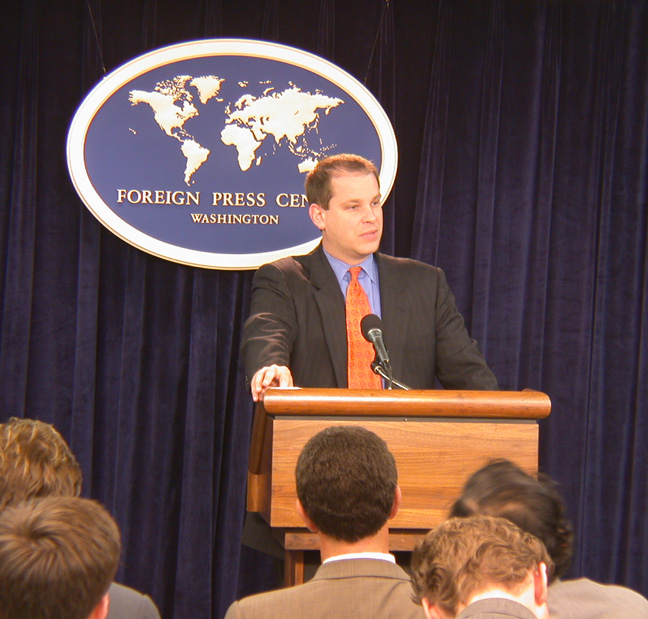
- U.S. National Security Council Spokesman Sean McCormack answering questions at the Washington Foreign Press Center

Occupation
- Names: Spokesperson, spokesman, spokeswoman
- Occupation type: Employment
- Activity sectors: Journalism, communications, politics, public relations

Description
- Competencies: Public speaking, writing
- Related jobs: Public relations

A spokesperson, spokesman, or spokeswoman is someone engaged or elected to speak on behalf of others.

== Duties and function ==
In the present media-sensitive world, many organizations are increasingly likely to employ professionals who have received formal training in journalism, communications, public relations and public affairs in this role in order to ensure that public announcements are made in the most appropriate fashion and through the most appropriate channels to maximize the impact of favorable messages and minimize the unfavorable.

Celebrity spokespeople such as popular athletes (such as Michael Jordan for Nike and Coca-Cola) or entertainers (such as Beyoncé for Pepsi and L'Oreal) are often chosen as spokespeople for commercial advertising.

== Responsibilities ==
Unlike giving a personal testimonial, it is the job of spokespeople to faithfully represent and advocate for the organization's positions, even when these conflict with their own opinion. As a result, spokespeople are generally selected from experienced, long-time employees or other people who are known to support the organization's goals.

== Identity ==
A corporation may be represented in public by its chief executive officer, chairperson or president, chief financial officer, counsel or external legal advisor. In addition, on a day-to-day level and for more routine announcements, the job may be delegated to the corporate communications or investor relations departments (or equivalents), who will act as spokespeople.

As an example, in the particle physics community, large collaborations of physicists elect one (or two) spokespeople or leader(s) of the collaboration. The spokesperson in such cases is the lead scientist of the collaboration, not a public speaker. Each collaboration chooses the roles and responsibilities of the spokesperson for internal purposes, but typically spokespeople also have defined roles for liaising with the host laboratory and/or funding agencies.

In certain governmental organizations (i.e. city, county, school district, state government and police/fire departments), a public information officer is the communications coordinator primarily responsible for providing information to the public through media, pursuant to and limited by any applicable laws.

== See also ==
- Press agent
- Press secretary
- Press service
