= Dean E. Fischer =

American journalist and U.S. Assistant Secretary of State

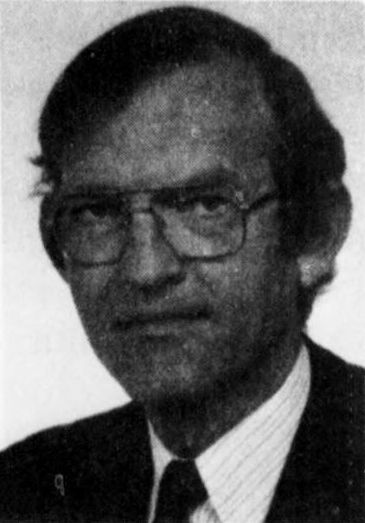

17th Assistant Secretary of State for Public Affairs
- In office August 7, 1981 – August 19, 1982
- Preceded by: William J. Dyess
- Succeeded by: Robert John Hughes

9th Spokesperson for the United States Department of State
- In office 1981–1982
- Preceded by: William J. Dyess
- Succeeded by: Robert John Hughes

Personal details
- Born: October 27, 1936
- Died: July 13, 2000 (aged 63)
- Education: Monmouth College, B.A.; University of Chicago, M.A.
- Occupation: Journalist
- Known for: Time Magazine Correspondent and editor of Time's Washington DC Bureau.

Dean E. Fischer (October 27, 1936 – July 13, 2000) was an American journalist with Time who served as Assistant Secretary of State for Public Affairs from 1981 to 1982.

== Biography ==
Dean E. Fisher was educated at Monmouth College, graduating with a B.A. in 1958. During his time in college, he played college football for the Monmouth Fighting Scots as a halfback. He was inducted into the Fighting Scots Hall of Fame in 1988. After graduating from Monmouth College in 1958, Fischer spent a year studying at the University of Calcutta, and then attended graduate school at the University of Chicago, receiving an M.A. in 1960.

In 1960, Fischer became a reporter for The Des Moines Register. He worked there until 1964 when he became a correspondent for Time magazine. He would go on to hold several positions at Time from 1964 to 1999, including becoming news editor of its Washington, D.C. bureau.

President Ronald Reagan nominated him to be Assistant Secretary of State for Public Affairs. Fischer held this office from August 7, 1981, until August 19, 1982.

After his time at the State Department, Fischer returned to Time.

Survivors include his wife Marina Fischer, two daughters Tara and Tasmin, two step children Lara and Karim.

Government offices
Preceded by William J. Dyess	Assistant Secretary of State for Public Affairs; August 7, 1981 – August 19, 1982	Succeeded by Robert John Hughes
