= Philip J. Crowley =

American government official (born 1951)

- Official portrait, 1999

26th Assistant Secretary of State for Public Affairs
- In office May 26, 2009 – March 13, 2011
- Nominated by: Barack Obama
- Preceded by: Sean McCormack
- Succeeded by: Michael A. Hammer

21st Spokesperson for the United States Department of State
- In office March 11, 2010 – May 31, 2011
- President: Barack Obama
- Preceded by: Ian C. Kelly
- Succeeded by: Victoria Nuland

Personal details
- Born: July 28, 1951 (age 75) Brockton, Massachusetts, U.S.
- Spouse: Col. (Ret.) Paula E. Kougeas
- Children: 2
- Education: College of the Holy Cross (BA)

Military service
- Allegiance: United States
- Branch/service: Air Force
- Years of service: 1973–1999
- Rank: Colonel

Philip J. "P.J." Crowley (born July 28, 1951) is a former United States assistant secretary of state for public affairs. Sworn in on May 26, 2009, he resigned on March 13, 2011, following comments he made about the treatment of Chelsea (formerly Bradley) Manning.

Crowley was named the 2011–2012 recipient of the General Omar N. Bradley Chair in Strategic Leadership, a joint initiative among the United States Army War College, Dickinson College and the Pennsylvania State University – Dickinson School of Law. While in residence, Crowley conducted classes at the three institutions. He is currently teaching at George Washington University and is affiliated with the university's Institute for Public Diplomacy and Global Communication.

== Biography ==
Crowley was born in Brockton, Massachusetts. His mother, Mary Crowley, was a homemaker. His father, William C. Crowley, was a vice president for public relations with the Boston Red Sox, and a former U.S. Army Air Forces B-17 pilot, who spent two years as a POW in a German POW camp.

Crowley was educated at the College of the Holy Cross, graduating with a BA in English in 1973. He joined the United States Air Force in June 1973. He spent 26 years in the Air Force, and was stationed in New Hampshire, New York, Massachusetts, Colorado, Washington, Turkey, and Germany.

During the Gulf War, Crowley was stationed at Incirlik Air Base for four months. In 1997, he was named senior director of public affairs for the United States National Security Council and special assistant to the president for national security affairs. During the Kosovo War, he worked with Javier Solana, secretary general of NATO from April to June 1999. He retired from the Air Force in September 1999 at the rank of Colonel.

In 2001, Crowley became a vice president of the Insurance Information Institute, specializing in the impact of terrorism on insurance in the wake of the September 11 attacks. He then joined the Center for American Progress as a senior fellow in 2003, later becoming the center's director of national defense and homeland security.

== Public service career ==
In 2009, President Barack Obama nominated Crowley to be assistant secretary of state for public affairs. Crowley was sworn into office on May 26, 2009.

He was noted for his dry wit: when reminding Americans on the ban on visiting North Korea, he pointed out on Twitter that "we only have a handful of former presidents" to visit North Korea and retrieve captured Americans. He was forced to apologize to Libyan dictator Muammar Gaddafi after telling an interviewer that Gaddafi's speech to the United Nations did not make "a lot of sense."

=== Chelsea Manning controversy ===
On March 10, 2011, Crowley publicly criticized the Pentagon for the mistreatment of military prisoner Chelsea (then known as Bradley) Manning, the U.S. soldier suspected of providing whistle-blower website WikiLeaks with classified diplomatic cables.

Crowley told an audience of about twenty people at Massachusetts Institute of Technology's Center for Future Civic Media that while Manning was "in the right place," she was being mistreated by the United States Department of Defense. Crowley called the Defense Department's treatment of Manning "ridiculous and counterproductive and stupid." When asked "Are you on the record?" by British journalist Philippa Thomas, Crowley replied "Sure."

His remarks, revealed in Thomas's blog, angered the White House. On March 13, 2011, Crowley resigned from office. In his resignation letter, Crowley stood by his remarks, writing that while the "unauthorized disclosure of classified information is a serious crime under U.S. law," the "exercise of power in today's challenging times and relentless media environment must be prudent and consistent with our laws and values."

Government offices
Preceded by Sean McCormack	Assistant Secretary of State for Public Affairs; May 26, 2009 – March 13, 2011	Succeeded by Michael A. Hammer
