= Bernard Kalb =

American journalist (1922–2023)

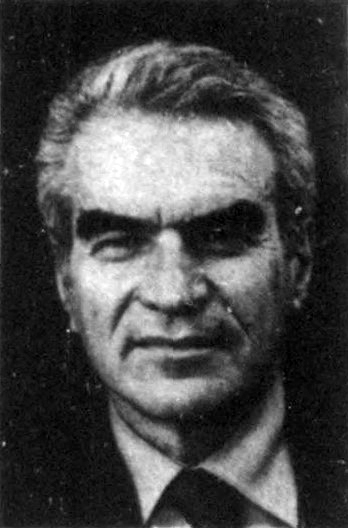
- Kalb, c. 1985

19th Assistant Secretary of State for Public Affairs
- In office August 12, 1985 – October 8, 1986
- Preceded by: Robert John Hughes
- Succeeded by: Charles E. Redman

11th Spokesperson for the United States Department of State
- In office 1985–1986
- Preceded by: Robert John Hughes
- Succeeded by: Charles Edgar Redman

Personal details
- Born: February 4, 1922 New York City, U.S.
- Died: January 8, 2023 (aged 100) North Bethesda, Maryland, U.S.
- Spouse: Phyllis Bernstein
- Children: 4
- Relatives: Marvin Kalb (brother)
- Education: City College of New York; Harvard University
- Occupation: Journalist; moderator; media critic; lecturer; author

Bernard Kalb (February 4, 1922 – January 8, 2023) was an American journalist, moderator, media critic, lecturer, and author.

== Early life and education ==
Kalb was born in New York City on February 4, 1922, the son of Bella (Portnoy) and Max Kalb. His father was a Polish Jewish immigrant and his mother was a Ukrainian Jew. He graduated from the City College of New York with a B.S.S. and later received an M.A. from Harvard University.

== Career ==
Kalb covered international affairs for more than three decades at CBS News, NBC News, and The New York Times. For nearly half of that time he was abroad, based in Indonesia, Hong Kong, Paris, and Saigon.

Near the end of his tenure at the Times, Kalb received a fellowship from the Council on Foreign Relations—awarded annually to a foreign correspondent—and took a leave from the newspaper for a year.

Bernard Kalb and his younger brother, journalist Marvin Kalb, traveled extensively with Henry Kissinger on diplomatic missions and they later wrote a biography titled Kissinger. The brothers also co-authored The Last Ambassador, a novel about the collapse of Saigon in 1975.

In 1984, Kalb was appointed Assistant Secretary of State for Public Affairs and spokesman for the U.S. State Department. It was the first time that a journalist who covered the State Department had been named as its spokesperson.

Kalb quit this post two years later to protest what he called "the reported disinformation program" conducted by the Reagan Administration against the Libyan leader Col. Muammar al-Gaddafi. Kalb said, "you face a choice, as an American, as a spokesman, as a journalist, whether to allow oneself to be absorbed in the ranks of silence, whether to vanish into unopposed acquiescence or to enter a modest dissent. Faith in the word of America is the pulse beat of our democracy".

In his later career, Kalb traveled as a lecturer and moderator. He was the founding anchor and a panelist on the weekly CNN program Reliable Sources from 1993 to 1998.

Kalb made a cameo appearance in the 1993 film Dave.

== Awards and honors ==
Kalb won an Overseas Press Club Award for a 1968 documentary on the Vietcong.

== Personal life and death ==
Kalb and his wife, Phyllis Bernstein, had four daughters. He turned 100 on February 4, 2022.

On January 2, 2023, Kalb suffered a fall and died from his injuries six days later at his home in North Bethesda, Maryland. He was 100.

Government offices
Preceded by John Hughes	Assistant Secretary of State for Public Affairs; August 12, 1985 – October 8, 1986	Succeeded by Charles E. Redman
