= Ann Waldron =

American writer (1924–2010)

- Born: Ann Wood; December 14, 1924; Birmingham, Alabama, U.S.
- Died: July 2, 2010 (aged 85); Princeton, New Jersey, U.S.
- Education: University of Alabama
- Occupation: Author
- Spouse: Martin Waldron
- Children: 4
- Writing career
- Genres: Children's literature; crime fiction

Ann Wood Waldron (December 14, 1924 – July 2, 2010) was an American author who initially focused on writing for children and young adults, then turned to biographies of authors from the South, and ultimately shifted in her late seventies to writing murder mysteries set at Princeton University.

== Early life ==
Ann Wood was born on December 14, 1924, in Birmingham, Alabama, where she attended West End High School. She earned a degree in journalism in 1945 from the University of Alabama and was editor of the college newspaper The Crimson White.

After graduation, she worked for The Atlanta Constitution where she met her future husband Martin Waldron. She would later write for the country life magazine Progressive Farmer, wrote about state government for The Tampa Tribune and was a book editor for the Houston Chronicle.

== Writing career ==
Waldron's earliest writings included six children's novels and nonfiction books for young adults about notable artists. Her first books, published in 1975, were The House on Pendleton Block, the story of a girl who moves to Texas and explores the mysterious house the family lives in, and The Integration of Mary-Larkin Thornhill which is about a girl who is one of two white students in a newly integrated school.

She shifted to biography with her 1987 book Close Connections: Caroline Gordon and the Southern Renaissance, which was published by G. P. Putnam's Sons. Hodding Carter: The Reconstruction of a Racist, which documented the life and transformation of a newspaperman in Greenville, Mississippi, was recognized by The New York Times as a 1993 Notable Book of the Year, which noted how the book "outlines in rich and intriguing detail the price paid by the editor for questioning the tradition of white supremacy".

A later book was a biography of Eudora Welty, who refused to co-operate on the writing of the book. The 1998 book Eudora: A Writer's Life was reviewed by The Atlanta Journal-Constitution, which called Welty "lucky that Ann Waldron is her first biographer" and praised Welson for writing "a judicious account, written against the odds".

At age 78, she turned to writing a series of murder mysteries about a newspaperwoman who investigates crimes at Princeton University.

== Death ==
Waldron died at age 85 on July 2, 2010, at her home in Princeton, New Jersey due to heart failure. Her husband, Pulitzer Prize-winner Martin Waldron, died in 1981, at which time he was the Trenton, New Jersey bureau chief for The New York Times. She was survived by a daughter, three sons, eight grandchildren and a great-granddaughter.
