= Karl Inderfurth =

American diplomat (born 1946)

2nd Assistant Secretary of State for South Asian Affairs
- In office August 4, 1997 – January 19, 2001
- Preceded by: Robin Raphel
- Succeeded by: Christina B. Rocca

Personal details
- Born: September 29, 1946 (age 79) Charlotte, North Carolina, U.S.
- Education: University of North Carolina (BA); University of Strathclyde; Princeton University (MA)

Karl Frederick Inderfurth (born September 29, 1946) is an American diplomat. He was the assistant secretary of state for South Asian affairs from August 1997 to January 2001. In his capacity as assistant secretary, Inderfurth was responsible for US policy regarding Afghanistan, Bangladesh, Bhutan, India, Maldives, Nepal, Pakistan, and Sri Lanka. Prior to his appointment as assistant secretary, Inderfurth served as the U.S. representative for special political affairs to the United Nations, with the rank of ambassador. In this capacity, he dealt with issues such as UN peacekeeping, disarmament, nuclear proliferation and security affairs. Inderfurth also served as deputy U.S. representative on the United Nations Security Council.

== Early life ==
Inderfurth was born in Charlotte, North Carolina in 1946. He attended the University of North Carolina at Chapel Hill, and received his B.A. in political science in 1968. In 1973, he was a Fulbright Scholar at the University of Strathclyde in Scotland where in 2013 he was presented the degree of Doctor of the university honoris causa. He earned his M.A. from the Department of Politics at Princeton University in 1975.

== Career ==
Inderfurth served in several government positions, including on the staffs of the National Security Council, United States Senate Select Committee on Intelligence and United States Senate Committee on Foreign Relations. Inderfurth also worked for ABC News as a national security correspondent, specializing in arms control, and was awarded an Emmy in 1983. Inderfurth worked as the Moscow correspondent for ABC News from February 1989 to August 1991.

During Inderfurth's tenure as Assistant Secretary of State for South Asia, India and Pakistan tested its first nuclear devices in 1998, the Taliban tightened its grip on Afghanistan and extended safe haven to Osama bin Laden, India and Pakistan fought a brief war over the area of Kargil in Kashmir, and there was coup in Pakistan by Gen. Pervez Musharraf removing civilian Prime Minister Nawaz Sharif. During this time, Inderfurth also oversaw Secretary of State Madeleine Albright's Global Humanitarian Demining 2010 Initiative.

In 2002, Inderfurth appeared in the BBC documentary The Situation Room: America in Crisis in which Inderfurth and other high-level, retired diplomats and political appointees portray events in a fictitious White House Situation Room during a hypothetical nuclear crisis. Inderfurth plays the President of the United States, when his National Security Council is faced with a nuclear crisis on the Indian subcontinent. Other notable officials in the documentary include Ambassador Robert B. Oakley, former White House Chief of Staff John Podesta and former White House Press Secretary Joe Lockhart.

Inderfurth co-authored a book with Dr. Loch K. Johnson entitled, Fateful Decisions: Inside the National Security Council (2004) and is a frequent op-ed contributor to major American newspapers.

== Current work ==
Currently, Inderfurth is an adjunct professor at George Washington University's Elliott School of International Affairs. He was a senior advisor and the Wadhwani Chair in U.S.-India Policy Studies at the Center for Strategic and International Studies (CSIS) in Washington, DC. Previously he served as the director of the international affairs graduate program at the Elliott School. His areas of expertise focused on US-South Asian relations and national security decision making at the National Security Council and the Department of State. He also taught an undergraduate course on "Film and US Foreign Policy."

Since joining the George Washington community in 2001, Inderfurth helped organize visits by high-ranking diplomats and heads-of-state such as former United Nations Secretary General Kofi Annan, former United States Secretary of State Madeleine Albright, Afghan President Hamid Karzai and Pakistani former President Pervez Musharraf.

Inderfurth serves as a member of the Council on Foreign Relations, the Fulbright Association and is on the board of trustees of The Asia Foundation.

Inderfurth joined the Board of Directors of the National Democratic Institute in 2014.

Government offices
Preceded by Robin L. Raphel	Assistant Secretary of State for South and Central Asian Affairs; 1997–2001	Succeeded by Christina B. Rocca
