= Assistant Secretary of State for Global Public Affairs =

Main communications officer for US foreign affairs decisionmakers

United States Assistant Secretary of State for Global Public Affairs
- Seal of the United States Department of State

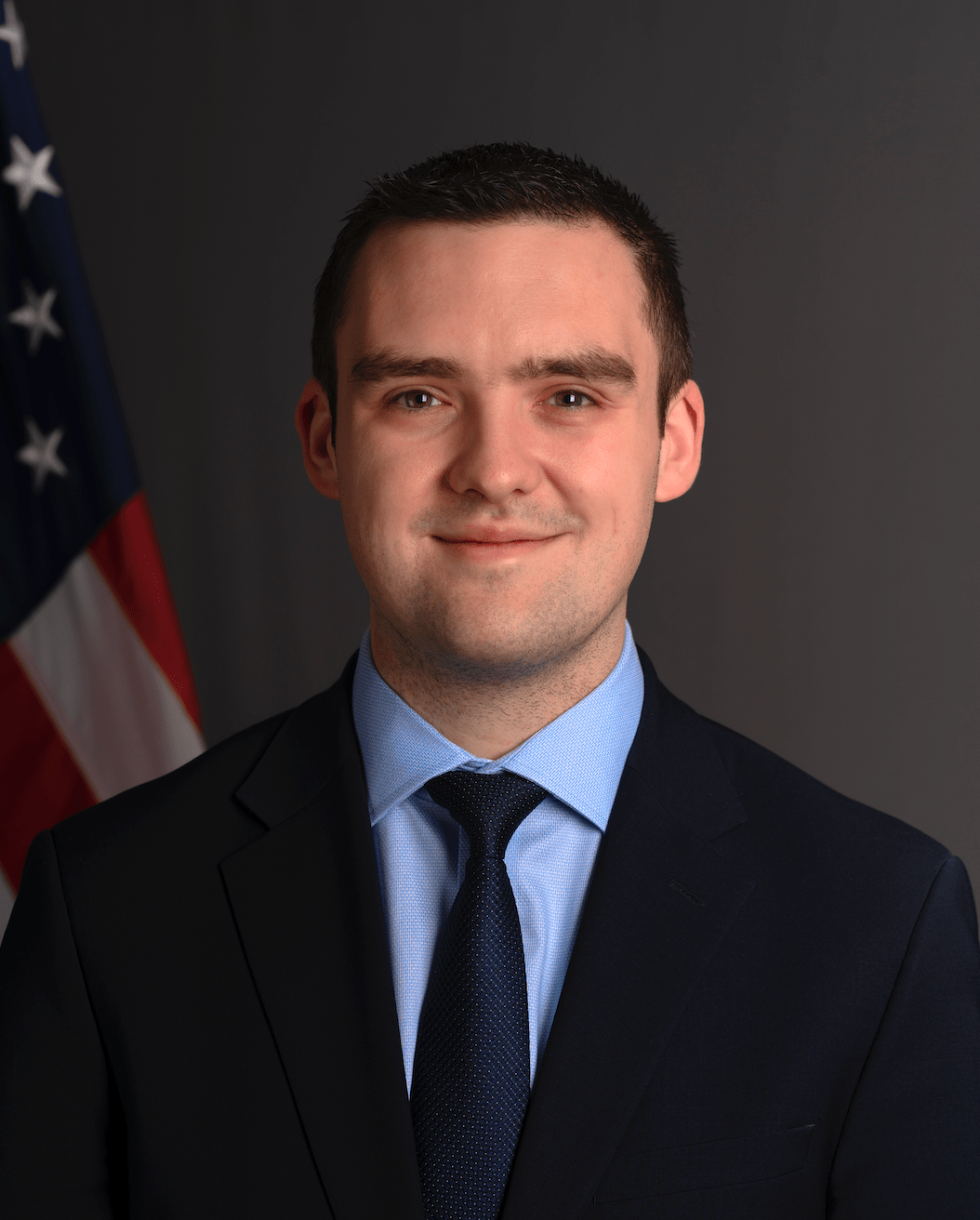
- Incumbent; Dylan Johnson since January 30, 2026
- Reports to: The under secretary for public diplomacy and public affairs
- Appointer: The president of the United States
- Precursor: Assistant Secretary for Public Affairs; and Coordinator for International Information Programs
- Inaugural holder: Michelle Giuda
- Formation: May 28, 2019
- Deputy: Principal Deputy Assistant Secretary of State for Global Public Affairs
- Website: Official website

The assistant secretary of state for global public affairs is the head of the Bureau of Global Public Affairs within the United States Department of State. The assistant secretary of state for global public affairs reports to the secretary of state and the under secretary of state for public diplomacy and public affairs. The position was formed on May 28, 2019 with the merging of the Bureau of International Information Programs and the Bureau of Public Affairs by assistant secretary of state for public affairs Michelle Giuda.

The assistant secretary of state for public affairs was the head of the Bureau of Public Affairs prior to its abolition. The assistant secretary of state for public affairs reported to the secretary of state and the under secretary of state for public diplomacy and public affairs.

== History ==
The position of Assistant Secretary of State for Public Affairs was first created in December 1944 as the Assistant Secretary of State for Public and Cultural Relations. It was later changed to Assistant Secretary of State for Public Affairs in 1946. Initially, incumbents supervised the forerunners of the United States Information Agency and the Voice of America. Under the Presidential Appointment Efficiency and Streamlining Act of 2011, the Assistant Secretary for Public Affairs does not require Senate confirmation.

Historically, the assistant secretary for public affairs had a dual role as the spokesperson for the State Department. From 2011 to 2015, the assistant secretary and the State Department spokesperson were two separate roles held by different people. In late 2015, the two roles were once again merged with the appointment of Spokesperson John Kirby as Assistant Secretary for Public Affairs.

On May 28, 2019, the bureau merged with the Bureau of International Information Programs into the Bureau of Global Public Affairs, and the duties of the assistant secretary of state merged into the duties of the Assistant Secretary of State for Global Public Affairs.

== Officeholders ==
=== Assistant Secretary of State for Public Affairs ===
| # | Image | Name | Assumed office | Left office | President appointed by |
|---|---|---|---|---|---|
| 1 | | Archibald MacLeish | December 20, 1944 | August 17, 1945 | Franklin D. Roosevelt |
| 2 | | William Benton | September 17, 1945 | September 30, 1947 | Harry Truman |
| 3 | | George V. Allen | March 31, 1948 | November 28, 1949 | Harry Truman |
| 4 | | Edward W. Barrett | February 16, 1950 | February 20, 1952 | Harry Truman |
| 5 | | Howland H. Sargeant | February 21, 1952 | January 29, 1953 | Harry Truman |
| 6 | | Carl McCardle | January 30, 1953 | March 1, 1957 | Dwight D. Eisenhower |
| 7 | | Andrew H. Berding | March 28, 1957 | March 9, 1961 | Dwight D. Eisenhower |
| 8 | | Roger Tubby | March 10, 1961 | April 1, 1962 | John F. Kennedy |
| 9 | | Robert Manning | April 11, 1962 | July 31, 1964 | John F. Kennedy |
| 10 | | James L. Greenfield | September 10, 1964 | March 12, 1966 | Lyndon B. Johnson |
| 11 | | Dixon Donnelley | March 22, 1966 | January 31, 1969 | Lyndon B. Johnson |
| 12 | | Michael Collins | January 6, 1970 | April 11, 1971 | Richard Nixon |
| 13 | | Carol Laise | October 10, 1973 | March 27, 1975 | Richard Nixon |
| 14 | | John Reinhardt | April 22, 1975 | March 22, 1977 | Gerald Ford |
| 15 | | Hodding Carter III | March 25, 1977 | June 30, 1980 | Jimmy Carter |
| 16 | | William J. Dyess | August 29, 1980 | July 30, 1981 | Jimmy Carter |
| 17 | | Dean E. Fischer | August 7, 1981 | August 19, 1982 | Ronald Reagan |
| 18 | | Robert John Hughes | August 20, 1982 | January 1, 1985 | Ronald Reagan |
| 19 | | Bernard Kalb | August 12, 1985 | October 8, 1986 | Ronald Reagan |
| 20 | | Charles E. Redman | June 29, 1987 | March 1, 1989 | Ronald Reagan |
| 21 | | Margaret D. Tutwiler | March 3, 1989 | August 23, 1992 | George H. W. Bush |
| 22 | | Thomas E. Donilon | April 1, 1993 | November 7, 1996 | Bill Clinton |
| 23 | | James Rubin | August 7, 1997 | April 2, 2000 | Bill Clinton |
| 24 | | Richard Boucher | January 5, 2001 | June 2, 2005 | Bill Clinton |
| 25 | | Sean McCormack | June 2, 2005 | January 20, 2009 | George W. Bush |
| 26 | | Philip J. Crowley | May 26, 2009 | March 13, 2011 | Barack Obama |
| 27 | | Michael A. Hammer | March 30, 2012 | August 30, 2013 | Barack Obama |
| 28 | | Douglas Frantz | September 3, 2013 | October 1, 2015 | Barack Obama |
| 29 | | John Kirby | December 11, 2015 | January 20, 2017 | Barack Obama |
| - | | Susan Stevenson (Acting) | January 20, 2017 | February 3, 2018 | Donald Trump |
| 30 | | Michelle Giuda | February 3, 2018 | May 28, 2019 | Donald Trump |
| | Office abolished Replaced by Assistant Secretary of State for Global Public Affairs | | | | |

=== Assistant Secretary of State for Global Public Affairs ===
| # | Image | Name | Assumed office | Left office | President appointed by |
|---|---|---|---|---|---|
| 1 | | Michelle Giuda | May 28, 2019 | March 3, 2020 | Donald Trump |
| 2 | | Aaron Ringel | September 14, 2020 | January 20, 2021 | Donald Trump |
| - | | Nicole Chulick (Acting) | January 20, 2021 | June 11, 2021 | Joe Biden |
| - | | Mark Stroh (Acting) | June 14, 2021 | August 20, 2021 | Joe Biden |
| 3 | | Elizabeth M. Allen | September 13, 2021 | April 4, 2022 | Joe Biden |
| - | | Elizabeth Trudeau (Acting) | April 4, 2022 | February 15, 2023 | Joe Biden |
| 4 | | William M. Russo | February 15, 2023 | April 6, 2024 | Joe Biden |
| - | | Mark Toner (Acting) | April 6, 2024 | June 28, 2024 | Joe Biden |
| - | | Kristin Kane (Senior Bureau Official) | July 1, 2024 | September 16, 2024 | Joe Biden |
| - | | Stephanie C. Sutton (Acting) | September 16, 2024 | January 20, 2025 | Joe Biden |
| - | | Michele P. Exner (Acting) | January 20, 2025 | March 19, 2025 | Donald Trump |
| 5 | | Michele P. Exner | March 19, 2025 | January 25, 2026 | Donald Trump |
| - | | Dylan Johnson (Acting) | January 26, 2026 | January 30, 2026 | Donald Trump |
| 6 | | Dylan Johnson | January 30, 2026 | Present | Donald Trump |
