= Robin Raphel =

American diplomat (born 1947)

Robin Lynn Raphel HPk
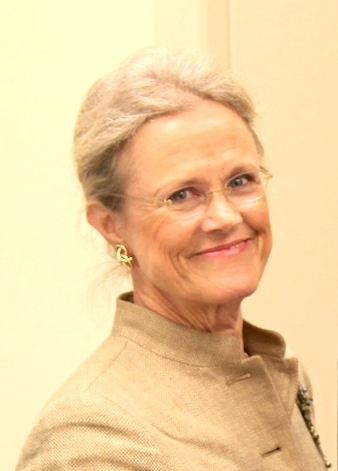
- Raphel at the Pakistani American Congress Annual Meeting, 2012

14th U.S. Ambassador to Tunisia
- In office 7 November 1997 – 6 August 2000
- President: Bill Clinton
- Preceded by: Mary Ann Casey
- Succeeded by: Rust Macpherson Deming

1st Assistant Secretary of State for South Asian Affairs
- In office 2 August 1993 – 27 June 1997
- President: Bill Clinton
- Preceded by: Position established
- Succeeded by: Karl Inderfurth

Personal details
- Born: Robin Lynn Johnson; 1947 (age 78–79) Vancouver, Washington, U.S.
- Spouse(s): Arnold L. Raphel (1972-1982); Leonard A. Ashton (1990-?)(div)
- Children: Two daughters: Alexandra and Anna
- Education: University of Washington, B.A. History & Economics (1965-1969); University of Maryland, M.A. Economics (1972-1974)
- Profession: Career diplomat Lobbyist; Government consultant
- Awards: Hilal-e-Pakistan

Robin Lynn Raphel HPk (born 1947) is an American former diplomat, ambassador, CIA analyst, lobbyist, and an expert on Pakistan affairs.

In 1993, she was appointed by President Bill Clinton as the Assistant Secretary of State for South and Central Asian Affairs. She later served as U.S. Ambassador to Tunisia from November 7, 1997 to August 6, 2000, during Clinton's second term in office. In the 2000s, Raphel held a number of South Asia-related diplomatic positions. She retired from the State Department in 2005 after 30 years of service.

After retirement, Raphel was hired to head the global affairs and trade group of Cassidy & Associates, a DC lobbying firm. She returned to the State Department in 2009 as a senior adviser on Pakistan under Richard Holbrooke, during the tenure of then Secretary of State Hillary Clinton. Until November 2, 2014, she served as coordinator for non-military assistance to Pakistan.

Raphel was the subject of a federal counterintelligence investigation. Surveillance of her communications began in February, 2013 and became public knowledge in October, 2014. She was suspected of being a Pakistani asset. After abandoning the claim that she had been spying, the FBI urged Raphel to plead guilty to mishandling classified documents. Raphel refused the plea deal, and in March 2016, the Justice Department declined to file charges against her.

== Early life and education ==
Robin Lynn Johnson was born in Vancouver, Washington in 1947 to Vera and Donald Johnson, a manager of an aluminum plant. She has two sisters, Karen Freeze and Deborah Johnson. She graduated from Longview's Mark Morris High School in 1965.

She received a B.A. in history and economics from the University of Washington in 1969. During her undergraduate years she studied history at the University of London, and would later return to England after graduation to study for a year at Cambridge University. In 1970, she took a position as a teacher at Damavand College, an Iranian women's college in Tehran, where she taught history for two years. She earned her master's degree in economics from the University of Maryland.

== Career ==
=== Early diplomatic career ===
Robin Raphel began her career in the U.S. government as an analyst at the CIA after graduating with her master's degree. After leaving Iran she joined the diplomatic corps and assisted USAID in Islamabad as an economics analyst. In 1978, Raphel returned to the United States and joined the State Department. She would take on a range of assignments for the next decade, including posts in London, until she was appointed as Political Counselor at the U.S. Embassy in Pretoria, South Africa in 1988. In 1991, she took the assignment of Political Counselor at the U.S. Embassy in New Delhi, India.

=== Assistant Secretary of State ===
In 1993, President Bill Clinton appointed Raphel as the first Assistant Secretary of State for South and Central Asian Affairs within the Bureau of South and Central Asian Affairs, a newly created position within the State Department focused on a growing array of problems in Afghanistan, Pakistan and India, including democratic stability, nuclear proliferation, energy access, Islamist and Taliban extremism, poverty and women's rights issues.

At the time, Pakistan had not tested its nuclear capabilities, opting for a policy of nuclear opacity. India's nuclear program was at the time also under the same undeclared status, which ended in 1998 with the Pokhran-II tests. Tensions between Pakistan and India over the unresolved dispute in Kashmir were threatening war between the two nations. Pakistan's armed forces and intelligence services were using Afghanistan's turmoil to create "strategic depth" by fostering alliances with the Taliban. Meanwhile, democracy's experiment in Pakistan was witnessing a revolving door of army-induced change between the governments of Benazir Bhutto and Nawaz Sharif.

==== India-Pakistan dispute over Kashmir ====
At the State Department, Raphel tried to reduce tensions between India and Pakistan by engaging both countries in a negotiated solution to their Kashmir dispute. Kashmir was raised on the agenda in Bhutto's first state visit to Washington in April 1995. It would remain a key topic of regional and bilateral discussions with both India and Pakistan throughout Clinton's two terms in office. She left the State Department's South Asia section in late June 1997.

==== Work with Taliban during the Afghan Civil War (1992–1996) ====
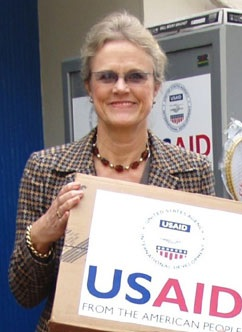
Robin Raphel delivers aid in Peshawar

During her tenure at the State Department, Raphel worked to support US government policy of engagement and collaboration with the Taliban. She was one of the first senior American officials to meet personally with Taliban.

One of the channels for U.S.-Taliban cooperation that she prioritized was through energy. U.S. energy policies in the mid-1990s sought to develop alternative supply routes to counter increasing tensions in the Middle East. The Clinton administration supported oil and gas pipelines to transport Turkmenistan's energy reserves through Afghanistan to an exit at Pakistan's Indian Ocean seaport of Gwadar. Unocal, an American company that was one of the many international oil companies seeking the rights to build this pipeline, entered into negotiations with Taliban, to secure protection for the pipeline.

Raphel spoke in favor of the pipeline project on trips to Afghanistan and Pakistan in April and August 1996. Her meeting with Taliban leaders in 1996 to advocate for a pipeline project earned her the sobriquet "Lady Taliban" in the Indian press. After Raphel's successor Karl Inderfurth took over, the pipeline deal collapsed, however.

Raphel took part in the State Department's establishment of diplomatic relations with the Taliban shortly after its takeover of Kabul in 1996.

==== Advocacy for Pakistan ====
Raphel entered her State Department assignment at a time when U.S.-Pakistan relations were strained. Sanctions imposed by George H. W. Bush over concerns about Pakistan's burgeoning nuclear program under the Pressler Amendment banned all military ties, supply of military hardware and jet fighters, and cut off political relations with Islamabad. Bhutto sought rapprochement with the Clinton White House, visiting the United States in April 1995. Bhutto, working with Pakistan's envoy to Washington at the time, Dr. Maleeha Lodhi, sought Congressional support for an exception to the Pressler Amendment that would allow Pakistan to take delivery of military equipment that it had already paid for. This exception to Pressler (known as the Brown Amendment) was strongly supported by Raphel and by other Clinton administration officials. It was put into effect in November 1995, permitting the one-time transfer to Pakistan of $368M of equipment that had been blocked by the Pressler Amendment.

===== Criticism from India =====
Raphel became unpopular with Indian media in 1993, after publicly describing Kashmir as a "disputed territory." India's position is that Jammu and Kashmir, having been ceded to India in 1947 by their maharajah, are an integral part of India's territory. Raphel's advocacy for negotiation between India and Pakistan was perceived as an attack on India's territorial integrity.

Also in the 1990s, Indian officials who had tapped Raphel's phone learned that she had favored a UN resolution condemning India's actions in Kashmir, but was overruled by 'higher-ups.'

Raphel's decades of work with Pakistan led Indian media to consider her a "brazenly pro-Pakistan partisan in Washington." According to Richard Leiby, writing about the 1993 incident in 2014 after the FBI investigation of Raphel became public knowledge:

To the fury of India, she suggested Pakistan still had valid claims to the disputed territory of Kashmir, saying the U.S. did not believe Kashmir "is forever more an integral part of India." Even now, Indian media berate Raphel and delight in her current difficulties.

=== Ambassador to Tunisia ===
In November 1997, Robin Raphel was appointed as United States Ambassador to Tunisia. Tunisia was a frequent partner for Mediterranean military exercises with U.S. naval squadrons and marine battalions, allowing more exercises in its waters than any other country in North Africa. When Raphel was ambassador, Stuart Eizenstat, the Undersecretary of State for Economics, Business and Agriculture, proposed a new initiative to liberalize trade further with Tunisia. The Eizenstat Initiative, as it came to be known informally, implemented lower tariffs on industrial and manufacturing sector goods to enable Tunisia to become a supplier for goods throughout Arab and African states. President Zine El Abidine visited the Clinton White House in 1999.

During her tenure, First Lady Hillary Clinton and Chelsea Clinton visited the country to support Tunisia's improving record in women's rights. Raphel witnessed the rise in political power of Tunisia's opposition as Abidine's administration reserved 20 percent of Parliament's seats for opposition candidates for the first time since he came to power. She served her full term and left in August 2000. Raphel was Senior Vice President at the National Defense University in Washington from 2000 until 2003. Raphel retired from service in 2005.

=== Post-retirement lobbyist ===
In 2005, soon after her retirement, Raphel began working for Cassidy & Associates, a Washington-based lobbying firm, where she headed the global affairs and trade group. Shortly after hiring Raphel as a senior vice president, Cassidy signed a $1.2 million contract to lobby for the government of Pakistan. Raphel was assigned to lead the contract. One month later, however, Cassidy canceled the Pakistan lobbying contract after Pakistan's president Pervez Musharraf declared emergency rule.

Raphel continued her role at Cassidy, lobbying for other international clients who included Bangladeshi politician Anwar Hossain Manju and the Iraqi Red Crescent Organization, according The Hill. On July 14, 2009, Cassidy signed a new one-year contract with the Pakistani Embassy, to "engage in efforts to improve Pakistan-U.S. relations and promote the development of U.S. policy beneficial to Pakistan and its interests."

=== AfPak diplomacy ===
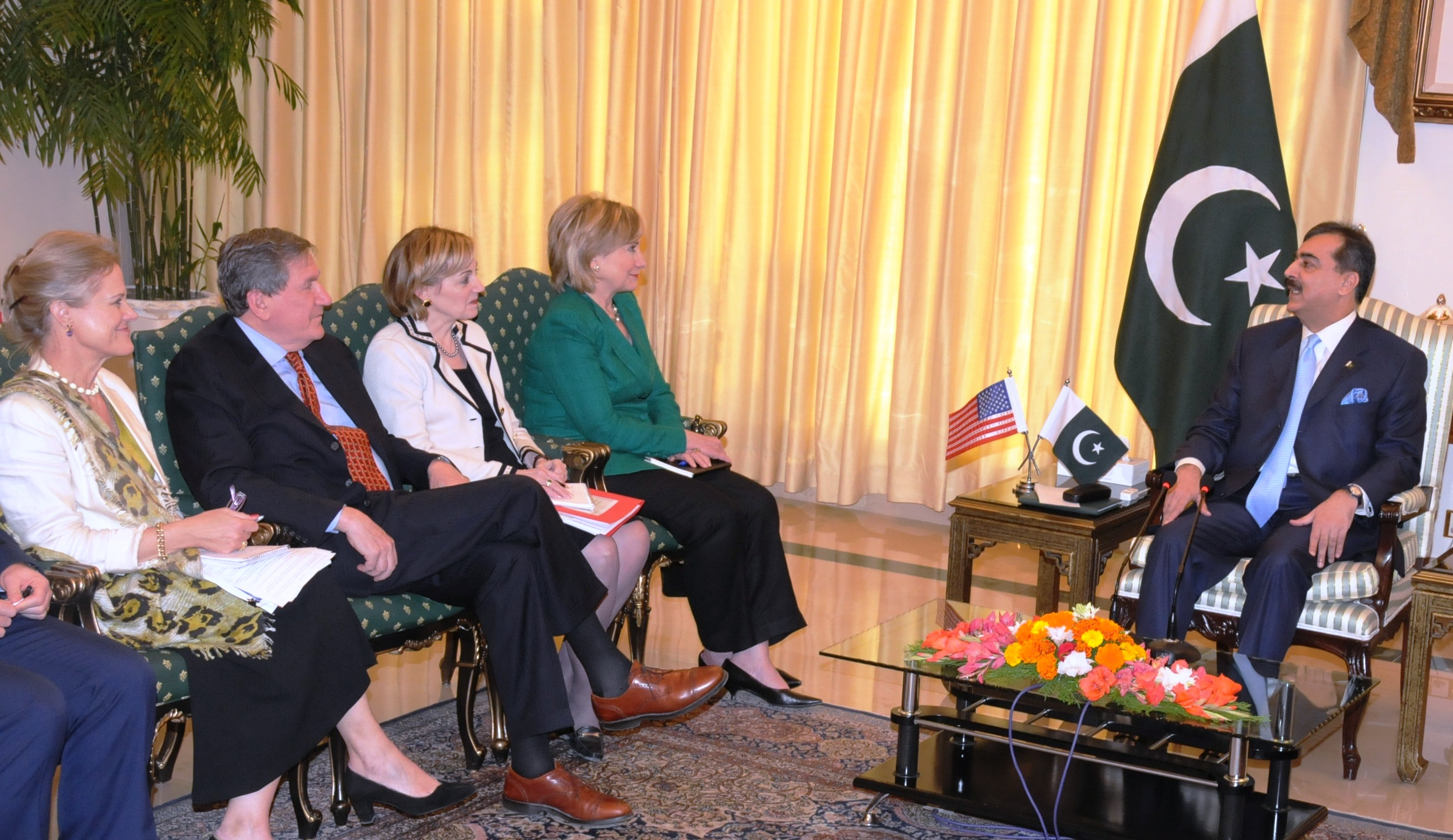
Robin Raphel (far left) with Richard Holbrooke, Ambassador Anne Patterson, Secretary of State Hillary Clinton and Prime Minister Yousef Raza Gilani in Pakistan, 2009

In 2009, Robin Raphel joined the Afghanistan-Pakistan task force known as AfPak, joining the late Richard Holbrooke, U.S. Special Representative for the region. Her focus was to allocate U.S. resources committed under the proposed Kerry-Lugar Bill. That legislation was enacted in late 2009, tripling civilian U.S. aid to Pakistan to approximately $1.5 billion annually.

Raphel's responsibilities included oversight of spending for law enforcement, improvements in Pakistan's judicial system and education programs to raise the country's literacy standards. She worked with USAID in a number of Pakistan's border areas in particular to distribute non-military assistance.

=== Recognition by Government Of Pakistan ===
In 2023, she was awarded Hilal-e-Pakistan, Pakistan's second-highest civil award, which recognizes "meritorious contribution to the national interests of Pakistan."

== FBI Investigation ==
In February 2013, the FBI began investigating Raphel, based on an intercepted conversation of a Pakistani official that raised suspicions Raphel might have provided secrets to the Pakistani government.

After obtaining warrants, investigators began to monitor Raphel's private conversations and Skype, and later (in January 2014) did a "sneak and peek" search of her home when she was away. During that search, they discovered some 20-year-old classified files in a file cabinet.

Raphel first learned of the investigation nearly two years after it began, on Oct. 21, 2014, when she encountered FBI agents searching her home. The State Department, based on information they received from the FBI, placed Raphel on administrative leave and withdrew her security clearance. Her contract with the State Department was allowed to expire on November 2, 2014.

By the spring of 2015, the Justice Department notified Raphel's attorney that she was no longer suspected of espionage. The NYT in October, 2015, reported, "officials now say the spying investigation has all but fizzled, leaving the Justice Department to decide whether to prosecute Ms. Raphel for the far less serious charge of keeping classified information in her home."

The FBI, having found no evidence that Raphel was spying or that she had illegally shared classified information, repeatedly pressed Raphel, as the price of ending their investigation, to plead guilty to mishandling classified information: the 20-year-old files found in her basement. Raphel refused the plea deals. In March 2016, the Justice Department formally closed the investigation, declining to file any charges against Raphel.

== Personal life ==
In 1972, Raphel married Arnold Lewis Raphel, later Ambassador to Pakistan, in Tehran. They divorced ten years later. Her subsequent marriage to Leonard A. Ashton (1990-?) also ended in divorce. She has two daughters: Alexandra and Anna. She is fluent in French and Urdu.

Diplomatic posts
Preceded by Inaugural holder	Assistant Secretary of State for South and Central Asian Affairs; 1993 –1997	Succeeded by Karl Inderfurth
Preceded by Mary Ann Casey	U.S. Ambassador to Tunisia; 1997–2000	Succeeded by Rust MacPherson Deming
