= Charles E. Redman =

United States diplomat (born 1943)

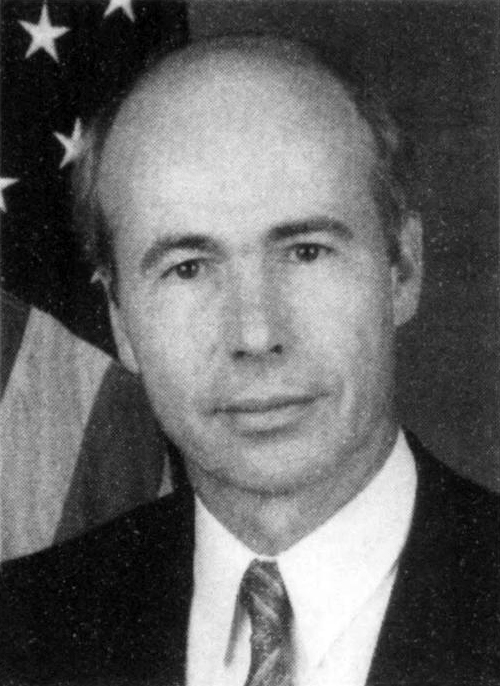
- Redman c. 1994

20th Assistant Secretary of State for Public Affairs
- In office June 29, 1987 – March 1, 1989
- Preceded by: Bernard Kalb
- Succeeded by: Margaret D. Tutwiler

12th Spokesperson for the United States Department of State
- In office 1986–1989
- Preceded by: Bernard Kalb
- Succeeded by: Margaret D. Tutwiler

Personal details
- Born: Charles Edgar Redman; December 24, 1943 (age 82) Waukegan, Illinois, U.S.
- Education: United States Air Force Academy; Harvard University

Charles Edgar Redman (born December 24, 1943) is a former United States diplomat. From 1987 to 1989, he was Assistant Secretary of State for Public Affairs. He served as United States Ambassador to Sweden from 1989 to 1992, and United States Ambassador to Germany from 1994 to 1996. In 1996, he joined Bechtel Group, Inc. as senior vice president. He graduated from the United States Air Force Academy and Harvard University.

== Additional sources ==
- Charles Edgar Redman on politicalgraveyard.com
- Bechtel Streamlines Organization, Announces Leadership Changes (June 1998)

Government offices
Preceded by Bernard Kalb	Assistant Secretary of State for Public Affairs; June 29, 1987 – March 1, 1989	Succeeded by Margaret D. Tutwiler
Diplomatic posts
Preceded by Gregory J. Newell	U.S. Ambassador to Sweden; 1989–1992	Succeeded by Thomas L. Siebert
Preceded by Richard Holbrooke	U.S. Ambassador to Germany; 1994–1996	Succeeded by James D. Bindenagel
