= Martin Waldron =

American newspaper reporter (1925–1981)

Martin Oliver "Mo" Waldron (February 2, 1925 – May 27, 1981) was an American newspaper reporter. His 1963 series of articles in the St. Petersburg Times exposed the state's "reckless, unchecked spending" on the construction of the Sunshine State Parkway, and was awarded the 1964 Pulitzer Prize for Public Service. At his death, he was The New York Times bureau chief in Trenton, New Jersey.

== Early life and education ==
Waldron was born on February 2, 1925, in Calcasieu Parish, Louisiana, and grew up there. He attended Middle Georgia College, Georgia Institute of Technology and Atlanta Law School, and earned his undergraduate degree from Birmingham–Southern College.

== Career ==
He worked as a reporter at The Atlanta Constitution, Birmingham Age-Herald / Birmingham Post-Herald, and The Tampa Tribune, gradually shifting to a focus on investigative journalism.

Waldron was with the St. Petersburg Times in 1963 when he wrote a series of articles (a total of 150,000 words) as part of the newspaper's exposé of cost overruns by the Florida Turnpike Authority (FTA). The FTA caused an estimated quadrupling of the cost of the Sunshine State Parkway to taxpayers, from initial estimates of $100 million. Waldron was able to break the story after receiving an anonymous call about excessive spending by FTA Chairman John Hammer, including allegations that he had paid for expensive hotels and meals, and corsages for his secretary, as well as overcharges for a chartered plane.

While investigating what it would take to spend $30 on a meal in 1963—at a time when two people could dine opulently for $15—Waldron and a fellow reporter went to an expensive Miami restaurant. They ordered Caesar salads, sirloin steaks, desserts and two brandies, and hit their $30 target only by adding a $5 tip and paying for the glasses that the brandy came in. His coverage earned the newspaper the 1964 Pulitzer Prize for Public Service, its first Pulitzer, and resulted in changes in the way that Florida managed highway construction projects.

Waldron moved to The New York Times in 1966, becoming the paper's bureau chief in Trenton, New Jersey, the state capital. His final reporting was a series about the business relationships between Atlantic City politicians and the local casinos. That series was also nominated for a Pulitzer Prize.

Over the course of his career, Waldron built a reputation as a tenacious reporter: "When he was on the trail of skullduggery, he was relentless and exuberant." He was remembered by colleagues as a "beefy, unkempt man". Former Florida Governor LeRoy Collins joked that Waldron's "idea of semiformal dress was having his shirttail in." Arthur Gelb, then deputy managing editor for The New York Times, recalled Waldron's large network of acquaintances: "[I]f Mo Waldron was in town, there would be a party somewhere, and everybody from the mayor on down would be there, and how he got all those people together, no one knew."

Waldron died of heart disease at age 56 on May 27, 1981, at his home in Hightstown, New Jersey. He was survived by his wife, author Ann Waldron, as well as a daughter and three sons.
