= Richard A. Boucher =

American diplomat (1951–2025)

Richard Boucher
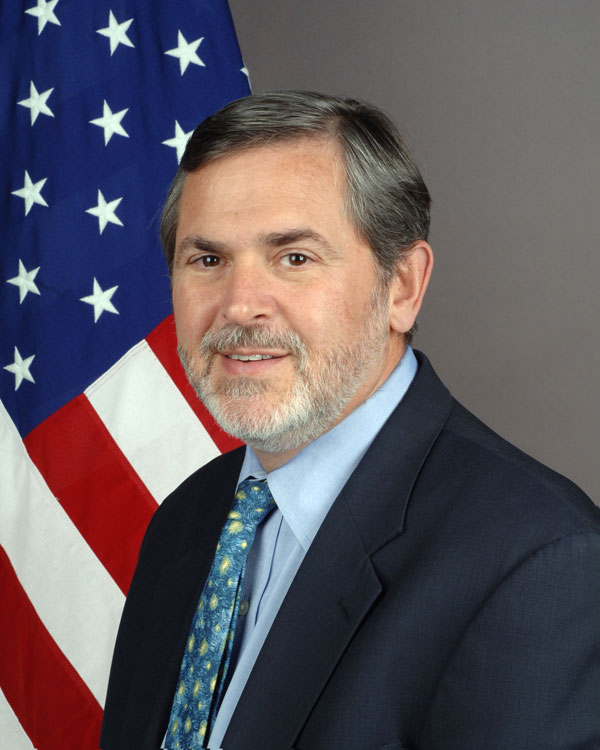

4th Assistant Secretary of State for South and Central Asian Affairs
- In office February 21, 2006 – January 20, 2009
- President: George W. Bush
- Preceded by: Christina B. Rocca
- Succeeded by: Robert O. Blake Jr.

24th Assistant Secretary of State for Public Affairs
- In office January 5, 2001 – June 2, 2005
- Preceded by: James Rubin
- Succeeded by: Sean McCormack

14th and 18th Spokesperson for the United States Department of State
- In office 2001–2005
- Preceded by: James Rubin
- Succeeded by: Sean McCormack
- In office 1992–1993
- Preceded by: Margaret D. Tutwiler
- Succeeded by: Mike McCurry

Personal details
- Born: December 13, 1951 Bethesda, Maryland, U.S.
- Died: June 27, 2025 (aged 73) Arlington, Virginia, U.S.
- Education: Tufts University; George Washington University

Richard Alan Boucher (December 13, 1951 – June 27, 2025) was an American diplomat who was deputy secretary-general of the Organisation for Economic Co-operation and Development (OECD) from 2009 until 2013. He took up post on November 5, 2009. Prior to joining OECD, he was the assistant secretary of state for South and Central Asian affairs, a position he assumed on February 21, 2006. The Bureau of South Asian Affairs was expanded to include the nations of Central Asia shortly before his confirmation.

== Career ==
In 2005, Boucher became the longest-serving assistant secretary of state for public affairs in the U.S. Department of State's history. He began his most recent tenure as spokesman for the State Department in May 2000 under Secretary Madeleine Albright and continued as spokesman throughout the tenure of Secretary Colin Powell and for Secretary Condoleezza Rice until June 2005. He had previously served as the department's deputy spokesman under Secretary Baker, starting in 1989, and became the spokesman for Secretary Eagleburger in August 1992 and for Secretary Christopher until June 1993.

Boucher’s early career focused on economic affairs, China and Europe. From October 1993 to June 1996 he served as ambassador to Cyprus, and from 1996 to 1999 he headed the U.S. Consulate General in Hong Kong as the consul general. He led U.S. efforts as the U.S. senior official for Asia-Pacific Economic Cooperation (APEC) from July 1999 to April 2000.

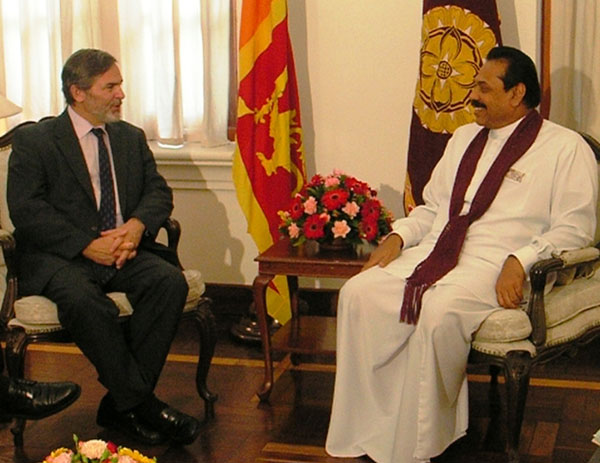
Richard Boucher with former Sri Lanka President Mahinda Rajapakse

After joining the Foreign Service in 1977, Boucher received Mandarin training at the Foreign Service Institute's Chinese Language School in Taichung, Taiwan, before transferring to the Embassy chancery in Taipei in 1978 (the diplomatic ties between Taipei and Washington severed on the same year, thus ending the operation of embassy in 1979). He then served at the Consulate General in Guangzhou from 1979 to 1980. After that he went back to Washington D.C. to serve in the State Department's Economic Bureau, and on the China Desk. He returned to China from 1984 to 1986 as deputy principal officer at the U.S. Consulate General in Shanghai, and then went back to Washington in July 1986, where he served in the State Department's Operations Center and as the deputy director of the Office of European Security and Political Affairs. He served as a contractor of the USAID, and served as a Peace Corps volunteer in Senegal, from 1973 to 1975.

Boucher was a Foreign Service officer with the personal rank of career ambassador, the highest rank obtainable by a Foreign Service officer, and was also the longest-serving assistant secretary for public affairs in the Department of State’s history.

In 2020, Boucher, along with over 130 other former Republican national security officials, signed a statement that asserted that U.S. President Donald Trump was unfit to serve another term, and "To that end, we are firmly convinced that it is in the best interest of our nation that Vice President Joe Biden be elected as the next President of the United States, and we will vote for him."

== Education ==
Fluent in Chinese and French, Boucher obtained his bachelor's degree in 1973 at Tufts University in English and French literature and did graduate work in economics at the George Washington University. He was until his death a senior fellow in international and public affairs at the Watson Institute for International and Public Affairs at Brown University.

== Death ==
Richard Boucher died at his home in Arlington, Virginia, on June 27, 2025, from spindle cell sarcoma. He was 73.

== Sources ==
- "Notable Former Volunteers / Foreign Service". Peace Corps official site. Accessed January 5, 2007.
- "Richard Boucher | Watson Institute". Watson Institute faculty page. Accessed November 13, 2017.

Government offices
Preceded by James Rubin	Assistant Secretary of State for Public Affairs; January 5, 2001 – June 2, 2005	Succeeded by Sean McCormack
Preceded by Christina B. Rocca	Assistant Secretary of State for South and Central Asian Affairs; February 21, 2006 – 2009	Succeeded by Robert O. Blake, Jr.
Diplomatic posts
Preceded by Robert E. Lamb	United States Ambassador to Cyprus; 1993–1996	Succeeded by Kenneth C. Brill
Preceded by Richard W. Mueller	United States Consuls-General for Hong Kong and Macau; August 1996 – July 1999	Succeeded by Michael Klosson
