= Sean McCormack =

American government official

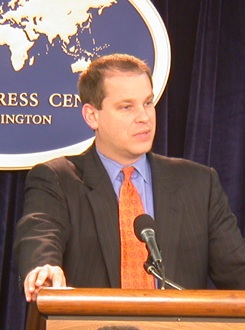
- Sean McCormack

25th Assistant Secretary of State for Public Affairs
- In office June 2, 2005 – January 20, 2009
- President: George W. Bush
- Preceded by: Richard Boucher
- Succeeded by: Philip J. Crowley

19th Spokesperson for the United States Department of State
- In office June 2, 2005 – January 20, 2009
- President: George W. Bush
- Preceded by: Richard Boucher
- Succeeded by: Ian C. Kelly

Personal details
- Born: 1964 (age 61–62)
- Education: Colby College; University of Maryland

Sean McCormack (born 1964) is the Vice President of Communications at Chevron U.S.A. Inc. McCormack is responsible for corporate and brand communications, in addition to reputation management, employee and executive communications.

He is a former United States Assistant Secretary of State, sworn in as Assistant Secretary of State for Public Affairs and Department Spokesman on June 2, 2005, and served until January 20, 2009. He is also the former VP of Communications for Boeing Commercial Airplanes.

== Education ==
McCormack graduated from Colby College in 1986 with a bachelor's degree in economics. He received an M.A. in international relations from the University of Maryland, College Park in 1990.

== Career ==
McCormack started as an analyst at the Meridian Corporation, working on issues related to arms control and non-proliferation.

In 2001, he became the Deputy White House Press Secretary and NSC Spokesman at the White House. He then worked at the U.S. Department of State as the Spokesman and Assistant Secretary for Public Affairs.

McCormack joined Boeing in 2009 and served as the Vice President of Communications in Government Operations in the Washington DC office of Boeing until 2014.

McCormack was then a Managing Director at TrailRunner International, a global communications consultancy, prior to joining Chevron.

In November 2022, McCormack joined Chevron as the Vice President of Communications.

=== Department of State ===
McCormack began his career in the Foreign Service in 1995. He served at the U.S. embassy in Ankara from 1996 to 1998, where he was assigned as the Persian-speaking officer in the consular section. He was posted to the U.S. embassy in Algiers from 1998 to 1999, with responsibility for economic reporting and consular issues.

McCormack was posted to the State Department Operations Center in 1999 before moving to the Executive Secretariat Staff ("The Line"). He was detailed to the National Security Council Staff in 2001.

Immediately prior to returning to the State Department, McCormack was Special Assistant to the President, Spokesman for the National Security Council, and Deputy White House Press Secretary for Foreign Policy.

Government offices
| Preceded by Richard Boucher | Assistant Secretary of State for Public Affairs; June 2, 2005 – January 20, 2009 | Succeeded by Philip J. Crowley |
