= The Christian Science Monitor =

News outlet owned by Christian Science church

- ... to injure no man, but to bless all mankind.

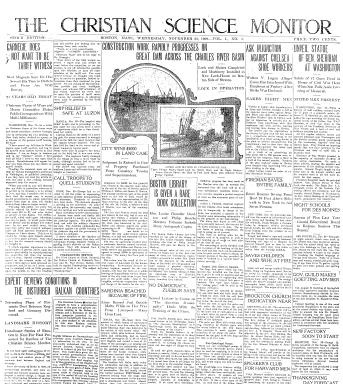
- First issue of the Christian Science Monitor – November 25, 1908
- Type: Weekly newspaper
- Owner: Christian Science Publishing Society
- Editor: Christa Case Bryant
- Founded: 1908; 118 years ago
- Headquarters: 210 Massachusetts Avenue; Boston, Massachusetts, U.S. 02115
- ISSN: 0882-7729
- OCLC number: 35351012
- Website: csmonitor.com

The Christian Science Monitor (CSM), commonly known as The Monitor, is a nonprofit news organization that publishes daily articles both in electronic format and a weekly print edition. It was founded in 1908 as a daily newspaper by Mary Baker Eddy, founder of the new religious movement Christian Science and the Church of Christ, Scientist.

Since its founding, the newspaper has been based in Boston. Over its existence, seven Monitor journalists have been awarded the Pulitzer Prize, including Edmund Stevens (1950), John Hughes (1968), Howard James (1968), Robert Cahn (1969), Richard Strout (1978), David S. Rohde (1996), and Clay Bennett (2002).

== History ==
=== 20th century ===
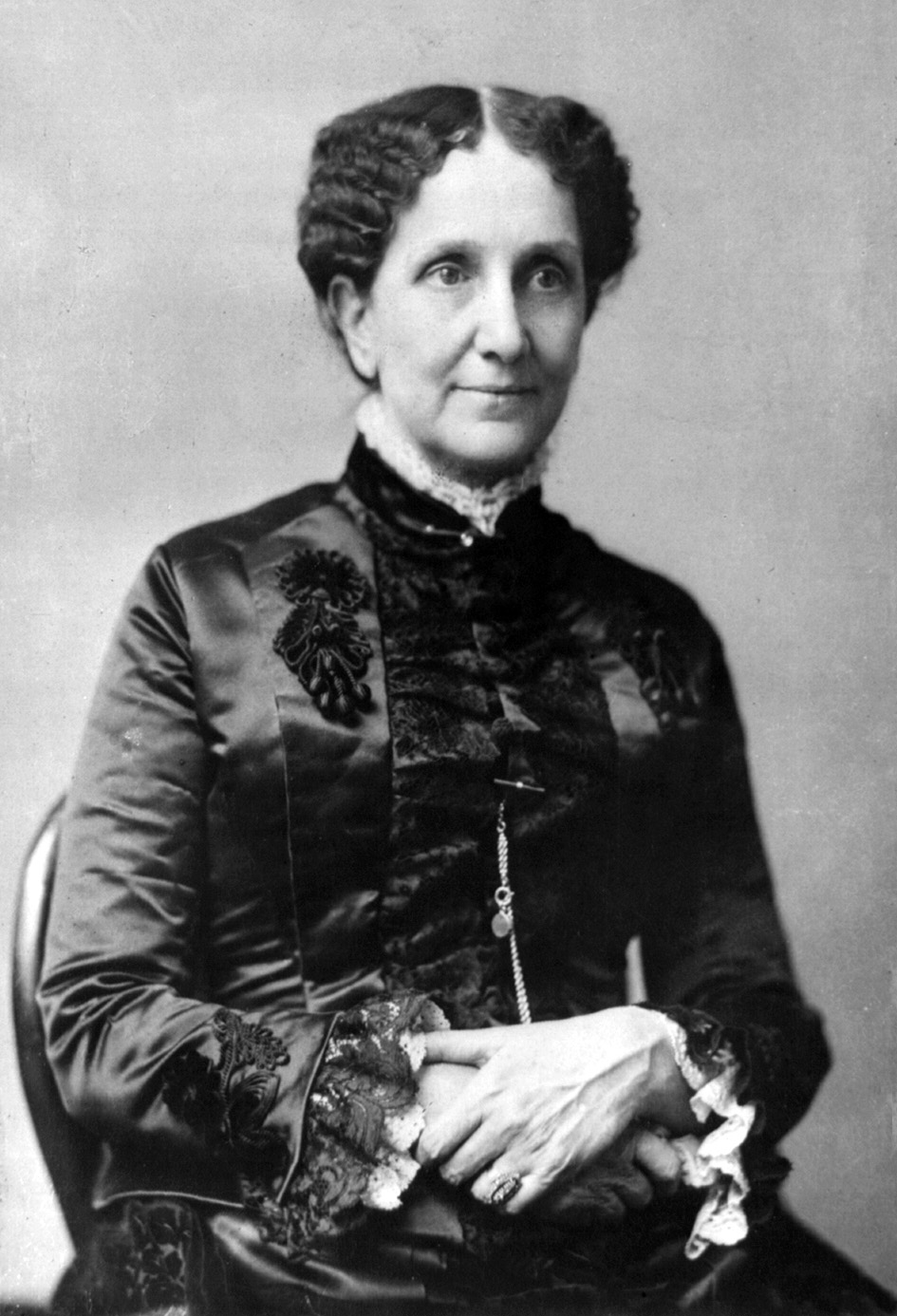
Mary Baker Eddy, who founded The Monitor in 1908

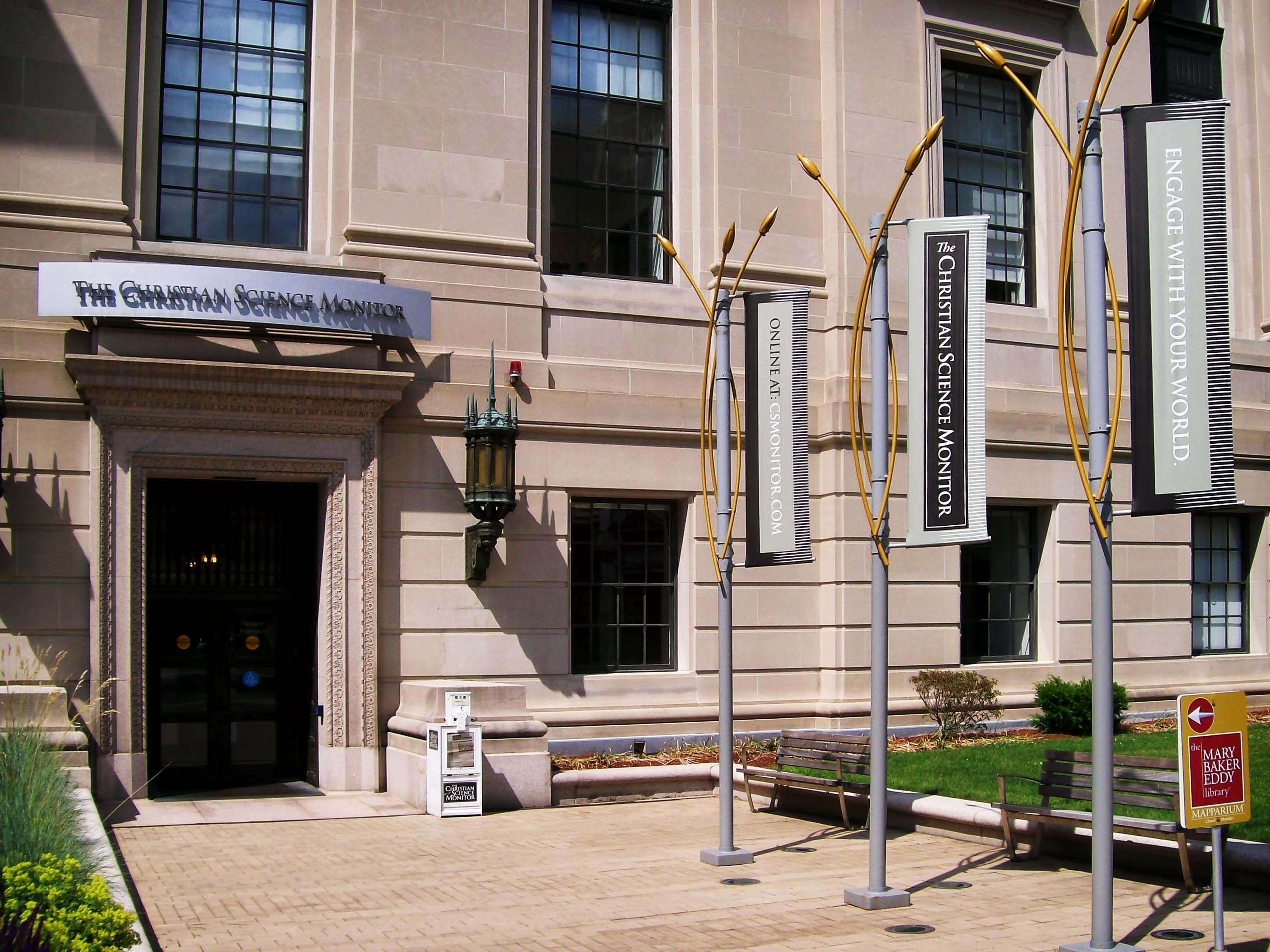
Headquarters of The Christian Science Monitor on Massachusetts Avenue in Boston

The Monitor was founded in 1908 in part as a response by Mary Baker Eddy to New York World's consistent criticism of Eddy. Eddy required the inclusion of "Christian Science" in the paper's name, over initial opposition by some of her advisors.

Eddy also saw a need to counteract the fear often spread by media reporting:

Looking over the newspapers of the day, one naturally reflects that it is dangerous to live, so loaded with disease seems the very air. These descriptions carry fears to many minds, to be depicted in some future time upon the body. A periodical of our own will counteract to some extent this public nuisance; for through our paper, at the price at which we shall issue it, we shall be able to reach many homes with healing, purifying thought.

Eddy declared that The Monitor's mission should be "to injure no man, but to bless all mankind."

MonitoRadio was a radio service produced by the Church of Christ Scientist between 1984 and 1997. It featured several one-hour news broadcasts a day, as well as top-of-the-hour news bulletins. The service was widely heard on public radio stations throughout the United States. The Monitor later launched an international broadcast over shortwave radio, called the World Service of the Christian Science Monitor. Weekdays were news-led, but weekend schedules were exclusively dedicated to religious programming. The shortwave service ceased operations on June 28, 1997.

In 1986, The Monitor started producing a current affairs television series The Christian Science Monitor Reports, which was distributed via syndication to television stations across the United States. In 1988, The Christian Science Monitor Reports won a Peabody Award for a series of reports on Islamic fundamentalism. That same year, the program was cancelled, and The Monitor created a daily television program World Monitor, anchored by former NBC correspondent John Hart, which was initially shown on the Discovery Channel. In 1991, World Monitor moved to the Monitor Channel, a 24-hour news and information channel launched on May 1, 1991, with programming from its Boston TV station WQTV. The only religious programming on the channel was a five-minute Christian Science program early each morning. In 1992, after eleven months on the air, the service was shut down amid huge financial losses. Programming from the Monitor Channel was also carried nationally via the WWOR EMI Service, a nationally oriented feed of WWOR-TV, a New Jersey–based television station launched in 1990 to comply with the syndication exclusivity laws put into place the year prior.

=== 21st century ===
Front page of the April 26, 2009 edition

The print edition continued to struggle for readership, and, in 2004, faced a renewed mandate from the church to earn a profit. Subsequently, The Monitor began relying more on the Internet as part of its business model. The Monitor was one of the first newspapers to put its text online in 1996 and also one of the first to launch a PDF edition in 2001. It was also an early pioneer of RSS feeds.

In 2005, Richard Bergenheim, a Christian Science practitioner, was named editor. Shortly before his death in 2008, Bergenheim was replaced by veteran Boston Globe editor and former Monitor reporter John Yemma.

In 2006, Jill Carroll, a freelance reporter on an assignment for The Monitor, was kidnapped in Baghdad. Although Carroll was a freelancer, the paper worked tirelessly for her release and hired her as a staff writer shortly after her abduction to ensure that she had financial benefits. She was released safely after 82 days. Beginning in August 2006, the Monitor published an account of Carroll's kidnapping and subsequent release, with first-person reporting from Carroll and others involved.

In October 2008, citing net losses of US$18.9 million per year versus US$12.5 million in annual revenue, The Monitor announced that it would cease printing daily and instead print weekly editions. The last daily print edition was published on March 27, 2009.

The weekly magazine follows on from The Monitor's London edition, also a weekly, which launched in 1960, and the weekly World Edition, which replaced the London edition in 1974. Mark Sappenfield became the editor in March 2017. Christa Case Bryant succeeded him in February 2025.

== Reporting ==
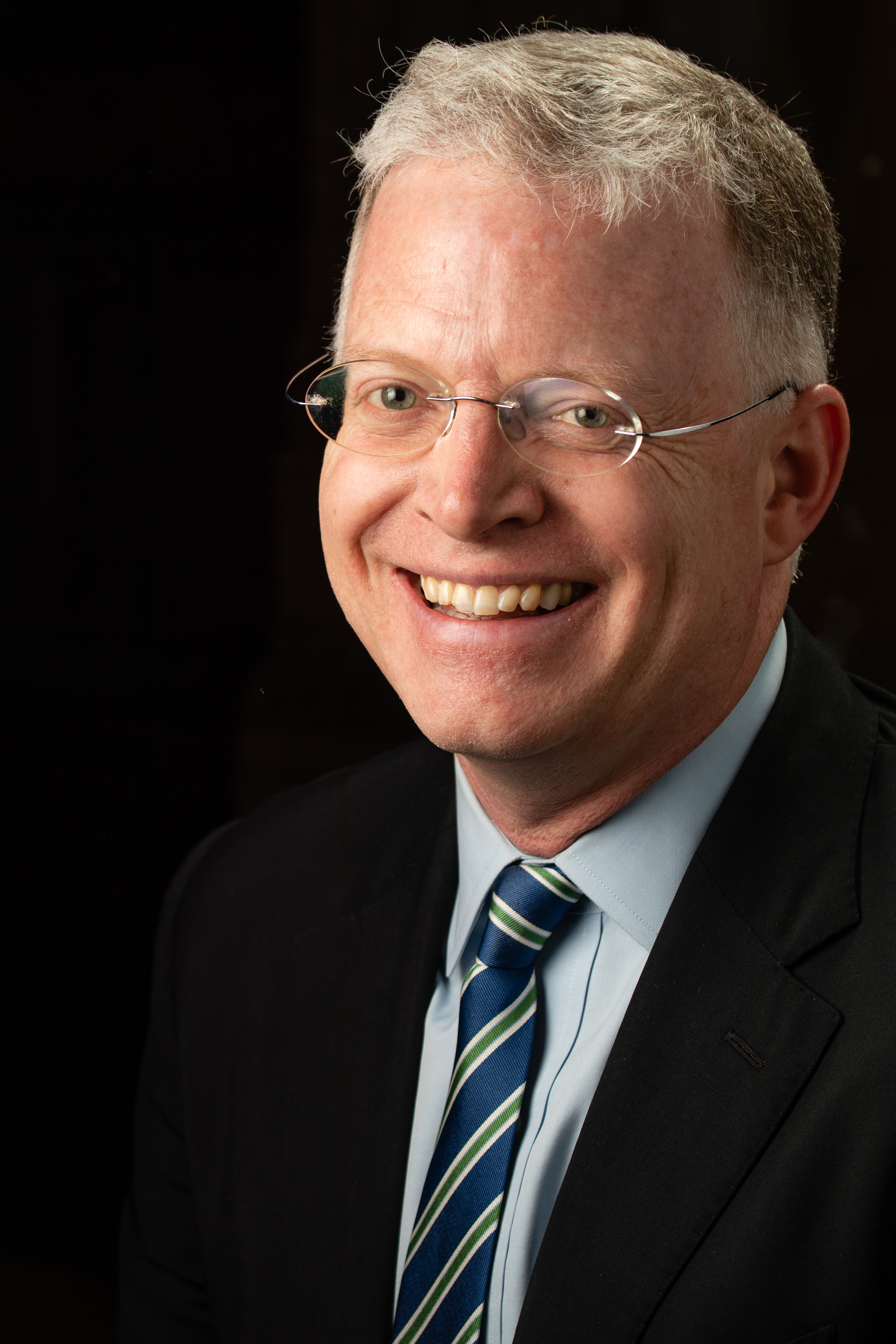
David S. Rohde, one of seven Christian Science Monitor editors and journalists to be awarded a Pulitzer Prize since the newspaper's founding

The Christian Science Monitor is not primarily a religious-themed paper and does not evangelize, though each issue of the paper does usually contain a single religious-themed article in the Home Forum section, generally related to a topic from the day's news. The paper reports on issues including natural disasters, disease and mental health issues, homelessness, terrorism, and death. The paper's editorials have advocated against government interference in an individual's right to choose their own form of healthcare. They also support the separation of church and state, and the paper has opposed efforts to teach fundamentalist interpretations of the Bible in science classrooms.

In 1997, the Washington Report on Middle East Affairs, a publication critical of United States policy in the Middle East, praised The Monitor for its objective and informative coverage of Islam and the Middle East.

During the 27 years while Nelson Mandela was in prison in South Africa after having been convicted of sabotage, among other charges, The Christian Science Monitor was one of the newspapers he was allowed to read. Five months after his release, Mandela visited Boston and stopped by The Monitor offices, telling the staff, "The Monitor continues to give me hope and confidence for the world's future" and thanking them for their "unwavering coverage of apartheid". Mandela called The Monitor "one of the more important voices covering events in South Africa".

During the era of McCarthyism, a term first coined by The Monitor, the paper was one of the earliest critics of U.S. Senator Joseph McCarthy.

== Circulation ==
The paper's circulation has ranged widely, from a peak of over 223,000 in 1970 to just under 56,000 shortly before the suspension of the daily print edition in 2009. Partially in response to declining circulation and the struggle to earn a profit, the church's directors and the manager of the Christian Science Publishing Society were purportedly forced to plan cutbacks and closures (later denied), which led in 1989 to the mass protest resignations by its chief editor Kay Fanning (an ASNE president and former editor of the Anchorage Daily News), managing editor David Anable, associate editor David Winder, and several other newsroom staff. Those developments also presaged administrative moves to scale back the print newspaper in favor of expansions into radio, a magazine, shortwave broadcasting, and television. Expenses, however, rapidly outpaced revenues, contradicting predictions by church directors. On the brink of bankruptcy, the board was forced to close the broadcast programs in 1992.

By late 2011, The Monitor was receiving an average of about 22 million hits per month on its website, slightly below the Los Angeles Times. In 2017, the Monitor put up a paywall on its content, and in 2018, there were approximately 10,000 subscriptions to the Monitor Daily email service. As of September 2023, the number of hits had fallen to 1 million per month.

== Notable editors and staff (past and present) ==
- Willis J. Abbot, editor and author
- Clay Bennett, Pulitzer Prize-winning cartoonist
- Richard Bergenheim, editor
- Erwin Canham, editor and author
- Jill Carroll, reporter, kidnapped for 82 days in 2006
- William Henry Chamberlin, reporter, author
- Grover Clark, China correspondent
- John K. Cooley, longtime contributing editor
- Roscoe Drummond, longtime reporter and editor
- Kay Fanning, editor, first woman to edit an American national newspaper
- John Gould, longtime columnist and author
- Roland R. Harrison, editor
- Joseph C. Harsch, CBE, longtime reporter
- Sir Harold Hobson, longtime drama critic
- Mary J. Hornaday, vice president of the Overseas Press Club
- John Hughes, Pulitzer Prize winner, editor, author
- Reuben H. Markham, longtime reporter, author
- Luix Overbea, journalist, founding member of National Association of Black Journalists
- Scott Peterson, longtime reporter and author
- Cora Rigby, first woman at a major paper to head a Washington, D.C. news bureau and Women's National Press Club co-founder
- David S. Rohde, Pulitzer Prize winner
- Mark Sappenfield, editor
- Richard Strout, Pulitzer Prize winner
- Godfrey Sperling, columnist
- Nate White, Gerald Loeb Newspaper Award winner
- Colin Woodard, correspondent
- Paul Wohl, political commentator

== Awards ==
Staff of The Monitor have been recipients of seven Pulitzer Prizes for their work on The Monitor:

- 1950, Pulitzer Prize for International Reporting: Edmund Stevens, for his series of 43 articles written over a three-year residence in Moscow entitled, "This Is Russia Uncensored".
- 1967, Pulitzer Prize for International Reporting: R. John Hughes, For his thorough reporting of Indonesia's attempted Transition to the New Order in 1965 and the purge that followed in 1965–66.
- 1968, Pulitzer Prize for National Reporting: Howard James, for his series of articles, Crisis in the Courts.
- 1969, Pulitzer Prize for National Reporting: Robert Cahn, for his inquiry into the future of the United States' national parks and the methods that may help to preserve them.
- 1978, Pulitzer Prize Special Citations and Awards, Journalism: Richard Strout, for distinguished commentary from Washington, D.C. over many years as staff correspondent for The Christian Science Monitor and as a contributor to The New Republic.
- 1996, Pulitzer Prize for International Reporting: David Rohde, for his persistent on-site reporting of the slaughter of thousands of Bosnian Muslims in the Srebrenica genocide.
- 2002, Pulitzer Prize for Editorial Cartooning: Clay Bennett

== In popular culture ==
In Aldous Huxley's 1932 dystopian novel Brave New World, Christianity is replaced by a pseudo-religion focused on a deified Henry Ford, and The Monitor, while still being published, changes its name to The Fordian Science Monitor.

In Sylvia Plath's 1963 novel The Bell Jar, The Christian Science Monitor is noted by Esther Greenwood as the only thing delivered to her mother's house, and that she could not read it due to how it "...treated suicides and sex crimes and airplane crashes as if they didn't happen", preferring tabloid journalism instead.
