= Willis J. Abbot =

American journalist, editor, and a prolific historical and biographical author

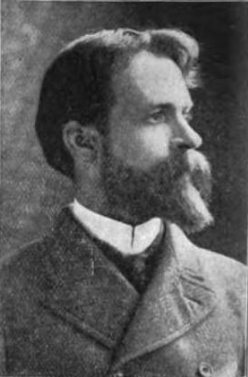
- Willis John Abbot
- Born: March 16, 1863; New Haven, Connecticut
- Died: May 19, 1934 (aged 71)
- Education: University of Michigan (LL.B.)
- Occupations: Journalist, editor, and author
- Spouse: Marie A. Mack

Willis John Abbot (March 16, 1863 – May 19, 1934) was an American journalist, editor, and a prolific historical and biographical author. Many of his works focused on war, army, navy, marine corps, and merchant marines.

== Biography ==
Born in New Haven, Connecticut, to Waldo Abbot and Julia Holmes, he was a graduate of the University of Michigan in 1884. He was married to Marie A. Mack in 1887 and became managing editor of the Chicago Times during 1892–93. From 1896 to 1898 he was editor for the New York Journal. In 1905 he joined the New York American. In 1908 he served the Chicago Tribune as one of the earliest political correspondents in the American Midwest.

Abbot wrote for the Hearst's New York Journal American in 1921. Later, he was named the editor of The Christian Science Monitor, a position which he held from 1922 to 1927.

Abbot was among the founding editors of the American Society of Newspaper Editors. He played a role leading the movement for Ethics Enforcement with Herbert Bayard Swope working on the constitution of the ANSE. All these actions taken towards ethics amelioration was seen negatively by president Hopwood. Throughout this ethics debate Abbot was on the board of directors of the ANSE. He later served as president of the ANSE.

== Published works (partial list) ==
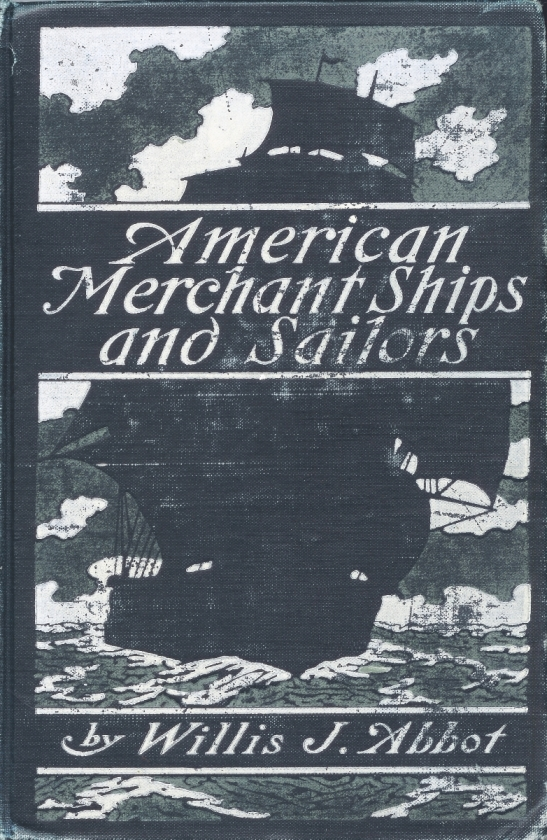
Front cover of American Merchant Ships and Sailors

- Battle-Fields of '61 - A Narrative of the Military Operations of the War for the Union Up to the End of the Peninsular Campaign - Dodd, Mead, and Company, New York, 1889 - With Illustrations by W. C. Jackson
- Battle-Fields and Campfires - A Narrative of the Principal Military Operations of the Civil War From the Removal of McClellan to the Accession of Grant (1862 - 1663) - Dodd, Mead, and Company, New York, 1890 - With Illustrations by W. C. Jackson
- Battle-Fields and Victory - A Narrative of the Principal Military Operations of the Civil War From the Accession of Grant to the End of the War - Dodd, Mead, and Company, New York, 1891 - With Illustrations by W. C. Jackson
- Blue-Jackets of '76 - A History of the Naval Battles of the American Revolution - Together with a Narrative of the War with Tripoli - Dodd, Mead, and Company, New York, 1888 - With Illustrations by W. C. Jackson and H. W. McVickar
- Blue-Jackets of 1812 - A History of the Naval Battles of the Second War With Great Britain - To Which is Prefixed an Account of the French War of 1798 - Dodd, Mead, and Company, New York, 1887 - With Illustrations by W. C. Jackson and H. W. McVickar
- Blue-Jackets of 1918 - Being the Story of the Work of the American Navy in the World War - Dodd, Mead, and Company, New York, 1921 - With Illustrations by W. C. Jackson and H. W. McVickar
- Naval History of the United States, Volume 1, a re-issue of the Blue-Jackets of '76, and part of Blue-Jackets of 1812. Peter Fenelon Collier, New York, 1886, 1887, 1888, 1890 - With Illustrations by W. C. Jackson and H. W. McVickar
- Naval History of the United States, Volume 2, a re-issue of part of Blue-Jackets of 1812, Blue-Jackets of '61, and Blue-Jackets in Time of Peace. Peter Fenelon Collier, New York, 1886, 1887, 1888, 1890 - With Illustrations by W. C. Jackson and H. W. McVickar
- American Merchant Ships and Sailors - Dodd, Mead, and Company, New York, 1902 - With Illustrations by Ray Brown
- The Story of Our Merchant Marine - Its Period of Glory, Its Prolonged Decadence and Its Vigorous Revival as the Result of the World War - a re-issue of American Merchant Ships and Sailors - Dodd, Mead, and Company, New York, 1902, 1919 - With Illustrations by Ray Brown
- Soldiers of the Sea - The Story of the United States Marine Corps - Dodd, Mead, and Company, New York, 1918 - With Photographs
- Panama and the Canal - in Picture and Prose - a Complete Story of Panama, as Well as the History, Purpose and Promise of Its World-Famous Canal - The Most Gigantic Engineering Undertaking Since the Dawn of Time - Syndicate Publishing Company, London, New York, Toronto, 1913 - Water-Colors By E. J. Read and Gordon Grant, with Over 600 Photographs Taken by Staff
- The Nations at War - A Current History - Illustrated with Many Plates in Full Color, Photographs From Private Sources, Maps, Charts, and Diagrams - Syndicate Publishing Company, 1914 (revised editions published in 1916, 1917 and 1918 by Leslie-Judge Company, New York)
- Pictorial History of the World War - Leslie-Judge Company, New York, 1918 - With Numerous Illustrations from Drawings by the Foremost War Artists and Photographs Taken in the Field by Experts of Every Nation
- The United States in the Great War - Leslie-Judge Company, New York, 1919 - With Many Illustrations from Drawings, in Color and Black and White, and Photographs Taken by Experts, Many of Them Under Fire.
- Notable Women in History - the Lives of Women Who in All Ages, All Lands and in All Womanly Occupations Have Won Fame and Put Their Imprint on the World's History - The John C. Winston Company, Philadelphia, 1912 - Illustrated
- Watching the World Go By - Little, Brown, and Company, Boston, 1933 (autobiography)
- Aircraft and Submarines, the Story of the Invention, Development, and Present-day Uses of War's Newest Weapons - G. P. Putnam's and Sons, New York and London, 1918
- The Battle of 1900 - An Official Hand-Book for Every American Citizen - Issues and Platforms of All Parties - with Portraits and biographies of the Leaders - Including the Lives of the Presidential Candidates - Co-Authored with L. White Busby, Oliver W. Stewart, and Dr. Howard S. Taylor - Monarch Book Company, Chicago and Philadelphia, 1900
- Watching the World Go By - Little, Brown, and Company, Boston, Copyright © 1933, September 1933, Reprinted January 1934 - With Illustrations (Autobiographical)
