= Hodding Carter III =

American journalist (1935–2023)

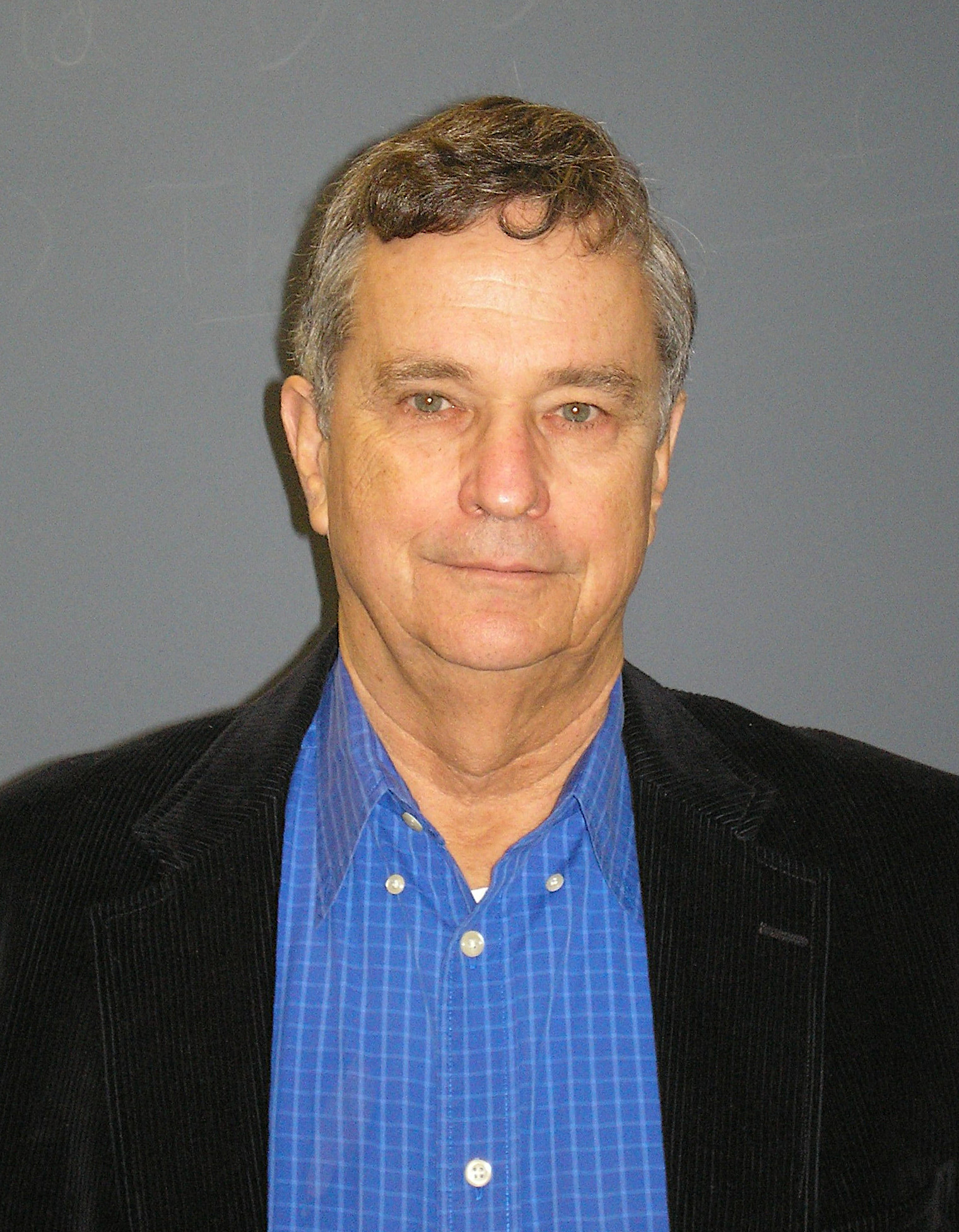
- Carter in 2006

15th United States Assistant Secretary of State for Public Affairs
- In office March 25, 1977 – June 30, 1980
- President: Jimmy Carter
- Preceded by: John E. Reinhardt
- Succeeded by: William J. Dyess

7th Spokesperson for the United States Department of State
- In office March 25, 1977 – June 30, 1980
- President: Jimmy Carter
- Preceded by: Robert Anderson
- Succeeded by: William J. Dyess

Personal details
- Born: William Hodding Carter III; April 7, 1935 New Orleans, Louisiana, U.S.
- Died: May 11, 2023 (aged 88) Chapel Hill, North Carolina, U.S.
- Party: Democratic
- Spouses: Margaret A. Wolfe (m. 1957; div. 1978); Patricia M. Derian (m. 1978; died 2016); Patricia O'Brien (m. 2019)
- Children: 4, including Finn
- Parent: Hodding Carter (father)
- Education: Princeton University
- Profession: Journalist; civil servant; professor

William Hodding Carter III (April 7, 1935 – May 11, 2023) was an American journalist and politician who served as Assistant Secretary of State for Public Affairs under President Jimmy Carter. He frequently appeared on the news and provided updates during the Iran hostage crisis.

== Early life ==
Carter was born in New Orleans in 1935, the son of newspaper editor Hodding Carter and Betty Werlein Carter. He was raised in Greenville, Mississippi, where his father founded the Greenville Delta Democrat-Times, and was educated at Phillips Exeter Academy, Greenville High School, and Princeton University. He was in the United States Marine Corps from 1957 to 1959, before joining the staff of his father's newspaper.

== Career ==
=== Journalism ===
While with the Delta Democrat-Times, Carter wrote the book The South Strikes Back. He won the Sigma Delta Chi National Profession Journalism Society Award for Editorial Writing in 1961.

In the 1960s, Carter was involved in the Civil Rights Movement, both editorially and in political action. In 1968, he co-chaired the "Loyal Democrats of Mississippi" that replaced Mississippi's previously all-white delegation to the Democratic National Convention, but later criticized the Delta Ministry (part of the biracial coalition) in his editorials.

=== Political career ===
In 1964, he worked on Lyndon B. Johnson's presidential campaign, but Johnson and his vice-presidential choice, U.S. Senator Hubert Humphrey of Minnesota, received only 13 percent of the vote in Mississippi in the last election held prior to passage of the Voting Rights Act of 1965. Carter also worked on the 1976 campaign of Jimmy Carter. President Carter appointed him Assistant Secretary of State for Public Affairs and State Department spokesman.

During the Iran hostage crisis in 1979 and 1980, Carter regularly appeared on network evening news, coming into the public eye much more frequently than most of his predecessors and successors.

=== Later work ===
When Ronald Reagan was elected in 1980, Carter left his post in the government and moved into television as a major critic of Reagan's policies. Up until 1994, he held various positions for ABC, BBC, CBC, CNN, NBC, and PBS, including anchor, political commentator, panelist, and reporter. His most notable television work was as the host of the media criticism show Inside Story on PBS. Throughout the 1980s, he was one of the rotating guest panelists for the roundtable segment of This Week with David Brinkley, while he also regularly wrote op-ed columns for various newspapers including The Wall Street Journal. He gave the 1986 commencement speech at George Washington University.

Beginning in 1994, he served as the Knight Professor of Public Affairs Journalism at the University of Maryland, College Park. He resigned the post in 1998 to become the president of the Knight Foundation. He served on a commission funded by the foundation, the Knight Commission on Intercollegiate Athletics.

Carter then lectured at universities all over the country and continued to do freelance work for the television and print media. His final position was University Professor of Leadership and Public Policy at the University of North Carolina at Chapel Hill.

Carter contributed to After Snowden: Privacy, Secrecy, and Security in the Information Age, published in May 2015.

== Personal life ==
Carter had no family relationship to Jimmy Carter.

Carter was married three times: first to Margaret Ainsworth, from 1957 until their divorce in 1978, then to Patricia M. Derian, from 1978 until her death in 2016, and then to Patricia Ann O'Brien, from 2019 until his death. He had four children, including actress Finn Carter.

On May 11, 2023, Carter died at a retirement home in Chapel Hill, North Carolina, at age 88, following a series of strokes.

Government offices
Preceded by John Reinhardt	Assistant Secretary of State for Public Affairs; March 25, 1977 – June 30, 1980	Succeeded by William J. Dyess
