= William J. Dyess =

American diplomat

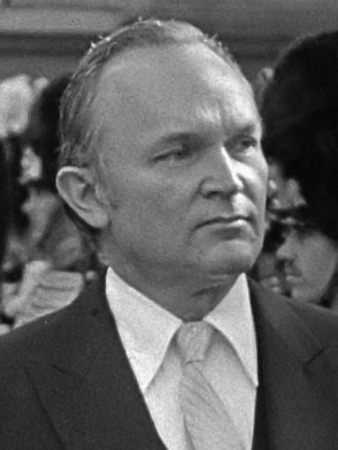

16th Assistant Secretary of State for Public Affairs
- In office August 29, 1980 – July 30, 1981
- Preceded by: Hodding Carter III
- Succeeded by: Dean E. Fischer

8th Spokesperson for the United States Department of State
- In office 1980–1981
- Preceded by: Hodding Carter III
- Succeeded by: Dean E. Fischer

Personal details
- Born: August 1, 1929 Troy, Alabama, U.S.
- Died: January 6, 1996 (aged 66) Washington, D.C., U.S.
- Spouse(s): Mary Elizabeth (nee Awad; separated before death)
- Children: 1
- Education: University of Alabama (BA, MA); University of Oxford; Syracuse University

William Jennings Dyess (August 1, 1929 – January 6, 1996) was an American diplomat who served as Assistant Secretary of State for Public Affairs from 1980 to 1981 and as United States Ambassador to the Netherlands from 1982 to 1983.

William J. Dyess was born in Troy, Alabama on August 1, 1929. He was educated at the University of Alabama, receiving a B.A. in 1950 and an M.A. in international relations in 1951. He then spent the 1951–52 academic year studying at the University of Oxford and 1952–53 at Syracuse University. In 1953, he was drafted and spent 1953 to 1956 serving in the United States Army. He returned to Syracuse University for 1956–57.

In 1958, Dyess joined the United States Foreign Service. He initially worked as an intelligence research specialist for the Central Intelligence Agency. As a Foreign Service Officer, he was posted to Belgrade, Yugoslavia 1961–63; to Copenhagen 1963–65; to Moscow 1966–68; and to Berlin 1968–70.

Dyess returned to the United States in 1970 as an international research officer at the United States Department of State. He held that job until 1975, when he became executive director of the Bureau of Public Affairs. Two years later he became Deputy Assistant Secretary of State for Public Affairs. In 1980, President of the United States Jimmy Carter named Dyess Assistant Secretary of State for Public Affairs, with Dyess holding this office from August 29, 1980 until July 30, 1981.

In 1982, President Ronald Reagan appointed Dyess United States Ambassador to the Netherlands, and Dyess held that post from September 2, 1982 until July 19, 1983.

Dyess married Mary Elizabeth Awad and together the couple had one son, Chandler Dyess. William and Mary Dyess later separated.

Dyess died of cancer in Washington, D.C., on January 6, 1996.

Government offices
Preceded by Hodding Carter III	Assistant Secretary of State for Public Affairs; August 29, 1980 – July 30, 1981	Succeeded by Dean E. Fischer
Diplomatic posts
Preceded by Geri M. Joseph	United States Ambassador to the Netherlands; September 2, 1982 – July 19, 1983	Succeeded by L. Paul Bremer
