= Roscoe Drummond =

American journalist (1902–1983)

- Born: James Roscoe Drummond; January 13, 1902; Theresa, New York, U.S.
- Died: September 30, 1983 (aged 81); Princeton, New Jersey, U.S.
- Resting place: Rock Creek Cemetery
- Education: Syracuse University (BS)
- Occupation: Political journalist
- Spouse(s): Charlotte Bruner (m. 1926, died) Carol Cramer
- Children: 1

James Roscoe Drummond (January 13, 1902 – September 30, 1983) was a 20th-century American political journalist, editor, and syndicated Washington columnist, known for his long association with The Christian Science Monitor and 50-year syndicated column "State of the Nation", serving as director of information for the Marshall Plan, and co-founding Freedom House.

== Early life ==
James Roscoe Drummond was born on January 13, 1902, in Theresa, New York, to Georgia Estella (née Peppers) and John Henry Drummond. In 1924, he received a Bachelor of Science in journalism from Syracuse University. At Syracuse, he was editor of the Daily Orange and was a member of Tau Theta Upsilon. He was also a member of Alpha Kappa Psi, Sigma Phi Epsilon, Beta Gamma Sigma and Sigma Delta Chi.

== Career ==
On the same day he received his degree in 1924, Drummond joined the staff of The Christian Science Monitor in Boston. He worked as a reporter, assistant city editor, assistant to executive editor and chief editorial writer between the years 1924 and 1930. He was European editorial manager (1930–33); general news editor and member of editorial board (1933–34); and executive editor from 1934 to 1940. In 1940 he was named chief of the bureau in Washington, D.C., a position he held until 1953.

Drummond took a leave to serve as European director of information for the Marshall Plan from 1949 to 1951 with the Economic Cooperation Administration in Paris. A founding member of Freedom House in 1941, he was a member of the board of trustees (1962–67) and served as its vice-chair. From 1953 to 1955 he was chief of the Washington bureau of the New York Herald Tribune.

Drummond wrote a political column he wrote for more than 50 years, called "State of the Nation". Syndicated by the Los Angeles Times, the column was carried by 150 newspapers in the U.S. and abroad, and reflected Drummond's Republican point of view. He began writing the column in 1951, succeeding Joseph C. Harsch; he stopped writing the column in 1981 after the automobile accident.

== Personal life ==
Drummond married Charlotte Bruner, daughter of Meylert Bruner, of Newton, Massachusetts, on September 11, 1926. They had a son, Geoffrey. His wife died around 1977. He married Carol around 1978.

In 1981, Drummond was injured in an automotive accident. He died of a heart ailment on September 30, 1983, at the Tenacre Foundation, a Christian Science nursing home in Princeton, New Jersey. He was buried in Rock Creek Cemetery.

== Works ==
He was co-author (with Gaston Coblentz) of Duel at the Brink (1960), a book about Secretary of State John Foster Dulles. Drummond was writing his memoirs at the time of his death.
