= Darren Beattie =

American author and diplomat

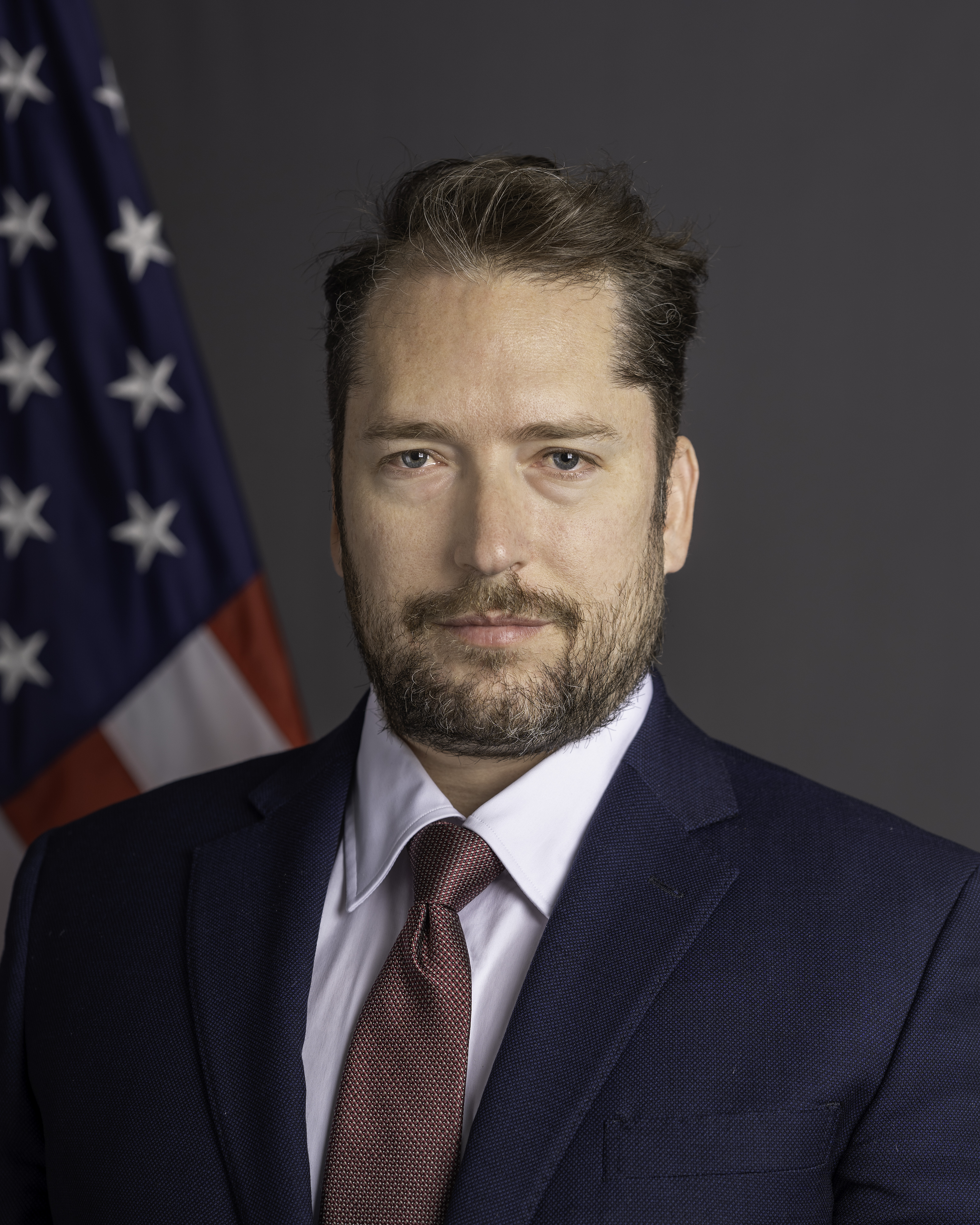
- Official portrait, 2025

Acting Under Secretary of State for Public Diplomacy and Public Affairs
- In office February 4, 2025 – October 10, 2025
- President: Donald Trump
- Preceded by: Lee Satterfield (Acting)
- Succeeded by: Sarah B. Rogers

Acting Assistant Secretary of State for Educational and Cultural Affairs
- In office February 4, 2025 – May 18, 2026
- Preceded by: Scott Weinhold (acting)
- Succeeded by: Cate Dillon

Personal details
- Born: Darren Jeffrey Beattie
- Party: Republican
- Spouse: Yulia Kirillova (m. 2021)
- Education: University of Chicago (BS); Duke University (PhD)

Darren Jeffrey Beattie is an American conservative author and diplomat who served as a Senior Bureau Official at the Bureau of Educational and Cultural Affairs. He was previously acting Assistant Secretary of State for Educational and Cultural Affairs from February to October 2025.

Beattie was a visiting professor at Duke University and served as a speechwriter in the White House during the first Trump administration until 2018, when his participation in a 2016 conference featuring white nationalist speakers resurfaced. He was later appointed to the U.S. Commission for the Preservation of America's Heritage Abroad. He is the founder of the news website Revolver News.

== Biography ==
Beattie holds a BS in mathematics from the University of Chicago and a PhD (2016) in political theory from Duke University, completing his dissertation on "Martin Heidegger's Mathematical Dialectic" under the supervision of Michael Allen Gillespie. Beattie wrote a biweekly column for the Duke Chronicle from 2011 to 2012, returning in 2017 to write an article condemning Duke's signature of a letter expressing opposition to Trump's Muslim ban. He was a visiting professor of political science at Duke University from 2016 to 2017. He also taught at Humboldt University of Berlin.

In 2016, Beattie was a part of a group of academics who signed a petition in support of Donald Trump's presidential campaign. In November 2016, he predicted that Trump would win the 2016 presidential election.

During Trump's first term, Beattie worked as a policy aide and speechwriter in the White House. CNN reported in 2018 that Beattie had attended a 2016 meeting of the HL Mencken Club conference that was also attended by white nationalists such as Peter Brimelow, John Derbyshire, and Robert Weissberg. Although Beattie responded that he only gave an academic speech at the conference and made no offensive remarks, he was fired.

In April 2019, U.S. representative Matt Gaetz hired Beattie as his special advisor for speechwriting.

In November 2020, Trump appointed Beattie as a member of the U.S. Commission for the Preservation of America's Heritage Abroad. Numerous organizations, including those representing the Jewish community, objected to the appointment. In January 2022, the Biden administration forced Beattie to resign from the position.

Beattie founded Revolver News, which raised funds in part by selling pro-Trump apparel and merchandise. Beattie once wrote there that Federal Bureau of Investigation (FBI) agents were behind the January 6 United States Capitol attack.

In 2021, Beattie married Yulia Kirillova (who is Russian), according to The Telegraph in June 2025, which also reported that Kirillova is the niece of Sergei Chernikov, a Russian millionaire politician whom Vladimir Putin allegedly thanked for assisting in Putin's rise to power. Three months later, in September 2025, The Telegraph published a formal apology to Chernikov, retracting multiple assertions made in its June 2025 article and stating neither Chernikov nor Kirillova has any association with the Kremlin or Putin.

Beattie joined the United States Department of State under the second Trump administration in January 2025. On February 4, 2025, he was appointed acting Under Secretary of State for Public Diplomacy and Public Affairs. On March 11, Beattie issued a document among the Counter Foreign Information Manipulation and Interference Hub staff that requested staff emails and other records with or about a host of individuals and organizations that track or write about foreign disinformation, or have criticized Trump and his allies. It also requested all staff communications that have mentioned Trump or people connected to him such as Alex Jones, Glenn Greenwald, and Robert F. Kennedy Jr., as well as mentions of a list of keywords, including "Pepe the Frog", "incel", "QAnon", "Black Lives Matter", "great replacement theory", "far-right", and "infodemic". Beattie told State Department officials that his goal was a release of internal State Department documents similar to the Twitter Files "to rebuild trust with the American public".

In April 2025, the Trump administration shut down its Counter Foreign Information Manipulation and Interference office (R/FIMI), which had aimed to tackle foreign disinformation, including from China, Iran, and Russia. Secretary of State Marco Rubio told the media that Beattie had spearheaded the shutdown.

In July 2025, Beattie was appointed acting president of the United States Institute of Peace. In November of that year he was named as a senior advisor in the Department of State's Bureau of Western Hemisphere Affairs.

On February 2026, Beattie was named to a senior role concerning US-Brazil relations. Beattie is a critic of Brazil's government. In mid-March he requested and received a visa to travel to Brazil to attend a forum on critical minerals. His visa was revoked after he also requested a meeting with Jair Bolsonaro, the Brazilian ex-president imprisoned for an attempted coup. Brazilian President Lula da Silva said Beattie's visa could be reinstated if Brazil's health minister's US visa was also reinstated.

== Views ==
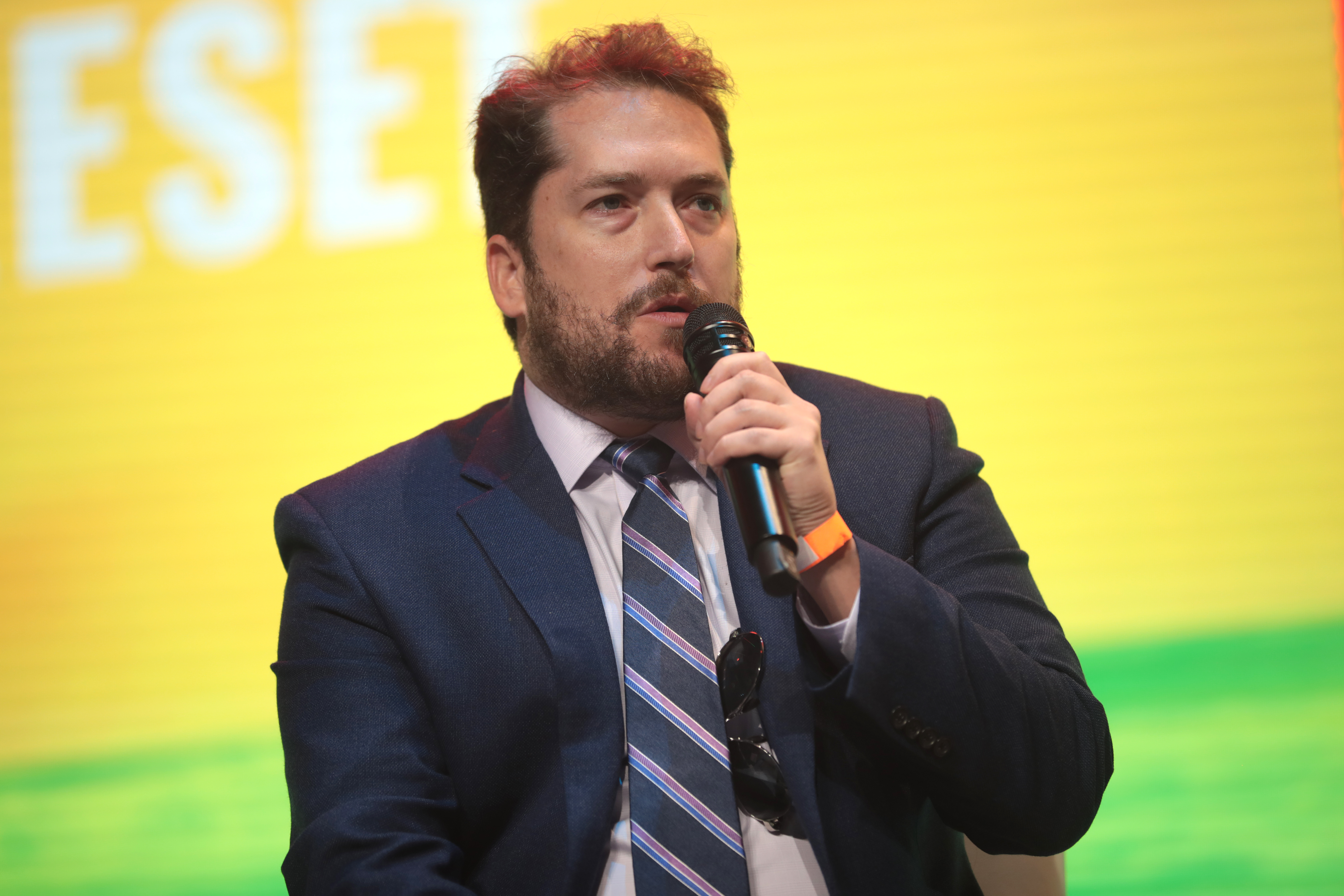
Beattie speaking with attendees at the 2020 Student Action Summit hosted by Turning Point USA in Florida

Beattie has been described as a staunch ally of Donald Trump. He is active on Twitter, where his comments have attracted controversy.

Beattie initially praised the January 6 United States Capitol attack on Twitter, but he later deleted the tweets. As early as October 2021, he promoted the conspiracy theory that Ray Epps was a federal agent provocateur, which he still endorsed as of August 2024. In September 2024, Beattie suggested the U.S. Intelligence Community was more likely than Iran to be behind the assassination attempts on Trump.

In October 2024, Beattie tweeted, "Competent white men must be in charge if you want things to work. Unfortunately, our entire national ideology is predicated on coddling the feelings of women and minorities, and demoralizing competent white men." The Atlantic has described Beattie's views as white nationalist.

Beattie has called for the sterilization of what he called "low-IQ trash".

=== Foreign affairs ===
Beattie has strongly criticized U.S. foreign policy on Twitter and in longer-form writings. In a widely circulated 2020 essay on Revolver News, he compared U.S. involvement in post-Soviet color revolutions to "the coordinated efforts of government bureaucrats, NGOs, and the media to oust President Trump".

Also in 2020, he tweeted: "NATO is a greater threat to American liberty than the Chinese Communist Party. Sounds crazy I know, but I'd be willing to debate anyone serious on this topic publicly." In 2021, he wrote that "a big part of American ruling class' hatred of Russia is that Russia is a major power that rejects the woke ideology at the core of American regime" and "Now that Xi's China is rejecting America's woke poison in key respects, interesting to see how this plays into cold war 2.0." Beattie also frequently praised the judicial system of China for being repressive, and said the U.S. and other Western countries should become more repressive to combat crime.

Beattie has called Vladimir Putin "brave and strong", saying that Putin has "done more to advance conservative positions in the US than any Republican" and opining in 2021 that "just about every Western institution would improve in quality if it were directly infiltrated and controlled by Putin".

Of the Chinese government's policies toward Uyghurs, Beattie wrote: "The Chinese aren't genocidal. They just object to Uyghur supremacy and uyghurness. If Uyghurs simply reject uyghur supremacy, they'll have no problem functioning in Chinese society." In 2021, he wrote, "Uighurs don't like anti-Uighur racism, it must be because they are Uighur nationalists who think all of China is for Uighurs ONLY." In May 2024, he wrote, "Taiwan will inevitably belong to China, it's only a matter of time. It's not worth expending any capital to prevent", adding that a "visionary statesman will recognize this and make a deal- in exchange for acknowledgment of this basic reality, get some serious concessions on Africa and Antartica [sic]". In July 2024, Beattie wrote it "might mean fewer drag queen parades in Taiwan, but otherwise not the end of the world" if China took over Taiwan.

In August 2024, he wrote the "ruling regime" of the United Kingdom, referring to the Labour Party that took power in the 2024 general election, "is far less legitimate than Saddam was in Iraq prior to the US invasion—and, for that matter, far less legitimate than Maduro's regime in Venezuela". He also wrote that month that "Britain treats its own native white people far worse than China treats its muslim Uighur population" and that "America treats rural whites far worse than China treats Uighurs." Beattie suggested that the UK would be better off under Chinese rule, and later wrote "the UK is infinitely more repulsive than China".

In December 2025, he received German AfD parliamentarians Markus Frohnmaier and Jan Wenzel Schmidt.

In March 2026, Brazil revoked Beattie's visa following an attempt to visit former president Jair Bolsonaro in prison.

== Personal life ==
Beattie is Jewish. Beattie's wife, Yulia Kirillova, who Beattie married in 2021, is the niece of Russian drinks magnate Sergei Cherniko.
