= Heather Nauert =

American government official and journalist (born 1970)

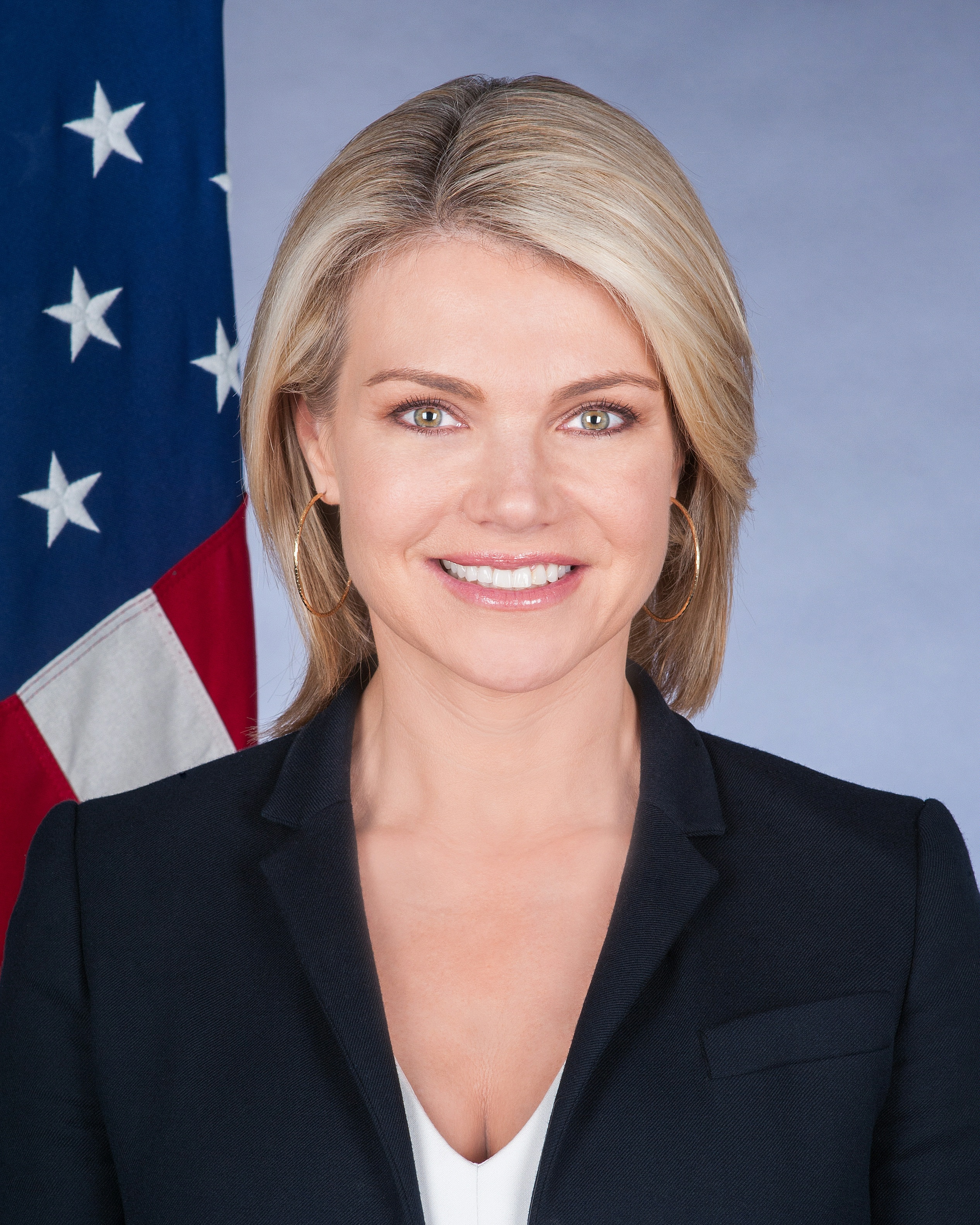
- Official portrait, 2017

Under Secretary of State for Public Diplomacy and Public Affairs
- Acting
- In office March 13, 2018 – October 10, 2018
- President: Donald Trump
- Preceded by: Steve Goldstein
- Succeeded by: Michelle Giuda (acting)

27th Spokesperson for the United States Department of State
- In office April 24, 2017 – April 3, 2019
- President: Donald Trump
- Preceded by: John Kirby
- Succeeded by: Morgan Ortagus

Personal details
- Born: Heather Ann Nauert; January 27, 1970 (age 56) Rockford, Illinois, U.S.
- Party: Republican
- Spouse: Scott Norby (m. 2000)
- Children: 2
- Education: Pine Manor College (attended); Arizona State University, Tempe (attended); Mount Vernon Seminary and College (BA); Columbia University (MA)
- Nauert's voice Nauert on National Human Trafficking Prevention Month. Recorded January 4, 2018

Heather Anne Nauert (born January 27, 1970) is an American broadcast journalist and former government official who served as Spokesperson for the United States Department of State in the Donald Trump administration from 2017 to 2019. Nauert also served as Acting Under Secretary of State for Public Diplomacy and Public Affairs from March 2018 to April 2019.

Prior to her positions at the Department of State, she had a nearly 20-year career in broadcast journalism. Nauert worked as a news anchor and correspondent at Fox News Channel, including the news program Fox & Friends, and as a news anchor and correspondent for ABC News.

== Early life ==
Nauert is a native of Rockford, Illinois, and spent much of her childhood in Wisconsin. Her father, Peter Nauert, was an executive in the insurance industry. She has three brothers: Justin, Jonathan, and Joseph.

Nauert attended Keith Country Day School in Rockford, Illinois. After landing an internship hosting a country music video program in Washington, D.C., she stayed there to finish school, earning her Bachelor of Arts degree in communications from Mount Vernon College for Women. She received her master's degree in journalism from Columbia University.

== Background ==
In March 2018, the AP wrote about Nauert's "meteoric rise" in the State Department. "U.N. Ambassador Nikki Haley and Nauert are among the few women in the Trump administration with high-profile voices on foreign policy. Only three State Department officials – all men – now outrank Nauert."

While at the State Department, Nauert conducted press briefings and oversaw communications and public diplomacy for the 75,000-person department. She reported directly to two secretaries of state, Rex Tillerson and Mike Pompeo, and traveled extensively, including to North Korea to participate in denuclearization talks and bring home three American hostages held by the regime.

She also served on the board of the U.S. Agency for Global Media, formerly known as the Broadcasting Board of Governors, which administers U.S. taxpayer-funded television and radio networks, including Voice of America, Radio Free Europe/Asia, Radio Free Liberty, Cuba Broadcasting and Middle East Broadcasting Networks.

After leaving public office, Nauert joined several boards for leading national security and international relations organizations. In 2019, Trump appointed Nauert to the J. William Fulbright Foreign Scholarship Board and the President's Commission on White House Fellowships.

Nauert serves on the Board of the U.S. Global Leadership Coalition, which advocates for strong U.S. foreign policy, as well as U.S. issues overseas. In 2023, she joined USGLC's newly launched Conservative Foreign Policy Study Group alongside over 60 conservative foreign policy and national security leaders.

In 2020, Nauert joined the Board of Advisors for the Center for New American Security, an independent, bipartisan nonprofit that conducts research and develops pragmatic and principled defense and national security policies. The Board includes leaders from the military, government, private sector, and academia. She was a Senior Fellow at the Hudson Institute, a conservative think tank, until 2021.

In 2020, Nauert joined the advisory board of BGR Group, a government relations and public affairs firm in Washington, D.C. She also serves as a senior advisor to corporations, think tanks, and foundations. Nauert advises Fortune 500 companies, reporting to CEOs and boards of directors, providing leaders with strategic communications guidance, including developing and leading media campaigns to achieve clients' unique goals.

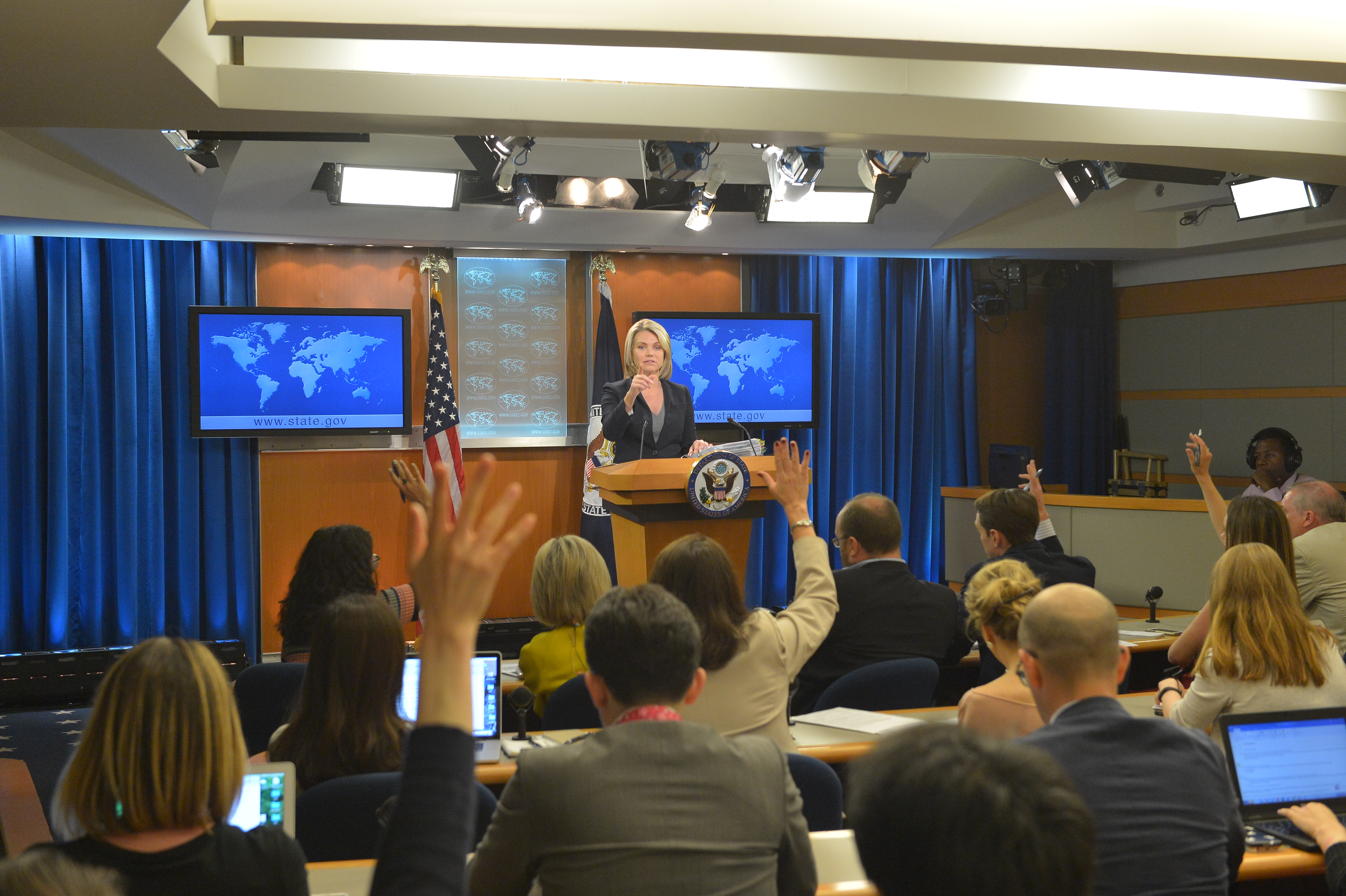
Nauert addressing reporters at a State Department press briefing.

Since 2021, Nauert has served on the National Advisory Board of Warriors in Quiet Waters, a Montana-based veterans service organization that empowers post-911 combat veterans to thrive and live purpose-driven lives.

Nauert consults corporate and non-profit clients. In 2023, she joined the Federal Advisory Board of Armis, a cybersecurity firm. She is a contributor to the British TV network, ITV News, where she provided analysis of the 2024 election.

== Career ==
=== Broadcast journalism ===
Before serving in government, Nauert spent nearly 20 years as a news anchor and correspondent at Fox News and ABC News, where she covered the September 11 terror attacks, Operation Iraqi Freedom, and genocide in Darfur, Sudan.

Nauert covered four U.S. presidential elections, Republican and Democratic conventions, a presidential inauguration, and the 2008 financial crisis. She also anchored the coverage of the terrorist attacks in Boston, Orlando, and San Bernardino.

In 1996, Nauert was a reporter for the syndicated business program First Business. She worked for Fox News from 1998 to 2005, first as a contributor for three years and then as a correspondent for four years. During her time as a correspondent, she regularly contributed to The Big Story, where she ultimately became co-anchor in 2007.

She departed Fox News and joined ABC News from 2005 to 2007, where she worked as a general assignment correspondent, contributing to ABC World News Tonight, Good Morning America, and Nightline.

While at ABC, she was nominated for an Emmy Award for her in-depth piece on teenage girls in Iraq during the war on the special series 13 Around the World. In 2007, Nauert returned to Fox News as co-host with John Gibson of the weekday edition of The Big Story until it was canceled in 2008.

Nauert also co-anchored the newscasts Good Day Early Call and Good Day New York Wake Up with co-anchor Steve Lacy weekday mornings for Fox Broadcasting Company owned-and-operated station WNYW in New York City. In October 2012, Nauert left Good Day Wake Up to rejoin Fox News Channel full time as an anchor and breaking news reporter. She appeared regularly on Fox & Friends. According to the Washington Post, Nauert "broadcast just about every right-wing talking-point under the sun" when she was a presenter on Fox News. She referred to illegal immigrant students as "illegals" and cited CDC studies that immigrant children were bringing disease like tuberculosis.

She has appeared on two fictional TV shows in which she played herself: 24 (3 episodes, 2010) and Brother's Keeper (1 episode, 1999).

==== Reporter in Iraq ====
While working as a reporter for Fox News and ABC News, Nauert traveled to Baghdad, Fallujah, Irbil, and Jordan, where she covered the beginning of the Iraq War, the insurgency, and the reconstruction. She also covered Saddam Hussein's trial and death, the first free election, and the everyday life of Iraqi civilians, including young girls living in an orphanage.

More than 4,400 Americans were killed and 32,000 wounded in the War. Nauert said, "The impact of this war on service members, their families and our nation is still apparent – and even raw – today."

Speaking about her various reporting assignments in 2004, 2006, and 2007, Nauert said, "Each reporting stint was about six weeks and required a lot of pre-preparation. I'll never forget the look my dad gave me when I told him I volunteered to spend Christmas in Iraq during a particularly unnerving time. To me, it was an honor and the least I could do."

While reporting on the conflicts, Nauert provided viewers with hourly or daily updates. She later said on Instagram, "At the time, this was the most significant story in the world, with every major news organization sending teams and more than 30 coalition partners (countries working together) sending troops."

==== September 11 Attacks ====
Nauert covered the 9/11 terror attacks from New York City while working as a correspondent for the Fox News Channel. Her account was documented in the book "At Ground Zero: 25 Stories from Young Reporters Who Were There."

=== United States Department of State ===
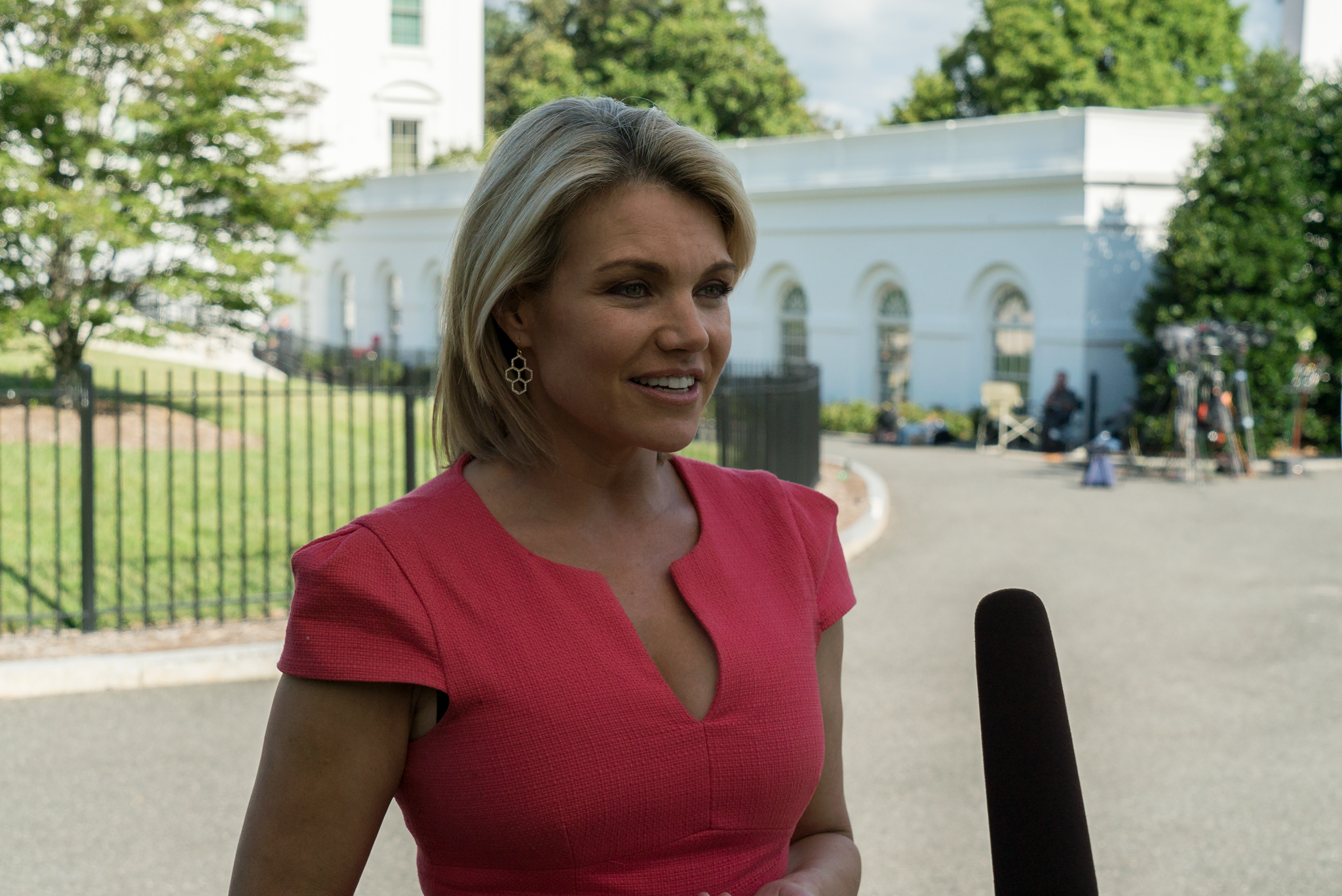
Nauert at the White House on July 25, 2017

On April 24, 2017, the United States Department of State announced that Nauert would be the new State Department spokesperson, her first role in government. She held her first press briefing in that role five weeks later, on June 6, 2017, and frequently appeared on TV.

Following the dismissal of Steve Goldstein on March 13, 2018, Nauert was named acting Under Secretary of State for Public Diplomacy and Public Affairs, the fourth ranking position in the State Department. In that role, she oversaw a budget of $1.2 billion and almost 1,000 employees. She was the Department's highest-ranking woman while simultaneously serving as Department Spokesperson.

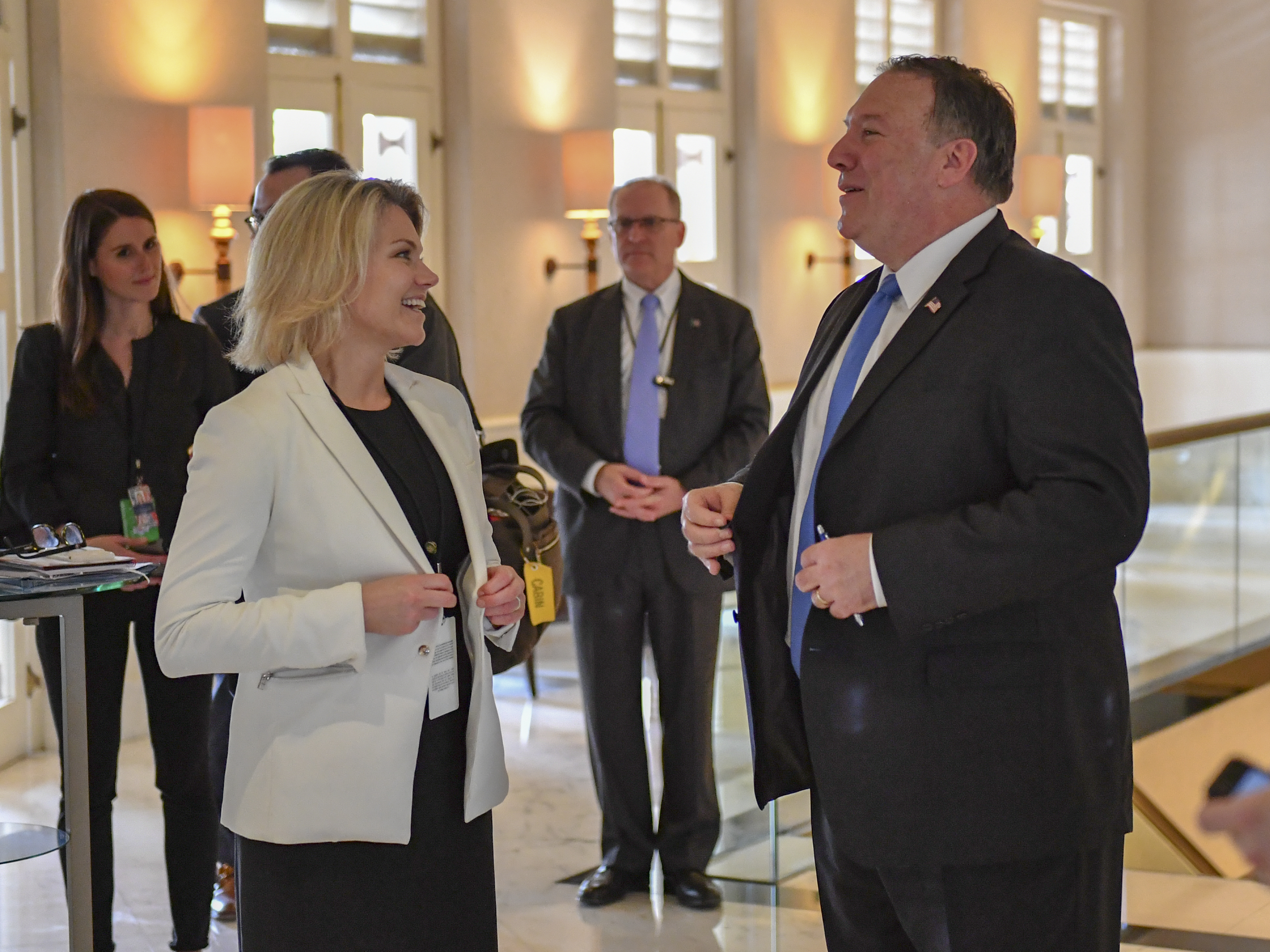
Heather Nauert chatting with Secretary Pompeo at the Singapore Summit in 2018.

During her time in the State Department, Nauert did not develop a close relationship with Secretary of State Rex Tillerson, but after Tillerson's dismissal, she became part of Mike Pompeo's inner circle when he took over as Secretary of State.

In these roles, Nauert communicated U.S. foreign policy and formulated the public messaging for the 75,000-person State Department and nearly 300 U.S. embassies and consulates worldwide. She helped plan, execute, and manage the messaging of all overseas trips led by Secretary of State Mike Pompeo.

She also helped facilitate the messaging on top department initiatives, such as initiating the maximum pressure sanctions campaign against North Korea, holding China accountable for actions in the South China Sea, and combating state-sponsored disinformation from Russia, China, and Iran.

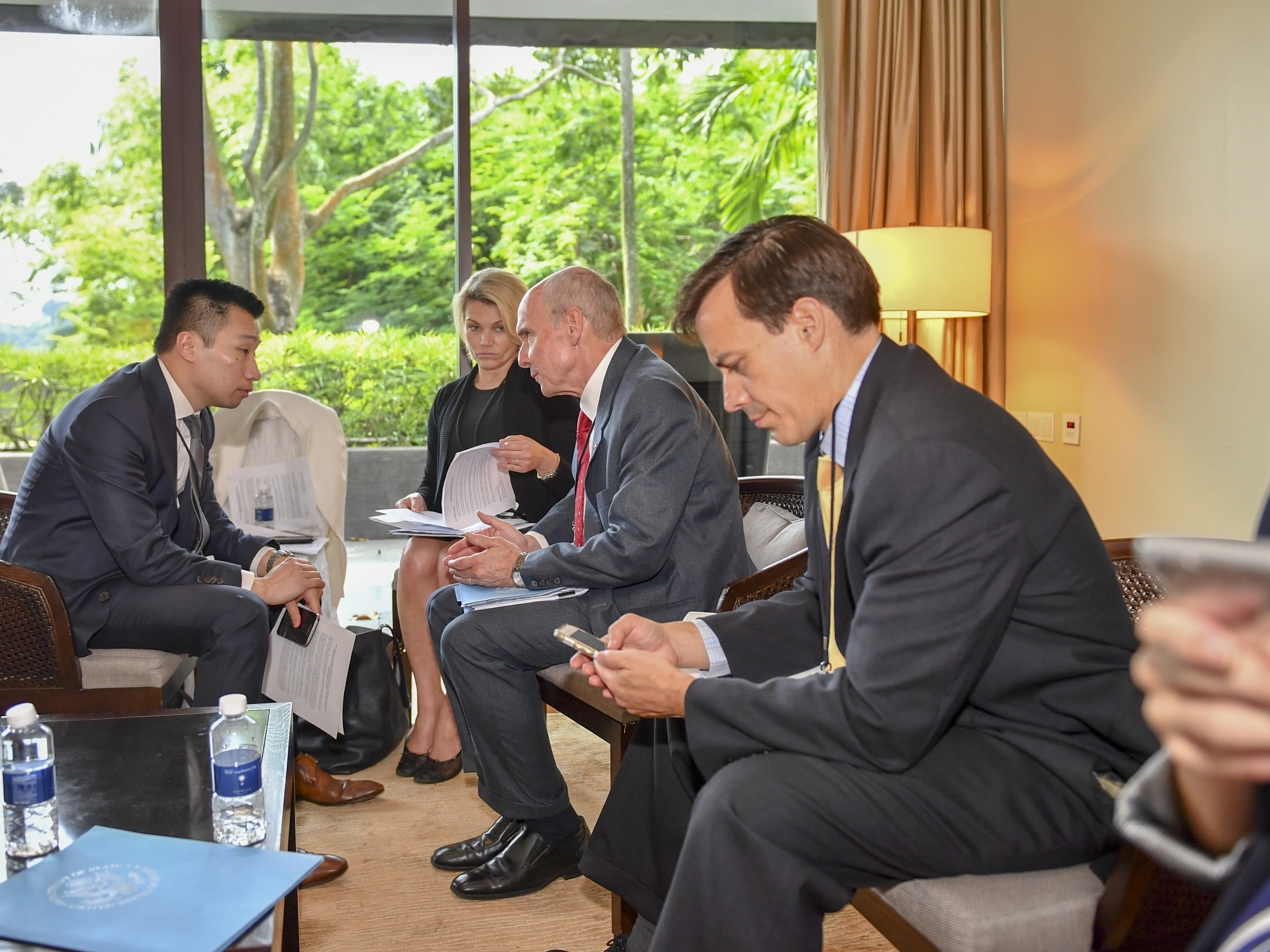
Acting Under Secretary Nauert Working Behind-the-Scenes at the Singapore Summit

In May 2018, Nauert was part of a small team who went with Secretary of State Mike Pompeo on a secret mission to bring three Americans home from North Korea. She provided strategic counsel to Secretary Pompeo during his high-stakes meetings with North Korean officials, as they met to plan the landmark summit between President Trump and Kim Jong Un, which took place in June 2018.

At the end of Secretary Pompeo's 13-hour meetings with North Korea officials, including an hour and a half meeting with Kim Jong Un, North Korea agreed to release three Americans who were wrongfully detained in a Pyongyang prison. As The Washington Post reported, this monumental decision "set the stage for a landmark summit between President Trump and Kim Jong Un."

To ensure their safe return to the United States, President Trump announced the news as the Americans took off on a government plane from Pyongyang.

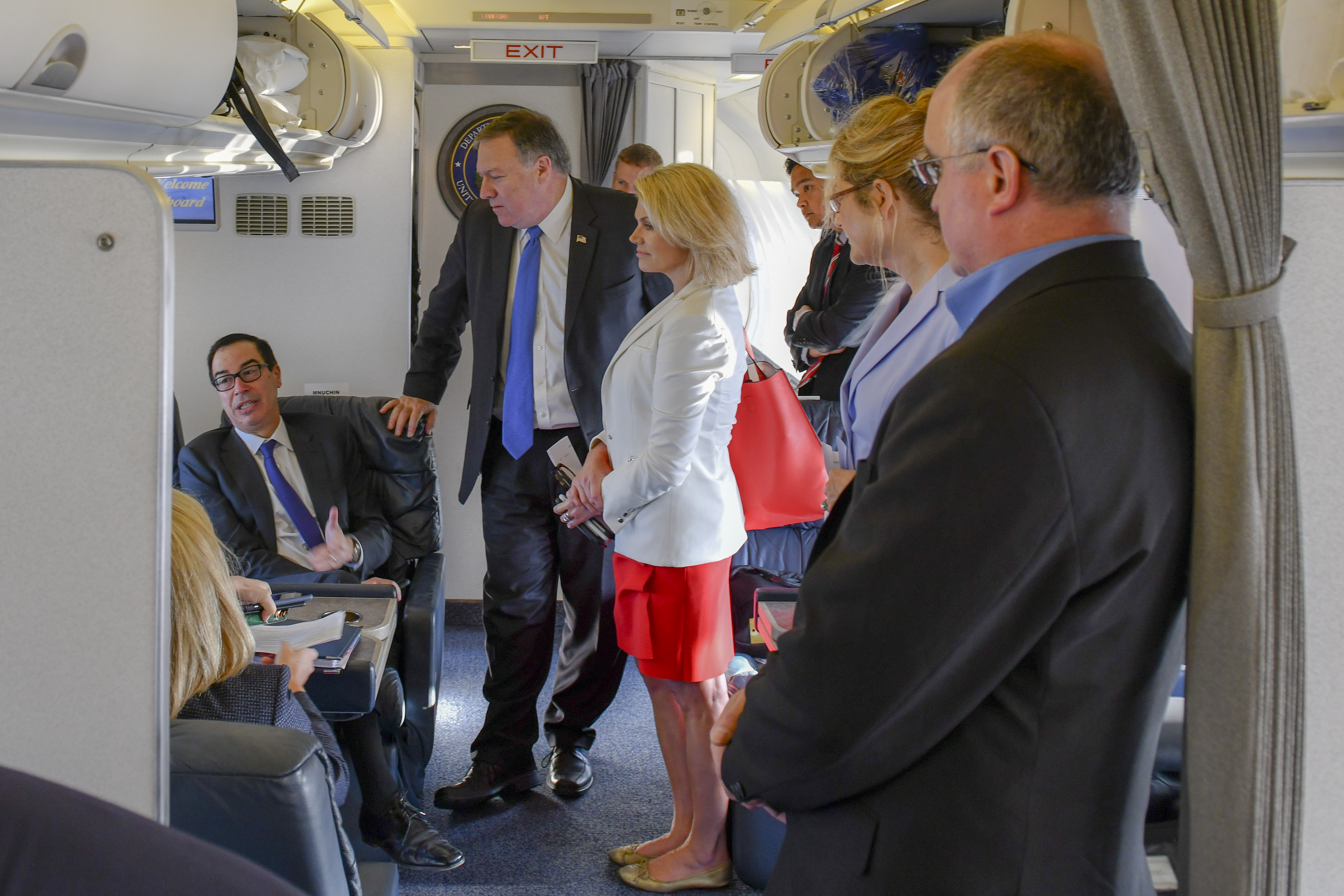
Heather Nauert meeting with Secretary Pompeo and other top administration officials before leaving Mexico

Nauert voiced opposition to the Iraqi Kurdistan's decision to hold an independence referendum in September 2017.

When the United States withdrew from Unesco, Nauert was quoted by The New York Times as saying, "We were in arrears to the tune of $550 million or so, and so the question is, do we want to pay that money? With this anti-Israel bias that's long documented on the part of Unesco, that needs to come to an end."

In April 2018, Nauert voiced support for Saudi Arabian-led intervention in Yemen. She also condemned "Iran's malign influence" in Yemen. In May 2018, Nauert said in response to the Gaza border protests: "We oppose actions against Israel at the International Criminal Court (...) because it does not help the cause for peace."

Nauert called for the release of Ukrainian political prisoners in Russia such as Oleg Sentsov, Stanislav Klykh, Oleksandr Shumkov and Volodymyr Balukh. In a State Department statement, Nauert said: "The United States is deeply concerned by the growing number of individuals—now more than 150—identified by credible human rights organizations as political and religious prisoners held by the government of the Russian Federation.... We call on Russia to release all those identified as political or religious prisoners immediately and cease its use of the legal system to suppress dissent and peaceful religious practice. The Russian people, like people everywhere, deserve equal treatment under the law and the ability to exercise their rights without fear of retribution."

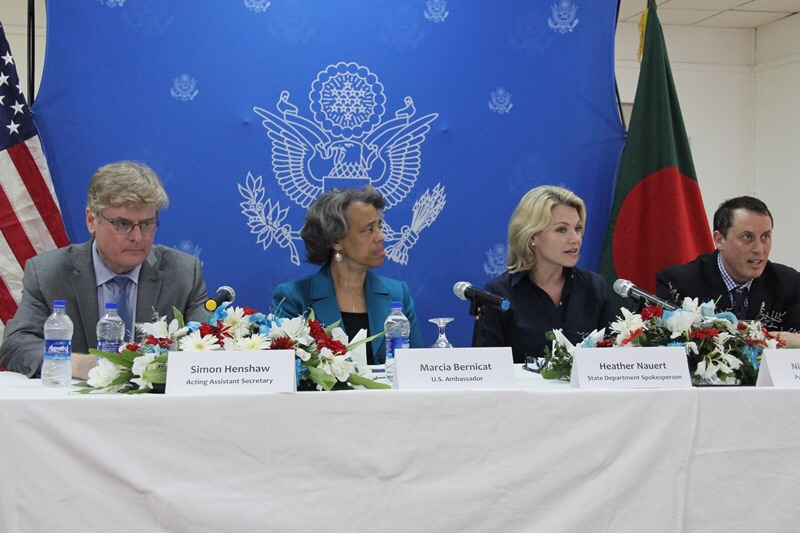
Heather Nauert Speaking at a Press Conference in Bangladesh

Nauert condemned the genocide of the Rohingya Muslim minority in Myanmar, saying: "We will continue to hold those responsible accountable." In 2017, she joined Secretary Tillerson for meetings with State Counsellor Aung San Suu Kyi in Nay Pyi Taw. Soon after his visit, the State Department declared Myanmar's actions against the Rohingya as "ethnic cleansing." In neighboring Bangladesh, Nauert toured Cox's Bazar, the world's largest refugee camp where she met with Rohingya refugees and aid groups.

In August 2018, Canada called for the immediate release of Saudi human rights activist Raif Badawi and his sister, Samar Badawi. In response to Canada's criticism, Saudi Arabia expelled the Ambassador of Canada and froze trade with Canada, leading to a decline in Canada–Saudi Arabia relations. Nauert said: "It is up for the Government of Saudi Arabia and the Canadians to work this out. Both sides need to diplomatically resolve this together. We cannot do it for them."

Nauert criticized China's re-education camps and human rights violations against ethnic Uyghurs and other predominantly Muslim ethnic minorities in China's north-western province of Xinjiang. She said that "credible reports indicate that individuals sent by Chinese authorities to detention centers since April 2017 number at least in the hundreds of thousands, and possibly millions."

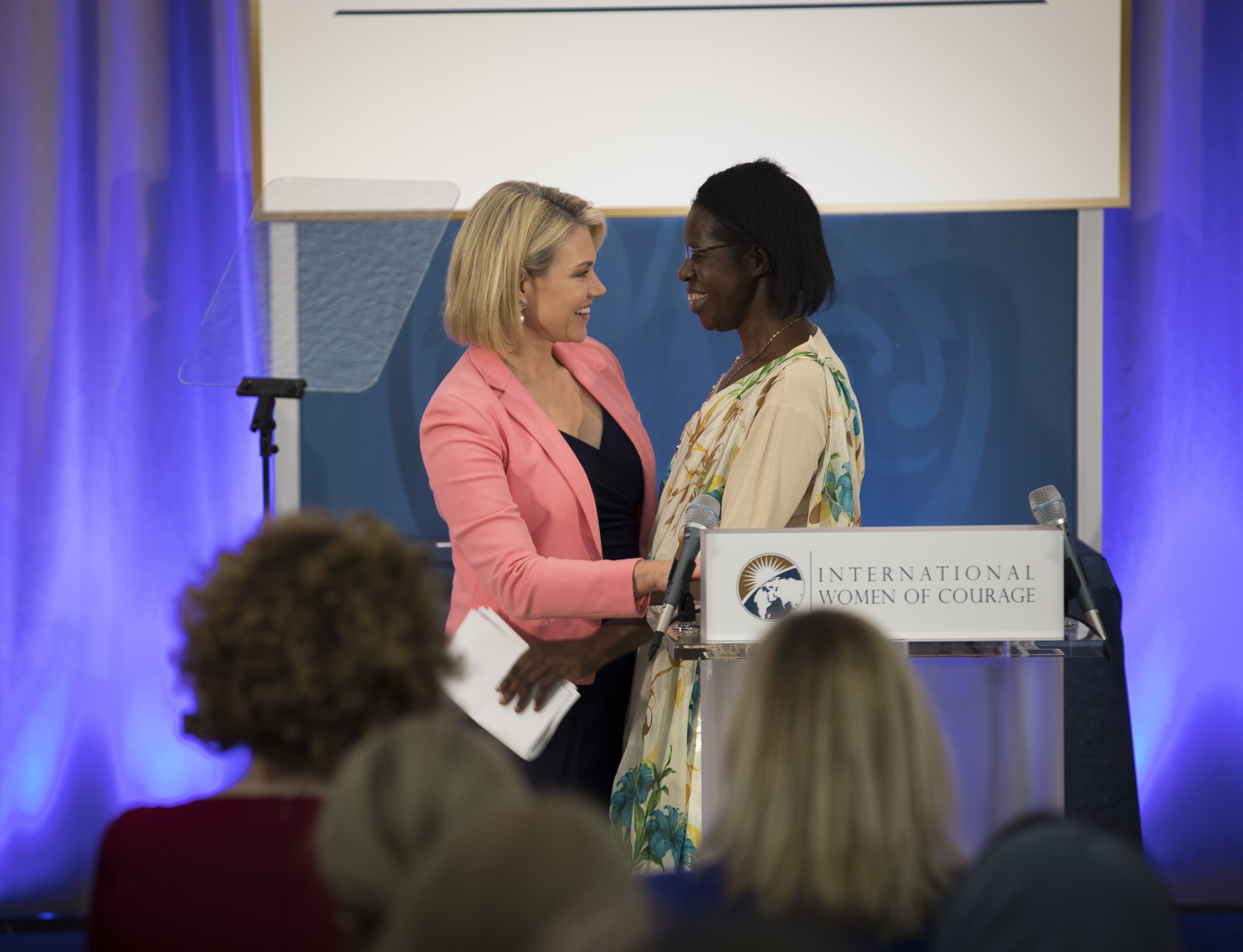
Heather Nauert hosted the annual International Women of Courage (IWOC) Awards at the U.S. State Department on March 23, 2018.

In February 2019, it was reported that she did not intend to return to work as State Department spokeswoman following her withdrawal from consideration as U.N. ambassador.

==== Energy Independence ====
In her roles at the State Department, Nauert advocated for the Department to promote Liquified Natural Gas (LNG) as an important component of national security and international relations. In 2017, the State Department announced the delivery of the first LNG delivery to Poland.

In a State Department statement, Nauert said: "The United States welcomes the arrival of the first U.S. liquefied natural gas (LNG) shipment to Central Europe, which arrived in Poland on June 7. U.S. LNG exports support American jobs, lower energy prices for our partners abroad, and contribute to Europe's energy security goals using a reliable, market based supplier."

Nauert said, "The Department of State has worked closely with European partners to diversify European energy supplies through new sources of natural gas, vital interconnectors and new facilities to import LNG. The United States congratulates Poland on this significant step to diversify its own sources of energy and to strengthen Europe's energy security."

Nauert continues to promote LNG as vital for American allies' national security.

=== Proposed nomination as United States Ambassador to the United Nations ===
On December 7, 2018, Trump announced that he would nominate Nauert to be United States Ambassador to the United Nations. He told reporters that Nauert was "excellent," adding, "She's been a supporter for a long time." News outlets noted that she had risen rapidly through the ranks of the State Department and that she had little official foreign policy experience, though in her time as a reporter she had covered numerous international conflicts and interviewed numerous foreign officials and world leaders. Politico wrote, "Less than two years ago, Heather Nauert was conducting interviews on 'Fox and Friends.' Now, she's preparing to navigate the world's raging geopolitical issues." A Washington Post headline read, "Heather Nauert once cited D-Day in 'long history' of U.S.-German relations. Now she's headed to the U.N."

Despite Trump's announcement, he never nominated Nauert. In filling out paperwork for the appointment, she said that she had employed a nanny who, though she was in the country legally, lacked a proper work visa. Citing family considerations, Nauert withdrew her name from consideration on February 16, 2019. Trump then nominated Ambassador Kelly Craft, who became the 30th United States Ambassador to the United Nations.

=== Veterans ===
In 2021, Nauert joined KBUL News Talk from the Quiet Waters Ranch, the Warriors in Quiet Waters' headquarters, for a radio interview, where she discussed her efforts supporting wounded warriors and those left behind in Afghanistan. They discussed the 20th anniversary of 9/11—Nauert was in NYC during the attacks—and what the organization is doing to support post-9/11 veterans, such as taking them fishing and ice fishing.

=== J. William Fulbright Foreign Scholarship Board ===
On March 29, 2019, President Trump appointed Nauert to serve as a member on the J. William Fulbright Foreign Scholarship Board. The 12-member board meets in Washington, D.C. and is responsible for supervising the Fulbright program.

== International Relations ==
=== Ukraine ===
In 2024, Heather Nauert traveled to Ukraine with UNHCR, the UN Refugee Agency, to see conditions on the ground as the country entered its third year of war following Russia's 2022 invasion. With other former government officials and media, she undertook a 1,300-mile road trip visiting bombed out hospitals and schools and speaking with civilians, aid organizations, military and government officials.

On February 14, 2024, Nauert was interviewed by Greta Van Susteren on Newsmax, where she shared video clips and insights about her 1,300 mile trek through war-torn Ukraine. Nauert also spoke about her trip to war-torn Ukraine on the Vandenberg Coalition Podcast, Vandenberg Flash Focus.

As the debate for aid to war-torn Ukraine dragged on through U.S. Congress, Nauert authored several op-eds about the issues at stake:

- Op-ed published in the New York Post: "As Congress debates aid, Russia is 'kidnapping' Ukrainian kids."
- Op-ed published in The Hill: "America's enemies are sharpening their knives as Congress fights itself."
- Op-ed published in The Hill, "On Ukraine aid, Republicans should follow the leader."

In an interview on Newsmax, Nauert said, "The United States and our partners need to give Ukraine the lethal aid that they are asking for."

In February 2024, she met with Maia Sandu, the President of Moldova. Nauert posted on Instagram about her trip: "Five days in Ukraine with Republican national security colleagues – showing our solid commitment to the Ukrainian people, despite squabbling in Washington. Thank you, President Sandu, for speaking so candidly with us."

=== Hungary ===
In the spring of 2024, Nauert traveled to Hungary to speak at Ludovika University of Public Service about U.S. foreign policy. She joined officials from France, Poland, and Hungary–including Prime Minister Viktor Orbán's senior political team–for a debate.

She highlighted concerning policies as Hungary develops stronger ties with China and Russia. Nauert posted on LinkedIn, "I emphasized the importance of a strong and enduring NATO alliance, with partner countries committing at least 2% of GDP to defense spending. I expressed grave concern about Putin's war in Ukraine and his targeted killing of civilians and kidnapping of Ukrainian children. We also talked about China's attempt to gain influence in foreign countries and I cautioned that its real intent is to spy, steal intellectual property, technology and become the beneficiary of foreign nations' debt."

=== Israel ===
In September 2022, Nauert reported on Hezbollah terror tunnels that the Israel Defense Forces discovered near Israel's border in Lebanon in a piece published in The New York Sun: "Inside a Terrorist Tunnel, Between Lebanon and Israel."

Following the October 7th attacks in Israel, she wrote about the threat Iran and its proxies pose against Israel and America in a piece published in The New York Sun: "Let Kfar Aza Be One of the Places the World Remembers Forever."

=== Poland ===
Nauert joined the Warner Brothers Discovery Journalism Advisory Group in 2021, a group of former journalists advising the company. In October 2022, Nauert was invited by Warner Brothers Discovery Networks to speak on a panel at the Warsaw Security Forum in Poland. They discussed national security, the press, and polarization heading into the 2022 and 2024 U.S. elections.

While she was in Poland in February 2024, Nauert was interviewed by the Polish television station TVN. Expressing support for Ukraine, Nauert said, "I don't go on TV often but when I do – it's because the subject is something I'm passionate about – right now that's Ukraine and conveying my full support for equipping this democratic, freedom-loving country in its fight for survival against the evil Vladimir Putin. Ukrainians are willing to fight this alone and they are only asking NATO allies for military equipment and limited financial assistance to continue their mission to secure their borders and prevent Putin from invading others."

=== Afghanistan ===
She was also involved with Task Force Pineapple, working with a volunteer group of former military and government officials to help vetted Afghanistan allies make their way to safety as the U.S. government fled. Nauert told the Inlander, "I was personally horrified by the thought that we would leave behind people who had served alongside us."

== Personal life ==
Nauert lives in New York.

Political offices
Preceded by John Kirby	Spokesperson for the United States Department of State; 2017–2019	Succeeded by Morgan Ortagus
Preceded by Steve Goldstein	Under Secretary of State for Public Diplomacy and Public Affairs; Acting; 2018	Succeeded by Michelle Giuda; Acting
