= Elizabeth M. Allen =

American political advisor

Liz Allen
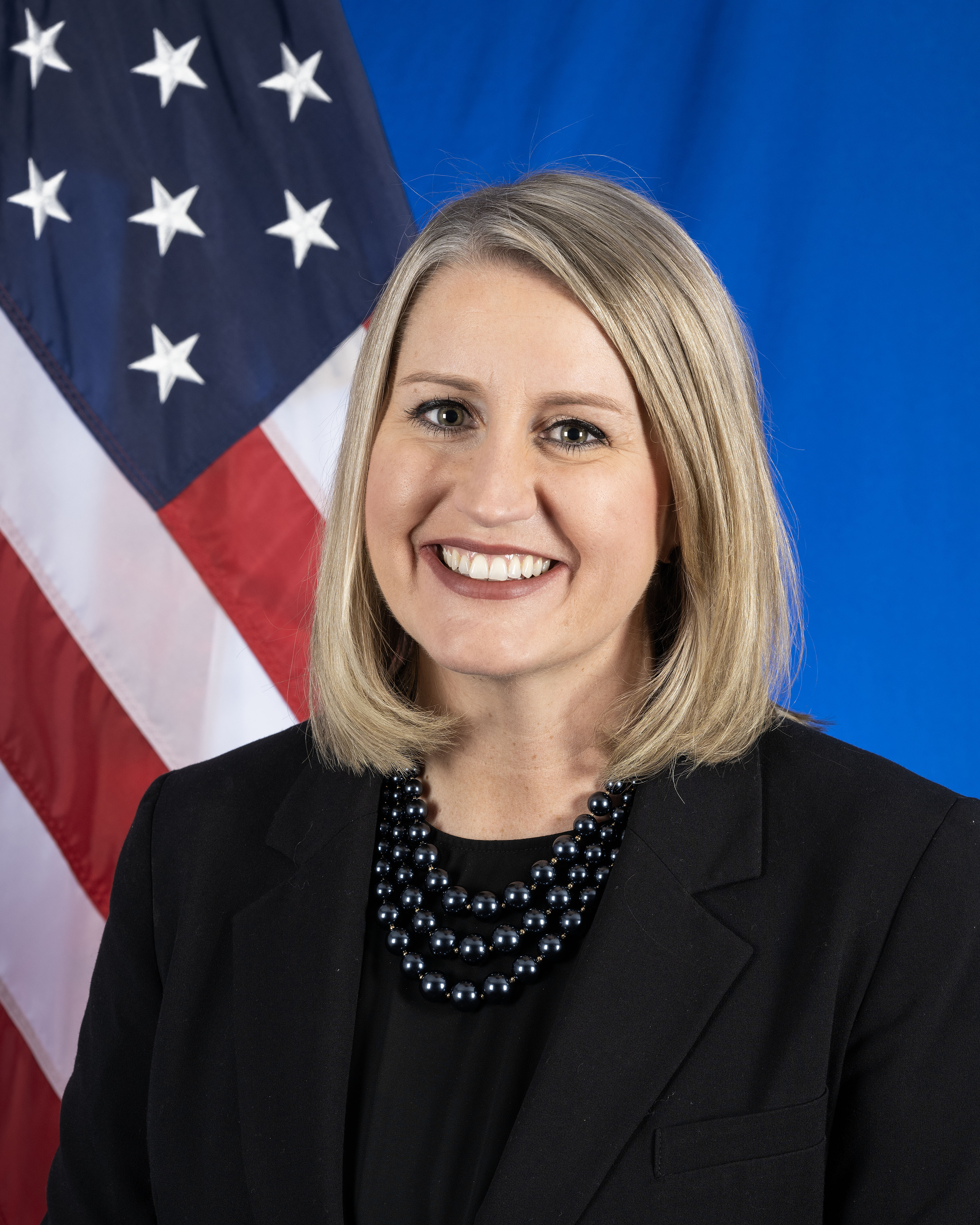
- Official portrait, 2023

10th Under Secretary of State for Public Diplomacy and Public Affairs
- In office June 15, 2023 – August 2, 2024
- President: Joe Biden
- Preceded by: Steve Goldstein (2018)
- Succeeded by: Sarah B. Rogers

3rd Assistant Secretary of State for Global Public Affairs
- In office September 13, 2021 – April 4, 2022
- President: Joe Biden
- Preceded by: Aaron Ringel
- Succeeded by: William M. Russo

Personal details
- Born: Elizabeth Marie Allen Buffalo, New York, U.S.
- Party: Democratic
- Education: State University of New York, Geneseo (BA)

Elizabeth Marie Allen is currently the chief external affairs officer at the NFL Players Association. She has also served as an American political advisor, diplomat, and expert in the information space and modern media environment. She served as under secretary of state for public diplomacy and public affairs in the Biden administration. She had previously served in his administration as assistant secretary of state for global public affairs. She was White House deputy communications director during the Obama administration. Allen resigned from the State Department on August 2, 2024, to take up a role as chief of staff to Tim Walz, the then-unannounced running mate of Democratic presidential candidate and incumbent Vice President Kamala Harris.

== Early life and education ==
Allen is a native of Buffalo, New York. She graduated from Williamsville South High School in Williamsville, New York in 2002. She earned a bachelor of arts degree in political science and sociology from the State University of New York at Geneseo, where she graduated magna cum laude and phi beta kappa.

== Career ==
As an undergraduate, Allen served as an intern at the United States Department of State, where she specialized in human trafficking and international women's issues.

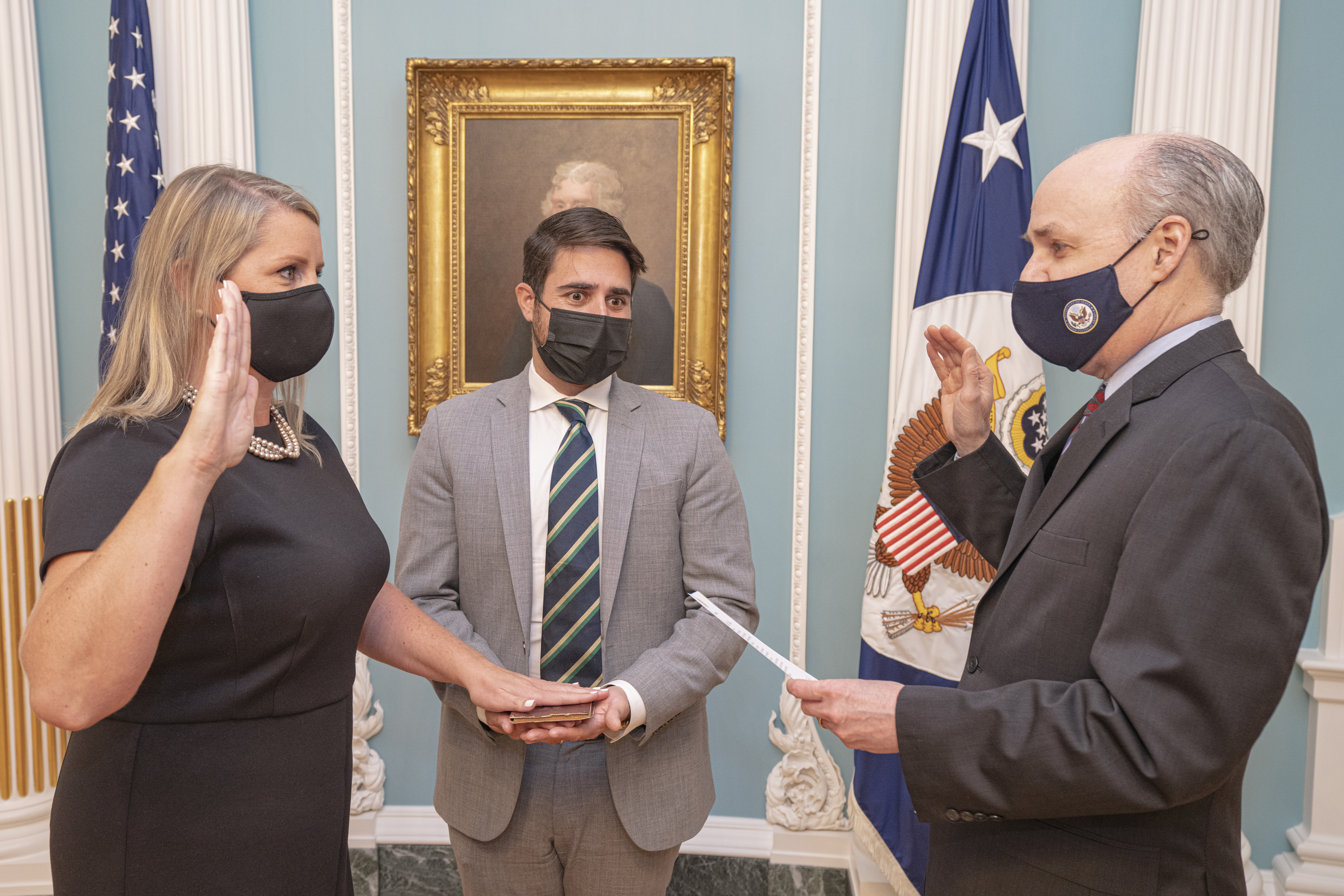
Allen is sworn in as assistant secretary of state for global public affairs, at the U.S. Department of State on September 13, 2021.

After graduating from college, Allen served as the associate director of operations for the 2008 Democratic National Convention. She later joined Barack Obama's 2008 presidential campaign and worked on the 2009 Inauguration.

=== Obama administration ===
From 2009 until 2013, Allen was a member of the communications team for Vice President Joe Biden, and was promoted to serve as deputy director of communications. From 2014 to 2015, she served as the director of public affairs and strategic communication for the U.S. State Department's Bureau of Educational and Cultural Affairs. From 2015 to 2017, Allen served as the White House deputy communications director. While working for Obama, she planned several "first time" presidential events, such as Obama's visit to the Arctic Circle and his meeting with federal inmates in Oklahoma.

=== Biden administration ===
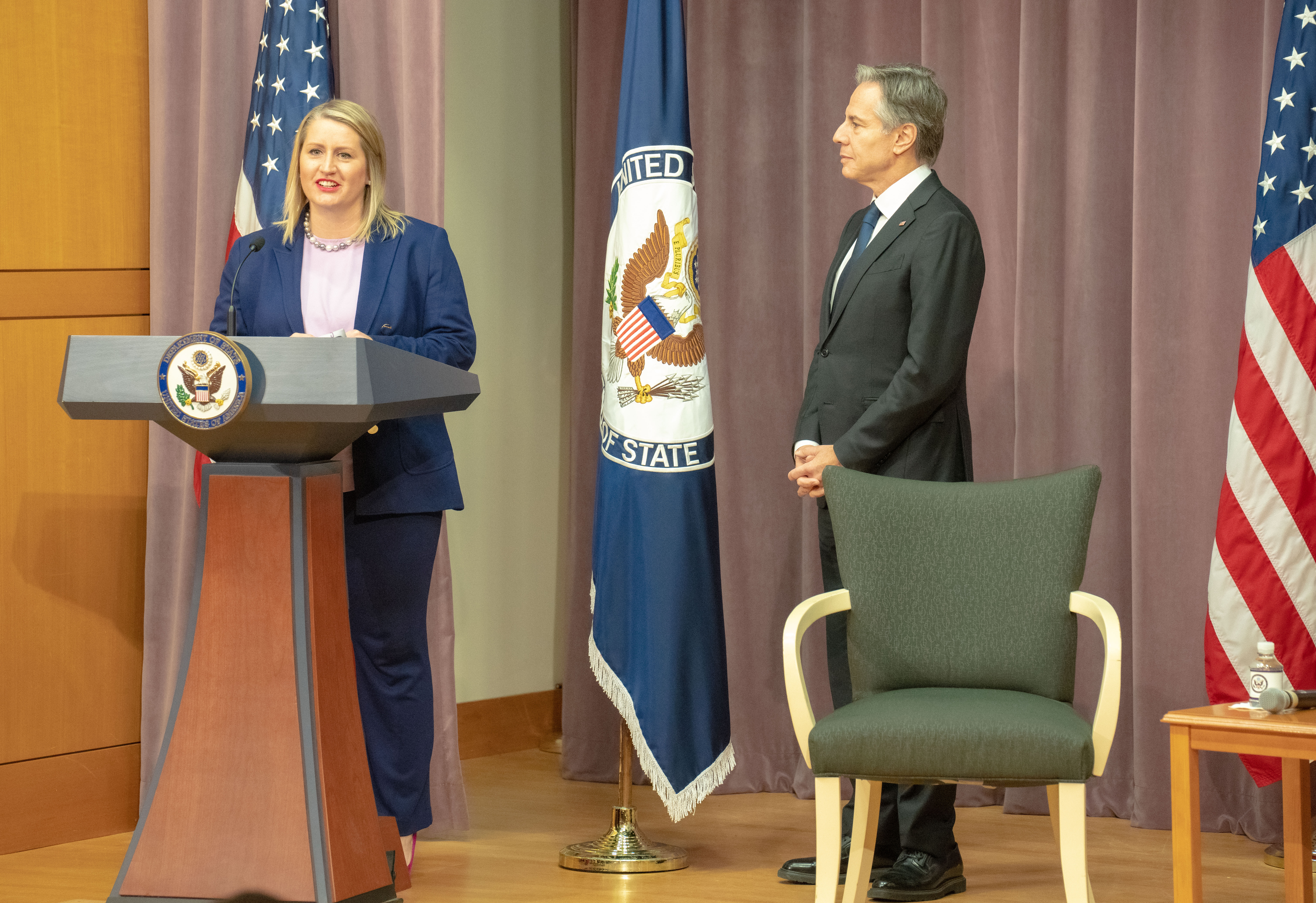
Allen and secretary Blinken during a global workforce town hall on January 25, 2023.

Allen left as a partner at Finsbury Glover Hering (FGH) when President Biden appointed her as assistant secretary of state for global public affairs on August 25, 2021. She was sworn in on September 13, 2021. Allen has been a central figure in U.S. government's efforts to both combat disinformation surrounding the 2022 Russian invasion of Ukraine and increase support for the Ukrainian people and their government in their war with the Russians.

On April 4, 2022, Secretary of State Antony Blinken delegated to her the functions and authorities of the under secretary of state for public diplomacy and public affairs. On January 23, 2023, President Biden nominated Allen for the permanent role of undersecretary. A hearing on her nomination was held before the Senate Foreign Relations Committee on March 15, 2023. The committee favorably reported her nomination to the Senate on May 3, 2023. On June 12, 2023, the United States Senate invoked cloture on her nomination by a 66–29 vote. On June 13, 2023, Allen was confirmed by a 66–33 vote.

During her tenure as under secretary of state for public diplomacy and public affairs, Liz Allen focused on advancing U.S. foreign policy through strategic communication, cultural exchanges, and countering foreign malign influence. Her tenure involved a proactive approach to harnessing innovative technologies, particularly artificial intelligence (AI), to modernize public diplomacy initiatives. Notably, she participated in the Krach Institute's Annual Tech Freedom Summit on November 8, 2023, alongside Michelle Guida, the former acting senior State official for public diplomacy under the Trump administration, emphasizing the role of emerging technology and AI in public diplomacy.

Under Secretary Allen concentrated on enhancing the scope of cultural and exchange programs under the Educational and Cultural Affairs Bureau. On September 27, 2023, the bureau, under her guidance, launched the State Department Global Music Diplomacy Initiative, using music as a diplomatic tool to support U.S. foreign policy goals. This initiative was inaugurated with a high-profile event featuring Quincy Jones, who received the inaugural Peace Through Music Award. Furthermore, Allen has strengthened U.S. global youth programs, as evidenced by her participation in the Mandela Washington Fellowship Summit for Young African Leaders on August 2, 2023, and the commemoration of the 10th anniversary of the Young Southeast Asian Leaders Initiative (YSEALI) in Bali, Indonesia, on December 4, 2023. On December 15, 2023, her team facilitated the expanded Memorandum of Understanding between the Smithsonian Institution and the State Department, aiming to enhance cultural, educational, and scientific collaboration. Secretary of State Antony Blinken and Secretary of the Smithsonian Lonnie G. Bunch III signed the expanded memoranda on behalf of their respective organization.

Allen has also emphasized strengthening the department's communication strategies to effectively counter foreign malign influence and disinformation. This included the establishment of bilateral partnerships through the department’s Global Engagement Center. Efforts under her leadership include the signing of a memorandum of understanding with Bulgarian deputy prime minister and minister of foreign affairs Mariya Gabriel on September 25, 2023, to combat disinformation and media manipulation in Central and Eastern Europe. She also launched the inaugural U.S.-ROK Public Diplomacy Dialogue and signed an MOU with the Republic of Korea on December 1, 2023, alongside ROK Ministry of Foreign Affairs deputy minister for public affairs Ambassador Hong Seok-in, focusing on countering foreign information manipulation. Additionally, on December 6, 2023, Allen signed a memorandum of cooperation with Japan, in partnership with Japan's Ministry of Foreign Affairs press secretary, assistant minister, and director-general for press and public diplomacy Kobayashi Maki, to address the regional and global threat of information manipulation.

Throughout her term as under secretary, Allen traveled extensively, representing the United States, and engaging with foreign dignitaries, international forums, and local communities. Her travels included visits to France, Fiji, Vanuatu, Australia, Norway, Bulgaria, the Czech Republic, the Republic of Korea, Indonesia, Japan, and culminated in the opening of the U.S.-ASEAN Center at the Arizona State University Barrett & O'Connor Washington Center in Washington, D.C. Her visits underscored the U.S.'s commitment to building global understanding and cooperation, and the importance of ASEAN countries in U.S. foreign policy.

Allen resigned from the State Department on August 2, 2024, to join the Harris campaign.

=== Non-government work ===
After the end of the Obama administration, Allen joined the Glover Park Group, a communications consulting firm (now called Finsbury Glover Hering), as senior vice president.

In August 2020, Allen took a leave of absence from Glover Park Group to serve as communications director to Kamala Harris after she was announced as Joe Biden's running mate in the 2020 United States presidential election.

After serving in the Biden administration for nearly three years, Allen joined the Harris campaign as chief of staff for Tim Walz, the incumbent vice president's own running mate in the 2024 United States presidential election, after President Biden's withdrawal from the race in August of that year. At the time Allen took on the role, Harris had not yet chosen Walz as her running mate.

In April 2025, Allen was named as the new chief external affairs officer at the NFL Players Association. In this role, she leads the union’s communications and public affairs strategy, ensuring that the priorities of NFL players are clearly represented to all stakeholders in football. Her work focuses on strengthening advocacy efforts and amplifying awareness of the union’s mission.
