= Under Secretary of State for Public Diplomacy and Public Affairs =

Position in the United States Department of State

United States Under Secretary of State for Public Diplomacy and Public Affairs
- Seal of the United States Department of State

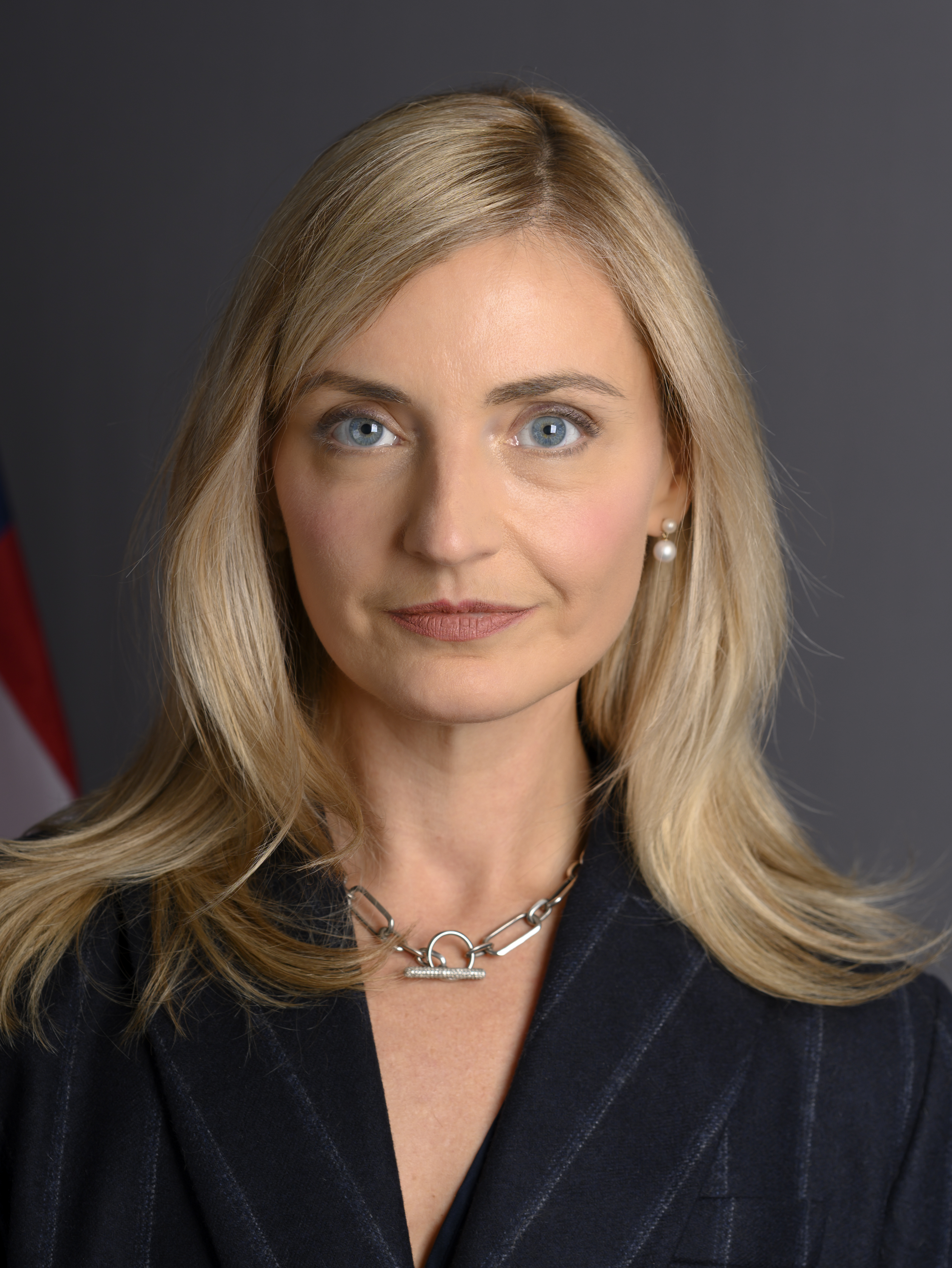
- Incumbent; Sarah B. Rogers since October 10, 2025
- United States Department of State
- Reports to: The U.S. secretary of state
- Seat: Washington, D.C.
- Appointer: The president with Senate advice and consent
- Term length: No fixed term
- Inaugural holder: Evelyn S. Lieberman
- Formation: October 1, 1999
- Salary: Executive Schedule, Level 3
- Website: Official Website

The under secretary of state for public diplomacy and public affairs is currently a top-ten ranking position in the U.S. Department of State tasked to help ensure public diplomacy is practiced in combination with public affairs and traditional diplomacy to advance U.S. national interests. The under secretary oversees two bureaus at the State Department: Educational and Cultural Affairs and Global Public Affairs. Also reporting to the under secretary are the Office of Policy, Planning and Resources for Public Diplomacy and Public Affairs, and the Advisory Commission on Public Diplomacy.

The position was created on October 1, 1999, during the presidency of Bill Clinton after Title XIII, Section 1313 of the Foreign Affairs Reform and Restructuring Act of 1998 (112 Stat. 2681-776). Section 2305 of the Act (112 Stat. 2681-825) increased the number of under secretaries of state from five to six. Subdivision A of the Act, also known as the Foreign Affairs Agencies Consolidation Act of 1998, abolished the United States Information Agency and the Arms Control and Disarmament Agency.

On April 4, 2022, Elizabeth M. Allen was named acting under secretary by designation and on June 13, 2023 she was confirmed by a vote of 66–33 in the United States Senate. She assumed office on June 15, 2023.

Full appointments to the position require confirmation by the Senate.

From October 1, 1999, through August 29, 2019, the under secretary has been without a confirmed appointment 35.8% of the days. The average time between confirmed appointments is 289 days (or over 9.5 months). The office was without a confirmed under secretary for 37.2% of the Bush administration, 21.8% of the Obama administration, and 92.9% of the first Trump administration.

== List of under secretaries of state for public diplomacy and public affairs ==
#	Name	In office	Image	President(s) served under
1	Evelyn S. Lieberman	October 1, 1999 – January 19, 2001		Bill Clinton
2	Charlotte Beers	October 2, 2001 – March 28, 2003		George W. Bush
3	Margaret D. Tutwiler	December 16, 2003 – June 30, 2004		George W. Bush
4	Karen Hughes	September 9, 2005 – December 14, 2007		George W. Bush
5	James K. Glassman	June 10, 2008 – January 15, 2009		George W. Bush
6	Judith McHale	May 26, 2009 – July 1, 2011		Barack Obama
-	Kathleen Stephens	February 6, 2012 – April 4, 2012 (Acting)		Barack Obama
7	Tara Sonenshine	April 5, 2012 – July 1, 2013		Barack Obama
8	Richard Stengel	February 11, 2014 – December 7, 2016		Barack Obama
-	D. Bruce Wharton	December 8, 2016 – July 2017 (Acting)		Barack Obama; Donald Trump
9	Steve Goldstein	December 4, 2017 – March 13, 2018		Donald Trump
-	Heather Nauert	March 13, 2018 – October 10, 2018 (Acting)		Donald Trump
-	Michelle Giuda	February 12, 2019 – March 3, 2020 (Acting by designation)		Donald Trump
-	Ulrich Brechbuhl	March 3, 2020 – September 28, 2020 (Acting by designation)		Donald Trump
-	Nilda Pedrosa	September 28, 2020 – January 20, 2021 (Acting by designation)		Donald Trump
-	Jennifer Hall Godfrey	January 20, 2021 – April 1, 2022 (Acting by designation)		Joe Biden
10	Elizabeth M. Allen	April 4, 2022 – June 15, 2023 (Acting by designation); June 15, 2023 – August 2, 2024		Joe Biden
-	Lee Satterfield	August 3, 2024 - January 20, 2025 (Acting)		Joe Biden
-	Darren Beattie	February 4, 2025 - October 10, 2025 (Acting)		Donald Trump
11	Sarah B. Rogers	October 10, 2025 - Present		Donald Trump

== See also ==
- United States Under Secretary of State
- Under Secretary of State for Economic Growth, Energy, and the Environment
- Under Secretary of State for Political Affairs
- Under Secretary of State for Arms Control and International Security
- Under Secretary of State for Management
- Under Secretary of State for Civilian Security, Democracy, and Human Rights
