= Aaron Ringel =

American political advisor

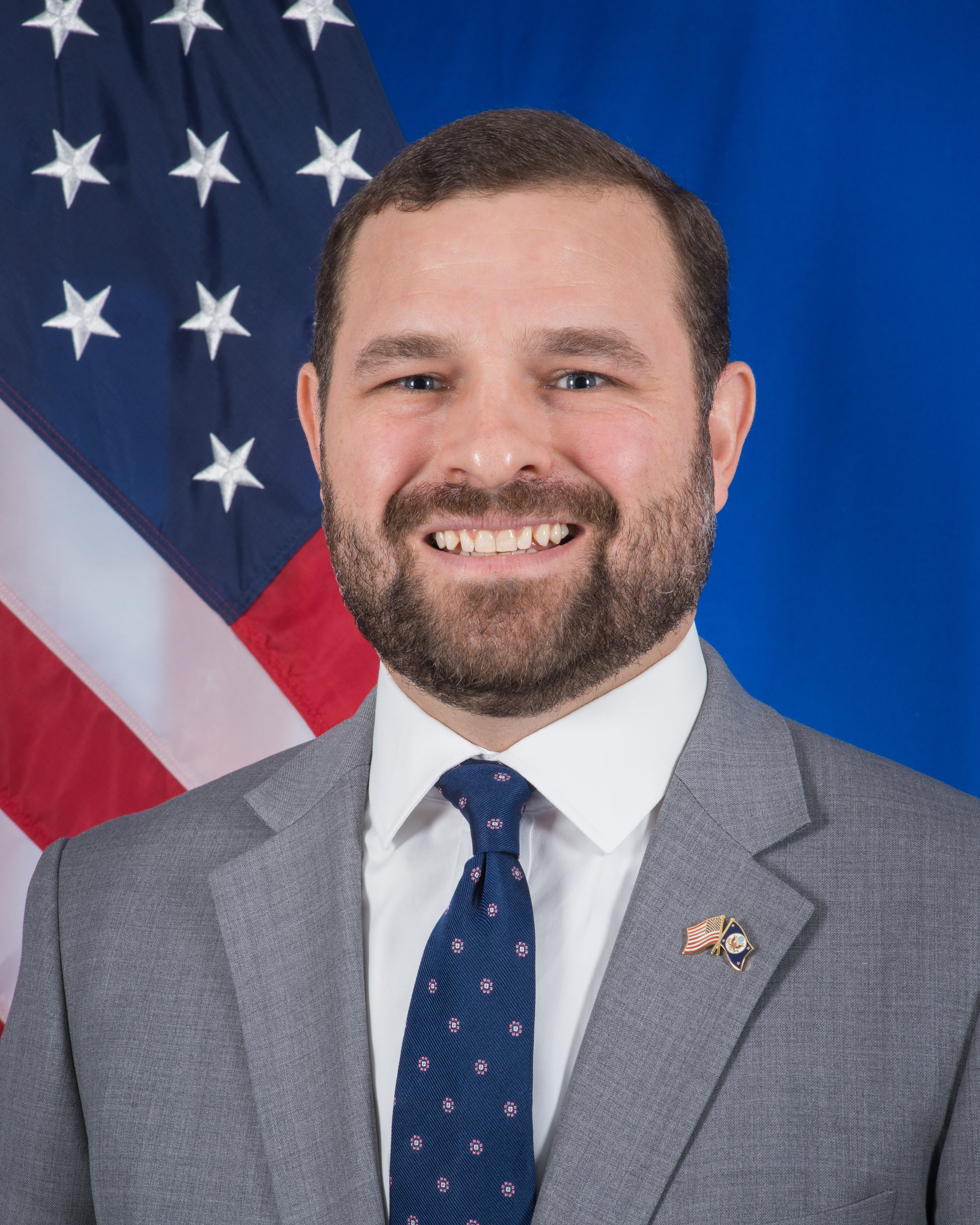
- Official portrait, 2020

2nd Assistant Secretary of State for Global Public Affairs
- In office September 14, 2020 – January 20, 2021
- President: Donald Trump
- Preceded by: Michelle Giuda
- Succeeded by: Elizabeth M. Allen

Personal details
- Party: Republican
- Education: New Mexico Military Institute (AA); University of Kansas (BA); American University (MA)

Military service
- Branch/service: United States Marine Corps
- Battles/wars: Iraq War

Aaron E. Ringel is an American political advisor who served as the assistant secretary of state for global public affairs from 2020 to 2021 during the presidency of Donald Trump.

== Education ==
Ringel earned an associate degree from the New Mexico Military Institute, a Bachelor of Arts degree in political science and international affairs from the University of Kansas, and a Master of Arts in U.S. foreign policy from American University.

== Career ==
Ringel served in the United States Marine Corps Reserve for eight years and was deployed to Iraq in 2005. In 2006 and 2007, he was a legislative assistant at Bracewell LLP. He then worked as an aide in the United States House of Representatives for one year. In 2009, Ringel was an unsuccessful Republican candidate for a seat in the Virginia House of Delegates.

Ringel later worked on the political campaign of Michael Grimm and joined Grimm's congressional staff as legislative director. From 2014 to 2017, he was the legislative director for then-Congressman Mike Pompeo. In 2017, he was deputy chief of staff for Congressman Richard Hudson. In May 2017, Ringel joined the United States Environmental Protection Agency as deputy associate administrator for congressional affairs. In 2019, he became a senior advisor in the Bureau of Energy Resources. He became assistant Secretary of state for global public affairs in September 2020.
