= You (Time Person of the Year) =

2006 choice for Time's Person of the Year

Cover of the December 25, 2006 issue. Based on the design of the iMac from that year. Gray area is a reflective mirror surface.

"You" was the official choice for Time's Person of the Year in 2006. The magazine set out to recognize the millions of people who anonymously contribute user-generated content to websites such as YouTube, MySpace, Facebook, Wikipedia and other wikis, and the multitudes of other websites featuring user contribution.

While the status had been given before to inanimate objects, with the personal computer being the "Machine of the Year" for 1982, as well as collections of people or an abstract representative of a movement, the choice of "You" attracted criticism from commentators in publications such as The Atlantic for being too much of a pop culture gimmick. A 2014 New York Daily News article named the 2006 award as one of the ten most controversial "Person of the Year" moments in the history of Time. The news magazine experienced generally successful sales.

== Background ==
While most earlier choices for "Person of the Year" have been historically important individuals, many of them infamous rather than internationally popular (Adolf Hitler was 1938's "Man of the Year", and Ayatollah Khomeini won in 1979), a few were inanimate. The personal computer was the "Machine of the Year" for 1982, while the "Endangered Earth" was the "Planet of the Year" for 1988. Collections of people as well as a symbolic representative of multiple individuals had also won the award before; for example, "U.S. Scientists" were named "Men of the Year" in 1960.

Similar media awards had already recognized the growing significance of online community and user-generated content: "You!" was the first ranking choice in Business 2.0's list of "50 people who matter now" in July 2006; while ABC News had listed bloggers as "People of the Year" for 2006.

== Decision ==
In accordance with Time's annual process, different bureaus suggested different candidates. "You", or "the YouTube guys", was floated in November as a possible winner. Readers' opinions were canvassed online. The final decision was made by managing editor Richard Stengel.

The decision was announced in Time's December 25, 2006 issue. The cover of the magazine featured an iMac computer with a reflective mylar pane appearing as the window of a YouTube-like video player, intended to reflect as online content the face of whoever picks up the magazine. The time remaining indicator in the image indicates a total duration of "20:06." Stories on the new user-driven media dynamic were provided by NBC editor Brian Williams and Time editors Lev Grossman and Richard Stengel. As Grossman describes, "It's about the many wresting power from the few and helping one another for nothing and how that will not only change the world, but also change the way the world changes."

== Criticism ==
The choice of "You" as Person of the Year was criticized for not mentioning important people that influenced the events of 2006. Paul Kedrosky called it an "incredible cop-out", and he also speculated that the selection marked "some sort of near-term market top for user-generated content". Commentator Kevin Friedl noted that the award and cover design recalled the mirror viewed by the protagonist, the Dude, of The Big Lebowski, via which the viewer's reflection was framed as Time's "Man of the Year".

In December 2012, journalist David A. Graham wrote for The Atlantic that he thought Time had shown "a pattern of lackluster choices" and the overall promotional nature of the process shouldn't be treated as news, rather simply viewed as marketing. He remarked, "Is anyone out there not sick of people ironically listing 'Time Person of the Year, 2006' in Twitter bios, a reference to the gimmicky selection of 'You' that year?"

The decision raised some criticism as it was described as ideological and even hypocritically political. Some weeks before the announcement, Time decided to ask the users in a poll, "Who Should Be Person of the Year?" After several weeks, the poll winner by a wide margin was Hugo Chávez, the president of Venezuela, with 35% of the votes. The president of Iran, Mahmoud Ahmadinejad, came in second. Time did not mention these results in the announcement of their "Person of the Year" and its critics claimed that Time discounted input from its digital democracy among its readers. Time supporters argue that an online poll is not representative as it has no scientific value. The hyperlink to the online poll results has been removed. A 2014 New York Daily News article, which named the "You" naming as one of the ten most controversial "Person of the Year" moments in the history of Time, also remarked that "2006 had its fair share of newsmakers" while highlighting both Chávez and Ahmadinejad.
