= Tara Sonenshine =

American diplomat and former journalist

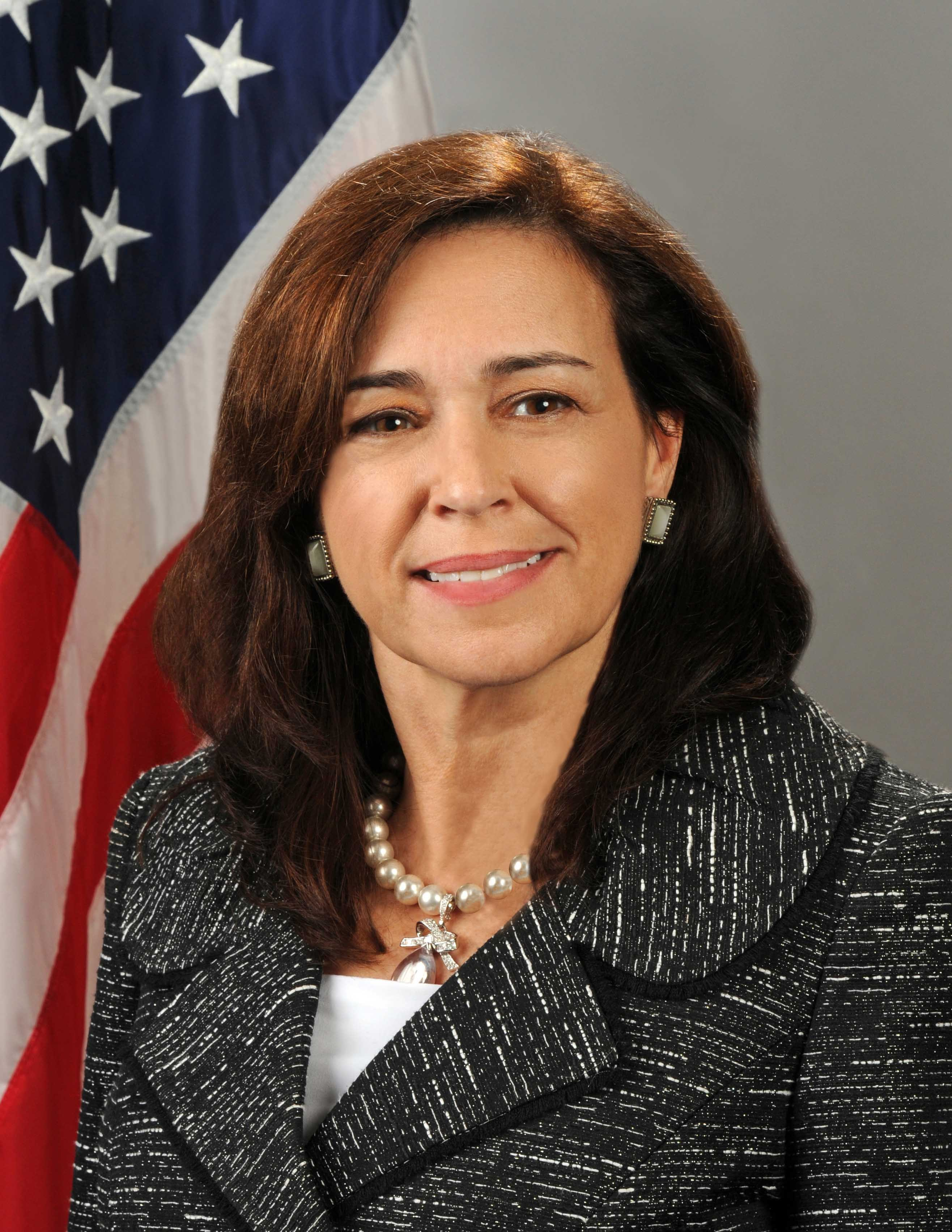
- Official portrait, 2012

7th Under Secretary of State for Public Diplomacy and Public Affairs
- In office April 5, 2012 – July 1, 2013
- President: Barack Obama
- Preceded by: Judith McHale
- Succeeded by: Richard Stengel

Personal details
- Born: 1959 (age 66–67)
- Spouse: Gary Friend
- Children: 2
- Education: Tufts University (BA)
- Occupation: Journalist; diplomat; academic
- Website: Tara Sonenshine

Tara D. Sonenshine (born 1959) is an American diplomat and former journalist in broadcast and print news. She served as the Under Secretary of State for Public Diplomacy and Public Affairs at the Department of State from 2012 to 2013. She is now the Edward R. Murrow Professor of Practice in Public Diplomacy at The Fletcher School at Tufts University. Previously, she was a distinguished fellow at the George Washington University School of Media and Public Affairs. Sonenshine also was senior career coach at the Elliott School of International Affairs at George Washington University from 2017 to 2020. In this role she assisted students in the master's program to navigate their global careers.

In 1981, she graduated from Tufts University Phi Beta Kappa with a BA in political science.

Sonenshine is the recipient of ten News Emmy Awards in broadcast journalism. She had been the Executive Vice President of the United States Institute of Peace. Sonenshine served in various capacities at the White House during the Clinton Administration, including transition director, director of foreign policy planning and deputy director of communications for the National Security Council and Special Assistant to the President.

She was on the board of Silkroad, the nonprofit organization founded by cellist Yo-Yo Ma, and the advisory board for Washington, D.C. nonprofit America Abroad Media.

Sonenshine began her broadcasting career by working for ABC News in New York. She worked as a reporter at the Pentagon for ABC News, and for more than a decade she was editorial producer of ABC News's Nightline. Sonenshine has written multiple articles for newspapers like the New York Times, Boston Globe, and the Washington Post and routine op-eds for The Hill.
