= Steve Goldstein (diplomat) =

American diplomat & government official (born 1952)

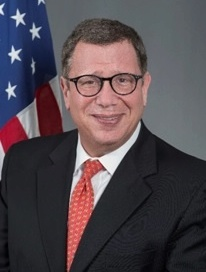
- Official portrait, 2017

9th Under Secretary of State for Public Diplomacy and Public Affairs
- In office December 4, 2017 – March 13, 2018
- President: Donald Trump
- Preceded by: Richard Stengel
- Succeeded by: Elizabeth M. Allen (2023)

Assistant to the Secretary and Director of Public Affairs at United States Department of the Interior
- In office February 3, 1989 – January 20, 1993
- President: George H. W. Bush

Personal details
- Born: Irwin Steven Goldstein; 1952 (age 73–74) Nashville, Tennessee
- Party: Republican
- Children: Jack Reason
- Education: University School of Nashville; University of Arizona

Irwin Steven Goldstein (born 1952) is a former American diplomat, government official, and businessman who served as Under Secretary of State for Public Diplomacy and Public Affairs at the United States Department of State during Secretary Rex Tillerson's tenure in the first Trump Administration. He was also Assistant to the Secretary and Director of Public Affairs at the United States Department of the Interior under Manuel Lujan Jr. during the Presidency of George H. W. Bush.

In the private sector, Goldstein directed communications at several large financial services companies, including as Senior Vice President and Chief Communications Officer at AllianceBernstein and Executive Vice President and Chief Communications Officer at TIAA-CREF. He was also Vice President, Corporate Communications at Dow Jones & Company.

Goldstein is Chief Communications Officer at the Long-Term Stock Exchange (LTSE), a stock exchange based in New York City.

== Early years ==
Irwin Steven Goldstein was born to Bernie and Sandra Goldstein of Nashville, Tennessee. Goldstein graduated from the University School of Nashville. He attended and graduated from the University of Arizona, where he earned a bachelor's degree in political science and education. After college, he worked as a teacher.

== Private sector career ==
Goldstein served as senior vice president of BP Global Solutions.

Goldstein was employed at Dow Jones/The Wall Street Journal, where he was Vice President of Corporate Communications.

Goldstein worked at TIAA for seven years, serving as its Executive Vice president and Chief Communications Officer. He stepped down from the position as of September 30, 2010.

He is currently Chief Communications Officer at the Long-Term Stock Exchange (LTSE), an SEC-registered national securities exchange built to serve companies and investors who share a long-term vision.

== Public sector career ==
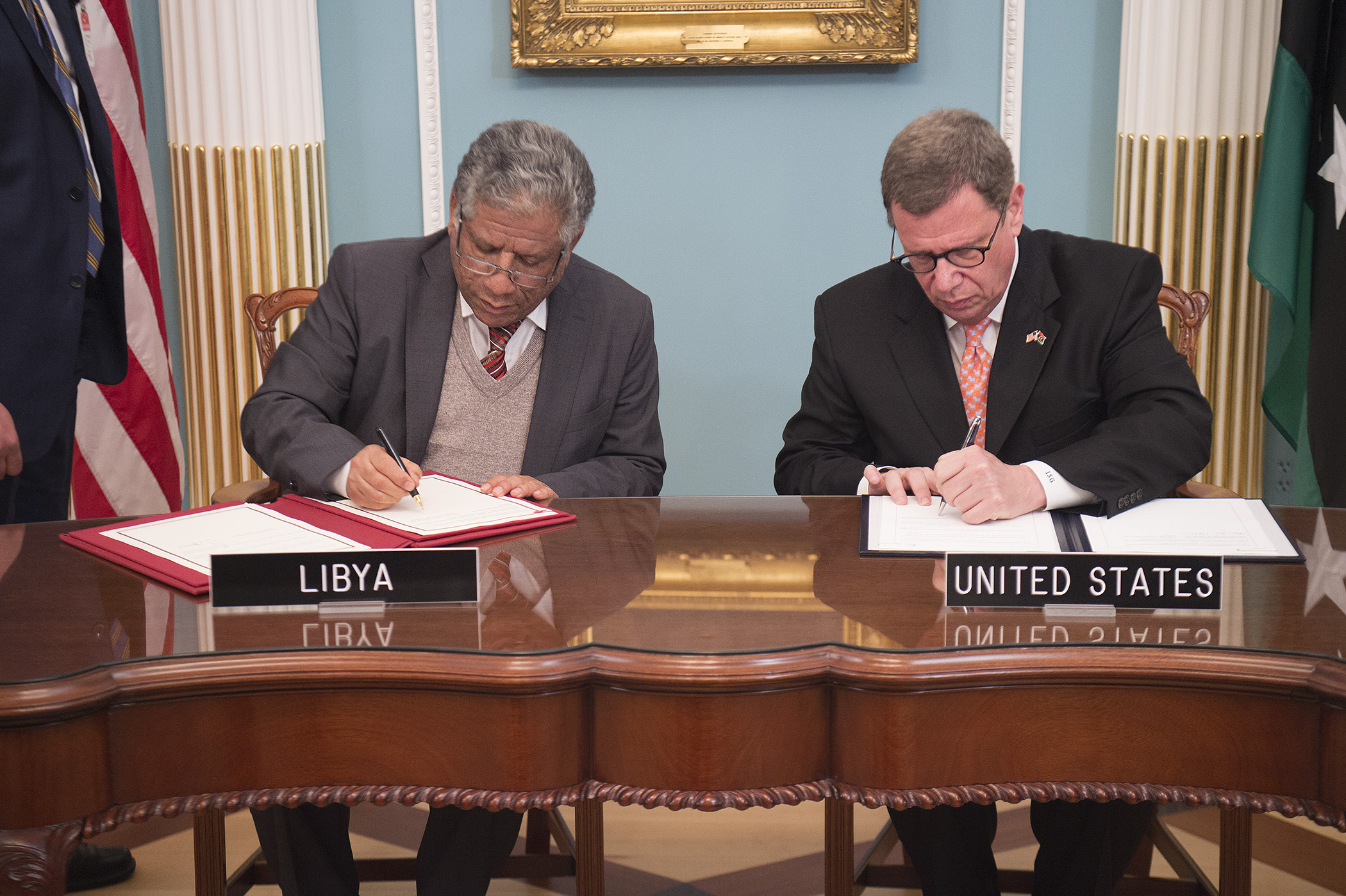
Goldstein (right) signs a Memorandum of Understanding on cultural property protection with Libya in 2018

Goldstein spent eight years working as a press secretary and chief of staff for several members of Congress, including Manuel Lujan and Ronald Machtley.

When President George H. W. Bush appointed Lujan the U.S. Secretary of Interior, Goldstein was hired to work as his spokesperson. Goldstein's official titles at the U.S. Department of the Interior were Assistant to the Secretary and Director of Public Affairs.

President Donald Trump nominated Goldstein to Under Secretary of State for Public Diplomacy and Public Affairs, the State Department's public relations and public affairs chief. Moira Whelan, who served as the Deputy Assistant Secretary for Digital Strategy at the State Department during the Obama administration, said Goldstein would be a "key player in the effort to push back against Russian disinformation efforts around the world and in the United States." Goldstein was unanimously confirmed by the Senate, and he was sworn into the position on December 4, 2017.

Shortly after President Trump dismissed Secretary of State Rex Tillerson on March 13, 2018, Goldstein released a statement that Tillerson did not know why he had been fired and that Tillerson had only learned of his firing that morning from Trump's tweet. Goldstein's statement was seen as contradicting the official account of Tillerson's dismissal, and Goldstein was fired from his position. According to Axios, Goldstein was disliked in the White House "and seen as openly anti-Trump."

Political offices
Preceded by Richard Stengel	Under Secretary of State for Public Diplomacy and Public Affairs; 2017–2018	Succeeded by Heather Nauert; Acting
