= Richard Stengel =

American journalist (born 1955)

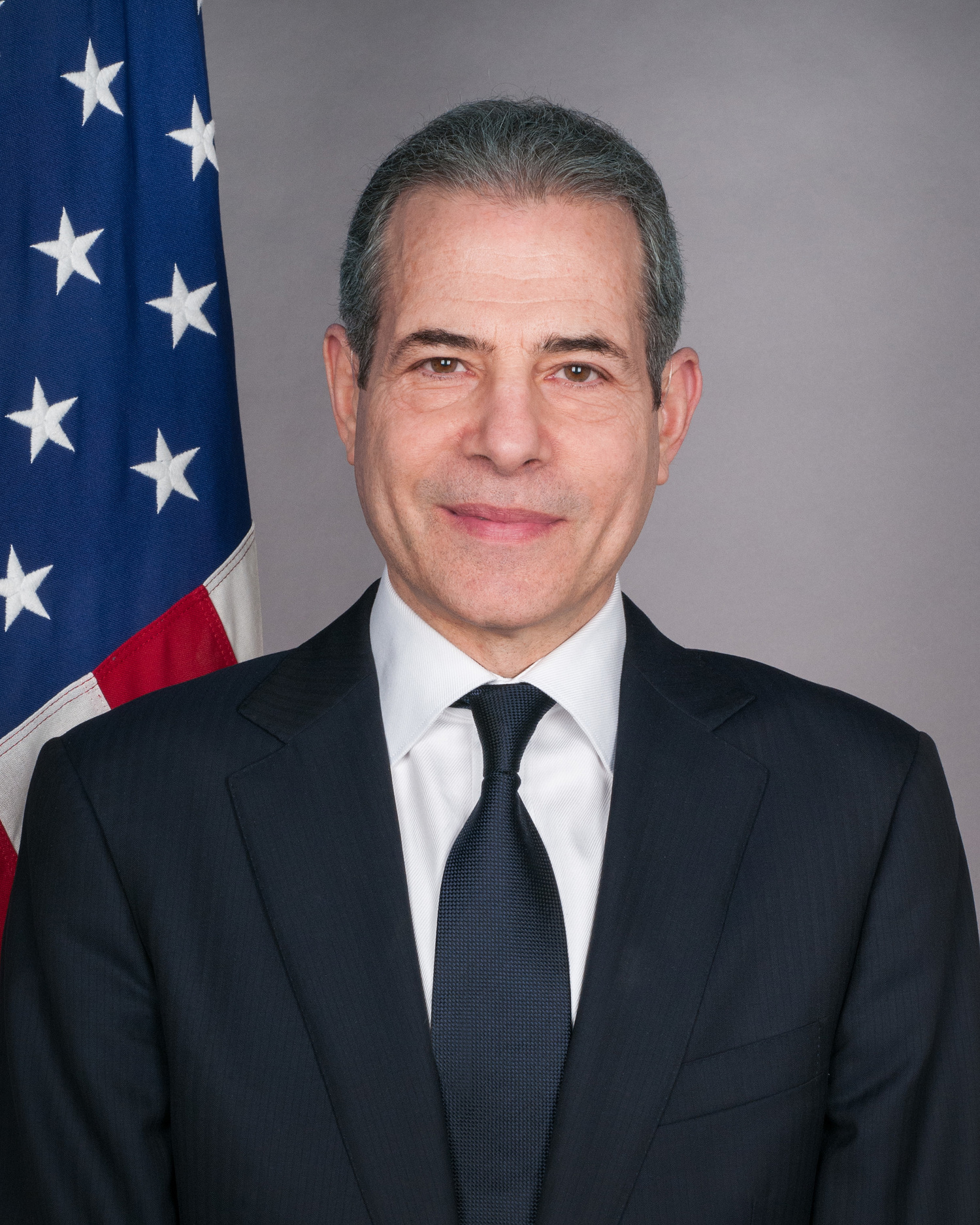
- Official portrait, 2014

8th Under Secretary of State for Public Diplomacy and Public Affairs
- In office February 14, 2014 – December 8, 2016
- President: Barack Obama
- Preceded by: Tara Sonenshine
- Succeeded by: Steve Goldstein

Chairperson and CEO of the National Constitution Center
- In office March 1, 2004 – June 1, 2006
- Preceded by: Joe Torsella
- Succeeded by: Joe Torsella

Personal details
- Born: May 2, 1955 (age 71) New York City, U.S.
- Party: Democratic
- Spouse: Mary Pfaff
- Children: 2
- Education: Princeton University (BA); Christ Church, Oxford

Richard Allen Stengel (born May 2, 1955) is an American editor, author, and former government official. He was Time magazine's 16th managing editor from 2006 to 2013. He was also chief executive of the National Constitution Center from 2004 to 2006, and served as President Obama's Under Secretary of State for Public Diplomacy and Public Affairs from 2014 to 2016. Stengel has written a number of books, including a collaboration with Nelson Mandela on Mandela's autobiography, Long Walk to Freedom.

His 2019 book, Information Wars: How we Lost the Battle Against Disinformation and What to Do About It, recounts his time in the State Department countering Russian disinformation and ISIS propaganda. In December 2022, Audible released Stengel's 10-part podcast, Mandela: The Lost Tapes, which uses more than 60 hours of taped interviews Stengel did with Mandela for Long Walk to Freedom.

== Early life and education ==
Stengel was born in New York City into a Jewish family, and raised in Westchester County where he attended Scarsdale High School.

He attended Princeton University and played on the Princeton Tigers basketball team as part of the 1975 National Invitation Tournament. He graduated magna cum laude in 1977. After college, he won a Rhodes Scholarship and studied English and history at Christ Church, Oxford.

== Career ==
=== Early career ===
Stengel joined Time in 1981 and contributed to the magazine through the early and mid-1980s, including articles on South Africa, which he also covered for Rolling Stone magazine. He became a senior writer and essayist for Time, covering both the 1988 and 1996 presidential campaigns.

While working for Time, Stengel also wrote for The New Yorker, The New Republic, Spy, and the New York Times and appeared on television as a commentator. Using his experiences as a journalist as a basis, in 1999 Stengel became a Ferris Professor at Princeton teaching a course on "Politics and the Press". He was one of the original on-air contributors for MSNBC.

Stengel left Time in 1999, to become a senior advisor and chief speechwriter for Bill Bradley who ran unsuccessfully for the Democratic nomination for the 2000 presidential election.

=== Time.com ===
Stengel returned to Time in 2000 and took on the role of managing editor of Time.com. As announced by Time Inc. in May 2000, Stengel replaced Richard Duncan in the role and took on the responsibilities of overseeing news coverage and editorial content. He later held several other roles at Time, including a period as national editor of the magazine.

=== National Constitution Center ===
Stengel left his role as national editor of Time in February 2004 to become the president and CEO of the National Constitution Center, a museum and education center in Philadelphia on March 1, 2004. He succeeded Joe Torsella (who resigned and unsuccessfully sought a seat in the U.S. House from the 13th district) in the position, with the role of raising the center's profile, adding to its endowment, and increasing the number of visitors.

At the Constitution Center, Stengel was responsible for starting the Peter Jennings Institute, offering constitutional training for journalists; a founding partnership with Constitution High School, a School District of Philadelphia public school for students interested in history and government; summer teacher institutes; and brought the Liberty Medal to the organization.

=== Managing editor of Time ===
In 2006, Stengel once again returned to Time, this time as managing editor of the magazine. The appointment was announced on May 17, 2006, by the editor in chief of Time Inc., John Huey, and he officially entered the role on June 15, 2006 as the 16th managing editor of the magazine, which was in its 83rd year at the time. In his role as managing editor, he oversaw Time Magazine and Time.com, as well as Time Books, and Time for Kids.

His first major initiative was to change the magazine's news-stand date to Friday, starting in early 2007. Following this, Stengel implemented an ambitious graphic redesign and changes in the magazine's content, stating that he wanted the magazine to be more selective and to give the reader "knowledge" rather than "undigested information". He increased reporting on war and politics. In his first year as managing editor, he selected "You" – short for user-generated-content – as Time's "Person of the Year", which was the subject of much media coverage and debate. In 2010, Time chose another social media-oriented "Person of the Year", Facebook founder Mark Zuckerberg.

In 2008, Stengel approved the changing of Time's emblematic red border for only the second time since its adoption. The border was changed to green for a special issue focused on the environment. The cover, which included an altered version of Joe Rosenthal's iconic Raising the Flag on Iwo Jima photograph—substituting a tree for the American flag — was criticized by some veterans groups. Explaining the analogy, Stengel stated his belief that there "needs to be an effort along the lines of preparing for World War II to combat global warming and climate change".

Under his leadership, Time has reported on significant world events such as its coverage of the Iraq war, which he describes in an editorial as necessary in order to remind people not to "turn away", and the 2008 presidential campaign.

Following the election, president-elect Barack Obama was selected by Stengel as "Person of the Year" for Obama's 14th appearance on Time's cover in 2008. Stengel writes editorials for Time, including a 2010 piece explaining their use on Time's cover of a portrait of an 18-year-old Afghan woman whose nose and ears had been cut off by the Taliban as a punishment for running away from her in-laws. For a Time cover story in December 2010, he interviewed WikiLeaks spokesperson Julian Assange over Skype, in which Assange called for the resignation of United States Secretary of State Hillary Clinton.

Stengel was listed as number 41 on Newsweek's 2010 "Power 50" list in November 2010. He regularly appears on CNN and MSNBC news programs.

In 2012, Stengel received a News & Documentary Emmy Award for his work as executive producer on Time.com's Beyond 9/11: Portraits of Resilience and, on behalf of Time Magazine, Stengel accepted the "Magazine of the Year" award at the National Magazine Awards. In May of the same year, Stengel interviewed Israeli Prime Minister Benjamin Netanyahu for a cover story of his that referred to Netanyahu as the "King of Israel". In November 2012, Stengel conducted an interview with Mohamed Morsi after he became Egypt's president. Among other coverage, the interview drew media attention for Morsi's remarks on the 1968 science fiction film Planet of the Apes.

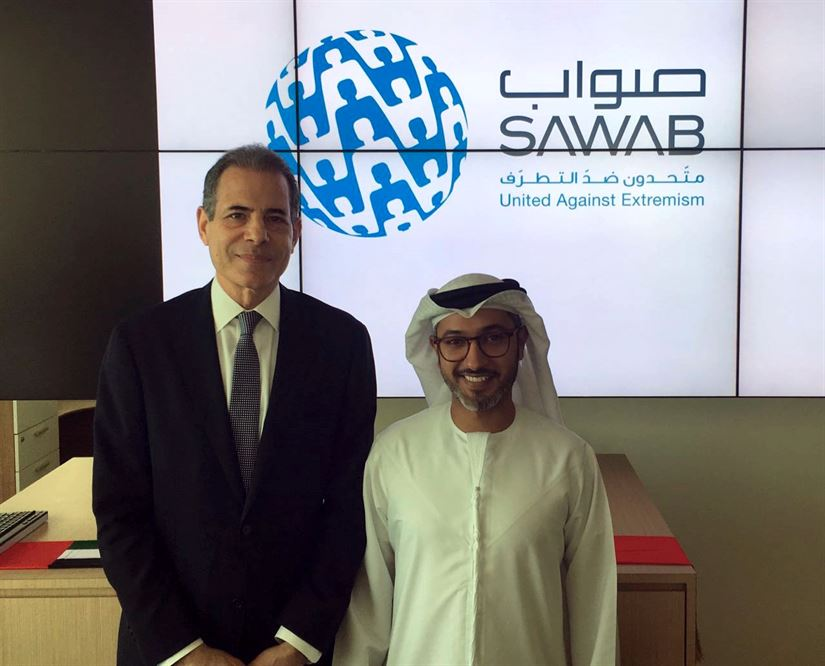
Richard Stengel visits the Sawab Center in Abu Dhabi, United Arab Emirates, the first-ever multinational online messaging and engagement program in support of the global coalition against Islamic State of Iraq and the Levant (ISIL)

On September 12, 2013, Stengel announced he would be leaving TIME magazine for a role as Under Secretary of State for Public Diplomacy and Public Affairs, the role responsible for leading "America's public diplomacy outreach, which includes communications with international audiences, cultural programming, academic grants, educational exchanges, international visitor programs, and U.S. Government efforts to confront ideological support for terrorism," according to the State Department's website.

=== Government service ===
Stengel served as President Obama's Under Secretary of State for Public Diplomacy and Public Affairs from 2014 to 2016. Stengel modernized the State Department's communications efforts, including getting all embassies on social media and using new digital platforms to help America tell its story abroad. Stengel led the department's counter-disinformation efforts, which included managing State's counter-ISIS messaging center, The Center for Strategic Counter Terrorism Communications, and started the first counter Russian disinformation hub at the department. That ultimately led to an executive order creating the Global Engagement Center, tasked with countering disinformation globally. He also helped create a joint effort between the Peace Corps and the State Department called “English for All,” a whole-of-government effort to teach English around the world. In December 2016, Stengel became the longest serving Under Secretary of State for Public Diplomacy in American history.

In November 2020, Stengel was named a member of the Joe Biden presidential transition Agency Review Team to support transition efforts related to the U.S. Agency for Global Media.

=== Other ===
Stengel was a strategic adviser at Snap, Inc. from 2017 to 2021, working primarily on communications.

Stengel is currently an on-air analyst for MSNBC and NBC who comments on political news of the day. Stengel is also a member of the board of directors of CARE, the global humanitarian and poverty relief organization.

== National Service Movement ==
In September 2007, Stengel wrote a Time cover story called "The Case For National Service" in which he argued that Americans needed to redouble their efforts to get involved in community service and volunteerism, and that the presidential candidates needed to make the issue a top priority in the 2008 presidential campaign. Through this essay, he became involved with national service groups Be the Change, City Year, Civic Enterprises, and others to form ServiceNation, a coalition of more than 100 organizations dedicated to promoting national service and volunteerism.

ServiceNation announced that it had secured both U.S. presidential candidates to participate in Presidential Forum on National Service at Columbia University on September 11, 2008. Stengel served as co-moderator of the forum, along with PBS journalist Judy Woodruff, and both Senators Barack Obama and John McCain answered questions in front of a live audience at Columbia University about their plans for national service.

On September 12, 2008, Stengel was a featured speaker at the ServiceNation Summit in New York, along with Caroline Kennedy, Senator Hillary Clinton, First Lady Laura Bush and New York City Mayor Michael Bloomberg. In February 2009, he testified alongside Usher Raymond, former U.S. Senator Harris Wofford and others, in front of the United States House Committee on Education and Labor about the importance of national service, leading to the passage of the Edward M. Kennedy Serve America Act (H.R. 1388). Among other provisions, the bill helped to establish a Summer of Service Program, increase the number of AmeriCorps opportunities and establish a nationwide Call to Service Campaign.

Stengel was awarded Citizen of the Year at the Annual National Conference on Citizenship on September 17, 2010. He has also been presented with the 2010 Lifetime of Idealism Award, awarded to him by City Year Washington, D.C. for "his commitment to promoting and expanding opportunities for Americans to serve".

== Published works ==
Stengel has authored several books. His first was January Sun: One Day, Three Lives, A South African Town, a non-fiction work about the lives of three men in rural South Africa, published in 1990.

Stengel is best known for is his collaboration with Nelson Mandela on Mandela's autobiography, Long Walk to Freedom. In 1992, he signed a ghostwriting deal with publishers Little, Brown to work on the book, having first been cleared by the African National Congress as a suitable author. The book was published in 1995, and was praised by the Financial Times, which stated: "Their collaboration produced surely one of the great autobiographies of the 20th century". Stengel later served as co-producer of the 1996 documentary film Mandela, which was nominated for an Academy Award.

In 2000, Stengel published You're Too Kind: A Brief History of Flattery, a popular history of flattery.

Mandela's Way: Fifteen Lessons on Life, Love and Courage was released in March 2010 and is based on Stengel's personal interactions with Nelson Mandela. The book drew praise from former U.S. President Bill Clinton, as well as Deepak Chopra and Henry Louis Gates Jr.

In 2012, Stengel edited and wrote the lead essay for the book The Constitution: The Essential User's Guide, which explored the relevance of the U.S. Constitution in modern-day events.

In 2019, Stengel published Information Wars, which has been praised by Madeleine Albright, Walter Isaacson and Jon Meacham. It tells the story of his efforts to combat both Russian disinformation and ISIS messaging from the State Department, and the eventual formation of the Global Engagement Center, tasked with fighting the global epidemic of disinformation. The book's final chapter details what can be done about disinformation.

In December 2022, Audible released Stengel's 10-part podcast, Mandela: The Lost Tapes, which uses more than 60 hours of taped interviews Stengel did with Mandela for Long Walk to Freedom. The tapes had never before been released in their entirety. The podcast tells the story of Mandela's life, the making of Long Walk to Freedom, and the unusual friendship between Mandela and Stengel. The podcast was covered by The New York Times, Washington Post, the Today Show, The Guardian, and The Times of London. AudioFile called it “a compelling work that makes history come alive.”

== Personal life ==
Stengel is married to Mary Pfaff, a native of South Africa. They have two sons, Gabriel and Anton. The couple met while Stengel was in South Africa working on Nelson Mandela's autobiography. Mandela was godfather to their oldest son, Gabriel.

== Honorary degrees ==
Stengel delivered the commencement address for and received honorary doctorates from Wittenberg University in 2009, Wheaton College in 2011 and Butler University in 2012.

Media offices
Preceded by Jim Kelly	Managing Editor of Time; 2006–2013	Succeeded by Nancy Gibbs
Political offices
Preceded by Tara Sonenshine	Under Secretary of State for Public Diplomacy and Public Affairs; 2014–2016	Succeeded by Steve Goldstein
