= Michelle Giuda =

American government official (born 1985)

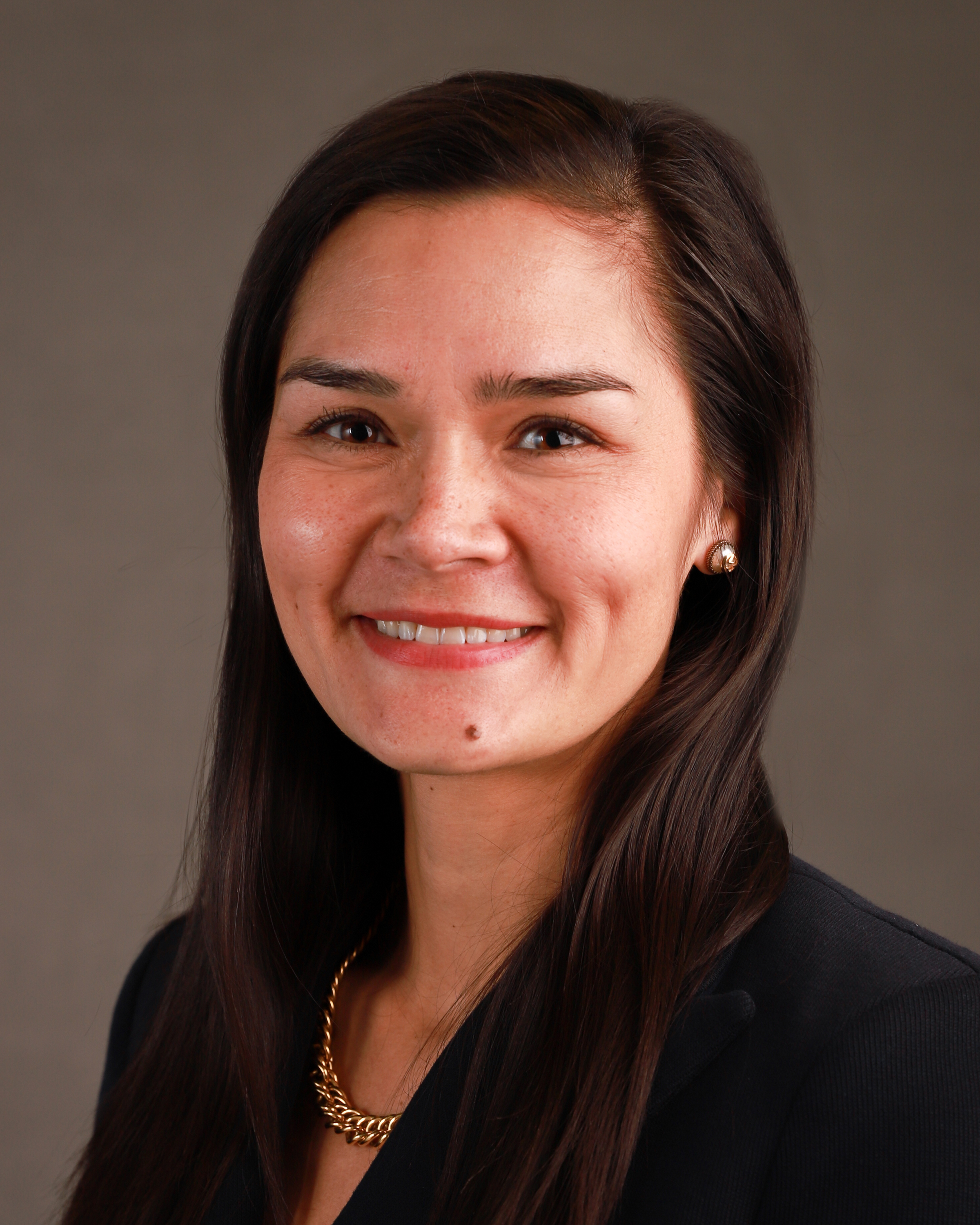
- Official portrait, 2024

Under Secretary of State for Public Diplomacy and Public Affairs
- Acting
- In office February 12, 2019 – March 3, 2020
- President: Donald Trump
- Preceded by: Heather Nauert (Acting)
- Succeeded by: Ulrich Brechbuhl (Acting)

1st Assistant Secretary of State for Global Public Affairs
- In office May 28, 2019 – March 3, 2020
- President: Donald Trump
- Preceded by: Position Established
- Succeeded by: Aaron Ringel

30th Assistant Secretary of State for Public Affairs
- In office February 3, 2018 – May 28, 2019
- President: Donald Trump
- Preceded by: John Kirby
- Succeeded by: Position Abolished

Personal details
- Born: Michelle Mai Selesky; February 18, 1985 (age 41) San Juan Capistrano, California, U.S.
- Education: University of California, Los Angeles (BA); George Washington University (MPS)

Michelle Selesky Giuda (born Michelle Mai Selesky; February 18, 1985) is an American businesswoman and former government official.

As of 2021, she serves on the advisory board for USAGM and the current CEO of the Krach Institute for Tech Diplomacy at Purdue. She was Executive Vice President of Geopolitical Strategy and Risk at the Weber Shandwick public affairs firm. She has served as United States Assistant Secretary of State and acting Under Secretary of State, where she led the largest restructuring of the U.S. State Department in 20 years. She is an NCAA gymnastics champion.

== Early life and education ==
Giuda was born Michelle Mai Selesky in San Juan Capistrano, California, on February 18, 1985. Her Vietnamese mother had fled Vietnam days before the Fall of Saigon in April 1975. Her father served in the U.S. military during the Vietnam War.

Giuda graduated from Aliso Niguel High School in Aliso Viejo in 2003, then graduated with honors from the University of California, Los Angeles (UCLA) in 2007 with a Bachelor of Arts degree in political science. In 2008, Giuda earned a Master of Professional Studies in political management from George Washington University.

=== Gymnastics career ===
In 2000, Giuda won the California high school state championship in floor exercise and placed second in the all-around competition. She competed one year in high school, then exclusively trained and competed at the Club level. She trained at the National Gymnastics Training Center in Aliso Viejo, California.

At UCLA, Giuda was a four-year gymnast, twice serving as a team captain. She was a member of the 2004 UCLA National Championship team and a four-time NACGC academic All-American. She earned All-Pac-10 honors on vault. Her teammates included Olympians Kristen Maloney, Jamie Dantzscher, Mohini Bhardwaj, Kate Richardson, Tasha Schwikert, and Yvonne Tousek.

In 2009, Giuda was featured in a UCLA television advertising campaign highlighting student-athletes.

== Professional career ==
She worked for five years as a senior member of former Speaker Newt Gingrich's communication team including time as the National Deputy Press Secretary for his 2012 presidential campaign.

PR News named her one of the 30 Under 30 Rising Stars in 2015.

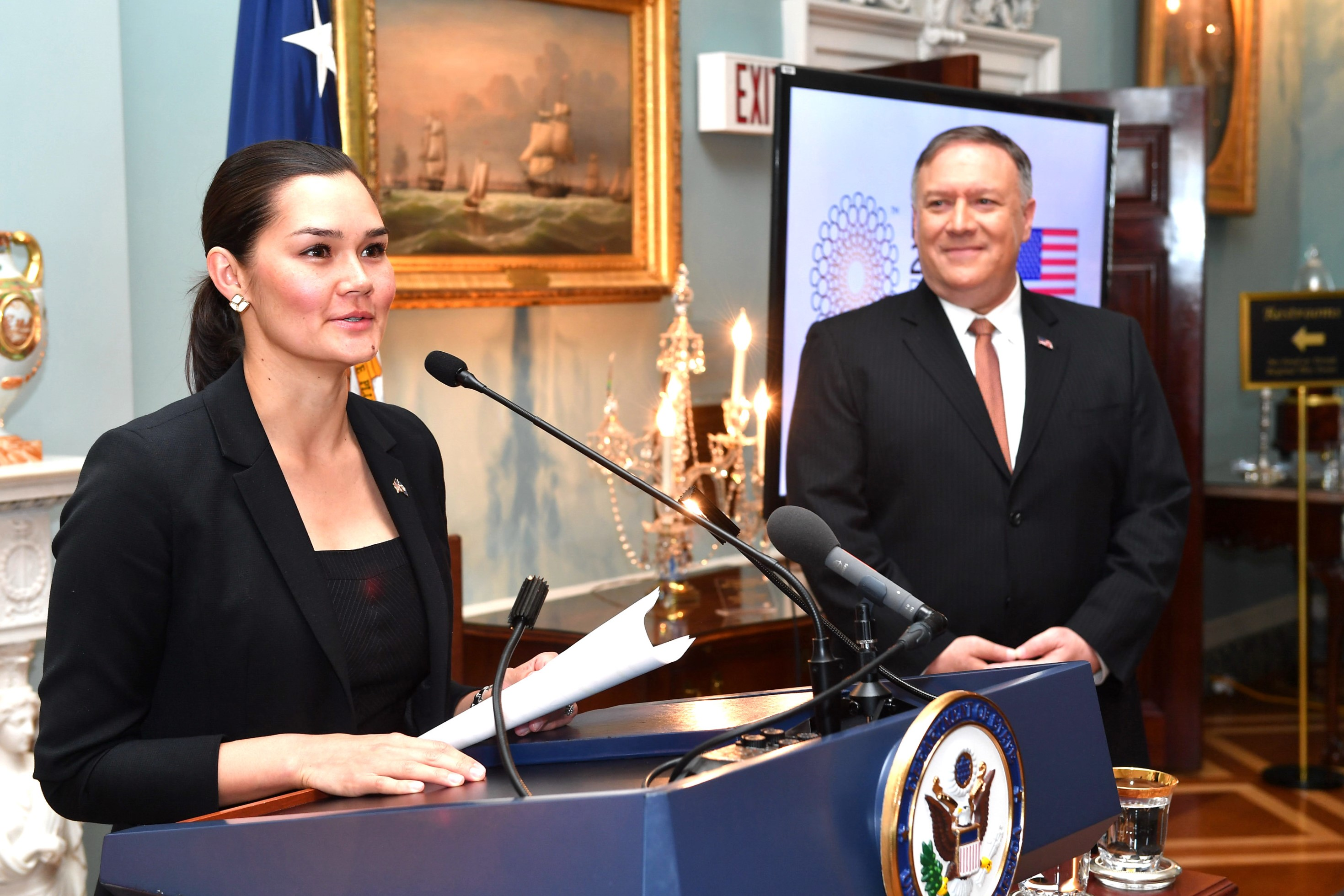
Giuda speaks with U.S. Secretary of State Michael R. Pompeo at a reception supporting the U.S. Pavilion at Expo 2020 at the U.S. Department of State in Washington, D.C., on July 29, 2019.

In 2018, Giuda was the Senior Vice President for Global Corporate Communications for Weber Shandwick, the youngest member of their 21-person Global Leadership Team. That year, the Asian American Business Development Center named her one of the "Outstanding 50 Asian Americans in Business."

Giuda was sworn in as United States Assistant Secretary of State for Public Affairs February 3, 2018. On February 12, 2019, she was appointed the acting Under Secretary of State for Public Diplomacy and Public Affairs. As acting Under Secretary, on May 28, 2019, Giuda merged the Bureau of Public Affairs and the Bureau of International Information Programs to form the Bureau of Global Public Affairs, and assumed the newly-formed position of Assistant Secretary of State for Global Public Affairs. She remained as acting Under Secretary until March 3, 2020, when Ulrich Brechbuhl took on the duties under delegation of authority.

In March 2020, Giuda became Executive Vice President of Geopolitical Strategy and Risk at Weber Shandwick.

Giuda joined the Krach Institute for Tech Diplomacy at Purdue in 2022 first as director, and then became its CEO.

In 2023, Giuda was nominated by President Biden to serve on the bipartisan International Broadcasting Advisory Board of the U.S. Agency for Global Media which was unanimously confirmed by the U.S. Senate.

Political offices
Preceded by Office established	Assistant Secretary of State for Global Public Affairs; 2019–2020	Succeeded by Aaron Ringel
Preceded by Susan Stevenson; Acting	Assistant Secretary of State for Public Affairs; 2018–2019	Succeeded by Office dissolved
