= Sarah B. Rogers =

American lawyer and diplomat

Sarah Rogers
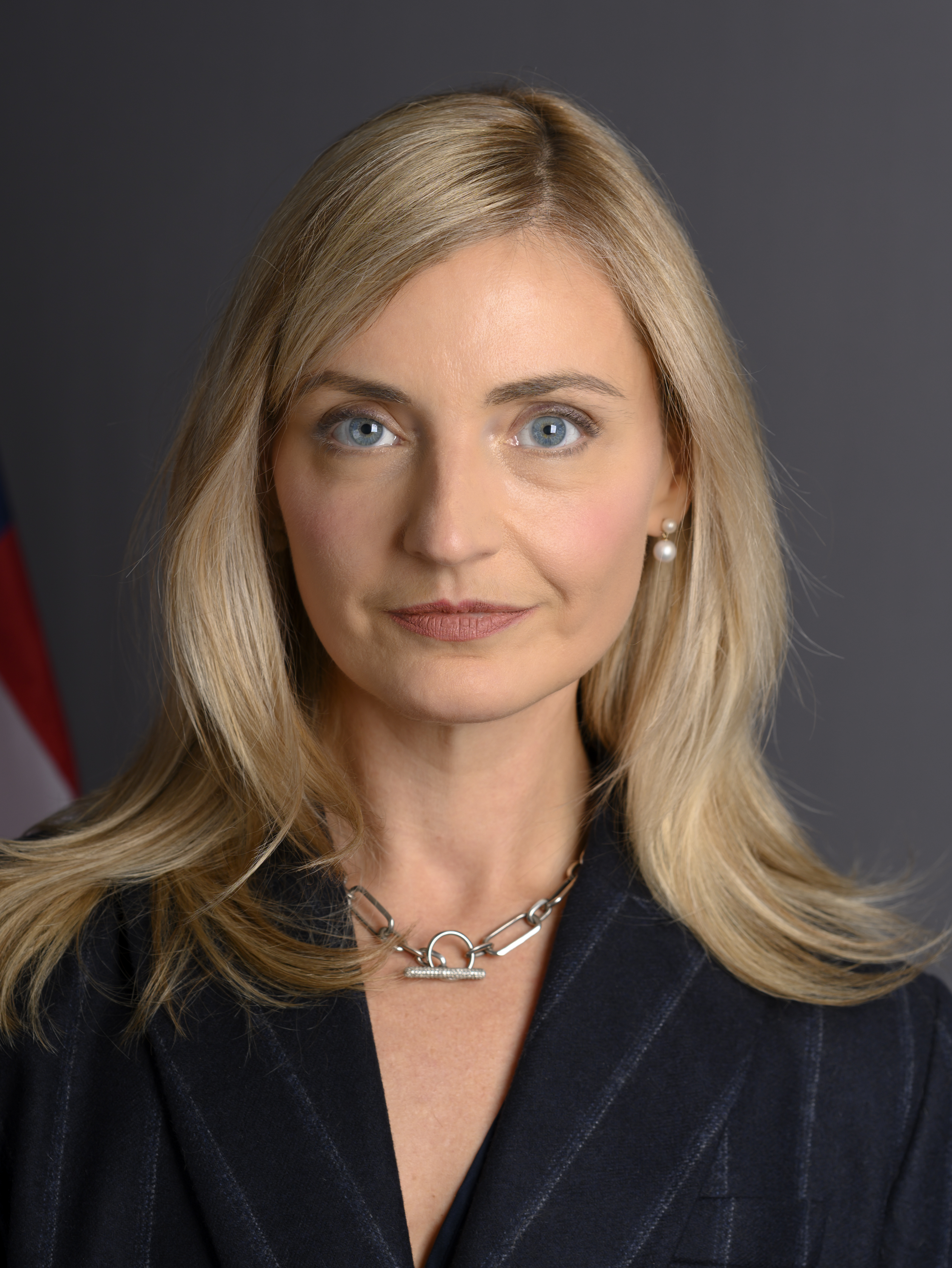
- Official portrait, 2025

CEO of the United States Agency for Global Media
- Nominee
- Assuming office TBD
- President: Donald Trump
- Succeeding: Michael Rigas (acting)

11th Under Secretary of State for Public Diplomacy and Public Affairs
- Incumbent
- Assumed office October 10, 2025
- President: Donald Trump
- Preceded by: Elizabeth M. Allen

Personal details
- Education: Dartmouth College (BA); Columbia University (JD)

Sarah Brooke Rogers is an American lawyer serving as the eleventh United States under secretary of state for public diplomacy and public affairs since October 10, 2025.

In March 2026, Rogers was nominated to become CEO of the U.S. Agency for Global Media, the parent agency of Voice of America.

== Early life and education ==
Rogers received her BA in international relations from Dartmouth College in 2005. She earned her JD from Columbia Law School in 2008, where she served as a staff editor of the Journal of Transnational Law and was recognized as a Harlan Fiske Stone Scholar. In 2003, while an undergraduate, she gained her first exposure to public diplomacy as an intern and Nelson Rockefeller fellow in the Bureau of International Information Programs at the U.S. Department of State.

== Legal career ==
After graduating with her JD, Rogers worked as an associate at Latham & Watkins LLP, where she represented clients in state, federal, and bankruptcy courts in a variety of commercial, securities, and insolvency-related litigation and regulatory matters. She also worked in-house for tobacco company Philip Morris International.

In May 2016, Rogers joined Brewer, Attorneys & Counselors in their New York City office as a senior associate and was promoted to partner in September 2025. She represented clients such as the National Rifle Association, major tobacco manufacturers, and investors and executives in the artificial intelligence (AI) industry.

She litigated a winning Supreme Court appeal in 2024 under the First Amendment, challenging the debanking of disfavored speakers by regulators in the case NRA v. Vullo. Rogers also spearheaded challenges to perceived social media censorship and weaponization of law enforcement, including the successful appeal of the wrongful conviction of Douglass Mackey and cases involving Charlie Kirk.

== Under secretary of state for public diplomacy and public affairs ==
Rogers was nominated by President Donald Trump on February 12, 2025, to be under secretary of state for public diplomacy and public affairs. She was confirmed by the Senate on October 7, 2025, and sworn in on October 10, 2025. In this role, she leads the Department of State's efforts to engage, inform, and understand foreign audiences, overseeing the Bureau of Educational and Cultural Affairs and the Bureau of Global Public Affairs.

Rogers has emphasized the use of public diplomacy to advance U.S. interests, including countering censorship, promoting free speech, and leveraging technology like AI for efficient messaging. She has highlighted initiatives such as exchange programs like Fulbright and engagement in events like Expo Osaka to build partnerships and showcase American excellence. Politico and The Guardian described her efforts and style as "Europe-baiting," inflammatory, and seeking to promote and ally with far-right European parties and interests.

In December 2025, Rogers recorded a viral video from a European hotel room, criticizing European and UK speech laws by reciting statements that had led to investigations or jail time in those regions. She accused the Global Disinformation Index of using U.S. taxpayer funds to promote censorship, leading to visa denials for five European individuals involved in tech regulation and disinformation efforts.

In January 2026, Rogers warned the UK government that "nothing is off the table" in response to threats to ban the social media platform X over AI-generated sexualized deepfakes.

Rogers has expressed concerns over global censorship trends, including Australia's proposed hate speech bill and mass arrests of pro-Palestinian supporters in the UK. Journalist Glenn Greenwald has called Rogers "a long-time, proven free speech defender as a principle, not a partisan tool." In a January 2026 interview, she discussed her views on free speech, tracing them back to her experiences with the early internet and as a prolific commenter on Gawker.

On January 28, 2026, Rogers spoke at the Meridian International Center's Insights@Meridian program, discussing public diplomacy's role in advancing democratic values and countering censorship.

Following a federal court ruling on March 7, 2026, that President Trump's appointment of Kari Lake to lead the U.S. Agency for Global Media—which oversees the Voice of America, a government-funded international news broadcaster—was invalid, Trump nominated Rogers to replace her.

In August 2026, Rogers was accused by right-wing activist Jennica Pounds of attempting to entrap her into publishing government secrets after Rogers sent Pounds documents on allegations of censorship under the presidency of Joe Biden. Rogers denied the claim and Pounds later said that she regretted "making a public spectacle". The controversy resulted in Pounds being exposed as having been secretly hired as a special government employee for the Department of Defense.

Describing her interpersonal and communicative style, reporters say Rogers is "very charismatic" and peers from her legal career have said "[s]he has a very motivating way of speaking and uses a lot of empathy" to persuade. Other have described her as having an inflammatory and blunt speaking style, which Politico argued had caused "sharp criticism from European officials" and "caused unease among U.S. officials and even some supporters".

Rogers has been sharply critical of British and EU policies on freedom of speech. In December 2025, her viral video led to accusations of interfering in European affairs. On January 15, 2026, quoting language for which a German lawmaker faced sanctions in the wake of the Cologne mass sexual assaults, she referred to the Cologne attackers as "barbarian rapist hordes." When an X user called "National Socialists of TikTok" replied and blamed Jews for German immigration policy, Rogers quote-tweeted that Germany "infamously retains very few Jews," yet imported the so-called "hordes" under Angela Merkel. Saying such speech was protected under the First Amendment, she singled out "Nazi conspiracy grievance ideology" saying that "it encourages self-victimization and magical thinking; it is, indeed, 'dumb trash.'"

During a speech with the London-based think tank the Prosperity Institute, Rogers drew controversy for her claims about COVID vaccines and the virus's origins and by saying that there are "average differences in IQ between racial groups." Politico described her claims as "contested" or lacking evidence.

In November 2026, The Washington Post reported that Rogers had taken a vacation to the Mediterranean paid for by Irish billionaire Patrick Collison. Rogers reported the trip on a preliminary annual financial disclosure form, and described Collison as a "pre-existing friend predating my government service" and said the trip was "for purposes of tourism," valuing the gift from Collison at $11,900 in the disclosure. State Department spokespeople told the Post that the trip was planned before Rogers' had been confirmed to her role, that she had properly disclosed the trip to relevant authorities, and that she had not participated in any government matter involving Collison's company Stripe.

== Personal life ==
Rogers married in 2009.
