= Task Force Pineapple =

American task force

Task Force Pineapple is a task force set up by a volunteer group of U.S. veterans to evacuate American citizens, as well as Afghan allies and their families, following the Taliban’s takeover of Afghanistan. As of 30 August 2021, the group had evacuated over 1,000 refugees.

== History ==
Task Force Pineapple was founded on 15 August 2021 by Scott Mann, a retired Green Beret, to rescue an Afghan commando he had served with. The commando was receiving death threats from the Taliban for having served alongside SEAL Team Six for a dozen years. After rescuing the commando and his family of six, the group began planning to rescue more people.

Communicating with each other via an encrypted chat room, a group of 50 Task Force Pineapple members collaborated with U.S. Special Forces and the U.S. embassy to rescue 500 more people on August 25 in a mission called "Pineapple Express". The slow and steady system of maneuvering the Afghan families in the darkness was modeled after the Underground Railroad. In order to confirm their identities, the refugees (referred to by the group as "passengers") had to show the volunteers a picture of yellow pineapples on a pink background. Task Force Pineapple members acted as "conductors"; they were led by former Green Beret Captain Zac Lois, who was the group's "engineer".

The group was planning the next stage of its week-long rescue operation when the suicide bombings at the Hamid Karzai International Airport occurred. Several of the task force's refugees were injured in the bomb blast or went missing. As of 30 August 2021, the group had evacuated over 1,000 refugees.
