= Frederick Vreeland =

American diplomat (1927–2026)

United States Ambassador to Morocco
- In office May 7, 1992 – March 1, 1993
- President: George H. W. Bush; Bill Clinton
- Preceded by: Michael Ussery
- Succeeded by: Marc Ginsberg

Vice President of John Cabot University
- In office 1989–1991

Personal details
- Born: June 24, 1927 Danbury, Connecticut, U.S.
- Died: January 25, 2026 (aged 98) Rome, Italy
- Party: Democrat
- Children: Nicholas Vreeland
- Parent: Diana Vreeland (mother)
- Education: Yale University (BA)

Military service
- Allegiance: United States
- Branch: United States Navy (Reserve)
- Service years: 1945–1947

Frederick Dalziel "Freck" Vreeland (June 24, 1927 – January 25, 2026) was an American career diplomat and writer whose final appointment was as United States Ambassador to Morocco.

== Life ==
The son of fashion editor Diana Vreeland (1903–1989) and the banker Thomas Reed Vreeland (1899–1966), Vreeland served in the United States Navy Reserve from 1945 to 1947, then was educated at Yale.

Vreeland died at his home in Rome, Italy, on January 25, 2026, at the age of 98.

== Career ==
In 1951 Vreeland became an Operations Officer with the Central Intelligence Agency and served until 1985. During that time, his foreign service diplomatic assignments were: Economic Officer, U.S. Mission to the UN European Office (1952–1957); Economic Officer, U.S. Mission to West Berlin (1957–1960); Political Officer, U.S. Embassy Bonn, West Germany (1960–1963); Member, National Security Council, at the White House (1963); Economic Officer, U.S. Embassy Rabat, Morocco (1963–1967); Political Officer, United States Mission to the United Nations (1967–1971); Political Officer, Embassy of the United States, Paris (1971–1978); and Political Officer, Embassy of the United States, Rome (1978–1985). He also served as Deputy Assistant Secretary of State for Near East/South Asia affairs between February 1991 and February 1992.

In the summer of 1963, he served temporarily as a member of the National Security Agency in Washington, DC., in order to brief U.S. President John F. Kennedy in preparation for the latter's visit to Berlin in June 1963. At Kennedy's request, during one of the last of these briefings, he invented the phrase "Ich bin ein Berliner" and carefully taught the president how to pronounce it in German. This is confirmed by the John F. Kennedy Presidential Library.

Vreeland was Vice President of John Cabot University from 1989 to 1991. In 1990, he was nominated by President George H. W. Bush as United States Ambassador to Burma, but his nomination was not acted upon by the United States Senate and he instead served as ambassador to Morocco, taking up the appointment in 1991.

Vreeland was part of a team of acting and public-speaking coaches assembled in Rome to prepare the inexperienced Sofia Coppola for a difficult scene in her father Francis's The Godfather Part III. In 2005, while living in retirement in Rome, Vreeland urged senators not to confirm John Bolton as U.S ambassador to the United Nations, saying he had no diplomatic bone in his body and was unworthy of their trust.

Diplomatic posts
Preceded by Michael Ussery	U.S. Ambassador to Morocco; May 7, 1992 – March 1, 1993	Succeeded by Marc Ginsberg
