= Thomas T. Riley =

American diplomat

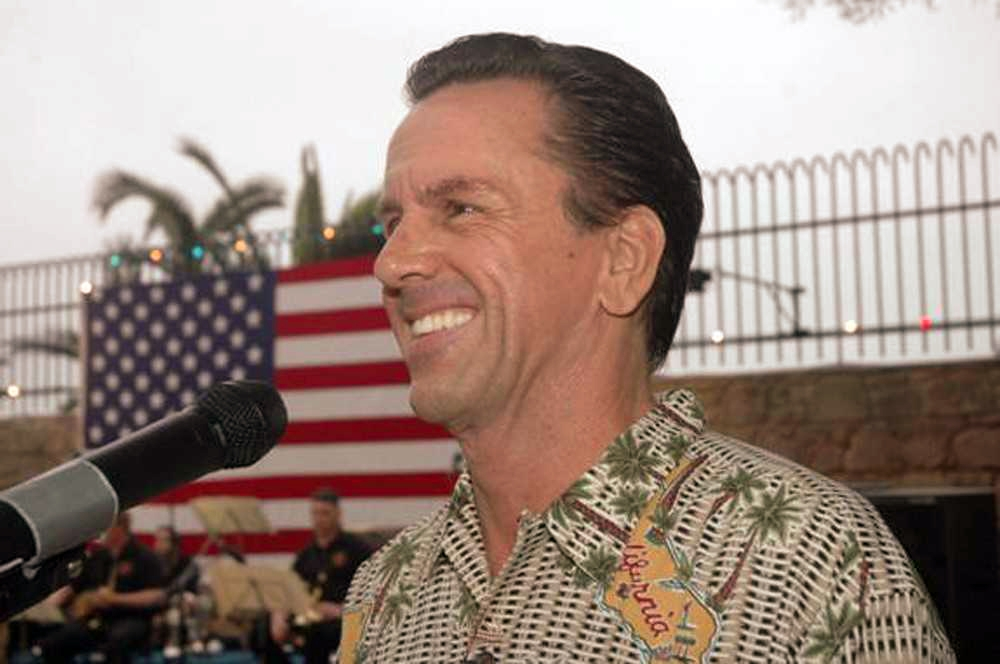

United States Ambassador to Morocco
- In office December 21, 2003 – January 2009
- President: George W. Bush
- Preceded by: Margaret D. Tutwiler
- Succeeded by: Samuel L. Kaplan

Personal details
- Born: San Mateo, California, USA
- Spouse: Nancy Vieira da Rosa Riley
- Profession: Businessman

Thomas Thomas Riley was the United States Ambassador to Morocco for 5 years. He was sworn in on December 21, 2003, and arrived at his post in January 2004. King Mohammed VI awarded Ambassador Riley the "Grand Croix du Ordre du Ouissam El Alaouite" (Grand Cross of the Order of Ouissam Alaouite). In January 2009 following the inauguration of a new President, all Ambassadors automatically tender their resignations. Ambassador Riley was selected as the recipient of the State Department's 2009 Sue M. Cobb Award for Exemplary Diplomatic Service, the only award given by the State Department to a political-appointee Ambassador. Thomas Riley was Senior VP and Managing Director International for Savvis, Inc. until 2011. He then joined BrightSource Energy, an Oakland, California-based global provider of utility scale solar technology, as senior adviser for International business development.

== Early life ==
Riley was born in San Mateo, California. After receiving his BS in Industrial Engineering from Stanford University, he worked as an engineer at Boeing for one year. Riley then attended Harvard Business School where he received his MBA, and then went on to work at TRW Mission in London and Paris.

He returned to the US after 4 years and cofounded a company selling construction equipment to East Africa (Somalia, Kenya, Djibouti, Sudan). In 1984, he began an almost 20-year career in Silicon Valley, as Product Manager for an advanced electric utility meter at Robinton Products; as president of Unity Systems, manufacturer of an automated home and building control system; as founder and president of Web State, an online training company; and as president of ActivePhoto, an online digital image service.

Riley is the holder of United States Patent 5303767 for an energy management system.

Riley is married to Nancy Vieira da Rosa Riley, a former tax attorney and author of the children's book "Moroccan Mystery".

Diplomatic posts
Preceded by Margaret D. Tutwiler	United States Ambassador to Morocco; 2003–2009	Succeeded by Samuel L. Kaplan
