= List of ambassadors of the United States to Morocco =

Ambassador of the United States to Morocco
- Seal of the United States Department of State

- Flag of a United States ambassador

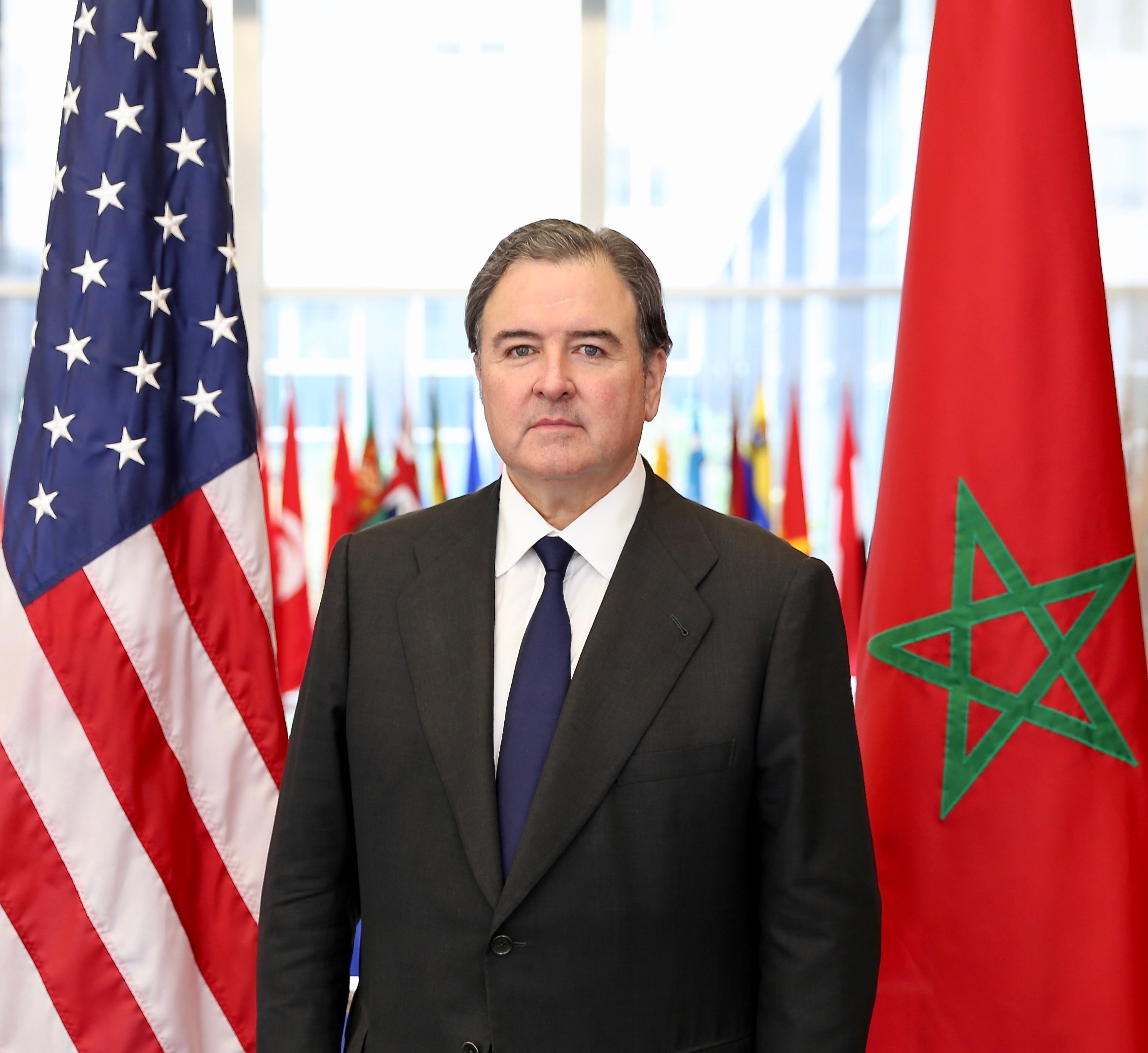
- Incumbent; Duke Buchan since December 2, 2025
- Nominator: The president of the United States
- Appointer: The president with Senate advice and consent
- Inaugural holder: James Simpson as Consul
- Formation: 1797
- Website: U.S. Embassy - Rabat

This is a list of ambassadors of the United States to Morocco. Morocco was the first country to recognize the United States of America in 1777. James Simpson was appointed the first U.S. consul, and arrived on December 7, 1797, at Tangier to assume his duties and establish the U.S. consulate. Simpson served for over twenty years, until his death on March 8, 1820. In 1821, as a gift to the United States, Sultan Moulay Suleiman gave a building for the consulate’s use, which was the first property abroad owned by the United States. The building is now the Tangier American Legation Institute for Moroccan Studies (TALIM). In 1912 Morocco came under France and Spain as protectorates. The United States did not initially recognize the French and Spanish protectorates over Morocco. However, in 1917 upon U.S. entry into the First World War, the U.S. government recognized the protectorates. The U.S. Minister at Tangier was downgraded to the status of Diplomatic Agent. In 1956 the U.S. recognized Morocco’s independence, established an embassy in Rabat, and appointed a ranking ambassador, Cavendish W. Cannon.

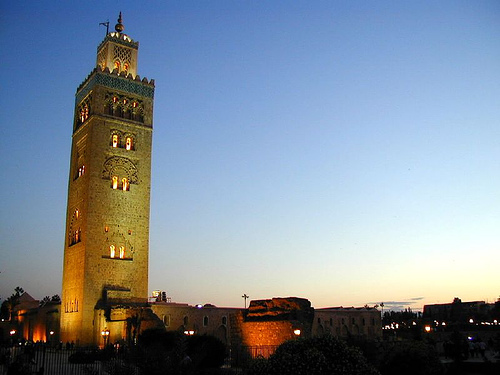
Koutoubia Mosque in Marrakesh, Morocco

== Heads of the U.S. Legation at Tangier (1906–1917) ==
Name	Title	Start	End
Samuel R. Gummere	Envoy	1906	1909
Henry Percival Dodge	Envoy	1909	1910
Fred W. Carpenter	Envoy	1910	1912
Maxwell Blake	Chargé d'Affaires	1912	1917

== Heads of the U.S. Consulate General at Tangier (1917–1933) ==
Name	Title	Start	End
Maxwell Blake	Consul General	1917	1922
Joseph M. Denning	Consul General	1922	1924
Maxwell Blake	Consul General	1925	1933

== Heads of the U.S. Legation at Tangier (1933–1956) ==
Name	Title	Start	End
Maxwell Blake	Consul General	1933	1940
John Campbell White	Consul General	1940	1941
J. Rives Childs	Chargé d'Affaires	1941	1945
Paul H. Alling	Consul General	1945	1947
Edwin A. Plitt	Consul General	1947	1951
John Carter Vincent	Consul General	1951	1953
Joseph C. Satterthwaite	Consul General	1953	1955
Julius C. Holmes	Consul General	1955	1956

== Heads of the U.S. Embassy at Rabat (1956–present) ==
Name	Title	Start	End
William J. Porter	Chargé d'Affaires	1956	1956
Cavendish W. Cannon	Ambassador	1956	1958
Charles Yost	Ambassador	1958	1961
Philip W. Bonsal	Ambassador	1961	1962
John H. Ferguson	Ambassador	1962	1964
Henry J. Tasca	Ambassador	1965	1969
Stuart W. Rockwell	Ambassador	1970	1973
Robert G. Neumann	Ambassador	1973	1976
Robert Anderson	Ambassador	1976	1978
Richard B. Parker	Ambassador	1978	1979
Angier Biddle Duke	Ambassador	1979	1981
Joseph Verner Reed Jr.	Ambassador	1981	1985
Thomas Anthony Nassif	Ambassador	1985	1988
Michael Ussery	Ambassador	1988	1992
Frederick Vreeland	Ambassador	1992	1993
Marc Charles Ginsberg	Ambassador	1994	1997
Gary S. Usrey	Chargé d'Affaires	1997	1998
Edward M. Gabriel	Ambassador	1998	2001
Margaret D. Tutwiler	Ambassador	2001	2003
Thomas Riley	Ambassador	2004	2009
Samuel L. Kaplan	Ambassador	2009	2013
Matthew Lussenhop	Chargé d'Affaires	2013	2014
Dwight L. Bush Sr.	Ambassador	2014	2017
Stephanie Miley	Chargé d'Affaires	2017	2019
David Greene	Chargé d'Affaires	2019	2020
David T. Fischer	Ambassador	2020	2021
David Greene	Chargé d'Affaires	2021	2022
Aimee Cutrona	Chargé d'Affaires	2022	2022
Puneet Talwar	Ambassador	2022	2025
Aimee Cutrona	Chargé d'Affaires	2025	2025
Ben Ziff	Chargé d'Affaires	2025	2025
Duke Buchan	Ambassador	2025	Incumbent

== See also ==
- Morocco – United States relations
- Foreign relations of Morocco
- Ambassadors of the United States
