= Marc C. Ginsberg =

American lawyer and diplomat (born 1950)

Marc Ginsberg
- Born: Marc Charles Ginsberg; October 18, 1950 (age 76); New York City, New York, U.S.
- Education: American University (B.A.); Georgetown University (M.B.A. [candidate] & J.D.)
- Occupations: Former US ambassador, presidential advisor, corporate lawyer, domestic and foreign cyber-counter terrorism expert
- Website: www.coalitionsw.org

Marc Charles Ginsberg (born October 18, 1950) is a U.S. lawyer and former diplomat who currently leads The Coalition for a Safer Web, a non-profit dedicated to combating cyber terrorism and extremist incitement.

== Early life ==
Ginsberg was born in 1950 in New York City, and from 1960 to 1968 was raised in Israel, Egypt, Jordan and Lebanon. He fluently speaks English, Hebrew, Arabic, and French. He earned a B.A. degree from American University and was a M.B.A. candidate at Georgetown University before earning a J.D. from Georgetown University Law Center in 1978.

== Career ==
As a college freshman in 1971, Ginsberg began serving as a legislative assistant to Senator Edward Kennedy when he chaired the Senate Subcommittee on Refugees until 1977.

In 1977, the United States Secretary of State (Cyrus Vance) appointed Ginsberg to serve as White House Liaison and Chief of Staff to Presidential Special Envoy (Gov. Averell Harriman).

Under President Jimmy Carter, from 1979 to 1981, Ginsberg was the Deputy Senior Advisor to the President for Middle East Policy and served on the post-Camp David Palestinian Autonomy Negotiations headed by Ambassador Robert Strauss and Ambassador Sol Linowitz.

In 1994, President Bill Clinton appointed Ginsberg as Ambassador to Morocco, making Ginsberg the first Jewish American to be appointed as an ambassador to a country in the Arab world. Ginsberg was the first United States diplomat to Morocco to be awarded the Highest Order of Ouissam Alaouite by Hassan II, the king of Morocco at that time.

Between 1998 and 1999, Ginsberg served as the United States Special Coordinator for Mediterranean Trade, Investment, and Security Affairs.

Ginsberg has worked as a reviewer of United States foreign and economic policy for groups such as the Council on Foreign Relations and the Brookings Institution.

From 2000 to 2012, Ginsberg served as senior vice president and managing director of APCO Worldwide, a global corporate public affairs and communication consultancy. Ginsberg coordinated strategic client relationships and business planning throughout the Middle East.

Ginsberg was co-founder and served as President of Layalina Productions, the first United States organization to produce non-profit Arabic-language television for the Arabic world. Layalina has two headquarters located in Washington, D.C. and Amman, Jordan.

Ginsberg served a two-year term on the board of directors of the AARP Foundation from 2009 to 2011.

In 2013, Ginsberg became chief executive officer of the One Voice Movement Foundation and Chief Executive Officer of Peaceworks, LLC. With offices in Israel, Palestine, the United Kingdom, and the United States, the One Voice Movement fosters grassroots advocacy among the next generation of Israelis and Palestinians to promote a two-state solution to the Arab–Israeli conflict.

From 2017-2019 Ginsberg served as an adviser to Middle East and European governments to interdict Al Qaeda and Islamic State social media-based terrorist and recruitment operations, and as a consultant (Senior Global Director) for the Counter Extremism Project based in Washington, D.C.

In 2019, Ginsberg founded the Coalition for a Safer Web, a cyber counter-terrorism and anti-extremism non-profit organization whose mission is to prevent social media platforms from serving as pathways for extremists and terrorists to plot, incite, and execute domestic and foreign acts of violence. The Coalition for a Safer Web currently advises Congress, the Department of Homeland Security, the Department of Defense, and the National Security Council on social media-based extremist incitement and operational planning, as well as private industry and civil society organizations.

Ginsberg regularly contributes articles to periodicals such as The Washington Post, the Wall Street Journal, the Financial Times, The Hill, the International New York Times, the Baltimore Sun, and the Diplomatic Courier. He appears regularly on C-SPAN, CNN, CNBC, WTOP Radio (Washington, DC), as well as Middle East and European media outlets. Ginsberg also served as an on-air contributor to the Netflix television series Terrorism's Close Calls.

Diplomatic posts
Preceded by Frederick Vreeland	U.S. Ambassador to Morocco; 1994–1998	Succeeded by Edward M. Gabriel
