= John M. Steeves =

American diplomat

10th Director General of the Foreign Service
- In office August 1, 1966 – July 31, 1969
- Preceded by: Joseph Palmer II
- Succeeded by: John Howard Burns

10th United States Ambassador to Afghanistan
- In office February 7, 1962 – March 20, 1962
- Preceded by: Henry A. Byroade
- Succeeded by: Robert G. Neumann

Personal details
- Born: May 6, 1905 Brinsmade, North Dakota, U.S.
- Died: October 1, 1998 (aged 93) Mechanicsburg, Pennsylvania, U.S.

John Milton Steeves (May 6, 1905 – October 1, 1998) was an American career diplomat who served as Deputy Assistant Secretary of State for Far Eastern Affairs from 1959 to 1962; Ambassador to Afghanistan from 1962 to 1966; and Director General of the Foreign Service from 1966 to 1969.

== Early life ==
Steeves was born in Brinsmade, North Dakota in 1905. His ancestors were German immigrants from Osnabruck who immigrated to North America and eventually settled in New Brunswick, Canada. John Steeves father relocated to North Dakota as a young man, lured by the promise of the North Dakota Homestead Act, and acquired property in the Devils Lake area. Later, when John Steeves was still a child, the family moved again to establish a homestead in northern Alberta.

After his mother died, John Steeves returned to the United States with his father, brother and sister and settled in Washington state. There, he attended a Seventh-day Adventist college, and then served as an educational missionary in India, Burma, and Ceylon.

== Military service ==
By the time of the Second World War, Steeves had grown "somewhat disillusioned" with some aspects of missionary work, and decided to move back to the United States to serve the war effort. Steeves joined the armed services and was posted to the Psychological Warfare unit of the Office of War Information—a predecessor to the United States Information Agency. He was given the rank of Colonel, and appointed to the Chinese-Burma-India theater.

== Diplomatic career ==
Following the Second World War, Steeves became a career diplomat. He served as a political counselor at the U.S. Embassy in Tokyo from 1951 to 1953. He was acting Ambassador to Jakarta, Indonesia, and then returned to Japan as Consul General in the Ryukyu Islands from 1955 to 1956. He was Deputy Assistant Secretary of State for Far Eastern Affairs from 1959 to 1962, and subsequently was made Ambassador to Afghanistan from 1962 to 1966. Upon his return from Afghanistan, Steeves served as Director General of the American Foreign Service from 1966 to 1969. He died in Mechanicsburg, Pennsylvania in 1998.

Diplomatic posts
Preceded by Henry A. Byroade	United States Ambassador to Afghanistan; 1962–1966	Succeeded by Robert G. Neumann
