= Robert G. Neumann =

American diplomat (1916–1999)

United States Ambassador to Saudi Arabia
- In office June 22, 1981 – July 16, 1981
- President: Ronald Reagan
- Preceded by: John C. West
- Succeeded by: Richard W. Murphy

United States Ambassador to Morocco
- In office October 30, 1973 – March 11, 1976
- President: Richard Nixon; Gerald Ford
- Preceded by: Stuart W. Rockwell
- Succeeded by: Robert Anderson

11th United States Ambassador to Afghanistan
- In office February 19, 1967 – September 10, 1973
- President: Lyndon B. Johnson; Richard Nixon
- Preceded by: John M. Steeves
- Succeeded by: Theodore L. Eliot, Jr.

Personal details
- Born: Robert Gerhard Neumann; January 2, 1916 Vienna, Austria
- Died: June 18, 1999 (aged 83) Bethesda, Maryland, U.S.
- Party: Republican
- Children: Ronald E. Neumann, Gregory W. Neumann
- Education: University of Michigan
- Profession: Diplomat, Professor

Robert Gerhard Neumann (January 2, 1916 – June 18, 1999) was an American politician and diplomat who served as the U.S. ambassador to Afghanistan, Morocco, and Saudi Arabia.

== Biography ==
Born in Vienna, Austria, Neumann received degrees from the University of Rennes, the Consular Academy of Austria, the Graduate Institute of International and Development Studies in Geneva, Switzerland (formerly Institut universitaire de hautes études internationales, HEI) and the University of Michigan (Ph.D. 1946). During his studies in Geneva, Neumann was arrested by the Nazis and spent two years in a concentration camp. Upon his release, he left for America, where in 1940 he received a Master of Arts from Amherst College.

After a brief stint teaching at the State Teachers' College in Oshkosh, Wisconsin, Neumann enlisted and served during World War II. Upon his return, he took up a job teaching political science at the University of Wisconsin–Madison. In 1946 he earned his Ph.D. from the University of Minnesota.

The following year he took a post at the University of California at Los Angeles, where he eventually became a tenured professor.

== Diplomatic career ==
In 1966 he was named by President Lyndon B. Johnson as ambassador to Afghanistan. At the time, the position was not necessarily a permanent one, and Neumann was granted a leave of absence from UCLA. However, by 1970, Neumann felt compelled to remain at work at the Embassy, and resigned his professorship at the school.

After serving in Afghanistan, Neumann became the ambassador to Morocco in 1973. Upon his return to Washington, D.C. in 1976, he began teaching again at Georgetown University, while taking the director's helm of the Institute for the Study of Diplomacy.

In 1981, Neumann was once again called into the diplomatic community, this time as Ronald Reagan's ambassador to Saudi Arabia. However, he abruptly resigned that same year due to a personal conflict with then-Secretary of State Alexander Haig. He remained a fellow at Georgetown University until his retirement in the early 1990s.

== Personal life and death ==
Neumann died in Bethesda, Maryland on June 18, 1999, at the age of 83.

His son, Ronald E. Neumann, also became an American ambassador and a deputy assistant secretary of state.

Diplomatic posts
Preceded by John M. Steeves	United States Ambassador to Afghanistan; 1966 – 1973	Succeeded by Theodore L. Eliot, Jr.
Preceded by Stuart W. Rockwell	United States Ambassador to Morocco; 1973 – 1974	Succeeded by Robert Anderson
Preceded by John Carl West	United States Ambassador to Saudi Arabia; 1981	Succeeded by Richard W. Murphy
