= Margaret D. Tutwiler =

American politician (born 1950)

Margaret Tutwiler
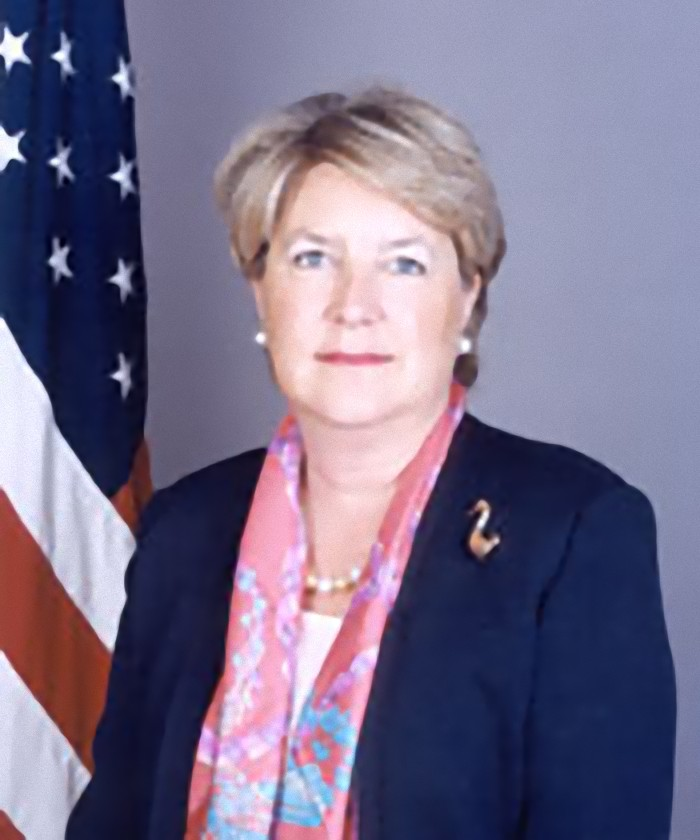

3rd Under Secretary of State for Public Diplomacy and Public Affairs
- In office December 16, 2003 – June 16, 2004
- President: George W. Bush
- Preceded by: Charlotte Beers
- Succeeded by: Karen Hughes

United States Ambassador to Morocco
- In office August 7, 2001 – August 22, 2003
- President: George W. Bush
- Preceded by: Edward M. Gabriel
- Succeeded by: Thomas T. Riley

White House Communications Director
- In office August 23, 1992 – January 20, 1993
- President: George H. W. Bush
- Preceded by: David Demarest
- Succeeded by: George Stephanopoulos

21st Assistant Secretary of State for Public Affairs
- In office March 3, 1989 – August 23, 1992
- President: George H. W. Bush
- Preceded by: Charles E. Redman
- Succeeded by: Thomas E. Donilon

13th Spokesperson for the United States Department of State
- In office March 3, 1989 – August 23, 1992
- President: George H. W. Bush
- Preceded by: Charles E. Redman
- Succeeded by: Richard Boucher

White House Director of Political Affairs
- Acting
- In office July 23, 1984 – February 5, 1985
- President: Ronald Reagan
- Preceded by: Ed Rollins
- Succeeded by: Ed Rollins (Political and Intergovernmental Affairs); Bill Lacy

Personal details
- Born: Margaret DeBardeleben Tutwiler; December 28, 1950 (age 75) Birmingham, Alabama, U.S.
- Party: Republican
- Education: Finch College (attended); University of Alabama (BA)

Margaret DeBardeleben Tutwiler (born December 28, 1950) is an American politician who has served multiple different positions within the United States Department of State.

== Early life and career ==
Tutwiler was born in Birmingham, Alabama, the daughter of Temple Tutwiler II and Margaret (DeBardeleben) Tutwiler. She attended Finch College in Manhattan and the University of Alabama. She was offered a job as the secretary of the chairman of the Alabama Republican Party following her graduation.

At age 26, she worked under James A. Baker III in Gerald Ford’s unsuccessful 1976 presidential campaign. In 1980, she was one of a team of relatively younger aides assembled by Baker to run Bush’s campaign for the presidential nomination. When Bush lost the nomination to Ronald Reagan, Reagan tapped Baker to run his presidential campaign, and Baker brought Tutwiler with him to the campaign.

== Reagan White House ==
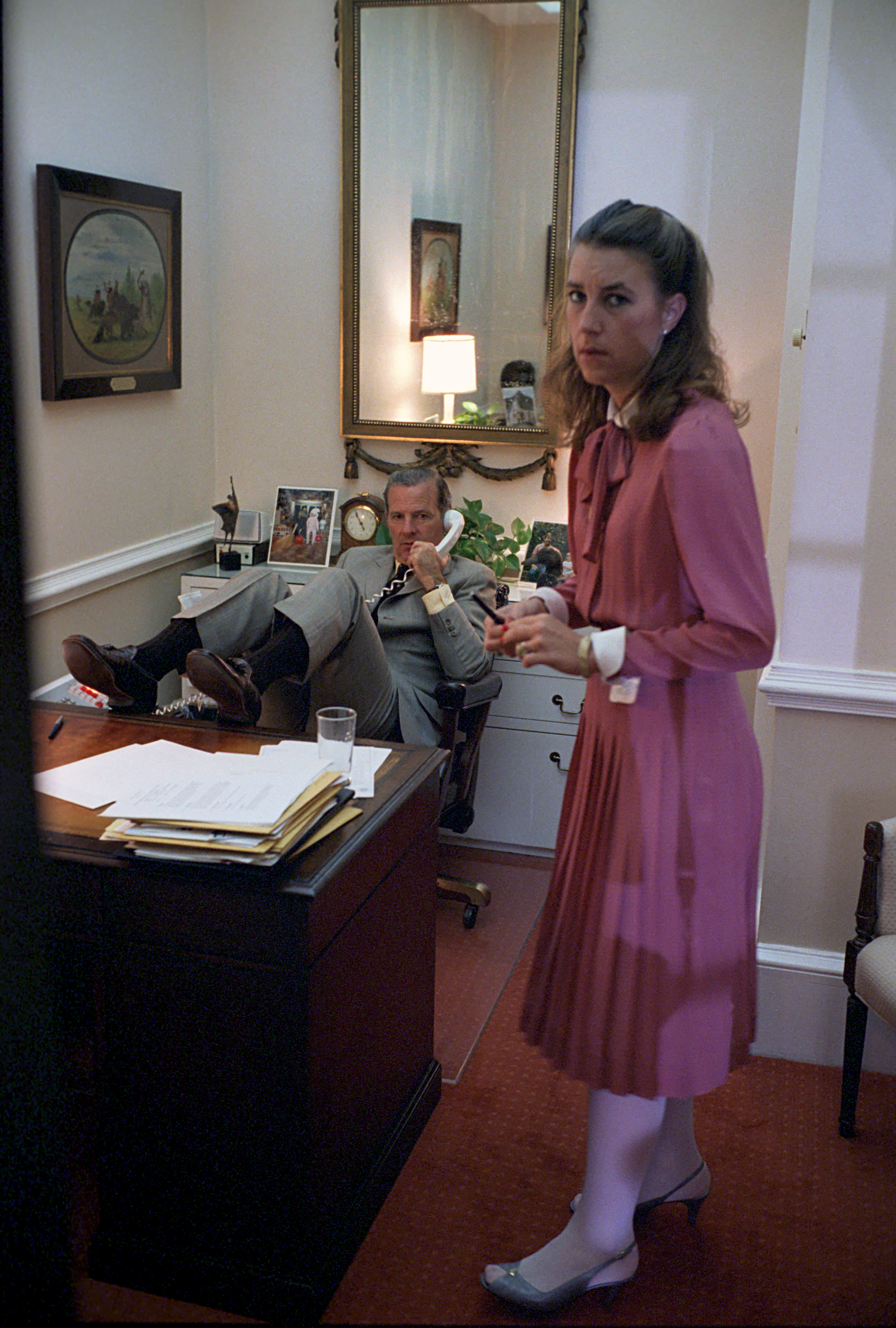
Tutwiler (right) standing next to White House Chief of Staff James Baker (left), while he speaks on the phone.

When Reagan won the presidency and Baker became White House Chief of Staff, Tutwiler asked to accompany him, saying, "Until we figure it out, can’t I just be your jack of all trades?" Once they were ensconced in the White House, one of Tutwiler's duties was to return phone calls from members of Congress, or the press, if Baker could not himself return the call.

Gradually, Tutwiler became known as Baker's right hand and alter ego. In the run-up to the 1984 election, Baker installed Tutwiler as liaison at Reagan's re-election campaign, in part to keep an eye on Ed Rollins, who had left his position as Assistant to the President for Political Affairs and became chair of the campaign, and who was critical of Baker.

In January 1985, after Reagan won the 1984 election, he appointed Baker as Secretary of the Treasury, and Baker took his White House team with him to the Treasury, where Tutwiler became Baker's chief political assistant, initially holding the position of Assistant Secretary For Public Affairs.

== H.W. Bush White House ==
In 1989, after George H. W. Bush was elected president, Baker became Secretary of State, and Tutwiler moved with him to the State Department as Assistant Secretary of State for Public Affairs—although she had to be convinced to take the position, because it involved daily briefings on matters with which she was not yet familiar.

In June 1989, when protests erupted in Beijing's Tiananmen Square, the Bush administration was concerned that a strong condemnation from the U.S. might damage the rapprochement with China which had begun during the Nixon administration, and impair the ability of the U.S. to use China as a counterweight in its geopolitical struggle with the Soviet Union. As Assistant Secretary for Public Affairs, Tutwiler was in charge of press and public briefings conducted by the State Department's Bureau of Public Affairs. She objected to the administration's position regarding the protests, and urged Baker to speak out against the Chinese government's crackdown on protesters. Initially, she refused to conduct briefings supporting the administration's position. To overcome her scruples, Baker had to personally insist that she conduct the briefings.

It was Tutwiler who urged Baker to invite Soviet Foreign Minister Eduard Shevardnadze to accompany him on a trip to his ranch in Wyoming, which would provide an opportunity for the two men to become better acquainted. The trip took place in September, 1989.

President Bush met Soviet General Secretary Mikhail Gorbachev for a summit in Malta on December 2–3, 1989. Tutwiler was part of the State Department party who travelled to Malta for the summit.

On August 13, 1992, President Bush announced that Baker was leaving the State Department, and returning to the White House as White House Chief of Staff, and would run Bush's re-election campaign. Tutwiler was one of the advisers who moved back to the White House with him. After Bush lost his bid for re-election, William Barr, then the Attorney General, appointed a special prosecutor to investigate whether the Bush campaign had sought information from Bill Clinton's passport files. No charges were filed, but Tutwiler and other aides had to find lawyers to represent them during the investigation.

In 1996, Baker considered running for president against Clinton. One of the people from whom he sought advice on whether to run was Tutwiler. Tutwiler also read and critiqued drafts of Baker's memoir.

== 2000 election and W. Bush White House ==
When the result of the 2000 United States presidential election in Florida was in doubt, Baker became the head of the George W. Bush's legal team in the state. One of the first things Baker did was to phone Tutwiler and ask her to mobilize his aides and go to Florida. Tutwiler was installed in a corner office near Baker's office in the state Republican Party building.

On August 25, 2002, prior to the second Iraq war, the New York Times published a column by Baker urging the President to seek a United Nations Security Council resolution authorizing the use of force to compel Iraq to submit to international inspection. Tutwiler urged Baker to take a harder line against a war, but Baker declined to publicly criticize the approach taken by the White House.

During the administration of George W. Bush, Tutwiler was Ambassador to Morocco from March 2001 until 2003, when she became Under Secretary for Public Diplomacy and Public Affairs, serving from December 16, 2003, to June 30, 2004. She was confirmed by the U.S. Senate on December 9, 2003, to replace outgoing Under Secretary Charlotte Beers. Tutwiler was given the task of leading "the government's public-relations drive to build a favorable impression abroad."

== Private sector work ==
In July 2004, she began directing communications for NYSE Euronext. Her boss at the NYSE, John Thain, later brought her on board as head of communications at Merrill Lynch in December 2007 and then at CIT Group in August 2010.

Tutwiler is a member of the board of directors of the International Republican Institute.

Political offices
| Preceded by Ed Rollins | White House Director of Political Affairs; Acting; 1984–1985 | Succeeded by Ed Rollins as White House Director of Political and Intergovernmental Affairs |
| Preceded by Ed Rollins | White House Director of Political Affairs; Acting; 1984–1985 | Succeeded by Bill Lacy |
| Preceded by Charles Redman | Spokesperson for the United States Department of State; 1989–1992 | Succeeded by Richard Boucher |
| Preceded by Charles Redman | Assistant Secretary of State for Public Affairs; 1989–1992 | Succeeded by Tom Donilon |
| Preceded by David Demarest | White House Director of Communications; 1992–1993 | Succeeded by George Stephanopoulos |
| Preceded by Charlotte Beers | Under Secretary of State for Public Diplomacy and Public Affairs; 2003–2004 | Succeeded by Karen Hughes |
Diplomatic posts
| Preceded by Edward Gabriel | United States Ambassador to Morocco; 2001–2003 | Succeeded by Thomas Riley |
