= Eric Beach (political consultant) =

Political strategist, Businessman, Investor

- Occupations: Great America PAC, Chairman. OneTeam Sports
- Known for: Veteran Republican Strategist, Businessman
- Political party: Republican
- Partner: Leigh Beach
- Website: https://www.greatamericapac.com/

Eric L. Beach is an investor, businessman, philanthropist and political consultant. He is a central player in the LA Times new media venture Next, helping to craft the strategic vision to take the company public in an innovative way. Beach was an owner of OneTeam Youth, under Redbird Capital, the National Football League Players Association (NFLPA), and the Major League Baseball Association (MLBPA), known as OneTeam Partners. Beach joined OneTeam when the investment management firm acquired Under the Lights Flag Football, which Beach founded with Under Armour, in 2021. OneTeam was then acquired by multi-billionaire Josh Harris and Unrivalled Sports in 2024. Beach is a former Republican political strategist and consultant based out of Maryland and Florida. He served as the co-chair for the pro-Donald Trump Great America PAC, along with Ed Rollins. Beach has previously worked for presidential campaigns of Rand Paul, Newt Gingrich, and Rudy Giuliani, as well as for Arnold Schwarzenegger's 2003 campaign for Governor of California. Eric was a former 40 under 40 winner and founded a charity called Brothers in Arms Foundation in 2012.

== Early life and education ==
Beach was born in raised in Maryland, just outside of Washington, D.C., where his father was a firefighter. Beach attended Towson University where he was a member of the football team, student body president for two years, and received the man of the year award. He obtained a master's degree in political science from George Washington University.

== Political career ==
Beach is a veteran political operative, having served on many high-profile campaigns. Beach was the co-chair of the pro-Donald Trump Great America PAC, along with former Ronald Reagan campaign manager, Ed Rollins.

Prior to joining the Great America PAC, Beach served as national finance chairman for Kentucky Senator Rand Paul's 2016 presidential campaign. Beach also served a national finance chairman for former Speaker of the House Newt Gingrich's 2012 presidential campaign.

In 2008, Beach served as the state finance leader, in California, for Rudy Giuliani's presidential bid. Beach has also served as national finance chairman for the Tea Party Express, travel aide for Bill Jones' 2004 U.S. Senate campaign in California, and as a member of Arnold Schwarzenegger's 2003 campaign team.

Beach was brought in to run the Great America PAC in March 2016.

== Other activities ==
Beach founded Brothers in Arms, a nonprofit public benefit corporation which organizes the annual Brothers in Arms Classic, a sporting event that brings together high school football teams from around the country to raise awareness for those serving in the military and to raise money. Brothers in Arms makes donations to other charitable organizations that provide "educational opportunities and financial assistance for [armed forces] members, heroic community servants, and their families."
