= Fred Thompson 2008 presidential campaign =

Bid for Republican Party nomination

Fred Thompson for President 2008
- Campaign: U.S. presidential election, 2008
- Candidate: Fred Thompson; U.S. Senator from Tennessee (1994–2003)
- Affiliation: Republican Party
- Status: Withdrawn
- EC formed: June 1, 2007
- Announced: September 5, 2007
- Launched: September 5, 2007
- Suspended: January 22, 2008
- Headquarters: Nashville, Tennessee
- Key people: Bill Lacy (campaign manager)
- Slogan: Security · Unity · Prosperity

Website
- fred08.com (archived - March 9, 2007)

The 2008 presidential campaign of Fred Thompson, lawyer, lobbyist, character actor and former senator from Tennessee, began on September 5, 2007, after six months of speculation. He was a Republican Party primary candidate seeking to represent his party in the 2008 United States presidential election. His campaign ended on January 22, 2008, following a third-place finish in the South Carolina primary.

== Campaign development ==
=== Prelude ===
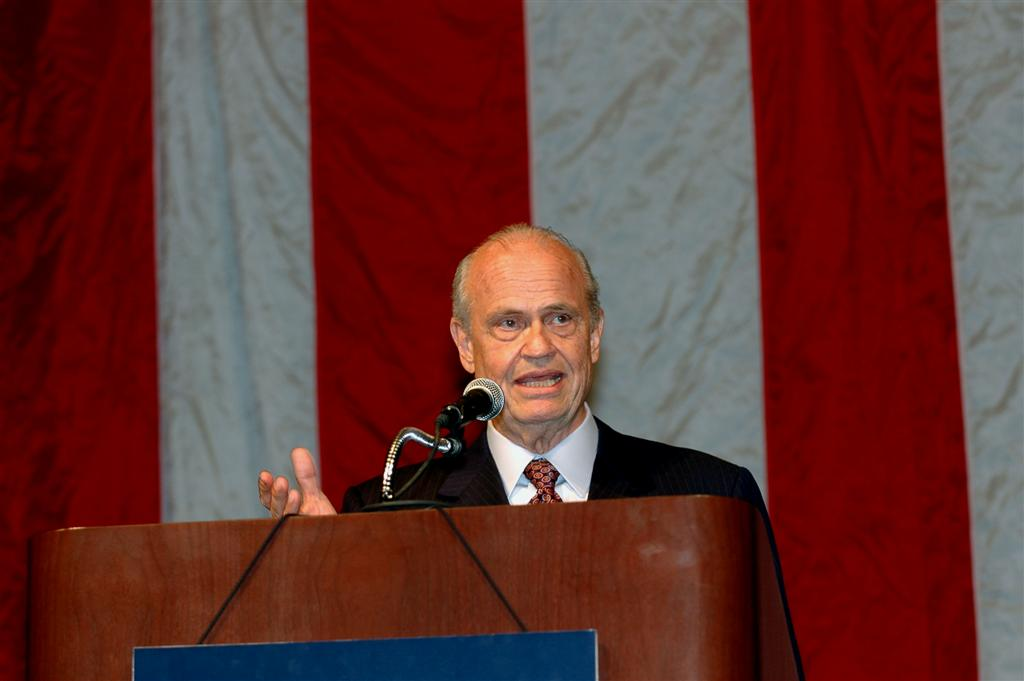
In Indianapolis on August 25, 2007.

On March 11, 2007, Thompson appeared on Fox News Sunday to discuss the possibility of a 2008 candidacy for president. The announcement spurred several grassroots draft movements, including a well-organized draft campaign started by Dean Rice, a former Thompson political aide, in Knoxville, Tennessee. While Thompson had not yet formally announced his intentions, he said he would "leave the door open." He stated that he would not be interested in accepting a hypothetical nomination for vice president, explaining "I don't think I would ever want to do that and be in the second position."

Thompson's March 11 announcement spurred a flurry of conjecture, discussion, and activity on the Internet. A "Draft Fred Thompson" forum site became a particularly popular online forum for supporters. One group of supporters organized under the banner "FredHeadsUSA" with a plan to build a grassroots political movement to expand on Thompson's support on the Internet.

On May 15, Thompson published a video in which he declined to debate Michael Moore about Cuba. The exchange followed Moore's challenge to debate health care policy and Thompson's criticism of Moore's trip to Cuba while filming Sicko.

Thompson formed an exploratory committee on June 1, 2007. Unlike most candidate exploratory groups, his organization operated as a 527 group, beginning operations on June 4. Thompson made his first public appearance after this exploratory committee formed on June 2 at the Virginia Republicans' annual fund-raising gala in Richmond, Virginia. Shortly thereafter, on June 5, 2007, Thompson launched his official website. The same day, there was a Republican presidential candidates' debate with the then-current ten candidates, from New Hampshire, broadcast on CNN. Thompson was mentioned repeatedly as one of the poll front-runners, even though he did not participate.

On June 12, 2007, Thompson appeared on The Tonight Show with Jay Leno. He would not announce his candidacy, but referred to his presidential exploratory committee, which he stated had yielded positive prospects. Leno mentioned that Thompson was second in the polls, and asked him if he would at least state if he would like the job of president. Thompson responded that, while he did not crave the job itself, there were things he would like to do that he could only do by holding that office.

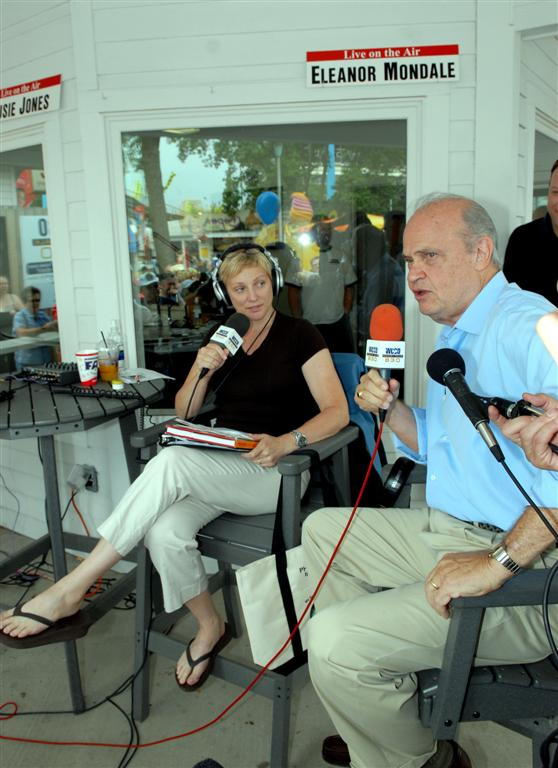
Interviewed by Eleanor Mondale of WCCO radio at the Minnesota State Fair on August 27, 2007.

In early July 2007, Liz Sidoti of the Associated Press wrote: "Thompson's easygoing, no-nonsense style is clearly his strength and undoubtedly has helped him soar in presidential polls." Tucker Eskew, a Republican strategist unaligned in the race, said, "Smooth is good, but sometimes nitty gritty is essential" and "He'll be tested (but) he has a little time." Meanwhile, Thompson received press attention over lobbying work he had done in 1991 and 1992 for a group advocating relaxed regulations on abortion counseling at federally funded clinics. In July 2007, a New York Times article cited Thompson's aides as saying on July 18 that he planned to enter the race just after Labor Day (the first Monday in September), followed by a national announcement tour.

On July 31, 2007, the Thompson committee reported to the IRS that it had raised almost $3.5 million and spent approximately $625,000 in its first month. The committee reported $3,462,355 in contributions and $625,746 in expenditures for June, although the total fell short of an initial $5 million fundraising goal.

Thompson visited Iowa on August 17, 2007, but did not then officially launch his presidential campaign. Thompson was asked by NBC if he was officially in the race for president. Thompson replied with a simple "No." It was also noted that Thompson was already preparing for the Republican debates, so that he would be able to join the other Republican candidates on stage at the events after becoming an announced candidate.

Prior to Thompson's entry into the presidential race on September 5, 2007, the September 10, 2007 issue of Newsweek hit newsstands with a detailed cover story about him. The article examined whether Thompson had the inclination to pursue a lengthy presidential campaign.

=== Official announcement ===
Thompson declared his intent to seek the nomination on September 5, 2007, on The Tonight Show with Jay Leno. He then began a five-day tour of early voting states, including Iowa, New Hampshire and South Carolina. His campaign also released an announcement video online.

=== The campaign begins ===
In late September and early October, Fred Thompson made several blunders, including not being aware of the Supreme Court decision regarding lethal injection, confusing the party in power during the John Roberts nomination, being unaware of the controversy over drilling for oil in the Everglades, and confusing Russia and the Soviet Union. The remarks contributed to coverage questioning his command of issues on the campaign trail.

On September 27, 2007, PBS television hosted a Republican debate in Baltimore, Maryland, at Morgan State University that aired live on PBS and on its website. Thompson, who missed his first debate opportunity since declaring his candidacy, was criticized by event organizers and other GOP candidates for his absence. The debate focused particularly on issues affecting Black Americans, and Giuliani, Romney and McCain were also absent. The October 9, 2007, Republican debate, hosted by CNBC, The Wall Street Journal and the University of Michigan–Dearborn, took place at the Ford Community and Performing Arts Center in Dearborn, Michigan. Thompson participated in the debate, his first since formally joining the race.

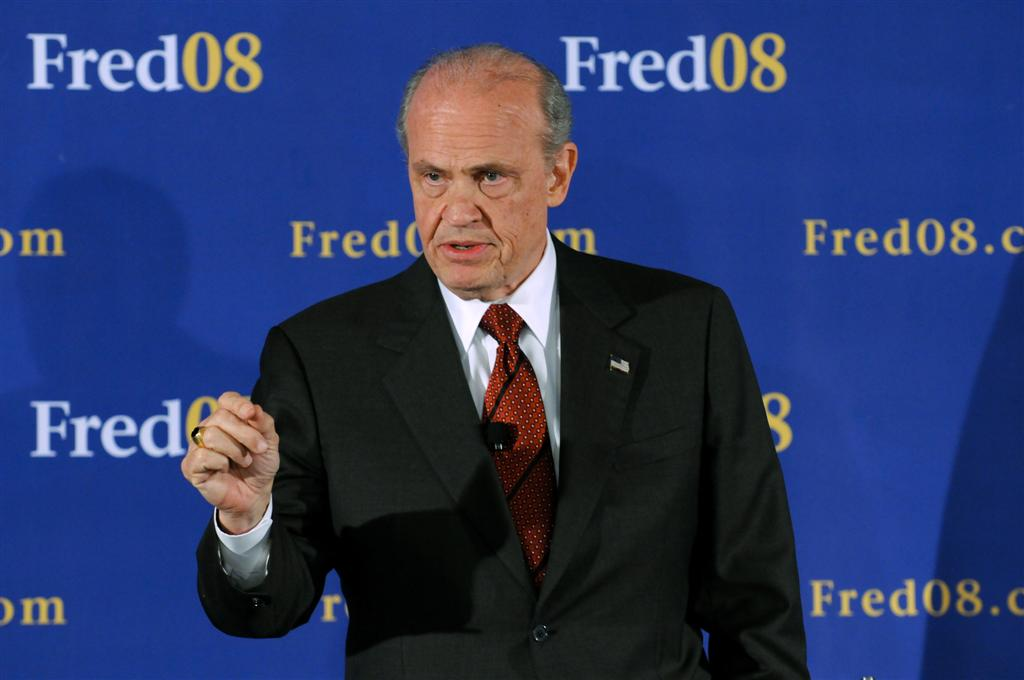
Thompson in Dubuque, Iowa on December 17, 2007.

In early December, Fred Thompson rejected the NIE report stating that Iran had stopped its nuclear weapons program. He later stated that the report should be looked at with skepticism. In a December 5 statement, he questioned the intelligence community's conclusions while also arguing that American policy should remain concerned about Iran.

=== Primaries and caucuses ===
Thompson competed in the Republican primary or caucus in five states. He won 13% of the vote in the Iowa Republican caucuses, trailing Mike Huckabee (34%) and Mitt Romney (25%). John McCain also received 13%, but Thompson received more actual votes. Thompson won three of the 12 delegates selected at the Wyoming Republican County Conventions on January 5, 2008. His Iowa and Wyoming results did not translate into a victory in the subsequent contests.

On January 15, 2008, Thompson placed fifth in the Michigan Republican primary with 4% of the vote, winning no delegates. He received 8% of the vote and two projected delegates in the Nevada caucuses, placing fifth, on January 19, 2008.

On January 19, 2008, Thompson placed third in the South Carolina primary with 16% of the vote, earning no delegates. Thompson was counting on a win in the southern conservative state to save his struggling campaign, and his poor showing was seen as a fatal blow to his candidacy.

=== Withdrawal from race ===
On January 22, 2008, after finishing third in South Carolina – a primary which he had publicly said he needed to win – Thompson announced his withdrawal from the race. In a statement released by his campaign, Thompson said, "Today, I have withdrawn my candidacy for president of the United States. I hope that my country and my party have benefited from our having made this effort." He did not immediately endorse any of the remaining candidates, but in February 2008 endorsed John McCain. The campaign had failed to convert favorable polling from the previous summer into victories in the early nominating contests.

== Campaign staff and policy team ==
Political insiders in Tennessee expected the inner circle of a Thompson campaign to include, in addition to his politically experienced wife, a number of functionaries with whom Thompson had been associated in the past. Thompson's chief fundraiser was Wyatt A. Stewart, a former fundraiser for the National Republican Congressional Committee. Also said to be likely senior advisers were former Republican National Committee chair Ed Gillespie, former vice president of the food and tobacco company Altria Tom Collamore, PR adviser Mark Corallo, former chairman of the Federal Election Commission Michael E. Toner, former Senate aide Tom Daffron, longtime Tennessee politician Tom Ingram, and Congressman Zach Wamp. On July 24, 2007, Thompson announced he was replacing his acting campaign manager, Tom Collamore, with former Michigan senator and Secretary of Energy Spencer Abraham and Florida Republican strategist Randy Enright. Collamore would remain as an adviser, Enright would be political director, and Abraham did not have a title. On August 8, 2007, Bill Lacy was named manager of Thompson's "testing the waters" committee. Lacy had worked in the campaigns of Presidents Reagan and Bush, as well as Senator Bob Dole, and had worked on Thompson's 1994 campaign. Once the candidacy was announced, he continued as campaign manager, while former senator Howard Baker became honorary chairman of the campaign.

== Political positions ==
Thompson described federalism as his "lodestar", providing "a basis for a proper analysis of most issues: 'Is this something government should be doing? If so, at what level of government?'" He presented the division of authority between federal and state governments as a principle underlying his positions on several domestic issues.

Thompson supported free trade and low taxes. He was a self-described authentic conservative since he was part of the Conservative Revolution of the 1990s. He said that Roe v. Wade was a wrong decision that ought to be overturned, and that he was anti-abortion, but he also said that states should decide not to criminalize young women for early-term abortions. Thompson was skeptical that humanity was to blame for global warming. He said citizens were entitled to keep and bear arms if they did not have criminal records. Thompson's support of the McCain–Feingold campaign finance legislation brought criticism from groups such as Gun Owners of America (GOA), who said that the legislation limited their ability to inform the public about the gun rights voting records of incumbent politicians. Thompson said that the limitation on political speech within thirty or sixty days of an election was wrong and should be repealed. Thompson said U.S. borders needed to be secured before considering comprehensive immigration reform. Thompson supported the U.S. invasion of Iraq, but later stated that mistakes had been made since then. He opposed withdrawal from Iraq. He also believed that Iran should be taken seriously. His campaign also proposed reducing federal spending and changing the federal tax system.

== Endorsements ==
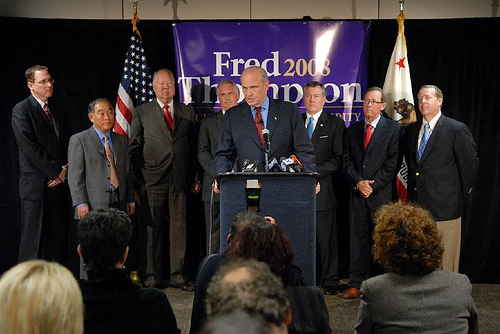
Thompson in Sacramento with endorsing California legislators on November 23, 2007.

On January 11, 2008, Human Events, a conservative weekly magazine, officially endorsed Thompson, writing that he best represented its conservative principles.

On November 13, 2007, the National Right to Life Committee announced its endorsement of Fred Thompson, stating, "Our endorsement is a testament to Senator Thompson's long-standing pro-life record, his commitment to unborn children, and our belief in his ability to win." The endorsement nevertheless prompted disagreement among anti-abortion activists over Thompson's opposition to a federal constitutional amendment banning abortion.

As of September 6, 2007, Thompson had been endorsed by 20 current members of Congress, including both Tennessee senators. Also, on June 12, 2007, former U.S. senator Alfonse D'Amato (New York) endorsed Thompson for president.

Former Senate Majority Leader Howard Baker of Tennessee also expressed his support, saying: "If I had to pick one thing that qualifies him to be president, it's this: he approaches things calmly, deliberately—and he doesn't shoot from the hip." Baker was later named honorary chairman of Thompson's campaign.

Thompson received support from California legislators, seen in this photo from left: Assemblyman Chuck DeVore, Assemblyman Alan Nakanishi, Senator Sam Aanestad, Senator Tom McClintock, Thompson, Assemblyman Martin Garrick, Assemblyman Tom Berryhill, and Senator Dave Cogdill. McClintock was announced as the campaign's California state chairman in October 2007.

List of individuals endorsing Fred Thompson
- U.S. Senator Jim Inhofe (R-OK)
- U.S. Senator Thad Cochran (R-MS)
- U.S. Senator Lamar Alexander (R-TN)
- U.S. Senator Bob Corker (R-TN)
- U.S. Senator Roger Wicker (R-MS) (fourth cousin of Fred Thompson)
- Fmr. U.S. Senator Howard Baker (R-TN)
- Fmr. U.S. Senator Spencer Abraham (R-MI)
- Fmr. U.S. Senator George Allen (R-VA)
- Elizabeth Cheney
- Fmr. Texas Court of Appeals Judge Paul Pressler (R-TX)
- Wyoming State Representative Amy Edmonds (R-WY)
- Former Chair of Wyoming Republican Party Drake Hill (R-WY) (husband of subsequent Wyoming Superintendent of Public Instruction Cindy Hill)
- Missouri Lt. Governor Peter Kinder (R-MO)
- Rep. Gresham Barrett (R-SC)
- Rep. Jeff Miller (R-FL)
- Rep. Donald A. Manzullo (R-IL)
- Rep. Adam Putnam (R-FL)
- Rep. Lee Terry (R-Neb)
- Rep. John Sullivan (R-Okla)
- Rep. Zach Wamp (R-Tenn)
- Rep. Lynn Westmoreland (R-GA)
- Rep. Sue Myrick (R-N.C)
- Rep. Thaddeus McCotter (R-Mich)
- Rep. Marsha Blackburn (R-Tenn)
- Rep. Dan Burton (R-Ind)
- Rep. Steve Buyer (R-Ind)
- Rep. David Davis (R-Tenn)
- Rep. Jimmy Duncan (R-Tenn)
- Rep. Louie Gohmert (R-Texas)
- Rep. Steve King (R-IA)
- Attorney General of Virginia Robert F. McDonnell
- George P. Bush, a member of the Bush family
- Pat Sajak, television personality
- Fmr. U.S. Senator Alfonse D'Amato (R-NY)

== See also ==
- United States Republican presidential candidates, 2008
- Republican Party (United States) presidential primaries, 2008
- Opinion Polling for the Republican Party
