= Dwight L. Bush Sr. =

American businessman

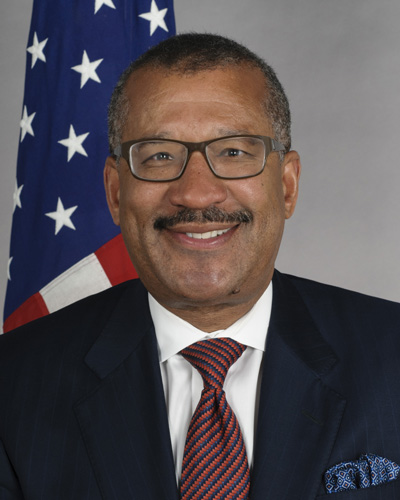

United States Ambassador to Morocco
- In office March 31, 2014 – January 20, 2017
- President: Barack Obama
- Preceded by: Samuel L. Kaplan
- Succeeded by: David T. Fischer

Personal details
- Born: February 4, 1957 (age 69) East St. Louis, Illinois, U.S.
- Party: Democratic
- Spouse: Antoinette Cook Bush
- Children: 2
- Profession: Banking, finance

Dwight Lamar Bush Sr. (born February 4, 1957) is an American businessman who was the United States Ambassador to Morocco from 2014 to 2017.

== Early life and education ==
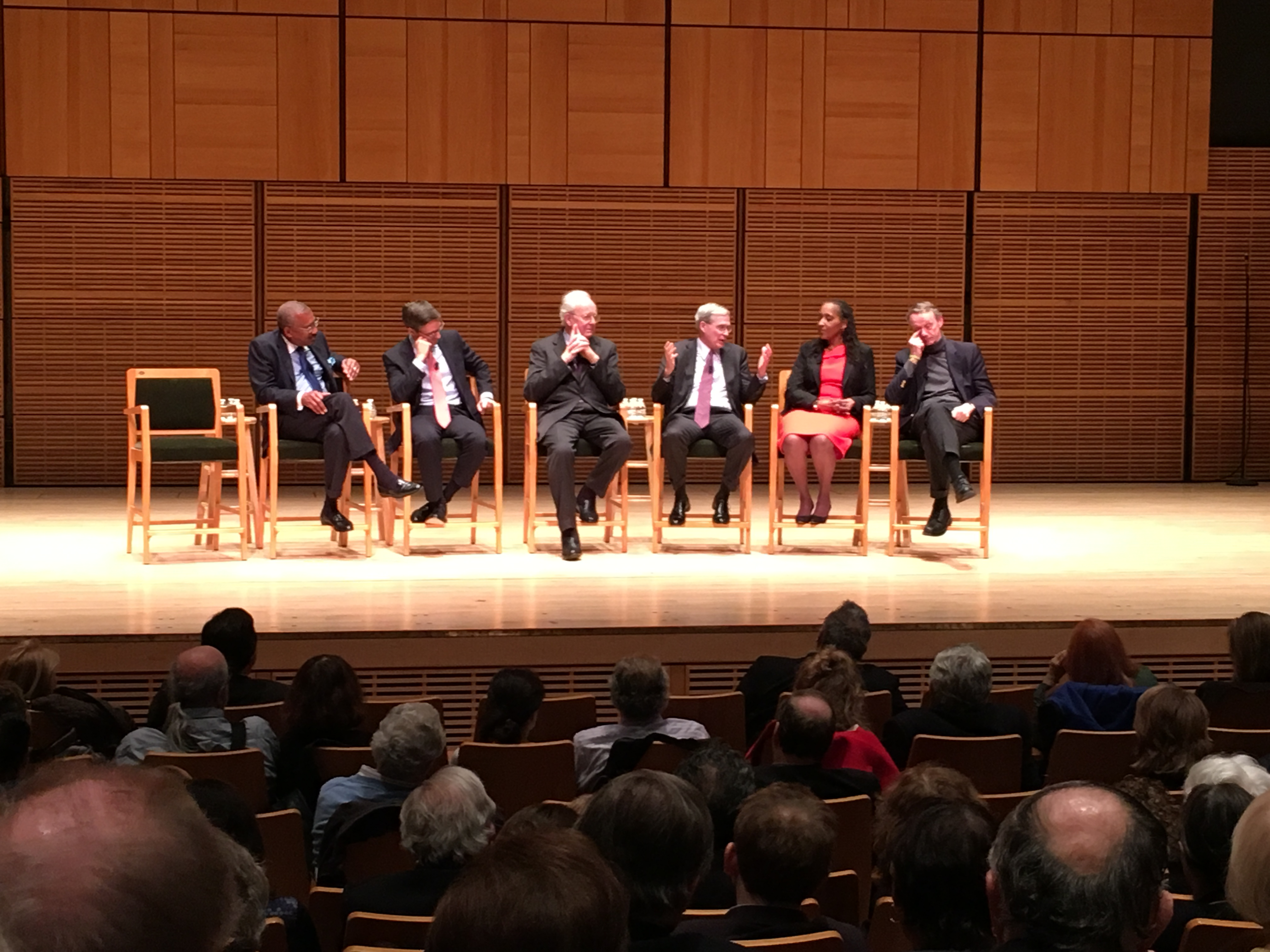
Bush (at left) at a 2016 panel session discussing the influence of Cornell University on American foreign policy

Bush was born in East St. Louis, Illinois. One of five siblings, he has credited his parents for "[making] sure that their children could fully participate in the American Dream."

He attended Cornell University, where he graduated with a bachelor's degree in government in 1979 and was a member of the Quill and Dagger society. He has credited Cornell's noted history professor Walter LaFeber, among others at the university, for sparking his interest in world affairs. He said in 2016, "I show up at Cornell and start to meet scholars. ... If I had not had the Cornell experience, it's highly unlikely I’d be where I am today."

== Business career ==
Upon leaving college, Bush took a position with Chase Manhattan Bank, where he worked for the next fifteen years. There he worked in corporate banking with an emphasis by choice on matters involving international scope; his assignments took him to Latin America, the Middle East, and Asia. He also worked in corporate finance and project finance roles in New York and in Washington, D.C., eventually rising to being managing director in the Project Finance Group.

In 1994, Bush left Chase Manhattan and became vice president of corporate development at Sallie Mae, where he stayed until 1997. Over the next decade he held a variety of positions, including as a principal at Stuart Mill Capital, vice president and chief financial officer at SatoTravel Holdings, and vice chairman at Enhanced Capital Partners. He became the founder of D. L. Bush & Associates, a Washington-based firm that does financial and business consulting. During 2006–2008 he served as president and CEO of Urban Trust Bank, an affiliate of RLJ Companies that intended to become a new model of urban-based community retail banking.

Bush has worked with a number of educational and research institutions, including Cornell University, Xavier University of Louisiana, and the Joint Center for Political and Economic Studies, as well as philanthropic organizations such as the GAVI Alliance and its financing arm The Vaccine Fund.

Bush is married to Antoinette Cook Bush, with whom he has two children. She is a communications law specialist who is executive vice president and global head of government affairs for News Corp. A cousin of Valerie Jarrett, a close aide to President Barack Obama, and a step-daughter of Vernon Jordan, a long-time influential figure, Antoinette Cook Bush has well-developed social and business ties in Washington.

Dwight Bush is himself a longtime member of the Democratic Party and over the years has personally contributed over $130,000 to Democratic politicians and organizations. On a few occasions he has also given money to Republican Party politicians. Bush became a successful bundler for the Barack Obama 2012 presidential re-election campaign. In that effort he raised more than $500,000 for the campaign.

== U.S. Ambassador to Morocco ==
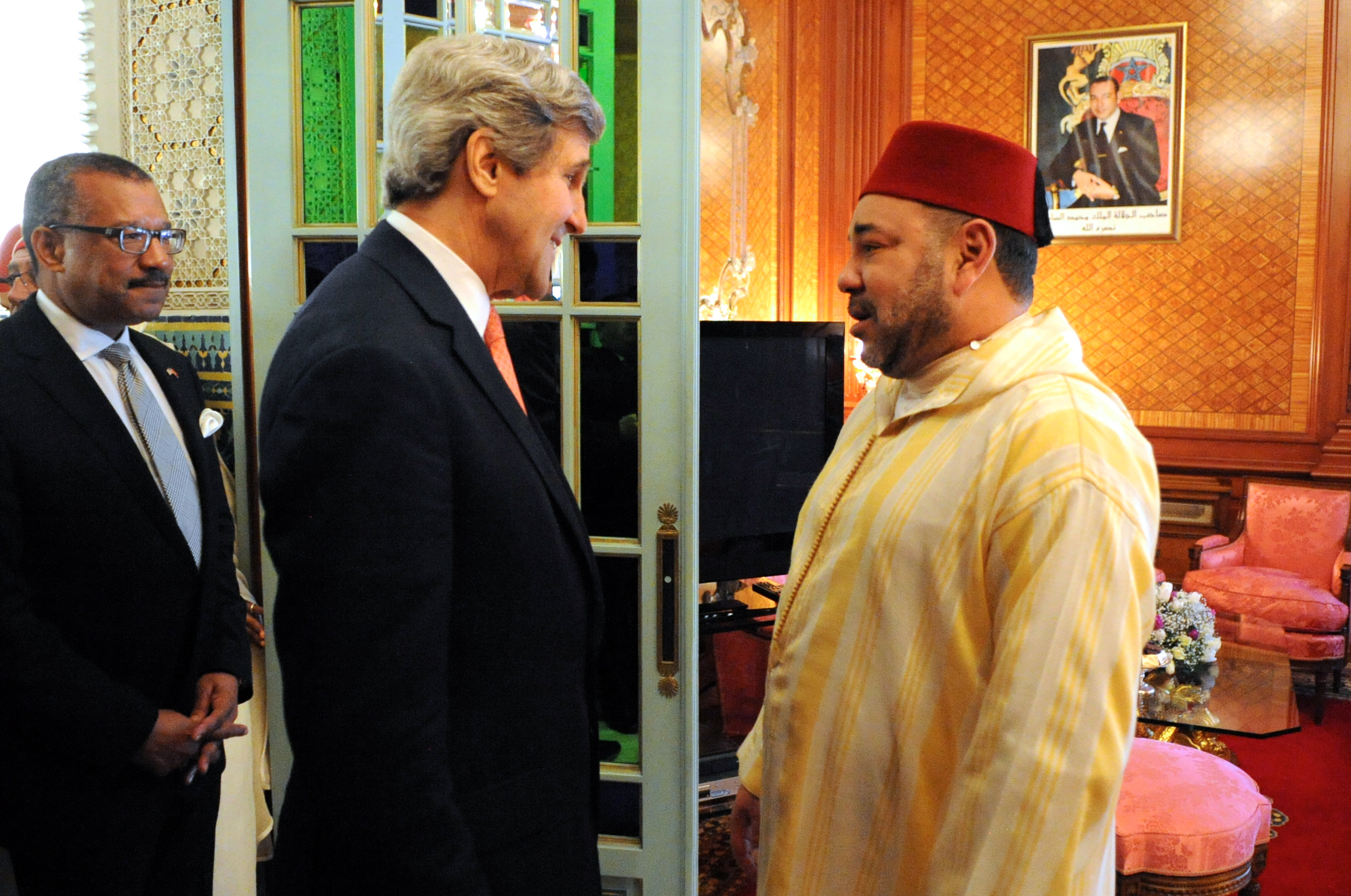
Ambassador Bush with U.S. Secretary of State John Kerry, meeting King Mohammed VI of Morocco in 2014

Bush was nominated for the position of United States Ambassador to Morocco on August 1, 2013, by President Obama, to fill the spot relinquished by the previous ambassador Samuel L. Kaplan. Bush testified regarding his nomination before the United States Senate Committee on Foreign Relations on September 24, 2013. At the time some fifty ambassadorial appointments were being held up for long delays before confirmation, due to frictions between Obama and the Republican-controlled Senate. Finally on March 13, 2014, Bush's appointment was confirmed by voice vote. He assumed the position of ambassador later that month.

In the role, Bush has sought to continue the positive nature that has long characterized Morocco–United States relations. In a January 2016 interview, Bush said he was optimistic about the future of Morocco, because of its open business climate and due to it being a "moderate, progressive Islamic state ... [that] from a political perspective ... has been ahead of many others in the region."

== See also ==
- Ambassadors of the United States

Diplomatic posts
Preceded by Matthew Lussenhop	United States Ambassador to Morocco; 2014–2017	Succeeded by David T. Fischer
