= Henry J. Tasca =

American diplomat

Ambassador Henry J. Tasca
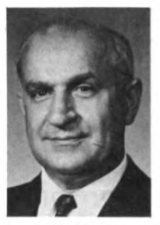

United States Ambassador to Greece
- In office 1969–1974
- President: Richard Nixon
- Preceded by: Phillips Talbot
- Succeeded by: Jack B. Kubisch

United States Ambassador to Morocco
- In office 1965–1969
- President: Lyndon B. Johnson
- Preceded by: John H. Ferguson
- Succeeded by: Stuart W. Rockwell

Personal details
- Born: Henry Joseph Tasca; August 23, 1912 Providence, Rhode Island, U.S.
- Died: August 22, 1979 (aged 66) Lausanne, Switzerland
- Resting place: Arlington National Cemetery
- Education: Temple University (undergraduate); University of Pennsylvania (graduate)

Military service
- Branch/service: United States Navy
- Rank: Lieutenant Commander
- Battles/wars: World War II

Henry Joseph Tasca (August 23, 1912 – August 22, 1979) was an American diplomat during the 1960s and 1970s, as well as an author.

== Early life ==
Tasca was born in Providence, Rhode Island. He would get an undergraduate degree from Temple University and later receive both master's and doctoral degrees from the University of Pennsylvania, although he did spend some time studying at the London School of Economics.

He would also serve as an officer during World War II, achieving the rank of Lieutenant Commander.

== Political career ==
Tasca began his career at the State Department in 1937 as an economic analyst. He went on to serve as the Treasury Department's representative to the U.S. embassy in Rome from 1945 to 1948, and later took on a roll as adviser to Ambassador W. Averell Harriman. He would then be assigned to South Korea in 1953, before ultimately returning to Europe.

Tasca served as the United States Ambassador to Morocco from 1965 to 1969 and to Greece from 1969 to 1974. During his time as ambassador to the Greek junta, he would find difficulty contacting Dimitrios Ioannidis, known then as 'The Invisible Dictator' of the country. At first Tasca was uncertain if the Greek government held true authority, but after meeting Ioannidis, Tasca reported back to the U.S. and shared with the British counterparts that he found the Greek leader hawkish and recommended using access to military aid as a means to manage the state.

Tasca reportedly opposed Henry Kissinger on the issue of overthrowing Makarios III during the 1974 Cypriot coup d'état and suggested that the Sixth Fleet intervene to prevent the subsequent Turkish invasion of Cyprus. He would resign that same year from the State Department while expressing a desire to publish a book naming the agents of the CIA who had urged Ioannidis to overthrow Georgios Papadopoulos.

Tasca's reappointment as ambassador to Greece by Nixon was secured by the March 1973 pledging of hush money for Watergate defendants by Tasca friend Thomas Pappas, an American oil executive. In 1976 Tasca would be called before the House intelligence committee to provide off the record testimony during which he confirmed that the Greek Junta had made campaign contributions to the Nixon-Agnew election fund.

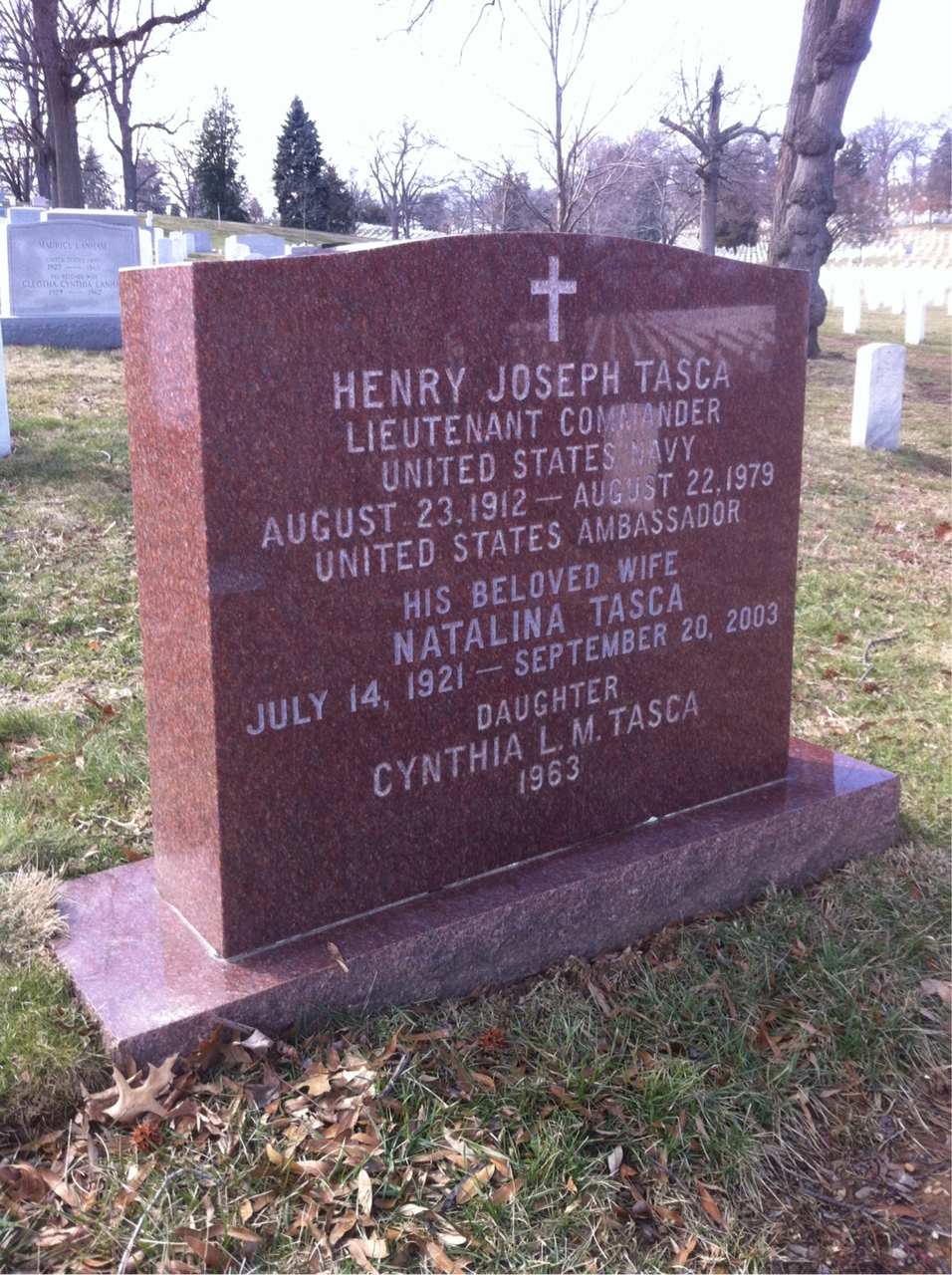
Gravestone of Henry Joseph Tasca, located at Arlington National Cemetery

== Death ==
Tasca died in an automobile accident near Lausanne, Switzerland in August 1979, another vehicle having collided into him at an intersection, while driving with his, then 15-year-old, son John. He was survived by his wife and five children, although one daughter had died before him. Tasca was buried in Arlington National Cemetery.

Eight years following his death, Tasca's son would accuse Kissinger of Tasca's death.

== Publications ==
- The Reciprocal Trade Policy of the United States : A Study in Trade Philosophy (Philadelphia : University of Pennsylvania, 1938)
- World Trading Systems : A Study of American and British Commercial Policies (Paris : League of Nations, 1939)

Diplomatic posts
Preceded by John H. Ferguson	United States Ambassador to Morocco; 1965–1969	Succeeded by Stuart W. Rockwell
Preceded by Phillips Talbot	United States Ambassador to Greece; 1969–1974	Succeeded by Jack B. Kubisch
