= Great America PAC =

American conservative political donor organization

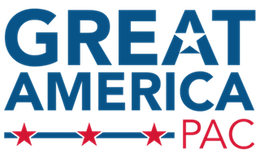
- Founded: June 2016; 9 years ago
- Founder: Eric Beach
- Legal status: Super PAC
- Headquarters: Alexandria, Virginia
- Co-chairs: Eric Beach, Ed Rollins

Great America PAC is a former super PAC (political action committee) that supported Donald Trump in the 2016 presidential election. It was founded in 2016 by Eric Beach, a political strategist and veteran of presidential campaigns. Beach soon brought on Ed Rollins, a long time Republican campaign consultant and strategist who served as the campaign manager for Ronald Reagan's 1984 presidential campaign.

The PAC continued in operation after Trump was elected in 2016. It raised $11.1 million between 2017 and mid-2019, despite being condemned by the Trump 2020 campaign because the PAC has no official connection to the campaign.

== Leadership ==
The group was founded by Bill Dodderidge (founder of The Jewelry Exchange) and Amy Kremer, a former Tea Party activist. Dan Backer, a conservative lawyer, is the treasurer.

The PAC is run by co-chairs Eric L. Beach and Ed Rollins. Former Navy SEAL and Trump supporter Carl Higbie was brought on to serve as the PAC's spokesman he has since been removed from that position. The "hybrid PAC/Super PAC" spent $26.6 million (~$34 million in 2024) during the 2016 election cycle. Its largest contributor in 2016 was Isaac Perlmutter, chairman and former CEO of Marvel Entertainment, who gave $5 million (~$6.39 million in 2024). Houston businessman Robert McNair, owner of the Houston Texans football team, gave the PAC $2 million. Andy Surabian was senior advisor to GAA at year-end 2017.

== Campaign fundraising and spending ==
=== 2016 ===
In June 2016, the PAC released its first ad entitled "Enemies" featuring Higbie. I the ad Higbie says, "The Orlando tragedy is a stark reminder that the enemy and the battlefield is moving here to our shores. Join millions of active duty military members and veterans like me who stand with Donald Trump." Great America PAC spent $700,000 on the ad.

In July 2016, the PAC released its second ad entitled "The Difference" featuring Dorothy Woods, the widow of Tyrone Woods, a former Navy Seal and one of four Americans killed in the 2012 Benghazi attacks. In the ad, Woods says "her husband was a "fierce patriot." Woods goes on to say, "He was killed during the attack in Benghazi while saving American lives under the charge of our State Department," and that "When Hillary Clinton was challenged by Congress on who was to blame for the attack, her response was a disgrace." Great America PAC spent two million dollars to produce the ad.

In July 2016, the PAC released its third ad entitled "Leadership" featuring former New York City Mayor Rudy Giuliani.

=== 2017-2019 ===
The PAC, which says it is Trump's "strongest and most active independent ally," raised $11.1 million from 2017 to mid-2019, and reported spending $4.5 million on ads supporting Trump and his allies since the president's election, according to filings with the Federal Election Commission. But an independent TV-ad tracking firm, Advertising Analytics, said that its data showed only less than $0.4 million spent between January 2017 and December 2019.

== Great America Alliance ==
In December 2016, Great America PAC announced the formation of a new offshoot called the Great America Alliance, which it described as a research and issue advocacy organization whose mission was to support the "Trump Agenda" by advocating "a stronger economy, a more secure nation, and a society with less government intrusion and more freedom for American citizens." The Great America Alliance is co-chaired by Eric L. Beach. Tomi Lahren joined the organization as a senior adviser in May 2017.

In June 2017, during the period when former FBI Director James Comey delivered three hours of sworn testimony before the Senate Intelligence Committee regarding Trump's dismissal of him as FBI director and links between Trump associates and Russian officials, Great America Alliance spent $400,000 (~$501,920 in 2024) on an Internet and television advertising campaign that criticized Comey, calling him "just another DC insider only in it for himself" and saying he "put politics over protecting America" even as "terror attacks were on the rise." In July 2017, Great America Alliance featured Lahren in an ad targeting liberal "snowflakes." The ad described symptoms of "snowflakeism" as "feeling the Bern" or saying "I'm with her."

The Great America Alliance paid $2.7 million to consultants in 2017 and 2018, according to tax forms filed with the IRS, accounting for nearly half the group's total operating expenses. In 2017, almost $1 million (~$1.25 million in 2024) was paid to Frontline Strategies, a public affairs and government relations firm registered in California by Beach, for "management services".

== See also ==
- Democratic Coalition (United States)
- MAGA Inc.
- Save America
