= Stuart W. Rockwell =

American diplomat

Ambassador Stuart W. Rockwell

United States Ambassador to Morocco
- In office March 17, 1970 – October 1, 1973
- President: Richard Nixon
- Preceded by: Henry J. Tasca
- Succeeded by: Robert G. Neumann

Personal details
- Born: Stuart Wesson Rockwell; January 15, 1917 New York City, New York, U.S.
- Died: March 12, 2011 (aged 94) Washington, D.C., U.S.
- Spouse: Rosalind Hollow Morgan

Military service
- Allegiance: United States
- Branch/service: U.S. Army
- Battles/wars: World War II

Stuart Wesson Rockwell (January 15, 1917 – March 12, 2011) was an American diplomat who served as the American Ambassador to Morocco between 1970 and 1974.

== Biography ==
Rockwelll was born in New York City, New York on January 15, 1917. He was the son of Colonel Charles Kellogg Rockwell. Despite being born in New York, he was raised in Paoli, Pennsylvania. He would go on to receive a bachelor's degree in Romance languages from Harvard in 1939. Shortly after, Rockwell achieved the rank of Career Minister in foreign service on August 12, 1939.

During World War II Rockwell joined the U.S. Army, serving in London and France under the Office of Strategic Services.

Rockwell would go on to be stationed in Jerusalem from 1948 until 1950; where, two weeks after the state of Israel declared independence, he was shot at by a sniper.

In June 1956 Rockwell would marry fellow U.S. State Department employee Rosalind Hollow Morgan at St. John's Episcopal Church, Lafayette Square.

Rockwell would quickly find himself working for the Bureau of Near Eastern Affairs. He would take on such roles as the Chairman of the Cyprus Task Force and the Deputy Chief of the Iran Mission.

Rockwell was appointed by President Nixon on March 17, 1970, as Ambassador to Morocco, a position he would hold until October 1, 1973. In 1971 he would be present at the birthday party of King Hassan II at his summer palace during the 1971 Moroccan coup attempt.

Rockwell would ultimately retire in 1979 from government work, at that point serving as the State Department’s Deputy Chief of Protocol.

Rockwell died on March 12, 2011, in Sibley Memorial Hospital from congestive heart failure. His obituary would note, along with the aforementioned, that he was an "avid birdwatcher and skilled fisherman."

== See also ==
- Oral History Interview for Harry S. Truman Library
- Interview undertaken by Rockwell in Library of Congress

Diplomatic posts
Preceded by Henry J. Tasca	United States Ambassador to Morocco; 1970–1973	Succeeded by Robert G. Neumann
