= David T. Fischer =

American businessman and diplomat (born 1946)

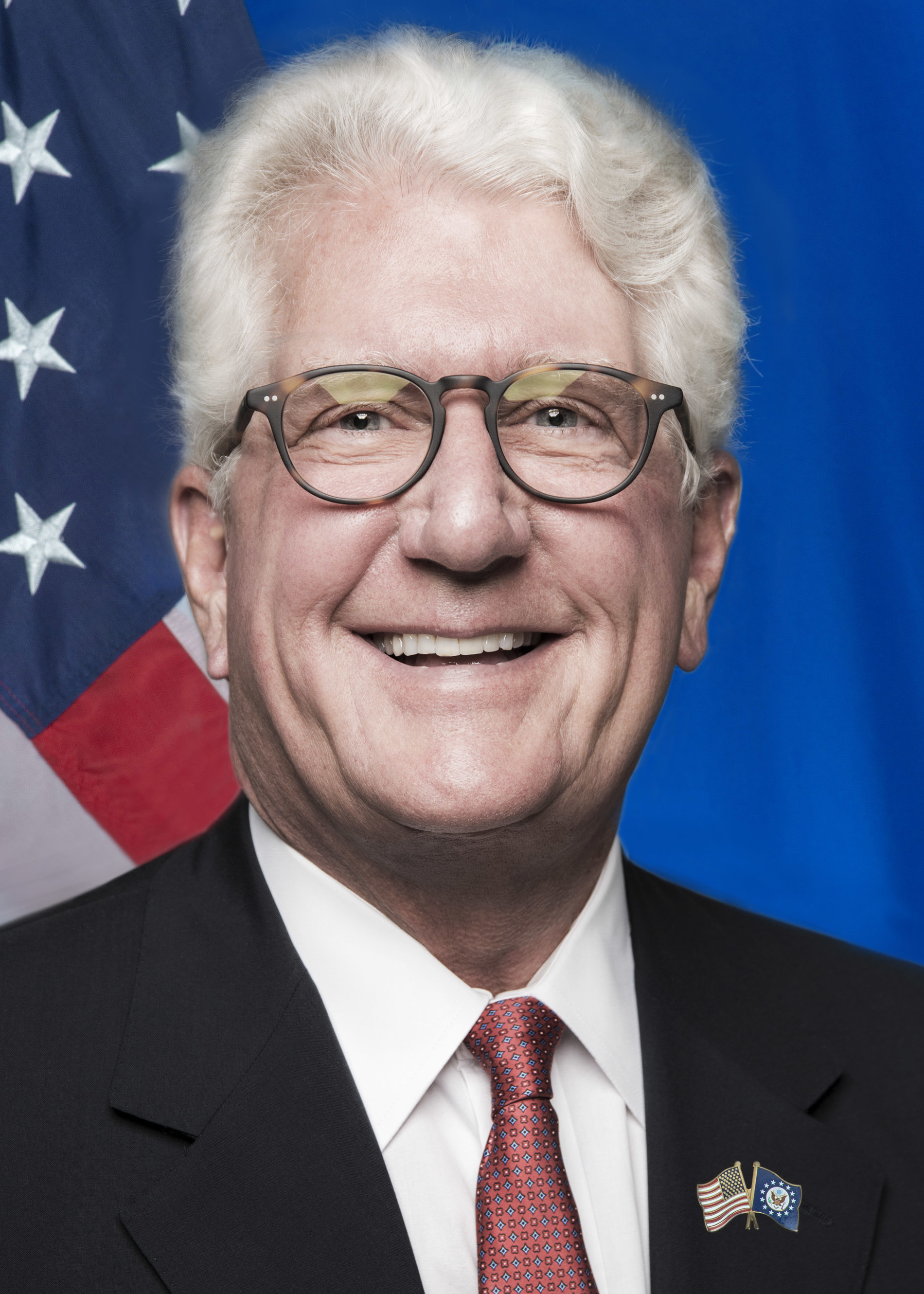
- Official portrait, c. 2020–2021

21st United States Ambassador to Morocco
- In office January 16, 2020 – January 20, 2021
- President: Donald Trump
- Preceded by: Dwight L. Bush Sr.
- Succeeded by: David Greene (acting); Puneet Talwar

Personal details
- Born: 1946 (age 79–80) Detroit, Michigan
- Education: Parsons College
- Occupation: Business Executive

David Thomas Fischer (born 1946) is an American business executive, civic leader, and philanthropist. He was confirmed in 2019 as the United States Ambassador to Morocco and served in this role until 2021.

Fischer was chairman and CEO of The Suburban Collection/Suburban Collection Holdings, a privately held conglomerate consisting of a U.S. dealership group, accessories and parts distribution throughout much of the United States, and logistics and fleet management throughout North America and Canada. In 2017, Suburban Collection division GLS was selected as a General Motors "Supplier of the Year." He has also was chairman emeritus for the North American International Auto Show.

== Early life and career ==
Fischer was born in 1946 in Detroit. His father founded the future Suburban Collection in 1948 as a single Oldsmobile dealership in Birmingham, Michigan. Fischer earned a B.A. from Parsons College, and attended executive education at Harvard Business School. Following his graduation, he became CEO and partner in 1975. Upon purchasing Suburban from his father, Fischer became principal owner in 1978, growing Suburban to the 12th largest privately owned dealership group in the U.S. based on revenue with 32 brands at more than 50 locations throughout Michigan. He stepped down from his role as chairman and CEO of the company when he was confirmed by the Senate as Ambassador to Morocco on December 19, 2019. His son, David Fischer Jr., took over the role. In 2021, Fischer resumed his role as Chairman of Suburban Collection Holdings. The Suburban Collection was acquired by Lithia Motors that year.

Fischer was a member of the Judicial Tenure Commission for the State of Michigan, Emeritus Director of the Detroit Institute of Arts, Chair of the Board of Trustees of Oakland University, on the Board of Trustees of the Community Foundation for Southeast Michigan and on the Board of Trustees for the College for Creative Studies.

== Ambassador to Morocco ==
Fischer was nominated by President Donald Trump in November 2017, and began his confirmation hearing in the Senate Committee on Foreign Relations in August 2018. He was confirmed by the Senate December 19, 2019 and sworn in on January 16, 2020.

Fischer was instrumental in putting forth the Abraham Peace accords and received the National Security Medal from President Donald J. Trump. He was also awarded the Wissam Alaouite of the Order of Commander by His Majesty King Mohammed VI of Morocco.

He left office on January 20, 2021. Fischer is on the advisory board of Abraham Accords Institute for Peace and is a member of the Council of American Ambassadors.

== Personal life ==
Fischer maintains residences in Palm Beach, Florida and Bloomfield Hills, Michigan with his wife, Jennifer. They have three adult sons and ten grandchildren. He was awarded honorary doctorates from Oakland University and the College of Creative Studies. In May 2022, Fischer and his wife, Jennifer received the Ellis Island Medal of Honor from the Ellis Island Honors Society.

Diplomatic posts
Preceded by Dwight L. Bush Sr.	United States Ambassador to Morocco; 2020–2021	Succeeded by David Greene; Chargé d'Affaires
