= Wyatt A. Stewart =

Wyatt A. Stewart, III is Chief Operating Officer of the International Foundation for Electoral Systems and a career political fundraiser. He was the main designer of the fundraising campaigns to restore Ellis Island and the Statue of Liberty, and has done considerable fundraising for the National Republican Congressional Committee.

== Career ==
In 1978, Stewart formed Wyatt Stewart & Associates, a fund raising consulting corporation. For the 2008 primary, Stewart was the fundraiser for Fred Thompson's 2008 primary campaign.
