= Bill Lacy (political operative) =

Former political operative

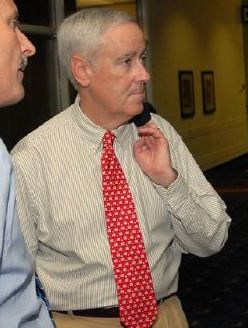

White House Director of Political Affairs
- In office April 5, 1985 – June 17, 1986 Serving with Ed Rollins, Mitch Daniels
- President: Ronald Reagan
- Preceded by: Margaret D. Tutwiler (acting)
- Succeeded by: Haley Barbour

Personal details
- Born: January 1, 1954 (age 71); Detroit, Michigan, U.S.
- Political party: Republican
- Education: Vanderbilt University (BA)

William B. Lacy is a former political operative and business executive who was the director of the Robert J. Dole Institute of Politics, and was the campaign manager for Fred Thompson's 2008 presidential campaign. He was also President Ronald Reagan's Political Director. He resides in Lawrence, Kansas.

== Education ==
Lacy graduated from Vanderbilt University with a bachelor's degree in political science and history.

== Professional career ==
From 1975 to 1982, Lacy served in various positions within the Republican National Committee. In 1982, Lacy left the RNC to become the White House deputy director of political affairs. In 1983, Lacy left the White House to become a senior account executive at Decision Making Information, a polling firm. In 1984, Lacy returned to the Republican National Committee to become the group's political director. From 1985 to 1986, Lacy returned to President Ronald Reagan's administration to serve as White House director of political affairs.

Lacy worked as a strategist for Kansas Senator Bob Dole's 1988 presidential primary campaign, Dole's 1992 senatorial campaign and his 1996 presidential campaign. Lacy also served as a strategist in President George H. W. Bush's 1988 and 1992 presidential campaigns. In 1994, Lacy worked as a strategist on Fred Thompson's senatorial campaign. Following the 1996 presidential election, Lacy left politics and worked for seven years as vice-chairman and CEO of the Sophie Mae Candy Co., a business operated by his family. The company was sold in 2004.

On August 8, 2007, it was announced that Lacy would manage Thompson's 2008 campaign for the presidency. From 2004 until 2021, Lacy served as the director of the Robert J. Dole Institute of Politics, located at the University of Kansas.

Political offices
| Preceded by Margaret D. Tutwiler; Acting | White House Director of Political Affairs; 1985–1986; Served alongside: Ed Rollins, Mitch Daniels (Political and Intergovernmental Affairs) | Succeeded by Haley Barbour |
