= The Democratic Coalition =

American anti-Trump Super PAC

The Democratic Coalition, formerly known as the Democratic Coalition Against Trump, is an American Super PAC founded in 2016 by Nathan Lerner, Scott Dworkin, and Jon Cooper for the purpose of opposing Donald Trump, with a fundraising goal of $20 million by Election Day. It was originally known as the Keep America Great PAC.

The super PAC has garnered attention and notoriety for only spending about 0.3 percent of its budget to support Democratic Party political candidates, while also engaging in "self-dealing".

== Formation ==
The organization was co-founded by Scott Dworkin and Jon Cooper in 2016, along with Nathan Lerner, Chuck Westover, and Jarad Geldner. Dworkin serves as the Coalition's current executive director, as well as host of the Dworkin Report podcast, Series Editor of Meet the Candidates 2020: A voter's guide, and former deputy director for the 2009 Presidential Inaugural Committee and the 2012 Democratic National Convention in Charlotte. Dworkin is the group's current custodian of record. Cooper, the Founding Chairman of the organization is a former Democratic majority leader of the Suffolk County (NY) Legislature and the Long Island campaign chairman for President Barack Obama. Cooper left the Coalition in early 2020 to take a position on the Joe Biden for President campaign.

== Political activism ==
=== FBI complaint against Roger Stone ===
In October 2016, the group filed a complaint with the US Federal Bureau of Investigation against Trump adviser Roger Stone for colluding with Russian interference in the 2016 United States elections. They asked the FBI to look into connections between Stone, the Trump campaign, and the hacking of the Podesta emails. The Coalition said that they "filed their claim electronically to the FBI's general complaints system."

There is no indication that the group's complaint actually played any role in the FBI investigating the matter. Months earlier, Reps. Elijah Cummings (Md.), John Conyers (Mich.), Eliot Engel (N.Y.) and Bennie G. Thompson (D-Miss.), wrote the FBI seeking an investigation of the same matter. Later, it was disclosed that the FBI had already been investigating the matter long before.

=== Boycott Trump app ===
On November 28, 2016, immediately following Trump's election, the group created an app as part of a larger Boycott Trump campaign. It offered a searchable, alphabetical list of companies and businesses with ties to Trump's business empire, offering a brief description for each.

=== Devin Nunes billboard ===
In May 2017, the Democratic Coalition paid for a billboard in Devin Nunes' district, as a direct challenge to GOP members largely avoiding town hall meetings during the height of the investigation into Russian interference in the 2016 United States elections. The billboard read, "Devin Nunes. Hold a town hall. Let's talk about Russia."

=== First Impeachment of Donald Trump ===
In October 2019, the Coalition launched an Impeachment Task Force in direct response to Trump's impeachment defense task force. With a cast of celebrities, the group aimed to amplify breaking news and accounts related to impeachment and counter disinformation using paid advertising. Members included actors Tom Arnold, Ron Perlman and George Takei; and actresses Debra Messing and Alyssa Milano. Other notable task force members were musician Stefan Lessard, authors Grant Stern and Lea Black and former tennis player Martina Navratilova. Dworkin said he was able to recruit many of the celebrities because they were his "personal friends."

=== Marjorie Taylor Greene criticism ===
In February 2021, the Coalition criticized Marjorie Taylor Greene, accusing her of threatening and intimidating another Republican member of Congress who indicated they might vote for impeachment.

=== Remove Abbott campaign ===
On September 23, 2021, the Democratic Coalition launched a campaign called #RemoveAbbott to remove Texas governor Greg Abbott from office. They alleged that Abbott was ignoring scientists and doctors in regards to COVID-19 measures, and that he was signing reckless gun measures that endangered public safety and introducing racist vote suppression bills. The Coalition also cited his Texas Heartbeat Act, which banned abortions after about six-weeks gestation except to save the mother's life.

=== Campaign to pressure Trump to release his taxes ===
In a fundraising appeal, Democratic Coalition touted the group's filing of a Freedom of Information Act (FOIA) request for Trump's correspondence with the Internal Revenue Service (IRS). Mother Jones reported that the action was little more than a "stunt" and a "red herring", because "personal IRS correspondence cannot be released under FOIA."

== Fundraising controversies ==
In 2017 and 2018, following Trump's election to the presidency in the 2016 United States presidential election, the group raised more than $754,000, and spent only 0.3 percent of this amount supporting Democratic Party candidates or targeting Republican Party candidates, a percentage criticized as too low by several Democratic Party activists. Specifically, the Coalition and Dworkin personally had been accused of spending an unusually high percentage of the money on additional advertising to raise even more funds. Mother Jones reported that while virtually no money the PAC has raised going to help elect Democrats, much of the money was funneled to Dworkin's consulting firm Bulldog Finance Group for fundraising consulting and to other individuals associated with the super PAC.

In 2022, John Fetterman's campaign manager for the 2022 United States Senate election in Pennsylvania accused the PAC of deceptively "using John’s name and likeness for their own fundraising", while not actually helping Fetterman's campaign. Fetterman's campaign manager, Brendan McPhillips, said that the PAC should be known as a "scam PAC", explaining: "These people are only pretending that the money they raise goes to John and our campaign. In reality, they are tricking thousands of donors out of hundreds of thousands of dollars." Politico noted that the PAC had a long history of "self dealing."

== See also ==
- Great America PAC
- MAGA Inc.
