= Ed Rollins =

American political consultant

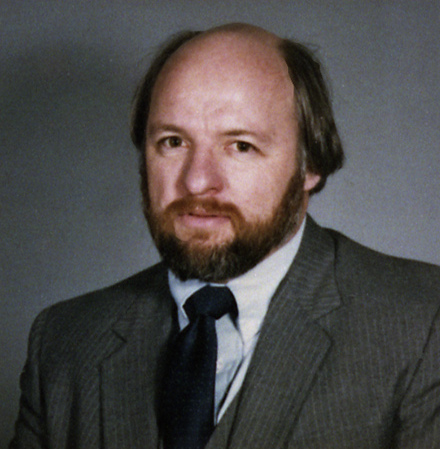
- Rollins in 1983

White House Director of Political and Intergovernmental Affairs
- In office February 5, 1985 – October 1, 1985
- President: Ronald Reagan
- Preceded by: Margaret D. Tutwiler (Political Affairs, acting); Lee Verstandig (Intergovernmental Affairs)
- Succeeded by: Mitch Daniels

White House Director of Political Affairs
- In office January 22, 1982 – October 1983
- President: Ronald Reagan
- Preceded by: Lyn Nofziger
- Succeeded by: Margaret D. Tutwiler (acting)

Personal details
- Born: Edward Rollins; March 19, 1943 (age 83) Boston, Massachusetts, U.S.
- Party: Republican
- Spouse(s): First wife (divorced) Sherrie Sandy (divorced) Shari Scharfer (m. 2003)
- Education: Solano Community College (attended); San Jose State University (attended); California State University, Chico (BA)

Edward Rollins (born March 19, 1943) is an American political consultant and advisor who has worked on several high-profile Republican political campaigns in the United States. In 1983 and 1984, Rollins was national campaign director for the successful Reagan-Bush 1984 campaign.

Rollins previously served as chairman of the pro–Donald Trump Great America PAC. He was Chief Political Strategist at the pro-Ron DeSantis PAC Ready for Ron.

== Early life and education ==
Rollins was born in Boston, Massachusetts, into an Irish Catholic household. At the time, his father was stationed with the U.S. Army in the Aleutian Islands. After the war, his parents returned with him to Vallejo, California, where his father worked as an electrician at the city's Mare Island Navy Yard, primarily building submarines. Rollins grew up in the Federal Terrace housing project, attending St. Vincent Ferrer Grammar and High School. For a year, at age 14, he attended St. Joseph's College, a junior seminary in Mountain View, before returning to Vallejo.

He competed as a boxer from ages 13 to 23, winning several West Coast amateur titles. Rollins recalls his record as 164 victories and just 2 defeats.

Graduating from high school in 1961, he tried to enlist in the Marines, but failed the physical. Shortly thereafter, Rollins spent most of a year in the hospital dealing with his back problems. Once healthy, in 1962, he began undergraduate studies at Vallejo Junior College, eventually earned his associate degree, and transferred to San Jose State University in 1965. Unable to pass the physical exam required for a sports scholarship because of his continuing back problems, after one semester Rollins transferred to California State University, Chico, where he was hired as boxing coach. There he earned his BA in political science with a second major in physical education in 1968.

== Early political career ==
Rollins interned in Sacramento for California's Democratic leader, Assembly Speaker Jesse Unruh, in 1967. Unruh introduced Rollins to Senator Robert F. Kennedy; in early 1968 he worked for Kennedy as a campus coordinator, then later for his primary campaign in Northern California.

After the 1968 election and the GOP gaining a majority in the California Assembly, he was hired by Republican Assemblyman Ray E. Johnson as his chief of staff, despite his prior service under the Democrats. In 1972, Rollins worked for the California campaign to re-elect President Richard Nixon. This gave Rollins his first close contact with Governor Ronald Reagan, who chaired Nixon's California campaign, and Lyn Nofziger, who ran the West Coast Nixon political operation.

Rollins moved to Washington in 1973, to serve as principal assistant to Bob Monagan overseeing congressional relations at the U.S. Department of Transportation. He continued as deputy assistant secretary for congressional affairs through the end of the Ford administration.

From 1977 to 1979, he served as dean of the faculty and deputy superintendent at the National Fire Academy in Washington. During that time, he met and married Kitty Nellor Burnes. In early 1979, Rollins returned to Sacramento with his wife Kitty Nellor and became chief of staff for the Assembly Republican Caucus. During this period, he was offered but ultimately declined the position of chief of staff to former President Nixon.

== Reagan administration, 1981–1983 ==
After the landslide GOP victory in November 1980, Rollins was hired to serve as deputy assistant to the president for political affairs under Nofziger. When Nofziger resigned in November 1981, Rollins was appointed as assistant to the president for political affairs and director of the Office of Political Affairs.

A week before the 1982 election, on October 25, Rollins suffered two strokes, the result of a deteriorating neck artery that had been injured during his final boxing match in 1967. He recovered and returned to his White House job in December 1982, holding the position until resigning in October 1983 to lead Reagan's re-election campaign. In the second term, he rejoined the Reagan Administration for several months in 1985 as Assistant to the President for Political and Governmental Affairs.

== Political campaigns ==
Rollins worked as national campaign director to Ronald Reagan in the 1984 presidential election. Rollins was personally selected for the job by White House Chief of Staff James A. Baker III, who had served as Gerald Ford's manager in 1976. Rollins's deputy and political director was Lee Atwater. The Reagan-Bush ticket ultimately won 49 of the 50 states. After the election, Rollins agreed in January 1985 to return to the White House Office of Political Affairs, under new Chief of Staff Donald Regan. However, Rollins grew disenchanted after Reagan passed him over for the post of Secretary of Labor following the resignation of Raymond Donovan, and with the abrasive chief's staff and style. On October 1, 1985, Rollins joined the Sacramento-based political consulting firm of Russo & Watts.

In the 1988 Republican presidential primaries, Rollins managed the campaign of former New York Congressman Jack Kemp.

In 1989, Rollins headed the National Republican Congressional Committee, the House Republicans' campaign wing. Rollins got into a highly visible feud with President Bush over the 1990 budget deal, in which Bush broke his 1988 campaign promise not to raise taxes. Rollins wrote a memo to GOP candidates, telling them unequivocally, "Do not hesitate to distance yourself from the President." He later wrote, "My job was electing Republicans to the House. George Bush and his tax deal made that impossible. Now my job was to see how many we could save ... Guys who didn't think they had a race were all of a sudden fighting for their lives, including Newt Gingrich."

After resigning from the NRCC, Rollins began working as Washington managing partner for the Sawyer/Miller Group consulting firm.

In June 1992, Rollins agreed to serve as co-manager (with Carter Democrat Hamilton Jordan) of Ross Perot's 1992 presidential campaign. He resigned in July. Later, he suggested that Perot was not emotionally suited to be president. Perot initially ended his campaign the day after Rollins resigned, only to resume his campaign after the Democratic National Convention.

Rollins worked as the campaign manager for Christine Todd Whitman in her 1993 New Jersey gubernatorial race. After organizing a campaign that led to Whitman's come-from-behind victory, Rollins claimed to Time magazine that he secretly paid black ministers and Democratic campaign workers in order to suppress voter turnout. "We went into black churches and we basically said to ministers who had endorsed Florio, 'Do you have a special project?' And they said, 'We've already endorsed Florio.' We said, 'That's fine, don't get up on the Sunday pulpit and preach. We know you've endorsed him, but don't get up there and say it's your moral obligation that you go on Tuesday to vote for Jim Florio.'" After public outcry and calls for an investigation, Rollins partially retracted some of these claims telling People magazine (March 31, 1997, Vol. 47, No. 12) that his comments were "an exaggeration that turned out to be inaccurate."

Rollins managed the campaign of George Nethercutt, who defeated Tom Foley in Washington State's eastern congressional district in November 1994. That year, he was also general consultant to the Michael Huffington campaign for U.S. Senate in California, who lost to late Democrat Dianne Feinstein, and also helped direct the Bruce D. Benson campaign for Governor of Colorado.

In 1998, Rollins consulted on the campaign of Joe Khoury, a Republican candidate in Southern California's Inland Empire. Khoury was running in the Republican primary against incumbent Representative Ken Calvert.

In the 2002 campaign for Governor of California, Rollins consulted for then-Secretary of State Bill Jones, who ran unsuccessfully for the GOP nomination, losing to Bill Simon. Rollins was then hired by Simon for the fall gubernatorial campaign, which lost to incumbent Democrat Gray Davis.

In 2006, Rollins consulted on the campaign of Republican New York State Senate contender K.T. McFarland. He also worked for the campaign of United States Representative Katherine Harris for the U.S. Senate from Florida. According to The Wall Street Journal, the two had a falling-out, with Rollins not attending a staff meeting in Tampa and quitting a few days later after he questioned the viability of her campaign.

Rollins was the national campaign chairman on Mike Huckabee's 2008 presidential campaign. Rollins was later overheard saying that he wanted to "knock out" Mitt Romney's teeth.

Rollins signed on to plan the campaign of Michele Bachmann (R), U.S. representative for Minnesota's 6th district. At the time of his appointment, Bachmann had not yet announced her candidacy but was expected to make her intentions known in June 2011. Rollins "stepped down from running day-to-day operations of the Bachmann campaign" as of September 2011, citing health reasons. Later, it was revealed that he had suffered a stroke.

As of May 2016, Rollins joined the pro–Donald Trump Great America PAC and currently serves as chairman, along with founder Eric Beach and treasurer Dan Backer. As of December 2019, the PAC—which the Trump 2016 campaign properly disavowed, because it is not authorized by that campaign—has paid Rollins at least $330,000. Great America PAC has been one of the largest non-party outside spenders during the 2020 election cycle.

In November 2021, Rollins and entrepreneur Harrison Rogers launched Restore Our Freedom PAC, which plans to spend $10 million in support of Republicans ahead of the 2022 and 2024 elections. The new PAC aims to "undermine the radical Biden agenda and boost pro-liberty Republicans on a national level."

In May 2022, Rollins helped launch Ready for Ron, an organization working to draft and elect Florida Governor Ron DeSantis as president.

== Personal life ==
Rollins has been married three times; his first two marriages ended in divorce. He wed his third wife, Shari Lois Scharfer, a former CBS television executive, in 2003. He has an adopted daughter, Lily, from his second marriage to Sherrie Rollins Westin. Rollins lives in New York, where he has served as political commentator for CNN and (currently) Fox News and Fox Business, appearing frequently on Lou Dobbs Tonight.

== Books ==
- Bare Knuckles and Back Rooms: My Life in American Politics, co-authored by Tom DeFrank (N.Y.: Broadway Books, 1996)

Political offices
Preceded by Lyn Nofziger	White House Director of Political Affairs; 1982–1983	Succeeded by Margaret D. Tutwiler; Acting as White House Director of Political Affairs
Preceded by Margaret D. Tutwiler; Acting as White House Director of Political Affairs	White House Director of Political and Intergovernmental Affairs; 1985; Served alongside: Bill Lacy (Political Affairs); Lee Verstandig, Mitch Daniels (Intergovernmental Affairs)	Succeeded by Mitch Daniels
Preceded by Lee Verstandig as White House Director of Intergovernmental Affairs	White House Director of Political and Intergovernmental Affairs; 1985; Served alongside: Bill Lacy (Political Affairs); Lee Verstandig, Mitch Daniels (Intergovernmental Affairs)	Succeeded by Mitch Daniels
