= Edward M. Gabriel =

American diplomat (born 1950)

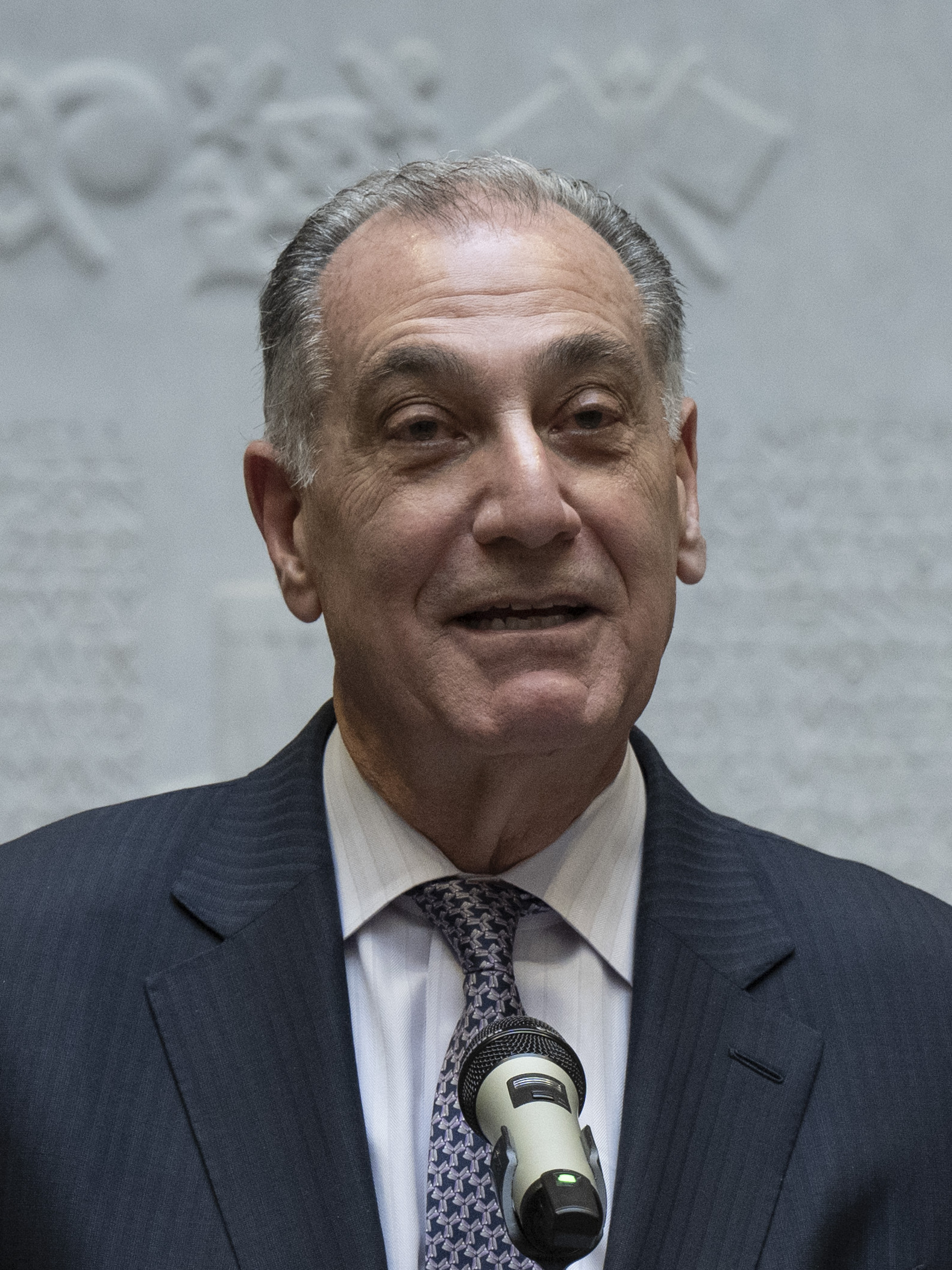

United States Ambassador to Morocco
- In office 1997 – March 2001
- President: William Clinton
- Preceded by: Marc Charles Ginsberg
- Succeeded by: Margaret D. Tutwiler

Personal details
- Born: March 1, 1950 (age 76) Olean, New York, United States

Edward M. Gabriel (born March 1, 1950) is an American diplomat who served as the United States Ambassador to Morocco from 1997 to 2001. He is the currently a member of the board of directors for the United States Institute of Peace.

== Early life and education ==
Gabriel grew up in Olean, New York. Gabriel earned a B.S. in business from Gannon University and an Honorary Doctorate of Laws from Gannon University in 1972.

== Career ==
Gabriel is president and CEO of The Gabriel Company, LLC, as well as the president and CEO of the American Task Force on Lebanon. He also served as CEO of the Madison Public Affairs Group. Gabriel previously held roles in areas like the United States Department of Energy, Council of Energy Resource Tribes, and Keystone Policy Center's Energy Project.

He serves on the boards of the American Schools of Tangier and Marrakech, the Keystone Policy Center, AMIDEAST, and Lebanese American University.

=== Ambassador to Morocco ===
Gabriel was sworn in as the 16 US ambassador to Morocco in November 1997 and arrived there in January 1998. He served until March 2001.

=== USIP ===
On December 15, 2021, President Joe Biden nominated Gabriel to be a member of the board of directors of the United States Institute of Peace. He was confirmed to a four-year term by the U.S. Senate via voice vote on August 4, 2022.

== Awards and recognitions ==
Gabriel has won many awards, including the Ellis Island Medal of Honor and ACCESS Arab American of the Year. He has also won Lebanon's National Order of the Cedar and Morocco's Order of the Ouissam Alaouite.

== Personal life ==
Gabriel and his wife, Kathleen Linehan, live in Washington, D.C. and the Eastern Shore of Maryland.

Diplomatic posts
Preceded by Gary S. Usrey	United States Ambassador to Morocco; 1998–2001	Succeeded by Margaret D. Tutwiler
