= Samuel L. Kaplan =

American lawyer

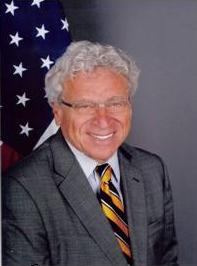

United States Ambassador to Morocco
- In office September 18, 2009 – April 30, 2013
- President: Barack Obama
- Preceded by: Thomas T. Riley
- Succeeded by: Dwight L. Bush Sr.

Personal details
- Born: Samuel Louis Kaplan; 1936 (age 89–90)
- Spouse: Sylvia Chessen
- Profession: Lawyer

Samuel Louis Kaplan (born 1936) is an American diplomat who served as United States Ambassador to Morocco. He was appointed ambassador in 2009 by President Barack Obama, replacing the previous ambassador Thomas T. Riley. He is one of only a few American Jews to represent the United States in a Muslim nation.

Before entering the diplomatic service, Kaplan was a well-known business and community leader in Minneapolis, where he headed a law firm that he founded in 1978. He attended the University of Minnesota where he earned both an undergraduate and a Juris Doctor degree, graduating magna cum laude, and where he served as President of the Minnesota Law Review.

== Career ==
After law school graduation, Kaplan was an assistant professor of law and a guest speaker in law classes. Later, he founded the law firm of Kaplan, Strangis and Kaplan, P.A, in 1978.

Diplomatic posts
Preceded by Thomas Riley	United States Ambassador to Morocco; 2009–2013	Succeeded by Matthew Lussenhop
