= R. Clarke Cooper =

American diplomat

R. Clarke Cooper CStJ FRSA
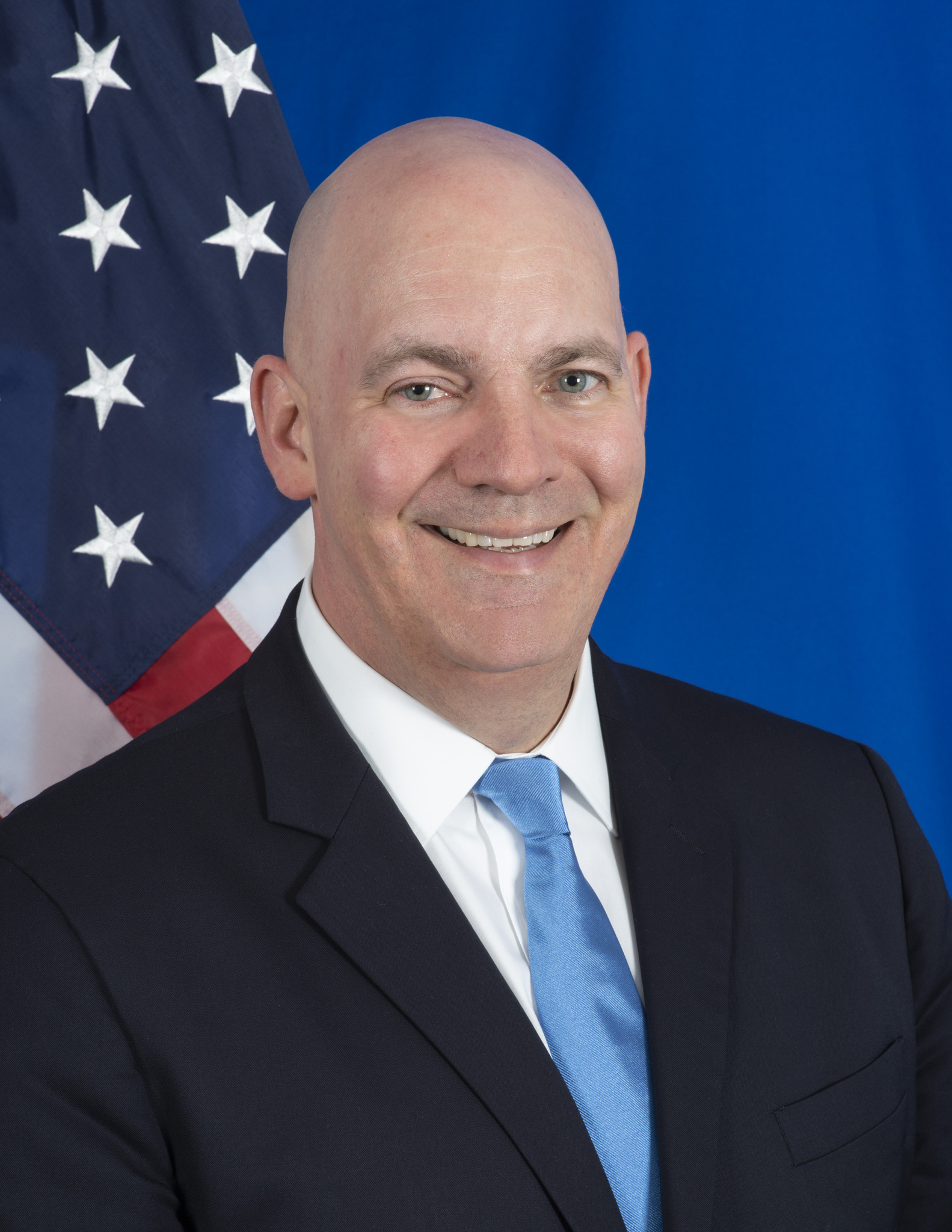

19th Assistant Secretary of State for Political-Military Affairs
- In office May 1, 2019 – January 20, 2021
- President: Donald Trump
- Secretary: Mike Pompeo
- Preceded by: Puneet Talwar
- Succeeded by: Jessica Lewis

Personal details
- Party: Republican
- Spouse: Michael J. Marin
- Education: Florida State University (BS); University of Oxford (MBA)

Military service
- Allegiance: United States
- Branch/service: United States Army
- Unit: Joint Special Operations Command

The Hon. René Clarke Cooper is an American diplomat and combat veteran who served as the 19th Assistant Secretary of State for Political-Military Affairs from 2019 to 2021. Cooper is currently a consultant and Distinguished Fellow with the Atlantic Council focusing on defense trade as well as the Middle East and Africa. He is also a Fellow of the Royal Society of Arts.

== Early life and career ==
Cooper was born in New Mexico when his late father was assigned to the White Sands Missile Range. He was raised in North Florida where he attained the rank of Eagle Scout and served as student body president of Leon High School in Tallahassee, Florida.

After graduating from university, Cooper joined the Washington, D.C. legislative staff of Florida Republican Congresswoman Ileana Ros-Lehtinen. He then worked with her husband, former U.S. Attorney Dexter Lehtinen, as an agent for the Miccosukee Tribe. During these years, Cooper become involved in Republican Party politics and campaigns including serving as a national committeeman for the Young Republicans.

Cooper served as a field coordinator for former Florida Governor Jeb Bush's successful 1998 gubernatorial campaign against Buddy MacKay, and was appointed deputy director of the State of Florida's Washington Office. There he advanced state interests before the United States Congress and federal agencies. Cooper served on the state's negotiating team for the Comprehensive Everglades Restoration Plan (CERP) alongside Governor Bush, Secretary of Environmental Protection David Struhs, and Everglades Czar, J. Allison DeFoor.

== Education ==
He earned a bachelor's degree in history from Florida State University. There, he was senior class president, president of the Pi Kappa Phi fraternity, and rowed for the university men's team.

Cooper earned a master of business administration from the University of Oxford. A member of St Hugh’s College, Oxford, Cooper served as college chapel warden and rowed for the St. Hugh’s men’s team. He also was elected to Apollo University Lodge, and became a life member of The Oxford Union Society.

== Military service ==
While serving Governor Bush, Cooper was recruited into the U.S. Army Reserve. Cooper accepted an officer commission in August 2001 at Fort Meade, Maryland. He graduated from the U.S. Army Airborne School at Fort Benning, Georgia and the Intelligence School at Fort Huachuca, Arizona. In 2004 he deployed to Iraq on active duty with Combined Joint Task Force-7 and later Multi-National Force Iraq (MNF-I). In Iraq, Cooper served as Aide-de-Camp to the late Major General Charles H. Davidson IV. While Aide to Davidson, Cooper was known for actively advocating for the protection of archeological sites and artifacts, particularly the ancient city of Babylon.

In 2013, Cooper returned to active military service with Special Operations Command Africa. While serving in East Africa in 2015 as the Senior Intelligence Analyst for Combined Joint Task Force- Horn of Africa (CJTF-HOA), Cooper was recruited for service in Joint Special Operations Command (JSOC). Cooper returned to the United States, and joined JSOC in 2016. It was during a 2018 JSOC rotation in the Middle East when Cooper was formally nominated for senior diplomatic appointment.

== George W. Bush administration ==
In 2001, Cooper joined the ranks of Bush appointees as an assistant director of the National Park Service, where he advocated for greater access to public lands and was part of Interior Secretary Gale Norton's efforts to challenge Clinton administration executive orders restricting use and access of public lands. During the first term of the Bush administration, Cooper was soon called to active military duty by the United States Department of Defense.

During the second term, Cooper served at several diplomatic postings including the United States Embassy in Baghdad, where as an advisor to Ambassador Zalmay Khalilzad, he often travelled with members of Congress in the Middle East region. His final Department of State posting was at the United States Mission to the United Nations where he served as Counselor for United Nations Management & Reform and as an Alternate Representative to the United Nations Security Council. At the UN, Cooper worked with like-minded member states on UNSC mandate review, advocated for accountability of UN peacekeepers, and pressed for performance measures for UN peacekeeping operations.

== Donald J. Trump administration ==
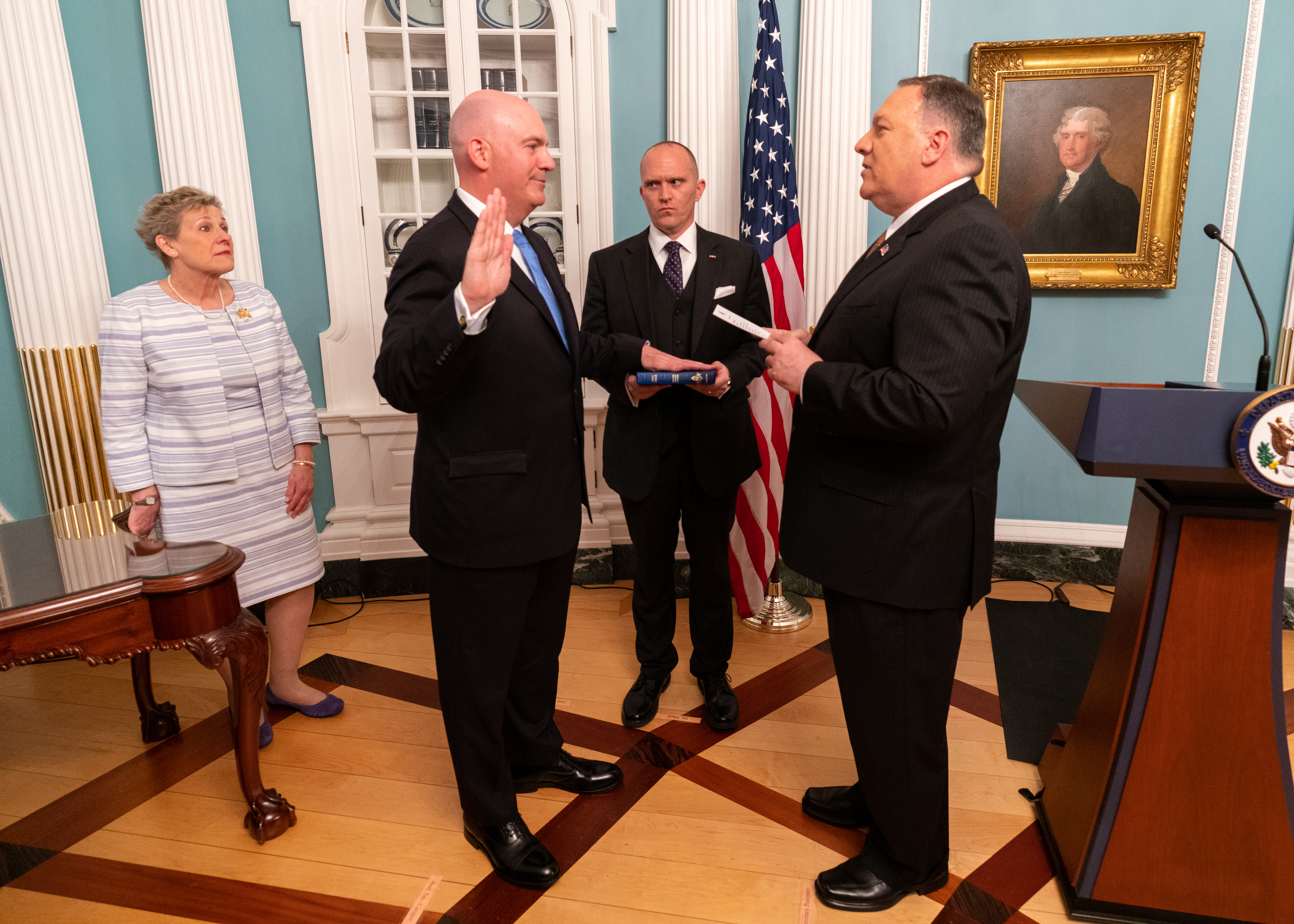
Cooper is ceremonially sworn in by U.S. Secretary of State Michael R. Pompeo as Assistant Secretary for Political-Military Affairs at the U.S. Department of State in Washington D.C., in 2019.

In 2018, President Trump nominated Cooper to be the Assistant Secretary of State for Political-Military Affairs. Upon his return to service at the United States Department of State, Cooper candidly addressed great power competition and was an advocate in promoting America as the global "partner of choice" and as the "preferred partner" for security cooperation and defense trade. During his tenure, he implemented reforms to streamline arms export licensing and improve government support to American defense industry.

At Cooper's 2019 ceremonial swearing-in on the 230th anniversary celebration of the founding of the State Department, Secretary of State Mike Pompeo noted, “...with his two decades of experience in both military and diplomatic roles, I'm confident that Clarke is the right person for the job.”

Among enabling bilateral security partnerships, and advocacy for burden sharing to counter shared threats, Cooper was also known for his longtime advocacy of performance measures across UN peacekeeping missions, women in active peacekeeping roles, and accountability measures for troop and police contributing countries.

In 2021, Cooper and several colleagues were awarded the Superior Honor Award for the Political-Military Bureau's interagency coordination and implementation of the security cooperation elements of the Abraham Accords in support of the United Arab Emirates, the Kingdom of Bahrain, and the Kingdom of Morocco normalizing relations with the State of Israel.

== Other notable civic work ==
In 2010, Cooper was elected executive director of the Log Cabin Republicans. At the time, former Governor Jeb Bush noted, "During my administration, Clarke was part of an excellent team that built improved relations with the federal government that benefited the citizens of Florida. He proved himself to be hardworking and results driven and a genuine public servant."

Cooper advocated the need for open military service before the Congress securing Republican votes to repeal Don’t ask, don’t tell (DADT) while concurrently leveraging the U.S. Supreme Court case of Log Cabin Republicans v. United States. In 2011, some social conservatives took issue when Cooper was invited to join the Republican National Committee's finance committee.

From March 2012 through December 2012, Cooper was a guest op-ed columnist for The Washington Times, writing a column called "Politics and Pride," focusing on political issues from a conservative LGBT perspective.

In 2013, Cooper was the featured conservative in Timothy Greenfield-Sanders' HBO Documentary "The Out List," and was among notable Republicans who were signatory to an amicus curiae brief submitted to the United States Supreme Court in support of same-sex marriage during the Hollingsworth v. Perry case.

== Awards and decorations ==
Military

- Defense Meritorious Service Medal, Meritorious Service Medal, Joint Service Commendation Medal with Three Oak Leaf Clusters, Army Reserve Component Achievement Medal with Three Oak Leaf Clusters, National Defense Medal, Iraq Campaign Medal with Two Stars, Global War On Terrorism Expeditionary Medal with Two Stars, Global War On Terrorism Medal, Armed Forces Reserve Mobilization Medal with Hour Glass and M Device, Combat Action Badge, Parachutist Badge

Civilian

- Commander of the Venerable Order of St. John (CStJ), HM King Charles III, 2026; Superior Honor Award, U.S. Department of State; Officer of the Venerable Order of St. John (OStJ), HM Queen Elizabeth II, 2018; Eagle Scout, Boy Scouts of America

== Personal life ==
Cooper belongs to Christ Church Millwood, an Episcopal church in Clarke County, Virginia. During his time in Iraq, Cooper was known to work with The Reverend Canon Andrew White, the Vicar of St. George's Parish in Baghdad and the Archbishop of Canterbury's Representative in Iraq. During his childhood, Cooper's mother was active in the charismatic renewal movement within the Episcopal Church.

A multi-generational Freemason, Cooper was made a Master Mason at Federal Lodge No 1, Free and Accepted Masons. He subsequently attained the 32nd degree of the Scottish Rite. Whilst at Oxford, Cooper was elected to membership at Apollo University Lodge No 357.

Cooper is married to Michael J. Marin, a fellow Army combat veteran.
