= Puneet Talwar =

American diplomat (born 1965)

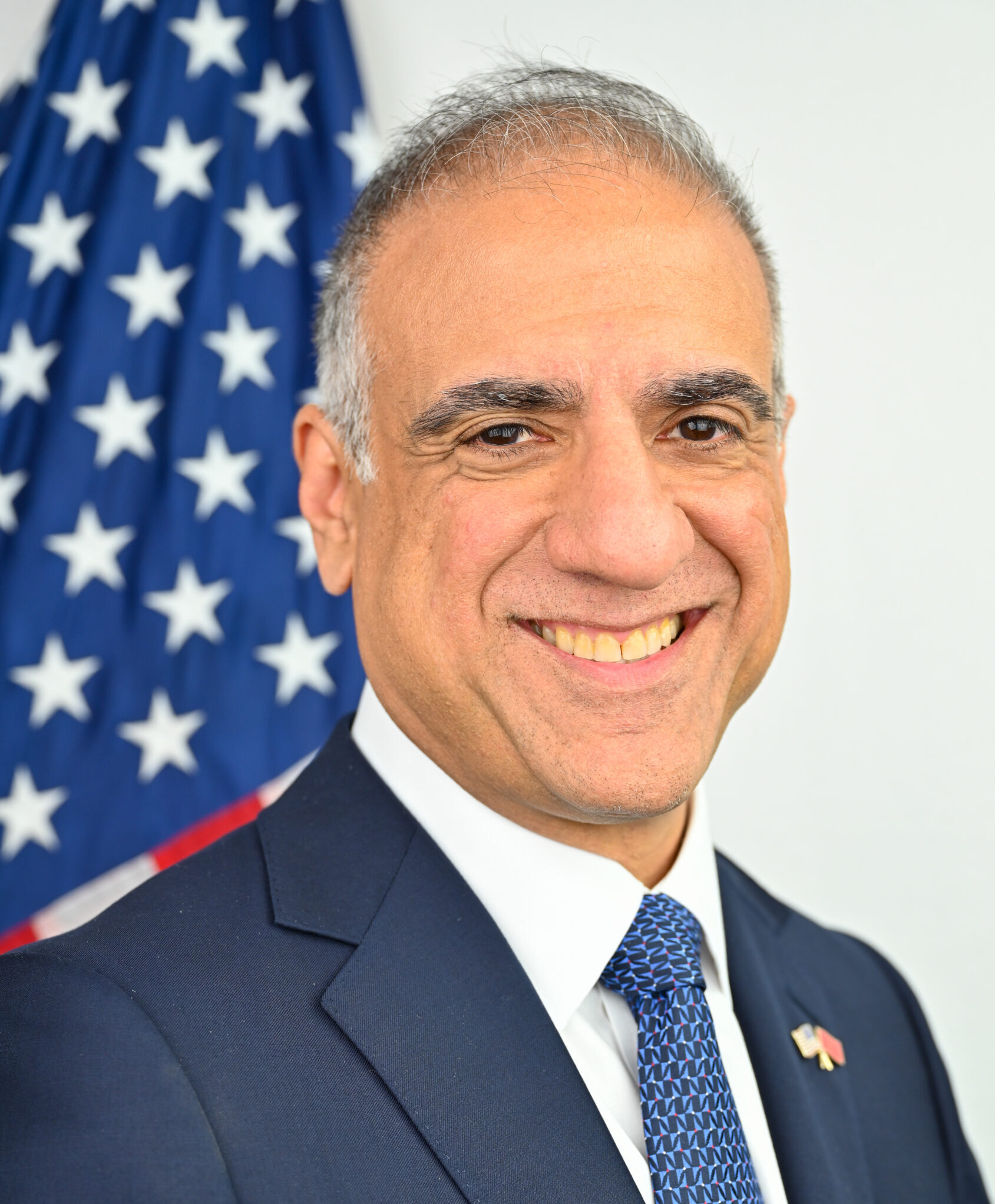

22nd United States Ambassador to Morocco
- In office November 21, 2022 – January 20, 2025
- President: Joe Biden
- Preceded by: David T. Fischer
- Succeeded by: Duke Buchan

18th Assistant Secretary of State for Political-Military Affairs
- In office April 9, 2014 – November 2015
- President: Barack Obama
- Preceded by: Andrew J. Shapiro
- Succeeded by: R. Clarke Cooper

Personal details
- Born: 1965 (age 60–61) Washington D.C., U.S.
- Education: Cornell University (BS); Columbia University (MIA)

Puneet Talwar (born 1965 in Washington D.C.) is an American diplomat who served as the United States Ambassador to Morocco from November 2022 to 2025. He previously served as the Assistant Secretary of State for Political-Military Affairs from 2014 to November 2015. Talwar served as a top Middle East advisor to Barack Obama and played a central role in the backchannel diplomacy that produced the Iran nuclear deal. Prior to working in the White House, he was a top advisor to then-Senator Joe Biden on the Senate Foreign Relations Committee for twelve years.

== Education ==
Talwar earned a Bachelor of Science degree from Cornell University and a Master of International Affairs from Columbia University.

== Career ==
From 1995 to 1999 and again from 2001 to 2008, Talwar served as the Chief Middle East, North Africa, and South Asia Advisor to Joe Biden on the United States Senate Committee on Foreign Relations. Talwar then worked on the Policy Planning Staff of the United States Department of State from 1999 to 2001. Talwar was a foreign policy advisor for the United States House of Representatives, and served as Special Assistant to the President and Senior Director for Iraq, Iran, and the Gulf States on the National Security Council from 2009 to 2014. In 2012, Foreign Policy Magazine named Talwar as one of the 50 most powerful Democrats in foreign policy.

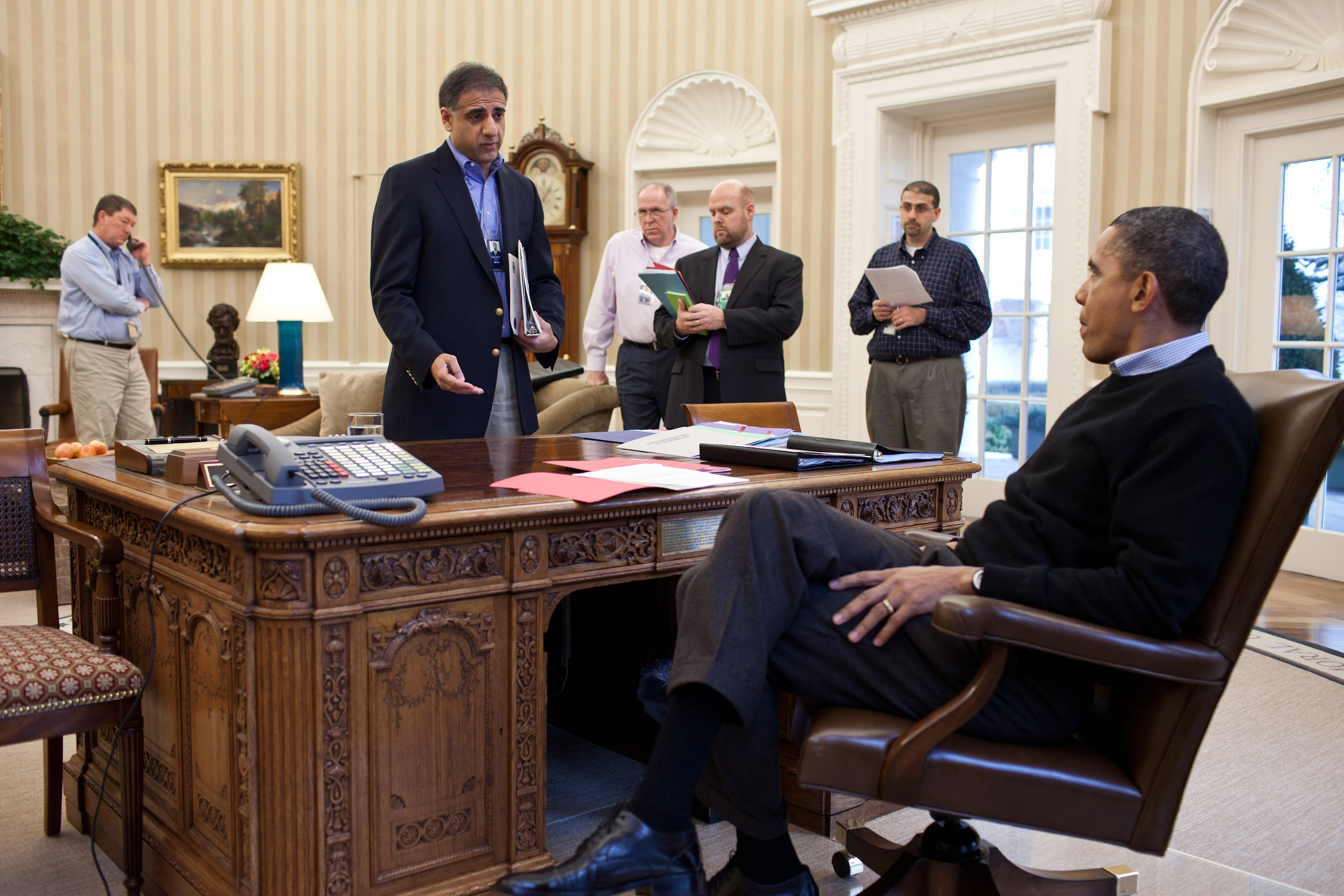
Talwar briefs President Barack Obama, 2011

In 2014, Talwar was nominated by Barack Obama to serve as Assistant Secretary of State for Political-Military Affairs. He left office in 2015 and was eventually replaced by R. Clarke Cooper in 2019.

Since leaving government service, Talwar has served as chairman and President of Crest International, a US-based private investment company. He is also a senior advisor at WestExec Advisors, a strategic advisory firm founded by former Obama administration officials Michèle Flournoy and Tony Blinken.

In November 2020, Talwar was named a volunteer member of the Joe Biden presidential transition Agency Review Team to support transition efforts related to the United States Department of State.

=== Ambassador to Morocco ===
On March 18, 2022, President Joe Biden nominated Talwar as the United States Ambassador to Morocco. Hearings on his nomination were held before the Senate Foreign Relations Committee on July 27, 2022. The committee favorably reported the nomination on August 3, 2022. He was confirmed by the entire Senate via voice vote on September 8, 2022.
