= Unity Systems =

- Company type: Private
- Industry: Home automation
- Founded: 1983
- Headquarters: Redwood City, California, United States

Unity Systems was a home automation company that was based in Redwood City, California, United States, founded in 1983. In 1985, Unity Systems released the Unity Home Manager which was one of the earliest home automation systems as well as one of the most successful systems. It featured a green monochrome touchscreen display with options such as temperature settings, floor plans, lighting control, the sprinkler system, HVAC control, security and general maintenance settings. The Unity Home Manager was sold by a dealer network which consisted of small, and dedicated companies, with around 90 dealers across the United States at a point in time. Unity systems closed in 1999.

== See also ==
- Home automation for the elderly and disabled
- Internet of Things
- List of home automation software and hardware
- List of home automation topics
- List of network buses
- Smart device
- Web of Things
