= Michael Ussery =

American diplomat

Michael Ussery (born 1951) was the American Ambassador to Morocco from 1989 to 1992. He was a non-career appointee.

Since leaving Morocco, Ussery is Chairman of Mongolia Holdings, Vice Chairman of Kima Communications and its subsidiary, Coast to Coast Communications, is on the Board of Directors of Safi Apparel, a U.S. Military contractor in Afghanistan. Since 2009, he has been Chairman of the Advisory Board of the CalErin Group,

Ussery was born and raised in Columbia, South Carolina. He graduated from Newberry College.
