= Riddleberger =

Riddleberger is a surname. Notable people with the surname include:

- Denny Riddleberger (born 1945), American Major League Baseball pitcher
- Harrison H. Riddleberger (1844–1890), American lawyer, newspaper editor and politician
- James Williams Riddleberger (1904–1982), American diplomat and career foreign service officer
