= Voodoos and Obeahs =

1932 book by Joseph J. Williams

Voodoos and Obeahs: Phases of West India Witchcraft
- Title page for Voodoos and Obeahs: Phases of West India Witchcraft (1932)
- Author: Joseph J. Williams
- Language: English
- Genre: Non-fiction
- Publisher: Dial Press Inc
- Publication date: December 1932
- Publication place: United States
- Followed by: Psychic Phenomena of Jamaica

Voodoos and Obeahs: Phases of West India Witchcraft is a 1932 book by Joseph J. Williams, published by Lincoln MacVeagh and S. J. Dial Press. Williams later wrote a companion book, Psychic Phenomena of Jamaica.

Voodoos and Obeahs examines the history of voodoo and obeah in the Caribbean, specifically Jamaica and Haiti, traces them back to their roots in Africa and discusses the influence imperialism, slavery and racism had on their development.
