= Wallace Murray =

Wallace Murray may refer to:

- Wal Murray (1931–2004), Australian politician
- Wallace Murray (diplomat) (1887–1965), American diplomat
