= Howland H. Sargeant =

American politician (1911-1984)

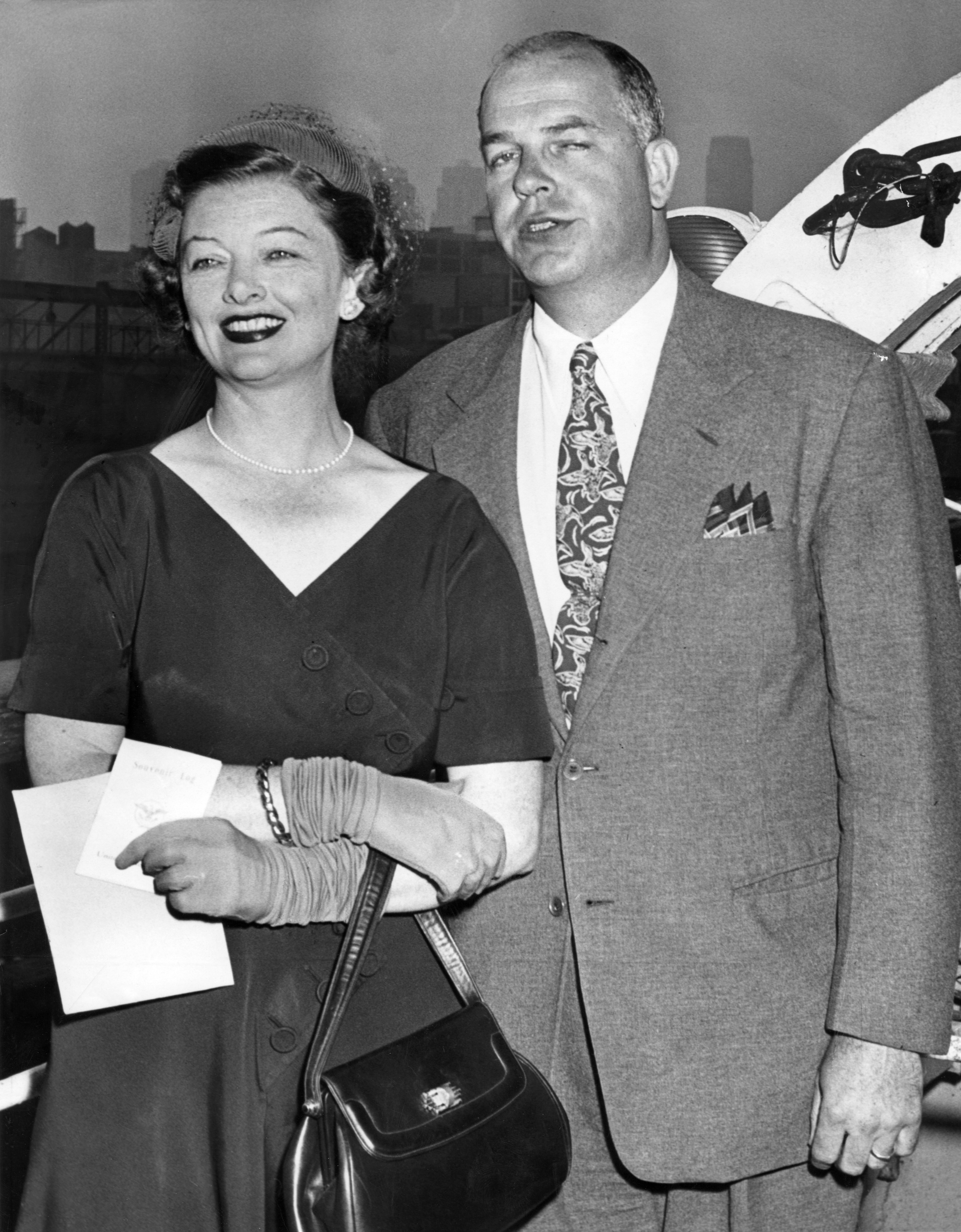
- Sargeant and his wife Myrna Loy in 1951

5th Assistant Secretary of State for Public Affairs
- In office February 21, 1952 – January 29, 1953
- Nominated by: Harry Truman
- Preceded by: Edward W. Barrett
- Succeeded by: Carl McCardle

Personal details
- Born: Howland Hill Sargeant; July 13, 1911 New Bedford, Massachusetts, U.S.
- Died: February 29, 1984 (aged 72) New York City, U.S.
- Resting place: Rural Cemetery; New Bedford, Massachusetts
- Spouse: Myrna Loy (m. 1951; div. 1960)

Howland Hill Sargeant (July 13, 1911 – February 29, 1984) was United States Assistant Secretary of State for Public Affairs from 1952–53, and the president of Radio Liberty from 1954 to 1975.

== Biography ==
Born in 1911 in New Bedford, Massachusetts, Howland H. Sargeant was educated at Dartmouth College, graduating in 1932. He played for the Dartmouth Big Green baseball team. In 1932, he was a Rhodes scholar.

Sargeant later joined the United States Department of State. In 1947, he became Deputy Assistant Secretary of State for Public Affairs. In this capacity, Sargeant was a member of the United States delegation to UNESCO and in 1950 was Vice-President of the UNESCO General Conference that met in Florence.

During his time as Deputy Assistant Secretary of State for Public Affairs, Sargeant met actress Myrna Loy, who was a member of the U.S. delegation to UNESCO. Sargeant married Loy on June 2, 1951, becoming Loy's fourth husband. This marriage would end in a divorce on May 31, 1960, and the couple did not have any children.

In 1952, President of the United States Harry Truman nominated Sargeant to be Assistant Secretary of State for Public Affairs and Sargeant subsequently held this office from February 21, 1952, until January 29, 1953.

The American Committee for the Liberation of the Peoples of Russia founded Radio Liberty in 1954, and Sargeant became Radio Liberty's first president. He held this position until 1975. Radio Liberty merged with Radio Free Europe in 1976.

Sargeant died on February 29, 1984, of an apparent heart attack.

Government offices
Preceded by Edward W. Barrett	Assistant Secretary of State for Public Affairs; February 21, 1952 – January 29, 1953	Succeeded by Carl McCardle
