= John Cooper Wiley =

American diplomat (1893-1967)

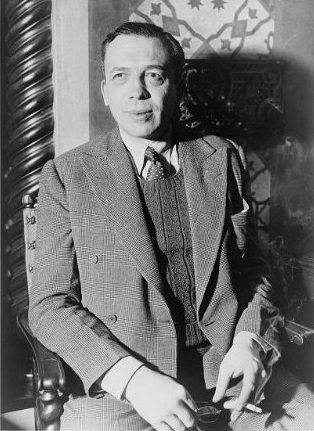
- John Cooper Wiley in 1936

United States Ambassador to Latvia
- In office July 18, 1938 – June 17, 1940
- President: Franklin D. Roosevelt
- Preceded by: Frederick A. Sterling
- Succeeded by: Earl L. Packer as Chargé d'Affaires ad interim

United States Ambassador to Colombia
- In office December 16, 1944 – May 3, 1947
- President: Franklin D. Roosevelt; Harry Truman
- Preceded by: Arthur Bliss Lane
- Succeeded by: Willard L. Beaulac

United States Ambassador to Portugal
- In office April 10, 1947 – March 15, 1948
- President: Harry Truman
- Preceded by: Herman B. Baruch
- Succeeded by: Lincoln MacVeagh

United States Ambassador to Iran
- In office 1948–1950
- President: Harry Truman
- Preceded by: George V. Allen
- Succeeded by: Henry F. Grady

United States Ambassador to Panama
- In office July 25, 1951 – November 27, 1953
- President: Harry Truman; Dwight Eisenhower
- Preceded by: Monnett Bain Davis
- Succeeded by: Selden Chapin

Personal details
- Born: September 26, 1893 Bordeaux, France
- Died: February 3, 1967 (aged 73) Washington, D.C., U.S.
- Resting place: Crown Hill Cemetery and Arboretum, Section 29, Lot 6
- Spouse: Irena Monique Baruch
- Profession: Diplomat

John Cooper Wiley (September 26, 1893 – February 3, 1967) was a United States Foreign Service officer and ambassador.

== Career ==
Wiley was born in Bordeaux, France, while his father served there as U.S. Consul. He was educated by tutors and studied at Union College, Columbia Law School, and Georgetown University Law Center. While at Union College, he joined the Theta chapter of the Psi Upsilon fraternity.

He entered the United States Foreign Service in 1915 and served in several positions in Europe and South America. Wiley was a Counselor of Embassy in Moscow in 1934. From 1935 to 1937, he served as the Consul General at Antwerp. In 1938, he was the Chargé d'Affaires ad interim in Austria, the Envoy Extraordinary, and the Minister Plenipotentiary to Latvia and Estonia (the last ambassador before the Soviet occupation in 1940). After World War II, Wiley headed the negotiations with the Soviet Union to liquidate lend-lease accounts that allowed the US to provide arms for the Allied Powers. He went on to receive appointments as Ambassador Extraordinary and Plenipotentiary to Colombia, Portugal, Iran, and Panama. While he was the ambassador to Portugal, Wiley negotiated the acquisition of US naval and air stations in the Azores.

== Retirement ==
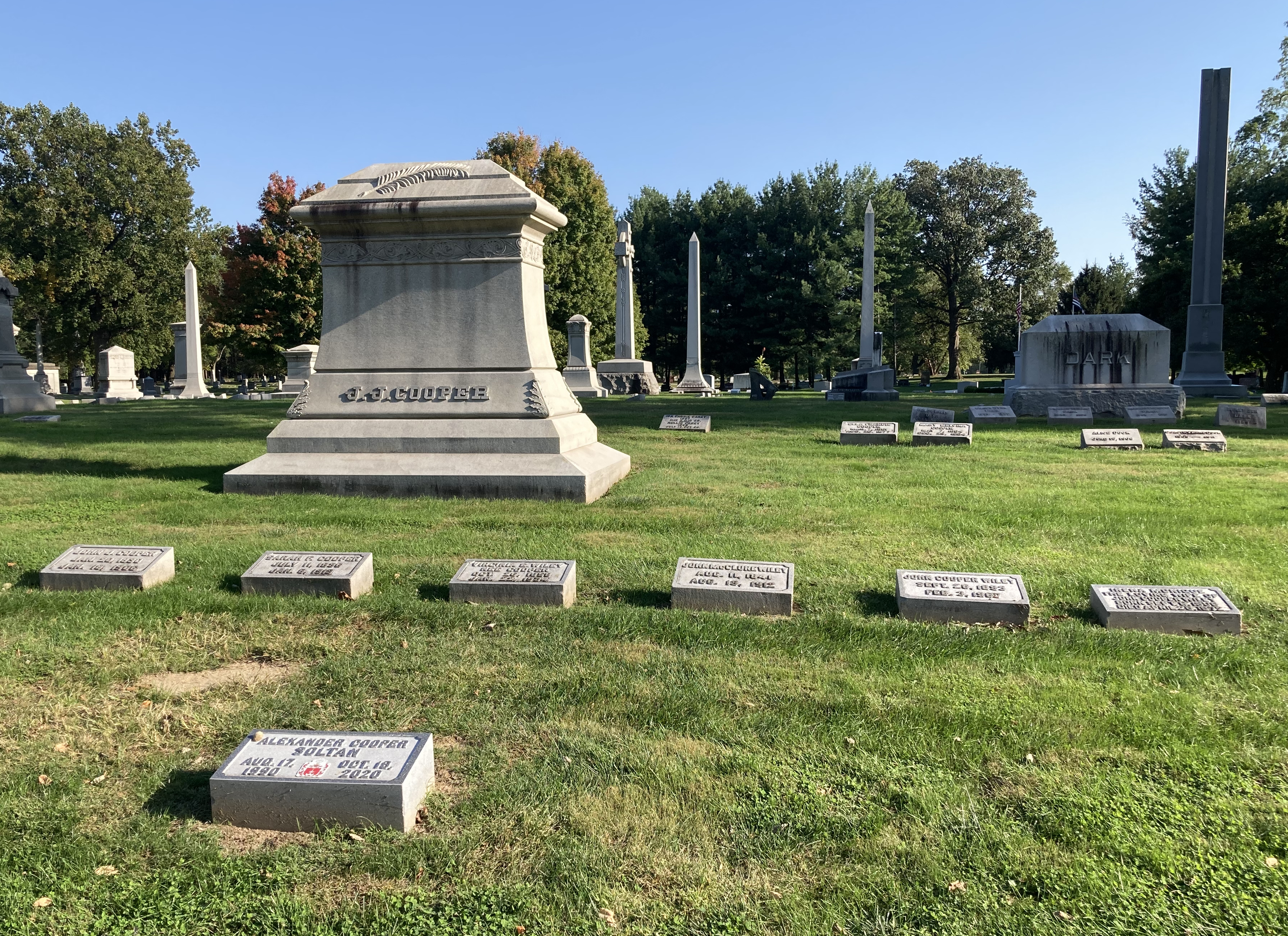
Wiley's grave (second from right) at Crown Hill Cemetery

He retired in 1953 and resided in the Georgetown area of Washington, D.C. He died in Washington on February 3, 1967. He was buried at Crown Hill Cemetery in Indianapolis.

== Family ==
He was the son of Congressman John M. Wiley and the grandson of John J. Cooper, who served as Indiana State Treasurer. John Cooper Wiley was married to Irena Monique Baruch (1906-1972), a well-known sculptor and portrait painter.

== Footnotes ==
Diplomatic posts
Preceded by Frederick A. Sterling	United States Ambassador to Latvia; 1938–1940	Succeeded by Earl L. Packer
Preceded by Frederick A. Sterling	United States Ambassador to Estonia; 1938–1940	Succeeded by Earl L. Packer
Preceded by Arthur Bliss Lane	United States Ambassador to Colombia; 1944–1947	Succeeded by Willard L. Beaulac
Preceded by Herman B. Baruch	United States Ambassador to Portugal; 1947–1948	Succeeded by Lincoln MacVeagh
Preceded by George V. Allen	United States Ambassador to Iran; 1948-1950	Succeeded by Henry F. Grady
Preceded by Monnett Bain Davis	United States Ambassador to Panama; 1951–1953	Succeeded by Selden Chapin
