= Richard Cunningham Patterson Jr. =

American diplomat

Richard Cunningham Patterson Jr. (1886–1966) was an American government official and diplomat. Patterson was born in Omaha, Nebraska, the son of Richard Cunningham Patterson, an attorney, and Martha Belle Neiswanger. After working as a laborer in the gold mines of South Dakota and a year at the University of Nebraska, he received an engineer of mines degree at Columbia University’s School of Mines in 1912.

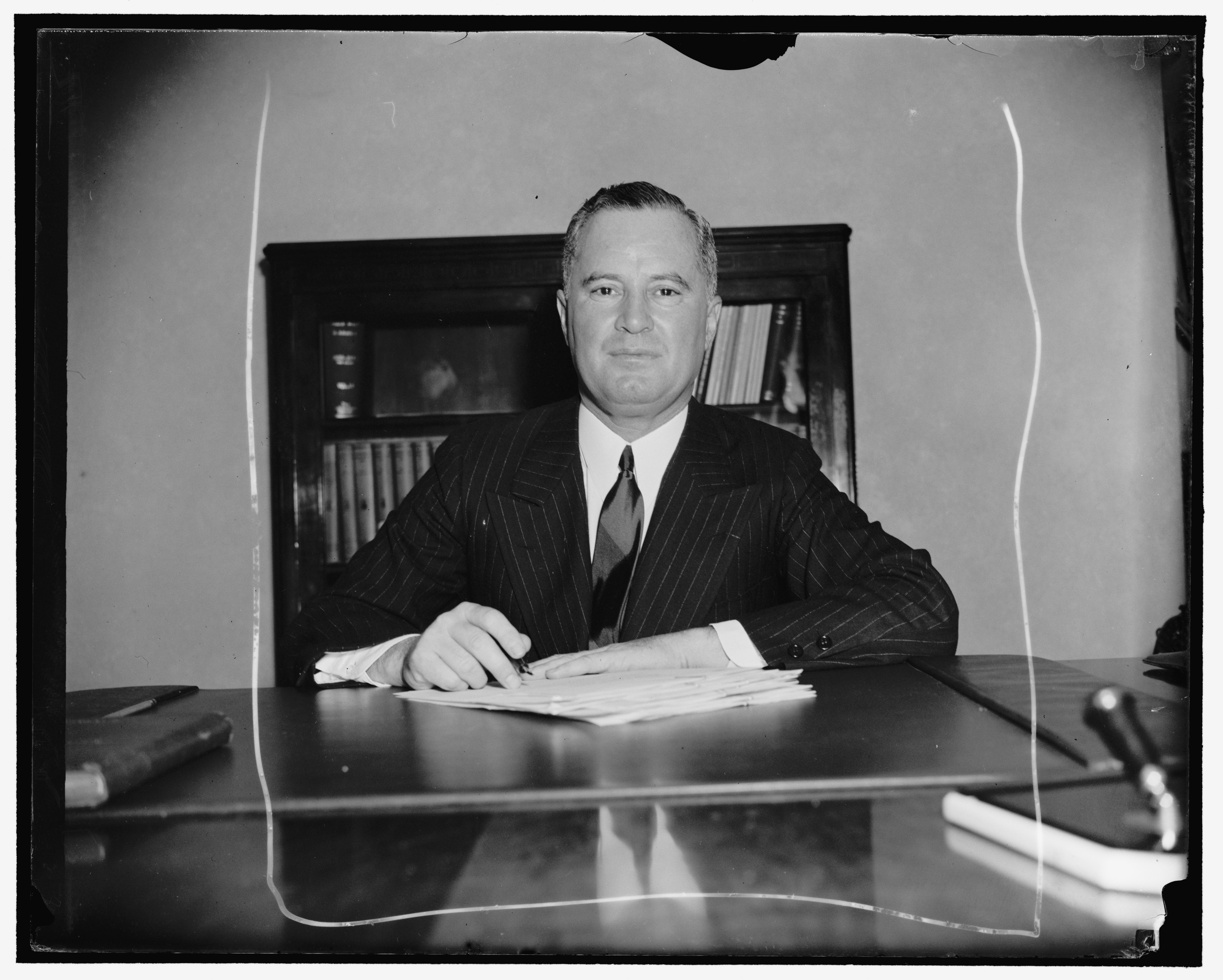
Assistant Commerce Secretary Patterson, May 1938.

Patterson was the U.S. ambassador to Yugoslavia (1944–1946), Guatemala (1948–1951), and U.S. Minister to Switzerland (1951–53). While ambassador to Guatemala, he popularized the term duck test.

Amid charges in Guatemala that Patterson was intervening in Guatemala's internal affairs, and rumors that Patterson's life was in danger, Patterson hurriedly departed for the United States on March 28, 1950. His mission in Guatemala was terminated on April 24, 1951, when a new ambassador, Rudolf E. Schoenfeld, presented his credentials.

Diplomatic posts
Preceded by Lincoln MacVeagh	United States Ambassador to Yugoslavia; 1944–1946	Succeeded by Cavendish W. Cannon
Preceded by Edwin Jackson Kyle	United States Ambassador to Guatemala; 1948–1951	Succeeded by Rudolf E. Schoenfeld
