= Andrew H. Berding =

7th Assistant Secretary of State for Public Affairs
- In office March 28, 1957 – March 9, 1961
- Preceded by: Carl McCardle
- Succeeded by: Roger Tubby

Personal details
- Born: February 8, 1902
- Died: August 23, 1989 (aged 87)
- Education: University of Oxford

Andrew Henry Berding (February 8, 1902 – August 23, 1989) was United States Assistant Secretary of State for Public Affairs from 1957 to 1961.

== Biography ==
Berding was educated at the University of Oxford. He worked as a newspaper correspondent and writer. During World War II, he served in the Office of Strategic Services as assistant chief of staff of OSS/X-2 Germany, with the rank of lieutenant colonel. He later served in the Bureau of Public Affairs of the United States Department of State as Deputy Director of the Office of Information. Berding was an active member of the Cosmos Club.

President of the United States Dwight Eisenhower nominated Berding as Assistant Secretary of State for Public Affairs in 1957, and Berding subsequently held this office from March 28, 1957, until March 9, 1961.

== Works by Andrew H. Berding ==
- Dulles on Diplomacy (Princeton, NJ: D. Van Nostrand, 1965)
- The Making of the Foreign Policy (Calcutta, India: Academic International, 1967)

Government offices
Preceded by Carl McCardle	Assistant Secretary of State for Public Affairs; March 28, 1957 – March 9, 1961	Succeeded by Roger Tubby
