= Edward W. Barrett =

American journalist (1910–1989)

Edward Ware Barrett

4th Assistant Secretary of State for Public Affairs
- In office February 16, 1950 – February 20, 1952
- Preceded by: George V. Allen
- Succeeded by: Howland H. Sargeant

Personal details
- Born: July 3, 1910 Birmingham, Alabama, U.S.
- Died: October 3, 1989 (aged 79)
- Education: Princeton University (BA)

Edward Ware Barrett (July 3, 1910 – October 3, 1989) was an American journalist who was Assistant Secretary of State for Public Affairs from 1950 to 1952, and Dean of the Columbia University Graduate School of Journalism from 1956 to 1968, in which capacity he founded the Columbia Journalism Review in 1961.

== Biography ==
Barrett was born on July 3, 1910, in Birmingham, Alabama, where his father was editor of the Birmingham Age-Herald. He was educated at Princeton University, graduating with a B.A. in public and international affairs in 1932. During his time at Princeton, he was editor of The Daily Princetonian.

After college, Barrett worked briefly for CBS, before joining Newsweek as a researcher-writer; later, he became the magazine's Washington correspondent and then its national affairs editor. He moved to Today magazine in 1937, but Today merged with Newsweek later in 1937, and he was therefore back at Newsweek. Barrett originated the "Periscope" feature at Newsweek.

During World War II, Barrett joined the Office of the Coordinator of Information, which later became the Office of Strategic Services. Later in 1942, he became chief of the overseas news and features division of the Office of War Information. After the war, Barrett returned to Newsweek in 1946.

In 1950, President of the United States Harry S. Truman named Barrett Assistant Secretary of State for Public Affairs and Barrett held this office from February 16, 1950, until February 20, 1952. After his time at the United States Department of State, Barrett founded his own public relations firm, Edward W. Barrett and Associates. In 1953, he published a memoir entitled Truth Is Our Weapon recounting his experiences during World War II. He joined Hill & Knowlton as executive vice president in 1956.

In 1956, Barrett became Dean of the Columbia University Graduate School of Journalism, a post he would hold until 1968, when he resigned. He explained, somewhat cryptically, that his resignation had to do with the Columbia student riots of that year.

He founded the Columbia Journalism Review in 1961. In 1963, he published a second book, entitled Journalism in Action.

Barrett died at Greenwich Hospital in Greenwich, Connecticut on October 23, 1989, at the age of 79.

Government offices
Preceded by George V. Allen	Assistant Secretary of State for Public Affairs; February 16, 1950 – February 20, 1952	Succeeded by Howland H. Sargeant
