= Cavendish W. Cannon =

American diplomat (1895-1962)

Cavendish Cannon

United States Ambassador to Morocco
- In office October 6, 1956 – July 1, 1958
- President: Dwight D. Eisenhower
- Preceded by: William J. Porter (Chargé d'Affaires)
- Succeeded by: Charles Yost

United States Ambassador to Greece
- In office September 2, 1953 – July 28, 1956
- President: Dwight D. Eisenhower
- Preceded by: John Emil Peurifoy
- Succeeded by: George V. Allen

United States Ambassador to Portugal
- In office June 2, 1952 – August 1, 1953
- President: Harry S. Truman; Dwight D. Eisenhower
- Preceded by: Lincoln MacVeagh
- Succeeded by: M. Robert Guggenheim

United States Envoy to Syria
- In office October 30, 1950 – May 8, 1952
- President: Harry S. Truman
- Preceded by: James Hugh Keeley, Jr.
- Succeeded by: James S. Moose, Jr.

United States Ambassador to Yugoslavia
- In office July 14, 1947 – October 19, 1949
- President: Harry S. Truman
- Preceded by: Richard C. Patterson, Jr.
- Succeeded by: George V. Allen

Personal details
- Born: February 1, 1895 Salt Lake City, Utah
- Died: October 7, 1962 (aged 67) Morón Air Base, near Morón de la Frontera, Spain 37°10′N 5°36′W
- Spouse: Lilla Horzetsky (m. 1921)
- Relatives: John Q. Cannon (Father); George Q. Cannon (Grandfather); Daniel H. Wells (Grandfather)
- Education: University of Utah; University of Paris

Military service
- Allegiance: United States
- Branch/service: United States Marine Corps
- Years of service: 1917
- Battles/wars: World War I

Cavendish Wells Cannon (February 1, 1895 – October 7, 1962) was a long-time United States foreign service officer and diplomat.

== Early life ==
Cannon was born in Salt Lake City in 1895 to newspaper editor John Q. Cannon and Utah State Representative Annie Wells Cannon.

=== Family history ===
He was the grandson of Salt Lake City Mayor and Lieutenant General Daniel H. Wells and US Delegate to the U.S. House of Representatives from Utah Territory's at-large district and prominent LDS early member George Q. Cannon. Daniel was a descendant of English immigrant Thomas Welles, an early Colonial Governor of Connecticut and John Webster, 5th Governor of Connecticut. George Cannon immigrated from England in 1842.

=== Education and military service ===
He went through the Salt Lake City School District, then graduated from University of Utah. He also taught school in Hyrum. On June 17, 1917, he joined the United States Marine Corps during World War I. At the end of the war he remained in Paris to study at University of Paris.

== State Department service ==
During World War II, Cavendish served as the Assistant Chief of the State Department's Division of Southern European Affairs.

Cannon served as US Ambassador to Yugoslavia from 1947 to 1949, then as Envoy to Syria from 1950 to 1952, then US Ambassador to Portugal from 1952 to 1953, then US Ambassador to Greece from 1953 to 1956 and finally as US Ambassador to Morocco from 1956 to 1958. Among his fellow ambassadors in Yugoslavia was the Czechoslovak Ambassador Josef Korbel (father of Madeleine Albright). Cannon spoke in favor of Korbel's pro-democratic leanings when he was trying to gain asylum in the United States. In 1948, he was the chair of the US delegation to the Danube River Conference of 1948.

== Personal life ==
Cannon was a member of the Church of Jesus Christ of Latter-day Saints. He married Marie Lucia Otilie "Lilla" Horzetsky in January 1921. He died of a heart attack at Morón Air Base, near Morón de la Frontera, Spain just a few days after having a gallbladder surgery. He was later interred in Seville, Spain.
