= List of ambassadors of the United States to Yugoslavia =

Ambassador of the United States to Yugoslavia
- Seal of the United States Department of State
- Incumbent; None
- Nominator: The president of the United States
- Inaugural holder: Henry Percival Dodge as Envoy Extraordinary and Minister Plenipotentiary
- Formation: July 17, 1919
- Abolished: February 4, 2003 (as Yugoslavia); February 29, 2004 (as Serbia and Montenegro)

The nation of Yugoslavia was formed on December 1, 1918, as a result of the realignment of nations and national boundaries in Europe in the aftermath of World War I. The nation was first named the Kingdom of Serbs, Croats and Slovenes and was renamed the Kingdom of Yugoslavia in 1929. The kingdom occupied the area in the Balkans comprising the present-day states of Bosnia and Herzegovina, Serbia, Montenegro, North Macedonia, and most of present-day Slovenia and Croatia. The United States recognized the newly formed nation and commissioned its first envoy to the kingdom on July 17, 1919. Previously the U.S. had had an envoy extraordinary and minister plenipotentiary who was commissioned to Romania, Bulgaria, and Serbia while resident in Bucharest, Romania. Towards the end of the 1930s, the diplomatic relations between Belgrade and Washington were raised from ministerial to the ambassadorial level.

At the beginning of World War II, the government of Yugoslavia fled Belgrade and formed a government in exile in London and later in Cairo. During that time the U.S. ambassadors continued to represent the United States in London and Cairo. The embassy was transferred back to Belgrade in 1945.

Between 1943 and 1992 the nation was known by various names, including the Democratic Federative Yugoslavia (1943), the Federal People's Republic of Yugoslavia (1946), and the Socialist Federal Republic of Yugoslavia (1963).

After the breakup of the Socialist Federal Republic of Yugoslavia in 1992, the remnants of the nation, comprising the republics of Serbia and Montenegro, constituted a new state known as the Federal Republic of Yugoslavia. On May 21, 1992, the United States announced that it did not recognize the Federal Republic. The ambassador had left Belgrade one week earlier. A series of chargés d'affaires represented the U.S. government until 1999, when the embassy was closed.

In 2001 the United States recognized the Federal Republic of Yugoslavia and commissioned an ambassador to Belgrade.

In 2003 the parliament of the Federal Republic of Yugoslavia ratified the Constitutional Charter, establishing a new state union and changing the name of the country from Yugoslavia to Serbia and Montenegro. The U.S. ambassador continued in his post as the ambassador to Serbia and Montenegro.

For ambassadors to Serbia before and after Yugoslavia, see United States Ambassador to Serbia.

== Ambassadors ==
Image	Name	Title	Appointed	Presented credentials	Terminated mission	Notes
	Henry Percival Dodge – Career FSO	Envoy Extraordinary and Minister Plenipotentiary	July 17, 1919	October 5, 1919	March 21, 1926	
	John Dyneley Prince – Political appointee	Envoy Extraordinary and Minister Plenipotentiary	February 23, 1926	May 5, 1926	August 31, 1932	
	Charles S. Wilson – Career FSO	Envoy Extraordinary and Minister Plenipotentiary	August 3, 1933	September 11, 1933	July 28, 1937	
	Arthur Bliss Lane – Career FSO	Envoy Extraordinary and Minister Plenipotentiary	August 9, 1937	October 23, 1937	May 17, 1941	
	Anthony J. Drexel Biddle, Jr. – Political appointee	Ambassador Extraordinary and Plenipotentiary	July 30, 1941	October 3, 1941	September 28, 1943	Promoted to Ambassador Extraordinary and Plenipotentiary September 1942
	Lincoln MacVeagh – Political appointee	Ambassador Extraordinary and Plenipotentiary	November 12, 1943	December 9, 1943	March 11, 1944	
	Richard C. Patterson, Jr. – Political appointee	Ambassador Extraordinary and Plenipotentiary	September 21, 1944	November 17, 1944	Left Belgrade October 25, 1946	
	Cavendish W. Cannon – Career FSO	Ambassador Extraordinary and Plenipotentiary	April 10, 1947	July 14, 1947	October 19, 1949	
	George V. Allen – Career FSO	Ambassador Extraordinary and Plenipotentiary	October 27, 1949	January 25, 1950	March 11, 1953	
	James Williams Riddleberger – Career FSO	Ambassador Extraordinary and Plenipotentiary	July 31, 1953	November 16, 1953	January 11, 1958	
	Karl L. Rankin – Career FSO	Ambassador Extraordinary and Plenipotentiary	December 13, 1957	February 19, 1958	April 22, 1961	
	George F. Kennan – Career FSO	Ambassador Extraordinary and Plenipotentiary	March 7, 1961	May 16, 1961	July 28, 1963	
	Charles Burke Elbrick – Career FSO	Ambassador Extraordinary and Plenipotentiary	January 29, 1964	March 17, 1964	April 28, 1969	
	William K. Leonhart – Career FSO	Ambassador Extraordinary and Plenipotentiary	May 1, 1969	June 30, 1969	October 18, 1971	
	Malcolm Toon – Career FSO	Ambassador Extraordinary and Plenipotentiary	October 7, 1971	October 23, 1971	March 11, 1975	
	Laurence H. Silberman - Political appointee	Ambassador Extraordinary and Plenipotentiary	May 8, 1975	May 26, 1975	December 26, 1976	
	Lawrence S. Eagleburger – Career FSO	Ambassador Extraordinary and Plenipotentiary	June 8, 1977	June 21, 1977	January 24, 1981	
	David Anderson – Career FSO	Ambassador Extraordinary and Plenipotentiary	July 27, 1981	August 19, 1981	June 26, 1985	
	John Douglas Scanlan – Career FSO	Ambassador Extraordinary and Plenipotentiary	July 12, 1985	July 26, 1985	March 6, 1989	
	Warren Zimmermann – Career FSO	Ambassador Extraordinary and Plenipotentiary	July 11, 1988	March 21, 1989	May 16, 1992	The United States announced on May 21, 1992, that it would not recognize the Federal Republic of Yugoslavia, comprising the republics of Serbia and Montenegro, as the successor to the Socialist Federal Republic of Yugoslavia.
	Robert Rackmales	Chargés d'affaires ad interim	May 1992	N/A	July 1993	
	Rudolf V. Perina	Chargés d'affaires ad interim	July 1993	N/A	February 1996	
	Lawrence Butler	Chargés d'affaires ad interim	February 1996	N/A	August 1996	
	Richard M. Miles	Chargés d'affaires ad interim	August 1996	N/A	March 1999	The embassy was closed March 23, 1999. Miles and the last Embassy personnel left March 24, and NATO armed forces began military action against Serbia-Montenegro that evening.
	William Dale Montgomery – Career FSO	Ambassador Extraordinary and Plenipotentiary	November 26, 2001	January 4, 2002	February 29, 2004	The United States again recognized the Federal Republic of Yugoslavia in 2001 and posted an ambassador to that nation.

Montgomery was the last ambassador sent by the U.S. to a state known as Yugoslavia. Hereafter ambassadors in Belgrade were commissioned to Serbia and Montenegro until 2006, and then to Serbia onward. For subsequent ambassadors in Belgrade, see United States Ambassador to Serbia.

== See also ==
- Socialist Federal Republic of Yugoslavia
- Federal Republic of Yugoslavia
- United States Ambassador to Bosnia and Herzegovina
- United States Ambassador to Croatia
- United States Ambassador to Montenegro
- United States Ambassador to North Macedonia
- United States Ambassador to Serbia
- United States Ambassador to Slovenia
