= Samuel E. Thorne =

American legal historian

Samuel Edmund Thorne (October 14, 1907 – April 7, 1994) was an American legal historian. The editor of many English legal manuscripts, he is best known for his translation, with annotations, of Bracton's De legibus et consuetudinibus Angliae (1968–1977), generally considered to be the definitive one.

== Life and career ==
Thorne was educated at the City College of New York and Harvard Law School. He was librarian and professor at Northwestern University School of Law from 1934 to 1942, when he took a leave of absence to serve in the United States Navy as a cryptoanalyst, achieving the rank of lieutenant commander. After World War II, Thorne joined Yale Law School as librarian in 1945. He was elected to the American Academy of Arts and Sciences in 1956. That same year, Thorne joined Harvard University as Professor of Law and History, and retired in 1978. He was an elected member of the American Philosophical Society.

Thorne married Margaret Ewen MacVeagh, the daughter of Lincoln MacVeagh.

A festschrift in his honor, On the Laws and Customs of England: Essays in Honor of Samuel E. Thorne, was published in 1981.

== Works ==
- Bracton, On the Laws and Customs of England, 4 vol. (editor) (1968–1977)
- Essays in English Legal History (1984)
