= George V. Allen =

American diplomat (1903–1970)

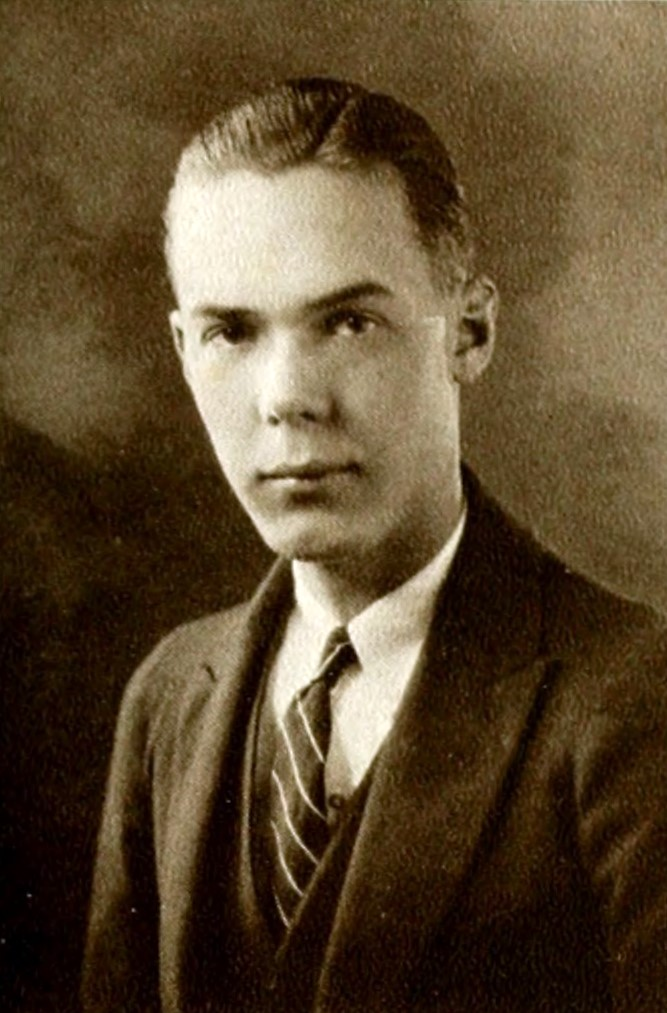
- 1924 Duke University Senior Yearbook Photo

United States Ambassador to Iran
- In office April 23, 1946 – February 17, 1948
- President: Harry S. Truman
- Preceded by: Wallace Murray
- Succeeded by: John C. Wiley

United States Ambassador to Yugoslavia
- In office October 27, 1949 – March 11, 1953
- President: Harry S. Truman
- Preceded by: Cavendish W. Cannon
- Succeeded by: James Williams Riddleberger

United States Ambassador to India
- In office March 11, 1953 – November 30, 1954
- President: Dwight D. Eisenhower
- Preceded by: Chester Bowles
- Succeeded by: John Sherman Cooper

United States Ambassador to Nepal
- In office March 11, 1953 – November 30, 1954
- President: Dwight D. Eisenhower
- Preceded by: Chester Bowles
- Succeeded by: John Cooper

United States Ambassador to Greece
- In office July 26, 1956 – November 13, 1957
- President: Dwight D. Eisenhower
- Preceded by: Cavendish W. Cannon
- Succeeded by: James Williams Riddleberger

3rd Assistant Secretary of State for Near Eastern, South Asian, and African Affairs
- In office January 26, 1955 – August 27, 1956
- Preceded by: Henry A. Byroade
- Succeeded by: William M. Rountree

3rd Assistant Secretary of State for Public Affairs
- In office March 31, 1948 – November 28, 1949
- Preceded by: William Benton
- Succeeded by: Edward W. Barrett

Personal details
- Born: November 3, 1903 Durham, North Carolina, U.S.
- Died: July 11, 1970 (aged 66) Bahama, North Carolina, U.S.
- Resting place: Rock Creek Cemetery
- Education: Duke University

George Venable Allen (November 3, 1903 – July 11, 1970) was a United States diplomat. He served as ambassador to Iran during the crisis of 1946 and was involved in managing American relations amid the Cold War with the Soviet Union. He was involved in expanding activities of the Voice of America, exporting culture, and increasing U.S. participation in UNESCO.

== Early life and career ==
Born in Durham, North Carolina, son of merchant Thomas Ellis Allen and Harriet Moore, he attended Duke University—then known as Trinity College—graduating in 1924 and from Harvard University in 1929. He worked briefly as a high school teacher between 1924 and 1928 and as a newspaper reporter for the Asheville Times and Durham Herald.

He joined the Foreign Service in 1930, working first as vice consul in Kingston, Jamaica and later in Shanghai, China; Patras, Greece; and Cairo, Egypt. He served as U.S. Ambassador to Iran from 1946 to 1948. During this period he worked on preventing a Soviet-Iran oil agreement and led to the Iranian prime minister Ahmad Qavam dropping communist cabinet members. He also helped build ties with Shah Mohammed Reza Pahlavi, playing weekly tennis matches with the monarch. He served as Assistant Secretary of State for Public Affairs from 1948 to 1949, U.S. Ambassador to Yugoslavia from 1949 to 1953, and United States Ambassador to India and Nepal from 1953 to 1954. While in India he, along with Dwight D. Eisenhower, supported India's rival, Pakistan, with military support as a deterrent against Soviet relations with India. He then served as Assistant Secretary of State for Near Eastern, South Asian, and African Affairs from 1953 to 1954, U.S. Ambassador to Greece from 1956 to 1957, and Director of the U.S. Information Agency from 1957 to 1960. In 1960, Allen was named Career Ambassador.

Allen was president of the Tobacco Institute from 1960 to 1966. He defended the tobacco industry as early reports of links between cigarette smoking and cancer began to emerge.

In 1966, Allen returned to the State Department as the Director of the Foreign Service Institute. He retired in 1968.

== Personal life ==
Despite working in the private sector from 1960 to 1966, Allen remained involved in foreign affairs. From 1961 to 1962, Allen was on the Committee on Foreign Affairs Personnel, which was involved in Cold War anticommunism. He was also sworn in as President of Diplomatic and Consular Officers, Retired (DACOR) in April of 1964.

Allen appeared as himself, while serving as the Director of the Foreign Service Institute, on the February 6, 1967 episode of the game show To Tell the Truth. He deceived none, receiving all four votes from the panel.

He married Katharine Martin in 1934, author of a self-published book on their lives overseas, Foreign Service Diary. They had three children, George V. Allen, Jr., John M. Allen and Richard A. Allen, all lawyers in Washington, D.C. He died at Bahama, North Carolina and is interred in Rock Creek Cemetery in Washington D.C.

== Notes ==
Diplomatic posts
Preceded by Wallace Murray	U.S. Ambassador to Iran; 1946–1948	Succeeded by John C. Wiley
Preceded by Cavendish W. Cannon	U.S. Ambassador to Yugoslavia; 1949–1953	Succeeded by James Williams Riddleberger
Preceded by Chester Bowles	U.S. Ambassador to India; Also accredited to Nepal; 1953–1954	Succeeded by John Sherman Cooper
Preceded by Cavendish W. Cannon	U.S. Ambassador to Greece; 1956–1957	Succeeded by James Williams Riddleberger
Government offices
Preceded by William Benton	Assistant Secretary of State for Public Affairs; March 31, 1948 – November 28, 1949	Succeeded by Edward W. Barrett
Preceded by Henry A. Byroade	Assistant Secretary of State for Near Eastern, South Asian, and African Affairs; January 26, 1955 – August 27, 1956	Succeeded by William M. Rountree
