= Myrna Loy =

American actress (1905–1993)

- Loy in 1941
- Born: Myrna Adele Williams; August 2, 1905; Helena, Montana, U.S.
- Died: December 14, 1993 (aged 88); New York City, U.S.
- Resting place: Forestvale Cemetery; Helena, Montana, U.S. 46.6562°N 112.0365°W
- Occupation: Actress
- Years active: 1925–1982
- Political party: Democratic
- Spouses: Arthur Hornblow Jr. (m. 1936; div. 1942) John Hertz, Jr. (m. 1942; div. 1944) Gene Markey (m. 1946; div. 1950) Howland H. Sargeant (m. 1951; div. 1960)

Myrna Loy (born Myrna Adele Williams; August 2, 1905 – December 14, 1993) was an American film, television, and stage actress. As a performer, she was known for her ability to adapt to her screen partner's acting style.

Born in Helena, Montana, Loy was raised in rural Radersburg and Helena. She relocated to Los Angeles with her mother in early adolescence and trained as a dancer in high school. She was discovered by production designer Natacha Rambova, who organized film auditions for her. She began obtaining small roles in the late 1920s. Loy devoted herself fully to acting after a few roles in silent films. She was originally typecast in exotic roles, often as a vamp or a woman of Asian descent, but her career prospects improved greatly following her portrayal of Nora Charles in The Thin Man (1934). The role helped elevate her reputation, and she became known as a versatile actress adept at both drama and comedy; she would play the role of Nora Charles five more times.

Loy's performances peaked in the 1940s, with films like The Thin Man Goes Home, The Best Years of Our Lives, The Bachelor and the Bobby-Soxer, and Mr. Blandings Builds His Dream House. In the 1950s, she appeared in a lead role in the comedy Cheaper by the Dozen (1950), as well as supporting roles in The Ambassador's Daughter (1956) and the drama Lonelyhearts (1958). She appeared in eight films between 1960 and 1981, after which she retired from acting.

Although Loy was never nominated for an Academy Award, in March 1991, she received an Honorary Academy Award in recognition of her life's work both onscreen and off, including serving as assistant to the director of military and naval welfare for the Red Cross during World War II, and a member-at-large of the U.S. Commission to UNESCO. In 2009, The Guardian named her one of the best actors never to have received an Academy Award nomination. Loy died in December 1993 in New York City at age 88.

== Life and career ==
=== 1905–1924: Early life ===
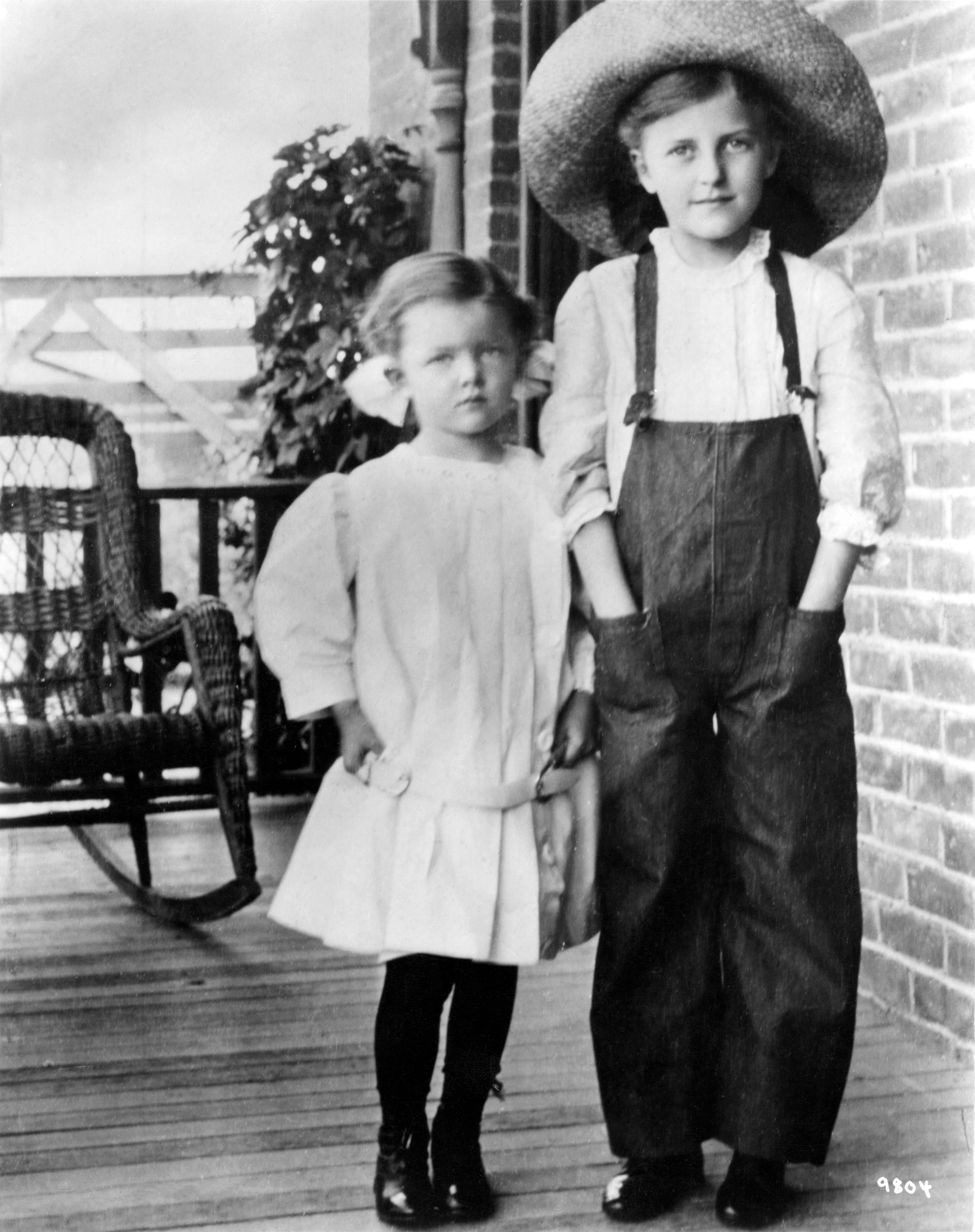
Loy (left) at age six, standing on her grandmother's porch in Helena, Montana, with her cousin Laura Belle Wilder (1911)

Loy was born Myrna Adele Williams on August 2, 1905, in Helena, Montana, the daughter of Adelle Mae (née Johnson) and rancher David Franklin Williams. Her parents had married in Helena in 1904, one year before Loy was born. She had one younger brother, David Frederick Williams (1911–1983). Loy's paternal grandfather, David Thomas Williams, was Welsh and had left Liverpool, England to immigrate to the United States in 1856, arriving in Philadelphia. Unable to read or write in English, he later settled in the Montana Territory, where he began a career as a rancher. Loy's maternal grandparents were Scottish and Swedish immigrants. During her childhood, her father worked as a banker, real estate developer, and farmland appraiser in Helena and was the youngest man ever elected to serve in the Montana state legislature. Her mother had studied music at the American Conservatory of Music in Chicago and at one time considered a career as a concert performer, but instead devoted her time to raising Loy and her brother. Loy's mother was a staunch Democrat, while her father was a lifelong Republican. She was raised in the Methodist faith.

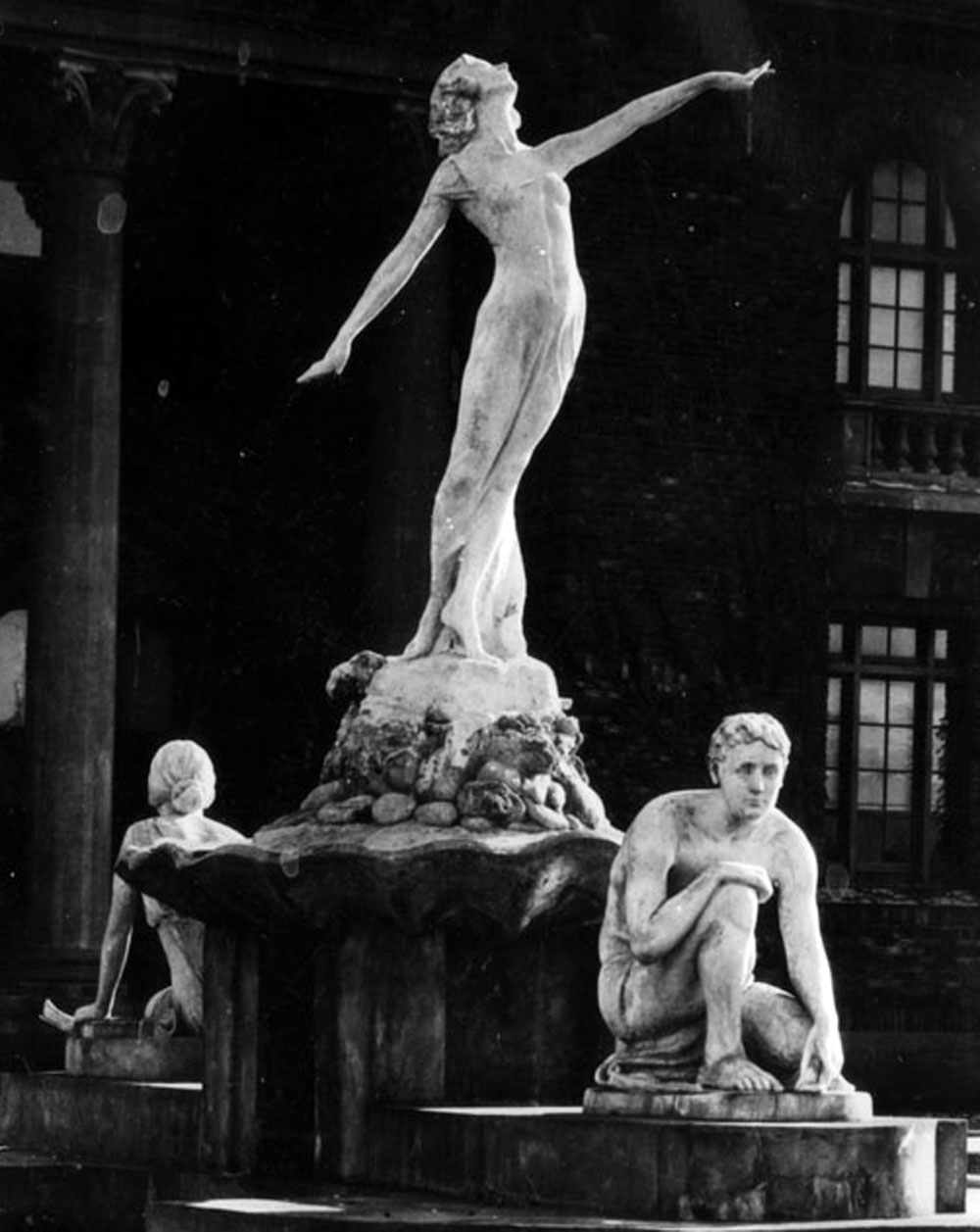
Loy modeled for the central figure in Harry Fielding Winebrenner's Fountain of Education, a sculpture at Venice High School in Los Angeles (1922)

Loy spent her early life in Radersburg, Montana, a rural mining community about 50 miles (80 km) southeast of Helena. During the winter of 1912, Loy's mother nearly died from pneumonia, and her father sent his wife and daughter to La Jolla, California. Loy's mother saw great potential in Southern California, and during one of her husband's visits, she encouraged him to purchase real estate there. Among the properties he bought was land that he would later sell, at a considerable profit, to filmmaker Charlie Chaplin for his film studio there. Although her mother tried to persuade her husband to move to California permanently, he preferred ranch life and the three eventually returned to Montana. Soon afterward, Loy's mother needed a hysterectomy and insisted Los Angeles was a safer place to have it done, so Loy, Loy's brother David, and she moved to Ocean Park, where Loy began to take dancing lessons. After the family returned to Montana, Loy continued her dancing lessons, and at the age of 12, Myrna Williams made her stage debut performing a dance she had choreographed based on "The Blue Bird" from the Rose Dream operetta at Helena's Marlow Theater.

When Loy was 13, her father died during the 1918 flu pandemic in November of that year. Loy's mother permanently relocated the family to California, where they settled in Culver City, outside Los Angeles. Loy attended the exclusive Westlake School for Girls while continuing to study dance in downtown Los Angeles. When her teachers objected to her extracurricular participation in theatrical arts, her mother enrolled her in Venice High School, and at 15, she began appearing in local stage productions.

In 1921, Loy posed for Venice High School sculpture teacher Harry Fielding Winebrenner as "Inspiration"; the full-length figure was central in his allegorical sculpture group Fountain of Education. Completed in 1922, the sculpture group was installed in front of the campus outdoor pool in May 1923, where it stood for decades. Loy's slender figure with her uplifted face and one arm extending skyward presented a "vision of purity, grace, youthful vigor, and aspiration" that was singled out in a Los Angeles Times story that included a photo of the "Inspiration" figure along with the model's name—the first time her name appeared in a newspaper. A few months later, Loy's "Inspiration" figure was temporarily removed from the sculpture group and transported aboard the battleship Nevada for a Memorial Day pageant in which "Miss Myrna Williams" participated. Fountain of Education can be seen in the opening scenes of the 1978 film Grease. After decades of exposure to the elements and vandalism, the original concrete statue was removed from display in 2002, and replaced in 2010 by a bronze duplicate paid for through an alumni-led fundraising campaign.

Loy left school at 18 to begin to help with the family's finances. She obtained work at Grauman's Egyptian Theatre, where she performed in what were called prologues, elaborate musical sequences that were related to and served as preliminary entertainment before the feature film. During this period, Loy saw Eleonora Duse in the play Thy Will Be Done, and the simple acting techniques she employed made such an impact on Loy that she tried to emulate them throughout her career.

=== 1925–1932: Career beginnings ===
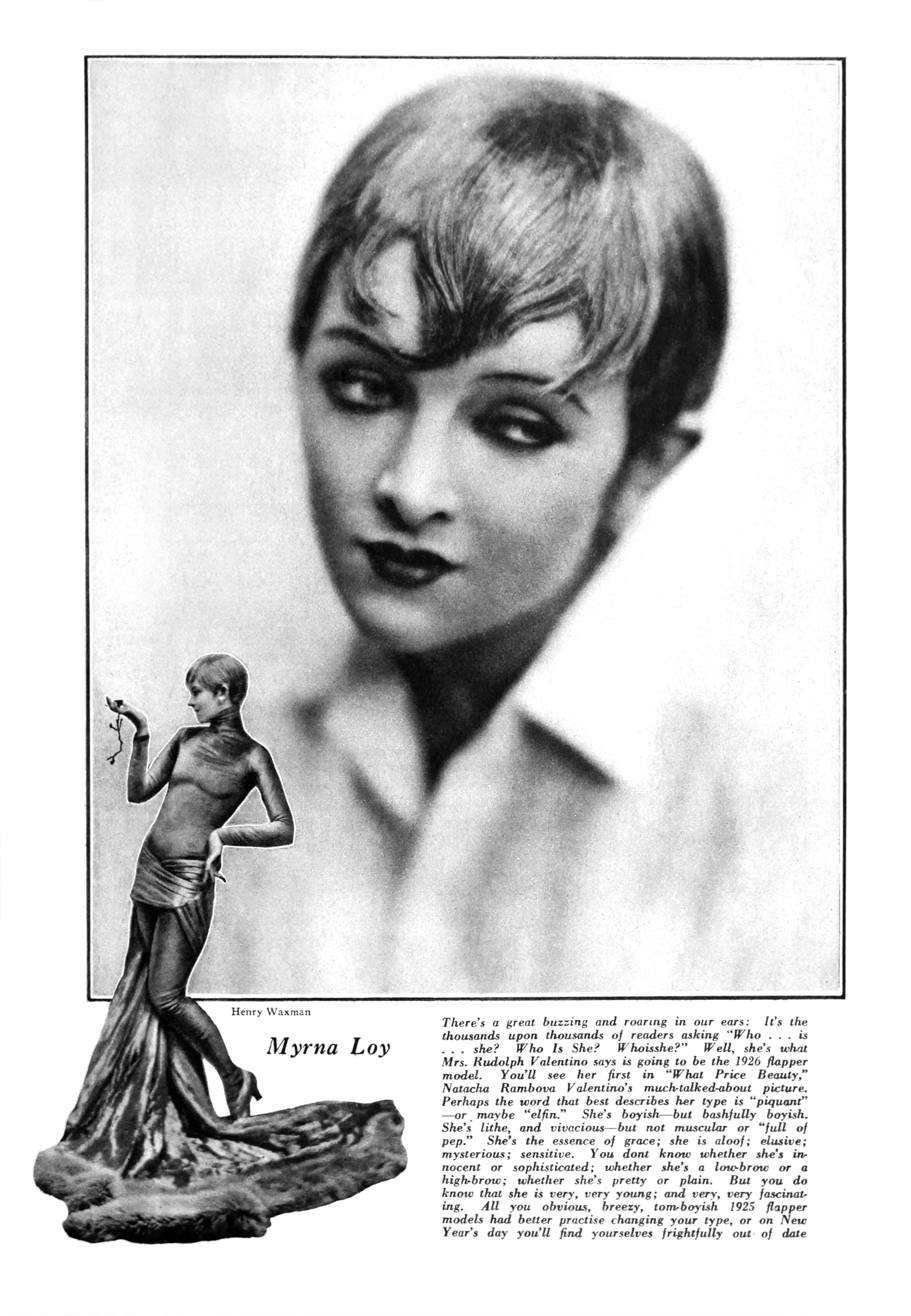
In its September 1925 issue, Motion Picture featured two Henry Waxman photographs of Loy, costumed by Adrian, as she appeared in What Price Beauty?.

While Loy was dancing in prologues at Grauman's Egyptian Theatre, portrait photographer Henry Waxman took several pictures of her that were noticed by Rudolph Valentino when the actor went to Waxman's studio for a sitting. Valentino was looking for a leading lady for Cobra, the first independent project his wife Natacha Rambova and he were producing. Loy tested for the role, which went to Gertrude Olmstead, instead, but soon after that, she was hired as an extra for Pretty Ladies (1925), in which fellow newcomer Joan Crawford and she were among a bevy of chorus girls dangling from an elaborate chandelier. The two of them would share a life-long friendship that lasted until Crawford's death.

Rambova hired Loy for a small but showy role opposite Nita Naldi in What Price Beauty?, a film she was producing. Shot in May 1925, the film remained unreleased for three years, but stills of Loy in her exotic makeup and costume appeared in Motion Picture and led to a contract with Warner Bros. There, her surname was changed from Williams to Loy. The idea for the new name apparently came from screenwriter Peter Ruric, also known as crime novelist Paul Cain, who may have been inspired by the name of British poet Mina Loy.

Loy's silent film roles were mainly as a vamp or femme fatale, and she frequently portrayed characters of Asian or Eurasian background in films such as Across the Pacific (1926), A Girl in Every Port (1928), The Crimson City (1928), The Black Watch (1929), and The Desert Song (1929), which she later recalled "kind of solidified my exotic non-American image." In 1930, she appeared in The Great Divide. It took years for her to overcome this typecasting, and as late as 1932, she was cast as a villainous Eurasian in Thirteen Women (1932) and opposite Boris Karloff as the depraved, sadistic daughter of the title character in The Mask of Fu Manchu (1932).

In spite of this typecasting, Loy also obtained small roles in The Jazz Singer and a number of early lavish Technicolor musicals, including The Show of Shows, The Bride of the Regiment, and Under a Texas Moon. As a result, she became associated with musical roles, and when they began to lose favor with the public, her career went into a slump. In 1934, Loy appeared in Manhattan Melodrama with Clark Gable and William Powell. When gangster John Dillinger was shot to death after leaving a screening of the film at the Biograph Theater in Chicago, the film received widespread publicity, with some newspapers reporting that Loy had been Dillinger's favorite actress.

=== 1933–1938: Rise to stardom ===
After appearing with Ramón Novarro in The Barbarian (1933), Loy was cast as Nora Charles in the 1934 film The Thin Man. Director W. S. Van Dyke chose Loy after he detected a wit and sense of humor that her previous films had not revealed. At a Hollywood party, he pushed her into a swimming pool to test her reaction, and he felt that her aplomb in handling the situation was exactly what he envisioned for Nora. Louis B. Mayer at first refused to allow Loy to play the part because he felt she was a dramatic actress, but Van Dyke insisted. Mayer finally relented on the condition that filming be completed within three weeks, as Loy was committed to start filming Stamboul Quest. The Thin Man became one of the year's biggest hits and was nominated for the Academy Award for Best Picture. Loy received excellent reviews and was acclaimed for her comedic skills. Her costar William Powell and she proved to be a popular screen couple and appeared in 14 films together, one of the most prolific pairings in Hollywood history. Loy later referred to The Thin Man as the film "that finally made me... after more than 80 films."

Her successes in Manhattan Melodrama and The Thin Man marked a turning point in her career, and she was cast in more important pictures. Such films as Wife vs. Secretary (1936) with Clark Gable and Jean Harlow and Petticoat Fever (1936) with Robert Montgomery gave her opportunity to develop comedic skills. She made four films with William Powell in close succession: Libeled Lady (1936) (which also starred Jean Harlow and Spencer Tracy), The Great Ziegfeld (1936) (in which she played Billie Burke opposite Powell's Florenz Ziegfeld), the second Thin Man film -After the Thin Man (1936) (which also starred James Stewart), and the romantic comedy Double Wedding (1937).

In 1932, Loy had begun dating producer Arthur Hornblow Jr., when he was still married to Juliette Crosby: Loy and Hornblow themselves married in 1936, in between filming these four successive productions. She was later rumored to have had affairs with co-star Spencer Tracy between 1935 and 1936, while filming Whipsaw and Libeled Lady. Loy recounted in her autobiography that Tracy chased after her. "'You don't have to worry about me anymore,' he said like a sulky child. 'I've found the woman I want.' As he outlined the virtues of Katharine Hepburn, I was relieved, but also a bit disappointed. As selfish as it sounds, I liked having a man like Spence in the background wanting me. It's rather nice when nothing's required in return."

She also made three more films with Gable at Metro-Goldwyn-Mayer (MGM): Parnell (1937) was a historical drama and one of the most poorly received films of either Loy or Gable's careers, but their other pairings in Test Pilot and Too Hot to Handle (both 1938) were successes. While working for MGM, Loy was outspoken about the studio's casting hierarchy, especially based on race, and she was quoted as saying: "Why does every black person in the movies have to play a servant? How about a black person walking up the steps of a courthouse carrying a briefcase?"

During this period, Loy was one of Hollywood's busiest and highest-paid actresses, and in 1937 and 1938, she was listed in the annual Quigley Poll of the Top Ten Money Making Stars, which was compiled from the votes of movie exhibitors throughout the United States for the stars who had generated the most revenue in their theaters over the previous year.

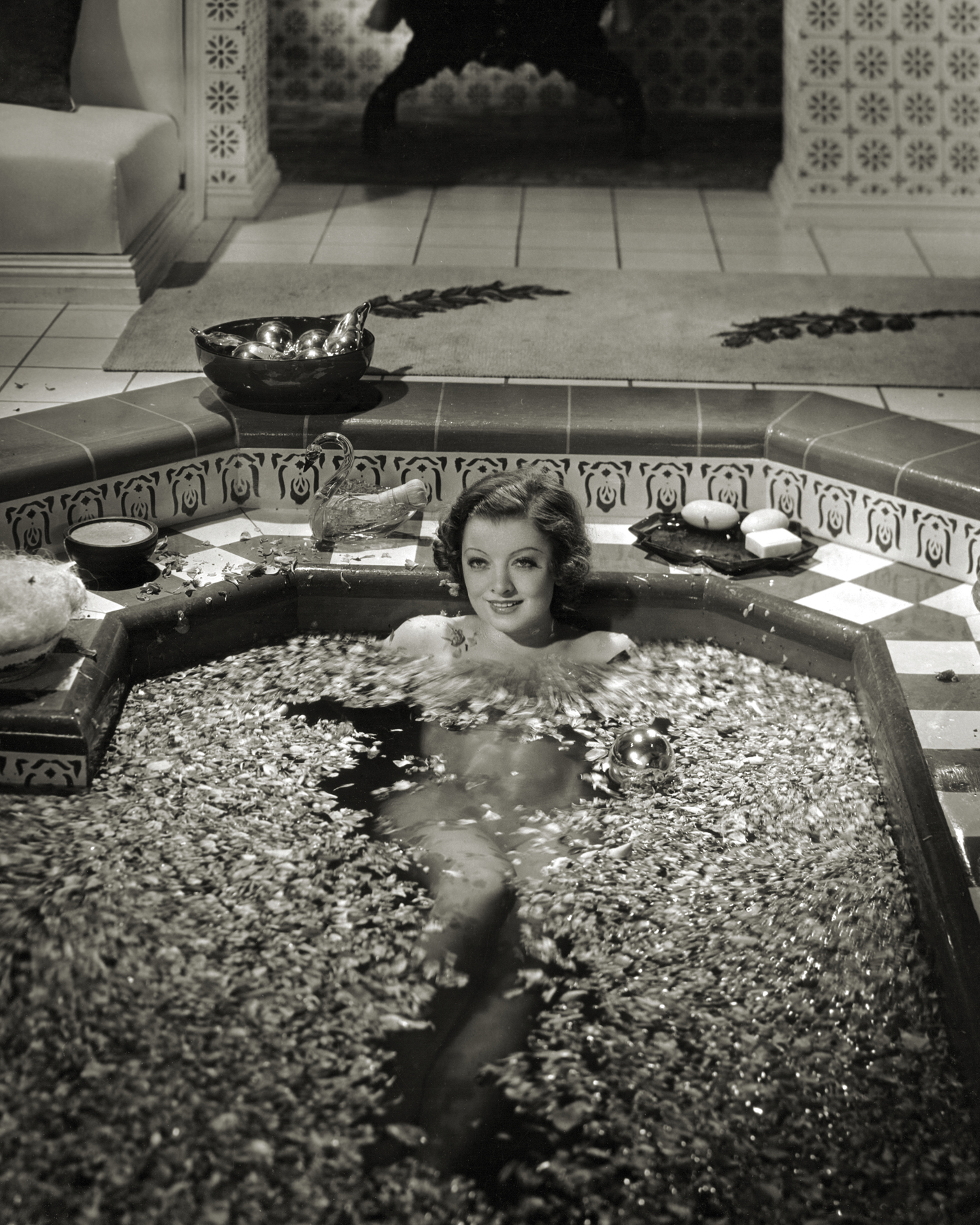
Loy in The Barbarian (1933)

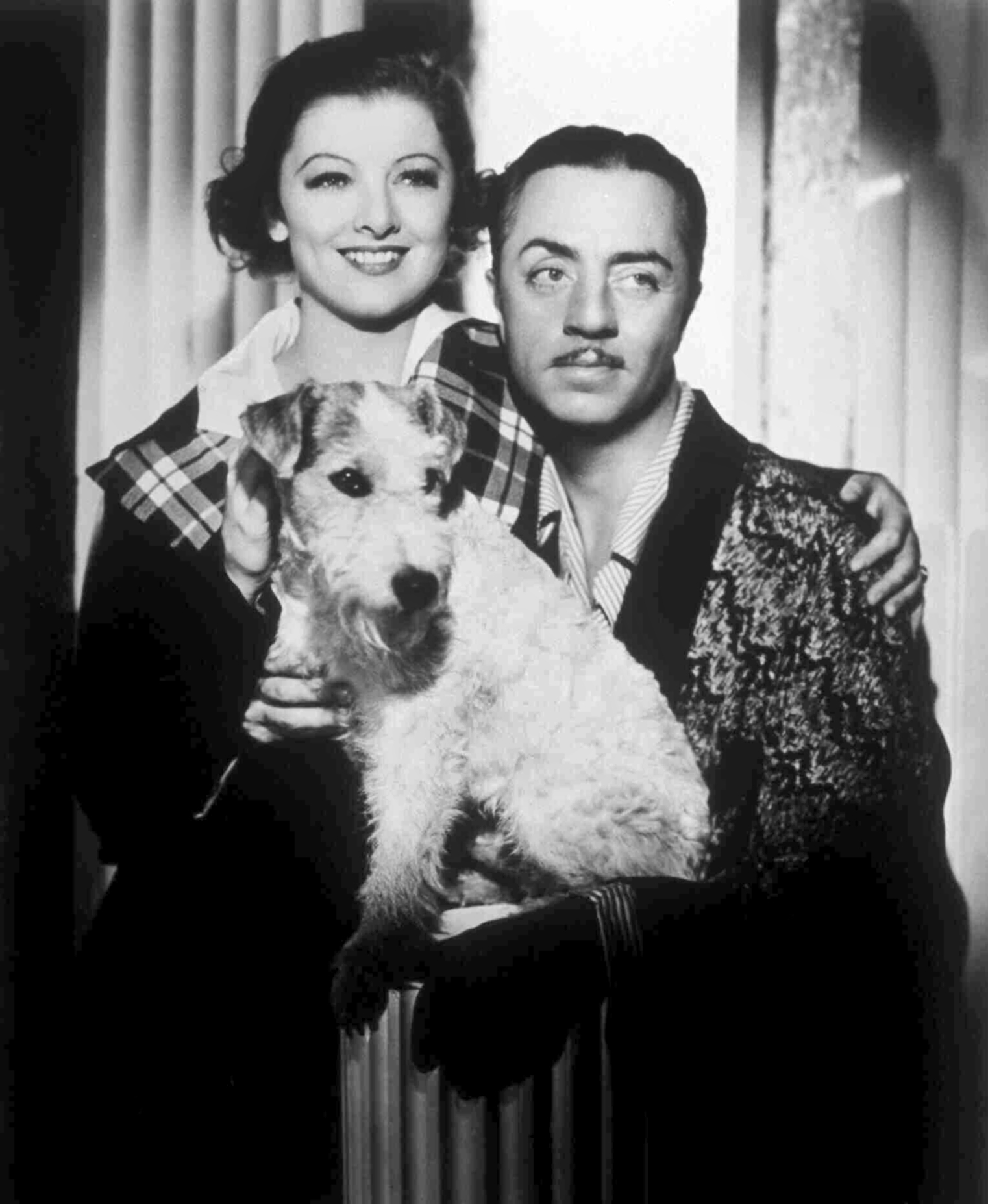
Loy, William Powell and Asta in The Thin Man (1934)

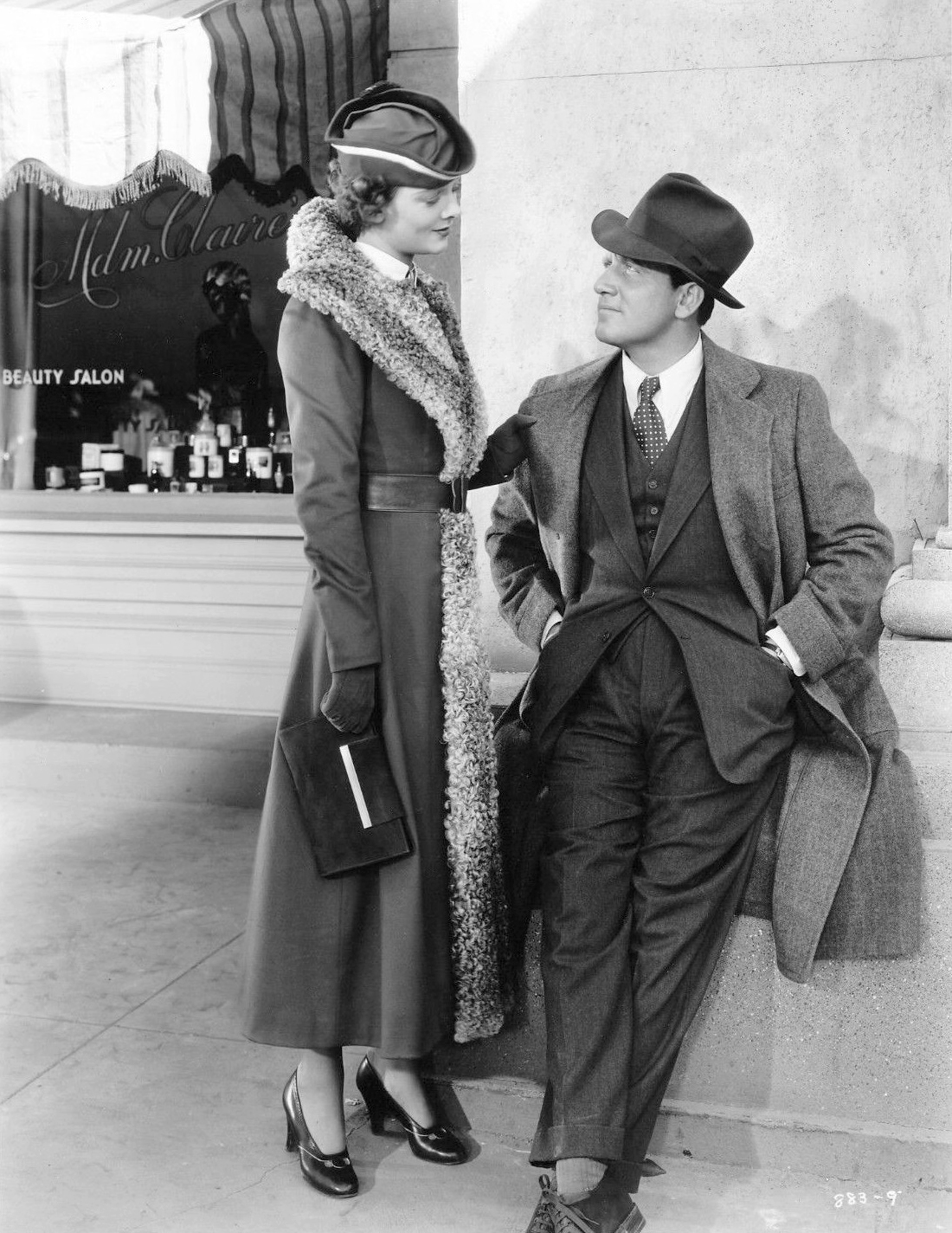
With Spencer Tracy on the set of Whipsaw (1935)

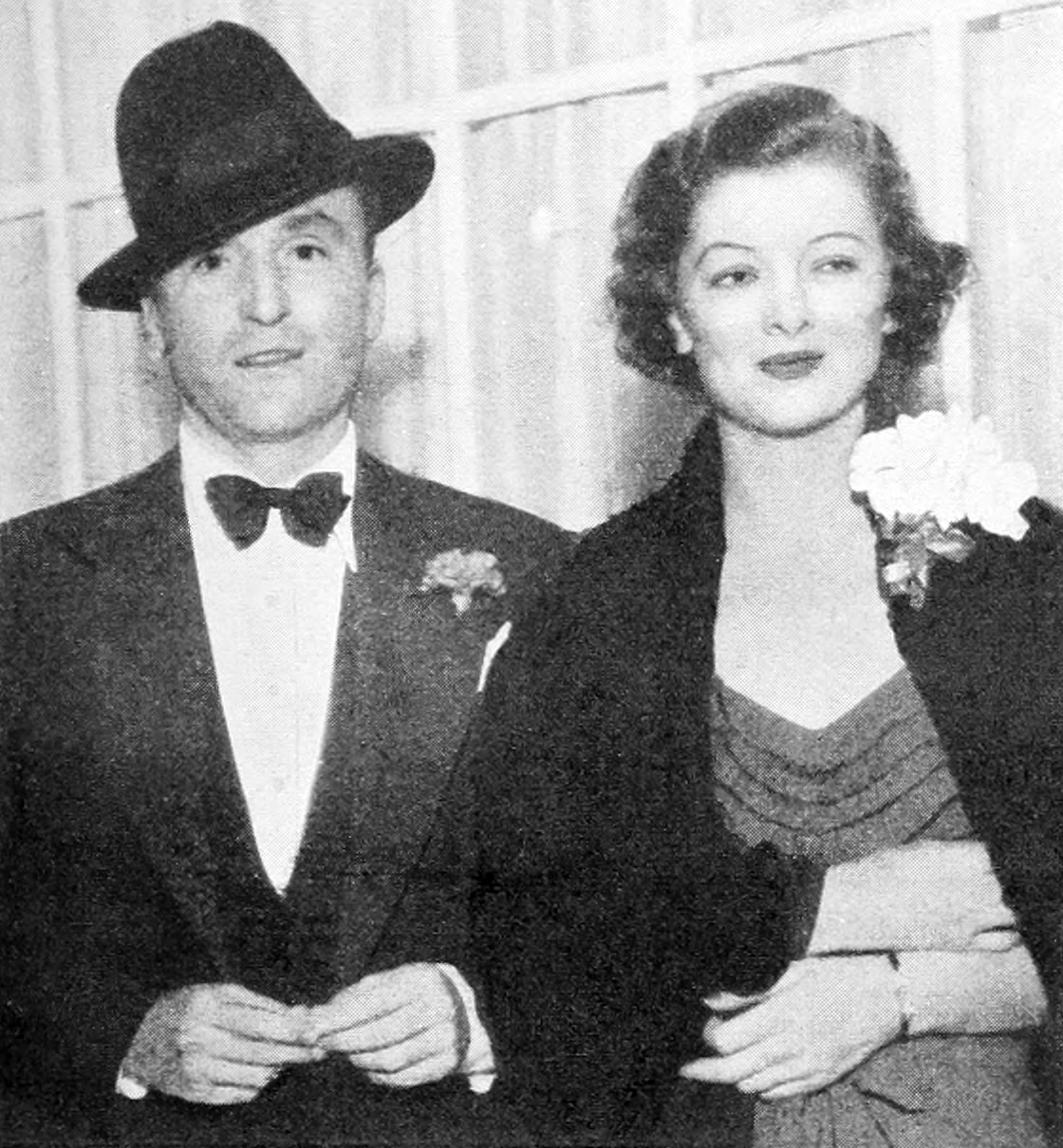
Arthur Hornblow Jr. and Loy soon after their marriage in 1936

=== 1939–1949: Mainstream work and World War II activism ===
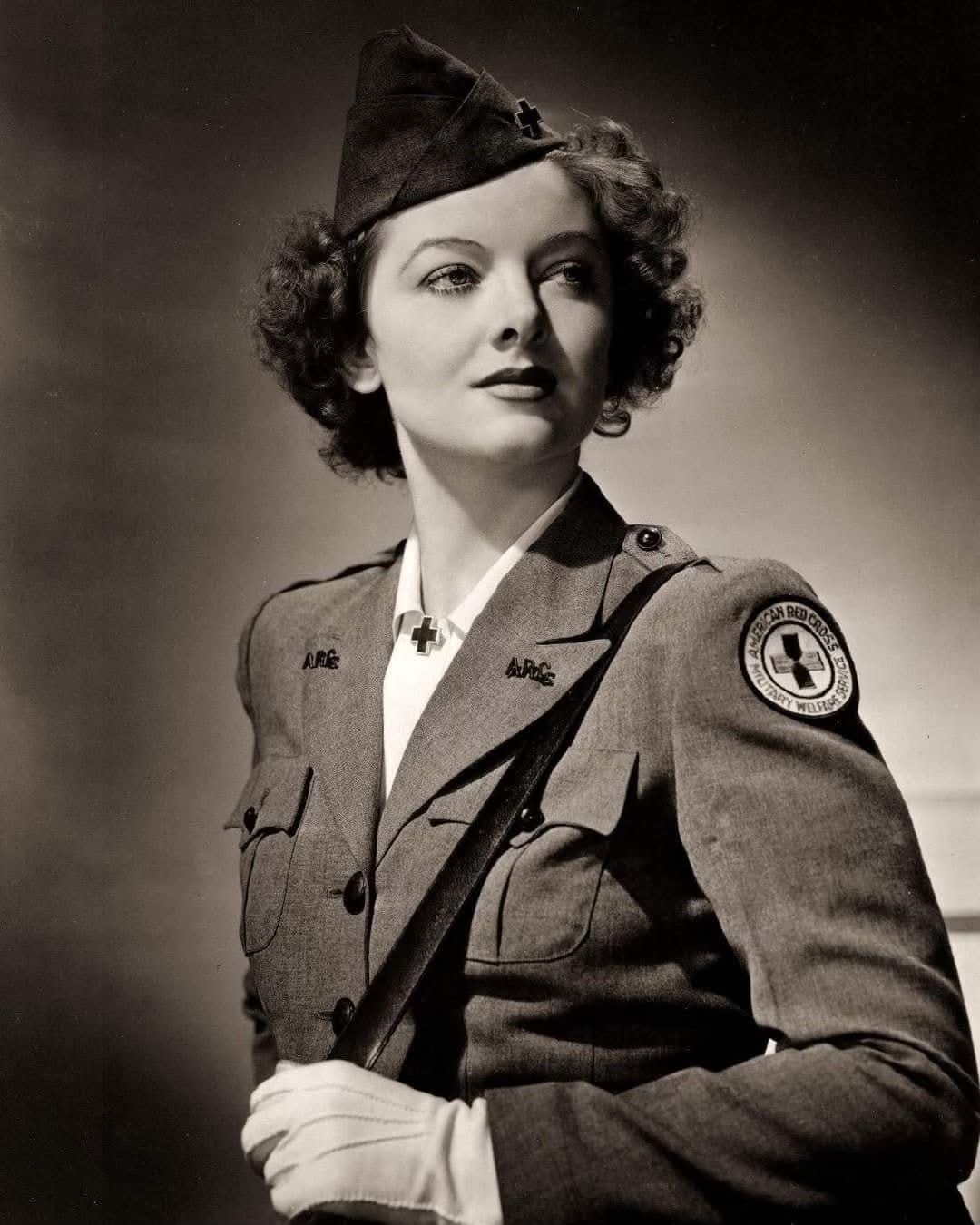
Myrna Loy in Red Cross Uniform (1943)

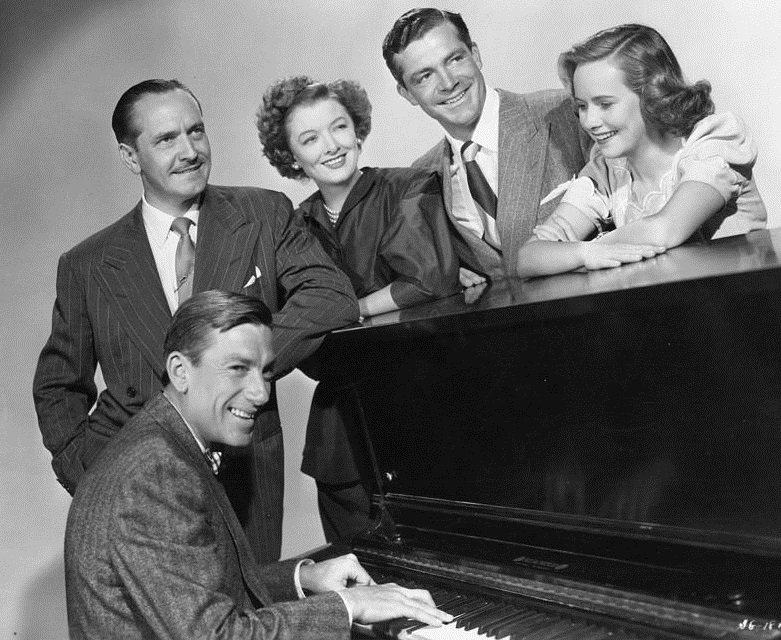
Hoagy Carmichael, Fredric March, Loy, Dana Andrews and Theresa Wright in The Best Years of Our Lives (1946)

By the late 1930s, Loy was highly regarded for her performances in romantic comedies, and she was anxious to demonstrate her dramatic ability. She was cast in the lead female role in The Rains Came (1939) opposite Tyrone Power. She filmed Third Finger, Left Hand (1940) with Melvyn Douglas and appeared in I Love You Again (1940), Love Crazy (1941), and Shadow of the Thin Man (1941), all with William Powell.

On June 1, 1942, Loy divorced her husband Hornblow in Reno, citing "mental cruelty" as the impetus for separating. Five days after the divorce, she married John D. Hertz, Jr., an advertising executive at his sister's home in New York City. They remained married for two years, eventually divorcing in Cuernavaca, Mexico, on August 21, 1944, with Loy again citing mental cruelty.

With the outbreak of World War II the same year, Loy all but abandoned her acting career to focus on the war effort and began devoting her time to working with the Red Cross. She was so fiercely outspoken against Adolf Hitler that her name appeared on his blacklist, resulting in her films being banned in Germany. She also helped run a Naval Auxiliary canteen and toured frequently to raise funds for the war efforts. Around 1945, Loy began dating producer and screenwriter Gene Markey, who had previously been married to actresses Joan Bennett and Hedy Lamarr. The two were married in a private ceremony on January 3, 1946, at the chapel on Terminal Island, while Markey was serving in the military.

She returned to films with The Thin Man Goes Home (1944). In 1946, she played the wife of a returning serviceman Fredric March in The Best Years of Our Lives (1946). Loy was paired with Cary Grant in David O. Selznick's The Bachelor and the Bobby-Soxer (1947). The film co-starred a teenaged Shirley Temple. Following its success, she appeared again with Grant in Mr. Blandings Builds His Dream House (1948).

In 1947, Loy became one of the founders of the Committee for the First Amendment.

In 1948, she had become a member of the U.S. National Commission for UNESCO, the first Hollywood celebrity to do so.

=== 1950–1982: Later career and political activities ===
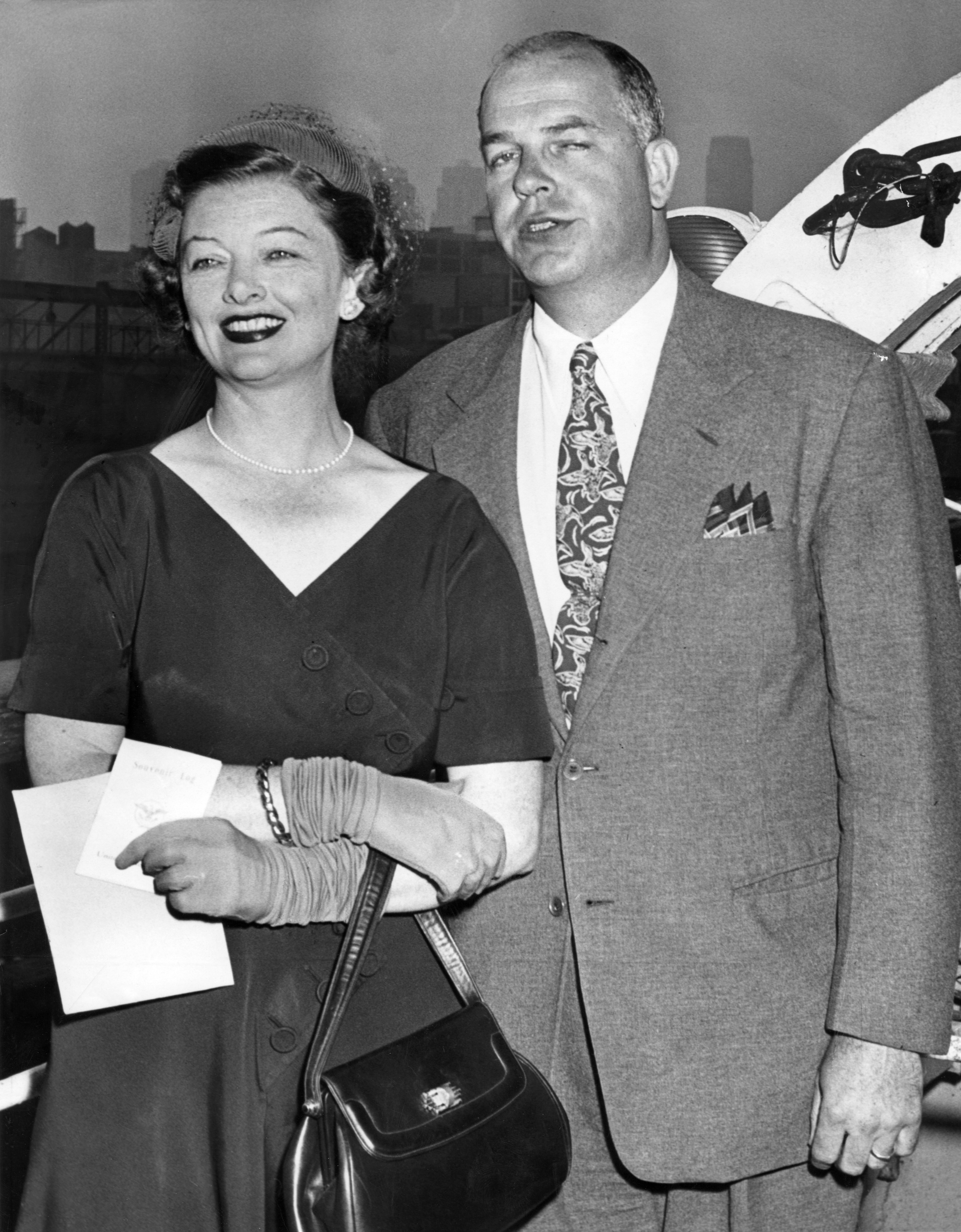
Loy and her fourth husband, Howland H. Sargeant, returning from a UNESCO conference soon after their marriage in 1951

In 1950, Loy co-starred with Clifton Webb in Cheaper by the Dozen (1950), which was a box-office hit, grossing $4.4 million in the United States. The same year, she divorced Markey. Her fourth and final husband was Howland H. Sargeant, U.S. Assistant Secretary of State for Public Affairs and president of Radio Liberty, whom she married on June 2, 1951, in Fort Myer, Virginia. Sargeant, a Presbyterian, wanted the marriage officiated in the church, but they were unable to do so due to Loy's recent divorce.

Throughout the 1950s, Loy assumed an influential role as co-chairman of the Advisory Council of the National Committee Against Discrimination in Housing. In 1952, she starred in the Cheaper by the Dozen sequel, Belles on Their Toes. In 1956, she appeared in The Ambassador's Daughter along with John Forsythe and Olivia de Havilland. She played opposite Montgomery Clift and Robert Ryan in Lonelyhearts (1958), Dore Schary's adaptation of Nathanael West's classic 1933 novel Miss Lonelyhearts. In 1960, she appeared in Midnight Lace and From the Terrace, but was not in another film until 1969 in The April Fools. In 1965, Loy won the Sarah Siddons Award for her work in Chicago theatre.

Loy, a lifelong Democrat, publicly supported the election of John F. Kennedy in 1960, finding Richard Nixon to be an unscrupulous man. She endorsed Eugene McCarthy and later Hubert Humphrey in 1968 and George McGovern in 1972.

She divorced her fourth husband Sargeant in 1960. In 1967, she was cast in the television series The Virginian, appearing in an episode titled "Lady of the House". Also in 1967, she appeared on Family Affair in the episode "A Helping Hand" as a woman who takes a job as a housekeeper and cook. When the arrangement fails despite help from Mr French, she blames him for her misfortune. Mr French's role in the episode was performed by John Williams, who was temporarily substituting for Sebastian Cabot. In 1972, she appeared as the suspect's mother-in-law in an episode of the television series Columbo titled "Étude in Black". In 1974, she had a supporting part in Airport 1975 playing Mrs. Devaney, a heavy-drinking woman imbibing Jim Beam and Olympia Beer mixed together; a foil to the character was played by Sid Caesar. In 1975, Loy was diagnosed with breast cancer and underwent mastectomies to treat the disease. She kept her cancer diagnosis and subsequent treatment from the public until the publication of her autobiography in 1987.

Loy appeared at Denver's Elitch Theatre in 1967 in Barefoot in the Park, and then returned in 1969 in Janus.

In 1978, she appeared in the film The End as the mother of the main character played by Burt Reynolds. Her last motion-picture performance was in 1980 in Sidney Lumet's Just Tell Me What You Want. She also returned to the stage, making her Broadway debut in a short-lived 1973 revival of Clare Boothe Luce's The Women. She toured in a 1978 production of Alan Ayckbourn's Relatively Speaking, directed by David Clayton.

In 1981, she appeared in the television drama Summer Solstice, which was Henry Fonda's last performance. Her last acting role was a guest spot on the sitcom Love, Sidney, in 1982.

=== 1983–1993: Final years ===
In January 1985, Loy was honored by the Academy of Motion Picture Arts and Sciences with a special salute held at Carnegie Hall in New York City, which she attended along with 2,800 guests. Her autobiography, Myrna Loy: Being and Becoming, was published in 1987. The following year, she received a Kennedy Center Honor. Although Loy was never nominated for an Academy Award for any single performance, after an extensive letter-writing campaign and years of lobbying by screenwriter and then–Writers Guild of America, West board member Michael Russnow, who enlisted the support of Loy's former screen colleagues and friends such as Roddy McDowall, Sidney Sheldon, Harold Russell, and many others, she received a 1991 Academy Honorary Award "for her career achievement". She accepted via camera from her New York City home, simply stating, "You've made me very happy. Thank you very much." It was her last public appearance in any medium.

=== Death ===
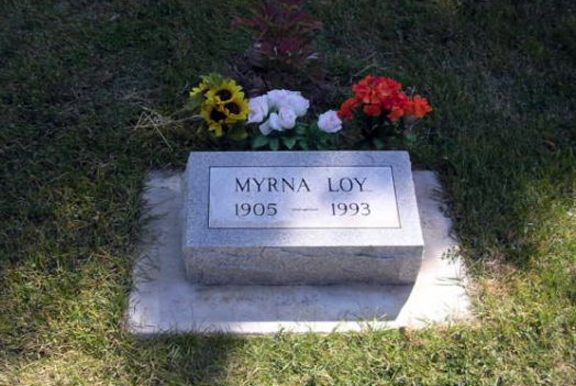
Grave, Helena, Montana

Loy died at age 88 on December 14, 1993, at Lenox Hill Hospital in Manhattan during surgery following a long, unspecified illness. She had been frail and in failing health, which had resulted in her being unable to attend the 1991 Academy Awards ceremony, where she was to receive a lifetime achievement Oscar. She was cremated in New York and her ashes interred at Forestvale Cemetery in her native Helena, Montana.

== Legacy ==
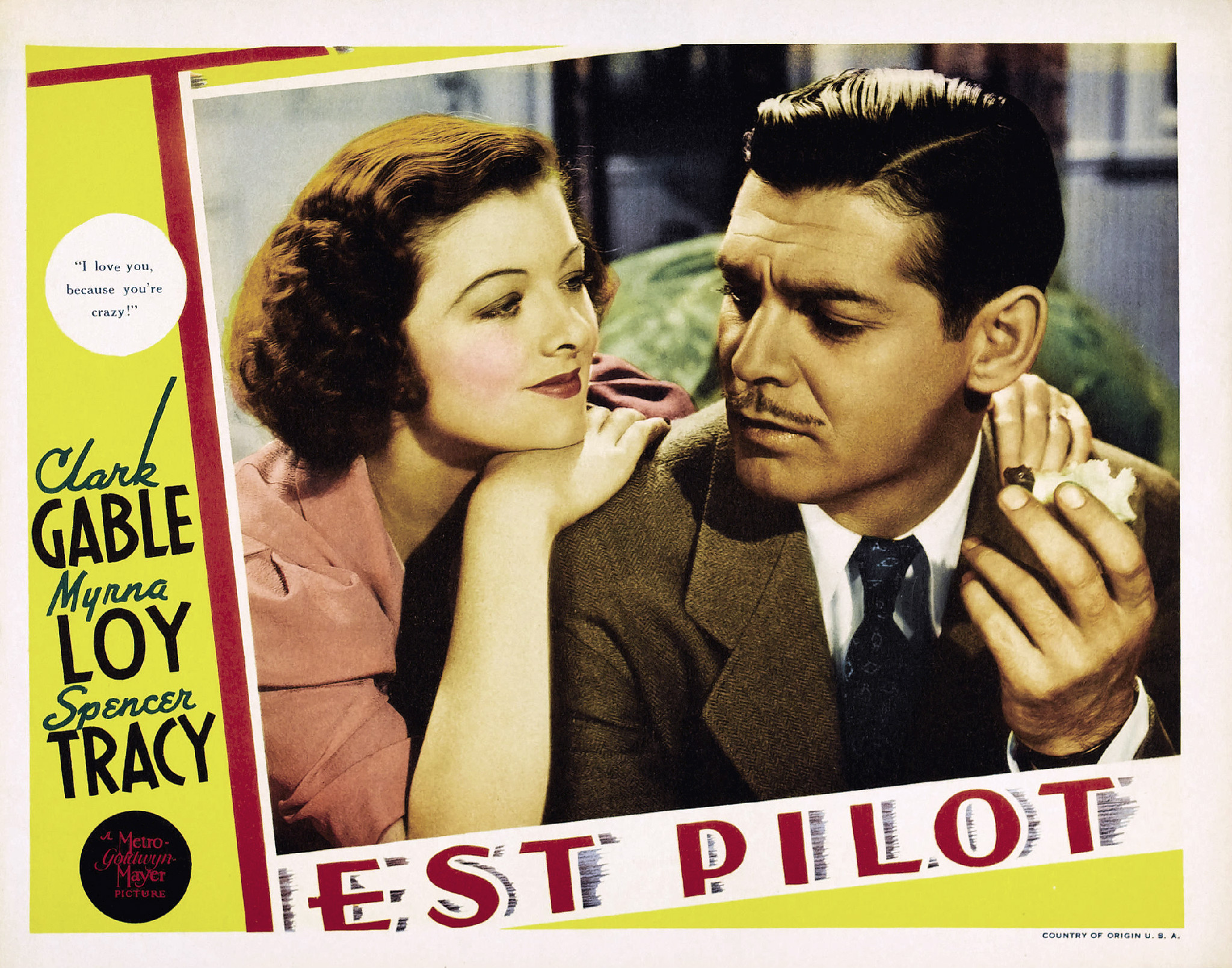
With Clark Gable in Test Pilot

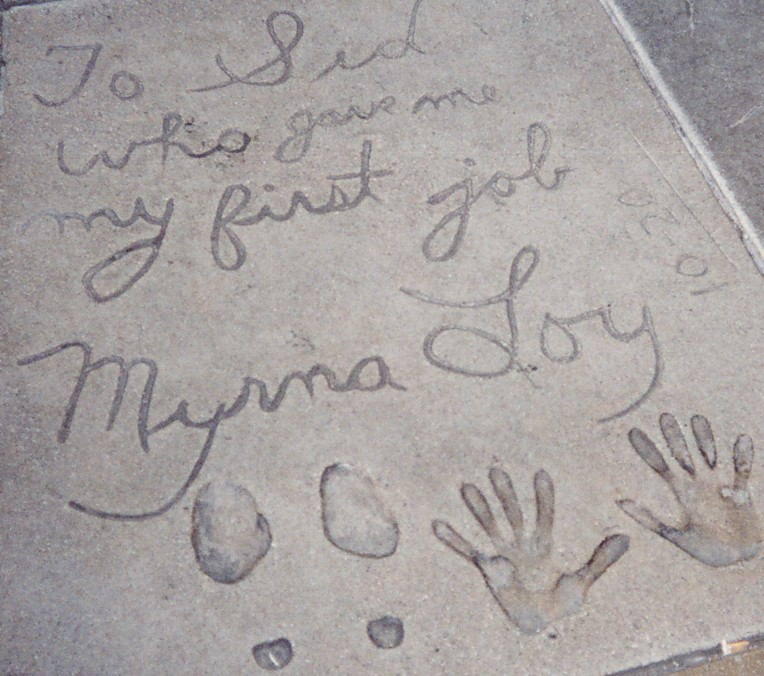
Loy's block in the forecourt of Grauman's Chinese Theatre

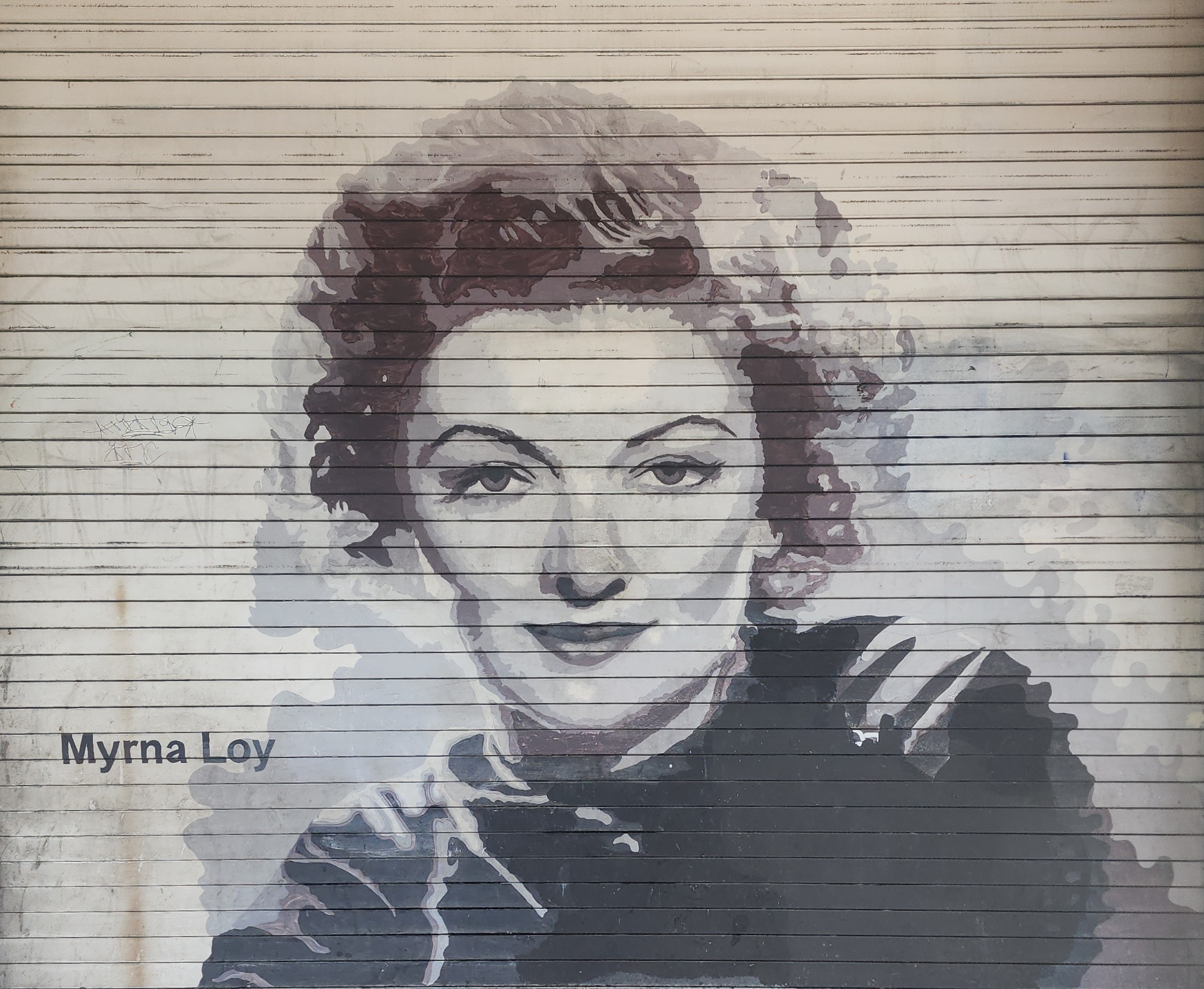
Mural of Myrna Loy located between Hollywood Boulevard and Wilcox Avenue in Los Angeles

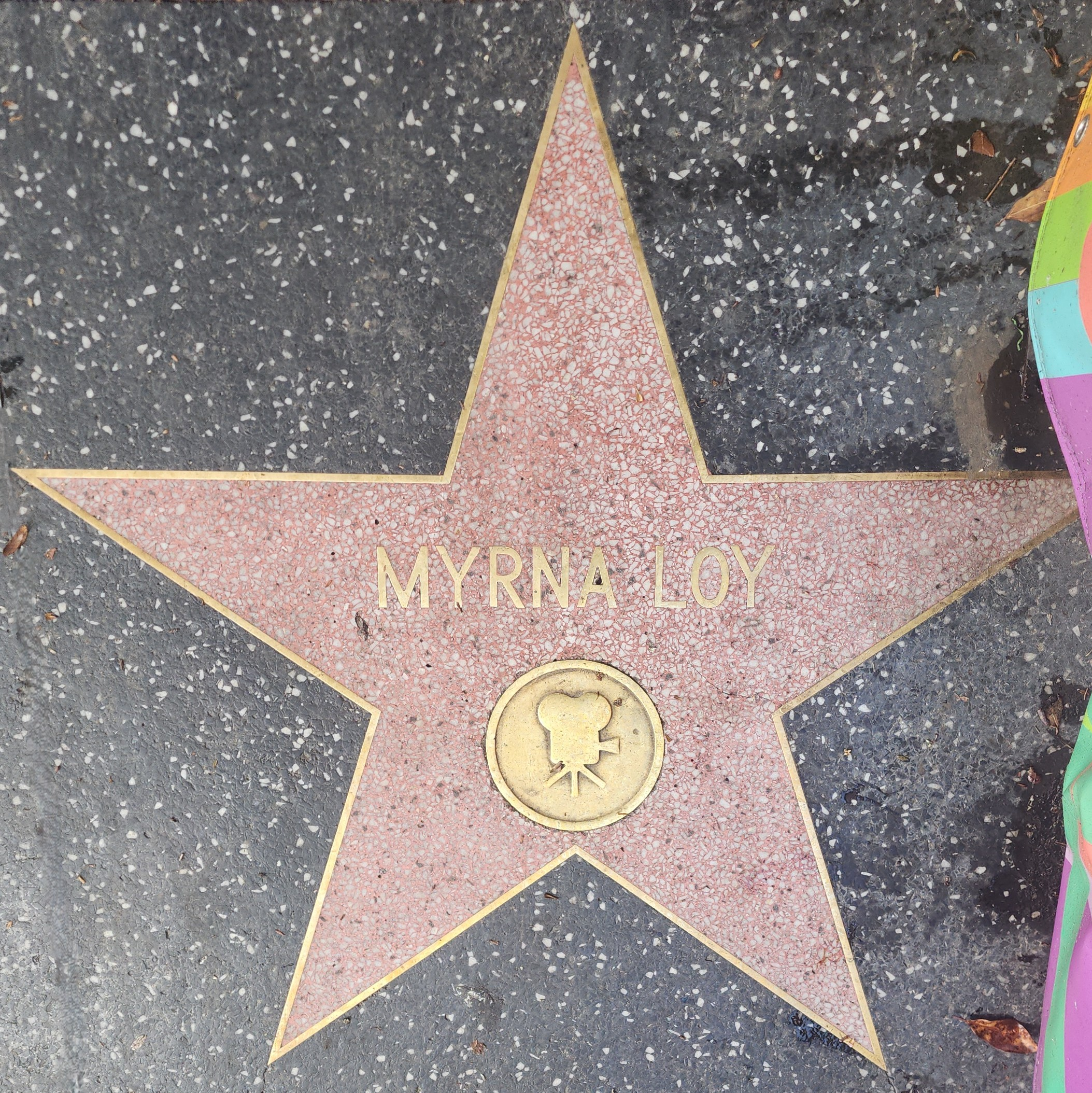
Hollywood Walk of Fame Star of Myrna Loy

A building at Sony Pictures Studios, formerly MGM Studios, in Culver City is named in her honor.

A cast of her handprint and signature is in the sidewalk in front of Theater 80, on St. Mark's Place in New York City.

In 1936, Loy was honored with a block in the forecourt of Grauman's Chinese Theatre.

For her contribution to the film industry, Loy has a star on the Hollywood Walk of Fame at 6685 Hollywood Boulevard. The ceremony was held on February 8, 1960.

Steel Pole Bath Tub has a song on their 1991 album Tulip that is both named after Loy and samples dialogue from one of her films ("Stinky Davis" story, excerpted from The Thin Man Goes Home, 1944).

In 1991, the Myrna Loy Center for the Performing and Media Arts opened in downtown Helena, not far from Loy's childhood home. Located in the historic Lewis and Clark County Jail, it sponsors live performances and alternative films for underserved audiences.

Songwriter Josh Ritter included a song, called "Myrna Loy", on his 2017 album Gathering.

== Radio appearances ==
Year	Program	Episode	Ref.
1936	Lux Radio Theatre	"The Thin Man"	
1937	Maxwell House Good News of 1938	"Herself"	
1940	The Gulf Screen Guild Theater	"Single Crossing"	
1940	Lux Radio Theatre	"After the Thin Man"	
1940	Lux Radio Theatre	"Manhattan Melodrama"	
1941	The Gulf Screen Guild Theater	"Magnificent Obsession"	
1941	Lux Radio Theatre	"I Love You Again"	
1941	Lux Radio Theatre	"Hired Wife"	
1942	Lux Radio Theatre	"Appointment for Love"	
1945	Suspense	"Library Book"	
