= Carl McCardle =

American journalist

6th Assistant Secretary of State for Public Affairs
- In office January 29, 1953 – January 30, 1957
- Preceded by: Howland H. Sargeant
- Succeeded by: Andrew H. Berding

Personal details
- Born: Carl W. McCardle; May 31, 1904 Cameron, West Virginia, U.S.
- Died: July 11, 1972 (aged 68)
- Education: Washington & Jefferson College (BS)
- Profession: Journalist

Carl W. McCardle (May 31, 1904 – July 11, 1972) was born in Cameron, West Virginia and earned a B.S. at Washington and Jefferson College. He was Assistant Secretary of State for Public Affairs from 1953 to 1957.

From 1923 to 1949, McCardle was a reporter and correspondent for multiple news agencies including the Moundsville Echo (West Virginia), the Washington Observer (Pennsylvania), and the Philadelphia Bulletin (Pennsylvania).

From Jan 29, 1953 to Jan 30, 1957, McCardle was Assistant Secretary of State for Public Affairs. Following his government career, he was assistant to the chairman of the board of the Penn-Tex Corporation from 1957 to 1958. In 1959 he served as an executive for Pan American World Airways. In 1960, McCardle returned to his roots as a reporter for the Wheeling Intelligencer in West Virginia.

Government offices
Preceded by Howland H. Sargeant	Assistant Secretary of State for Public Affairs; January 30, 1953 – March 1, 1957	Succeeded by Andrew H. Berding
