= Psychic Phenomena of Jamaica =

1934 book by Joseph J. Williams

Psychic Phenomena of Jamaica is a book by Joseph J. Williams published in 1934. It is a companion to Williams's earlier work, Voodoo and Obeahs.

The book discusses voodoo and other paranormal phenomena which the author claimed to have witnessed or heard about second-hand while he was in Jamaica.
