= Lincoln MacVeagh =

American diplomat, archaeologist, soldier, and publisher (1890-1972)

46th United States Ambassador to Spain
- In office March 27, 1952 – March 4, 1953
- President: Dwight D. Eisenhower
- Preceded by: Stanton Griffis
- Succeeded by: James Clement Dunn

United States Ambassador to Portugal
- In office June 9, 1948 – February 26, 1952
- President: Harry S. Truman; Dwight D. Eisenhower
- Preceded by: John Cooper Wiley
- Succeeded by: Cavendish W. Cannon

United States Ambassador to Greece
- In office 1943–1947
- President: Franklin D. Roosevelt; Harry S. Truman
- Preceded by: Alexander Comstock Kirk
- Succeeded by: Henry F. Grady

United States Ambassador to Yugoslavia
- In office December 9, 1943 – March 11, 1944
- President: Franklin D. Roosevelt
- Preceded by: Anthony Joseph Drexel Biddle Jr.
- Succeeded by: Richard Cunningham Patterson Jr.

United States Ambassador to South Africa
- In office October 21, 1942 – November 21, 1943
- President: Franklin D. Roosevelt
- Preceded by: Leo J. Keena
- Succeeded by: Thomas Holcomb

United States Ambassador to Iceland
- In office September 30, 1941 – June 27, 1942
- President: Franklin D. Roosevelt
- Preceded by: office established
- Succeeded by: Leland B. Morris

United States Minister to Greece
- In office 1933–1941
- President: Franklin D. Roosevelt
- Preceded by: Robert Peet Skinner
- Succeeded by: Anthony Joseph Drexel Biddle Jr.

Personal details
- Born: Lincoln MacVeagh; 1 October 1890 Narragansett Pier, Rhode Island, U.S.
- Died: 15 January 1972 (aged 81) Adelphi, Maryland, U.S.

Lincoln MacVeagh (October 1, 1890 – January 15, 1972) was an American diplomat, archaeologist, soldier, and publisher. He was the founder of Dial Press. He served a long career as the United States ambassador to several countries during difficult times.

== MacVeagh family ==
The MacVeagh family has several noted names in the history of the United States:

- Lincoln's grandfather Wayne MacVeagh was attorney general in the cabinet of President James Garfield.
- Lincoln's father Charles MacVeagh was President Calvin Coolidge's ambassador to Japan.
- Lincoln's great-uncle Franklin MacVeagh was Secretary of the Treasury in the cabinet of President William Howard Taft.

== Early life and education ==
Lincoln MacVeagh was born October 1, 1890, in Narragansett Pier, Rhode Island, the son of Charles MacVeagh and Fanny Davenport Rogers MacVeagh. MacVeagh graduated from Groton School in 1909 and Harvard magna cum laude in 1913. He studied languages at the Sorbonne in 1913–14. He was fluent in German, French, Spanish, Latin, and Classical Greek.

On August 17, 1917, MacVeagh married Margaret Charlton Lewis, the daughter of a distinguished linguist. She was also a serious student of classical languages. Their daughter, Margaret Ewen MacVeagh, accompanied her parents on various tours of duty around the world. Mrs. MacVeagh died on September 9, 1947.

== Career ==
MacVeagh served in the U.S. Army during the Great War, attaining the rank of Major. He was a member of the American Expeditionary Force in Europe. He served in the Artois, St. Mihiel and Meuse-Argonne campaigns and was cited by General of the Armies John J. Pershing in 1919 for "exceptionally meritorious services." After World War I, he became a director of Henry Holt and Company, a publishing firm in New York City. In 1923 he left Henry Holt to found the Dial Press.

== Ambassador of the United States ==
In 1933, President Franklin D. Roosevelt appointed MacVeagh to be the Envoy Extraordinary and Minister Plenipotentiary to Greece. Following his presentation of his credentials, he gave a speech in classical Greek. He remained at the post in Athens until June 5, 1941, several months after the German Army overran Greece.

In 1940, at the beginning of World War II, British troops had invaded and occupied Iceland in fear that Germany would take the island first. In July 1941, the governments of Iceland and the US had agreed that Iceland's defense would be the responsibility of the United States. On August 8, 1941, President Roosevelt appointed MacVeagh as the first U.S. ambassador to Iceland to manage the sensitive relations between the U.S. and Iceland. He remained in Reykjavík until June 27, 1942.

President Roosevelt appointed him to another ambassadorship, this time as the Envoy Extraordinary and Minister Plenipotentiary to the Union of South Africa. He served in Pretoria from May 21, 1942, until November 21, 1943, successfully coordinating the American wartime agencies there.

On November 12, 1943, President Roosevelt again called on MacVeagh's experience in sensitive foreign relations. The President sent him to Cairo to act as the ambassador to the governments-in-exile of Greece and Yugoslavia who had fled their countries. After the liberation of Greece, MacVeagh transferred the embassy back to Athens on October 27, 1944. The office of the Embassy at Cairo was closed, November 8, 1944.

In 1947, he gave secret testimony to the Congress on the danger of Soviet-supported extreme leftist movements in the Balkans. This testimony was considered an important factor in formulating what became known as the Truman Doctrine, which stated that the U.S. would support Greece and Turkey with economic and military aid to prevent their falling into the Soviet Union's sphere of influence. MacVeagh pressed the post-war Greek Government to pursue a democratic policy.

While he was in Greece, MacVeagh conducted excavations beneath the Acropolis and made archeological contributions to the National Archaeological Museum of Athens. With his first wife, Margaret, he wrote Greek Journey, a book for children. His wife died while they were in Athens. He left Athens on October 11, 1947.

President Truman named MacVeagh as ambassador to Portugal on April 8, 1948. While in Lisbon, he was instrumental in bringing Portugal into NATO. He remained at the post in Lisbon until February 26, 1952.

In 1952, President Truman called upon MacVeagh to serve as ambassador to Spain. He served for a year in Madrid.

== Retirement ==
He retired in 1953 as an envoy in Madrid after having conducted successful negotiations for military and economic agreements between the United States and Spain.

In May 1955, MacVeagh remarried Mrs. Virginia Ferrante Coats, daughter of Marchese and Marchesa Ferrante di Ruffano of Naples, Italy. His daughter, Margaret, married Samuel E. Thorne.

MacVeagh died on January 15, 1972, at a nursing home in Adelphi, Maryland, at the age of 81. He was interred at the Church of the Redeemer Cemetery in Lower Merion Township near Philadelphia, Pennsylvania.

== Notes ==
Diplomatic posts
Preceded by Robert Peet Skinner	United States Minister to Greece; 1933–1941	Succeeded by Anthony Joseph Drexel Biddle Jr.
Preceded by none	United States Ambassador to Iceland; 1941–1942	Succeeded by Leland B. Morris
Preceded by Leo J. Keena	United States Ambassador to South Africa; 1942–1943	Succeeded by Thomas Holcomb
Preceded by Anthony Joseph Drexel Biddle Jr.	United States Ambassador to Yugoslavia; 1943–1944	Succeeded by Richard Cunningham Patterson Jr.
Preceded by Alexander Comstock Kirk	United States Ambassador to Greece; 1943–1947	Succeeded by Henry F. Grady
Preceded by John Cooper Wiley	United States Ambassador to Portugal; 1948–1952	Succeeded by Cavendish W. Cannon
Preceded by Stanton Griffis	United States Ambassador to Spain; 1952–1953	Succeeded by James Clement Dunn
