= Wallace S. Murray =

American diplomat (1887–1965)

Wallace Smith Murray

United States Ambassador to Iran
- In office February 20, 1945 – April 18, 1946
- President: Franklin D. Roosevelt; Harry S. Truman
- Preceded by: Leland B. Morris
- Succeeded by: George V. Allen

Personal details
- Died: April 26, 1965 Washington, D.C., U.S.
- Spouse: Frances R. Wilde
- Education: Sorbonne University; University of Paris; Wittenberg University; Harvard University

Military service
- Allegiance: United States
- Branch/service: United States Army
- Years of service: 1917-1920
- 42nd Rainbow Division: France, 1917-1919
- Adjutant to Military Governor: Ahrweiler, Germany, 1919
- Secretary of Legation: Budapest, Hungary, 1920

Wallace Smith Murray (1887–April 26, 1965) was an American diplomat who served as the United States Ambassador to Iran from 1945 to 1946. Prior to his tenure as ambassador he work for the United States Foreign Service in Budapest and Tehran.

== Early life ==
Wallace Smith Murray was born to Maude Murray Miller in 1887. His mother was the first woman to represent Ohio in the Democratic National Committee. He was educated at Sorbonne University, and the University of Paris. In Ohio he taught French and German. He graduated from Wittenberg University in 1909, and graduated with a master's degree from Harvard University in 1913. He was master of the University School from 1913 to 1917.

== Career ==
During World War I Murray served in the 42nd Infantry Division as a first lieutenant. He fought at the Second Battle of the Marne and participated in the Meuse–Argonne offensive. Murray joined the United States Foreign Service in 1920, and served in Budapest and Tehran. He was present for the signing of the U.S.–Hungarian Peace Treaty as a secretary. He joined the Near Eastern Affairs Division in 1925, and rose to become chief in November 1942.

President Franklin D. Roosevelt appointed Murray as director of the Office of Near Eastern and African Affairs in January 1944. Roosevelt appointed Murray as ambassador to Iran on February 20, 1945. He presented his credentials on June 5, 1945, and served until April 18, 1946.

== Personal life ==
Murray married Frances Rabbitts Wilde, a British woman, on November 5, 1924. He died in Washington, D.C., on April 26, 1965.

== Bibliography ==
- Murray, Wallace Smith (1924). "French A; Grammatical Questions and Sight Translation". Cleveland, Ohio: University Supply and Book Co.

== Works cited ==
=== Books ===
- Imre, Mark (1974). American Hungarian Relations 1918-1944. Patria Publishing. ISBN 0879340363.
- Stein, Susan (2020). On Distant Service: The Life of the First U.S. Foreign Service Officer to Be Assassinated. University of Nebraska Press. ISBN 9781640123540.

=== News ===
- "Appointment of Envoy to Iran Revives Memories For Residents in Springfield". Springfield News-Sun. June 10, 1945. p. 10 – via Newspapers.com.
- "Deaths" (PDF). Foreign Service Journal. 1965. Archived (PDF) from the original on June 23, 2025.

=== Web ===
- "Wallace Smith Murray (1887–1965)". Office of the Historian. May 13, 2020. Archived from the original on June 23, 2025.
