= James Williams Riddleberger =

American diplomat and foreign service officer (1904–1982)

James Riddleberger
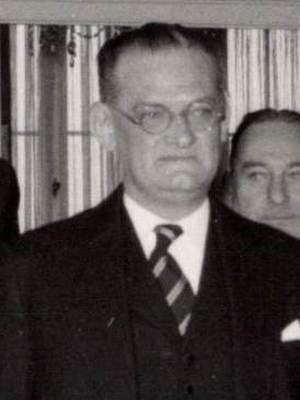

United States Ambassador to Austria
- In office December 12, 1962 – May 10, 1967
- President: John F. Kennedy; Lyndon B. Johnson
- Preceded by: H. Freeman Matthews
- Succeeded by: Douglas MacArthur II

Director of the International Cooperation Administration
- In office March 9, 1959 – February 22, 1961
- President: Dwight Eisenhower; John F. Kennedy
- Preceded by: James Smith
- Succeeded by: Henry Labouisse

United States Ambassador to Greece
- In office March 4, 1958 – May 20, 1959
- President: Dwight Eisenhower
- Preceded by: George V. Allen
- Succeeded by: Ellis O. Briggs

United States Ambassador to Yugoslavia
- In office November 16, 1953 – January 11, 1958
- President: Dwight Eisenhower
- Preceded by: George V. Allen
- Succeeded by: Karl L. Rankin

Assistant Secretary of State for German Affairs
- In office May 14, 1952 – July 31, 1952
- President: Harry Truman
- Preceded by: Henry A. Byroade
- Succeeded by: Livingston T. Merchant (European Affairs)

Personal details
- Born: James Williams Riddleberger; September 21, 1904 Washington, D.C., U.S.
- Died: October 17, 1982 (aged 78) Woodstock, Virginia, U.S.
- Education: Randolph-Macon College (BA); Georgetown University (MA); American University (attended)

James Williams Riddleberger (September 21, 1904 – October 17, 1982) was an American diplomat and career foreign service officer. During his career, he served three ambassadorships: in Austria, Yugoslavia and Greece.

== Biography ==
=== Early life and education ===
Riddleberger was born in Washington, D.C., on September 21, 1904. He earned a B.A, from Randolph-Macon College in 1924 and MA in Foreign Service from Georgetown University in 1926. He also attended American University from 1926–27 and was an assistant professor for international relations at Georgetown University from 1926 to 1929. Before joining the Foreign Service in 1929, he worked for the Library of Congress and Tariff Commission.

=== Career ===
Riddleberger began his foreign service career in Geneva, where he served as Vice Consul and later as Consul at the League of Nations and Berlin as Third Secretary(1936–37) and Second Secretary(1937–1941). He served as chief of the Central European Affairs division during the Second World War. After the war, he became the chief political adviser to General Lucius D. Clay and later to John J. McCloy in occupied Germany. He was then transferred to Paris in 1950 to serve as a senior political advisor aiding in the administration of the Marshall Plan. He served as director of the Bureau of German Affairs before beginning a four-year term as ambassador to Yugoslavia. After Yugoslavia broke away from the Soviet orbit of influence in 1948, Riddleberger was credited with persuading Josip Broz Tito to rebuff coaxing by Nikita Khrushchev to return. As Ambassador to Greece, he worked to smooth relations between Greece and Turkey in their dispute over Cyprus.

Following his retirement from government service, Mr. Riddleberger returned to his family home in Woodstock. He took on leadership roles, serving as president of Diplomatic and Consular Officers Retired and as honorary chairman of the Population Crisis Committee.

== Death ==
Riddleberger died from heart attack at Shenandoah County Memorial Hospital, at the age of 78. His daughter, Antonia Riddleberger, was married to diplomat Monteagle Stearns (1924–2016), who served as United States Ambassador to Greece from August 1981 through September 1985.

== Obituaries ==
- Chicago Tribune, October 19, 1982.
- Washington Post, October 19, 1982.

Political offices
Preceded by Henry A. Byroade	Assistant Secretary of State for German Affairs; 1952	Succeeded by Livingston T. Merchant as Assistant Secretary of State for European Affairs
Diplomatic posts
Preceded by George V. Allen	United States Ambassador to Yugoslavia; 1953–1958	Succeeded by Karl L. Rankin
Preceded by George V. Allen	United States Ambassador to Greece; 1958–1959	Succeeded by Ellis O. Briggs
Preceded by James Smith	Director of the International Cooperation Administration; 1959–1961	Succeeded by Henry Labouisse
Preceded by H. Freeman Matthews	United States Ambassador to Austria; 1962–1967	Succeeded by Douglas MacArthur II
