= Wikimania =

Wikimedia movement annual conference

- Status: Active
- Genre: Conference
- Frequency: Annually
- Inaugurated: August 5, 2005; 21 years ago
- Most recent: July 21–25, 2026
- Organizer: Local volunteer teams
- Filing status: Non-profit
- Website: wikimania.wikimedia.org

Wikimania is the Wikimedia movement's annual conference, organized by the community of contributors and hosted by the Wikimedia Foundation. Topics of presentations and discussions include Wikimedia projects such as Wikipedia, other wikis, open-source software, free knowledge and free content, and social and technical aspects related to these topics.

Since 2011, the winner of the Wikimedian of the Year award (known as the "Wikipedian of the Year" until 2017) has been announced at Wikimania.

== Conferences ==
Wikimania conferences
| Logo | Conference | Date | Place | Attendance | Archive of presentations |
|---|---|---|---|---|---|
| Logo of the Wikimania 2005 conference, held in Frankfurt, Germany | Wikimania 2005 | August 4–8 | Frankfurt, Germany | 380 | slides, video |
| Logo of the Wikimania 2006 conference, held in Cambridge, Massachusetts | Wikimania 2006 | August 4–6 | Cambridge, Massachusetts, United States | 400 | slides and papers, video |
| Logo of the Wikimania 2007 conference, held in Taipei, Taiwan | Wikimania 2007 | August 3–5 | Taipei, Taiwan | 440 | Commons gallery |
| Logo of the Wikimania 2008 conference, held in Alexandria, Egypt | Wikimania 2008 | July 17–19 | Alexandria, Egypt | 650 | abstracts, slides, video |
| Logo of the Wikimania 2009 conference, held in Buenos Aires, Argentina | Wikimania 2009 | August 26–28 | Buenos Aires, Argentina | 559 | slides, video |
| Logo of the Wikimania 2010 conference, held in Gdańsk, Poland | Wikimania 2010 | July 9–11 | Gdańsk, Poland | about 500 | slides |
| Logo of the Wikimania 2011 conference, held in Haifa, Israel | Wikimania 2011 | August 4–7 | Haifa, Israel | 720 | presentations, video |
| Logo of the Wikimania 2012 conference, held in Washington DC, US | Wikimania 2012 | July 12–15 | Washington, D.C., United States | 1,400 | presentations, videos |
| Logo of Wikimania 2013 | Wikimania 2013 | August 7–11 | Hong Kong, China | 700 | presentations, videos |
| The logo of Wikimania 2014 | Wikimania 2014 | August 6–10 | London, United Kingdom | 1,762 | presentations, videos |
| Logo of Wikimania 2015 | Wikimania 2015 | July 15–19 | Mexico City, Mexico | 800 | presentations, videos |
| Logo of Wikimania 2016 | Wikimania 2016 | June 21–28 | Esino Lario, Italy | 1,365 | presentations, videos |
| The logo of Wikimania 2017 | Wikimania 2017 | August 9–13 | Montreal, Quebec, Canada | 915 | presentations, videos |
| Logo Wikimania Cape Town | Wikimania 2018 | July 18–22 | Cape Town, South Africa | over 700 | presentations, videos |
| Logo Wikimania Stockholm | Wikimania 2019 | August 14–18 | Stockholm, Sweden | over 800 | presentations, videos |
| | Wikimania 2020 (cancelled) | August 5–9 | Bangkok, Thailand | Cancelled due to the COVID-19 pandemic | – |
| Logo Wikimania 2021 | Wikimania 2021 | August 13–17 | Virtual environment | Unknown | presentations, videos |
| Logo Wikimania 2022 | Wikimania 2022 | August 11–14 | Virtual environment | Unknown | presentations, videos |
| Logo Wikimania Singapore | Wikimania 2023 | August 15–20 | Singapore and Virtual environment | 761 in-person and over 2,105 virtually | presentations, videos |
| Logo Wikimania 2024 | Wikimania 2024 | August 6–10 | Katowice, Poland | 1,150 estimated in-person, over 2,200 total | presentations, videos |
| Logo Wikimania 2025 | Wikimania 2025 | August 5–9 | Nairobi, Kenya | 776 in-person and over 1,900 virtually | presentations, videos |
| Logo Wikimania 2026 | Wikimania 2026 | July 21–25 | Paris, France | 1250 in-person, and over 2,000 virtually | presentations, videos |
| Logo Wikimania 2027, reading "Wikimania Santiago" with colorful birds and art designs around the first word | Wikimania 2027 | August 18–21 | Santiago, Chile | | |

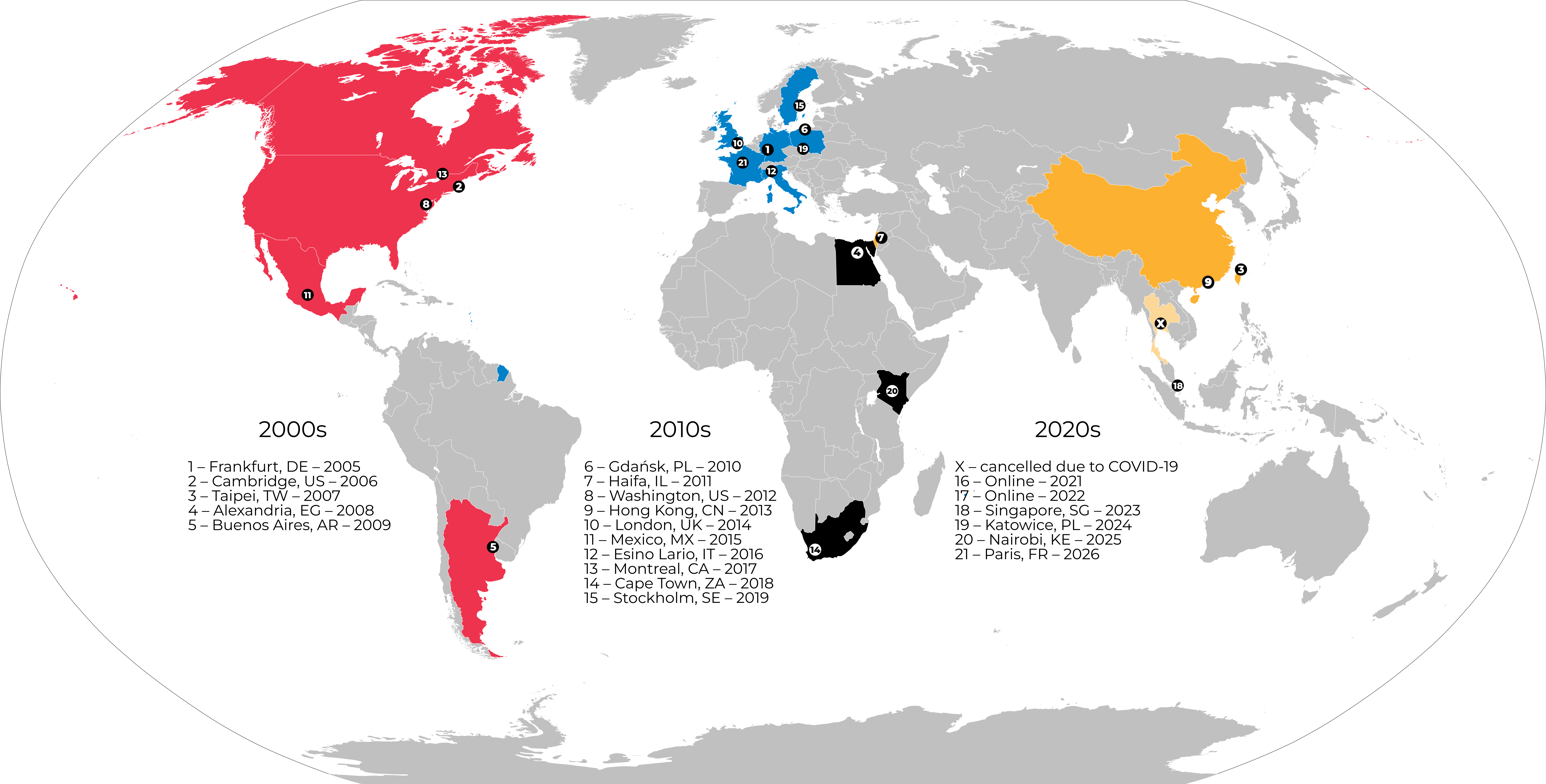
World map showing Wikimania host cities and their countries

=== 2005 ===
Wikimania – the Wikimentary, documentary about Wikimania 2005, featuring Jimmy Wales and Ward Cunningham

Wikimania 2005, the first Wikimania conference, was held from August 4 to 8, 2005 at the Haus der Jugend in Frankfurt, Germany, attracting about 380 attendees.

The week of the conference included four "Hacking Days", from August 1 to 4, when some 25 developers gathered to work on code and discuss the technical aspects of MediaWiki and of running the Wikimedia projects. The main days of the conference, despite its billing as being "August 4–8", were Friday to Sunday of that week, from August 5 to 7. Presentation sessions were scheduled all day during those three days.

Keynote speakers included Jimmy Wales, Ross Mayfield, Ward Cunningham, and Richard Stallman (who spoke on "Copyright and community in the age of computer networks"). The majority of sessions and conversations were in English, although a few were in German.

Sponsors of the event included Answers.com, SocialText, Sun Microsystems, DocCheck, and Logos Group.

=== 2006 ===
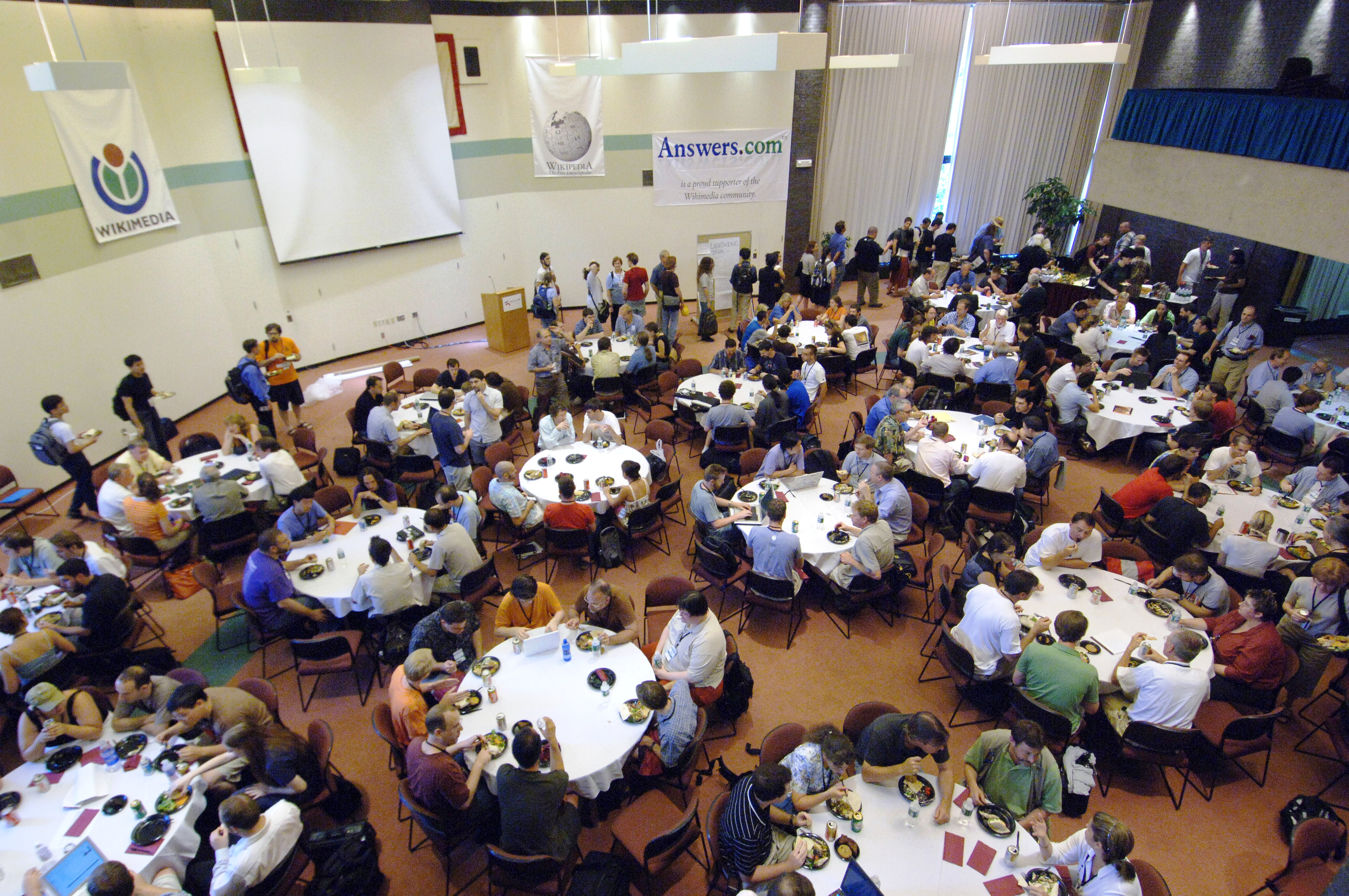
Attendees break for lunch, 2006

Wikimania 2006, the second Wikimania conference, was held from August 6 to 8, 2006 at Harvard Law School's Berkman Center for Internet & Society in Cambridge in Massachusetts, United States, with about 400–500 attendees.

Speakers included Wales, Lawrence Lessig, Brewster Kahle, Yochai Benkler, Mitch Kapor, Ward Cunningham, and David Weinberger. Dan Gillmor held a citizen journalism unconference the day after.

Wales' plenary speech was covered by the Associated Press, and printed in numerous worldwide newspapers. He chronicled how the Foundation evolved from him "sitting in his pajamas" to the maturing corporate structure that it is now; the frequent push for quality over quantity; Wikipedia will be included on computers distributed through One Laptop per Child; both Wikiversity and the creation of an advisory board were approved by the Foundation board; and that Wiki-WYG is in development thanks to private investment by Wikia, Inc. and Socialtext.

Answers.com was the Wikimania 2006 patron sponsor, while Amazon.com, the Berkman Center for Internet & Society at Harvard Law School, Nokia, WikiHow were Benefactors-level sponsors, Wetpaint, Ask.com, Yahoo!, and Socialtext were Friends-level sponsors, and IBM, FAQ Farm, Elevation Partners, One Laptop per Child, and the Sunlight Foundation were Supporter-level sponsors of the conference.

Three other teams submitted hosting bids, for the cities of London, Milan, Boston, and Toronto; only Toronto and Boston were passed to the second round of consideration by Wikimania organizers. In Toronto's case, the event would have been hosted in the University of Toronto's Bahen Centre.

=== 2007 ===
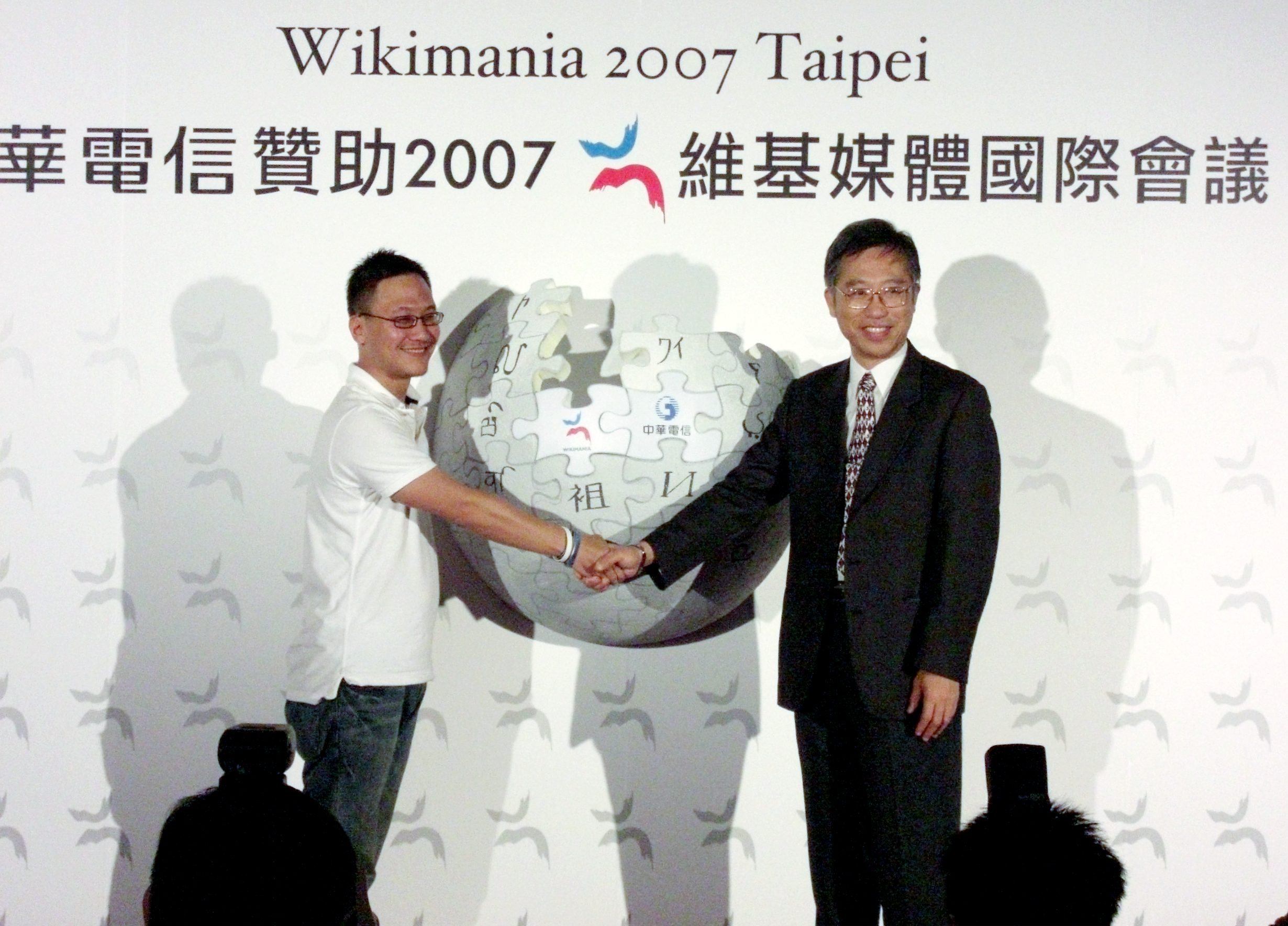
Chunghwa Telecom press conference, sponsor of Wikimania 2007

As announced on September 25, 2006, Wikimania 2007, the third Wikimania conference, was held from August 3 to 5, 2007 in Taipei, Taiwan. It was the first Wikimania event to hold a volunteer training course.

Three other teams submitted hosting bids, for the cities of London, Alexandria, and Turin. Bids for Hong Kong, Singapore, Istanbul, and Orlando failed to make the shortlist. The winner was announced on September 25, 2006.

On August 3, 2007, New York Times reporter Noam Cohen wrote: "The conference has attracted about 440 attendees, a little more than half from Taiwan, who want to immerse themselves for three days in the ideas and issues that come up making an entirely volunteer-written encyclopedia. The workshops cover practical topics like how to collaborate peacefully; what importance to give 'expertise' in a project that is celebrated for allowing anyone to contribute, including anonymous editors".

=== 2008 ===
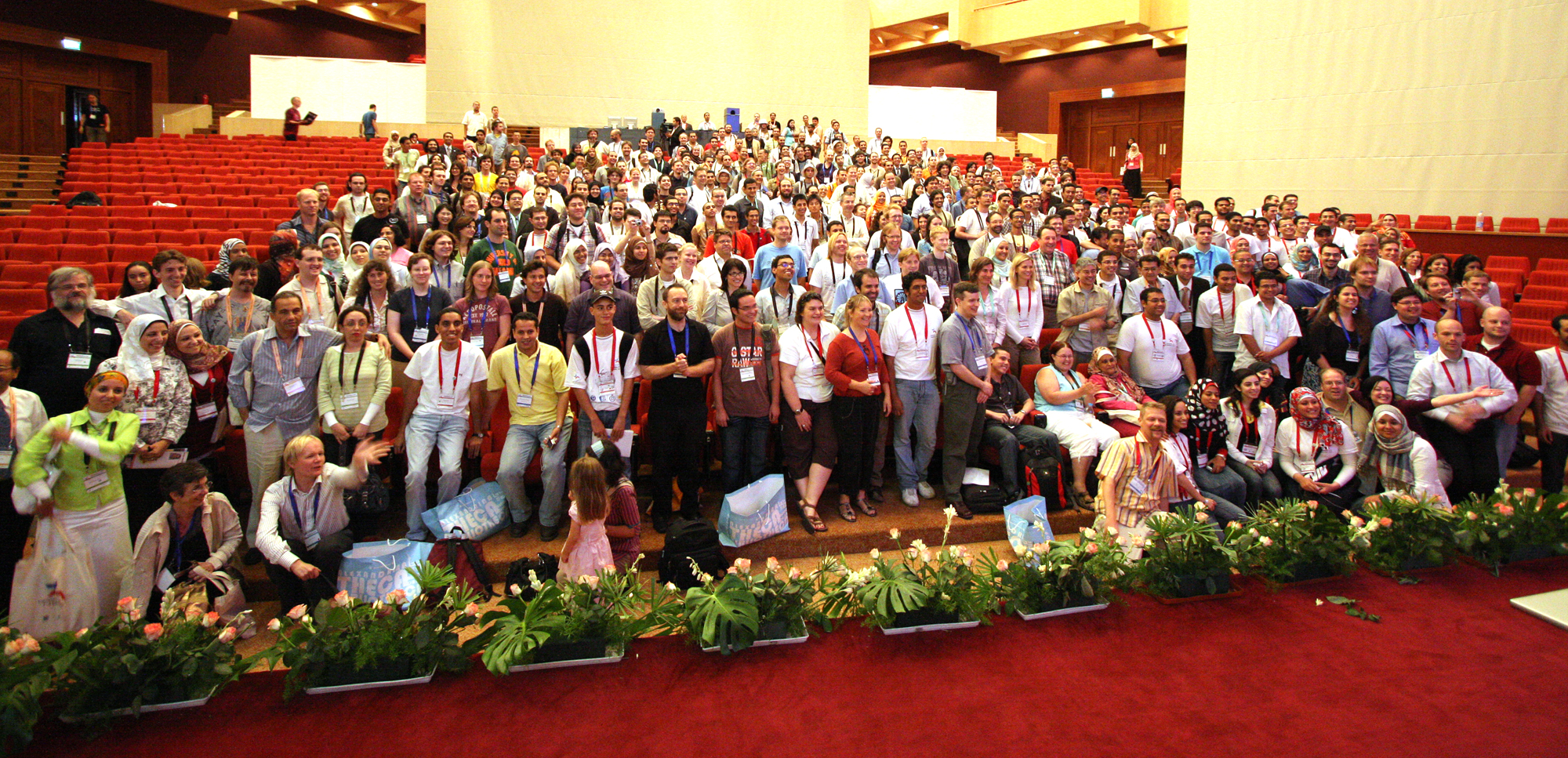
2008 group photo

Wikimania 2008, the fourth Wikimania conference, was held from July 17 to 19, 2008 at the Bibliotheca Alexandrina in Alexandria, Egypt, with 650 attendees from 45 countries. Alexandria was the location of the ancient Library of Alexandria. Three proposed cities were in the running at the end, the other two being Atlanta and Cape Town. Proposals for Karlsruhe, London and Toronto were also submitted, but later withdrew. There was a controversy about the conference, and even a call to boycott Wikimania 2008 because of Egypt's alleged censorship and imprisoning of bloggers during Mubarak's era. Mohamed Ibrahim, a graduate of Alexandria University who worked to bring the conference to Alexandria, told the BBC "I think we have the right to develop and to make freedom of expression on a larger scale." One of his goals was to help grow Arabic Wikipedia which he contributes to since early 2005. An Egyptian cabinet minister spoke at the opening ceremonies on Mubarak's behalf.

=== 2009 ===
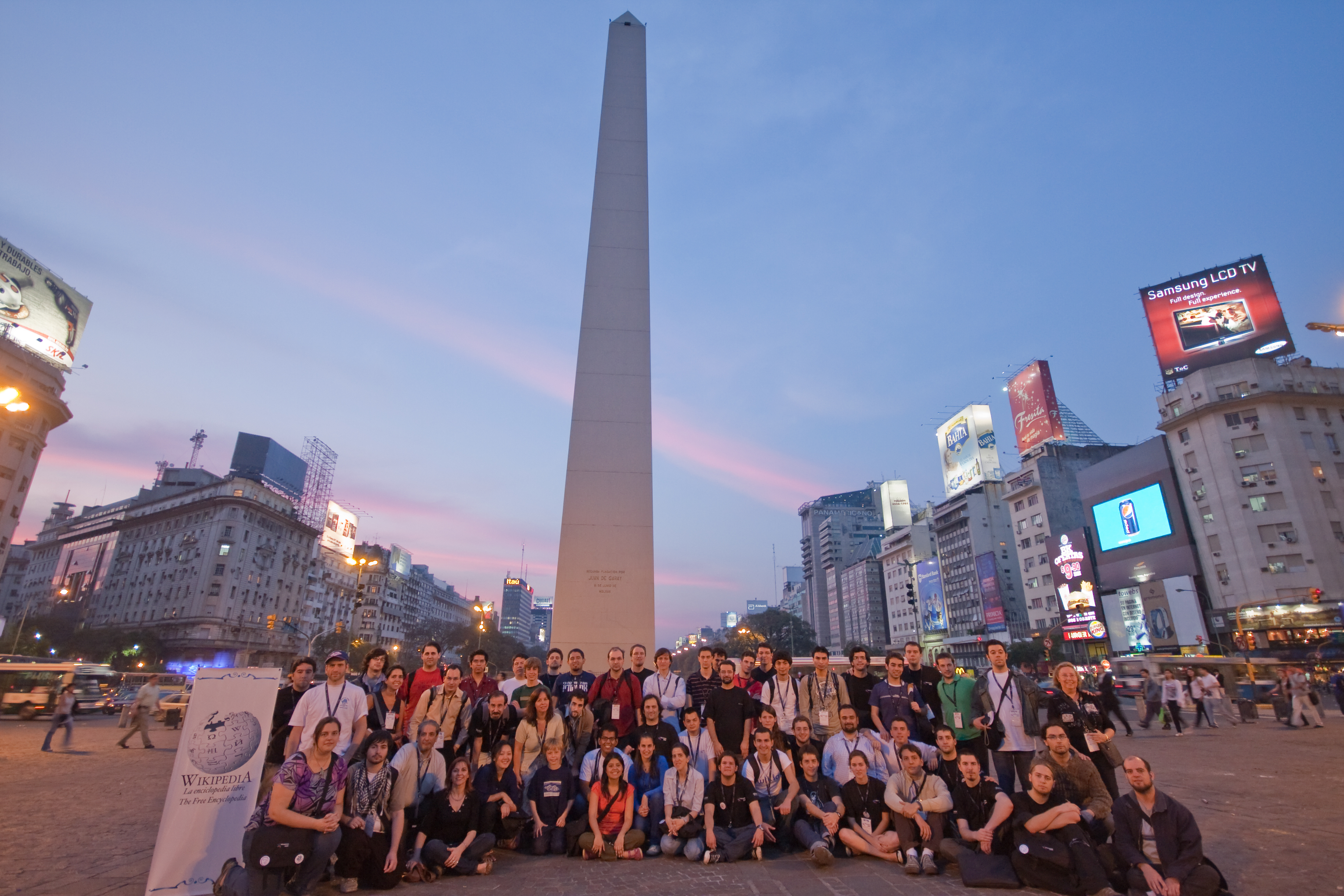
2009 group photo

The fifth Wikimania conference was held at the Centro Cultural General San Martín from August 26 to 28, 2009 in Buenos Aires, Argentina, with 559 attendees. The city was selected over other bids from Brisbane, Karlsruhe, and Toronto.

With keynotes from Richard Stallman and Jimmy Wales, the conference included a Wikimania Codeathon (hackathon) and an informal Chapters' meeting. It was organized in two scopes: Casual and Academic tracks, each comprising the same four themes: Wikimedia Communities, Free Knowledge, Latin American challenges, and Technical infrastructure.

=== 2010 ===
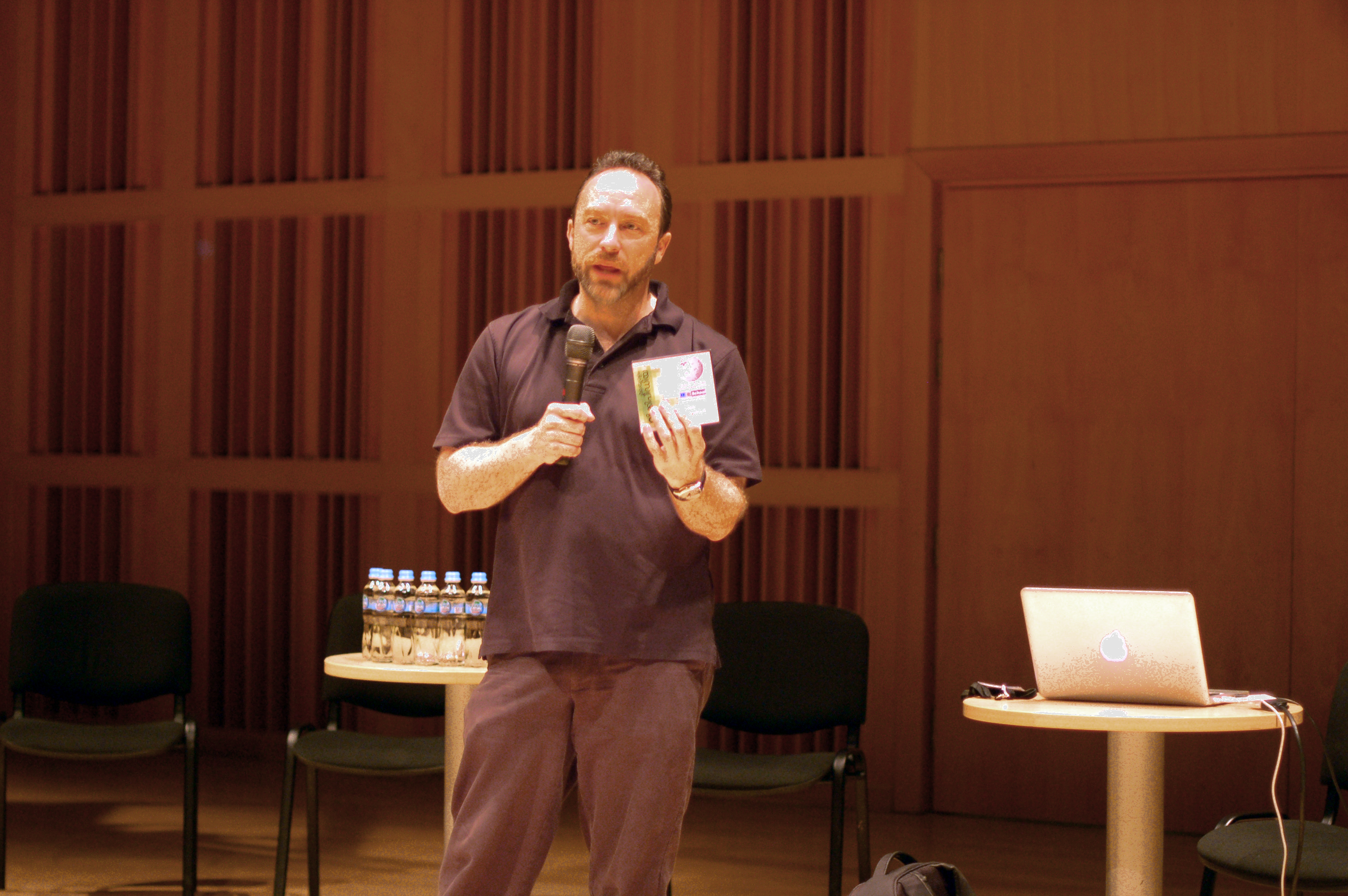
Jimmy Wales gives the keynote address, 2010.

The sixth Wikimania conference was held from July 9 to 11 at the Polish Baltic Philharmonic in Gdańsk, Poland. The starting day on July 9 overlapped with the end of the WikiSym academic conference. Bids for Amsterdam and Oxford lost by a small margin. Wikimania 2010 was the first conference which included a big focus on the cultural aspects of the hosting nation, particularly a concert of a philharmonic orchestra, celebrating the tenth anniversary of the death of the most important contemporary Polish composer Władysław Szpilman and the premiere of the film Truth in Numbers?. At the conference, WMF executive director Sue Gardner said the foundation aimed to grow the number of visitors to Wikimedia sites from 371 million to 680 million a month, over the next five years.

=== 2011 ===
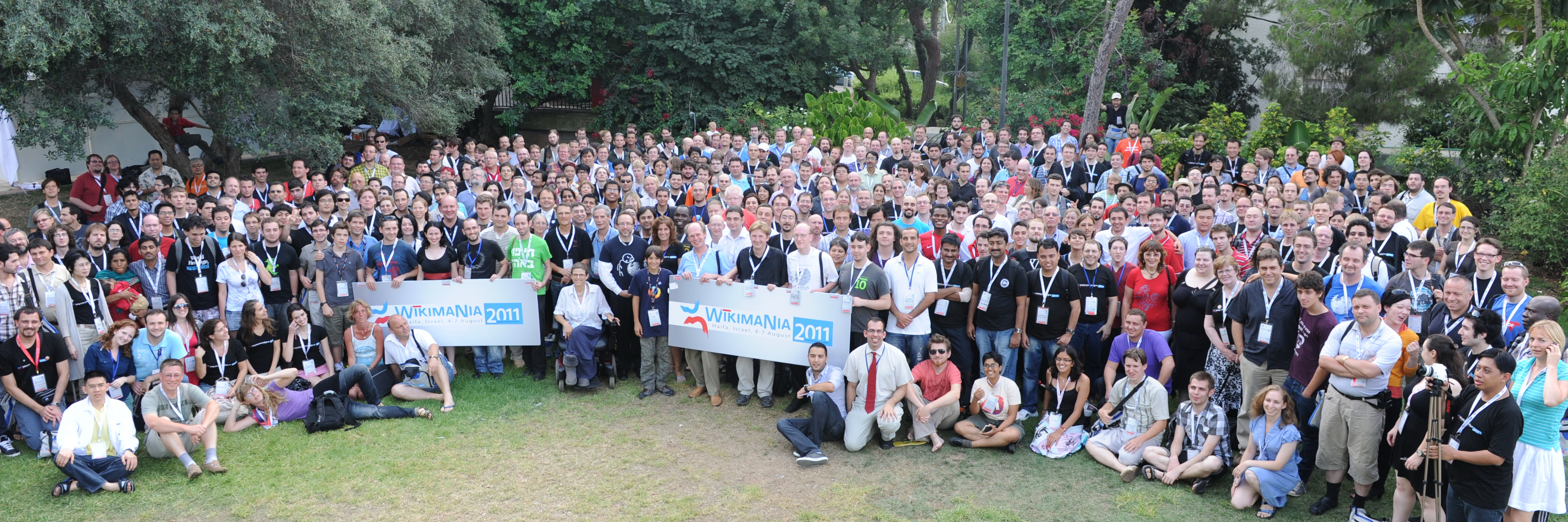
2011 group photo

Wikimania 2011, the seventh Wikimania conference, was held from August 4 to 7, 2011 in Haifa, Israel. The conference venue was the Haifa Auditorium and adjoining Beit Hecht cultural center on Mount Carmel. Keynote speakers at the conference included Yochai Benkler, a fellow at the Berkman Center for Internet and Society at Harvard University and Joseph M. Reagle Jr. of MIT, author of Good Faith Collaboration: The Culture of Wikipedia. Head of the Science and Technology Committee at the Knesset, Meir Sheetrit, also spoke at the conference, as did Yonah Yahav, the Mayor of Haifa. One of the sponsors of the event was Haifa University. The conference featured 125 sessions in five simultaneous tracks and was attended by 720 Wikimedians from 56 different countries, including some that have no diplomatic relations with Israel.

In an interview with Haaretz, Wales noted that there had been boycott calls against the conference in Israel, as there had been against having it in Egypt in 2008. He said that despite conflicts among editors on the Israel-Palestinian conflict, and efforts by a pro-Israel group to recruit more Wikipedia editors, he believes Wikipedia articles largely remained neutral on the topic; he stated "NPOV is non-negotiable."

Wikimedia Foundation executive director Sue Gardner spoke to the conference about the Western, male-dominated mind-set characterizing Wikipedia. At the end of the August 7 closing ceremony, Wales was presented with the first day cover of the first-ever Wikimedia-related postal stamp, issued by the Israeli postal service in honor of the event. Among new projects discussed was collaboration with cultural institutions such as galleries, libraries, archives and museums.

After the conference, participants were offered a free tour of Haifa, Jerusalem, Nazareth or Acre. Shay Yakir, outgoing chairman of Wikimedia Israel, said that for Israel, holding the conference in Haifa was like hosting the Olympic Games.

=== 2012 ===
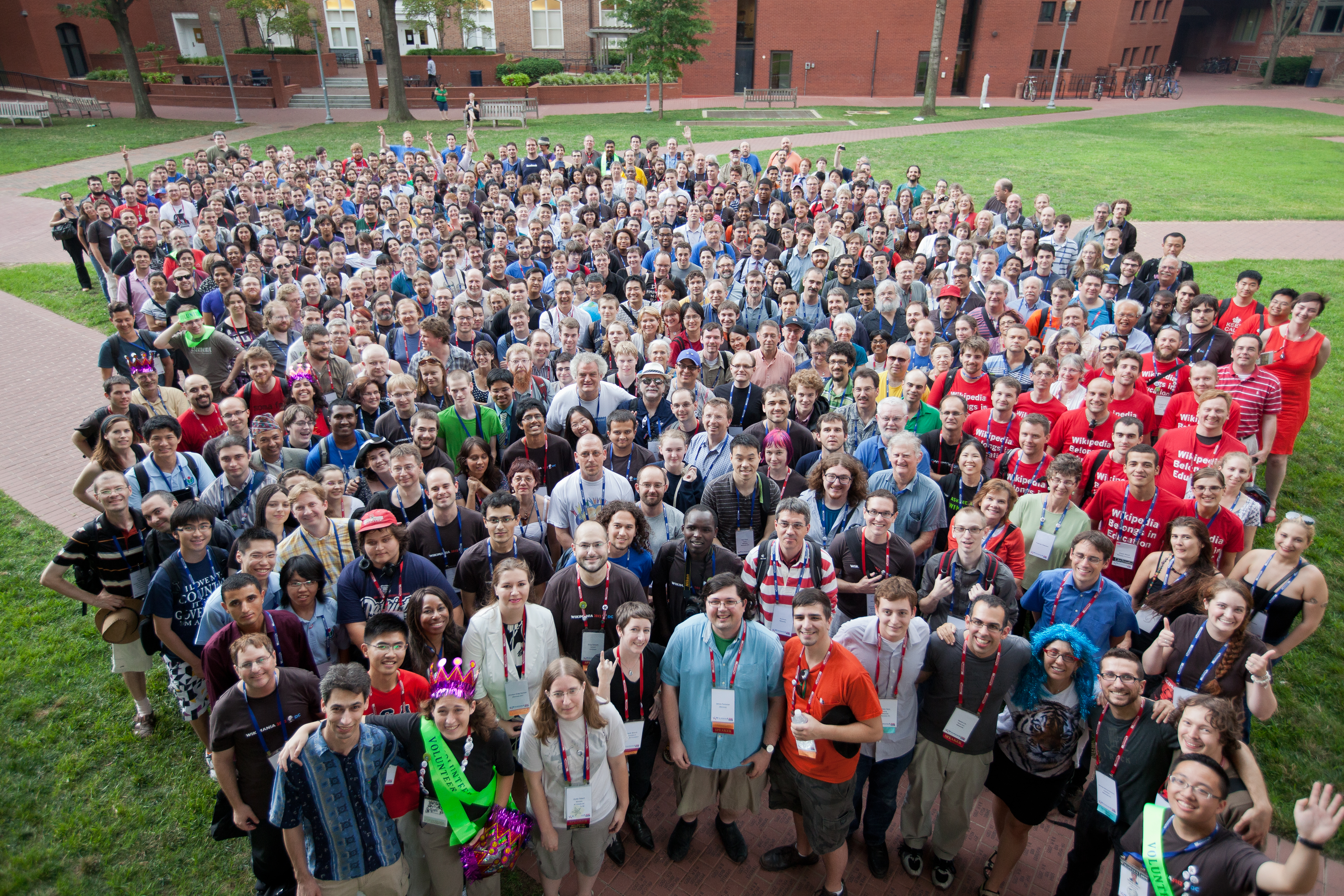
2012 group photo

Wikimania 2012, the eighth Wikimania conference, was held from July 12 to 15, 2012 at George Washington University in Washington, D.C., with over 1,400 attendees from 87 countries. In conjunction with the conference, the U.S. Department of State hosted Tech@State:Wiki.Gov, which focused on "collaborative knowledge and the use of wikis in the public sector". Prominent conference themes were the need to update the old and "dowdy" interface with new Wikimedia tools in order to attract and retain more editors and to make Wikimedia sites more inviting and friendly to users, including especially women. The Atlantic featured charts displayed at the conference which showed how the number of new administrators has dropped precipitously over the last few years.

During the opening plenary, Wales commented on Wikipedia blackout of January 2012, stating "When I go and visit government officials now, they're a little bit afraid." However he reiterated Wikimedia's commitment to political neutrality except regarding "the most serious things that directly impact our work." Wales agreed with keynote speaker Mary Gardiner, co-founder of the Ada Initiative, that Wikimedia had to do more to increase the number of women editors. She said, "As a project of social change, even if it's not an activist project, the Wikipedia community has a responsibility both to its mission and to the people out there in the world to always be on a journey toward diversity — to increase the size of the umbrella of the world."

=== 2013 ===
2013 documentary

Wikimania 2013, the ninth Wikimania conference, was held from August 7 to 11, 2013 at The Hong Kong Polytechnic University, with 700 attendees from 88 countries. Candidate cities were London (UK), Bristol (UK), Naples (Italy) and Surakarta (Indonesia). One of the parties for the event was held at the International Commerce Centre and the closing party was held at Shek O Beach. Topics discussed included Wikipedia's gender disparity and Wales' proposal for Wikipedia to begin using Secure Sockets Layer to encrypt its pages.

=== 2014 ===
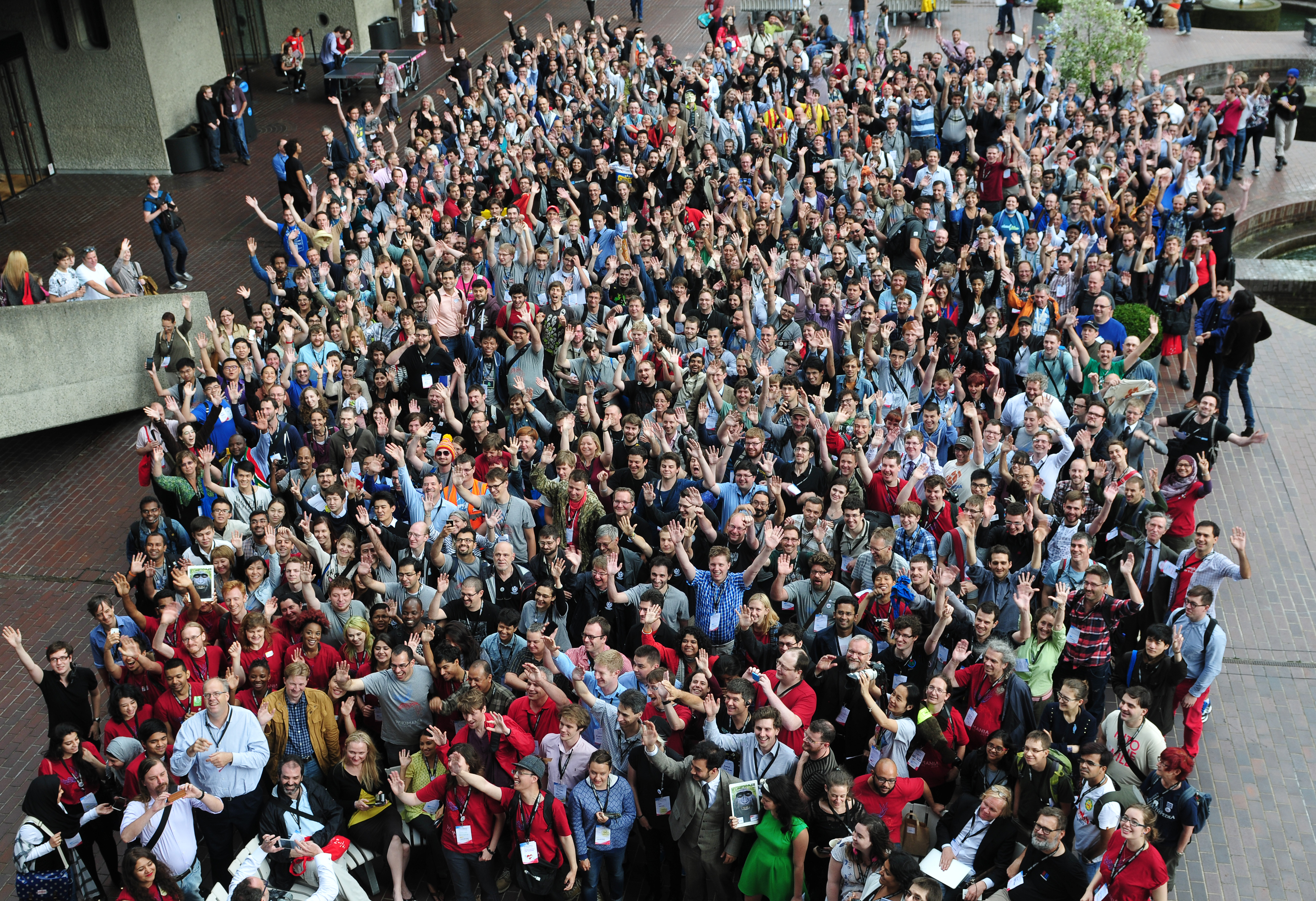
2014 group photo

Wikimania 2014, the tenth Wikimania conference, was held from August 8 to 10, 2014 at the Barbican Centre in London. Bidding officially opened in December 2012. London was chosen in May 2013 as the host city with the only other bid coming from Arusha (Tanzania). The keynote address was given by Salil Shetty, Secretary General of Amnesty International. The event was the first Wikimania addressed by the Wikimedia Foundation's new executive director Lila Tretikov, and was preceded by a two-day hackathon, and a series of fringe events. The conference was documented by the television program 60 Minutes in a program titled 'Wikimania'.

=== 2015 ===
2015 summary

Wikimania 2015, the eleventh Wikimania conference, was held from July 15 to 19, 2015 at the Hotel Hilton Mexico City Reforma in Mexico City. Bidding officially opened in December 2013. Other candidate cities were: Arusha, northern Tanzania; Bali, a province in Indonesia; Cape Town, in South Africa; Dar es Salaam, in Tanzania; Esino Lario, province of Lecco, Lombardy, Italy; and Monastir, in Tunisia. Shortlisted were Mexico City, Cape Town and Monastir. Mexico City was selected in April 2014. The organising entity was Wikimedia México, A.C., the Mexican local chapter representing the interests and goals of the Wikimedia Foundation.

=== 2016 ===
2016 summary

Wikimania 2016, the twelfth Wikimania conference, took place from June 24 to 26, 2016, with peripheral events from June 21 to 28, in the mountain village of Esino Lario, Italy. Esino Lario had bid unsuccessfully for the 2015 Wikimania. The other candidate city that bid for the 2016 hosting was Manila, Philippines. The venue is the first that is not a major city and plenary sessions are in the outdoor venue. During the event, it was announced that the Wikimedia Foundation's interim executive director Katherine Maher was appointed permanently.

From 2015 to 2016, the Wikimedia Foundation ran a consultation with the Wikimedia community about the future of Wikimania, with an outcome that supported experimenting with the conference being "held every other year." At the Esino Lario conference, the Future of Wikimania session saw strong opposition to this idea, and Wikimania would continue to be annual.

=== 2017 ===
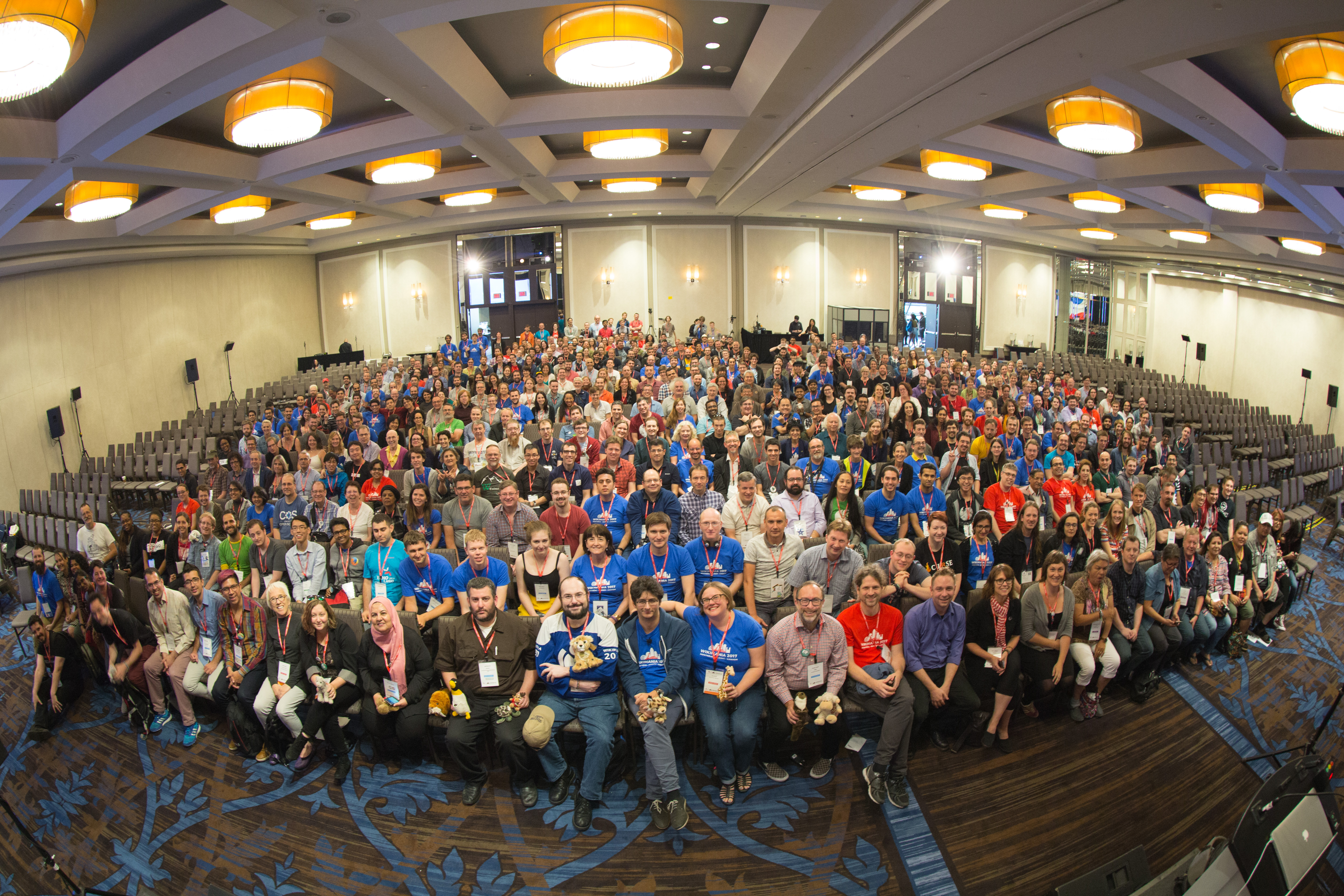
2017 group photo

Wikimania 2017, the thirteenth Wikimania conference, was held at Le Centre Sheraton Hotel in Montreal, Quebec, Canada, from August 9 to 13, 2017. The event was held in Canada during its sesquicentennial anniversary and in Montreal during its 375th anniversary. The first two days included WikiConference North America. Key activities includes discussion on the future direction of the Wikimedia movement under through Wikimedia 2030 strategy. The event also made emphasis on the role of libraries, cultural institutions, and the preservation of indigenous languages, prominently featuring discussions on the Atikamekw Wikipedia project and celebrating collaborative GLAM (Galleries, Libraries, Archives, and Museums) initiatives. Pre-conference activities include archives tour and scan-a-thon organized in partnership with the Bibliothèque et Archives nationales du Québec (BAnQ); held at the BAnQ Vieux-Montréal, where it allowed participants to physically engage with and digitize precious historical materials, including endangered mid-century negatives illustrating the lives of First Nations communities, contributing to the preservation and open accessibility of regional heritage on Wikimedia Commons and Wikisource.

=== 2018 ===
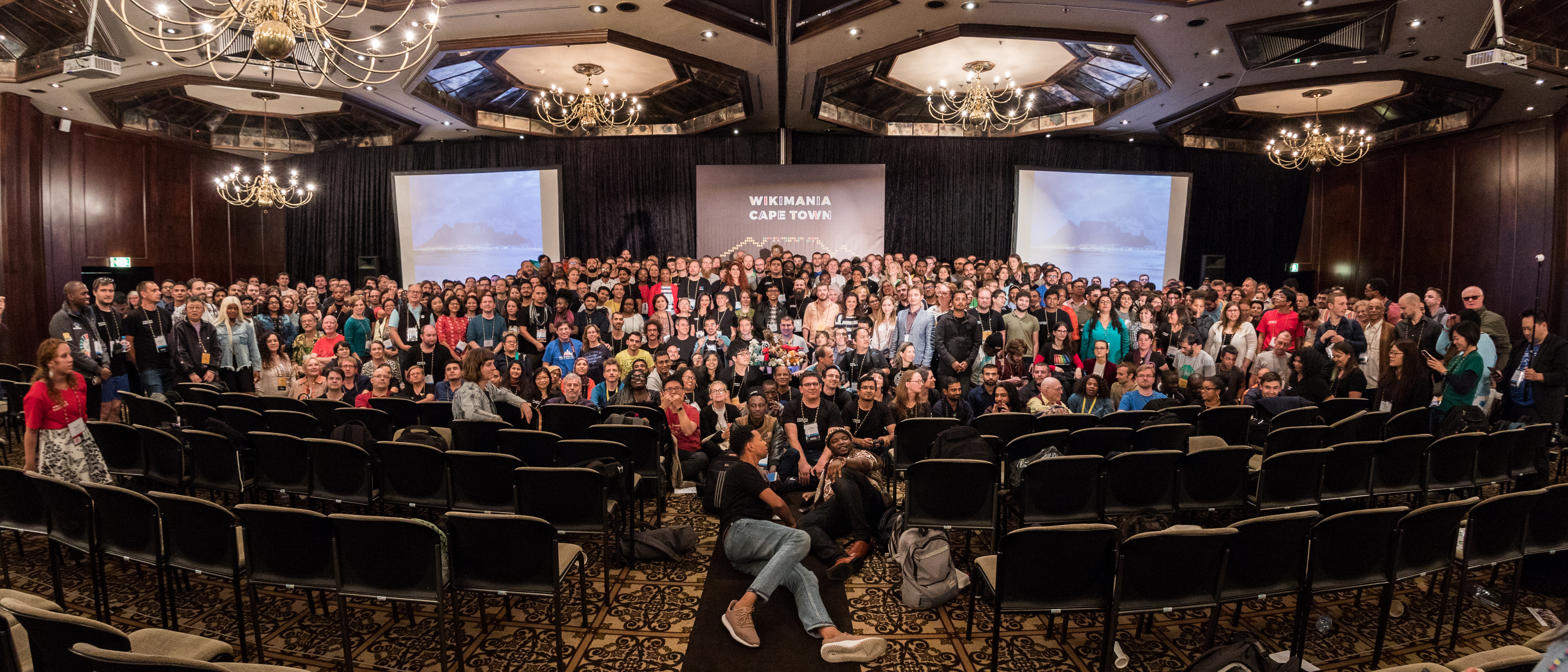
2018 group photo

Wikimania 2018, the fourteenth Wikimania conference, was held in Cape Town, South Africa, from July 18 to 22, 2018 at the Cape Sun Southern Sun Hotel. It was the first time the event was held in Sub-Saharan Africa and having an event theme. The theme was "Bridging Knowledge gaps: the Ubuntu way forward" with the aim of focusing discussion on building shared strategies to bridge the collective knowledge gaps.

=== 2019 ===
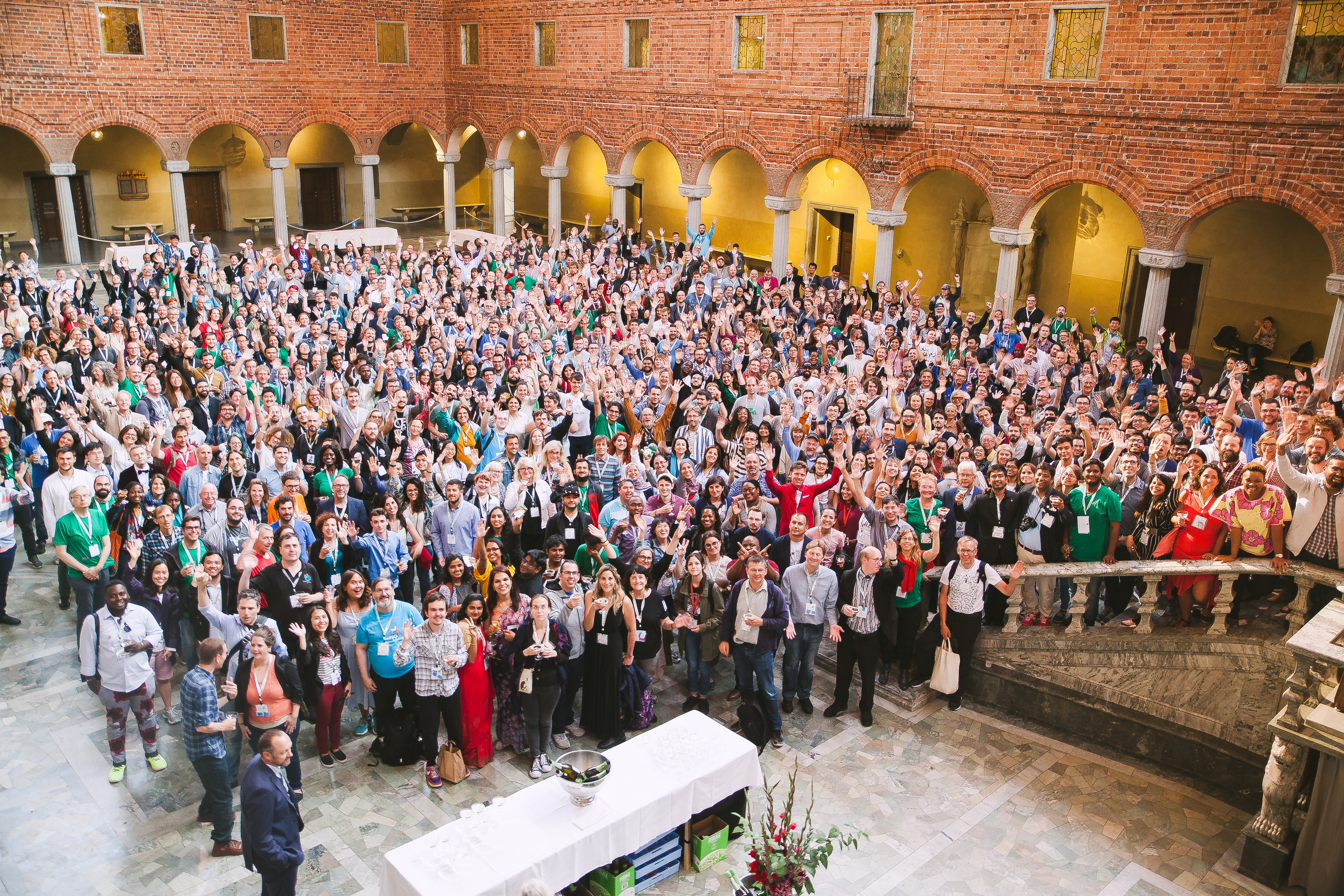
2019 group photo

Wikimania 2019, the fifteenth Wikimedia conference, was held in Stockholm, Sweden, from August 14 to 18, 2019, at the Stockholm University, with an attendance of over 800. The event centered around the theme Stronger Together: Wikimedia, Free Knowledge and the Sustainable Development Goals. As part of the movement's sustainability initiative, The Wikimedia Sverige and the Wikimedia Foundation decided to pay half of the carbon offsetting cost. Terrapass, sponsored the other half of the offsetting for the conference. The Wikimedia Coolest Tool Award was inaugurated in this conference.

=== 2020–2022 ===
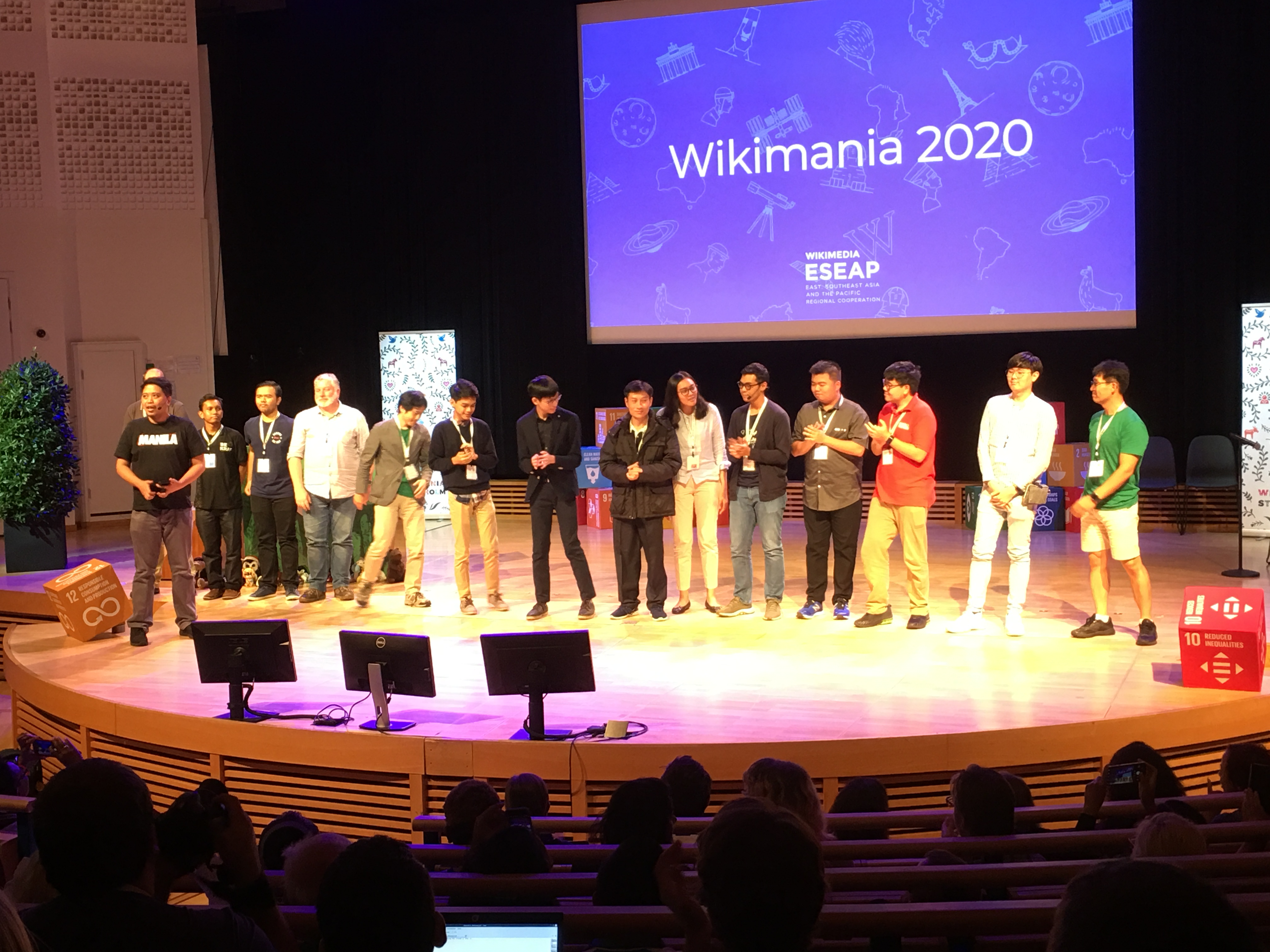
2020 edition presentation in Wikimania 2019

The sixteenth Wikimania conference was scheduled to be held in Bangkok from August 5 to 9, 2020, coinciding with the 15th anniversary of the event. In March 2020, due to the COVID-19 pandemic, Maher announced a postponement until 2021. On January 28, 2021, WMF chief operating officer Janeen Uzzell announced Wikimania would be moving to a virtual event as the ongoing pandemic affected planning for an in-person event. The 2021 edition took place between August 13 and 17, 2021. The scheduled in-person event would have been hosted by Wikimedia ESEAP (East, Southeast Asia and the Pacific), a first time for a regional collaborative. It was going to be the third time it was to be held in Asia and first for Southeast Asia. It was decided that ESEAP would be given a chance to host Wikimania's next in-person edition.

Wikimania 2022 was again an online event but with the waning of the pandemic some cities had in-person events. Officially themed "The Festival Edition," marked a transitional moment by embracing a hybrid format that combined a central virtual program with several vibrant in-person satellite events scattered across the globe. This localized approach allowed contributors to reconnect and celebrate free knowledge face-to-face in their own regions. In Africa, multi-day meetups, edit-a-thons, and training workshops in cities like Cape Town, Johannesburg, and Lagos brought both veteran editors and newcomers together. Wikimedia México hosted a multi-day watch party in Cuernavaca and Xalapa complete with community barbecues, and a lively reprise of the mariachi band from the previous year. Adding a nostalgic touch, the Italian community return to Esino Lario, where Wikimania 2016 happened for a weekend of online session streaming, local museum tours, traditional alpine picnics, and shared meals. Maryana Iskander, as new Chief Executive Officer of the Wikimedia Foundation, made her debut.

=== 2023 ===
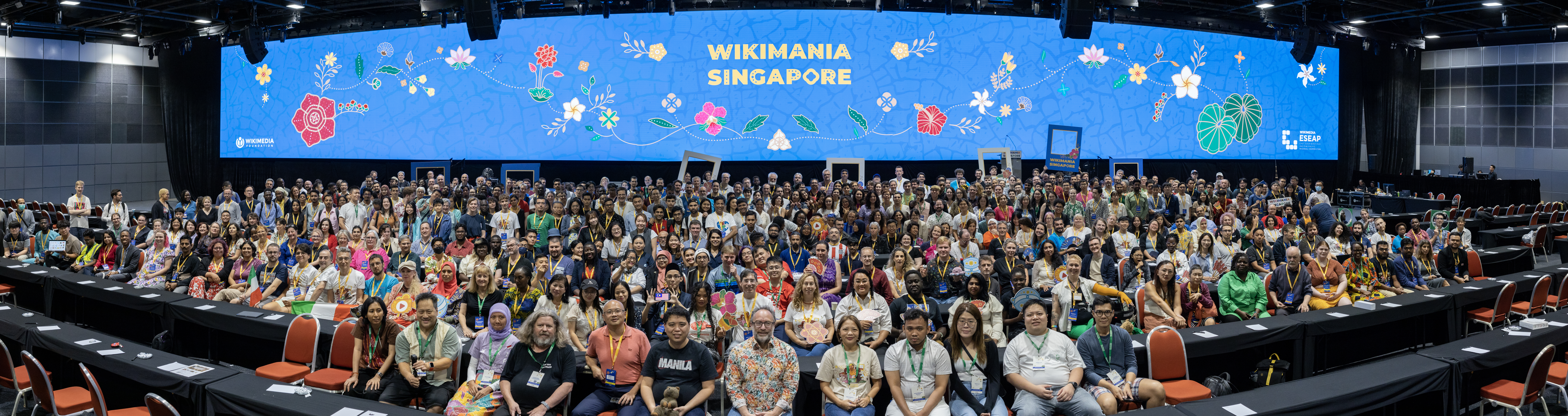
2023 group photo

Wikimania 2023, the eighteenth edition, was held at the Suntec Singapore Convention and Exhibition Centre, in Singapore, and online from August 16 to 19, 2023. It was the first returning in-person event since 2019 and was organized by Wikimedia ESEAP. The theme of the conference was "Diversity. Collaboration. Future." The uses and limitations of generative AI were discussed at length during the conference. Gender participation in the Wikimedia movement was also highlighted in this conference with the introduction of the WikiWomen Summit. Side activities include a visit at Google's Asia-Pacific Regional Head Office, Singapore Botanic Gardens, and Singapore's National Library. New program offerings were introduced in this edition, such as the double podium Lightning talk showcase, and complete newcomer trainings on Wikipedia, Wikidata, Wikimedia Commons, Wikisource and Wiktionary. Entertainment activities include WikiMapathon, WikiRaces, Karaoke, and a WikiFashion Show. The conference closing celebration was held at the Flower dome, Gardens by the Bay.

=== 2024 ===
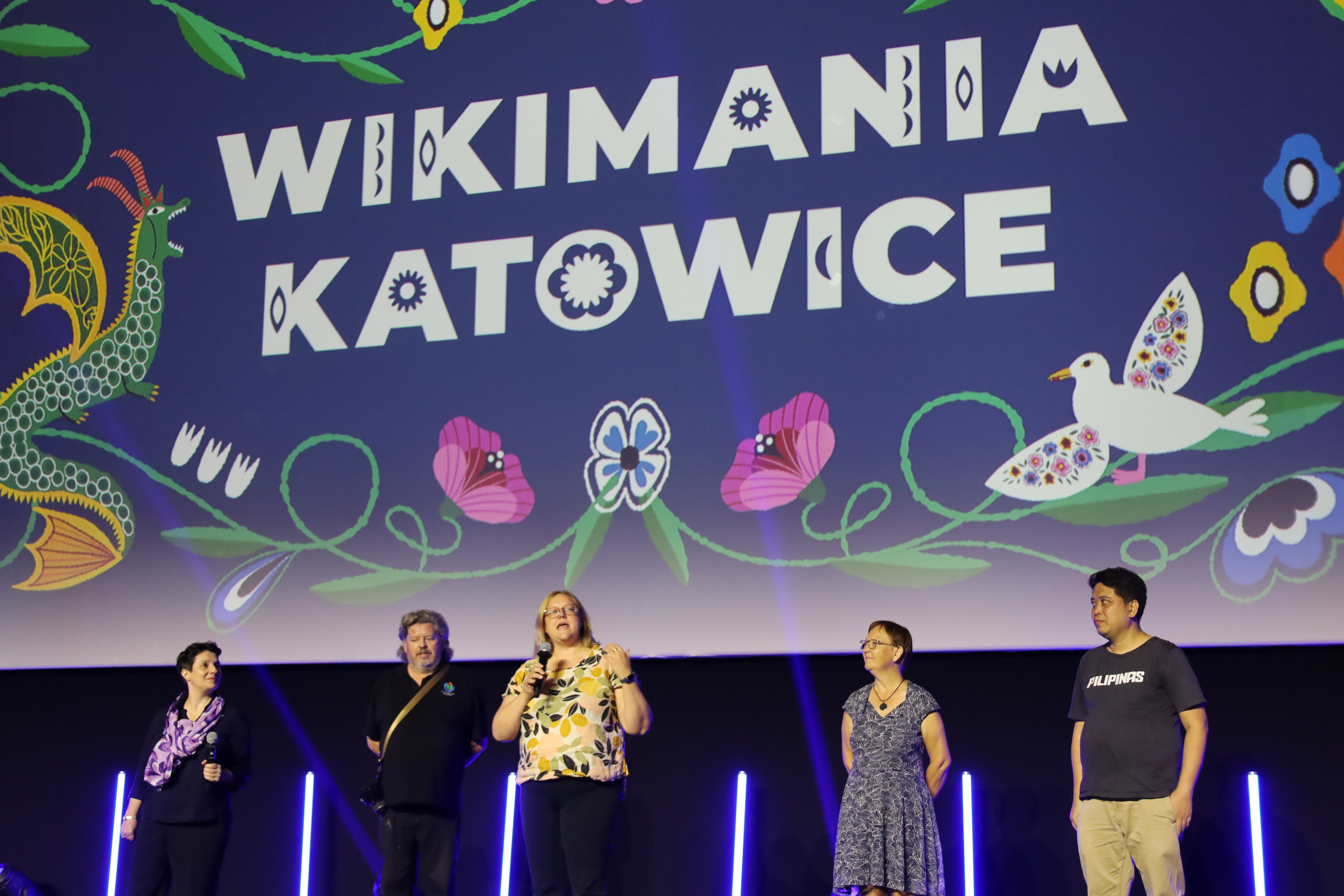
Wikimania 2024 opening reception

Wikimania 2024, the nineteenth edition, was held from August 7 to 10 at the International Congress Centre in Katowice, Poland under the motto Collaboration of the Open. It was organised by the members of the Polish and Central and Eastern Europe communities. Journalist Stephen Harrison from The Guardian described the event as "an event that feels a bit like an international summit of librarians crossed with Comic-Con". It was attended by more than 2200 participants from 143 countries and was covered by more than 100 news pieces.

=== 2025 ===
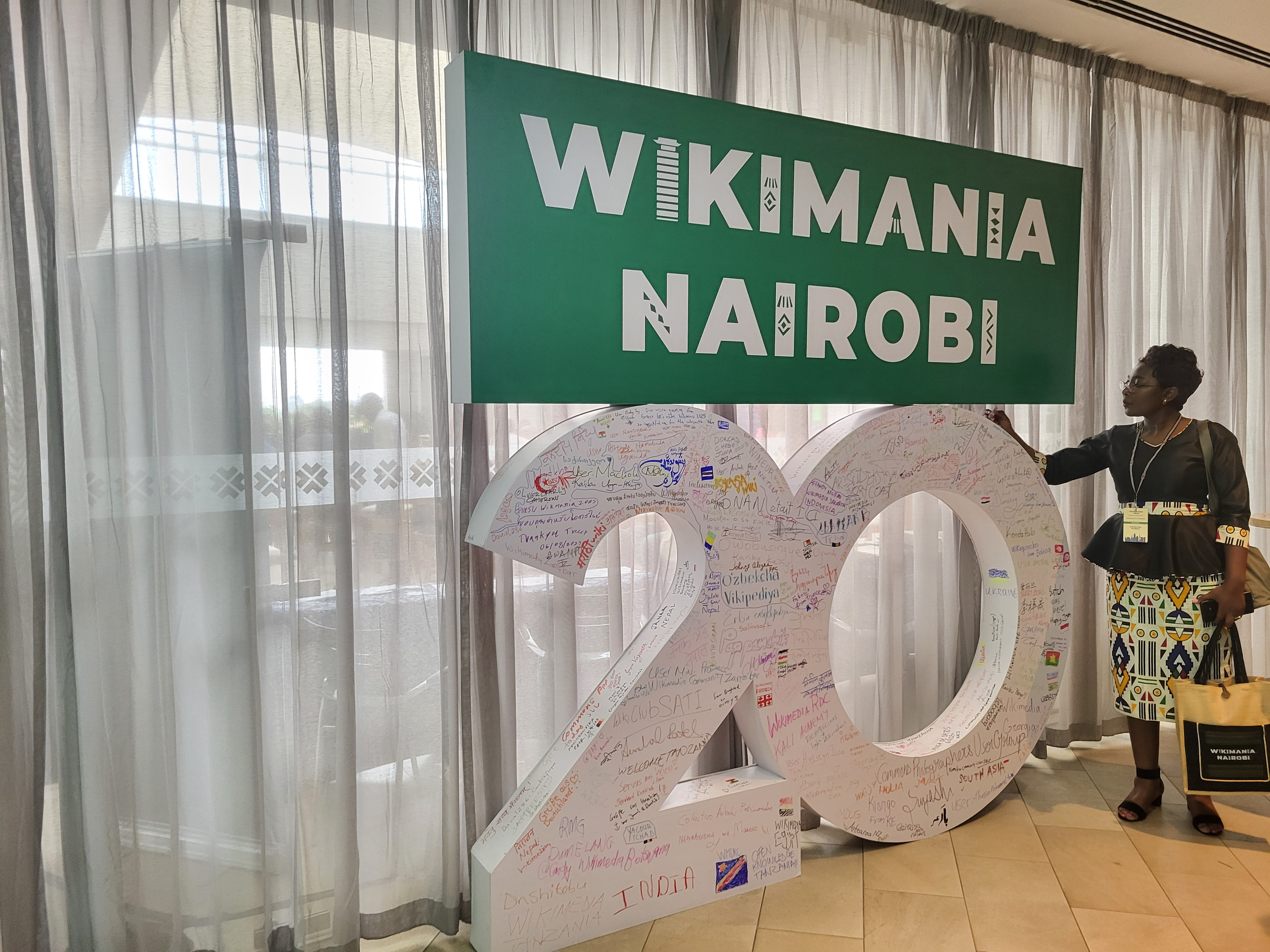
A Wikimania 2025 attendee affixed her message to a giant "20" display

Wikimania 2025, twentieth edition, took place from August 6 to 9, 2025, marking the first time the global conference was hosted in East Africa. Organized by the Wikimedia East Africa Regional and Thematic Hub (Wikimedia EARTH) as a hybrid event physically based in Nairobi, Kenya, under the theme Wikimania@20: Inclusivity. Impact. Sustainability. The four-day event celebrated Wikimania's 20th anniversary, featuring sessions that tackled reducing knowledge and gender gaps, the intersection of open knowledge and artificial intelligence, and strategies for fostering resilient, localized contributor communities worldwide. It also inaugurated the Users with Extended Rights Convening, a specialized gathering which brought together critical community members who hold high-trust roles such as administrators, bureaucrats, checkusers, oversighters, and stewards. Throughout the convening, participants focused heavily on supporting frontline volunteers by discussing key issues like user safety, privacy protocols, the development of more effective moderation tools, cross-wiki collaboration, and strategies for the long-term sustainability of these essential positions.

=== 2026 ===
2026 group photo, featuring the commemorative Wikipedia 25th anniversary logo and mascot

Wikimania 2026, the twenty-first edition, took place from July 21 to 25, 2026. Organized by Wikimédia France in partnership with WikiFranca as a hybrid event physically based in Paris, France, under the theme Liberté, Équité, Fiabilité (Freedom, Equity, Reliability). Part of the gathering was the celebration of the 25th anniversary of the pioneer Wikipedias. Bernadette Meehan, as new Chief Executive Officer of the Wikimedia Foundation, made her debut.

Introduced at this edition was the Team Challenges. It operated as a structured group activity connected to the Wikimania Hackathon but separate from the main conference. Technical coordinators assigned registered participants based on a quota system that requires equal numbers of software developers and individuals without technical backgrounds, local French residents and international attendees, and experienced Wikimedians and new contributors. These resulting groups worked to resolve eleven distinct operational problems affecting Wikimedia projects. Among the assigned tasks were finding broken reference links, updating older article illustrations, identifying text biases, and building data dashboards for environmental pages. Following an initial online planning phase from July 1 to July 15, attendees finalized their projects on July 21 and July 22. Winners were awarded on the final day of the conference.

== See also ==
- Wiki Indaba conference in Africa
- WikiConference India
- WikiConference North America
