= Project Lingua =

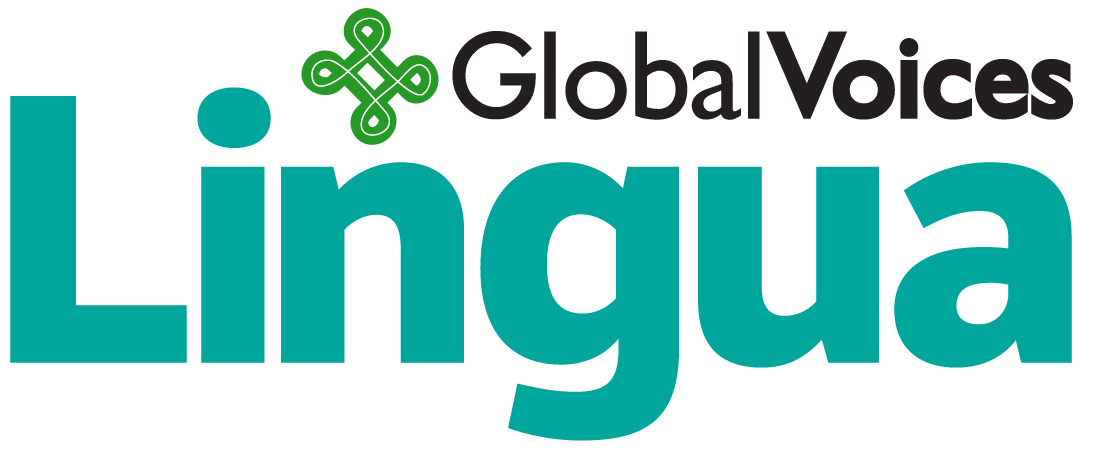
- Formation: Dec 2006
- Purpose: Open lines of communication with non-english speaking bloggers by translating articles from Global Voices Online
- Region served: Global
- Official language: Albanian, Amharic, Arabic, Aymara, Bangla, Bulgarian, Burmese, Catalan, Czech, Chinese (Simplified), Chinese (Traditional), Danish, Dutch, Esperanto, Farsi, French, Filipino, German, Greek, Hebrew, Hindi, Hungarian, Igbo, Indonesian, Italian, Japanese, Kazakh, Khmer, Kurdish, Korean, Malagasy, Macedonian, Nubian, Odia, Pashto, Polish, Portuguese, Punjabi, Russian, Santali, Serbian, Spanish, Swahili, Swedish, Tetum, Turkish, Ukrainian, Urdu, Uzbek, Yorùbá
- Parent organization: Global Voices Online
- Website: globalvoices.org/lingua

Project Lingua, or just Lingua is an online translation community formed in the end of 2006 with the goal of translating articles from the global citizen media project Global Voices Online from English into other languages, opening lines of distributed communication between bloggers across the world. The project currently translates into tens of different languages, and incorporates an active team of hundreds of volunteer translators and translation editors. Along with the Cucumis project and the Wikipedia's own translation projects in every language, such as the Wikipedia:ECHO, Lingua is considered one of the largest volunteer-based online translation communities in the world.

== Origin of the Project ==
Lingua began as a community-based initiative by Taiwanese blogger Portnoy Zheng, who started translating Global Voices articles into Chinese as early as September, 2005. This initial idea became a project of its own at the Global Voices Summit in December 2006, where it was given the name "Lingua".

The first official Lingua sites, launched by June 2007, were Chinese (both Simplified and Traditional), Bangla, Farsi, Spanish, Portuguese, and French. The project has since grown rapidly in size and scope. Global Voices is translated in all the top languages used on the internet but also include under-represent and indigenous languages, such as Aymara. Translators apply via the Translation Application Form.

As of April 2025, Global Voices is available in the following languages:

Active sites	Dormant sites
Arabic	Albanian
Aymara	Amharic
Bangla	Bulgarian
Chinese (Simplified)	Burmese
Chinese (Traditional)	Catalan
Dutch	Czech
Esperanto	Danish
Filipino	Farsi
French	Hebrew
German	Hungarian
Greek	Igbo
Hindi	Kazakh
Indonesian	Khmer
Italian	Korean
Japanese	Kurdish
Macedonian	Odia
Malagasy	Polish
Nepali	Swahili
Portuguese	Swedish
Punjabi	Tetum
Romanian	Turkish
Russian	Urdu
Santali	Uzbek
Serbian	
Spanish	
Ukrainian	
Yorùbá	

== Collaborations ==
Lingua has content-sharing/partnerships (formal and informal) with news sites and other online organizations, such as:

- Arabic: Al Jazeera Talk
- Bangla: Biborton Bangla (news/entertainment site, literary magazine)
- Chinese: China Times, Memedia ("Strawberry") (news site), Peopo (Taiwanese citizen news site hosted by the Taiwan Broadcasting Service)
- Italian: Agoravox Italia, Rainews24, La Stampa
- French: Rue 89, Cucumis, Rezo.net
- Portuguese: Mozambican newspaper A Verdade
- Spanish: Canal Solidario, Periodismo Ciudadano, El Colombiano

Lingua has also partnered with like minded organisations to provide translations. In August 2012, Lingua launched a collaborative effort to translate the Declaration of Internet Freedom providing the text in 31 languages.
