= Katherine Maher =

American media executive (born 1983)

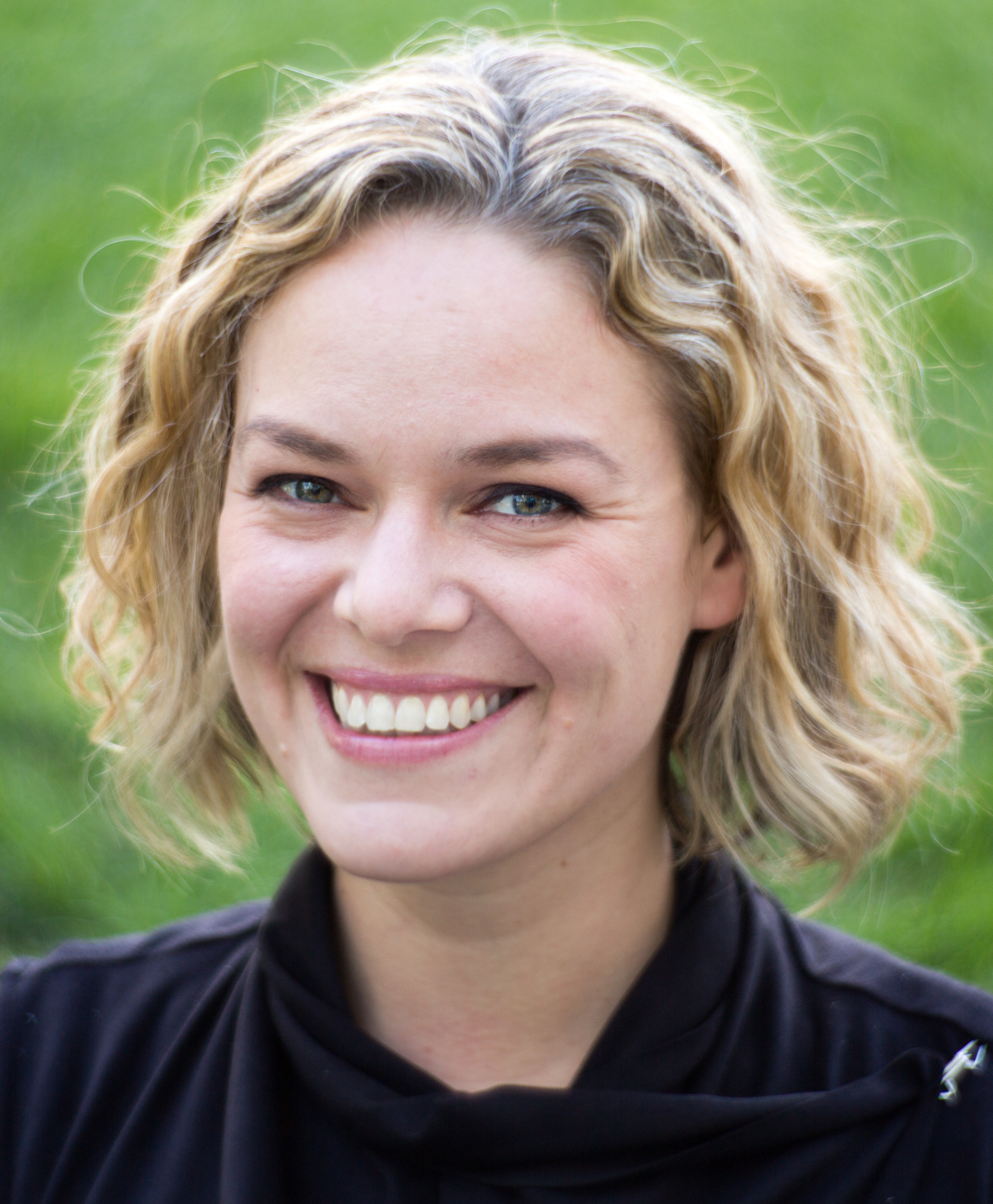
- Maher in 2016

President and CEO of NPR
- Incumbent
- Assumed office March 24, 2024

1st Chief Executive Officer of the Wikimedia Foundation
- In office January 30, 2019 – April 2021
- Preceded by: Position established
- Succeeded by: Maryana Iskander

4th Executive Director of the Wikimedia Foundation
- In office March 2016 – January 29, 2019
- Preceded by: Lila Tretikov
- Succeeded by: Position disestablished

Personal details
- Born: Katherine Roberts Maher; April 18, 1983 (age 43) Wilton, Connecticut, U.S.
- Spouse: Ashutosh Upreti (m. 2023)
- Parent: Ceci Maher (mother)
- Education: The American University in Cairo; Institut français d'études arabes de Damas; New York University (BA)
- Occupation: Non-profit executive
- Maher introducing herself recorded June 2016

Maher congratulating Wikidata's fifth anniversary in 2017

Katherine Roberts Maher (/mɑːr/ MAR; born April 18, 1983) is an American non-profit executive who has been the chief executive officer (CEO) and president of National Public Radio since March 2024. Prior to NPR, she was the CEO of Web Summit and chair of the board of directors at the Signal Foundation. She is a former chief executive officer and executive director of the Wikimedia Foundation.

A member of the Council on Foreign Relations, Maher worked for UNICEF, the National Democratic Institute, the World Bank and Access Now before joining the Wikimedia Foundation. She subsequently joined the Atlantic Council and the US Department of State's Foreign Affairs Policy Board.

== Early life and education ==
Maher grew up in Wilton, Connecticut, and attended Wilton High School. Her father, Gordon Roberts Maher, worked in finance in New York City, and died in 2020. Her mother, Ceci Maher, is a former non-profit executive who was elected to the Connecticut State Senate in 2022.

After high school, Maher graduated from the Arabic Language Institute's Arabic Language Intensive Program of The American University in Cairo in 2003, which she recalled as a formative experience that developed her interest in the Middle East. Maher also studied at the Institut français d'études arabes de Damas in Syria and spent time in Lebanon and Tunisia.

In 2005, Maher received a bachelor's degree from New York University in Middle Eastern and Islamic studies.

== Career ==
=== Early career ===
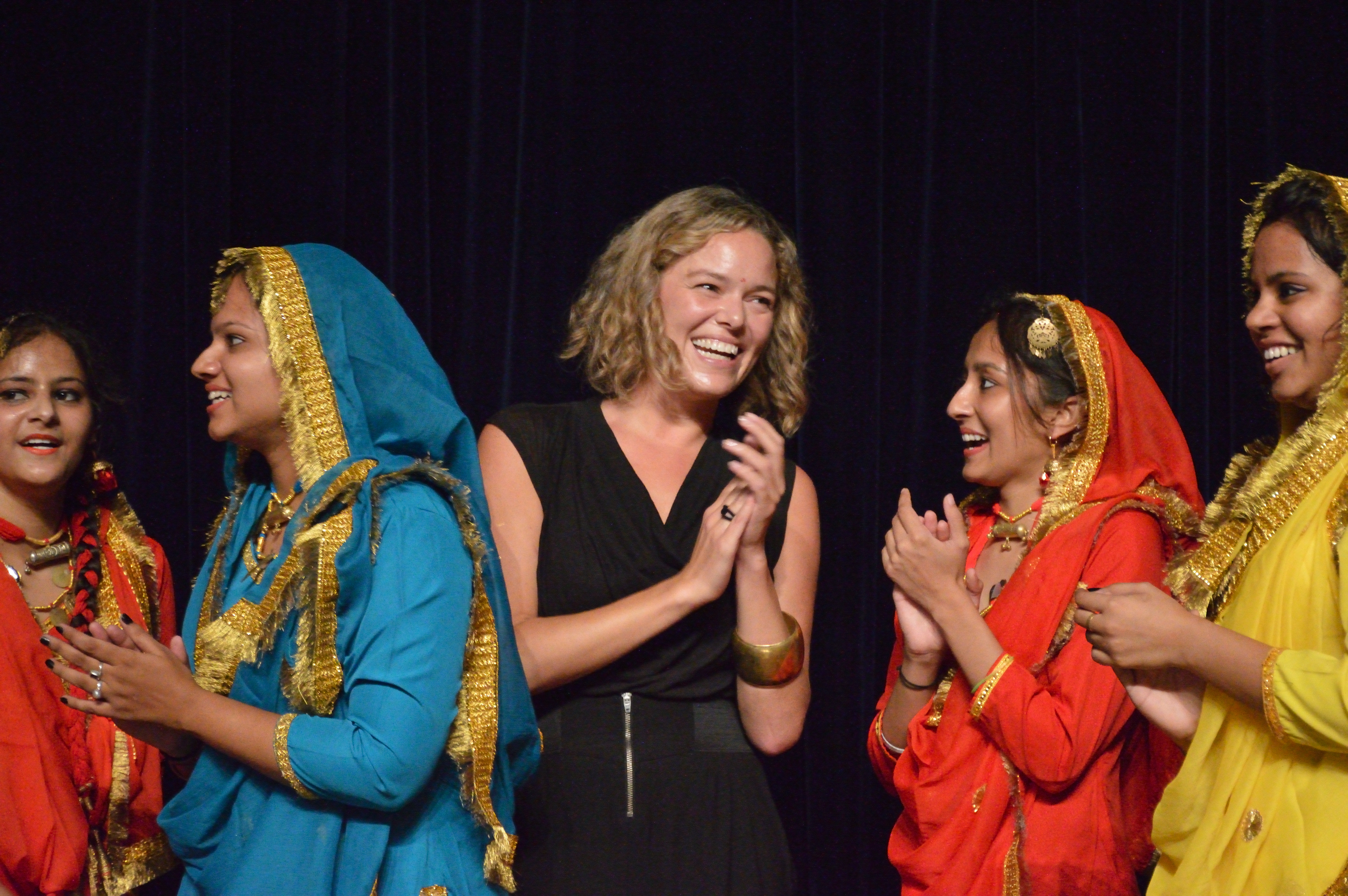
Katherine Maher with giddha dancers at WikiConference India 2016

From 2007 to 2010, Maher worked in New York City, at UNICEF, as an innovation and communication officer.

From 2010 to 2011, Maher worked at the National Democratic Institute as an ICT program officer. From 2011 to 2013, Maher worked at the World Bank as an ICT innovation specialist and consulted on technology for international development and democratization. In 2012, Maher's Twitter feed on issues related to the Middle East was noted for its coverage of the Arab Spring.

From 2013 to 2014, Maher was advocacy director at the Washington, D.C.-based Access Now. As part of this work, she focused on the impact on people of laws about cybersecurity, morality, and defamation of the state that increase state censorship and reduce dissent. Access was a signatory of the Declaration of Internet Freedom.

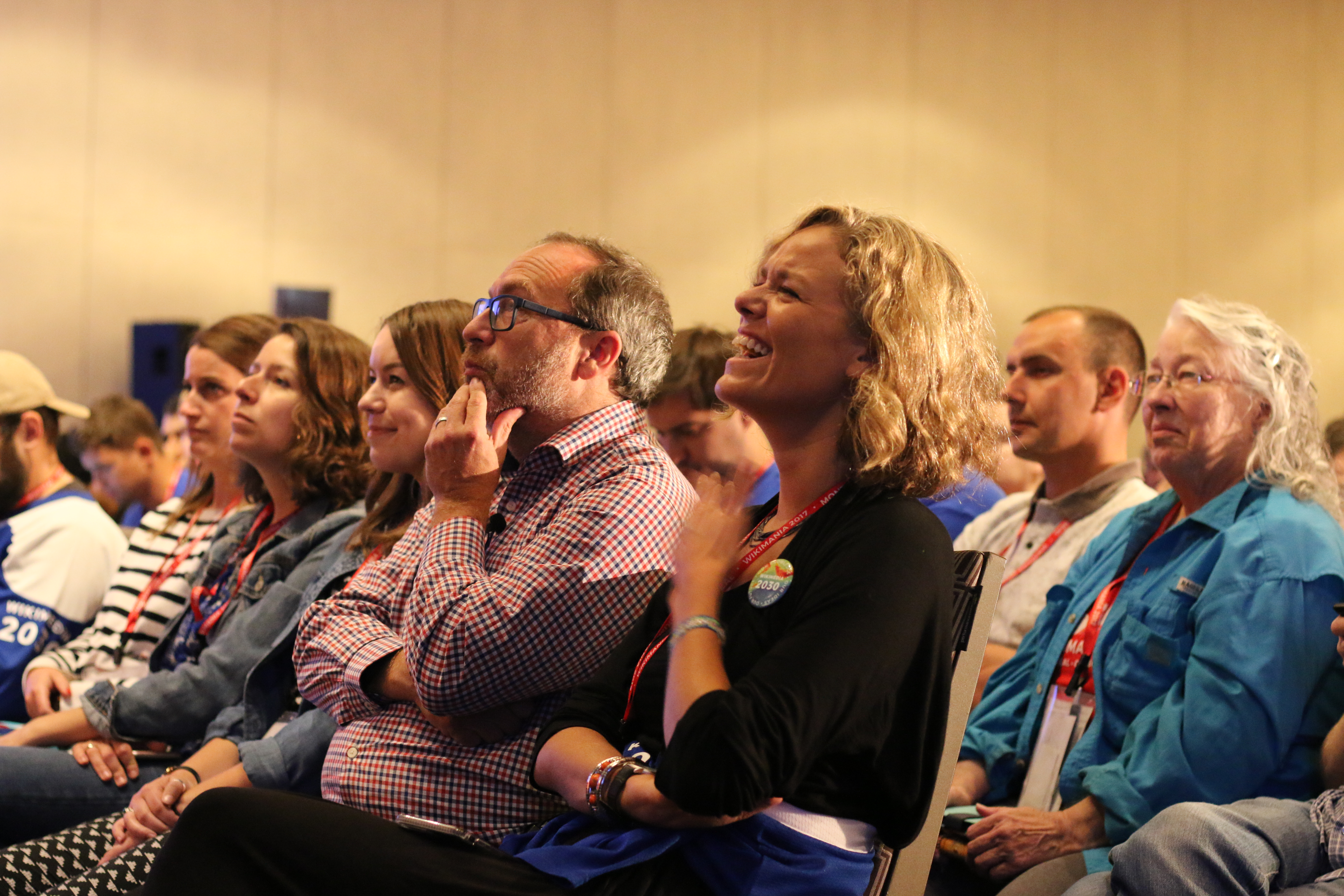
Maher and Jimmy Wales at Wikimania 2017

=== Wikimedia Foundation ===
Maher was chief communications officer of the Wikimedia Foundation from April 2014 to March 2016. She became interim executive director in March 2016 following the resignation of executive director Lila Tretikov and was appointed executive director on June 23, 2016; the position was subsequently retitled as "executive director and CEO".

Maher stepped down from her positions as CEO and executive director of the Wikimedia Foundation on April 15, 2021. Maryana Iskander was appointed as her successor.

Maher states that she focuses on global digital inclusion as a way to improve and protect people's rights to information through technology. In a speech to the Atlantic Council Maher spoke about the challenge of combating disinformation, particularly around critical events like elections and the COVID-19 pandemic. She described the First Amendment as a "number one challenge" in regulating content and fighting disinformation. In a TED talk that Maher gave shortly after leaving the Wikimedia Foundation, she stated, "our reverence for the truth might be a distraction that's getting in the way of finding common ground and getting things done". Critics later seized upon on the quote to question Maher's commitment to objectivity.

=== US State Department ===
From 2022 to 2023, Maher was a member of the United States Department of State's Foreign Affairs Policy Board, an expert panel established in 2011 by then-Secretary of State Hillary Clinton to advise US officials. As of 2023, she chairs the board of directors of the Signal Foundation. She is also the board chair of nonprofit organization, Adventure Scientists as of January 2023. In October of that year, Web Summit appointed Maher as its new chief executive, to replace Paddy Cosgrave.

=== National Public Radio ===
In January 2024, Maher was named CEO of NPR, and started her job in late March. She subsequently resigned from the Foreign Affairs Policy Board, but continued on the board of the Signal Foundation. She transitioned to the role of non-executive chairperson at Web Summit in March 2024 after only three months as CEO.

In April 2024, Uri Berliner, NPR senior business editor, published an essay in The Free Press critiquing, among other things, alleged liberal bias at NPR both in management and content, leading to an erosion of trust with the public and with internal staff. Following Berliner's critique, conservative journalists and activists, including Christopher Rufo, criticized Maher for tweets she had made supporting progressive policies and about Donald Trump in 2018, as well as comments Maher made about the First Amendment as "the number one challenge" in the fight against disinformation in a 2021 interview. Berliner was suspended without pay for five days, ostensibly for failing to secure approval for "outside work". On April 17, he resigned after 25 years at NPR and criticized Maher's appointment as CEO. In response to the criticisms, Maher defended NPR's record, stating that her comments regarding the First Amendment had been misrepresented and that she has a "robust belief in the First Amendment".

In May 2024, the House Committee on Energy and Commerce requested an appearance by Maher as part of their investigation into "allegations of political and ideological bias at the national program producing office of National Public Radio" as a taxpayer-funded public radio organization. Maher declined to appear due to a scheduling conflict, as she was already scheduled to meet with NPR's board all day on the same date as the committee's hearing.

Later that month, Maher approved and announced a new editing group for NPR, called "the Backstop", which caused internal anxiety. Numerous employees expressed concern that the additional layer of review, comprising six editors and funded by an unknown donor, was insufficiently transparent, might be redundant, and might impede NPR's journalistic process. There were also concerns that the creation of the Backstop could be interpreted as a defensive reaction to Berliner's essay.

In August 2024, while co-hosting the Public Media Development and Marketing Conference, Maher stated she believed her gender played a role in the scrutiny she faced after being named NPR CEO.

In March 2025, Maher appeared before a House subcommittee on government efficiency in a hearing entitled "Anti-American Airwaves: Holding the Heads of NPR and PBS Accountable," to defend NPR against allegations of bias. Subsequently, funding for the Corporation for Public Broadcasting, which provides some federal funds to NPR and its member stations, was rescinded.

== Personal life ==
Maher married Ashutosh Upreti, a former lawyer for Lyft and Apple, in July 2023. As of December 2025, she is pregnant and expecting to take maternity leave.

== Honors ==
- In 2013, The Diplomatic Courier named Maher as one of 99 leading foreign policy professionals under age 33.
- 2025 – National Press Foundation W.M. Kiplinger Distinguished Contributions to Journalism Award

== Works and publications ==
- Maher, Katherine (December 2010). "Food Fights—Nick Cullather's The Hungry World: America's Cold War Battle Against Poverty in Asia". Bookforum.
- Maher, Katherine (March 21, 2011). "SXSW festival takes on board use of technology for social impact". The Guardian.
- Maher, Katherine (August 17, 2012). "Did the Bounds of Cyber War Just Expand to Banks and Neutral States?". The Atlantic.
- Raja, Siddhartha; Melhem, Samia; Cruse, Matthew; Goldstein, Joshua; Maher, Katherine; Minges, Michael; Surya, Priya (August 2012). "Chapter 6: Making Government Mobile" (PDF). Information and Communications for Development 2012: Maximizing Mobile. Washington, DC: World Bank. pp. 87–101. doi:10.1596/9780821389911_ch06. ISBN 978-0-8213-8991-1. OCLC 895048866.
- Maher, Katherine; York, Jillian C. (2013). "Origins of the Tunisian Internet". In Hussain, Muzammil M.; Howard, Philip N. (eds.). State Power 2.0: Authoritarian Entrenchment and Political Engagement Worldwide. Burlington, VT: Ashgate Publishing Group. ISBN 978-1-4094-5469-4. OCLC 940726016.
- Maher, Katherine (February 25, 2013). "The New Westphalian Web: The future of the Internet may lie in the past. And that's not a good thing". Foreign Policy. Archived from the original on March 5, 2015.
- Maher, Katherine (March 19, 2014). "No, the U.S. Isn't 'Giving Up Control' of the Internet". Politico. Archived from the original on August 6, 2020.
- Maher, Katherine (December 5, 2016). "The Sum of All Knowledge" (Video). Google Talks.
- Maher, Katherine (October 4, 2017). "How Wikipedia Changed The Exchange Of Knowledge (And Where It's Going Next)". Forbes.
- Maher, Katherine (October 17, 2017). "Will Wikipedia Exist in 20 Years?" (Video). Berkman Klein Center for Internet and Society at Harvard University.
- Maher, Katherine (March 12, 2019). "Without Humans, A.I. Can Wreak Havoc". The New York Times.

== See also ==
- List of Wikipedia people
