= Hilton Mexico City Reforma =

Hilton hotel in Mexico City, Mexico

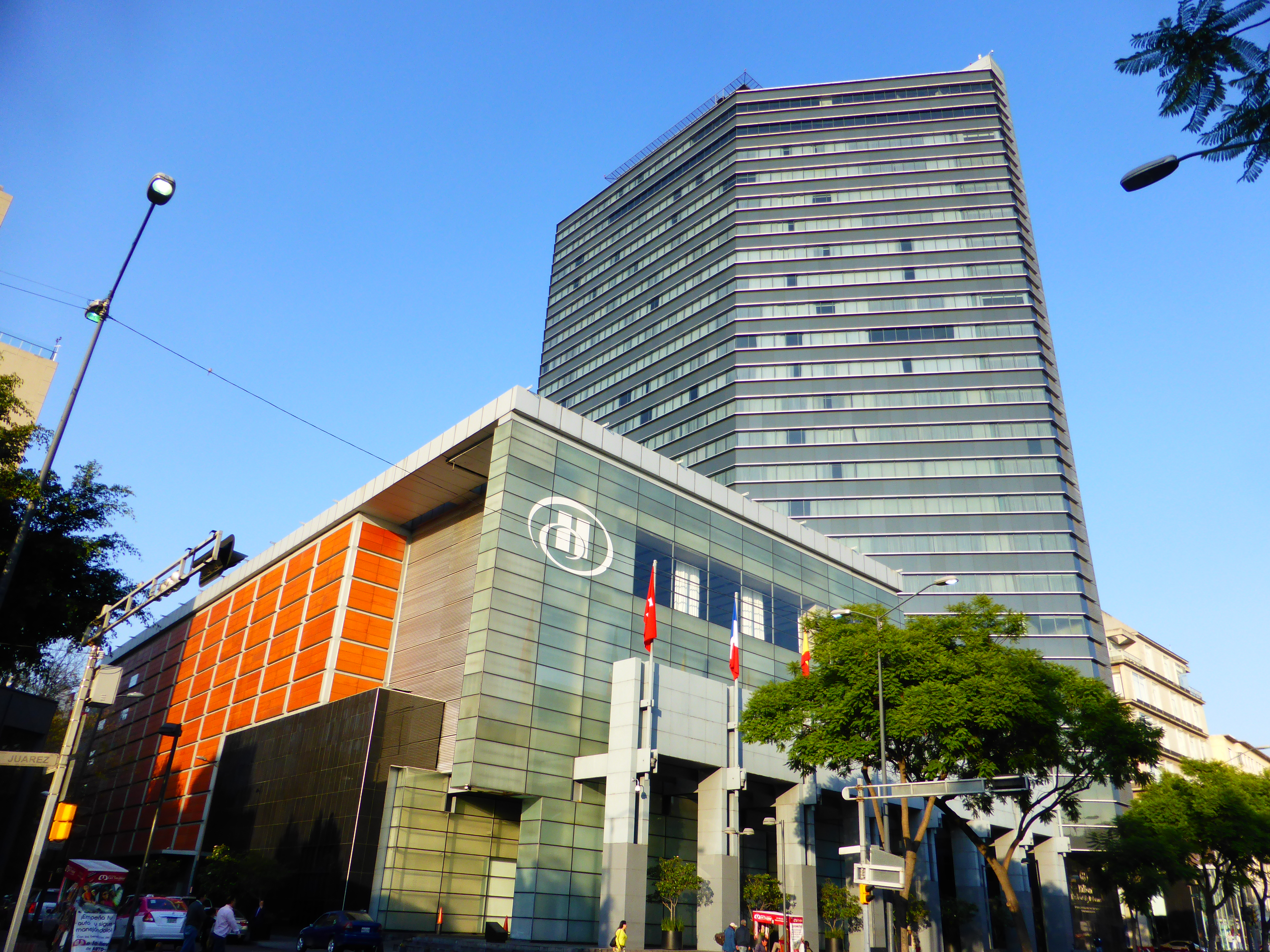
- Hilton Mexico City Reforma
- Location in Mexico City

General information
- Location: Mexico City, Mexico
- Coordinates: 19°26′4.02″N 99°8′47.47″W
- Construction started: 2001
- Completed: 2003
- Opened: February 27, 2003

Height
- Height: 107 metres (351 ft)

The Hilton Mexico City Reforma is a 24-story, 457-room hotel on Avenida Juárez, close to the Alameda Central, in Mexico City, Mexico.

== Description ==
The hotel opened on February 27, 2003, as the Sheraton Centro Historico Hotel & Convention Center. It was designed by Pascal Arquitectos, developed by Inmobiliaria Interpres and constructed from 2001 to 2003, with Proarquitectura as the main contractor and Aguilar Ingenieros as the structural engineer.

It was the first tall building to be constructed in the area since the 1985 Mexico City earthquake, The concrete structure is 107 metres (351 ft) tall, with 24 stories above ground and 2 below. It has 457 rooms and a total floor area of 69,226 square metres (745,140 sq ft), with a building footprint of 66,000 square feet (6,100 m^{2}). It has a helipad on the roof, and a 60,000 square feet (5,600 m^{2}) convention centre with a capacity of 5,000 people.

The hotel was built on the site of the historic Hotel del Prado, constructed in 1948 and demolished in 1985, due to structural damage from the earthquake.

The Sheraton Centro Historico received a special jury recognition by the Bienal de Interiorismo de Bellas Artes in September 2003, an IMEI award (smart building) in December 2003, and was an award winner in the Tourism category of the Peremio Nacional de Interiorismo in July 2006.

The hotel joined Hilton Hotels on December 2, 2009, and was renamed Hilton Mexico City Reforma.

It was the venue for Wikimania 2015. The hotel interior was renovated in 2018.
