= Flitto =

Global crowdsourcing translation platform

Flitto Inc.
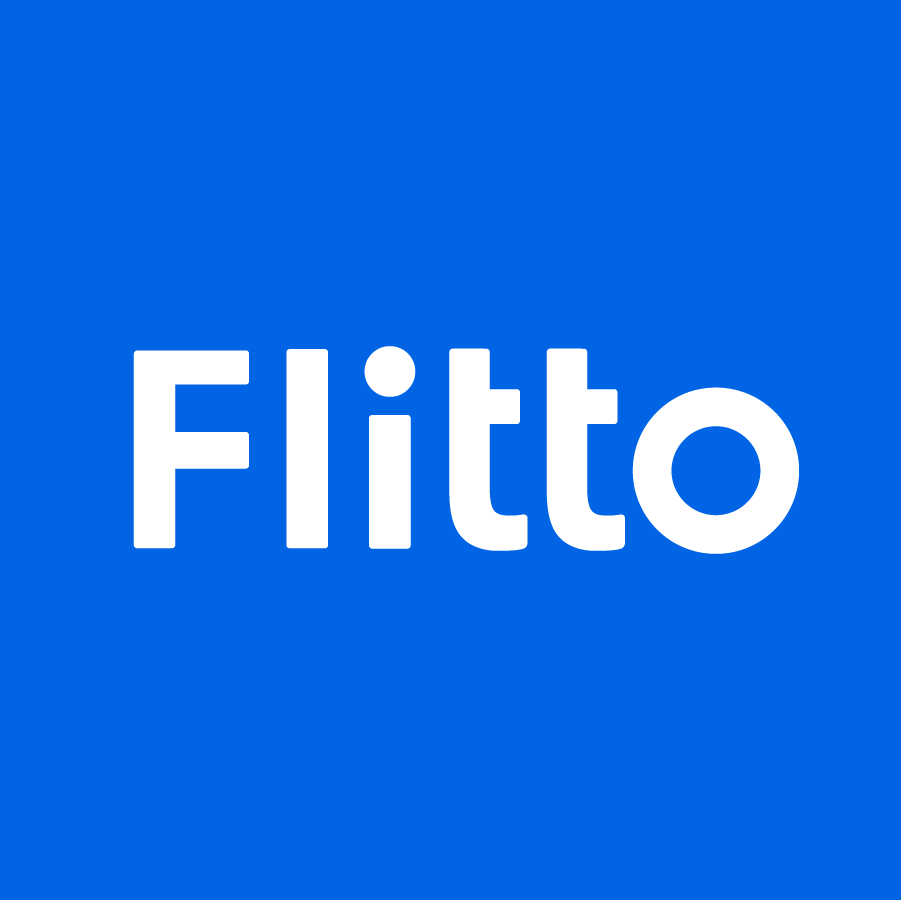
- Company type: Public
- Industry: Translation, Social
- Founded: September 1, 2012; 13 years ago
- Founder: Simon Lee CEO, Founder; Dan Kang CTO, Co-founder; Jin Kim CSO, Co-founder
- Headquarters: Gangnam-gu, Seoul, South Korea
- Products: Crowdsourced Translation services
- Number of employees: 111
- Website: www.flitto.com

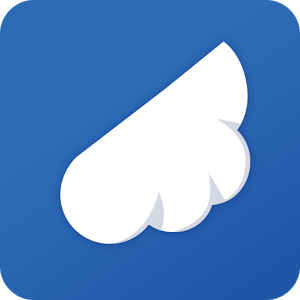
Flitto Launcher Icon

Flitto (Korean: 플리토) is a crowdsourcing translation platform where users can request or provide translations. Users are also able to read various online content in their native languages.

The service supports text, image, and voice translations, and 1:1 translation in 25 different languages.

Flitto's current user estimate is 5+ million and is being used in 170 countries, with about 300K translations submitted daily.

== History ==
Flitto was incorporated on September 1, 2012, by founder Simon Lee along with co-founders Dan Kang and Jin Kim. The company was selected as the first Asian company to join SpringBoard incubation program in London (now Techstars London) the same year. Flitto's first official office was located at MARU180, a start-up center, located in Yeoksam-dong, Seoul. Its current office is located in Samseong-dong, Seoul.

== Services ==
=== Point ===
Points are required to request crowdsourcing translation. Points can be purchased, or earned by submitting translations and having them selected.

=== Text ===
Users can request texts in 25 different languages by using points. Although Flitto shows the recommended points for each request, the user can manually change it. The requests will be pushed to different users who are capable of translating in the requested language, allowing them to translate for points.

Depending on the length of the text, the user can manually divide the text into short sections so that the request can be sent to different translator-users; which can shorten the lead time since sections can be translated at the same time by different translators. In order to keep consistency for translated text, requestors can leave a memo for the translators. The translators are able to read the full text, as well as translations other users have made on other parts of the text.

=== Image/GPS ===
In situations where users feel difficult to cumbersome to make requests in form of text, they have the option to make translation requests by simply taking a picture of the subject and posting it on Flitto. Also, using the GPS function, users can see image translations that have been done previously by other users within nearby areas upon requesting image translations.

=== Voice ===
Users can also record voices/sounds and make translation requests on Flitto when they are not able to understand that particular language.

=== 1:1 Translation ===
Flitto links experienced translators with people/companies seeking high-quality translation through a 1:1 translation service.

=== Discovery (SNS/Contents) ===
Popular SNS accounts ranging from celebrities to media groups are translated into different languages. Brazilian author Paulo Coelho uses the service.

=== Store ===
Users can spend the points they earned on Flitto's Store to purchase items, donate, or cash out.

=== QR Code ===
Users can scan the QR codes from Flitto's App and get the translation. Scanning the QR code will reveal the request and translation without having to log in.

== Achievements ==
2012.09 - Received $800,000 seed investment from DSC Investment
2012.09 - Selected to participate in TechStars London incubation program (First Asian company to be part of the TechStars network)
2012.10 - 1st place at Innovative Tech Startup, organized by Morrison & Foerster (London)
2012.12 - 1st Asian company selected as Silicon Valley IR Company
2012.12 - Selected as one of the 5 picks from the 2012 Springboard Demo Day in Silicon Valley
2012.12 - 1st Asian company to make IR presentation at Facebook HQ
2013.03 - Selected to be part of the Korean Pavilion at SXSW 2013
2013.05 - Selected as a company to represent the creative economy by the Ministry of Science, ICT and Future Planning
2013.05 - 1st place at Mobile Start-up Korea Superstar, organized by MK News
2013.07 - Set an office in Silicon Valley
2013.08 - Selected to represent Seoul at the Seedstars World Competition (Switzerland)
2013.09 - Selected to be part of the Korean Pavilion at TechCrunch SF 2013
2013.09 - Made official launch for Flitto at TechCrunch Disrupt
2013.10 - Selected by the Israeli government to represent Korea for Start Tel Aviv (Championship)
2013.12 - Selected as the "Best Startup" at the Global K-Startup Program organized by the Korea Internet Security Agency and Plug and Play
2013.12 - Won the final round at Golden Pentagon (KBS)
2014.02 - Won 1st place at Seedstars World Competition (Switzerland)
2014.07 - Won grand prize at IDEAS Show Start-up Battle (Taiwan)
2015.03 - Opened a branch office in Beijing, China
2015.10 - Won the DemoTheWorld and Acquired ICP License (China)

== Press attention ==
2013.03 - Selected as one of "The Top 7 Things You Missed at SXSW" - Kansas City Business Journal
2014.09 - Covered by CNN International in the article, 'Korean Tech Giants'
2015.01 - Covered by Tech In Asia in the article, 'Korean entrepreneur went from translating K-Pop tweets to selling language data to web giants'
2015.04 - Featured on BBC as the first episode of the series, 'The Making of Me', along with an article, 'From homework to a global business'
2016.01 - Featured on KBS1 New Year Special "Youth, South Korea"

== See also ==
- Babelnet
- vidby
- BigTranslation
- Cucumis (website)
