= Sue Gardner =

Canadian journalist (born 1967)

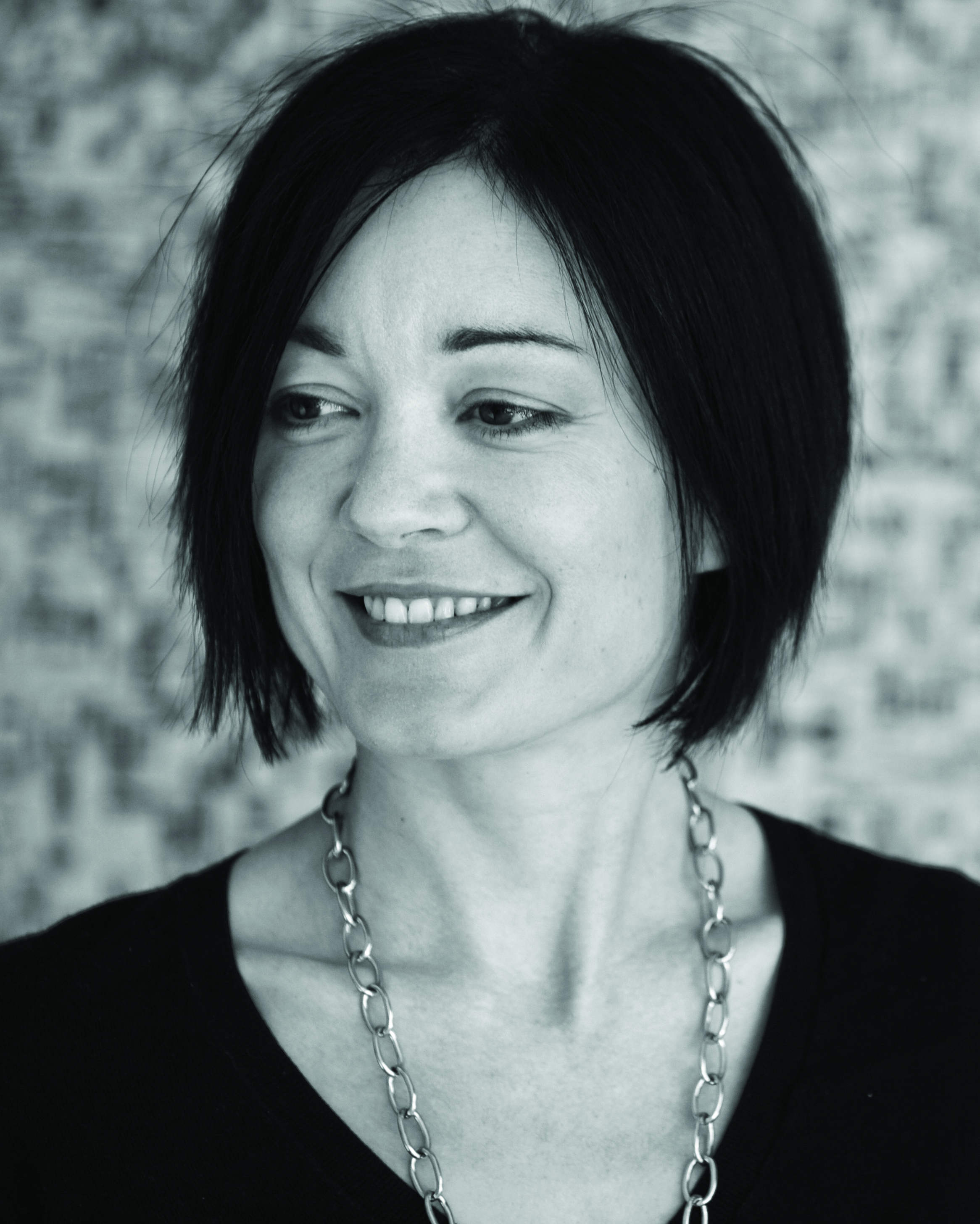
- Gardner in 2008

Chair of the Canadian Anti-Hate Network
- Incumbent
- Assumed office 14 September 2023
- Preceded by: Bernie Farber

2nd Executive Director of the Wikimedia Foundation
- In office 2007–2014
- Preceded by: Brad Patrick
- Succeeded by: Lila Tretikov

Personal details
- Born: May 11, 1967 (age 59) Barbados
- Education: Ryerson Polytechnical Institute
- Website: Official website

Sue Gardner (born May 11, 1967) is a Canadian journalist, not-for-profit executive and business executive. She was the executive director of the Wikimedia Foundation from December 2007 until May 2014, and before that was the director of the Canadian Broadcasting Corporation's website and online news outlets.

In 2012, Gardner was ranked as the 70th-most powerful woman in the world by Forbes magazine. In 2013, she joined the board of Global Voices. In May 2015, the Tor Project announced that Gardner would be assisting with the development of their long-term organizational strategy. In 2018, she was announced as executive director of The Markup. Gardner left this position in May 2019.

In November 2023, Gardner was appointed chair of the Canadian Anti-Hate Network.

== Early life ==
Gardner was born in Barbados. She grew up in Port Hope, Ontario, Canada, the daughter of an Anglican priest and a school principal. She received a degree in journalism from Ryerson Polytechnical Institute.

== Career ==
=== Journalism ===
Gardner began her career on Canadian Broadcasting Corporation (CBC) radio in 1990 on the program As It Happens, and worked for more than a decade as a producer, reporter and documentary maker for CBC Radio current affairs and for Newsworld International, focusing on pop culture and social issues.

In March 2006, she succeeded Claude Galipeau as senior director of the CBC website and Internet platform, CBC.ca, building its staff from 35 to 160.

=== Wikimedia ===
In May 2007, Gardner resigned from CBC, and soon began consulting for the Wikimedia Foundation as a special advisor on operations and governance. In December 2007, she was hired as the foundation's executive director. Over the next two years, she oversaw growth of the staff, adding a fundraising team, and a move of the headquarters from St. Petersburg, Florida, to San Francisco, California. In October 2009, Gardner was named by The Huffington Post as one of ten "media game changers of the year" for the impact on new media of her work for Wikimedia.

One of the issues that Gardner addressed while she was a Wikimedia Foundation executive director was gender bias on Wikipedia. She listed nine reasons why women don't edit Wikipedia, culled from comments by female Wikipedia editors:

1. A lack of user-friendliness in the editing interface
2. Not having enough free time
3. A lack of self-confidence
4. Aversion to conflict and an unwillingness to participate in lengthy edit wars
5. Belief that their contributions are too likely to be reverted or deleted
6. Some find its overall atmosphere misogynistic
7. Wikipedia culture is sexual in ways they find off-putting
8. Being addressed as male is off-putting to women whose primary language has grammatical gender
9. Fewer opportunities than other sites for social relationships and a welcoming tone

On March 27, 2013, Gardner announced she would be leaving the Wikimedia Foundation. She stated that the Wikimedia Foundation was doing well but the Internet was not, and she planned to help in that area going forward. Gardner identified the "turning point" for her decision to move on as her involvement in the 2012 Wikipedia blackout protesting the Stop Online Piracy Act and the Protect Intellectual Property Act, protests that "started me thinking about the shape the Internet was taking and what role I could play in that."

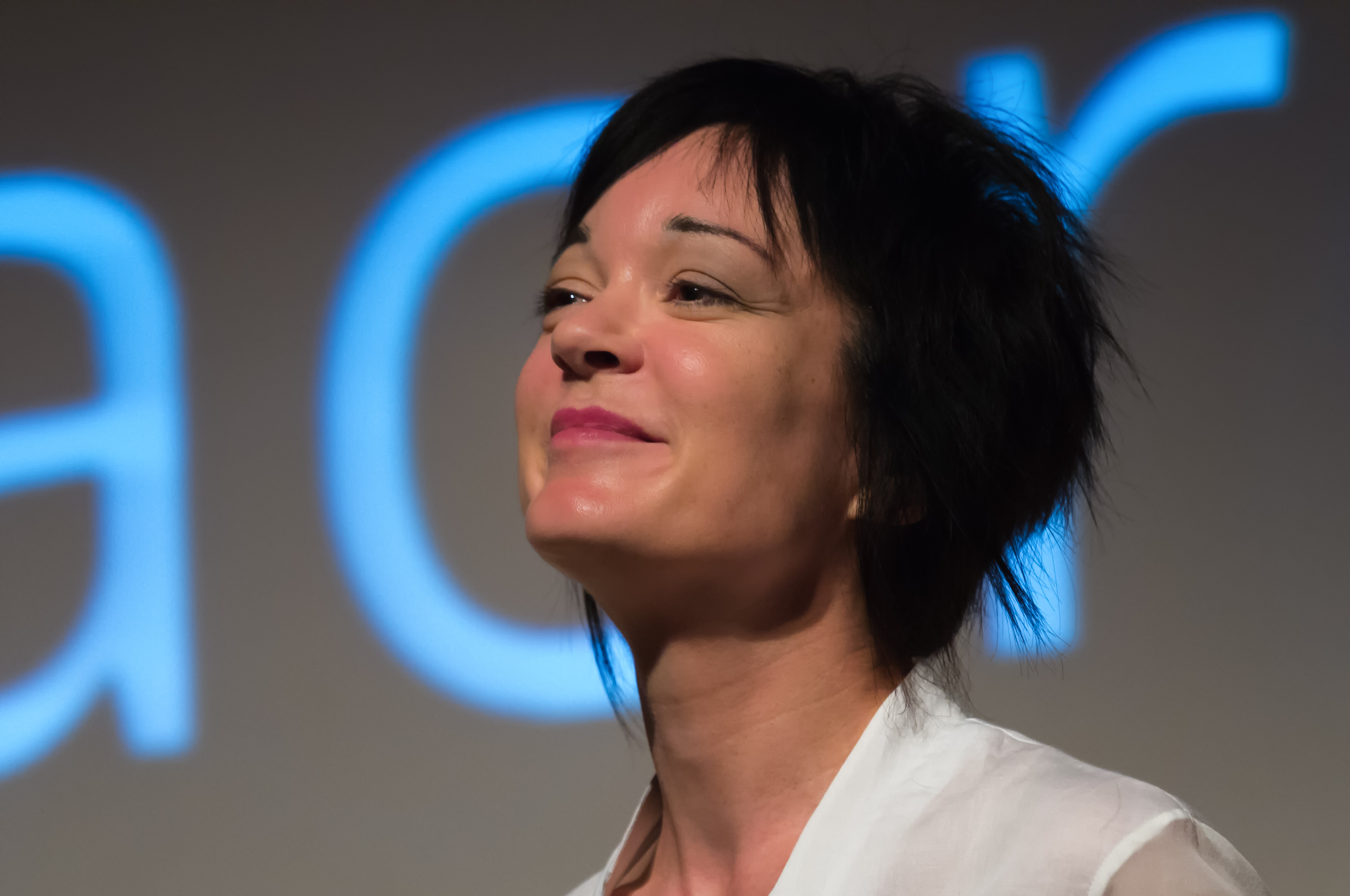
Gardner in 2013 at Wikimania

In 2013, Gardner received an honorary doctorate from Ryerson University, her alma mater.

It was announced on May 1, 2014, that Lila Tretikov would be replacing Gardner, and would take over as executive director of the Wikimedia Foundation on June 1, 2014.

=== Tor and First Look ===
Gardner joined The Tor Project, Inc to develop a strategic plan, with support from First Look Media. The Tor Project is a Massachusetts-based research-education nonprofit organization founded by computer scientists Roger Dingledine, Nick Mathewson and five others. The Tor Project is primarily responsible for maintaining software for the Tor anonymity network. First Look Media is an American news organization founded by Pierre Omidyar that was launched in October 2013 as a venue for "original, independent journalism." The organization is incorporated as a tax-exempt charitable entity.

=== The Markup ===
In September 2018, Gardner co-founded The Markup with Julia Angwin and Jeff Larson as a continuation of their work at ProPublica. With $20 million of initial funding from Craig Newmark, the site would work to cover news about "Big Tech" and its impact on the public. Initially, Gardner was set to serve as executive director, Angwin as editor-in-chief, and Larson as managing editor, with a launch date of early 2019.

In April 2019, Gardner fired Angwin over creative and managerial differences. Larson was named editor-in-chief. Five of seven journalists on the staff resigned. In a letter to Newmark, Angwin said Gardner wanted to turn The Markup into a "cause" rather than a "publication." Angwin also said Gardner ranked reporters in job interviews according to how negatively they viewed tech companies and suggested using headlines like "Facebook is a dumpster fire." Gardner responded that The Markup's mission had not changed. Gardner and Larson left The Markup the following month, and Angwin was reinstated as the website's editor-in-chief in August 2019.

== See also ==
- List of Wikipedia people
