= Chief Executive Officer of the Wikimedia Foundation =

Logo

The chief executive officer is the top-level executive position at the Wikimedia Foundation. Formerly, this position was known as the executive director of the Wikimedia Foundation.

== Executive directors of the Wikimedia Foundation ==
Executive Directors of the Wikimedia Foundation
| No. | Image | Name | Term start | Term end | Ref |
|---|---|---|---|---|---|
| – | | Brad Patrick (interim) | June 2006 | January 2007 | |
| 1 | | Sue Gardner | December 2007 | May 2014 | |
| 2 | | Lila Tretikov | June 2014 | March 2016 | |
| 3 | | Katherine Maher | March 2016 | 29 January 2019 | |

== Chief executive officers of the Wikimedia Foundation ==
Chief Executive Officers of the Wikimedia Foundation
| No. | Image | Name | Term start | Term end | Ref |
|---|---|---|---|---|---|
| 1 | | Katherine Maher | 30 January 2019 | April 2021 | |
| 2 | | Maryana Iskander | 5 January 2022 | 20 January 2026 | |
| 3 | | Bernadette Meehan | 20 January 2026 | Present | |
