= Declaration of Internet Freedom =

The Declaration of Internet Freedom is a 2012 online declaration in defence of online freedoms signed by a number of prominent organisations and individuals. Notable signatories include Amnesty International, the Electronic Frontier Foundation, Reporters Without Borders, and the Mozilla Foundation, among others.

The declaration supports the establishment of five basic principles for Internet policy:

- Non-censorship of the Internet
- Universal access to fast and affordable networks
- Freedom to connect, communicate, create and innovate over the Internet.
- Protection for new technologies and innovators whose innovations are abused by users.
- Privacy rights and the ability for Internet users to control information about them is used.

The declaration started to be translated through a collaborative effort started by Global Voices in August 2012 and at the end of the first week of August, it had been made available into 70 languages, almost half of which were provided by Project Lingua volunteer translators. In 2018, the website began to be reduced and by 2020 was seemingly erased and is no longer accessible (see data on archive.org).
