= Maryana Iskander =

American social entrepreneur (born 1975)

- ماريانا إسكندر
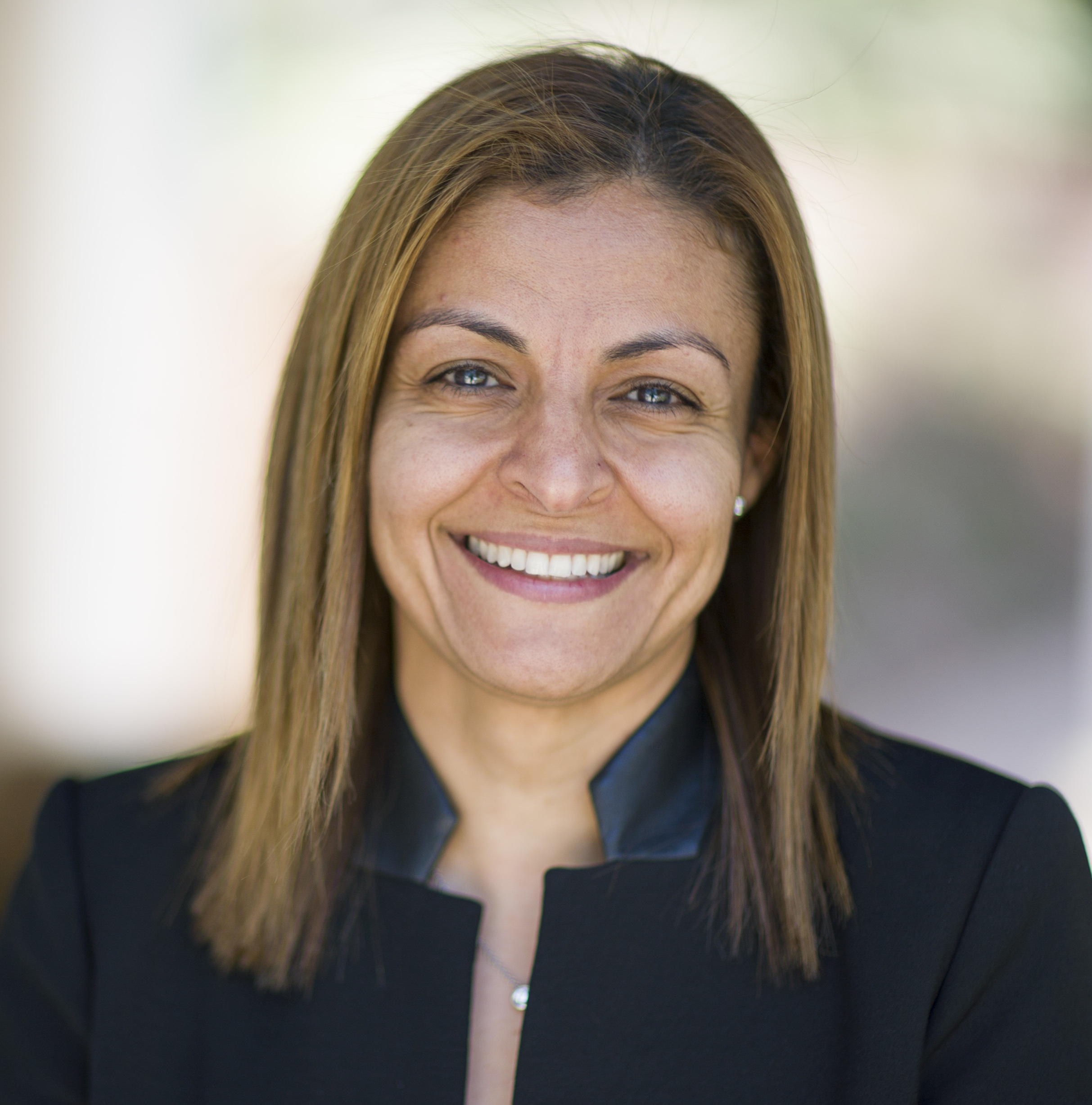
- Iskander in 2017
- Born: September 1, 1975 (age 51); Cairo, Egypt
- Citizenship: United States
- Education: Rice University (BA); Trinity College, Oxford (MSc); Yale University (JD)
- Occupations: Social entrepreneur; lawyer
- Awards: Rhodes Scholarship (1996); Skoll Award (2019)

Chief Executive Officer of the Wikimedia Foundation
- In office January 5, 2022 – January 20, 2026
- Preceded by: Katherine Maher
- Succeeded by: Bernadette Meehan
- Maryana introducing herself Recorded October 2021

Maryana Iskander (Note: /ˌmæriˈænə ɪˈskændər/ MARR-ee-AN-ə isk-AN-dər; Arabic: ماريانا إسكندر;) (born September 1, 1975) is an Egyptian-American social entrepreneur and lawyer. In 2022, she became the chief executive of the Wikimedia Foundation, succeeding Katherine Maher. Iskander left the role in 2026, being succeeded by Bernadette Meehan. Prior to her position, Iskander was the CEO of the Harambee Youth Employment Accelerator and a former chief operating officer of the Planned Parenthood Federation of America in New York City.

== Early life and education ==
Maryana Iskander was born in Cairo, Egypt, where she lived before emigrating to the United States with her family at the age of four. Her family settled in Round Rock, Texas. Iskander matriculated at Rice University on a Harry S. Truman Scholarship, graduating with a B.A., magna cum laude, in sociology in 1997. In 1999, Iskander obtained her MSc from Trinity College, Oxford, as a Rhodes Scholar, where she founded the Rhodes Association of Women. Afterward, she enrolled at Yale Law School, graduating with a J.D. in 2003.

== Career ==
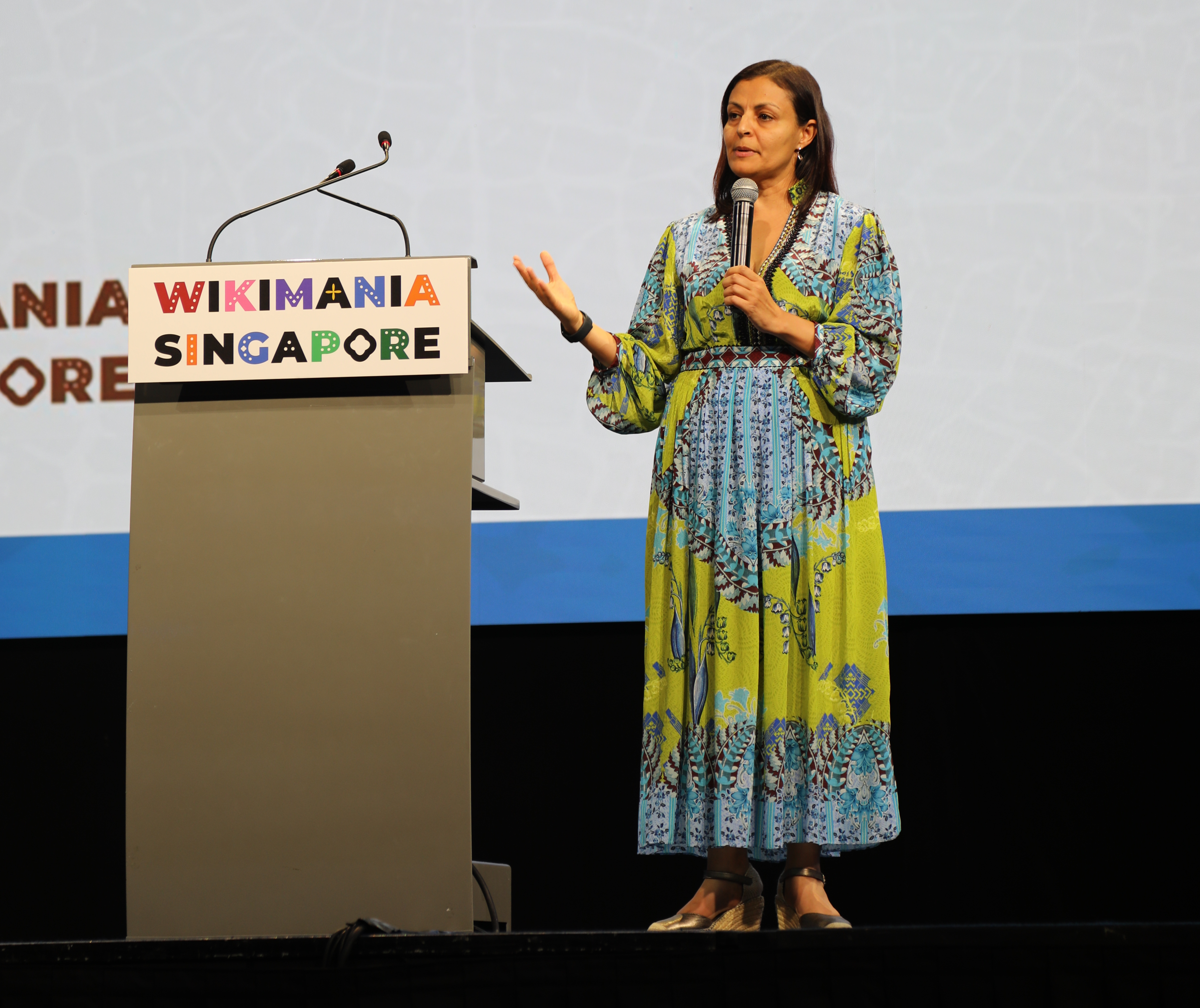
Iskander during Wikimania 2023

After graduating from Oxford University, Iskander began her career as an associate at McKinsey and Co. Following her graduation from Yale Law School, Iskander clerked for Diane P. Wood on the Seventh Circuit Court of Appeals in Chicago, Illinois. She then served as the adviser to the president of Rice University, David Leebron. After two years, Iskander left her job at Rice to take the role of chief operating officer for Planned Parenthood Federation of America in New York. She has also worked as a strategy consultant for W. L. Gore & Associates, and a law clerk at Cravath, Swaine & Moore in New York, and Vinson & Elkins in Houston.

After her time at Planned Parenthood, in 2012, Iskander became the chief operating officer of Harambee Youth Employment Accelerator in South Africa before becoming its chief executive officer (CEO) a year later (2013). Harambee is focused on connecting employers to first-time workers to reduce youth unemployment and increase retention. Speaking at the 2019 Conscious Companies Awards in Johannesburg, Iskander explained that she wanted "business to understand that the hiring of young people in their first jobs is not a charitable exercise but talent ... We treat young people like customers and not like beneficiaries."

On September 14, 2021, Iskander was named as CEO of the Wikimedia Foundation, assuming her post on January 5, 2022. She has stated in interviews that her priorities after taking her role were to diversify Wikipedia's volunteer writers and editors and to promote the Wikimedia Foundation's mission of advocating for access to information. In May 2025, she announced to staff that she would step down from the role as part of an organized succession plan, seeking a new CEO by January 2026. Iskander was compensated $512,179 in 2023 and $472,629 in 2024 for her role as CEO.

In 2023, Iskander was elected to the Yale Board of Trustees. On October 17, 2025, during WikiConference North America at Civic Hall at Union Square in Manhattan, Iskander's speech to around 100 persons in the audience was interrupted when a man stormed to the stage, brandished a loaded firearm, and threatened suicide. The gunman was restrained and disarmed by two trust and safety volunteers at the conference. According to Bill Adair, Iskander was grateful to the two trust and safety volunteers, and told the crowd, "Richard and Andrew have been very busy... I thank them for saving my life."

== Recognition ==
Iskander has been the recipient of several awards and fellowships including the Skoll Award for Social Entrepreneurship and the Yale Law School Distinguished Alumnae Award. In 2002, she was awarded the Paul and Daisy Soros Fellowship for New Americans, which is given to immigrants or the children of immigrants "who are poised to make significant contributions to US society, culture or their academic field". She was awarded a Rhodes Scholarship, and also received the Harry S. Truman Scholarship. She was a member of the 2006 class of Henry Crown Fellows at the Aspen Institute and of their Aspen Global Leadership Network. In April 2026, she received the Ann Richards Legacy Award.

== See also ==
- List of Wikipedia people
