= Lila Tretikov =

Russian-American engineer and Wikimedian (born 1978)

- Ляля Третьякова
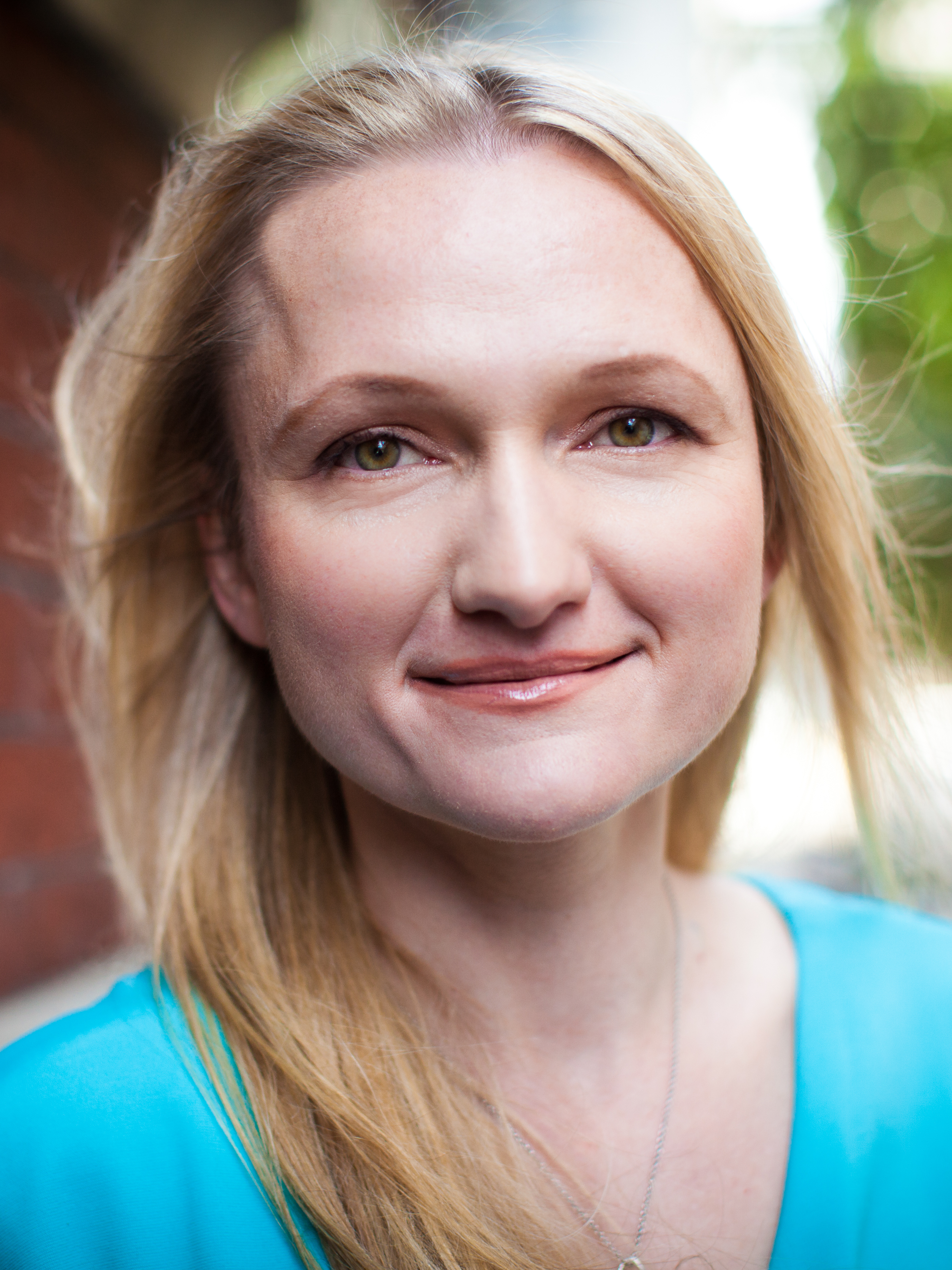
- Tretikov in 2014

3rd Executive Director of the Wikimedia Foundation
- In office June 1, 2014 – March 31, 2016
- Preceded by: Sue Gardner
- Succeeded by: Katherine Maher

Personal details
- Born: Olga Tretyakova; January 25, 1978 (age 48) Moscow, RSFSR, Soviet Union
- Education: University of California, Berkeley (dropped out)
- Occupation: Serving on the Board of Directors of UBS
- Tretikov's voice recorded September 2014

Lila Tretikov (/ˈlaɪlə ˈtrɛtɪkɒf/) (born Olga (Lyalya) (Note: "Lyalya" is a Russian-language diminutive from the first name "Olga".) Tretyakova, Russian: Ольга (Ляля) Третьяко́ва, January 25, 1978) is a Russian-American engineer and manager.

== Early life and education ==
Tretikov was born in Moscow, Soviet Union. Her father is a mathematician, and her mother was a filmmaker. After moving to New York City at age 15, she learned English while waitressing and attended the University of California, Berkeley, but left before completing her degree. Her majors were computer science and art, and she researched machine learning.

Tretikov introduced to WMF employees

== Career ==
In 1999, Tretikov began working as a software engineer in California, where she co-authored several software patents and was a specialist in enterprise software. Tretikov started her professional career at Sun Microsystems as an engineer at the Sun-Netscape Alliance, where she worked on the Java server. She then founded GrokDigital, a technology marketing company, and was later appointed chief information officer and vice president of engineering at SugarCRM Inc.

In 2012, Tretikov was a Stevie Awards bronze winner in the category for "Female Executive of the Year‍—‌Business Services‍—‌11 to 2,500 Employees‍—‌Computer Hardware & Software". She has co-authored several patents in intelligent data mapping and dynamic language applications. Tretikov was appointed executive director of the Wikimedia Foundation in May 2014 in succession to Sue Gardner, and took up the post on June 1, 2014. She had edited Wikipedia only once before her appointment. Tretikov resigned from the Wikimedia Foundation as a result of the WMF's controversial Knowledge Engine project and disagreements with the staff, with her last day being March 31, 2016.

Tretikov was succeeded by Katherine Maher in March 2016. On March 16, 2016, it was announced that Tretikov had been invited by the World Economic Forum to join its Young Global Leaders community. Tretikov is on the boards of OpenEd, as well as Rackspace, and also joined the board of directors of Volvo Cars in March 2021. She joined Microsoft Corporation in 2018 and was Corporate Vice President & Deputy Chief Technology Officer. In March 2024, she moved on to be Partner, Head of AI Strategy, at New Enterprise Associates, a venture capital company. She also joined the Board of Directors of Xylem Inc. In 2025, she joined the board of UBS.

== See also ==
- List of Wikipedia people
