= Cucumis (website) =

Cucumis is a website where translators share their linguistic knowledge and exchange services online. One unusual feature of Cucumis is that all translations are peer reviewed and may be edited by other Cucumis translators. This provides for high-quality translations, and often achieves a target text that is both faithful in meaning to the source text and fully idiomatic in the target language.

== History ==
Founded in 2005, by July 2007 Cucumis had over 50,000 members and was receiving 100 requests per day for translations between dozens of languages. The first user interface was in English, but in an ongoing process of localization others were added. By the end of 2007, there were user interfaces in 31 languages, in 8 writing systems. Most of the work involved was volunteered by members.

== Members ==
Cucumis members are located in dozens of countries, with the two largest contingents in Turkey and Brazil; together, these two countries account for 1/3 of all members. Why these two countries are over-represented is unknown. Although English is the single most popular target language, only a small minority of members (about 2%) are in primarily English-speaking countries.

== How it works ==
To submit a text for translation, users become members by choosing a username and giving a valid e-mail address. All new members are given enough points to "pay" for translation of a short paragraph. Returning members who lack points are given more points. Members earn points by translating texts submitted by others. All members may translate texts and edit translations by others. For quality control, all translations are rated by administrators and experts. All members are eligible for promotion to "Expert" for a given language after completing many translations into that language rated with an average quality of over 7/10.

== See also ==
- BigTranslation
- Flitto
