= Sidney Breese =

American judge (1800–1878)

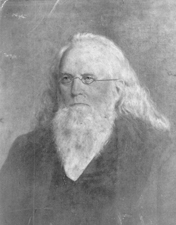

Chief Justice of the Illinois Supreme Court
- In office 1873–1874
- Preceded by: Charles B. Lawrence
- Succeeded by: Pinkney H. Walker
- In office 1867–1870
- Preceded by: Pinkney H. Walker
- Succeeded by: Charles B. Lawrence

15th Speaker of the Illinois House of Representatives
- In office January 6, 1851 – January 3, 1853
- Preceded by: Zadok Casey
- Succeeded by: John Reynolds

United States Senator from Illinois
- In office March 4, 1843 – March 3, 1849
- Preceded by: Richard M. Young
- Succeeded by: James Shields

Justice of the Illinois Supreme Court
- In office 1857–1878
- Preceded by: Walter B. Scates
- Succeeded by: David J. Baker Jr.
- In office 1841–1843
- Succeeded by: James Semple

Personal details
- Born: July 15, 1800 Whitesboro, New York, US
- Died: June 27, 1878 (aged 77) Pinckneyville, Illinois, US
- Resting place: Carlyle, Illinois
- Party: Democratic
- Spouse: Eliza Morrison
- Education: Hamilton College; Union College
- Occupation: lawyer, jurist, author

Military service
- Allegiance: United States
- Branch/service: Illinois Militia
- Rank: Lt. Colonel
- Battles/wars: Blackhawk War

Sidney Breese (July 15, 1800 – June 27, 1878), was an American lawyer, soldier, author and jurist. Born in New York, became an early Illinois pioneer and represented the state in the United States Senate as well as served as Chief Justice of the Illinois Supreme Court and Speaker of the Illinois House of Representatives, and has been called "father of the Illinois Central Railroad".

== Early and family life ==
Breese was born in 1800 in Whitesboro, New York, the second son of Arthur Breese (1770–1825) and his first wife, Catherine Livingston (1775–1808). His maternal grandfather was Henry Beekman Livingston and a member of the Livingston family. His elder brother became U.S. Navy commodore Samuel Livingston Breese, and he also had elder sisters Sarah Breese Lansing (1795–1879) and Elizabeth Breese Sands (1796–1890) as well as a half-sister, Sarah Ann Breese Walker (1811–1882). Painter and telegraph inventor Samuel Finley Breese Morse was a cousin.

=== Education ===
Breese's mother died when Sidney was eight, and although his father remarried, Rev. Jesse Townsend helped raise Breese. During this time, Sidney befriended his distant (and slightly elder) cousin Elias Kent Kane, also a member of the Schuyler family of New York. Under Townsend's guidance Breese entered Hamilton College at just 14 years old, then transferred to Union College in 1816. In 1818, he graduated third in his class of 64 and was a member of the New York Alpha of the Phi Beta Kappa. In Illinois, as discussed below, Breese also read law under Kane in 1820.

=== Family ===
In 1823, Sidney Breese married Eliza Morrison (1808–1895), daughter of wealthy merchant William Morrison. They owned slaves and had fourteen children, including daughters Eloise Philips McClurken (1824–1885) and Elizabeth Breese (1841–1845), and sons William Arthur Breese (1826–1838), Charles Broadhead Breese (1828–1844), (Samuel) Livingston Breese (1831–1899; who served in the U.S. Navy during the Civil War, attaining the rank of Commander by war's end), Daniel L. Breese (1832-after 1860, who was a Lieutenant in the U.S. Army in 1860), Sidney Samuel Breese(1835–1891), Edward Livingston Breese (1837–1838), William Morrison Breese (1838-after 1860, when he was a land agent and living at home), James Buchanan Breese (1846–1887, who would serve as a Second Lieutenant in the Marine Guard during the Civil War), Elias Dennis Breese (1848–1851) and Alexander Breese (1850–1851).

== Illinois pioneer ==
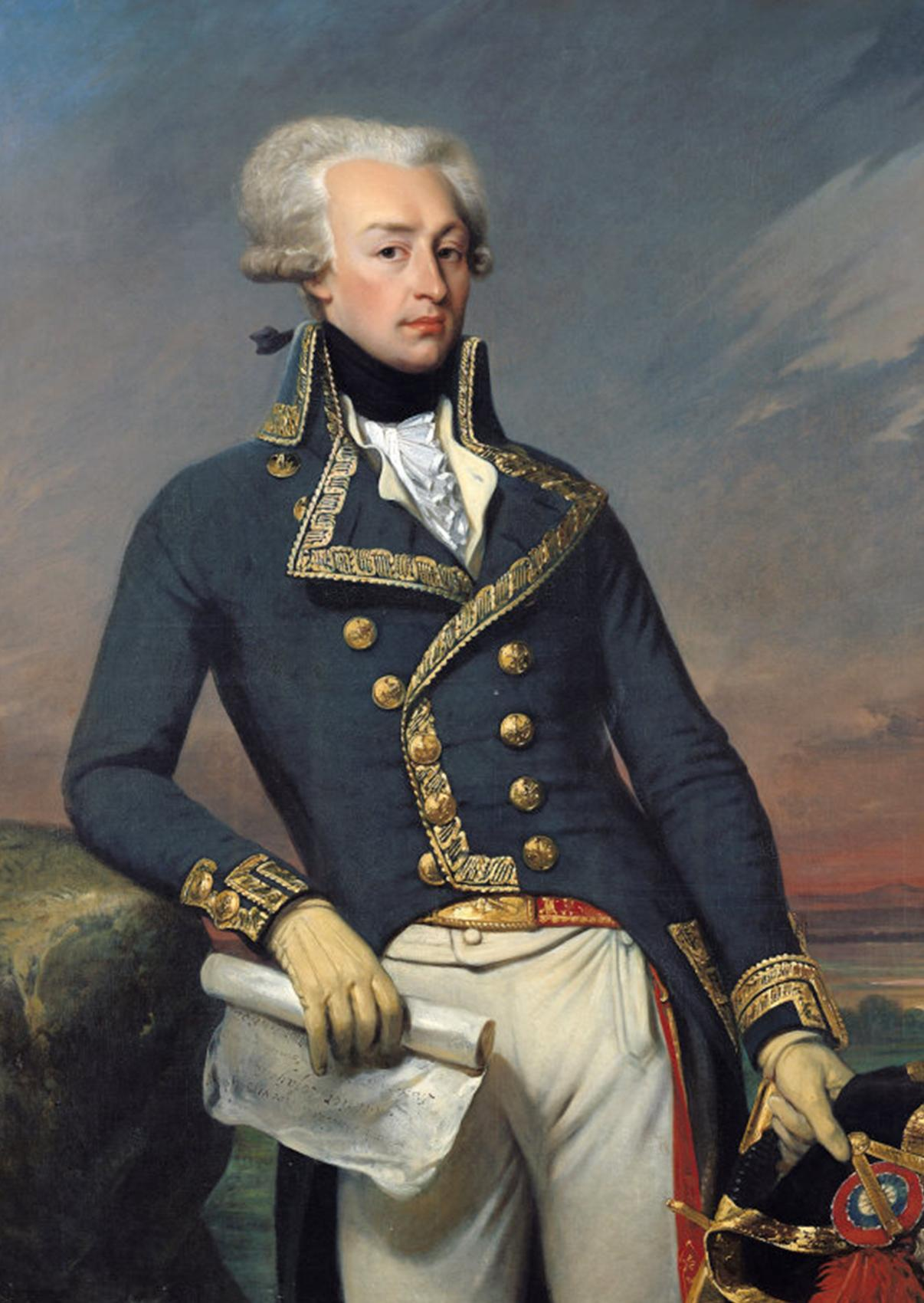
Breese partied with Marquis de La Fayette in Kaskaskia, Illinois at Colonel Sweet's Tavern on April 30, 1825.

Kane had moved to Illinois following his graduation from Yale College in 1814, and suggested Breese join him after his graduation. Breese accepted, and would become a pioneer of Illinois.

=== Assistant Secretary of State ===
Illinois became a state in 1818 and after Kane had become Illinois Secretary of State, he appointed Breese his assistant (as well as continued to oversee his legal studies). Breese also was admitted to the Illinois bar in 1821.

In 1820, Illinois's capital was moved from the flood-prone Kaskaskia in Randolph County, Illinois, on the Mississippi River to Vandalia, on the National Road. Breese was responsible for moving the State Department's records, which he did by wagon. He remained Asst. Secretary of State until the end of the legislative session in 1821, when he returned to Kaskaskia and began a private law practice.

=== Postmaster of Kaskaskia ===
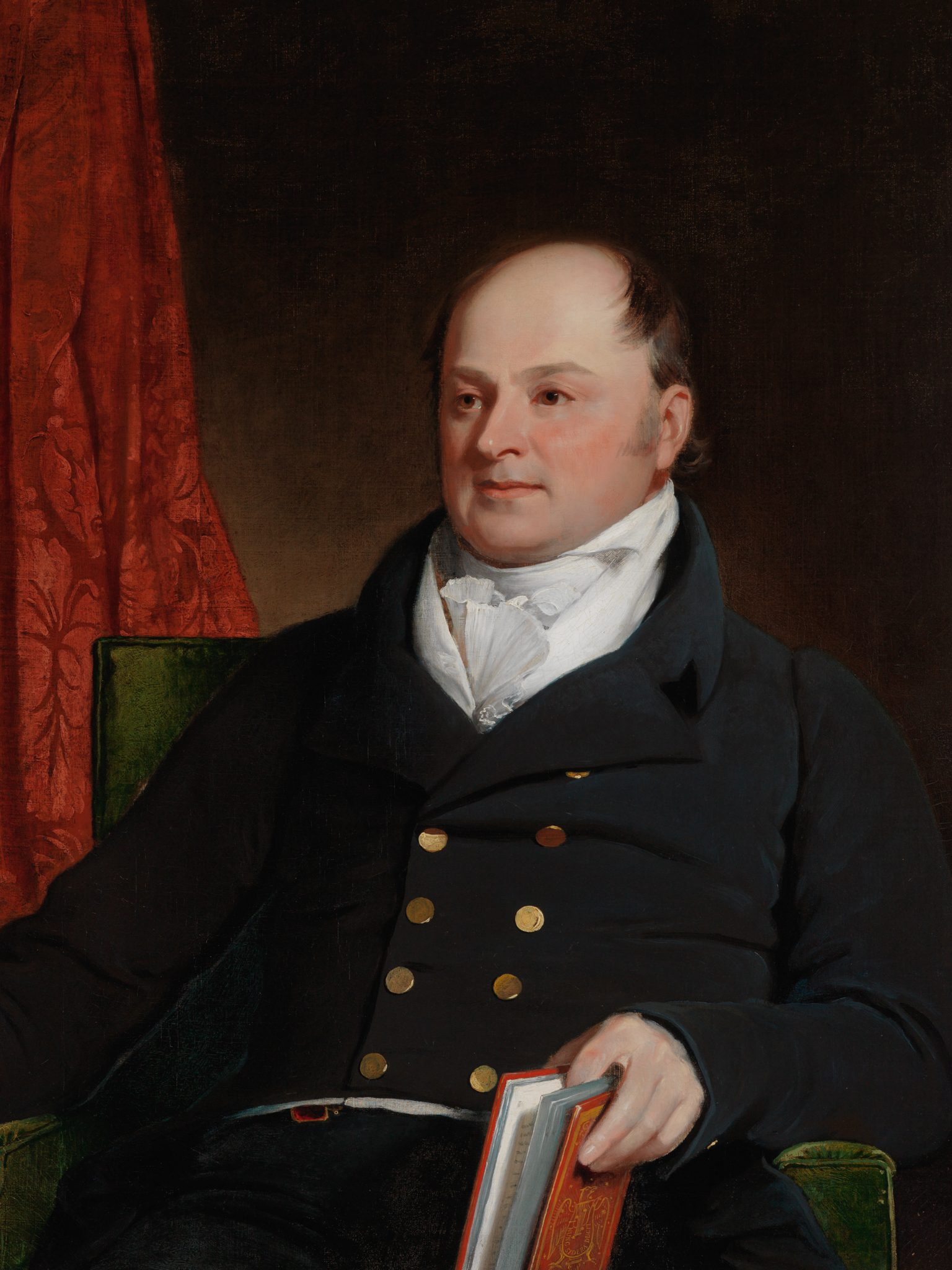
U.S. President John Quincy Adams appointed Breese as a United States Attorney at just 27 years old.

By chance in 1821, he was approached in his law office one day by the Post-Office Department to assume the duties of Postmaster for Kaskaskia. Breese accepted and thereafter earned commissions on postage stamp sales.

=== Prosecutor ===
In 1822, Breese was appointed as the Circuit-Attorney for the Third Judicial District in Illinois. He served in that capacity until 1826, when he was removed by the new Governor, Ninian Edwards. In 1827, U.S. President John Quincy Adams, a Whig appointed Breese United States Attorney for the State of Illinois. He remained in that capacity until newly inaugurated Democrat Andrew Jackson replaced him in 1829.

=== "Breese Reports" ===
Having removed to private practice following his dismissal in 1829, in 1831 Breese also began compiling the reports of the Illinois Supreme Court. These were the first books published in Illinois, and were known as the "Breese Reports". Also during this time under the pseudonym R. K. Fleming he edited the Western Democrat.

In 1831 he ran for the US congress on a platform favoring transfer of all public lands to each state.

== Black Hawk War ==
Following the outbreak of the Black Hawk War in 1832, Breese volunteered for military service, enlisting as a private. He was thereafter elected a Major. The battalion assembled at Beardstown, Cass County, Illinois, and marched to the Illinois River near Peru. After arriving at Camp Wilborn, the Lieutenant-Colonel Theophilus W. Smith (a Judge on the Illinois Supreme Court) resigned, and Breese was elected to fill the open position. Under his command were future Civil War General Robert Anderson and future U.S. President Zachary Taylor.

== Further legal career ==
Following the war, he returned to private practice. In 1833, he was the lead counsel in the defense of Illinois Supreme Court Justice Theophilus W. Smith, whom he had replaced in military command earlier, during his impeachment trial by the Illinois House of Representatives. The defense team also included future-Illinois Governor Thomas Ford and future-U.S. Senator Richard M. Young. Judge Smith remained in office as the legislature failed to achieve a 2/3ds vote required for conviction. Breese also platted an addition to the new town of Chicago, and helped early settler and trader Jean Baptiste Beaubien with his land claim which included the soon-decommissioned Fort Dearborn, which succeeded with the Illinois Supreme Court but was reversed by the United States Supreme Court, despite the efforts of appellate counsel Francis Scott Key and Daniel Webster in Wilcox v. Jackson (1837).

=== State judge ===
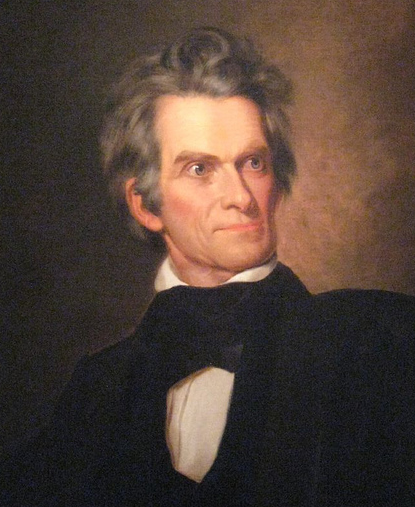
Breese opposed John C. Calhoun over tactics during Mexican–American War in the U.S. Senate.

Following the establishment of the circuit courts in Illinois in 1835, the legislature appointed Breese a judge, responsible for the 2nd Circuit. A case filed in his court in 1838 concerned whether the Governor (then Whig Joseph Duncan) could remove a Secretary of State (Democrat Alexander Pope Field) and appoint another. In a heated partisan atmosphere, Breese delivered a purely legal opinion which upheld the Governor's power. The opinion was appealed to the supreme court, where his opinion was overturned. In retaliation, during the aftermath of the Panic of 1837, Democrats in the state legislature increased the number of judges on the court from four to nine (although the number would again be reduced following the adoption of a new state constitution in 1848), and Breese received one of the new positions.

=== Justice of the Illinois Supreme Court ===
In 1841, following the contested legal dispute, Breese assumed the duties as a Justice in the Illinois Supreme Court on February 22. Among the five new appointees to the court made by the legislature, along with Breese, was future-U.S. Senator Stephen A. Douglas. Of the 131 opinions rendered by the court during his tenure, Sidney delivered 34 of them.

== U.S. Senate ==
In December 1842, Breese was elected as a U.S. Senator from Illinois as a Democrat. During his term he was considered a poor politician by insiders because he devoted his time and energy to the official duties of his office and people of Illinois versus the financiers and special interests of the Democratic Party and Washington establishment. Rumors circulated about his possible candidacy for the U.S. Presidency, but Breese was more interested in working for his state. He was an associate of future-President Abraham Lincoln during this time, as Lincoln served in the Illinois delegation of U.S. House of Representatives.

Breese had several accomplishments as a Senator, including serving as Chairman of the Public Lands Committee and as a member of the District of Columbia Committee. He was offered the more prestigious position as Chairman of the Judiciary Committee, but turned it down for the Public Lands Committee, which was crucial for the state in which he advocated for a transcontinental railroad, eventually securing the Illinois Central Railroad for his state. He also served as regent of the Smithsonian Institution during the Polk administration.

=== Texas Annexation ===
One of his first speeches was in favor of Texas Annexation, and Breese introduced supporting legislation in 1845, which ultimately occurred later that year. Sidney supported the Mexican–American War which followed, delivering one of the most famous speeches in Senate history concerning of war tactics and opposing Senator John C. Calhoun.

=== Oregon Treaty ===
Breese was a Democrat expansionist who was vehemently opposed the Oregon Treaty of 1846 with Great Britain, insisting that Britain remain isolated from the Pacific Coast and calling for the current boundaries of Oregon Country to be extended to the 54th parallel, bordering Russian Alaska. The treaty was ultimately signed, in which Sidney proclaimed his country had been unjustly stolen by the British.

=== Tariff Act of 1846 ===
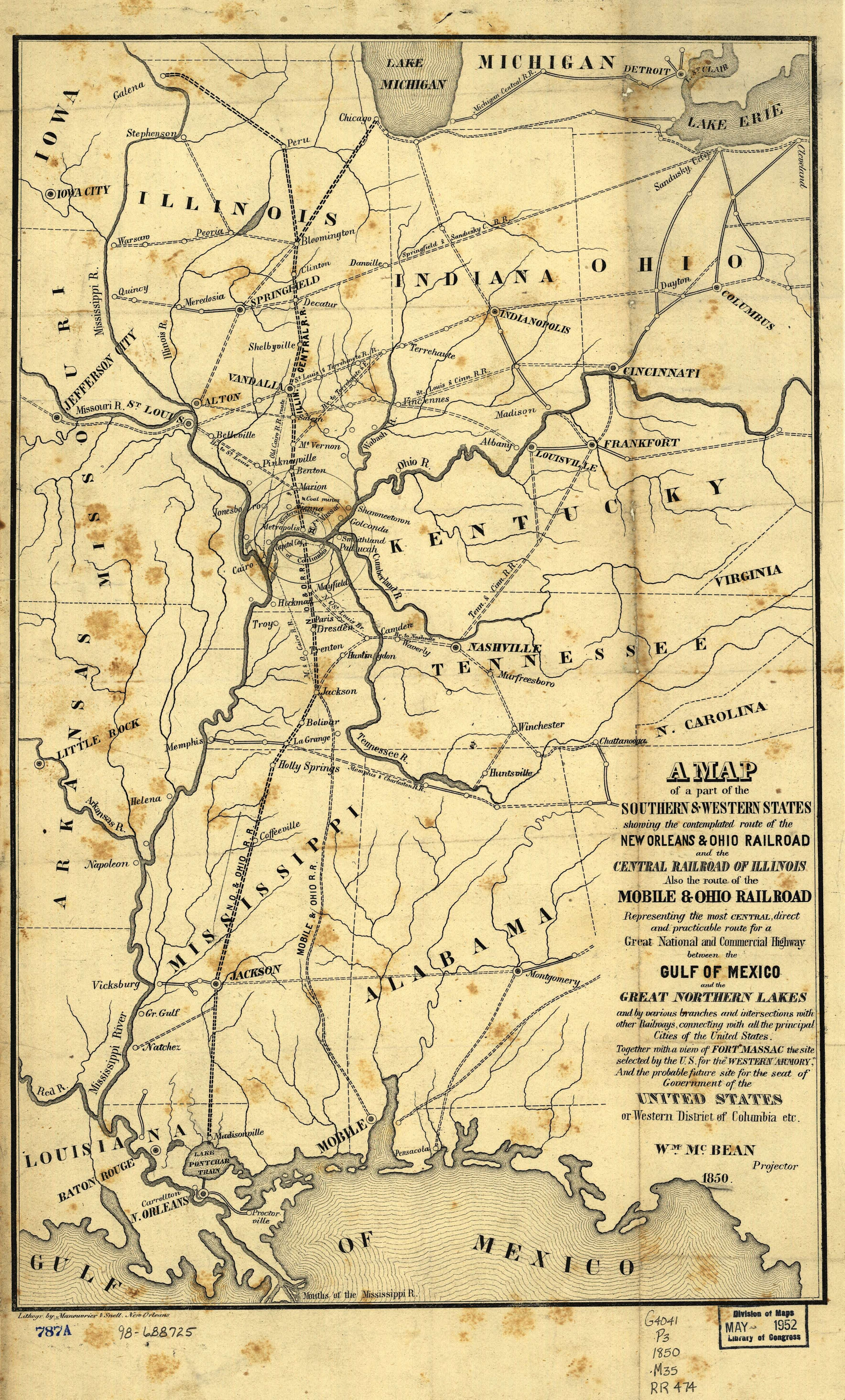
Map of the Illinois Central Railroad from 1850, which Breese is considered the father of

He cast the deciding the vote in favor of the Tariff Act of 1846.

=== Failure to be renominated ===
In 1849, he ultimately failed to secure his party's renomination. However, bittersweetly, a project he had long advocated and pushed for while in Washington, the Illinois Central Railroad, was approved as he left office.

=== Illinois Central Railroad ===
Starting in 1835, Breese began lobbying for a railroad connecting the Illinois and Michigan Canal with the lower Mississippi River and ultimately the Pacific Ocean. Upon arriving in Washington, one of his first acts was to introduce legislation, which was passed in 1844, providing for the examination of the possibility of a naval depot and shipyard at the confluence of the Ohio and Mississippi Rivers, This would encourage the government to authorize land for the railroad by having a governmental interest in connecting the depot with the Great Lakes. In 1846, Breese offered another bill requesting the government grant Illinois land to construct the road, which as the Chairman of the Public Lands Committee, Breese made the first full report ever made to Congress on the subject. In the report, Breese urged the importance of the railroad, which would connect the country coast-to-coast in four days, China and the American Atlantic cities in 30 days, China-to-Great Britain in 45 days, and the world with America in 30 days.

Sidney offered two more extensive reports in 1848, including constitutional analysis of Senator Douglas's bill in support of the railroad. The railroad bills were consolidated with a bill from Senator King, passed, and signed by President Millard Fillmore in 1850, shortly after Sidney left office. In 1851, the Illinois Central Railroad Company was charted by the State of Illinois, and received the land grants from the federal government.

For his efforts, Breese is remembered as the "father of the Illinois Central Railroad".

== Speaker of the Illinois House of Representatives ==
In 1850, Breese was elected to the Illinois House of Representatives, where he was immediately elevated to the position of speaker. He served a term there, leaving in 1852.

== Return to private practice ==
Breese left the assembly in 1852 and returned to private legal practice, as well as served as a director of the Ohio and Mississippi Railroad Company. His name was offered as a nomination for Governor of Illinois at numerous conventions, while talk continued of his possible candidacy for the U.S. Presidency, including in 1868, when some thought he could have won for the Democrats.

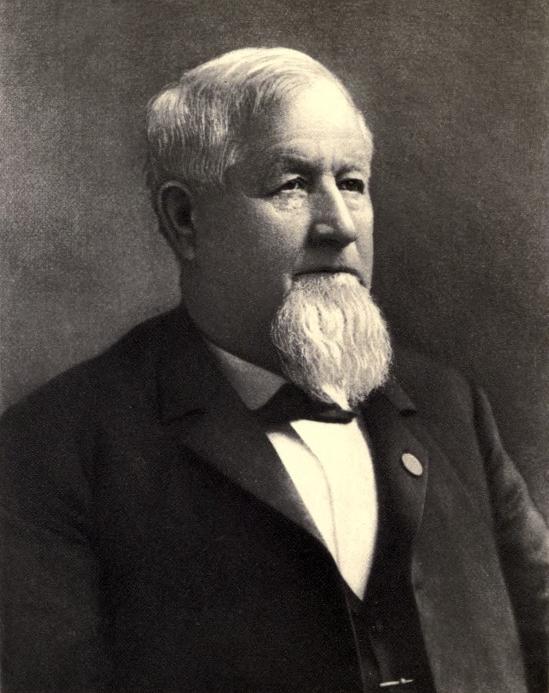
John M. Palmer called Breese an "ideal judge".

== Illinois judicial service ==
Breese rejected a nomination to the Illinois Supreme Court in 1853, and many speculated he wanted to return to the U.S. Senate. However, legislators forced him back into judicial service. Breese accepted an appointment as a Judge on the Circuit Court in 1855, before being elected to the Illinois Supreme Court as an associate justice in 1857. He would serve the rest of years on the bench of that court, including stints as the Chief Justice during multiple terms. By 1850, Breese was living in Carlyle, Illinois, the county seat of Clinton County, Illinois, and relatively centrally located within the state.

=== Civil War ===
During the 1860 U.S. Presidential election, Breese was by then an elder statesmen of the Democratic Party. As the American Civil War loomed, Breese was a Peace Democrat who was strongly pro-states' rights, but opposed secession. Two of his sons served in the Union Army and Navy. As the war raged on, in 1863, Breese proposed radical amendments to the Constitution for the inevitable reconstruction process that would follow the war, one which promised non-interference with slavery. The amendments also included a complete overhaul of the federal election system, including how the President was elected, and enumerating a new power for the Senate to be the court of last resort for states' rights issues or for the constitutionality of a law to be decided. The amendments were presented to the pro-peace Chicago Times for publication, but the editor deemed them too radical.

=== Author ===
The transcontinental railroad that Breese had advocated as a Senator was completed. In 1869, Breese published a volume on Illinois history, and another Origin and History of the Pacific Railroad.

== Death and legacy ==
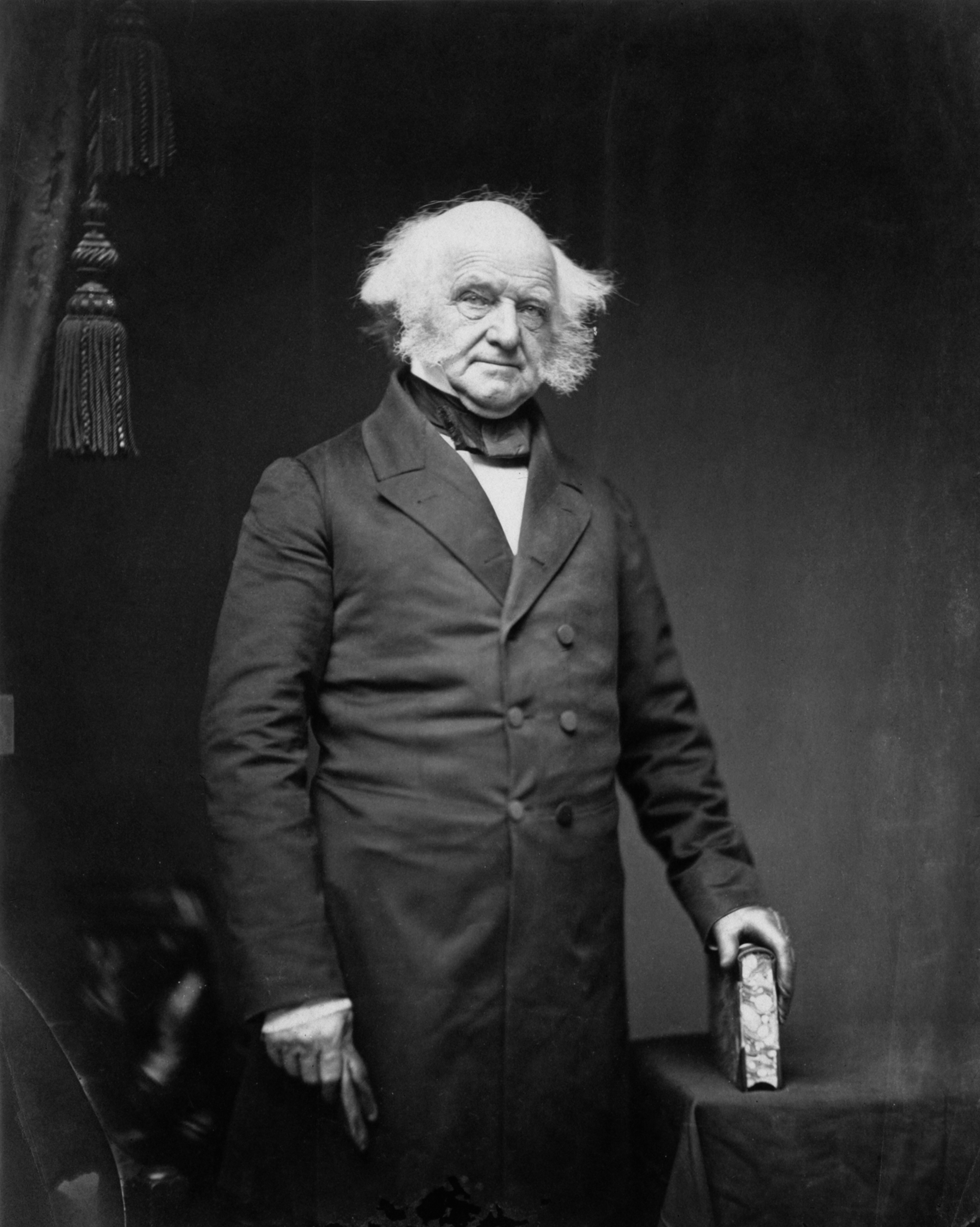
Breese personally corresponded with U.S. President Martin Van Buren during his lifetime.

Breese died in Pinckneyville, Illinois, on June 27, 1878.

A philanthropist who gave his earnings to every church denomination and many worthy causes, Breese accumulated little personal wealth. He was later also remembered for inflexible justice which prevented corruption from ever reaching the court he sat on. Breese encouraged young people studying law, and was noted as being a man who has "a tear for pity, and a hand open as day to melting charity". The Illinois State Historical Society has "The Sidney Breese Papers", which consist of the letters and papers belonging to Breese, including personal letters from U.S. Senator Stephen A. Douglas, U.S. President Martin Van Buren, Lincoln's Secretary of War Simon Cameron, Illinois Governor John Reynolds, U.S. Ambassador to Spain Gustav Körner, and U.S. Secretary of State Lewis Cass, among many others.

The town of Breese, Illinois, is named in his honor.

U.S. Senate
| Preceded by Richard M. Young | U.S. senator (Class 3) from Illinois; 1843–1849; Served alongside: Samuel McRoberts, James Semple, Stephen A. Douglas | Succeeded by James Shields |
