= List of ambassadors of the United States to Colombia =

Ambassador of the United States to Colombia
- Embajador de los Estados Unidos en Colombia
- Seal of the United States Department of State

- Flag of a United States ambassador

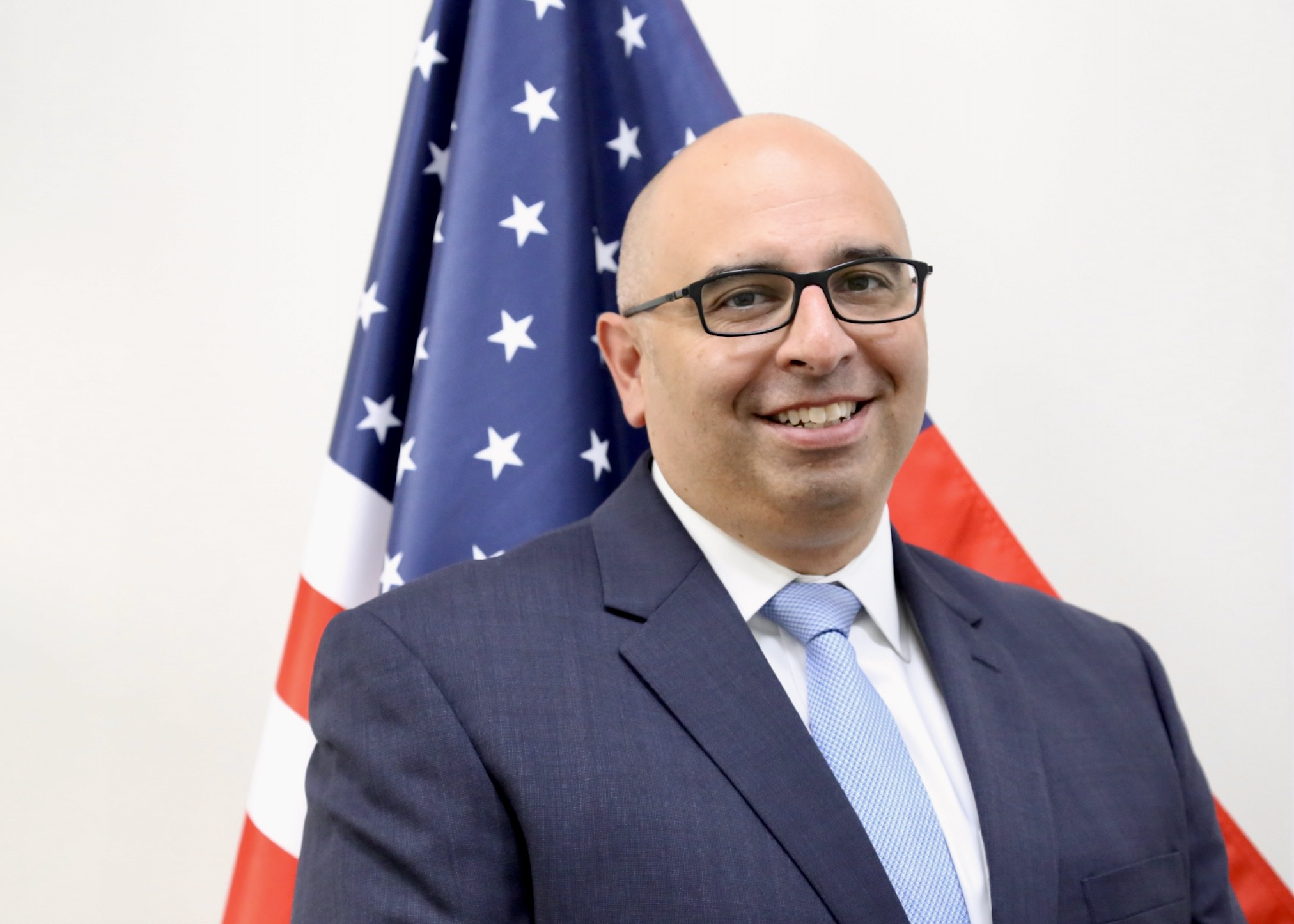
- Incumbent; Hugo Guevara; Chargé d'affaires since June 30, 2026
- Nominator: The president of the United States
- Appointer: The president with Senate advice and consent
- Inaugural holder: Richard Clough Anderson, Jr. as Minister Plenipotentiary
- Formation: December 16, 1823
- Website: U.S. Embassy - Bogotá

The following is a list of ambassadors of the United States, or other chiefs of mission, to Colombia and its predecessor states. The title given by the United States State Department to this position is currently Ambassador Extraordinary and Minister Plenipotentiary.

== Gran Colombia ==
The following were commissioned either Chargés d'Affaires or Ministers to Gran Colombia.

| Representative | Title | Presentation of credentials | Termination of mission | Appointed by |
|---|---|---|---|---|
| Richard Clough Anderson, Jr. | Minister Plenipotentiary | December 16, 1823 | July 24, 1826 | James Monroe |
| Beaufort T. Watts | Chargé d'Affaires | March 3, 1827 | November 21, 1827 | John Quincy Adams |
| William Henry Harrison | Envoy Extraordinary and Minister Plenipotentiary | February 5, 1829 | September 26, 1829 | John Quincy Adams |
| Thomas P. Moore | Envoy Extraordinary and Minister Plenipotentiary | September 26, 1829 | April 16, 1833 | Andrew Jackson |

== New Granada ==
The following were commissioned as either Chargés d'Affaires or Ministers to New Granada.

| Representative | Title | Presentation of credentials | Termination of mission | Appointed by |
|---|---|---|---|---|
| Robert B. McAfee | Chargé d'Affaires | July 1, 1833 | June 20, 1837 | Andrew Jackson |
| James Semple | Chargé d'Affaires | April 21, 1838 | March 4, 1842 | Martin Van Buren |
| William M. Blackford | Chargé d'Affaires | September 17, 1842 | December 24, 1844 | John Tyler |
| Benjamin A. Bidlack | Chargé d'Affaires | December 5, 1845 | February 6, 1849 | James K. Polk |
| Thomas M. Foote | Chargé d'Affaires | January 5, 1850 | October 15, 1850 | Zachary Taylor |
| Yelverton P. King | Chargé d'Affaires | August 25, 1851 | April 5, 1853 | Millard Fillmore |
| James S. Green | Chargé d'Affaires | December 19, 1853 | August 13, 1854 | Franklin Pierce |
| James B. Bowlin | Minister Resident | April 10, 1855 | May 20, 1857 | Franklin Pierce |
| George Wallace Jones | Minister Resident | August 29, 1859 | November 4, 1861 | James Buchanan |

== United States of Colombia ==
The following were commissioned as Ministers to the United States of Colombia.

| Representative | Title | Presentation of credentials | Termination of mission | Appointed by |
|---|---|---|---|---|
| Allan W. Burton | Minister Resident | March 9, 1864 | December 10, 1866 | Abraham Lincoln |
| Peter J. Sullivan | Minister Resident | July 25, 1867 | June 26, 1869 | Andrew Johnson |
| Stephen A. Hurlbut | Minister Resident | November 13, 1869 | April 3, 1872 | Ulysses S. Grant |
| William L. Scruggs | Minister Resident | July 24, 1873 | October 26, 1876 | Ulysses S. Grant |
| Ernest J. Dichman | Minister Resident | October 4, 1878 | September 21, 1881 | Rutherford B. Hayes |
| George Maney | Minister Resident | September 21, 1881 | July 19, 1882 | Chester A. Arthur |
| William L. Scruggs | Minister Resident | July 19, 1882 | December 4, 1884 | Chester A. Arthur |
| William L. Scruggs | Envoy Extraordinary and Minister Plenipotentiary | December 4, 1884 | December 15, 1885 | Chester A. Arthur |
| Charles D. Jacob | Envoy Extraordinary and Minister Plenipotentiary | January 26, 1886 | May 29, 1886 | Grover Cleveland |

== Republic of Colombia ==
The following were commissioned as either Ministers or Ambassadors to the Republic of Colombia.

| Representative | Title | Presentation of credentials | Termination of mission | Appointed by |
|---|---|---|---|---|
| Dabney H. Maury | Envoy Extraordinary and Minister Plenipotentiary | January 20, 1887 | June 22, 1889 | Grover Cleveland |
| John T. Abbott | Envoy Extraordinary and Minister Plenipotentiary | June 22, 1889 | July 17, 1893 | Benjamin Harrison |
| Luther F. McKinney | Envoy Extraordinary and Minister Plenipotentiary | July 17, 1893 | December 6, 1896 | Grover Cleveland |
| Charles Burdett Hart | Envoy Extraordinary and Minister Plenipotentiary | July 19, 1897 | March 19, 1903 | William McKinley |
| Arthur M. Beaupre | Envoy Extraordinary and Minister Plenipotentiary | April 13, 1903 | December 19, 1903 | Theodore Roosevelt |
| William W. Russell | Envoy Extraordinary and Minister Plenipotentiary | December 9, 1904 | May 24, 1905 | Theodore Roosevelt |
| John Barrett | Envoy Extraordinary and Minister Plenipotentiary | November 27, 1905 | September 24, 1906 | Theodore Roosevelt |
| Thomas C. Dawson | Envoy Extraordinary and Minister Plenipotentiary | October 16, 1907 | April 25, 1909 | Theodore Roosevelt |
| Elliott Northcott | Envoy Extraordinary and Minister Plenipotentiary | August 13, 1909 | September 16, 1910 | William Howard Taft |
| James T. DuBois | Envoy Extraordinary and Minister Plenipotentiary | November 18, 1911 | March 1, 1913 | William Howard Taft |
| Thaddeus Austin Thomson | Envoy Extraordinary and Minister Plenipotentiary | August 30, 1913 | June 26, 1916 | Woodrow Wilson |
| Hoffman Philip | Envoy Extraordinary and Minister Plenipotentiary | February 22, 1919 | May 29, 1922 | Woodrow Wilson |
| Samuel H. Piles | Envoy Extraordinary and Minister Plenipotentiary | May 29, 1922 | September 17, 1928 | Warren G. Harding |
| Jefferson Caffery | Envoy Extraordinary and Minister Plenipotentiary | November 28, 1928 | May 20, 1933 | Calvin Coolidge |
| Edwin Sheldon Whitehouse | Envoy Extraordinary and Minister Plenipotentiary | December 6, 1933 | December 8, 1934 | Franklin D. Roosevelt |
| William Dawson | Envoy Extraordinary and Minister Plenipotentiary | May 6, 1935 | November 16, 1937 | Franklin D. Roosevelt |
| Spruille Braden | Ambassador Extraordinary and Plenipotentiary | February 15, 1939 | March 12, 1942 | Franklin D. Roosevelt |
| Arthur Bliss Lane | Ambassador Extraordinary and Plenipotentiary | April 30, 1942 | October 18, 1944 | Franklin D. Roosevelt |
| John Cooper Wiley | Ambassador Extraordinary and Plenipotentiary | December 16, 1944 | May 3, 1947 | Franklin D. Roosevelt |
| Willard L. Beaulac | Ambassador Extraordinary and Plenipotentiary | September 30, 1947 | June 29, 1951 | Harry S. Truman |
| Capus M. Waynick | Ambassador Extraordinary and Plenipotentiary | August 23, 1951 | September 21, 1953 | Harry S. Truman |
| Rudolf E. Schoenfeld | Ambassador Extraordinary and Plenipotentiary | January 28, 1954 | January 26, 1955 | Dwight D. Eisenhower |
| Philip Bonsal | Ambassador Extraordinary and Plenipotentiary | April 1, 1955 | April 24, 1957 | Dwight D. Eisenhower |
| John Moors Cabot | Ambassador Extraordinary and Plenipotentiary | July 12, 1957 | July 15, 1959 | Dwight D. Eisenhower |
| Dempster McIntosh | Ambassador Extraordinary and Plenipotentiary | July 30, 1959 | January 6, 1961 | Dwight D. Eisenhower |
| Fulton Freeman | Ambassador Extraordinary and Plenipotentiary | June 15, 1961 | March 14, 1964 | John F. Kennedy |
| Covey T. Oliver | Ambassador Extraordinary and Plenipotentiary | August 13, 1964 | August 29, 1966 | Lyndon B. Johnson |
| Reynold E. Carlson | Ambassador Extraordinary and Plenipotentiary | October 6, 1966 | June 2, 1969 | Lyndon B. Johnson |
| Jack H. Vaughn | Ambassador Extraordinary and Plenipotentiary | June 9, 1969 | June 25, 1970 | Richard Nixon |
| Leonard J. Saccio | Ambassador Extraordinary and Plenipotentiary | February 24, 1971 | July 12, 1973 | Richard Nixon |
| Viron P. Vaky | Ambassador Extraordinary and Plenipotentiary | April 5, 1974 | June 23, 1976 | Richard Nixon |
| Phillip V. Sanchez | Ambassador Extraordinary and Plenipotentiary | September 2, 1976 | April 5, 1977 | Gerald Ford |
| Diego C. Asencio | Ambassador Extraordinary and Plenipotentiary | December 6, 1977 | June 22, 1980 | Jimmy Carter |
| Thomas D. Boyatt | Ambassador Extraordinary and Plenipotentiary | December 3, 1980 | April 14, 1983 | Jimmy Carter |
| Lewis Arthur Tambs | Ambassador Extraordinary and Plenipotentiary | May 2, 1983 | February 15, 1985 | Ronald Reagan |
| Charles A. Gillespie Jr. | Ambassador Extraordinary and Plenipotentiary | August 28, 1985 | September 19, 1988 | Ronald Reagan |
| Thomas E. McNamara | Ambassador Extraordinary and Plenipotentiary | October 4, 1988 | August 14, 1991 | Ronald Reagan |
| Morris D. Busby | Ambassador Extraordinary and Plenipotentiary | September 18, 1991 | July 5, 1994 | George H. W. Bush |
| Myles Frechette | Ambassador Extraordinary and Plenipotentiary | July 25, 1994 | November 8, 1997 | Bill Clinton |
| Curtis Warren Kamman | Ambassador Extraordinary and Plenipotentiary | March 19, 1998 | August 15, 2000 | Bill Clinton |
| Anne W. Patterson | Ambassador Extraordinary and Plenipotentiary | August 24, 2000 | June 11, 2003 | Bill Clinton |
| William B. Wood | Ambassador Extraordinary and Plenipotentiary | August 13, 2003 | March 12, 2007 | George W. Bush |
| William R. Brownfield | Ambassador Extraordinary and Plenipotentiary | September 12, 2007 | August 3, 2010 | George W. Bush |
| Michael McKinley | Ambassador Extraordinary and Plenipotentiary | September 14, 2010 | September 1, 2013 | Barack Obama |
| Kevin Whitaker | Ambassador Extraordinary and Plenipotentiary | May 20, 2014 | August 17, 2019 | Barack Obama |
| Philip S. Goldberg | Ambassador Extraordinary and Plenipotentiary | September 19, 2019 | June 1, 2022 | Donald Trump |
| Francisco Palmieri | Chargé d'Affaires | June 1, 2022 | January 20, 2025 | Joe Biden |
| Brendan O'Brien | Chargé d'Affaires | January 20, 2025 | February 1, 2025 | Donald Trump |
| John McNamara | Chargé d'Affaires | February 1, 2025 | February 13, 2026 | Donald Trump |
| Jarahn Hillsman | Chargé d'Affaires | February 13, 2026 | June 30, 2026 | Donald Trump |
| Hugo Guevara | Chargé d'Affaires | June 30, 2026 | Present | Donald Trump |

== See also ==
- Colombia – United States relations
- Foreign relations of Colombia
- Ambassadors of the United States
