= Waynick =

Waynick is an English surname. Notable people with the surname include:

- Capus M. Waynick (1889–1986), American newspaperman, politician, and diplomat
- Catherine Waynick (1948–2025), American Anglican bishop of Indianapolis
