= Willard L. Beaulac =

American diplomat (1899–1990)

- Willard Leon Beaulac in Bogota Colombia c. 1949

United States Ambassador to Paraguay
- In office 1944–1947
- President: Franklin D. Roosevelt
- Preceded by: Wesley Frost
- Succeeded by: Fletcher Warren

United States Ambassador to Colombia
- In office 1947–1951
- President: Harry S. Truman
- Preceded by: John C. Wiley
- Succeeded by: Capus M. Waynick

United States Ambassador to Cuba
- In office 1951–1953
- President: Harry S. Truman
- Preceded by: Robert Butler
- Succeeded by: Arthur Gardner

United States Ambassador to Chile
- In office 1953–1956
- President: Dwight D. Eisenhower
- Preceded by: Claude G. Bowers
- Succeeded by: Cecil B. Lyon

33rd United States Ambassador to Argentina
- In office June 1, 1956 – August 2, 1960
- President: Dwight D. Eisenhower
- Preceded by: Albert F. Nufer
- Succeeded by: Roy Richard Rubottom, Jr.

Personal details
- Born: Willard Leon Beaulac; July 25, 1899 Pawtucket, Rhode Island, U.S.
- Died: August 25, 1990 (aged 91) Washington, D.C., U.S.
- Resting place: Rock Creek Cemetery
- Spouse: Catherine Hazel Arrott Greene (m. 1935)
- Children: 4
- Education: Brown University (1918); Georgetown University (1921)
- Occupation: Diplomat

Willard Leon Beaulac (July 25, 1899 – August 25, 1990) was an American diplomat. He served as U.S. Ambassador to Paraguay, Colombia, Cuba, Chile and Argentina.

== Early life ==
Willard Leon Beaulac was born on July 25, 1899, in Pawtucket, Rhode Island, to Sylvester Clinton Beaulac and Lena Eleanor Jarvis. He attended Brown University before joining the United States Navy in 1918. After his honorable discharge in 1919, he attended the School of Foreign Service at Georgetown University and graduated in 1921.

== Career ==
Beaulac joined the United States Foreign Service in 1921 as a vice consul. In 1939, he was an advisor to the U.S. delegation to the 2nd American International Labor Organization. In 1940, he was counselor to the U.S. Embassy in Cuba and had a similar role in Spain in 1941. He received his first ambassadorial appointment to Paraguay in 1944. In 1947 he was named United States Ambassador to Colombia.

From 1951 to 1953 he was United States Ambassador to Cuba. In 1953 he succeeded Claude G. Bowers as United States Ambassador to Chile. From 1956 to 1960 he was United States Ambassador to Argentina. Before retiring in the early 1960s, he was the deputy commandant for foreign affairs of the National War College. From 1967 to 1969, he was a visiting professor at Southern Illinois University. He was a visiting professor of political science at Ball State University from 1970 to 1971.

== Personal life ==
Beaulac married Catherine Hazel Arrott Greene on February 25, 1935. They had three daughters and one son, Noel, Joan, Nancy Ann and Willard Leon Jr.

Beaulac died from Alzheimer's disease at his home in Washington, D.C., on August 25, 1990, aged 91. He was buried in Rock Creek Cemetery.

== Positions ==
- US Ambassador to Argentina (1956–60)
- US Ambassador to Chile (1953–56)
- US Ambassador to Cuba (1951–53)
- US Ambassador to Colombia (1947–51)
- US Ambassador to Paraguay (1944–47)
- US State Department Consul General, Madrid (1941–44)
- US State Department Counsellor, Havana (1940–41)
- US State Department Assistant Chief, Division of American Republics (1937–40)
- US State Department Assistant Chief, Division of Latin American Affairs (1934–37)
- US State Department Second Secretary, San Salvador, El Salvador (1933)
- US State Department Second Secretary, Managua, Nicaragua (1928–33)
- US State Department Third Secretary, Port-au-Prince, Haiti (1927–28)
- US State Department Consul, Arica, Chile (1925–27)
- US State Department Vice Consul, Puerto Castilla, Honduras (1923–25)
- US State Department Vice Consul, Tampico, Mexico (1921–23)

== Professor ==
- Southern Illinois University
- Ball State University

== Works ==
- Career Ambassador, Macmillan, 1951, (memoir)
- Career Diplomat: A Career in the Foreign Service of the United States (1966)
- A Diplomat Looks at Aid to Latin America, Southern Illinois University Press, 1970
- The Fractured Continent: Latin American in Close Up
- Franco: Silent Ally in World War II, Southern Illinois University Press, 1986, ISBN 9780809312542

Diplomatic posts
Preceded by Wesley Frost	United States Ambassador to Paraguay; 1944–1947	Succeeded by Fletcher Warren
Preceded by John C. Wiley	United States Ambassador to Colombia; 1947–1951	Succeeded by Capus M. Waynick
Preceded by Robert Butler	United States Ambassador to Cuba; 1951–1953	Succeeded by Arthur Gardner
Preceded by Claude G. Bowers	United States Ambassador to Chile; 1953–1956	Succeeded by Cecil B. Lyon
Preceded by Albert F. Nufer	United States Ambassador to Argentina; 1956–1960	Succeeded by Roy Richard Rubottom, Jr.
