= William Worthington Russell =

United States Marine Corps officer

William W. Russell
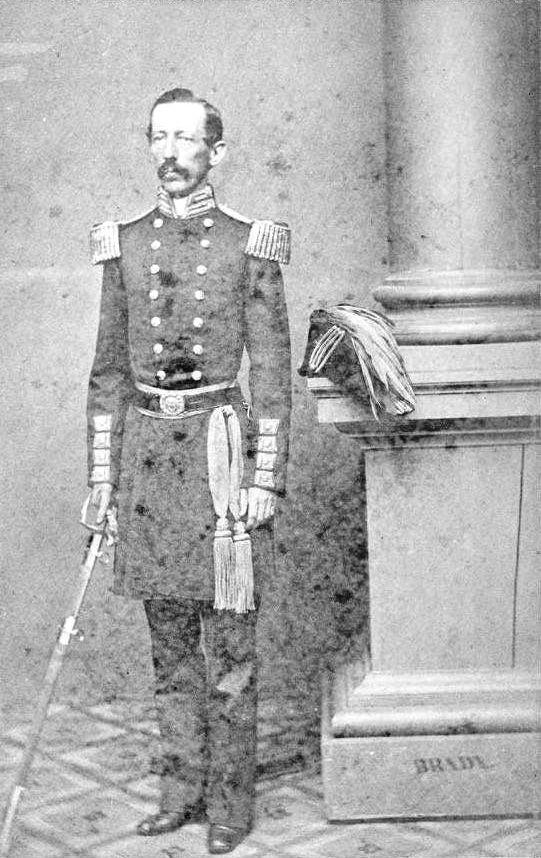
- Born: William Worthington Russell; September 20, 1821
- Died: October 31, 1862 (aged 41)
- Allegiance: United States
- Branch: United States Marine Corps
- Service years: 1843–1862
- Rank: Major
- Conflicts: Mexican–American War; John Brown's raid on Harpers Ferry; American Civil War

William Worthington Russell (September 20, 1821 – October 31, 1862) was a United States Marine Corps officer who served as the paymaster of the Marine Corps during the mid-19th century.

== Early life ==
Russell was born on September 20, 1821. He was the son of Robert Grier Russell and Susan Hood (née Worthington) Russell. Among his siblings were Admiral Alexander Wilson Russell and Rear Admiral John Henry Russell.

His paternal grandfather was lawyer and Revolutionary War soldier Alexander Russell, and among his extended family were uncle James McPherson Russell, a U.S. Representative from Pennsylvania, and first cousin, U.S. Representative Samuel Lyon Russell. Through his brother John, he was uncle to Maj.-Gen. John H. Russell Jr. (father of Brooke Astor).

== Career ==
Russell served as Paymaster of the Marines for two decades. While serving under the command of General Winfield Scott in the Mexican–American War, he was aboard the ship USS Independence when Captain William Shubrick ordered Russell to lead a counter-attack against Mexican forces.

=== Civil War ===
At the beginning of the American Civil War, Russell served as aide-de-camp for General George B. McClellan. He participated in the U.S. government's response to John Brown's raid on Harpers Ferry, alongside Robert E. Lee, J. E. B. Stuart, and Israel Greene, and captured John Brown's pike in the process. Of the four officers who led the government's response to Brown's raid, only Russell remained loyal to the United States, with the rest defecting to the Confederate States Army. Alcoholism led to his resignation, and untimely death, in 1862.

== Personal life ==
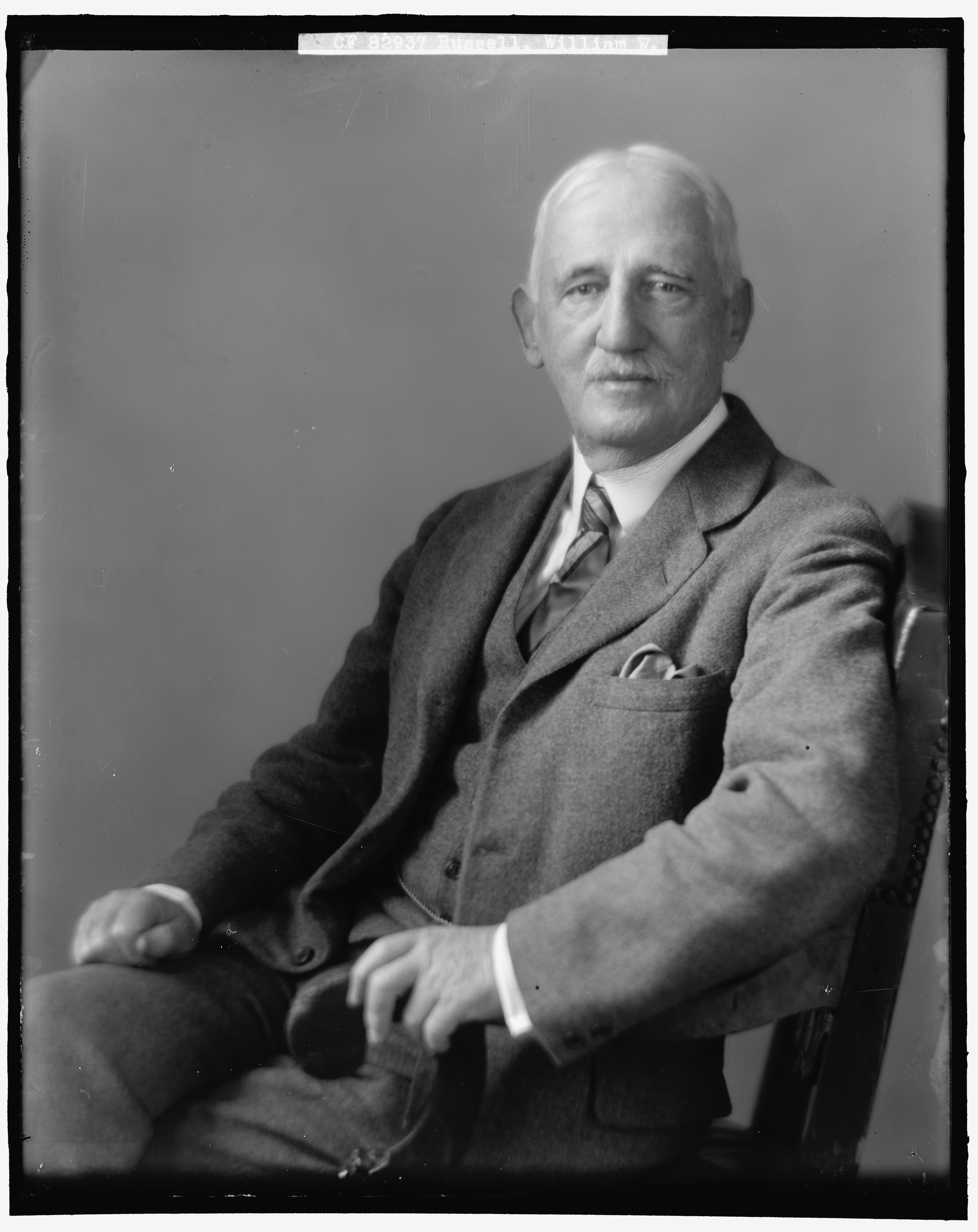
Photograph of his son, William W. Russell, 1905

Russell was married to Virginia Fletcher of Alexandria, Virginia. Together, they were the parents of two daughters and a son, including:

- Virginia Fletcher Russell (1854–1943), who married John Buchanan Brewer.
- William Worthington Russell Jr. (1858–1944), a U.S. diplomat who served under five presidents; he married Grace Campbell Lidstone in 1905.
- Lucy Briscoe Russell (1860–1943), who died unmarried.

Russell died from alcoholism on October 31, 1862.
