= Thomas M. Foote =

American diplomat and newspaper editor (1808–1858)

- Born: August 9, 1808
- Died: February 20, 1858 (aged 49)
- Education: Hamilton College; College of Physicians and Surgeons
- Occupations: Diplomat, newspaper editor
- Spouse: Margaret (St. John) Foote

Thomas Moses Foote (August 9, 1808 – February 20, 1858) was an American diplomat and newspaper editor.

== Biography ==
=== Early life ===
Thomas Moses Foote was born on August 9, 1808. Thomas Moses Foote graduated from Hamilton College in 1825. He went on to study medicine at the College of Physicians and Surgeons in Fairfield, New York where he received his medical diploma.

=== Career ===
He practiced medicine for a short time and later pursued a career to journalism. He was editor of the Albany State Register and the Buffalo Commercial Advertiser. Foote's editorial writings were distinguished for wit and grace of diction. He was a man of extensive reading and an entertaining talker.

On May 29, 1849, President Zachary Taylor (12th President of the United States) appointed Thomas Moses Foote served as U.S. Chargé d’Affaires to New Granada (Colombia). He was commissioned during a recess of the Senate; recommissioned on March 18, 1850, after confirmation. Thomas Moses Foote Presentation of Credentials: January 5, 1850 and left this post about October 15, 1850.

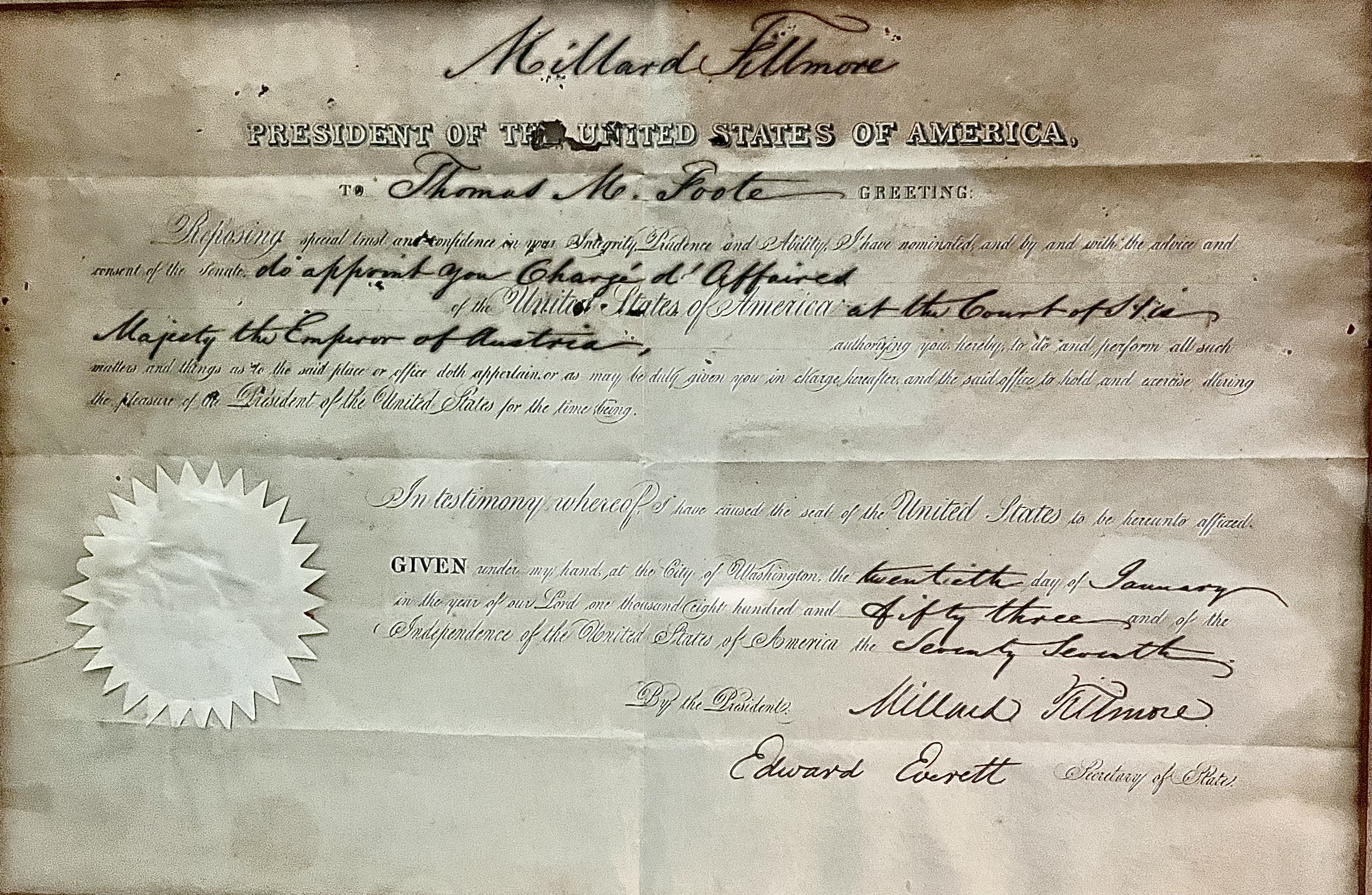
Appointment by President Filmore

Later appointed by President Millard Fillmore (13th President of the United States) on September 16, 1852, he was appointed as U.S. Chargé d’Affaires to the Austrian Empire. Commissioned during a recess of the Senate; recommissioned after confirmation on January 20, 1853. Thomas Moses Foote Presentation of Credentials: December 14, 1852. Termination of Mission: Presented recall on June 25, 1853.

Thomas M. Foote had projected a life of Fillmore, but failing health compelled the abandonment of the project. Use of the material which he had prepared devolved on Foote's associate on the "Commercial" staff, Ivory Chamberlain. cf. Buffalo Historical Society, Publications, vol. XI.

=== Personal life ===
Thomas Moses Foote was the son of Moses Foote III and Martha Foote (Brown). Thomas Moses Foote had two sisters.

He was married August 10, 1836 to Margaret St. John of Buffalo. On July 27, 1849, while packing for their journey to Bogota, Margaret contracted cholera and died. On 18 June 1851, he married Julia Allen Wilkeson, daughter of General Ethan B. Allen, widow of Eli R. Wilkeson (son of Judge Samuel Wilkeson, who had also married one of the St. John daughters). During the stay in Vienna, Julia entered the final stages of tuberculosis. The day after their return to New York City on the Baltic Collins Line steamship Baltic, his wife died at the age of 33, reportedly having been in feeble health for some time. In 1857, he married a third time, to Maria Bird, daughter of Col. William A. Bird, but he died shortly after this marriage. He had two children by Margaret St. John. His daughter, Helen Margaret Foote was born on May 26, 1839 in Buffalo, Erie County, New York. Helen later married Colonel Theodore B. Hamilton, son of Dr. Frank Hastings Hamilton and Mary Van Doren Van Arsdale. Helen Margaret Foote died on 14-Feb-1876 at Plainfield, Union County, New Jersey, at age 36.

=== Death ===
He died in Buffalo on February 20, 1858, after an illness of five days. Thomas M. Foote is buried at Forest Lawn in Buffalo, Erie County, New York, Plot Section 20 lot 68, east 1/2.

Diplomatic posts
| Preceded by Benjamin A. Bidlack | U.S. Chargé to New Granada; 1850 | Succeeded by Yelverton P. King |
| Preceded by Charles J. McCurdy | U.S. Chargé to the Austrian Empire; 1852–1853 | Succeeded by Henry R. Jackson |
