= James Semple =

American lawyer and politician (1798–1866)

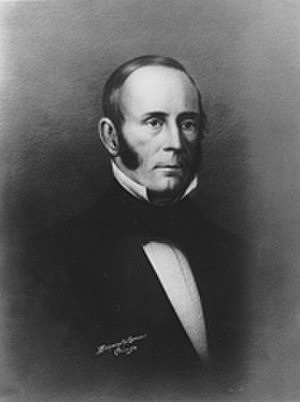

United States Senator from Illinois
- In office December 4, 1843 – March 3, 1847
- Preceded by: Samuel McRoberts
- Succeeded by: Stephen A. Douglas

Associate Justice of the Illinois Supreme Court
- In office January 1843 – August 1843
- Preceded by: Sidney Breese
- Succeeded by: James Shields

Chargé d'Affaires to New Granada
- In office 1838–1842
- President: Martin Van Buren; William Henry Harrison; John Tyler
- Preceded by: Robert B. McAfee
- Succeeded by: William M. Blackford

Speaker of the Illinois House of Representatives
- In office 1834–1837
- Preceded by: Alexander M. Jenkins
- Succeeded by: William Lee D. Ewing

Attorney General of Illinois
- In office 1832–1834
- Governor: John Reynolds
- Preceded by: George Forquer
- Succeeded by: Ninian Wirt Edwards

Member of Illinois House of Representatives
- In office 1834–1837
- In office 1828–1832

Personal details
- Born: January 5, 1798 Green County, Kentucky, U.S.
- Died: December 20, 1866 (aged 68) Elsah, Illinois, U.S.
- Resting place: Bellefontaine Cemetery
- Party: Democratic
- Relations: Lansing B. Mizner (stepson); Addison Mizner (step-grandson); Wilson Mizner (step-grandson)
- Children: Eugene Semple and others
- Profession: Attorney businessman

Military service
- Allegiance: United States
- Branch/service: Kentucky Militia; Missouri Militia; Illinois Militia
- Years of service: 1814–1817 (Kentucky); 1819–1824 (Missouri); 1829–1834 (Illinois)
- Rank: Brigadier General
- Unit: 81st Infantry Regiment (Kentucky); 21st Infantry Regiment (Missouri); 8th Infantry Regiment (Illinois)
- Battles/wars: War of 1812; Black Hawk War

James Semple (January 5, 1798 – December 20, 1866) was an American attorney and politician. He was Speaker of the Illinois House of Representatives, Attorney General of Illinois, an associate justice of the Illinois Supreme Court, Chargé d'Affaires to New Granada, and United States Senator from Illinois.

Semple was born in Green County, Kentucky, and was raised and educated in Clinton County. He served in the Kentucky militia during the War of 1812 and then moved to Missouri, where he was active in the militia and owned and operated several businesses. He later studied law in Missouri and Kentucky, attained admission to the bar, and moved to Edwardsville, Illinois, to start a practice. He became active in politics as a Democrat, but was opposed to slavery, and he served in the Illinois House of Representatives from 1828 to 1832. He continued his militia service after moving to Illinois, and took part in the Black Hawk War. After service as Illinois Attorney General from 1832 to 1834, Semple returned to the Illinois House, where he served as Speaker from 1834 to 1837.

From 1838 to 1842, Semple served as US Chargé d'Affaires in New Granada. Upon returning to Illinois, he was appointed an associate justice of the Illinois Supreme Court, but he served only a few months because later that year he was selected to fill a vacancy in the US Senate, where he served from 1843 to 1847.

After leaving politics, Semple practiced law, was active in several business ventures, and attempted to market an invention called the prairie car, a forerunner of the modern automobile. He died in Elsah, Illinois, a town he founded, and was buried at Bellefontaine Cemetery in St. Louis, Missouri.

== Early life ==
James Semple was born in Green County, Kentucky, on January 5, 1798, the son of John Walker Semple and Lucy (Robertson) Semple. Semple's grandfather Robert Semple served in the Virginia legislature, and his father served in the legislature of Kentucky. James Semple was raised on his father's Clinton County homestead, which John Sample named "76". He received his early education from his mother, a talented woman educated enough to argue cases in court when no lawyers were available, and was tutored by his uncle Isaac Robertson, who was a graduate of Princeton College.

== Start of career ==
In 1814, the sixteen-year-old Semple volunteered for the Kentucky Militia during the War of 1812. He served until the end war, and in 1817 received a commission as an ensign in Kentucky's 81st Militia Regiment.

In 1818, Semple moved to Edwardsville, Illinois, but he remained for only nine months before returning to Kentucky. In 1819, he moved to Chariton, Missouri, where he operated a tannery and became active in other business ventures. In addition, he joined the Missouri Militia's 21st Infantry Regiment, which he later commanded with the rank of colonel. Soon after arriving in Chariton, Semple was elected a state Loan Commissioner. In response to the Panic of 1819, Missouri's government authorized the issuing of paper money that could be loaned to farmers so that they wouldn't lose their land during the economic downturn. Loan Office Banks throughout the state were supervised by commissioners who loaned the money, ensured it was repaid, and instituted foreclosure proceedings and auctions for farmers who defaulted on their loans.

After the sudden death of his first wife in 1821, Semple decided on a career as an attorney and began to study law. He moved to Louisville, Kentucky, in 1824 to continue his studies, and after three years of learning he was admitted to the bar and returned to Edwardsville in 1827 to start a law practice.

== Continued career ==
Semple practiced law in Edwardsville and became active in politics. Though he opposed slavery, he became a Democrat, and advocated abolition in opposition to most members of his party, who either supported slavery or accepted that it could continue where it already existed. During the Black Hawk War of 1832, Semple was appointed adjutant of the Illinois Militia's 8th Infantry Regiment, then adjutant of a newly organized mounted regiment, and then aide-de-camp to Brigadier General Samuel Whiteside and judge advocate of Whiteside's brigade. Semple later commanded the 8th Regiment as a colonel, and subsequently attained the rank of brigadier general.

In 1828, Semple was elected to the Illinois House of Representatives, and he served until 1832. He served as Illinois Attorney General from 1832 to 1834, and did not run for reelection, preferring instead to become a candidate for the Illinois House. He won a House seat and was chosen to serve as Speaker of the House, a post he held until 1837. In 1836, Semple was an unsuccessful candidate for the U.S. Senate. In addition to practicing law, he became involved in business ventures including real estate speculation, and was one of the founders of the town of Highland and the villages of Tamaroa and Marine. In 1837, he moved to Alton, where he continued to practice law.

== Diplomat ==
In 1837, President Martin Van Buren appointed Semple as Chargé d'Affaires in New Granada. Semple had not sought the appointment, but decided to accept. He was confirmed by the U.S. Senate, and served from October 14, 1837, until resigning on March 4, 1842.

As Chargé, Semple was empowered to act as a minister, and was commended by New Granada's government and members of the various groups opposed to it for the tact and fairness with which he advocated for U.S. interests without showing favoritism.

== U.S. Senator ==
On January 6, 1843, Semple was appointed an associate justice of the Illinois Supreme Court, filling the vacancy left when Sidney Breese resigned to accept election to the U.S. Senate. He served until August 16, 1843, and was succeeded by James Shields. Semple left the court to accept election to the U.S. Senate seat left vacant by the death of Samuel McRoberts. He served the remainder of the term to which Roberts had been elected, August 16, 1843, to March 3, 1847, and was not a candidate for reelection in 1846.

In the Senate, Semple was concerned primarily with resolving the Oregon boundary dispute, which was ended by passage of the Oregon Treaty in 1846. Semple also proposed reform of the U.S. consular system. Consular appointments were patronage positions, and most incumbents received no salary, but were compensated by the fees they were allowed to charge for notarizing travel documents, verifying the passenger manifests of arriving U.S. ships, and verifying the contents of arriving U.S. cargo ships. Semple introduced a bill that would have professionalized the consular corps and provided for the payment of salaries in lieu of fees, but it was not adopted during his time in the Senate.

At the outbreak of the Mexican–American War, Semple sought an Army commission as commander of a regiment or brigade, but was refused by President James K. Polk, who was unhappy that Semple disagreed with the results of the Polk administration's negotiations over Oregon.

== Later life ==
In 1845, Semple began work on a vehicle he called a prairie car, a forerunner of the automobile. Semple's prairie car was a wagon fitted with a steam engine and wide tires that enabled it to run on roads or rough terrain. He attracted investors in the project, formed a corporation and issued stock, but abandoned the effort when manufacturers proved unable to provide the needed parts, and mechanics proved unable to purchase or make the tools necessary to effect repairs on his prototype. Semple left his prototype in a field outside Springfield, where for many years it was pointed out to newcomers to town as "Semple's Folly".

After leaving the Senate in 1847, Semple resumed practicing law in Alton. He was also a participant in several businesses, including investing in land north of Alton where he laid out a community known as Sempletown. This enterprise did not succeed, and Semple decided to leave Alton. He purchased an estate in Jersey County, where in 1853 he founded the town of Elsah, Illinois, and owned businesses including a mill and a distillery. In retirement, he served as Elsah's postmaster and worked on a history of Mexico, Central America and South America, but his manuscript was never published. During the American Civil War, Semple was sympathetic to the states' rights arguments of the Confederacy, but remained loyal to the Union and supported measures including loyalty oaths.

== Death and burial ==
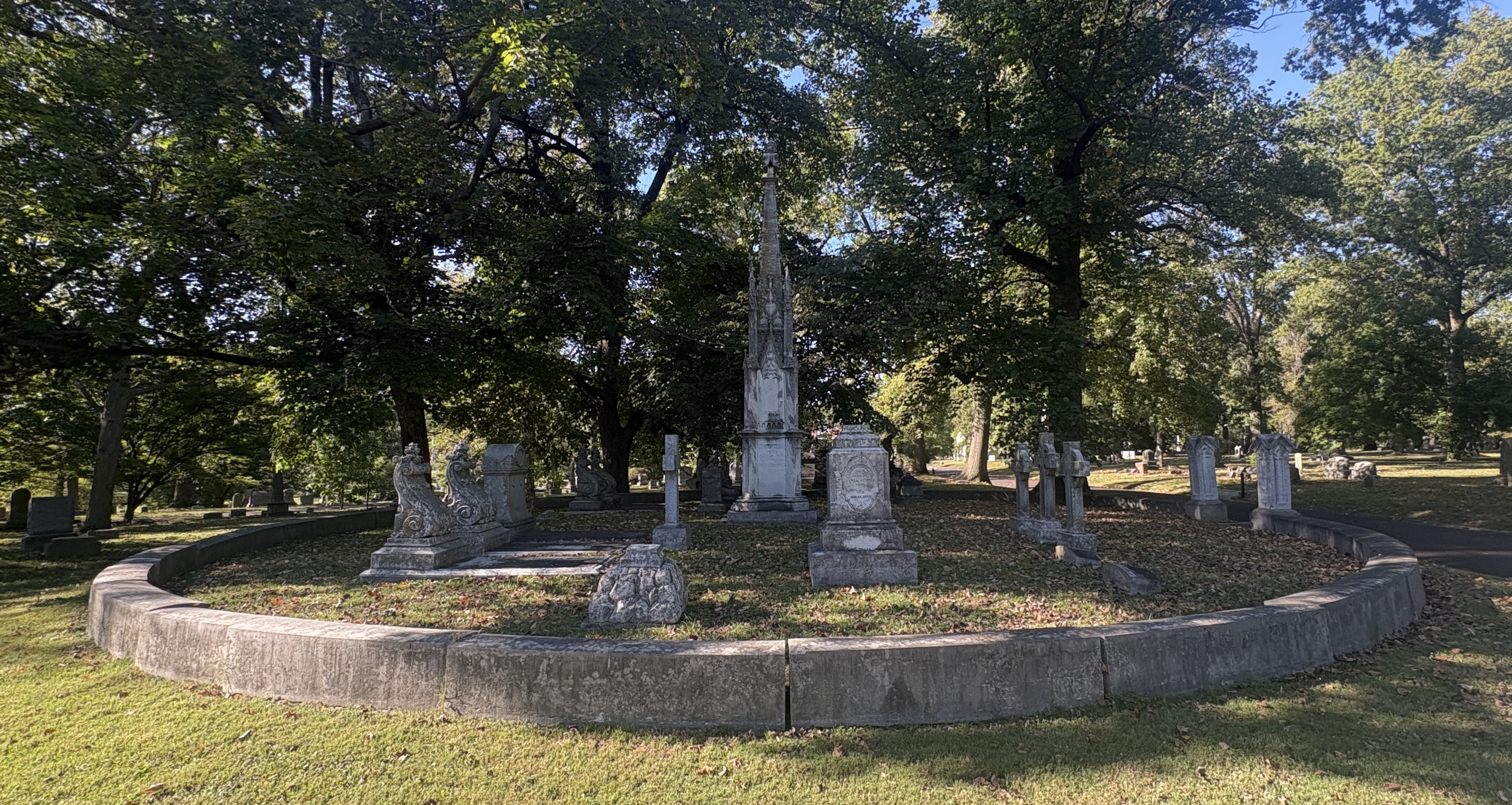
Semple's grave at Bellefontaine Cemetery

James Semple died in Elsah on December 20, 1866, and was buried at Bellefontaine Cemetery in St. Louis.

== Family ==
In 1819, Semple married Ellen Duff Green, a niece of Duff Green. She died in 1821, and in 1833 Semple married Mary Stevenson Mizner, a daughter of Dr. Caldwell Cairns and Mary (Stevenson) Cairns, and the widow of Henry Mizner.

Semple's stepson, Lansing B. Mizner was an American politician and diplomat who served as U.S. Minister to several Central American countries. His step-grandson Addison Mizner was an architect, and step-grandson Wilson Mizner was a playwright.

Eugene Semple, the son of James and Mary Semple, served as Governor of Washington Territory from 1887 to 1889. His daughter Lucy Virginia became the wife of wealthy St. Louis businessman Edgar Ames. After his death, Lucy Ames expanded her husband's business holdings and added to his fortune, and became prominent as an advocate for political causes including women's suffrage and higher education for women. His daughter Julia was the wife of Ashley D. Scott, who operated a successful grocery wholesale business in St. Louis and a founder of the Mystic Order of Veiled Prophets of the Enchanted Realm and organizer of the Veiled Prophet Ball.

Dr. Robert Semple, a brother of James Semple, was a founder of Benicia, California, and president of California's 1849 constitutional convention.

== Sources ==
=== Magazines ===
- Cushman, Mary Semple Ames (1910). "Biography: General James Semple". Transactions of the Illinois State Historical Society. Vol. 10. Springfield, IL.
- Force, Peter (1834). "Intercourse with Foreign Nations". The National Calendar, and Annals of the United States. Vol. 12. Washington, DC: Pishey Thompson and Franck Taylor.
- Radcliffe, Zoe Greene (June 1, 1927). "Robert Baylor Semple, Pioneer". California Historical Society Quarterly. Sacramento, CA: California Historical Society. Archived from the original on June 1, 2018.
- Williams, John W. (Fall 2003). "James Semple: Founder of Elsah and Political Entrepreneur". Elsah History. Elsah, IL: Historic Elsah Foundation.

=== Books ===
- Leab, Daniel (2014). Encyclopedia of American Recessions and Depressions. Vol. 2. Santa Barbara, CA: ABC-CLIO. ISBN 978-1-59884-946-2.

U.S. Senate
Preceded by Samuel McRoberts	U.S. senator (Class 2) from Illinois; 1843–1847; Served alongside: Sidney Breese	Succeeded by Stephen A. Douglas
Diplomatic posts
Preceded by Robert B. McAfee	United States Chargé d'Affaires, New Granada; April 21, 1838 – March 4, 1842	Succeeded by William M. Blackford
