= John W. Garrett (diplomat) =

American diplomat

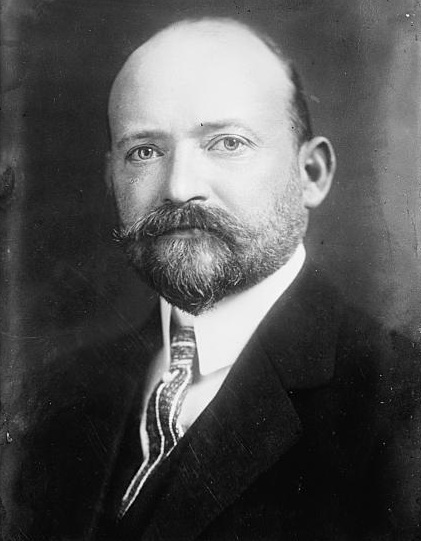

United States Ambassador to Italy
- In office November 20, 1929 – May 22, 1933
- President: Herbert Hoover; Franklin D. Roosevelt
- Preceded by: Henry P. Fletcher
- Succeeded by: Breckinridge Long

United States Ambassador to Luxembourg
- In office November 11, 1917 – June 18, 1919
- President: Woodrow Wilson
- Preceded by: Henry van Dyke
- Succeeded by: William Phillips

United States Ambassador to the Netherlands
- In office October 11, 1917 – June 18, 1919
- President: Woodrow Wilson
- Preceded by: Henry van Dyke
- Succeeded by: William Phillips

20th United States Minister to Argentina
- In office February 29, 1912 – November 22, 1913
- President: William Howard Taft; Woodrow Wilson
- Preceded by: Charles Hitchcock Sherrill
- Succeeded by: Frederic Jesup Stimson

United States Ambassador to Venezuela
- In office March 30, 1911 – October 21, 1911
- President: William Howard Taft
- Preceded by: William W. Russell
- Succeeded by: Elliott Northcott

Personal details
- Born: John Work Garrett; May 19, 1872 Baltimore, Maryland, U.S.
- Died: June 26, 1942 (aged 70) Baltimore, Maryland, U.S.
- Resting place: Green Mount Cemetery
- Party: Democrat; Republican
- Spouse: Alice Warder (m. 1908)
- Relations: John W. Garrett (grandfather)
- Parent(s): Thomas Harrison Garrett; Alice Dickerson Whitridge
- Education: Princeton University

John Work Garrett (May 19, 1872 – June 26, 1942) was an American diplomat. His postings included Minister to Venezuela, Argentina, and the Netherlands, and Ambassador to Italy.

== Early life ==
Garrett was born in Baltimore, Maryland on May 19, 1872. He was the son of Alice Dickerson (née Whitridge) Garrett (1851–1920) and Thomas Harrison Garrett (1849–1888), who operated the family's bank in Baltimore. His younger brother Robert S. Garrett (1875–1961) became an American Olympic champion, as well as investment banker and archeological excavation philanthropist. He was also the grandson of John W. Garrett, a banker and the president of the Baltimore and Ohio Railroad, and nephew of Robert Garrett, who also served as President of the B&O.

Garrett graduated from Princeton University, with a B.S. degree, in 1895 and began a career at the bank owned by his family. He later received an honorary LL.D. from St. John's College in Annapolis, Maryland.

== Career ==
In 1901, Garrett embarked on a diplomatic career with appointment as Secretary of the United States legation at The Hague. In 1905, he transferred to a similar position in Berlin, and in 1908 another transfer brought him to Rome.

Garrett was appointed Minister to Venezuela in 1910 and served until 1911, when he was appointed as Minister to Argentina.

In 1914, Garrett left Argentina when he was appointed as a special assistant to the Ambassador to France. He served in this post until 1917. As an American diplomat in Europe during World War I, Garrett took part in commissions and conferences on the handling of prisoners of war and other war-related issues.

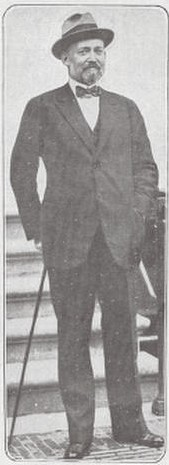
John W. Garrett in the Netherlands, 1918

From 1917 to 1919, Garrett served as Minister to the Netherlands and Luxembourg.

Originally a Democrat, Garrett later became a Republican and served as a Delegate to the 1920 Republican National Convention. In 1922 he was an unsuccessful candidate for the Republican nomination for U.S. Senator, losing to incumbent Joseph I. France. (France went on to lose the general election to William Cabell Bruce). In 1924, he was again a Delegate to the Republican National Convention.

Garrett served as Ambassador to Italy from 1929 to 1933.

=== Later life ===
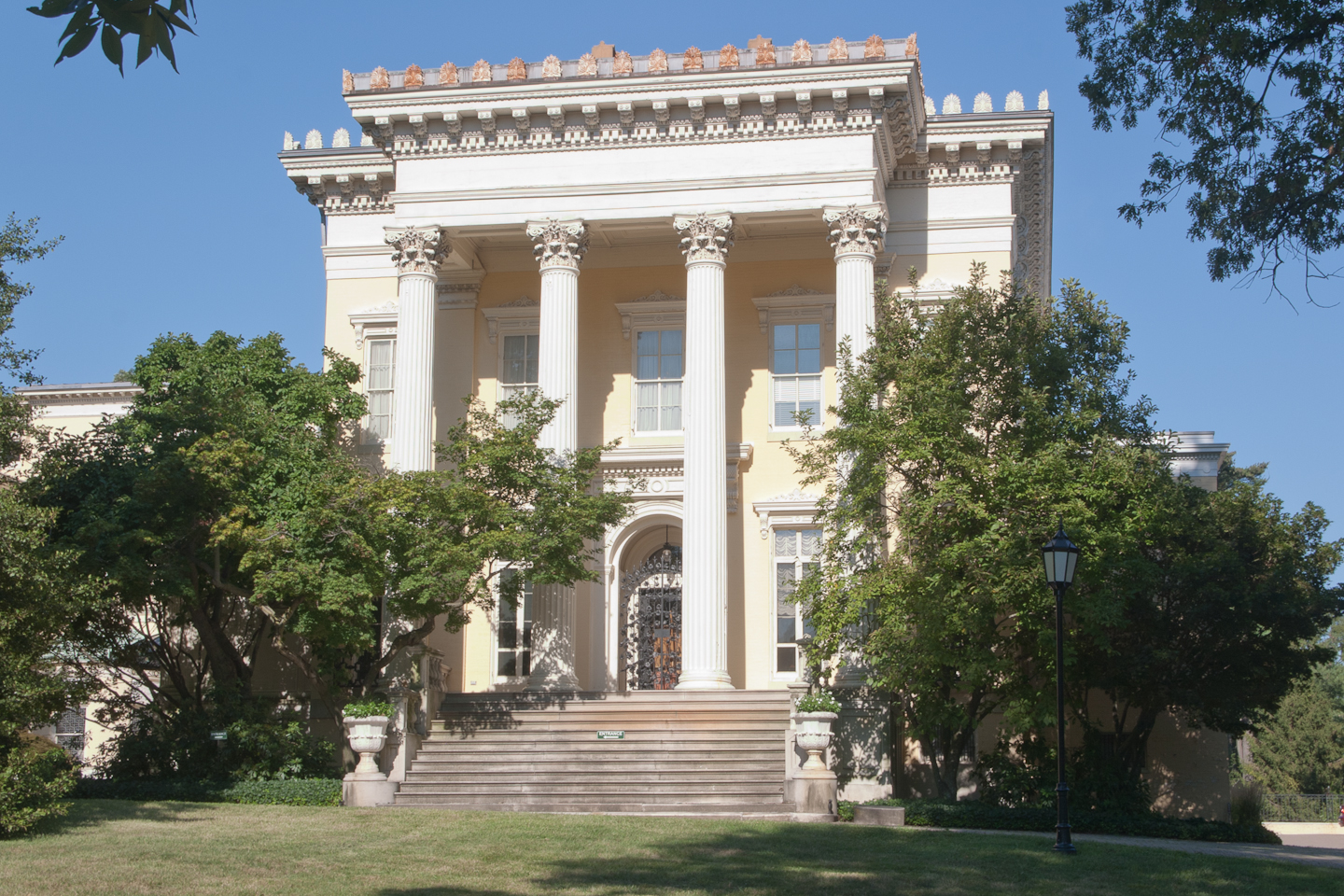
Garrett's home in Baltimore, Evergreen, circa 2011.

In retirement, Garrett resided at Evergreen, the Garrett family mansion which is now a museum and library of the Johns Hopkins University. Garrett and his wife, Alice Warder Garrett, entertained and patronized artists, filling the house with Tiffany lamps, paintings by Zuloaga, Pablo Picasso, Raoul Dufy, Degas and Amedeo Modigliani and a custom-designed stage by Leon Bakst.

== Personal life ==
On December 24, 1908, Garrett was married to Alice Warder (1877–1952), who shared his love of the arts and travel.

Garrett died at his Evergreen home in Baltimore on June 26, 1942. He was buried in Baltimore's Green Mount Cemetery.

=== Legacy ===
Garrett and several of his family members were well known collectors of rare books and manuscripts, coins and other items. He donated his papers and much of his library to Johns Hopkins University, and many of his other items are still bought and sold by collectors.

The John Work Garrett Professorship in Politics at Princeton University was established by a gift from Garrett and his brother Robert Garrett.

Diplomatic posts
Preceded by William W. Russell	U.S. Minister to Venezuela; 1910–1911	Succeeded by Elliott Northcott
Preceded by John Ridgely Carter	U.S. Minister to Argentina; 1911–1914	Succeeded by Frederic Jesup Stimson
Preceded by Henry van Dyke	U.S. Minister to the Netherlands; 1917–1919	Succeeded by William Phillips
Preceded by Henry van Dyke	U.S. Minister to Luxembourg; 1917–1919	Succeeded by William Phillips
Preceded by Henry P. Fletcher	United States Ambassador to Italy; 1929–1933	Succeeded by Breckinridge Long
