= Capus M. Waynick =

American newspaperman, politician, and diplomat

Adjutant General of North Carolina
- In office 1957–1961
- Governor: Luther Hodges
- Preceded by: John H. Manning
- Succeeded by: Claude T. Bowers

United States Ambassador to Colombia
- In office August 23, 1951 – September 21, 1953
- President: Harry S. Truman
- Preceded by: Willard L. Beaulac
- Succeeded by: Rudolf E. Schoenfeld

United States Ambassador to Nicaragua
- In office July 12, 1949 – July 22, 1951
- President: Harry S. Truman
- Preceded by: George P. Shaw
- Succeeded by: Thomas E. Whelan

Chair of the North Carolina Democratic Party
- In office 1948–1949

Member of the North Carolina Senate from the 17th district
- In office November 8, 1932 – November 6, 1934 Serving with Allen H. Gwyn
- Preceded by: John T. Burrus
- Succeeded by: John T. Burrus

Member of the North Carolina House of Representatives from Guilford County
- In office November 4, 1930 – November 8, 1932 Serving with E. B. Jeffress, Thomas Turner Jr.

Personal details
- Born: Capus Miller Waynick; December 23, 1889
- Died: September 7, 1986 (aged 96)
- Party: Democratic

Capus Miller Waynick (December 23, 1889 – September 7, 1986) was an American newspaperman, politician, and diplomat.

Born in Rockingham County, North Carolina, Waynick enrolled at the University of North Carolina at Chapel Hill but did not graduate. He became a reporter for the Greensboro Record and eventually rose to become its publisher, and later editor of the High Point Enterprise. Waynick, a Democrat, was elected to one term in the North Carolina House of Representatives and to one term in the North Carolina Senate. He held a variety of offices in the North Carolina state government, managed the successful gubernatorial campaign of Kerr Scott, and was the chairman of the North Carolina Democratic Party in 1948–1949. President Harry Truman appointed him to serve as U.S. Ambassador to Nicaragua (1949–1951) and then to Colombia (1951–1953). Waynick served as adjutant general of the North Carolina National Guard under Gov. Luther Hodges from 1957 to 1961.

Diplomatic posts
Preceded by George P. Shaw	United States Ambassador to Nicaragua; 1949–1951	Succeeded by Thomas E. Whelan
Preceded by Willard L. Beaulac	United States Ambassador to Colombia; 1951–1953	Succeeded by Rudolf E. Schoenfeld
