= Arthur M. Beaupre =

American diplomat

Arthur Matthias Beaupre
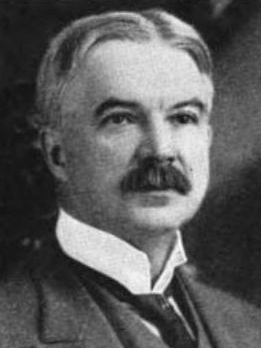

United States Ambassador to Cuba
- In office December 18, 1911 – June 28, 1913
- President: William Howard Taft; Woodrow Wilson
- Preceded by: John B. Jackson
- Succeeded by: William Elliott Gonzales

United States Ambassador to Luxembourg
- In office July 8, 1908 – September 25, 1911
- President: Theodore Roosevelt; William Howard Taft
- Preceded by: David Jayne Hill
- Succeeded by: Lloyd Bryce

United States Ambassador to the Netherlands
- In office June 15, 1908 – September 25, 1911
- President: Theodore Roosevelt; William Howard Taft
- Preceded by: David Jayne Hill
- Succeeded by: Lloyd Bryce

17th United States Minister to Argentina
- In office June 17, 1904 – May 2, 1908
- President: Theodore Roosevelt
- Preceded by: John Barrett
- Succeeded by: Spencer F. Eddy

United States Ambassador to Colombia
- In office April 13, 1903 – December 19, 1903
- President: Theodore Roosevelt
- Preceded by: Charles Burdett Hart
- Succeeded by: William W. Russell

Personal details
- Born: Arthur Matthias Beaupre; July 29, 1853 Oswego, Illinois, US
- Died: September 13, 1919 (aged 66) Chicago, Illinois, US
- Resting place: Graceland Cemetery
- Party: Republican
- Spouse: Mary Marsh

Arthur Matthias Beaupre (July 29, 1853 – September 13, 1919) was an American diplomat. He served in several ambassadorships, including Colombia, Argentina, the Netherlands, Luxembourg, and Cuba.

== Early life ==
Beaupre was born in Oswego, Illinois on July 29, 1853. His family moved to DeKalb County when he was a boy, and at age 16 Beaupre started work as a printer for the Dekalb County News newspaper and advanced through several positions to become a reporter.

== Career ==
In 1874, Beaupre relocated to Aurora, Illinois, studied law, and attained admission to the bar. A Republican, shortly afterwards he was elected Clerk of the City Court. He won election to a second term, but before it began he resigned to accept the position of Deputy Clerk for Kane County. In 1886, Beaupre was elected Kane County Clerk, and in 1890 he was reelected to a second four-year term.

=== Diplomatic career ===
After leaving the Clerk's office, in 1897 Beaupre embarked on a career as a diplomat when he was appointed U.S. Consul in Guatemala City, Guatemala, where he served until 1899. In 1900, he was appointed Consul in Bogota, Colombia.

Beaupre was appointed Minister to Colombia in 1903 and he served until 1904, when he was named Minister to Argentina.

From 1908 to 1911 Beaupre served as both Minister to the Netherlands and Minister to Luxembourg. In 1911 he was appointed as Minister to Cuba, where he served until retiring in 1913.

== Personal life ==
On October 20, 1880, Beaupre was married to Mary Marsh (1863–1947), the daughter of Charles Wesley Marsh. Her father and her uncle, William Wallace Marsh, started Marsh, Steward & Company and were responsible for the invention and patent of a reaper-harvester. They were the parents of one child:

- Beatrice Beaupre (b. 1884).

Beaupre died in Chicago, Illinois on September 13, 1919, two days after suffering a stroke. He is buried in Graceland Cemetery.

Diplomatic posts
Preceded by Charles Burdett Hart	U.S. Minister to Colombia; 1903–1904	Succeeded by William W. Russell
Preceded by John Barrett	U.S. Minister to Argentina; 1904–1908	Succeeded by Spencer F. Eddy
Preceded by David Jayne Hill	U.S. Minister to the Netherlands; 1908–1911	Succeeded by Lloyd Bryce
Preceded by David Jayne Hill	U.S. Minister to Luxembourg; 1908–1911	Succeeded by Lloyd Bryce
Preceded by John B. Jackson	U.S. Minister to Cuba; 1911–1913	Succeeded by William Elliott Gonzales
