= Albert F. Nufer =

American diplomat

32nd United States ambassador to Argentina
- In office August 14, 1952 – May 12, 1956
- Preceded by: Ellsworth Bunker
- Succeeded by: Willard L. Beaulac

Personal details
- Born: October 21, 1894 New York, New York, U.S.
- Died: November 6, 1956 (aged 62) Manila, Philippines
- Parent(s): Frank Xavier; Dora

Albert Frank Nufer (October 21, 1894 – November 6, 1956) was an American diplomat who served as an ambassador to El Salvador, Argentina and the Philippines.

== Early life ==
Albert Frank Nufer was born on October 21, 1894 in New York City to Frank Xavier Nufer and Dora Nufer.

== Career ==
Prior to serving as an ambassador, he worked as a Career Foreign Service Officer (FSO).

He served as Ambassador to El Salvador from August 13, 1947 to July 16, 1949.

He served as ambassador to Argentina from August 14, 1952, until May 12, 1956. In fall 1953, as ambassador to Argentina, Nufer and President Juan Perón discussed the United States providing financial and military assistance to Argentina in order to "fight communism".

He served as ambassador to the Philippines from July 20, 1956 until his death on November 6, 1956. During his short time in this position, he negotiated with President Ramon Magsaysay over concerns regarding United States military bases in the Philippines, such as jurisdiction, enforcement of local laws, the presence of two flags, and overall fairness. In addition, he met with then vice president of the Philippines, and Magsaysay's successor, Carlos P. Garcia.

== Death ==
Nufer died on November 6, 1956 at the age of 62 at his residence in Manila, Philippines. His cause of death was described as a coronary thrombosis, though it has also been described as a heart attack.
