= Samuel McRoberts =

American politician (1799–1843)

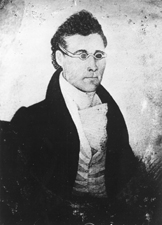

United States Senator from Illinois
- In office March 4, 1841 – March 27, 1843
- Preceded by: John M. Robinson
- Succeeded by: James Semple

Member of the Illinois Senate
- In office 1828-1830
- Preceded by: Joseph A. Beaird

Personal details
- Born: April 12, 1799 Maeystown, Illinois, U.S.
- Died: March 27, 1843 (aged 43) Cincinnati, Ohio, U.S.
- Party: Democratic

Samuel McRoberts (April 12, 1799 – March 27, 1843) was a United States senator from Illinois. Born near Maeystown, he was educated by private tutors and graduated from the law department of Transylvania University in Lexington, Kentucky. He was admitted to the bar in 1821 and commenced practice in Monroe County, and was clerk of the circuit court of Monroe County from 1819 to 1821. He was State circuit judge from 1824 to 1827 and a member of the Illinois State Senate from 1828 to 1830.

McRoberts was appointed United States Attorney by President Andrew Jackson in 1830 and served until 1832, when he resigned he was then appointed by President Martin Van Buren to be receiver of the land office at Danville in 1832. He was appointed Solicitor of the General Land Office at Washington in 1839 and served in that capacity until his resignation in 1841, and was elected as a Democrat to the United States Senate and served from March 4, 1841, until his death; while in the Senate he was chairman of the Committee on Engrossed Bills (Twenty-seventh Congress). He died in Cincinnati, Ohio and was interred in the Moore Cemetery, Waterloo.

== See also ==
- List of members of the United States Congress who died in office (1790–1899)

U.S. Senate
Preceded by John McCracken Robinson	U.S. senator (Class 2) from Illinois; 1841–1843; Served alongside: Richard M. Young, Sidney Breese	Succeeded by James Semple
