= James B. Bowlin =

American politician (1804–1874)

James Butler Bowlin
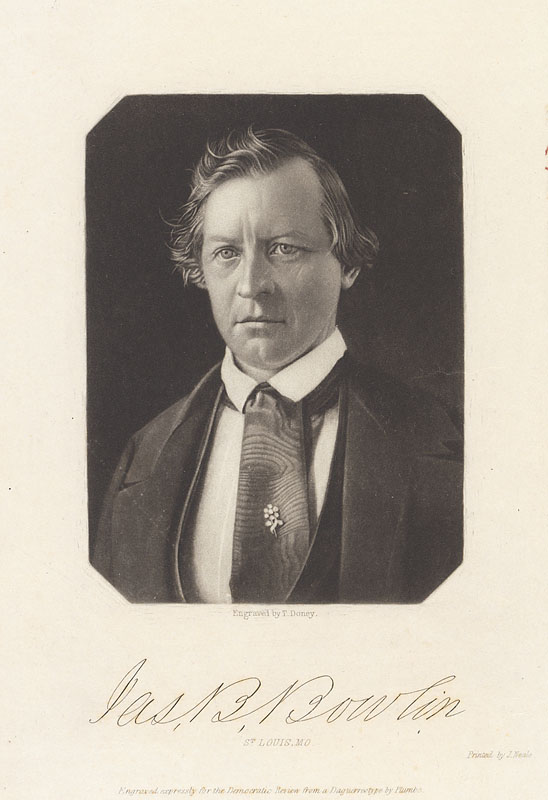
- James B. Bowlin

United States Minister to New Granada
- In office April 10, 1855 – May 20, 1857
- President: Franklin Pierce
- Preceded by: James S. Green
- Succeeded by: George W. Jones

Member of the U.S. House of Representatives from Missouri
- In office March 4, 1843 – March 3, 1851
- Preceded by: John Miller (AL); District established (1st)
- Succeeded by: District eliminated (AL); John F. Darby (1st)
- Constituency: At-large district (1843-47); 1st district (1847-51)

Personal details
- Born: 16 January 1804 Spotsylvania County, Virginia, U.S.
- Died: 19 July 1874 (aged 70) St. Louis, Missouri, U.S.
- Party: Democratic
- Occupation: Lawyer, politician
- Known for: Diplomat, U.S. Representative

James Butler Bowlin (January 16, 1804 – July 19, 1874) was a U.S. representative from Missouri. Born in Spotsylvania County, Virginia near Fredericksburg, Bowlin took an apprenticeship to a trade but abandoned it to teach at a school. He received a classical education and moved to Lewisburg, Virginia in 1825. Bowlin studied law and was admitted to the bar in 1822, commencing his practice in Greenbrier County. He moved to St. Louis, Missouri in 1833 and continued the practice of law. Bowlin also established the Farmers and Mechanics' Advocate. He owned slaves.

Bowlin served as Chief Clerk of the State House of Representatives in 1836. He served as a member of the Missouri House of Representatives in 1836 and 1837, was appointed district attorney for St. Louis in 1837, and was an unsuccessful candidate for the State House of Representatives in 1838. Bowlin was elected judge of the criminal court in 1839 and served until his resignation in 1842.

Bowlin was elected as a Democrat to the Twenty-eighth and to the three succeeding Congresses (March 4, 1843 – March 3, 1851). He served as chairman of the Committee on Private Land Claims (Twenty-ninth Congress), Committee on Public Lands (Thirty-first Congress). He was an unsuccessful candidate for reelection in 1850 to the Thirty-second Congress.

Bowlin was appointed Minister Resident to New Granada by President Pierce December 13, 1854. He was appointed commissioner to Paraguay by President Buchanan September 9, 1858, and served until February 10, 1859, when the expedition to that country ended.

Afterwards, Bowlin resumed the practice of law. He died in St. Louis, July 19, 1874, and was interred in Bellefontaine Cemetery.

U.S. House of Representatives
Preceded by John Miller	Member of the U.S. House of Representatives from Missouri's at-large congressional district 1843–1847	Succeeded by None (District dissolved)
Preceded by None (New district)	Member of the U.S. House of Representatives from Missouri's 1st congressional district 1847–1851	Succeeded by John Fletcher Darby
Diplomatic posts
Preceded by James S. Green	United States Minister to New Granada; 10 April 1855 – 20 May 1857	Succeeded by George Wallace Jones
