= Fulton Freeman =

American diplomat (1915–1974)

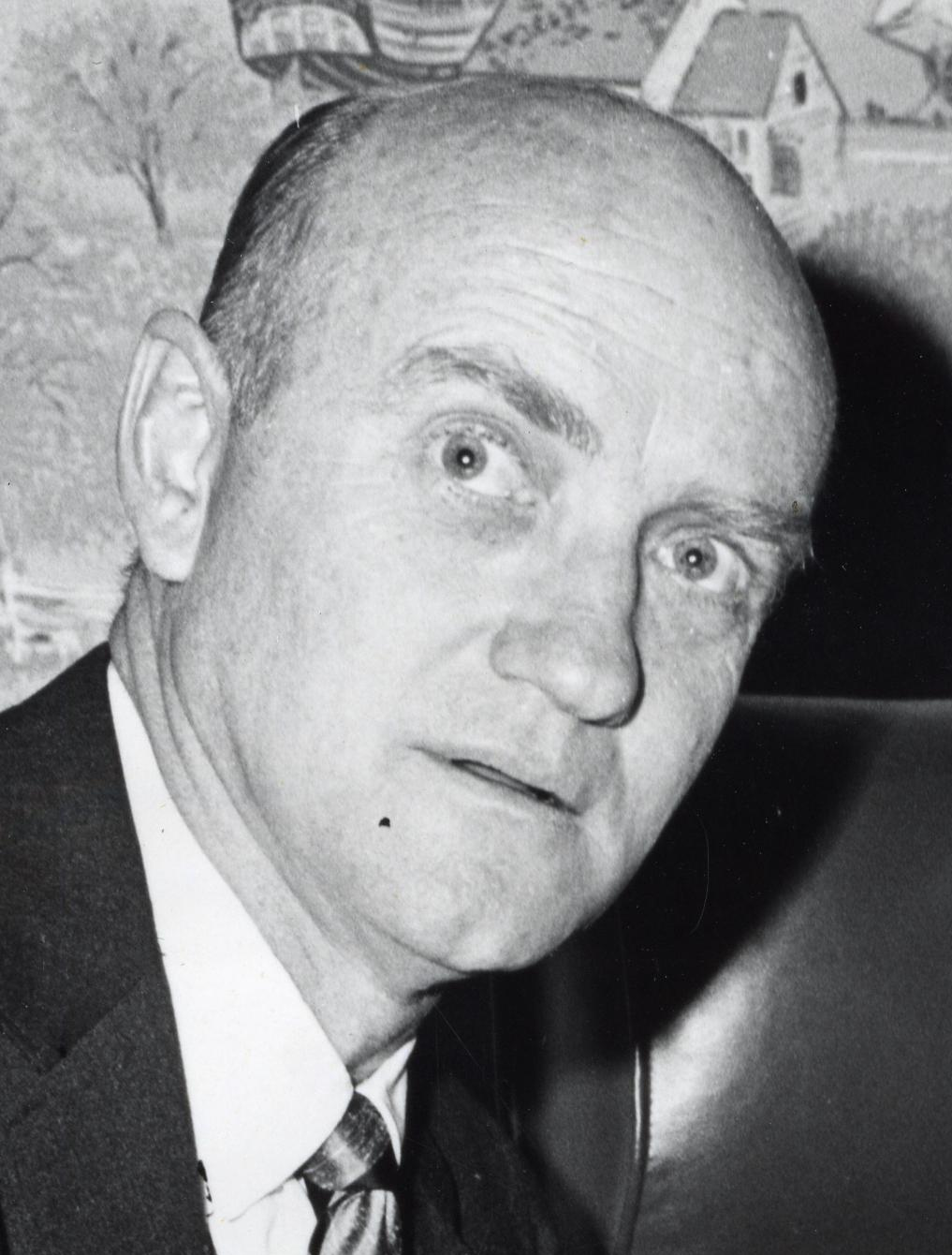
- Fulton Freeman, American ambassador to Mexico, seen here in Boston (April 17–23, 1966)

2nd President of the Monterey Institute of Foreign Studies
- In office 1969–1974
- Preceded by: Gaspard Etienne Weiss
- Succeeded by: Samson Benjamin Knoll

United States Ambassador to Mexico
- In office 1964–1969
- President: Lyndon B. Johnson
- Preceded by: Thomas C. Mann
- Succeeded by: Robert H. McBride

United States Ambassador to Colombia
- In office 1961–1964
- President: John F. Kennedy
- Preceded by: Dempster McIntosh
- Succeeded by: Covey T. Oliver

Personal details
- Born: May 7, 1915 Pasadena, California
- Died: December 14, 1974 (aged 59) Carmel, California
- Awards: Order of the Aztec Eagle

Fulton Freeman (May 7, 1915, Pasadena, California – December 14, 1974) was the American ambassador to Mexico (1964-1969) and Colombia (1961-1964), and president of the Monterey Institute of Foreign Studies since 1969.

Freeman attended Pasadena Junior College, and graduated from Pomona College in 1937.
