= Yelverton P. King =

American diplomat

Yelverton Peyton King (1794 – July 5, 1868) was an American lawyer, legislator, and diplomat from Georgia.

King was born in Greene County, Georgia about twelve miles outside Greensboro. He graduated from the University of Georgia and was admitted to the country bar at age 22. He was soon elected solicitor of the Ocmulgee circuit. He also served in the Georgia General Assembly.

Col. Yeverton King was sent into the Cherokee Nation by the state of Georgia to remove gold miners who were digging for gold in 1830.

In 1851, he was appointed Chargé d'Affaires to New Granada by President Millard Fillmore, and resigned in April 1853 due to poor health.

King married Eliza F. Strain and had five children. He died on July 5, 1868.

Diplomatic posts
Preceded by Thomas M. Foote	U.S. Chargé to New Granada; August 25, 1851 – April 5, 1853	Succeeded by James S. Green
