= Theophilus W. Smith =

American judge (1784–1845)

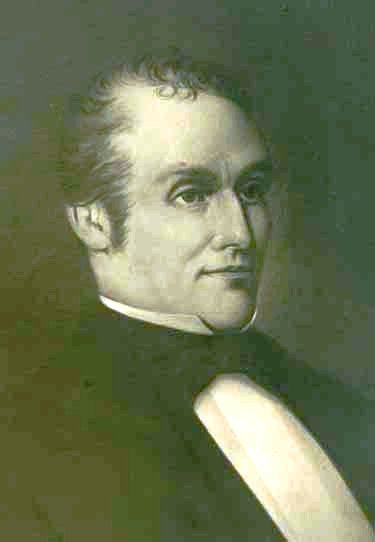

Illinois Supreme Court Justice
- In office 1825–1842

Personal details
- Born: September 28, 1784 New York City, New York
- Died: May 6, 1845 (aged 60)
- Profession: Judge

Theophilus Washington Smith (September 28, 1784 – May 6, 1845) was an Illinois Supreme Court Justice from 1825 until his resignation on December 26, 1842. He holds the distinction of being the subject of Illinois's first impeachment trial, held in 1833.

Smith was born in New York City and joined the navy before becoming a law student in the offices of Aaron Burr. He was admitted to the New York bar in 1805.

In 1816, Smith migrated to Illinois, settling in Edwardsville. He ran for state Attorney General in 1820, but was unsuccessful. In 1822, Smith was elected to the state Senate, where he served for four years. During this time, he was also the editor of a pro-slavery newspaper and attempted to adopt a new Illinois State Constitution in 1823 that would have legalized slavery in the state.

One of Smith's political rivals was Governor Ninian Edwards, upon whom Smith once drew a pistol. Edwards grabbed the gun away from Smith and broke Smith's jaw, leaving a scar.

Smith was elected as an associate justice to the Illinois Supreme Court in 1825. In late 1832, he was impeached by the General Assembly on charges of oppressive conduct, corruption, and high misdemeanors. In 1833, he was the subject of the first impeachment trial in Illinois history. Smith was acquitted by a vote of 12 for conviction to 10 for acquittal with 4 Senators "excused from voting." A two-thirds vote would have been necessary for a conviction. No further impeachment trials were held in Illinois until the impeachment of Governor Rod Blagojevich in 2009.

When Jean Baptiste Beaubien sued for the property on which Fort Dearborn stood, Smith wrote the Supreme Court's decision in favor of Beaubien's claim, although it was later overturned by the United States Supreme Court.

During the Black Hawk War, Smith served as Quartermaster-General on Governor John Reynolds's staff. and he also served on the first board of commissioners of the Illinois and Michigan Canal.

One of Smith's daughters married Judge Jesse B. Thomas. Another daughter was courted by General James Semple, although Smith's rejection of Semple as a suitable suitor turned Semple, who would later serve on the Supreme Court with Smith, into a lifelong enemy.
