= Development Loan Fund =

The Development Loan Fund (DLF) was the lending arm of the United States International Cooperation Administration. It was established in 1957 as part of a revision of the Mutual Security Act. Its main purpose was extending loans to foreign nations, mostly for capital projects, repayable in the local currency of the borrower. In 1961, it merged into the United States Agency for International Development.

At its creation, its legislative mandate ordered that it not "compete" with "private investment capital", the Export-Import Bank or the International Bank for Reconstruction and Development.

== Shortcomings and limitations ==
The DLF was dominated by the Department of State because the chair of the Board for the Fund was the Under Secretary of State. This interfered with the ability of the DLF to impartially and independently evaluate and accept loan proposals. The 1960 report on the Operations of the DLF insisted that there was ongoing pressure on the Fund from the Department of State to dole out funds for political purposes. Furthermore, to keep it as an independent agency costed taxpayers around $2 million a year.

Approximately one quarter of all DLF funds in 1958 and 1959 went to India, about $195 million. Of this sum, $175 was earmarked, meaning that it was not restricted to use in any identifiable planned project and instead being used as a line of credit to India.

== Managers ==
- Dempster McIntosh (1957–1959)
- Vance Brand (1959–1961)

== See also ==
- Foreign Assistance Act
- Development aid
- Overseas Private Investment Corporation
- Foreign policy of the United States

== Further resources ==
- A.I.D. (January 1962). Terminal Report for the Development Loan Fund. Development Experience Clearinghouse; . Retrieved 8 February 2017.
