= John Barrett (diplomat) =

American diplomat (1866–1938)

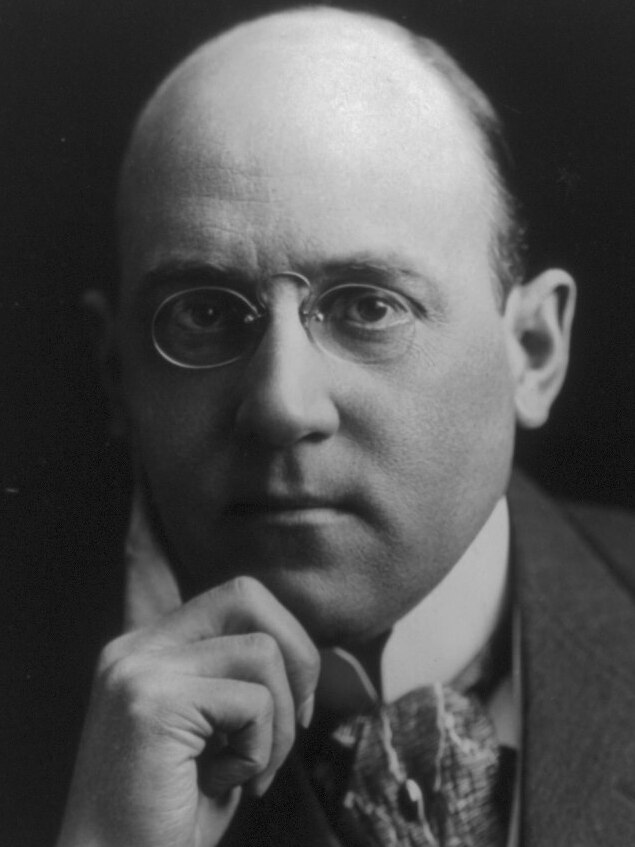

7th United States Minister to Colombia
- In office November 27, 1905 – September 24, 1906
- President: Theodore Roosevelt
- Preceded by: William W. Russell
- Succeeded by: Thomas C. Dawson

2nd United States Minister to Panama
- In office July 22, 1904 – May 13, 1905
- President: Theodore Roosevelt
- Preceded by: William I. Buchanan
- Succeeded by: Charles Edward Magoon

16th United States Minister to Argentina
- In office December 21, 1903 – April 27, 1904
- President: Theodore Roosevelt
- Preceded by: William Paine Lord
- Succeeded by: Arthur M. Beaupre

United States Consul General to Siam
- In office February 14, 1894 – April 26, 1898
- President: Grover Cleveland; William McKinley
- Preceded by: Sempronius H. Boyd
- Succeeded by: Hamilton King

Personal details
- Born: November 28, 1866 Grafton, Vermont, U.S.
- Died: October 17, 1938 (aged 71) Bellows Falls, Vermont, U.S.
- Spouse: Mary Tanner Candy
- Education: Dartmouth College (BA)
- Occupation: American diplomat

John Barrett (November 28, 1866 – October 17, 1938) was a United States diplomat and one of the most influential early directors general of the Pan American Union. On his death, the New York Times commented that he had "done more than any other person of his generation to promote closer relations among the American republics".

== Biography ==
Barrett was born in Grafton, Vermont on November 28, 1866. He graduated from Worcester Academy in 1883, then studied at both Vanderbilt University and Dartmouth College, eventually graduating from the latter with a Bachelor of Arts degree in 1889. From 1889 to 1894, he worked as a journalist on the west coast (especially Tacoma, Seattle, Portland, and San Francisco). While working as a journalist, he so impressed President Grover Cleveland during a meeting that he was appointed as the United States U.S. Minister to Siam (now Thailand). He served in that country for four years working to improve trade relations before returning to life as a journalist, working as a war correspondent during the Spanish–American War and then as a diplomatic adviser to Admiral George Dewey. (He would write a biography of Dewey in 1899.) Finally, he was appointed as a delegate to the second Pan-American Conference in 1901 through the following year.

In 1903, he was appointed as the Minister to Argentina, and though he only served in that position for one year, President Theodore Roosevelt later remarked that he had begun a "new United States-Argentine era". He was then appointed as Minister to Panama and then to Colombia.

In 1907, he was appointed at the first Director General of the Bureau of American Republics, an international organization that was renamed as the Pan American Union in 1910 (and subsequently reorganized in 1948 as the Organization of American States). He served in this capacity for fourteen years. During that period, he also founded the Pan-American Society of the United States, was Secretary General of 1916's Pan-American Scientific Congress, and presided over the Pan-American Commercial Congresses of 1911 and 1919.

In 1924, he briefly entered politics by running for the United States Senate as a Republican, but withdrew from the race before the election.

In his life, Barrett received honorary doctorates from Tulane University, the University of Southern California, the National University of Colombia in Bogotá, and the National University of Panama. He also received state decorations from Venezuela and China.

He died of pneumonia in 1938.

Diplomatic posts
Preceded by Sempronius H. Boyd	United States Minister to Siam; 1894–1898	Succeeded by Hamilton King
Preceded by William Paine Lord	United States Minister to Argentina; 21 December 1903 – 27 April 1904	Succeeded by Arthur M. Beaupre
Preceded by William I. Buchanan	United States Minister to Panama; July 22, 1904 – May 13, 1905	Succeeded by Charles Edward Magoon
Preceded by William W. Russell	United States Minister to Colombia; 27 November 1905 – 24 September 1906	Succeeded by Thomas C. Dawson
Preceded by none	Director General of the Pan-American Union; 1907–1921	Succeeded by Leo S. Rowe
