= Dempster McIntosh =

American businessman and diplomat (1896–1984)

The Honorable Dempster McIntosh
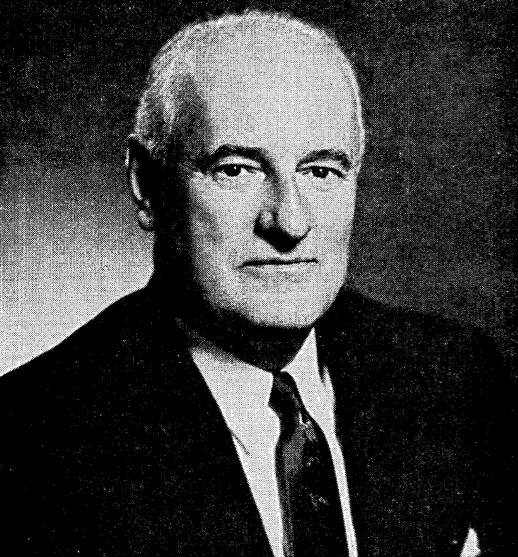

25th United States Ambassador to Colombia
- In office 30 July 1959 – 6 January 1961
- President: Dwight D. Eisenhower
- Preceded by: John M. Cabot
- Succeeded by: Fulton Freeman

39th United States Ambassador to Venezuela
- In office 26 April 1956 – 27 December 1957
- President: Dwight D. Eisenhower
- Preceded by: Fletcher Warren
- Succeeded by: Edward J. Sparks

27th United States Ambassador to Uruguay
- In office 12 November 1953 – 3 April 1956
- President: Dwight D. Eisenhower
- Preceded by: Edward L. Rodden
- Succeeded by: Jefferson Patterson

Personal details
- Born: 17 January 1896 Newport, Rhode Island
- Died: 6 May 1984 (age 88) Delray Beach, Florida
- Resting place: Rock Creek Cemetery, Washington, D.C.
- Spouse: Isabel Gordon McIntosh
- Children: 3
- Parent(s): George McIntosh & Susan Reid
- Education: University of Pittsburgh

Military service
- Branch/service: United States Army
- Rank: Second lieutenant

Dempster McIntosh (17 January 1896 – 6 May 1984) was an American business executive and diplomat, serving as the United States Ambassador to Uruguay, Venezuela, and Colombia. He was also the President of Philco from 1943 to 1953 and Manager of the Development Loan Fund of the International Cooperation Administration.

== Early life ==
Dempster McIntosh was born in Newport, Rhode Island, on 17 January 1896. At age seven, his family moved to Cotuit, Massachusetts, a small fishing village on Cape Cod, where his father was a gardener on the Rothwell estate. In those preadolescent years, he worked as a laborer in the summertime and was generally known as "a jovial figure." In 1908, the McIntoshes moved to Pittsburgh, Pennsylvania, where, at the age of 15, he stopped attending school and began working. However, Cotuit historian and biographer Albert Crocker Knight, author of McIntosh's biography, From Ocean View Avenue to Embassy Row, has often said that it was the village, with its bustling commerce, rather than Pittsburgh, that sparked Dempster's interest in business. Indeed, in an article titled by The Barnstable Patriot, Knight was quoted as bestowing McIntosh with the title of "Cotuit's own Horatio Alger." In 1915, after having dropped out of school for some years, he completed a Money and Banking course at the University of Pittsburgh.

== Career and diplomacy ==
During World War I, he served in the Army Quartermaster Corps as a second lieutenant. Following the war, McIntosh resumed his business career, dealing in exports. He eventually rose to the position of Vice President of American Steel Export Co., before being appointed President of Philco International Corporation, a now-defunct electronics manufacturer, in 1943. Now launched into considerable wealth, he and his family, which now contained three daughters, summered in Cotuit at The Pines, a luxury resort located in a historic mansion, which closed in 1958. During this time, his success in business was such that Philco continued its 13-year streak as the bestselling radio producer, and kept the lead until 1950. Later, he became the Director of the Export Manager Club of New York.

In 1953, McIntosh first came into contact with the political elite through his friend and mentor, Pennsylvania Senator James H. Duff, who introduced him to Secretary of State John Foster Dulles and C. Douglas Dillon, a diplomat and New Jersey campaign manager for President Dwight D. Eisenhower. Those connections having been fruitful, Dulles and Dillon then introduced McIntosh to Eisenhower himself, who, recognizing the businessman's travel experience, requested he become an ambassador. McIntosh agreed, left Philco, and was appointed the 27th Ambassador to Uruguay 26 September 1953. He was presented with credentials 12 November 1953, and served for three years.

On 3 April 1956, McIntosh left his first ambassadorial position after President Eisenhower appointed him 39th Ambassador to Venezuela on 28 March 1956. Receiving his credentials on 26 April of the same year, his time spent in Venezuela was spent dealing with dictators and making sure Venezuelan oil kept flowing into American markets. Indeed, McIntosh was quoted, while speaking about the Venezuelan political climate, as saying: "in the absence of democratic tradition, the majority of Venezuelans have developed what appears to be an apathetic or acquiescent attitude towards their authoritarian government." At that time, close to half of all oil imported to the United States came from Venezuela. On 27 December 1957, after about a year and a half, McIntosh left the position and returned to the United States, where he served for a year as the first Manager of the Development Loan Fund of the International Cooperation Administration in Washington, D.C.

Having handled the unpredictable political climate in Venezuela, President Eisenhower appointed Mcintosh 18 June 1959 the 25th Ambassador to Colombia. He was presented with credentials 30 July 1959, and served until 6 January 1961, when he retired at the age of 64.

On 6 May 1984, Dempster McIntosh died at the age of 88 in Delray Beach, Florida, where he was living in retirement.

Diplomatic posts
Preceded by Edward L. Rodden	United States Ambassador to Uruguay; 1953–1956	Succeeded by Jefferson Patterson
Preceded by Fletcher Warren	United States Ambassador to Venezuela; 1956–1957	Succeeded by Edward J. Sparks
Preceded by John M. Cabot	United States Ambassador to Colombia; 1959–1961	Succeeded by Fulton Freeman
