= James S. Green =

American politician (1817–1870)

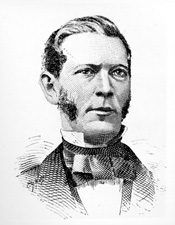
- Early sketch of the Senator

United States Senator from Missouri
- In office January 12, 1857 – March 3, 1861
- Preceded by: David Rice Atchison
- Succeeded by: Waldo P. Johnson

7th Chargé d'Affaire to New Granada
- In office December 19, 1853 – August 13, 1854
- President: Franklin Pierce
- Preceded by: Yelverton P. King
- Succeeded by: James B. Bowlin

Member of the U.S. House of Representatives from Missouri's 3rd district
- In office March 4, 1847 – March 3, 1851
- Preceded by: James Hugh Relfe
- Succeeded by: John G. Miller

Personal details
- Born: James Stephen Green; February 28, 1817 Rectortown, Virginia, U.S.
- Died: January 19, 1870 (aged 52) St. Louis, Missouri, U.S.
- Resting place: Forest Grove Cemetery, Canton, Missouri
- Party: Democratic
- Relations: Martin E. Green (brother)
- Occupation: Politician
- Profession: Law
- Committees: Committee on Territories

James Stephen Green (February 28, 1817 – January 19, 1870) was a Democratic United States Representative and Senator from Missouri.

== Early life and education ==
Born near Rectortown in Fauquier County, Virginia, he attended the common schools and moved first to Alabama, and later to Missouri around 1838. He studied law, was admitted to the Bar in 1840, and commenced practice in Monticello, Missouri, and later Canton, Missouri, a short distance away.

== Family ==
His brother, Martin E. Green, became a Confederate brigadier general during the American Civil War.

== Political career ==
Green was a delegate to the State constitutional convention in 1845 and was elected as a Democrat to the 30th and 31st Congresses, serving from March 4, 1847, to March 3, 1851. He was not a candidate for renomination in 1850, and was subsequently Chargé d'Affaires to New Granada in 1853–1854.

He was appointed Minister Resident in June 1854, but did not present his credentials; he was elected to the 35th Congress, but did not take his seat, having been elected to the U.S. Senate to fill a vacancy during the term commencing March 4, 1855, where he served from January 12, 1857, to March 3, 1861. While in the Senate, he was chairman of the Committee on Territories during the 35th and 36th Congresses.

== Death ==
Green died in St. Louis, Missouri on January 19, 1870. He is buried in the Forest Grove Cemetery in Canton. He is the namesake of the community of Greensburg, Missouri.

Political offices
Preceded by (none)	Member of the U.S. House of Representatives from Missouri's 3rd congressional district March 4, 1847 – March 3, 1851	Succeeded by John G. Miller
Preceded by David R. Atchison	U.S. senator (Class 3) from Missouri; January 12, 1857 – March 3, 1861; Served alongside: Henry S. Geyer and Trusten Polk	Succeeded by Waldo P. Johnson
Diplomatic posts
Preceded by Yelverton P. King	United States Minister to New Granada; May 24, 1853 – August 13, 1854	Succeeded by James B. Bowlin
