= William W. Russell =

American diplomat

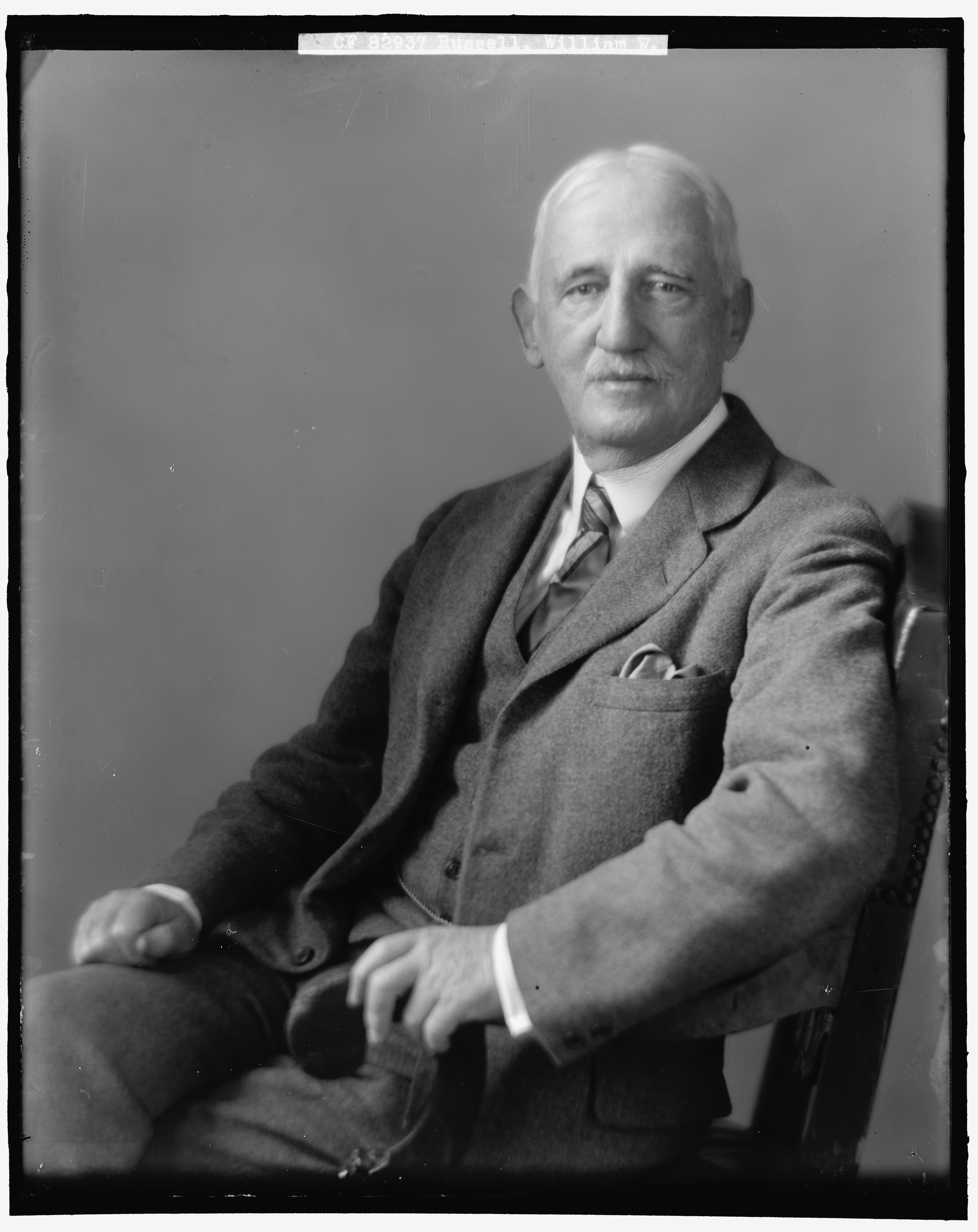
- Photograph of Russell, 1905, by Harris & Ewing, Library of Congress

United States Minister to Siam
- In office January 9, 1926 – January 7, 1927
- President: Calvin Coolidge
- Preceded by: Edward E. Brodie
- Succeeded by: Harold Orville MacKenzie

United States Minister to the Dominican Republic
- In office October 7, 1915 – September 12, 1925
- President: Woodrow Wilson; Warren G. Harding; Calvin Coolidge
- Preceded by: James Mark Sullivan
- Succeeded by: Evan E. Young
- In office November 3, 1910 – March 2, 1913
- President: William Howard Taft
- Preceded by: Horace G. Knowles
- Succeeded by: James Mark Sullivan

United States Minister to Venezuela
- In office August 22, 1905 – March 24, 1910
- President: Theodore Roosevelt; William Howard Taft
- Preceded by: Herbert W. Bowen
- Succeeded by: John W. Garrett

U.S. Minister to Colombia
- In office December 9, 1904 – May 24, 1905
- President: Theodore Roosevelt
- Preceded by: Arthur M. Beaupre
- Succeeded by: John Barrett

Personal details
- Born: William Worthington Russell Jr. December 3, 1858 Washington County, D.C.
- Died: March 11, 1944 (aged 85) Washington, D.C.
- Spouse: Grace Campbell Lidstone (m. 1905)
- Relations: William Worthington Russell (father); John Henry Russell]] (uncle); John H. Russell Jr. (cousin)
- Children: 3
- Education: U.S. Naval Academy
- Awards: Legion of Honour

William Worthington Russell Jr. (December 3, 1858 – March 11, 1944) was an American diplomat who served under five presidents.

== Early life ==
Russell was born on December 3, 1858, in Washington, D.C. He was a son of Maj. William Worthington Russell (1821–1862), once Paymaster of the Marine Corps, and Virginia (née Fletcher) Russell of Alexandria, Virginia. His two sisters were Virginia Russell (wife of John Buchanan Brewer) and Lucy Briscoe Russell.

His paternal grandparents were Robert Grier Russell (brother of U.S. Representative from Pennsylvania James McPherson Russell, both being sons of lawyer and Revolutionary War soldier Alexander Russell) and Susan Hood (née Worthington) Russell. His father was a first cousin of U.S. Representative Samuel Lyon Russell. Among his paternal uncles were Admiral Alexander Wilson Russell and Rear Admiral John Henry Russell and his first cousin was Maj.-Gen. John H. Russell Jr. (father of Brooke Astor).

He attended the Rockville Academy in Rockville, Maryland and the U.S. Naval Academy, graduating in 1881. He later studied engineering and was in the railroad business before entering the diplomatic service.

== Career ==
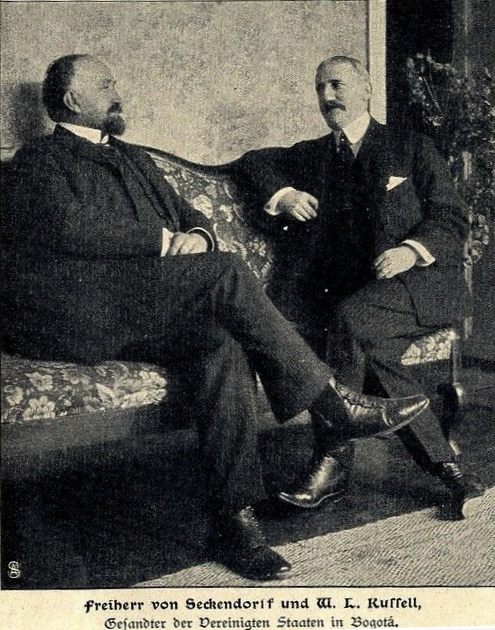
Baron Edwin von Seckendorff Russell, in Bogotá, Colombia, 1905

Russell was connected with several surveys of railroad routes in South America, Mexico and the United States and was an assistant engineer in locating the route of the Eads ship-railway across the Isthmus of Tehuantepec. He also served as senior watch officer of the Brazilian cruiser America, which was delivered at the time of the Melo revolution in 1893.

=== Diplomatic career ===
In 1895, he was appointed secretary of the American legation at Caracas in Venezuela, serving until 1904 when he was appointed secretary of the legation and chargé d'affaires ad interim at Panama City (following its separation from Colombia in 1903). On March 17, 1904, Russell was appointed by President Theodore Roosevelt as the U.S. Envoy Extraordinary and Minister Plenipotentiary to Colombia. He presented his credentials on December 9, 1904, and served until he left his post on May 24, 1905, when "he was summoned to Washington as a witness in the investigation of the charges preferred by Herbert W. Bowen, Minister to Venezuela, against Assistant Secretary of State Loomis."

On June 21, 1905, President Roosevelt appointed him U.S. Envoy Extraordinary and Minister Plenipotentiary to Venezuela and he was commissioned during a recess of the U.S. Senate. He was recommissioned on December 11, 1905, after confirmation. Russell was recalled on March 8, 1908. Jacob Sleeper, who was serving as chargé d'Affaires ad interim, notified the Government of Venezuela that the United States had severed diplomatic relations with Venezuela on June 20, 1908. From August 1908 to January 1909, he was commissioner to the National Ecuadorian Exposition at Quito. On March 15, 1909, when diplomatic relations were re-established, Russell presented new credentials and served until he left his post on March 24, 1910.

On June 24, 1910, he was appointed by President William Howard Taft as the Minister Resident/Consul General to the Dominican Republic and presented his credentials on November 3, 1910. On September 5, 1911, he was promoted to Envoy Extraordinary and Plenipotentiary to the Dominican Republic and presented his credentials the same day. Russell left his post on March 2, 1913, and was succeeded by James Mark Sullivan until President Woodrow Wilson reappointed Russell to the post on August 16, 1915. He was commissioned during a recess of the Senate and presented his credentials on October 7, 1915, before being recommissioned on December 17, 1915, after confirmation. Russell left his post on September 12, 1925.

On September 28, 1925, he received his final diplomatic appointment from President Calvin Coolidge as U.S. Envoy Extraordinary and Minister Plenipotentiary to Siam (Thailand). He was commissioned during a recess of the Senate and recommissioned on December 17, 1925, after confirmation. He was officially received on January 9, 1926, and served until his retirement, when he left his post on January 7, 1927.

Russell was awarded the Legion of Honour by the French government in 1907 for handling French interests in Venezuela. He was also honored by the Venezuelan government for his service to the country.

== Personal life ==
On May 24, 1905, Russell was married to Grace Campbell Lidstone, a daughter of James M. Lidstone of London, England. Together, they were the parents of three children, William Worthington Russell III (1910–1992), Lidstone Campbell Russell (1915–1964), and Virginia A. Russell.

Russell died at 2900 Connecticut Avenue, his home in Washington, D.C., on March 11, 1944. After a funeral at St. Alban's Church, he was interred at Congressional Cemetery in Washington. His widow died in 1969.

Diplomatic posts
Preceded by Arthur M. Beaupre	United States Minister to Colombia; December 9, 1904 – May 25, 1905	Succeeded by John Barrett
Preceded by Herbert W. Bowen	United States Minister to Venezuela; August 22, 1905 – March 24, 1910	Succeeded by John W. Garrett
Preceded by Horace G. Knowles	United States Minister to the Dominican Republic; November 3, 1910 – March 2, 1913	Succeeded by James Mark Sullivan
Preceded by James Mark Sullivan	United States Minister to the Dominican Republic; October 7, 1915 – September 12, 1925	Succeeded by Evan E. Young
Preceded by Edward E. Brodie	United States Minister to Siam; January 9, 1926 – January 7, 1927	Succeeded by Harold Orville MacKenzie
