= Beaufort Taylor Watts =

American politician

Beaufort Taylor Watts (April 10, 1789 – 1869) was an American diplomat and politician from South Carolina. He served as the Secretary of the U.S. Legation to Colombia from 1824 to 1826, Chargé d'affaires to Colombia from 1826 to 1827, and Secretary of Legation to Russia from 1828 to 1829. He then served as secretary to the Governor of South Carolina from 1834 to 1861. He also served as a representative in the South Carolina General Assembly.

Watts was born in or near Laurens, South Carolina in 1789 to Captain John and Margaret Martha (Pollard) Watts, and graduated from South Carolina College in 1812.
