= Rudolf E. Schoenfeld =

American diplomat

Rudolf Emil Schoenfeld (1895-April 15, 1981) was the United States Ambassador to Romania (1947 to 1950), Guatemala (1950 to 1953) and Colombia (1954 to 1955). During World War II, he served in London as the United States representative to the governments exiled from their countries by the Nazis.

He was Chargé d'Affaires ad interim to Norway (Made initial call as Chargé d'Affaires on August 2, 1940). As Chargé d'Affaires ad interim to Belgium, the initial call made on August 15, 1940. Schoenfeld established the Legation near the Government of the Netherlands in the United Kingdom. As Chargé d'Affaires ad interim to Luxembourg, Schoenfeld served near the Government of Luxembourg established in the United Kingdom.

Schoenfeld was a native of Washington and graduated from George Washington University in 1915. He earned a Ph.D. degree from the University of Berne while serving as deputy consul there.
