= William M. Blackford =

American lawyer

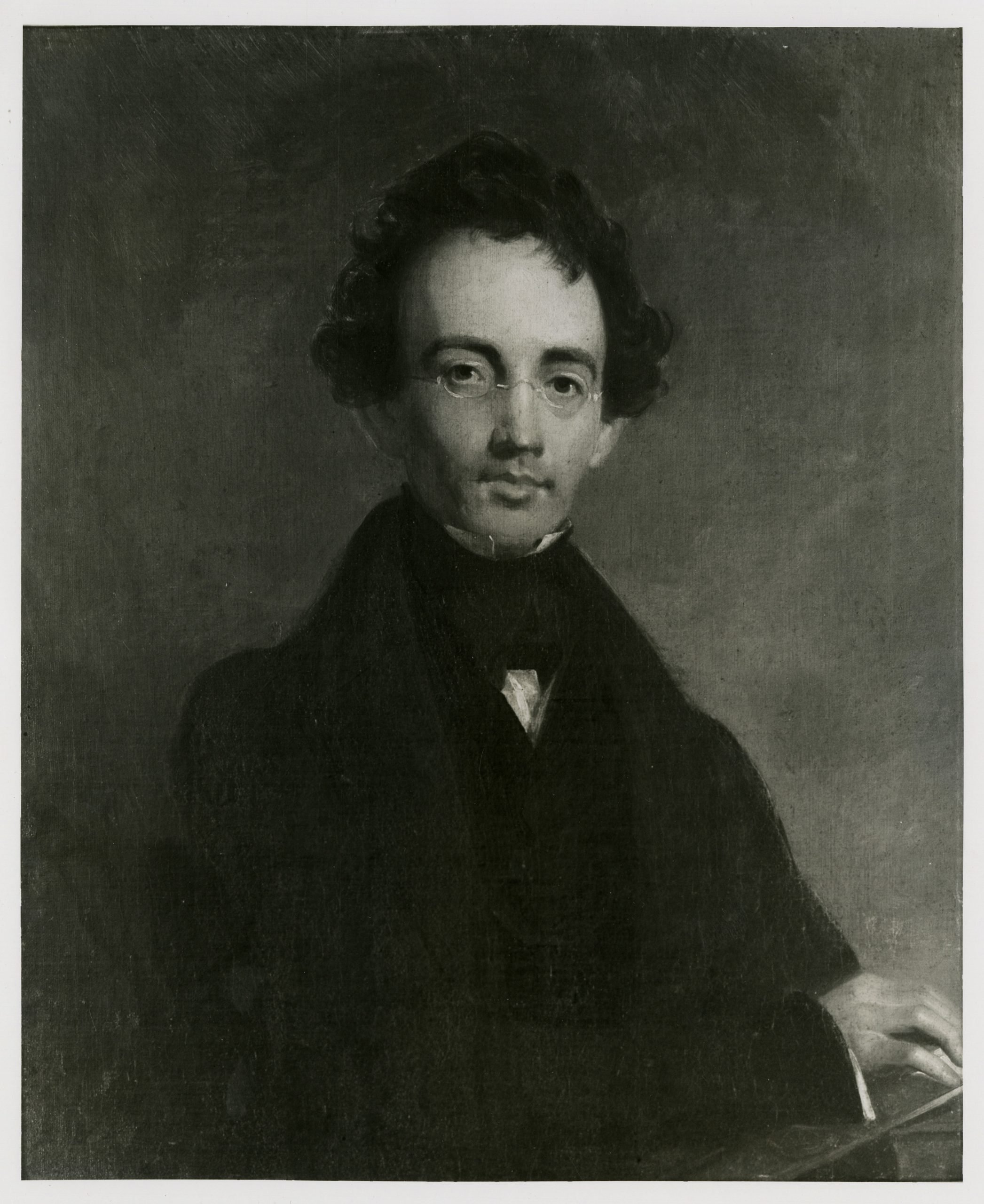
- portrait by Emanuel Leutze
- Born: August 19, 1801; Catoctin Furnace
- Died: April 1864 (aged 62–63); Lynchburg
- Spouse(s): Mary Berkeley Minor Blackford

William Mathews Blackford (August 19, 1801, Catoctin Furnace, Maryland – April 15, 1864 at home in Lynchburg, Virginia) was a journalist and American chargé d'affaires to the Republic of New Granada, based in Bogota, where he helped to negotiate a new postal treaty.

== Biography ==
In January 1825, Blackford moved to Fredericksburg, Virginia to practice law. He married Mary Berkeley Minor on October 12, 1825. From 1828 to 1841 he owned the Fredericksburg Political Arena and Literary Messenger.

== New Granada ==
The United States had claims against New Granada as a result of the seizure of ships and cargo during various wars of independence in South America. Blackford and his son William Willis Blackford tried to settle those claims but realized they would not be able to do so unless the US instituted a naval blockade. He was able to negotiate a commercial treaty but as it did not end discriminatory duties, the United States Senate never ratified it.
