= List of Chi Psi members =

The following is a list of notable Chi Psi members.

== Academia and museology ==
- Stephen Ambrose, historian, author, and professor of history at the University of New Orleans
- Robert Burwell Fulton, seventh chancellor of the University of Mississippi
- William Miller Collier, President of George Washington University, United States Ambassador to Spain, United States Ambassador to Chile
- Kirk Johnson, paleontologist, author, curator, museum administrator, and Sant Director of Smithsonian's National Museum of Natural History

== Art and architecture ==
- Temple Hoyne Buell, architect
- Charles Luckman, architect of Madison Square Garden, among other projects

== Business ==
- James Ford Bell, founder of General Mills
- Mark Bingham, public relations executive and one of the members of Flight 93 credited with trying to thwart the September 11, 2001 terrorist attacks by overpowering the hijackers.
- Clarence Birdseye, inventor of frozen food products
- Daniel Burke, former president and Chairman of the RT French Company (i.e., "French's Mustard")
- Steve Culbertson, President and CEO, Youth Service America
- Robert Hugh Daniel, founder of Daniel International Corporation
- David Gardner, founder of The Motley Fool
- Richard Jenrette, founder of Donaldson, Lufkin & Jenrette
- Herbert Fisk Johnson Jr. – Former President of S.C. Johnson & Son
- Samuel Curtis Johnson Jr. – chairman and chief executive officer of S.C. Johnson & Son (1967–1988)
- Herbert Fisk Johnson III – Current Chairman and chief executive officer of S.C. Johnson & Son
- Edmund C. Lynch Jr., son to co-founder of financial services firm Merrill Lynch
- Paul Mellon, banker, philanthropist, and thoroughbred racehorse owner
- Charles Edward Merrill, co-founder of financial services firm Merrill Lynch
- John Sargent Pillsbury Sr., businessman and industrialist known for his role as CEO at Pillsbury Company
- Rufus Rand, president of the Minneapolis Gas Company
- Kemmons Wilson, founder of the Holiday Inn chain of hotels

== Clergy ==
- Joshua Young, D.D. (1823–1904), Unitarian minister of national renown, abolitionist

== Entertainment ==
- Eddie Albert, actor known for his role on Green Acres
- Buddy Ebsen, actor known for The Beverly Hillbillies and Barnaby Jones
- John Gavin, actor, president of the Screen Actors Guild, and United States Ambassador to Mexico
- Paul Lieberstein, actor best known for his role on the American version of The Office
- Jerry Mathers (Delta Delta, 1977) actor best known for his role on Leave It to Beaver
- Steve Miller, musician known for the Steve Miller Band
- Boz Scaggs, musician
- Fred Weller, movie, television, and stage actor
- Van Earl Wright, sportscaster

== Government ==
- Richard Helms, 8th Director of the Central Intelligence Agency
- Stansfield Turner, 12th Director of the Central Intelligence Agency and United States Navy Admiral

== Law ==
- Albert S. Bard, lawyer and civic activist, 4th president of Chi Psi
- Melville Fuller, 8th Chief Justice of the United States
- William Henry Gates Sr., attorney, philanthropist, and father of Microsoft founder Bill Gates
- Elbridge Thomas Gerry, lawyer, reformer, and second president of Chi Psi
- Randolph D. Moss, former United States Assistant Attorney General for the Office of Legal Counsel; established the legal justification for the targeted killing of terrorist leaders in foreign lands.
- Thomas Tongue, Associate Justice of the Oregon Supreme Court

== Literature and journalism ==
- Stephen Ambrose, historian, author, and professor of history at the University of New Orleans
- Taylor Branch, magazine editor and author of the Pulitzer Prize winning trilogy chronicling the life of Martin Luther King
- Lee Hawkins, author, journalist, musician
- Kenneth Roberts, historical novelist
- Clinton Scollard, poet and writer of fiction in the late 1800s and early 1900s.
- Richard Wilbur, poet, two-time recipient of the Pulitzer Prize for Poetry

== Military ==
- Captain Morris Brown Jr., Medal of Honor recipient
- James Chatham Duane, United States Army Brigadier General, one of Chi Psi's national founders; US Army Corps of Engineers Chief of Engineers from October 1886, to June 1888
- Ross T. Dwyer, United States Marine Corps Major General
- Daniel W. Hand, U.S. Army brigadier general
- Robert E. Kelley, United States Air Force General and former Superintendent of the United States Air Force Academy
- George E. Leach, major general in the United States Army and two-time Republican Mayor of Minneapolis
- Henry Martyn Porter, Colonel in the Vermont Infantry and Provost Marshal for the city of New Orleans
- Philip Spencer, a Chi Psi national founder and the center of the alleged incident of mutiny aboard the USS Somers; hanged at sea without a court-martial.
- Stansfield Turner, United States Navy Admiral and director of the Central Intelligence Agency

== Politics ==
- Albert II, Prince of Monaco
- Nicholas F. Brady, United States Secretary of the Treasury
- Horatio C. Burchard, United States Congressman from Illinois, 13th Director of the United States Mint, and father of the Consumer Price Index (CPI).
- Arne Carlson, 37th Governor of Minnesota
- Sean Casten, United States Congressman from Illinois
- William Miller Collier, United States Ambassador to Spain, United States Ambassador to Chile, and the president of George Washington University.
- Roy A. Cooper, North Carolina Attorney General and later Governor of North Carolina
- Jim Cooper, United States Congressman from Tennessee
- Orville Freeman, 29th Governor of Minnesota
- John Gavin, United States Ambassador to Mexico, actor, and president of the Screen Actors Guild
- H. John Heinz III, United States Senator from Pennsylvania
- John Newton Hungerford, United States Congressman from New York
- Richard Lamm, Governor of Colorado
- Julius Sterling Morton, 3rd Secretary of the United States Department of Agriculture
- William Proxmire, United States Senator from Wisconsin
- Thomas Brackett Reed, 36th and 38th Speaker of the United States House of Representatives
- William Scranton, Governor of Pennsylvania and 38th United States Ambassador to the United Nations
- Edward S. Walker Jr., former U.S. Ambassador to Israel, Egypt, and the UAE; Assistant Secretary of State for Near Eastern Affairs.

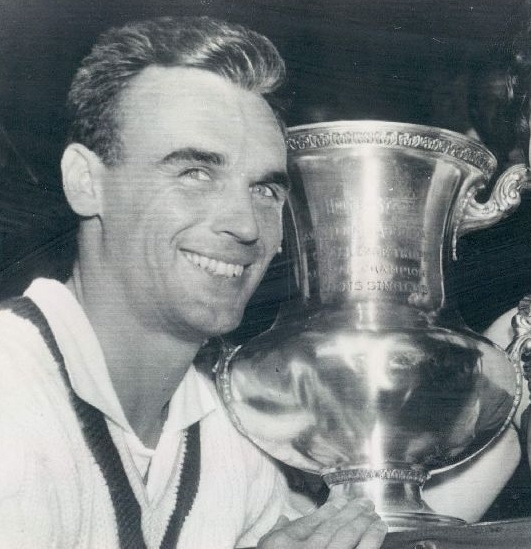
Vic Seixas

== Sports ==
- Bill Belichick, National Football League Head Coach, New England Patriots
- Buzz Calkins, IRL driver
- Russ Francis, National Football League tight end, New England Patriots and San Francisco 49ers, 3-time Pro-Bowler
- Buckshot Jones, NASCAR driver
- Waite Hoyt, New York Yankees pitcher, Major League Baseball Hall of Famer
- Edwin W. Lee, college football player and coach, attorney, state court judge
- Eric Mangini, National Football League Head Coach, Cleveland Browns
- Hugh McElhenny, NFL running back, Hall of Famer
- Rob Oppenheim, PGA TOUR professional golfer
- Augie Pabst III, race car driver
- Vic Seixas, professional tennis player, Davis Cup winner
- Paul Arthur Sorg, famous horseman of the early 1900s, multi-millionaire, banker, paper mfg.
- Lake Speed, stock car racing driver
- Jeff Torborg, Major League Baseball catcher and manager
- Michael Busa, National Football League Quarterback and Bench Warmer
