= The new black =

"The new black" may be a reference to a phrase such as "pink is the new black", which has been newly coined as a snowclone.

The new black or new black may refer to:

- The New Black, an album by Canadian heavy metal band Strapping Young Lad
- "The New Black", a song by American band Every Time I Die from their album Gutter Phenomenon
- "New Black Overclass" ("NEWBO"), a term coined by Lee Hawkins to describe a young generation of wealthy and business-savvy African-American celebrities
- The Harlem Renaissance, a 1920s cultural, social, and artistic movement that was also known as the New Negro Movement
- Orange Is the New Black, a Netflix original series
- "The New Black Aesthetic", a 1989 essay by Trey Ellis
- "The New Black" the working title for AM by Arctic Monkeys
- "The New Black", episode of season 4 of The Boondocks
- "The New Black" or "Shababnikim", a TV series
