= Bernadette Meehan =

American diplomat and CEO

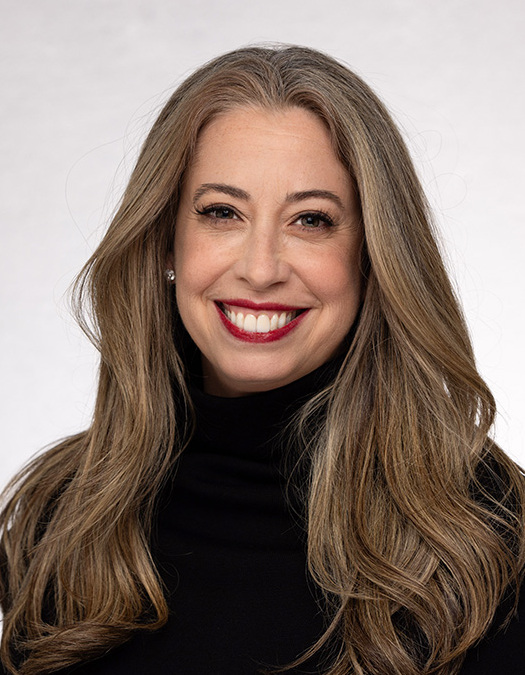
- Meehan in December 2025

United States Ambassador to Chile
- In office September 30, 2022 – January 20, 2025
- President: Joe Biden
- Preceded by: Carol Z. Perez
- Succeeded by: Brandon Judd

Chief Executive Officer of the Wikimedia Foundation
- Incumbent
- Assumed office January 20, 2026
- Preceded by: Maryana Iskander

Spokesperson for the United States National Security Council
- In office October 2014 – June 2015
- President: Barack Obama

Personal details
- Born: The Bronx, New York, U.S.
- Spouse: Evan S. Medeiros
- Education: Boston College (BA)

Bernadette M. Meehan (/ˈmiːən/) is an American diplomat who was the United States ambassador to Chile from 2022 to 2025. She has been the chief executive officer (CEO) of the Wikimedia Foundation since January 20, 2026.

== Early life and education ==
Meehan was born in The Bronx, raised in Pleasantville, New York, and graduated from Kennedy Catholic High School in Somers, New York in 1993. At 16, she moved to Río Gallegos, Argentina, as a high school exchange student. She graduated from Boston College with a bachelor's degree in political science.

== Career ==
After graduation, she worked on Wall Street, including as a vice president of Private Banking at JPMorgan Chase and then as a Vice President of Asset Management at Lehman Brothers. She joined the United States Foreign Service in 2004.

Meehan joined the United States Department of State as a Foreign Service officer in 2004, and began her new career as a consular officer at the U.S. Embassy in Bogotá, Colombia. In 2010, she returned to Washington, D.C., to work as a State Department "line officer", advancing Secretary of State Hillary Clinton's overseas travel. She then became special assistant to Clinton. She had also served in Dubai and Iraq. From 2012 to 2015, Meehan was the spokesperson for the White House National Security Council (NSC). In 2015, Meehan become dean and Virginia Rusk fellow at Georgetown University's Institute for the Study of Diplomacy in the Edmund A. Walsh School of Foreign Service.

In March 2016, Meehan was recruited by Ben Rhodes to help plan Barack Obama's visit to Cuba. She worked as a senior advisor at the NSC from January 2016 to January 2017. In February 2017, Meehan left the Foreign Service for the Obama Foundation, where she served as the executive director of International Programs, Chief International Officer, and then executive vice president of Global Programs.

=== United States ambassador to Chile ===
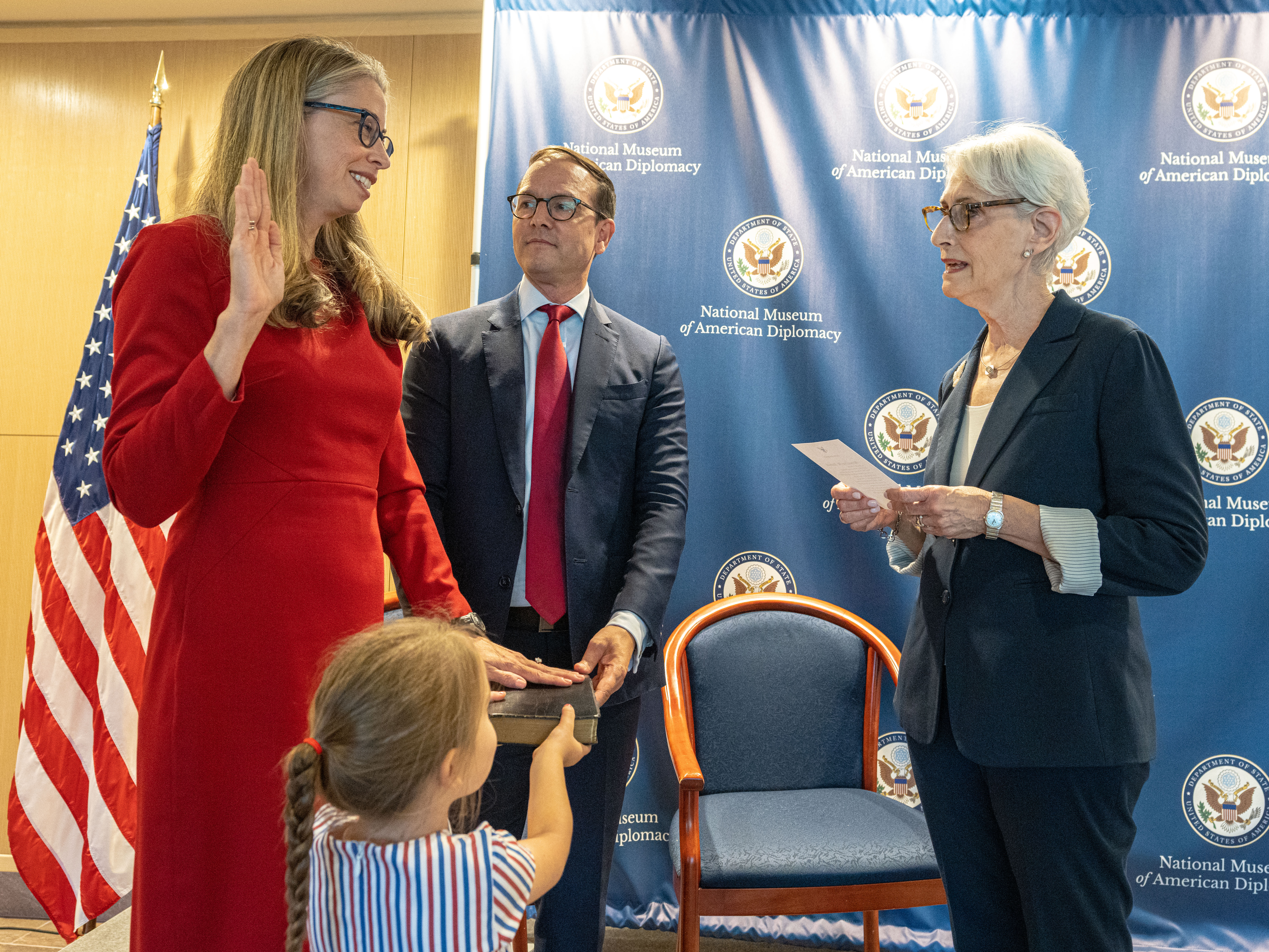
Meehan sworn in as ambassador to Chile in 2022 by Deputy Secretary of State Wendy Sherman

On July 9, 2021, President Joe Biden nominated Meehan to be the next United States ambassador to Chile. Hearings on her nomination were held before the Senate Foreign Relations Committee on March 15, 2022. The committee favorably reported her nomination on May 18, 2022. On July 20, 2022, the United States Senate confirmed her nomination by a 51–44 vote. She was sworn in on August 29, 2022, and presented her credentials to President Gabriel Boric on September 30, 2022. Following the re-election of Donald Trump as president, Meehan submitted her resignation as ambassador effective January 10, 2025, following tradition for political appointees of both parties.

=== Post-ambassadorial career ===
On December 9, 2025, Meehan was appointed CEO of the Wikimedia Foundation. She assumed the role on January 20, 2026, succeeding Maryana Iskander. The New York Times described her as fitting in with the non-flashy image of Wikipedians.

== Personal life ==
Meehan speaks English, Spanish, and Arabic. She is married to Evan S. Medeiros, the Penner Family Chair in Asian Studies at Georgetown University's Walsh School of Foreign Service.

Diplomatic posts
Preceded by Carol Z. Perez	United States Ambassador to Chile; 2022–2025	Succeeded by Brandon Judd
