= Henry P. Fletcher =

American diplomat (1873–1959)

Henry Fletcher
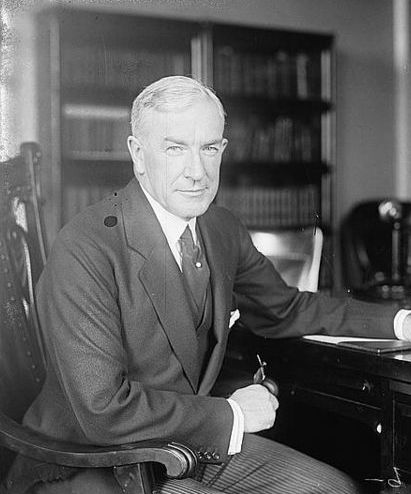
- Fletcher in 1921

Chair of the Republican National Committee
- In office June 7, 1934 – June 22, 1936
- Preceded by: Everett Sanders
- Succeeded by: John Hamilton

United States Ambassador to Italy
- In office April 2, 1924 – August 3, 1929
- President: Herbert Hoover; Calvin Coolidge
- Preceded by: Richard Child
- Succeeded by: John Garrett

United States Ambassador to Luxembourg
- In office October 29, 1923 – March 25, 1924
- President: Calvin Coolidge
- Preceded by: William Phillips
- Succeeded by: William Phillips

United States Ambassador to Belgium
- In office May 3, 1922 – March 25, 1924
- President: Calvin Coolidge; Warren G. Harding
- Preceded by: Brand Whitlock
- Succeeded by: William Phillips

3rd United States Under Secretary of State
- In office March 8, 1921 – March 6, 1922
- President: Warren G. Harding
- Preceded by: Norman Davis
- Succeeded by: William Phillips

United States Ambassador to Mexico
- In office March 3, 1917 – January 25, 1919
- President: Woodrow Wilson
- Preceded by: Henry Wilson
- Succeeded by: Charles B. Warren

United States Ambassador to Chile
- In office September 9, 1910 – March 9, 1916
- President: William Howard Taft
- Preceded by: Thomas Dawson (Minister)
- Succeeded by: Joseph Shea

Personal details
- Born: Henry Prather Fletcher; April 10, 1873 Greencastle, Pennsylvania, U.S.
- Died: July 10, 1959 (aged 86) Newport, Rhode Island, U.S.
- Resting place: Arlington National Cemetery
- Spouse: Beatrice Bend (m. 1917; died 1941)

Military service
- Allegiance: United States
- Branch/service: United States Army
- Rank: Lieutenant
- Unit: 1st United States Volunteer Cavalry
- Battles/wars: Spanish-American War

Henry Prather Fletcher (April 10, 1873 – July 10, 1959) was an American diplomat who served under six presidents.

== Early life ==
Fletcher was born in Greencastle, Pennsylvania, in 1873 to Louis Henry Fletcher and Martha Ellen (née Rowe) Fletcher. His siblings included James Gilmore Fletcher (1875–1960), David Watson Fletcher (1880–1957) and Florence Fletcher (1883–1957). He was the fourth cousin once removed of William McKinley.

Fletcher planned to attend Princeton University, but his family could not afford to send him, therefore, he studied law and shorthand in his uncle's law office.

Shortly after beginning to practice law, the Spanish–American War broke out and the United States declared war on Spain in 1898. Fletcher joined Theodore Roosevelt's Rough Riders as a private in Troop K. He served in the U.S. Army, both in Cuba and in the Philippines for two years.

== Career ==
After returning from the Philippines, he entered the diplomatic service under President Roosevelt's administration as secondary secretary of the United States legation in Havana, Cuba. In 1903, he was transferred to Beiping and then, in 1905, as secretary to the legation in Lisbon, Portugal. In 1907, he returned to China and negotiated an agreement whereby US capital was allowed to participate on equal terms with European capital for the first time.

As a reward, President William Howard Taft named him US Minister to Chile in 1909. He was in that position until 1914, by which time the mission had been raised to the status of an Embassy, making him the first United States Ambassador to Chile. He served in that role until March 9, 1916.

In 1916, President Woodrow Wilson appointed him United States Ambassador to Mexico, his term coinciding with the height of World War I. On January 19, 1917, the German Secretary of State, Arthur Zimmermann, sent a message to Mexico promising Texas, New Mexico and Arizona to Mexico if it entered the War on German's side. The note was intercepted in Washington and made public and is considered one of the immediate causes for the United States entering the war six weeks later. He presented his credentials on March 3, 1917, and served as ambassador in Mexico until January 25, 1919, when he returned to the United States.

In 1920, after directing the State Department's Latin American affairs for a year, he resigned and was appointed Under Secretary of State by President Warren G. Harding, serving from March 8, 1921, to March 6, 1922, under Secretary Charles Evans Hughes.

Thereafter, he served as ambassador to Belgium from 1922 until 1924 under both Harding and his successor, Calvin Coolidge, who became president after Harding's death in 1923. In 1923, he was sent to the Pan-American Conference in Santiago, taking the place of Secretary of State Charles Evans Hughes, who had declined to go. At that time, the United States Secretary of State was ex officio chair of the Pan-American Conference, although that changed in Santiago after Latin American criticism.

From April 2, 1924, to August 3, 1929, he was appointed by Coolidge and served as the Ambassador to Italy. He was on close terms with the Italian dictator, Benito Mussolini.

=== Later career ===
On April 22, 1930, President Hoover appointed him chairman of the United States Tariff Commission after the Tariff Act of 1930. He was said to have accomplished more work in one year than what had been done in the previous seven.

From 1934 to 1936, he was the chairman of the Republican Party and was a delegate to the Republican national conventions in 1936 and 1940.

== Personal life ==
In 1917, he married Beatrice Bend (1874–1941), a daughter of George H. Bend, a member of the New York Stock Exchange who had gone bankrupt. Bend's sister, Amy Bend (1870–1957), was married to Cortlandt F. Bishop in 1899. Henry and Beatrice did not have any children.

He died in 1959 at his home in Newport, Rhode Island, and is buried in Arlington National Cemetery. He left an estate worth $3,000,000, and donated his personal papers to the Library of Congress. He also left a portrait of George Washington, by Edward Savage, to the National Gallery in Washington, D.C.

== Honours ==
- 1929: Grand Cordon of the Order of Leopold.

Diplomatic posts
Preceded by Thomas Dawson	United States Ambassador to Chile; 1910–1916	Succeeded by Joseph Shea
Preceded by Henry Wilson	United States Ambassador to Mexico; 1917–1919	Succeeded by Charles B. Warren
Preceded by Norman Davis	United States Under Secretary of State; 1921–1922	Succeeded by William Phillips
Preceded by Brand Whitlock	United States Ambassador to Belgium; 1922–1924	Succeeded by William Phillips
Preceded by William Phillips	United States Ambassador to Luxembourg; 1923–1924	Succeeded by William Phillips
Preceded by Richard Child	United States Ambassador to Italy; 1924–1929	Succeeded by John Garrett
Party political offices
Preceded by Everett Sanders	Chair of the Republican National Committee; 1934–1936	Succeeded by John Hamilton
