= John F. Kennedy Catholic Preparatory School =

Location
- 54 Route 138; Somers, (Westchester County), New York 10589; United States; 41.303°N 73.689°W

Information
- Former names: St. Mary's School; John F. Kennedy Catholic High School
- Type: Private, co-educational
- Motto: Courage and Compassion
- Religious affiliation: Roman Catholic
- Established: 1924 (102 years ago) as St. Mary's School; 1966 (60 years ago) as John F. Kennedy Catholic High School
- School code: NCES School ID: 00920753
- CEEB code: 332650
- President: Fr. Mark Vaillancourt
- Principal: Gregory Viceroy
- Teaching staff: 38.3 (on FTE basis)
- Grades: 9–12
- Student to teacher ratio: 17.5
- Campus size: 64 acres (26 ha)
- Campus type: Fringe rural
- Colors: Red, navy and white
- Athletics conference: Catholic High School Athletic Association
- Nickname: Gaels
- Newspaper: Gael Winds
- Yearbook: Profiles
- Tuition: $10,400 2024-2025 school year.
- Affiliation: Roman Catholic Archdiocese of New York
- Website: kennedycatholic.org

John F. Kennedy Catholic Preparatory School is an American Roman Catholic, co-educational high school located in Somers, New York. It serves 630 students in grades 9–12 from Westchester, Dutchess, Putnam and Fairfield counties and the Bronx.

Known as John F. Kennedy Catholic High School since its inception in 1966, it changed its name to John F. Kennedy Catholic Preparatory School in October 2020.

== History ==
The school was opened as St. Mary's High School in 1928. and had its last graduating class in June 1966.

In September 1966, the school was reopened as John F. Kennedy Catholic High School. The school was dedicated in May 1968, in the presence of Jacqueline Kennedy Onassis.

== Student body ==
In 2014, approximately nine percent of the student body was from China.

== Athletics ==
Kennedy Catholic fields Catholic High School Athletic Association league teams in 13 sports:

- Baseball
- Basketball
- Cross Country
- Field Hockey
- Football
- Golf
- Lacrosse
- Soccer
- Softball
- Tennis
- Track and Field
- Volleyball
- Winter Track

The volleyball team was the 2013, 2014, and 2017 CHSAA Class AA champions.

== Notable alumni ==
- Eileen Dickinson – member, Vermont House of Representatives
- Gary Gill Hill – professional baseball player
- Bernadette Meehan – diplomat and former chief international officer, Obama Foundation
- Edwin Frederick O'Brien – archbishop and cardinal, Catholic Church (as St. Mary's high school)
- Steven Santini – professional hockey player
