= Marvin Weissman =

American diplomat (1927–2017)

Marvin Weissman (January 25, 1927 – January 26, 2017) was an American diplomat. He served as U.S. Ambassador to Bolivia and Costa Rica.

== Early life ==
Weissman was born January 25, 1927, in Cleveland, Ohio. He achieved bachelor's degree from the University of Chicago in 1948 and a Masters in Public Administration from Maxwell Graduate School at Syracuse University in 1953. During 1945 to 1946, he served in the U.S. Army.

== Career ==
From 1950 to 1954, Weissman worked as examiner with the Bureau of the Budget.

From 1954 to 1955, he was a public administration advisor with the International Cooperation Administration in Santiago, Chile. From 1955 to 1958, he worked as an economic and financial consultant in Chile and Venezuela. In 1958, Weissman became director of the International Cooperation Administration's first Latin American regional conference on administrative management. From 1958 to 1961, he served as chief of the International Cooperation Administration's public Administration Division in Quito, Ecuador. In 1959 he worked as consultant on budgetary administration to the Peruvian Finance Ministry.

Weissman served as public administration advisor in Lima from 1961 to 1962 and from 1962 to 1963, he was the director of the Office for Institutional Development at the Alliance for Progress. He was also a director of the U.S. AID mission to Guatemala from 1963 - 1967, to Colombia from 1967 - 1973 and to Brazil from 1973 - 1975. From 1975 to 1977 he had served as Director of the Office of Central American Affairs.

From 1977 to 1980, he served as Ambassador to Costa Rica. In 1980, he was ambassador to Bolivia.

== Personal life and death ==
Weissman died on January 26, 2017, one day after his 90th birthday.

Diplomatic posts
Preceded by Terence A. Todman	United States Ambassador to Costa Rica; 1977–1980	Succeeded by Francis J. McNeil
