= Joseph Hooker Shea =

American politician

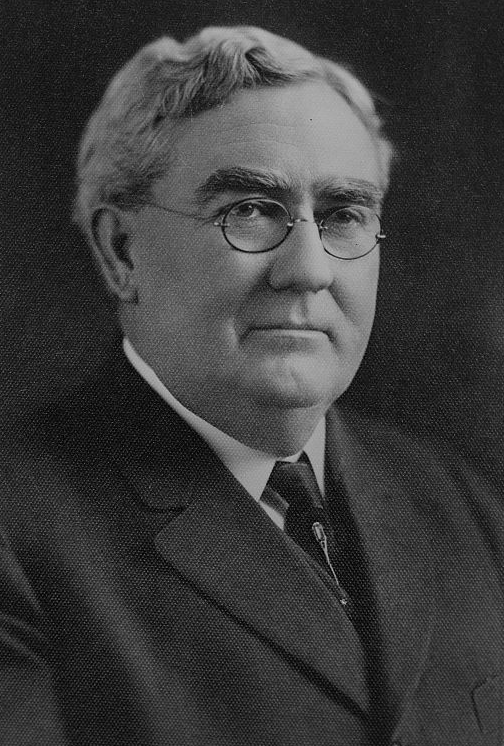
- Shea circa 1915

United States Ambassador to Chile
- In office May 30, 1916 – May 5, 1921
- President: Woodrow Wilson
- Preceded by: Henry Prather Fletcher
- Succeeded by: William Miller Collier

Personal details
- Born: July 24, 1863 Lexington, Indiana, US
- Died: December 23, 1928 (aged 65) Indianapolis, Indiana, US

Joseph Hooker Shea (July 24, 1863 – December 23, 1928) was the United States Ambassador to Chile from 1916 to 1921.

== Biography ==
He was born on July 24, 1862. Shea was a member of the Indiana Senate from 1897 to 1899. He was a judge of the Fortieth Judicial Circuit of Indiana from 1906 to 1912, then a judge of the Indiana Court of Appeals from 1913 to 1916.

He was the United States Ambassador to Chile from May 30, 1916, to May 5, 1921.

He died on December 23, 1928. He was buried in Saint Patricks Catholic Cemetery in Madison, Indiana.

Diplomatic posts
Preceded by Henry P. Fletcher	United States Ambassador to Chile; 1916–1921	Succeeded by William Miller Collier
