= Francis J. McNeil =

American diplomat (born 1932)

United States Ambassador to Costa Rica
- In office July 8, 1980 – June 27, 1983
- President: Jimmy Carter; Ronald Reagan
- Preceded by: Marvin Weissman
- Succeeded by: Curtin Winsor Jr.

Personal details
- Born: 1932 (age 93–94)
- Occupation: Diplomat

Francis J. McNeil (born 1932) was an American ambassador to Costa Rica from 1980 to 1983.

Diplomatic posts
Preceded by Marvin Weissman	United States Ambassador to Costa Rica; 1980–1983	Succeeded by Curtin Winsor Jr.
