= Harry G. Barnes Jr. =

American diplomat and ambassador

Harry G. Barnes, Jr.
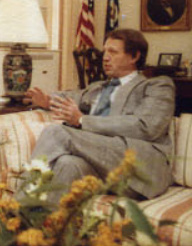
- Barnes in 1981

United States Ambassador to Chile
- In office November 18, 1985 – November 26, 1988
- President: Ronald Reagan
- Preceded by: James D. Theberge
- Succeeded by: Charles A. Gillespie, Jr.

United States Ambassador to India
- In office November 17, 1981 – June 27, 1985
- President: Ronald Reagan
- Preceded by: Robert F. Goheen
- Succeeded by: John Gunther Dean

15th Director General of the Foreign Service
- In office December 22, 1977 – February 8, 1981
- President: Jimmy Carter; Ronald Reagan
- Preceded by: Carol Laise
- Succeeded by: Joan M. Clark

United States Ambassador to Romania
- In office March 14, 1974 – November 10, 1977
- President: Richard Nixon; Gerald Ford; Jimmy Carter
- Preceded by: Leonard C. Meeker
- Succeeded by: O. Rudolph Aggrey

Personal details
- Born: June 5, 1926 St. Paul, Minnesota, U.S.
- Died: August 9, 2012 (aged 86) Lebanon, New Hampshire, U.S.
- Spouse: Elizabeth Ann Sibley
- Children: 4
- Education: Amherst College (BA); Columbia University (MA); National War College
- Profession: Diplomat

Military service
- Allegiance: United States
- Branch/service: United States Army
- Years of service: 1944-1946

Harry George Barnes Jr. (June 5, 1926 – August 9, 2012) was an American diplomat, known for his role in ending the government of Chilean dictator Augusto Pinochet. A former Foreign Service Officer who served as US ambassador to Romania, India, and Chile, Barnes also occupied the post of Director General of the Foreign Service at the Department of State between December 22, 1977, and February 8, 1981. Elliott Abrams, the United States assistant secretary of state for inter-American affairs, once called Barnes "a world-class ambassador."

== Early life ==
Harry George Barnes, Jr. was born in St. Paul, Minnesota, on June 5, 1926. He graduated from Amherst College, earned a Master's Degree in history from Columbia University, and served in the U.S. Army from 1944–46. Barnes entered the United States Foreign Service as consular officer in Bombay in 1951, and was head of the consular section in Prague in 1953–55. He was publications procurement officer in Moscow in 1957–59, leaving to become political officer in the Office of Soviet Affairs in the Department of State from 1959–62. He attended the National War College in 1962–63. In 1963–67, he was Deputy Chief of Mission in Kathmandu.

== Diplomatic career ==
Barnes served as Deputy Chief of Mission in Bucharest in 1968–71, during which time he became the first American diplomat to address the Romanian nation on television. After returning to Washington he served as supervisory personnel officer (1971–72) and deputy executive secretary (1972–74) before being named Ambassador to Romania by Richard Nixon.

Although the American government, in particular Henry Kissinger, had supported the rise of dictator Augusto Pinochet, by 1985 the Chilean opposition started to campaign against extending his rule. Barnes supported the ultimately successful effort, angering Pinochet, who called him "Dirty Harry". He advised the dictator that "[t]he ills of democracy can be cured only with more democracy." In addition to agitating for democratic reform, Barnes contributed oversight to the 1988 Chilean national plebiscite against extending Pinochet's rule, funding a parallel vote tally and advertising for the anti-Pinochet campaign.

== Retirement ==
Barnes retired from government service in 1988.

Between 1994 and 2000, he served as the director of the Carter Center's Human Rights and Conflict Resolution Programs from 1994–2000. During this time, he traveled to North Korea and worked on Carter Center initiatives in this area. He also taught at several universities.

Barnes died on August 9, 2012, in Lebanon, New Hampshire. The cause of death was an infection.

Diplomatic posts
| Preceded by Leonard C. Meeker | United States Ambassador to Romania; 1973–1977 | Succeeded by O. Rudolph Aggrey |
| Preceded by Robert F. Goheen | United States Ambassador to India; 1981–1985 | Succeeded by John Gunther Dean |
| Preceded by James D. Theberge | United States Ambassador to Chile; 1985–1988 | Succeeded by Charles A. Gillespie, Jr. |
Government offices
| Preceded by Carol Laise | Director General of the Foreign Service; 1977–1981 | Succeeded by Joan M. Clark |
