= Curtis Warren Kamman =

American diplomat (born 1939)

United States Ambassador to Colombia
- In office March 19, 1998 – August 15, 2000
- President: Bill Clinton
- Preceded by: Myles Frechette
- Succeeded by: Anne W. Patterson

United States Ambassador to Bolivia
- In office November 16, 1994 – November 26, 1997
- President: Bill Clinton
- Preceded by: Charles R. Bowers
- Succeeded by: Donna Hrinak

United States Ambassador to Chile
- In office January 14, 1992 – October 21, 1994
- President: George H. W. Bush; Bill Clinton
- Preceded by: Charles A. Gillespie Jr.
- Succeeded by: Gabriel Guerra-Mondragón

Chief of the U.S. Interests Section in Cuba
- In office August 1985 – September 1987
- President: Ronald Reagan
- Preceded by: John Arthur Ferch
- Succeeded by: John J. Taylor

Personal details
- Born: January 15, 1939 (age 87) Chicago, Illinois, U.S.
- Spouse: Mary Glasgow Curtis
- Children: 3
- Education: Yale University
- Profession: Diplomat

Curtis Warren Kamman (born January 15, 1939) is an American former career diplomat.

Kamman graduated from Tucson High School and Yale University and entered the United States Foreign Service in 1960. He served as United States Ambassador to Bolivia, Chile, and Colombia. Kamman also served in various positions in the United States Department of State, including Director of East African Affairs, and in diplomatic assignments in Mexico, Hong Kong, Kenya, Cuba and the Soviet Union. In 1991, he was sent by President George H. W. Bush to re-establish diplomatic relations with the newly independent nations of Latvia, Lithuania and Estonia.

Kamman retired from the Foreign Service in 2000. After his retirement, Kamman taught diplomacy and U.S. foreign policy at the University of Notre Dame. He is a member of the American Academy of Diplomacy.

Curtis Kamman married the former Mary Glasgow Curtis, and they have three sons.

Diplomatic posts
Preceded by Charles A. Gillespie Jr.	United States Ambassador to Chile; 1992–1994	Succeeded by Gabriel Guerra-Mondragón
Preceded by Charles R. Bowers	United States Ambassador to Bolivia; 1994–1997	Succeeded by Donna Jean Hrinak
