= St. John's Hospital (Maplewood, Minnesota) =

- M Health Fairview
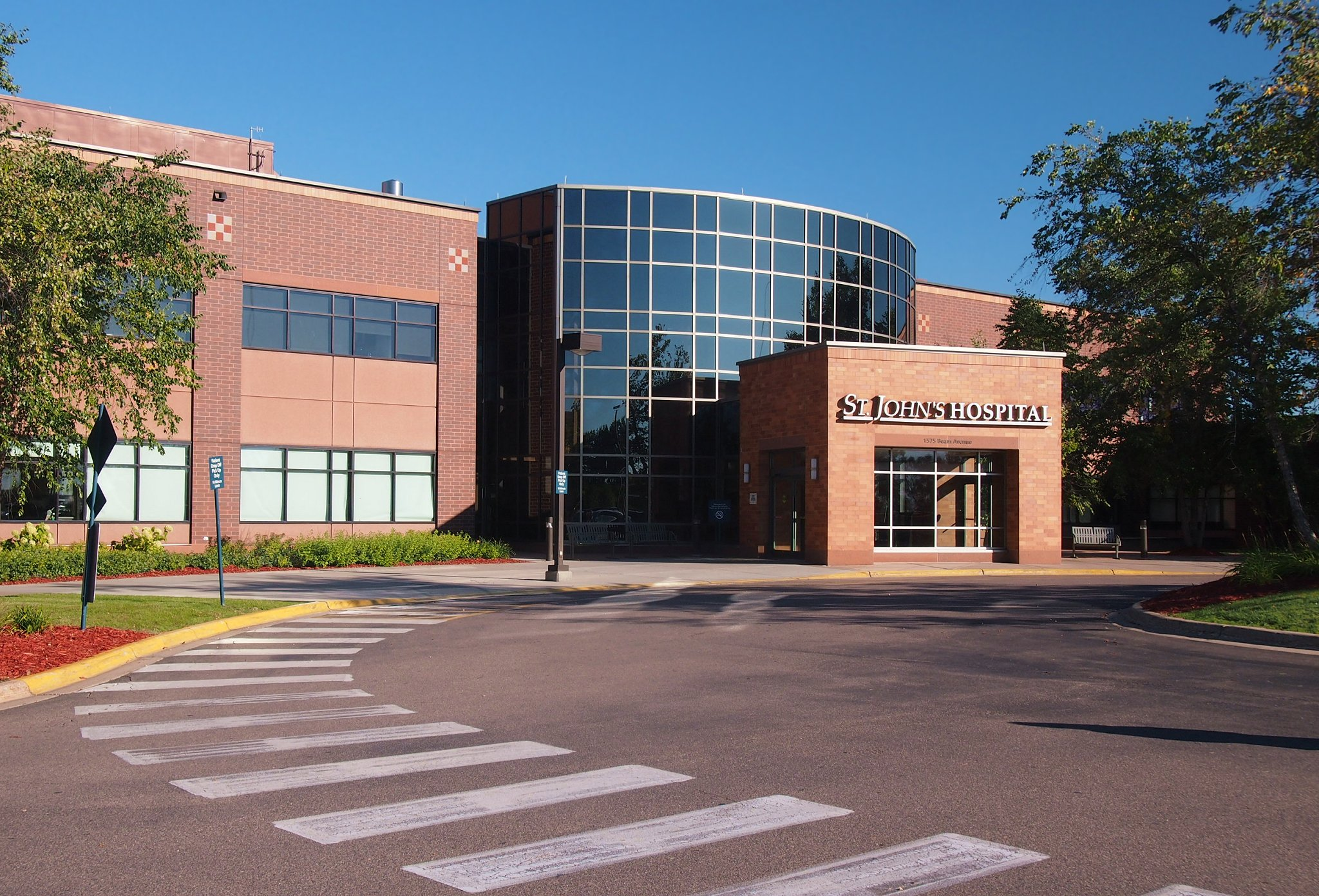
- Main entrance of St. John's Hospital

Geography
- Location: 1575 Beam Ave. Maplewood, MN 55109, Maplewood, Minnesota, United States
- Coordinates: 45°1′45″N 93°2′2″W

Organization
- Type: Community
- Network: M Health Fairview

Services
- Standards: JCAHO certified
- Emergency department: Level IV trauma center
- Beds: 184 beds

History
- Founded: 1911

Links
- Website: https://www.mhealthfairview.org/locations/m-health-fairview-st-johns-hospital
- Lists: Hospitals in Minnesota

St. John's Hospital is a full-service, acute care hospital with 184 licensed beds in Maplewood, Minnesota, United States. The hospital is a current member of the M Health Fairview family of care, after the hospital's former network, HealthEast Care System, merged with the Fairview in 2017. As a full-service acute care hospital, St. John's treats more than 41,000 patients in the emergency department every year, delivers more than 3,000 babies and performs more than 6,000 surgeries a year.

== History ==
In 1910 a private home previously owned by Gustav Willius in Saint Paul, Minnesota, was converted into a 25-bed hospital and became the first St. John's Hospital. The first two floors were for patients and the third floor provided living quarters for the nurses.

St. John's German Hospital was dedicated in September 1911. On October 1, 1911, the first patient with typhoid fever arrived at St. John's Hospital. In 1918, St. John's Hospital was turned over to the city of St. Paul during the flu epidemic to care for charity patients.

In 1985, St. John's Northeast Hospital was built at its current Maplewood, Minnesota location. The following year St. John's Hospital joined other faith-based hospitals in the Twin Cities' East Metro to form HealthEast Care System. The former location of St. John's Hospital is now home to Metropolitan State University.

== Care and services ==
St. John's is a Level 3 Trauma Center, Certified Stroke Care Center, and Heart & Lung Care.

St. John's was the first community hospital in the Twin Cities to offer a robot-assisted surgical system as a treatment option for prostate cancer patients. The hospital was the first in Minnesota to offer all digital mammography, and is also one of the first hospitals in Minnesota to offer cutting-edge artificial disc surgery to help people with lower back pain.

== Awards ==
- In 2009–2010, U.S. News & World Report named St. John's Hospital one of America's Best Hospitals. St. John's was ranked among the Top 50 hospitals in Urology and one of 174 medical centers nationwide ranked in 16 specialties.
- In 2009, Innovation of the Year in Patient Care award from the Minnesota Hospital Association - for HealthEast Maternity Care's successful Perinatal Safety program
- St. John's Hospital annually makes the Top 25 Hospitals' list in Twin Cities Business B.I.G. Book named.
- St. John's Hospital annually makes the Top 25 Hospitals' list by the Minneapolis Star Tribune.
- White Bear Area Chamber of Commerce named St. John's 2008 Business of the Year.
- In 2008, American Heart Association and American Stroke Association recognized St. John's Hospital for outstanding performance in treating heart and stroke patients.
- In 2007, USA Today reported that The Centers for Medicare and Medicaid Services (CMS) data showed St. John's Hospital is one of the best-performing hospitals in the nation for low heart failure mortality rates.
- In 2005, Solucient (Thomson Reuters) selected St. John's Hospital as a 100 Top Hospital in the nation for the third time.
