= Brandon Judd =

American law enforcement officer

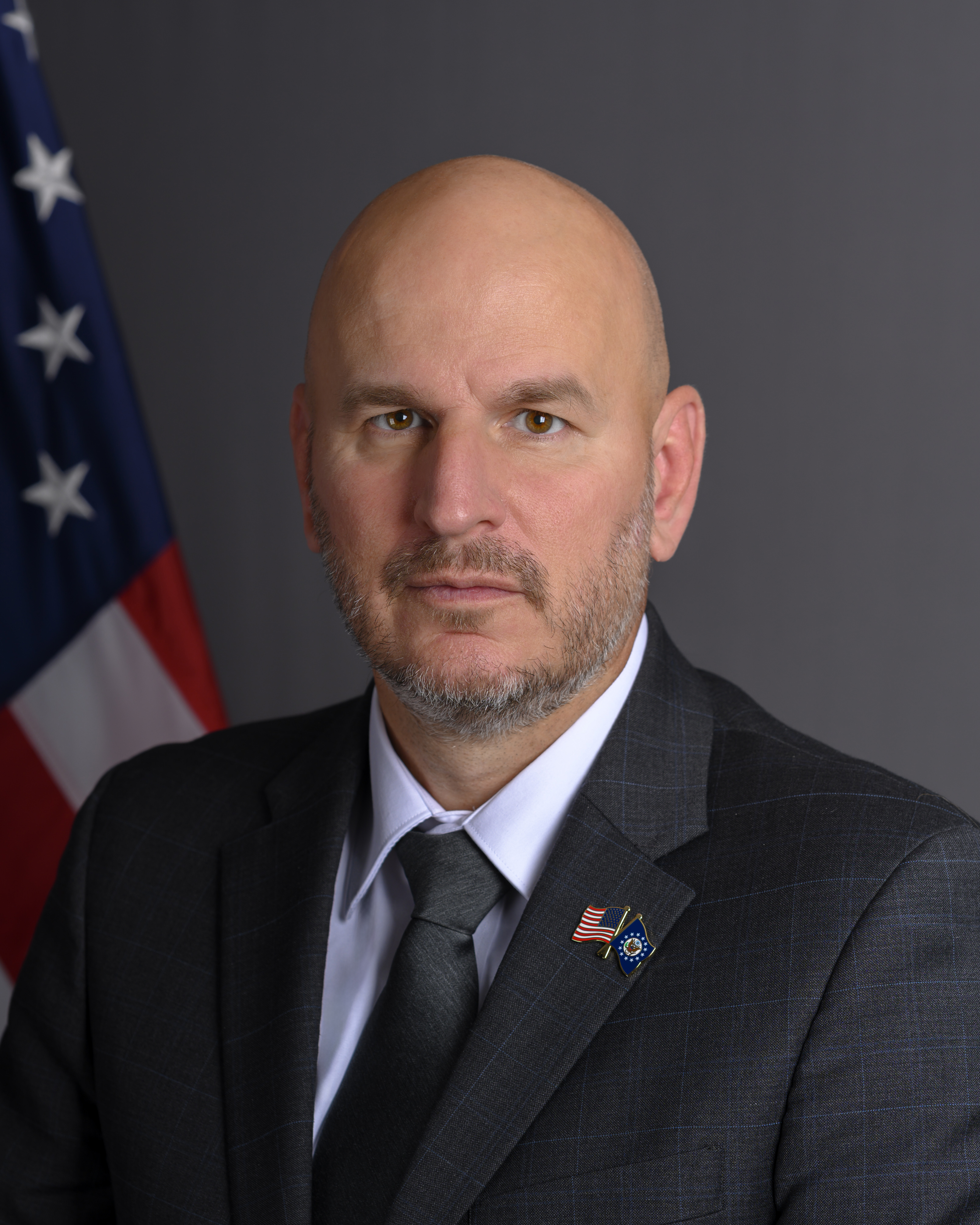
- Official portrait, 2025

50th United States Ambassador to Chile
- Incumbent
- Assumed office November 10, 2025
- President: Donald Trump
- Preceded by: Bernadette Meehan

Personal details
- Born: Arizona, U.S.

Brandon Judd is an American law enforcement officer and union organizer who is the United States ambassador to Chile under Donald Trump.

== Early life and education ==
Judd was born in Arizona.

== Career ==
Judd was commissioned as a field agent in the United States Border Patrol in 1997. His first duty station was in Imperial, California. Beginning in 2002, he was Special Operation Mountain Team Leader and a field training officer stationed in Naco, Arizona. He has also served as an instructor at the Border Patrol Academy, and as a field agent at Border Patrol posts in Houlton, Maine; El Centro, California; Tucson, Arizona; and Havre, Montana.

In 2001, Judd was elected president of the National Border Patrol Council local union in El Centro, California and, from 2010 to 2012, served as president of the NBPC local in Tucson, Arizona. In 2013, he was unanimously elected NBPC national president.

Judd retired from the U.S. Border Patrol in May 2024 after 27 years of service. In December of that year, Donald Trump announced his intention to appoint Judd as United States ambassador to Chile. He was confirmed in October 2025. He assumed the office on November 10, 2025.

Diplomatic posts
Preceded by Bernadette Meehan	United States Ambassador to Chile; 2025–present	Incumbent
