= Thomas C. Dawson =

American diplomat (1865–1912)

Thomas Cleland Dawson

7th United States Ambassador to the Dominican Republic
- In office July 23, 1904 – May 5, 1907
- Preceded by: William F. Powell
- Succeeded by: Fenton R. McCreery

8th United States Ambassador to Colombia
- In office October 16, 1907 – April 25, 1909
- Preceded by: John Barrett
- Succeeded by: Elliott Northcott

24th United States Ambassador to Chile
- In office August 20, 1909 – November 16, 1909
- Preceded by: John Hicks
- Succeeded by: Henry P. Fletcher

6th United States Ambassador to Panama
- In office September 24, 1910 – December 1, 1910
- Preceded by: R. S. Reynolds Hitt
- Succeeded by: Henry Percival Dodge

Personal details
- Born: July 30, 1865 Hudson, Wisconsin
- Died: May 1, 1912 (aged 46)

Thomas Cleland Dawson (July 30, 1865 – May 1, 1912) was a career United States diplomat.

== Biography ==
Born in Hudson, Wisconsin, Dawson received his bachelor's degree from Hanover College and his law degree from University of Cincinnati College of Law. He also studied at Harvard University. Dawson practiced law in Des Moines, Iowa and Council Bluffs, Iowa and was an assistant Iowa Attorney General. He was also a newspaper publisher. Dawson entered the diplomatic service in 1891, when he was appointed Secretary of Legation in Brazil. He was U.S. minister and consul general to the Dominican Republic (1904‑1907), during which term he negotiated the American-Dominican Fiscal Convention of 1907; then ambassador to Colombia (1907‑1909), Chile (1909), and Panama (1910). He is the author of The South American Republics (2 vols., 1903 and 1904).
