= Evan S. Medeiros =

American international relations scholar

Evan Sabino Medeiros
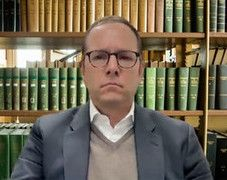
- Education: Bates College (BA); School of Oriental and African Studies, University of London (MA); University of Cambridge (M.Phil); London School of Economics and Political Science (PhD)
- Occupations: Political scientist, writer
- Employer(s): Georgetown University, The Asia Group
- Organization: RAND Corporation
- Spouse: Bernadette Meehan

Evan Sabino Medeiros is an American international relations scholar, and the Penner Family Chair in Asia Studies in the Walsh School of Foreign Service and a Cling Family Distinguished Fellow in U.S.–China Studies at Georgetown University. He is also a senior advisor at The Asia Group, a senior fellow on foreign policy at the Asia Society Policy Institute's Center for China Analysis, a non-resident senior fellow in the Carnegie Endowment for International Peace's Asia Program, a member of the National Committee on U.S.-China Relations' board of directors, a member of the International Advisory Board of Cambridge University's Centre for Geopolitics, a Life Member of the Council on Foreign Relations, and a board member of Blackberry Government Solutions.

== Education ==
Medeiros earned a BA in analytic philosophy from Bates College, a MA in China studies from SOAS University of London, a MPhil in international relations from University of Cambridge (as a U.S. Fulbright Scholar), and a PhD in international relations from London School of Economics and Political Science.

== Career ==
From 2002 to 2009, Medeiros was a senior political scientist at the RAND Corporation. From 2007 to 2008, he was a policy advisor to then U.S. Treasury Secretary Henry Paulson.

From 2009 to 2015, Medeiros served for six years at the White House National Security Council as Director for China, Taiwan and Mongolia and subsequently as Special Assistant to the President and Senior Director for Asia.

Medeiros joined the Eurasia Group in September 2015 as managing director and Asia Practice Lead.

Medeiros is a participant of the Task Force on U.S.-China Policy convened by the Asia Society's Center on US-China Relations.

In 2023, Washingtonian named Medeiros one of DC's 500 most influential people.

== Personal life ==
Medeiros is married to Bernadette Meehan, former US ambassador to Chile and, as of January 20, 2026, the chief executive of the Wikimedia Foundation.

== Publications ==
=== Reports ===
- The New Domestic Politics of U.S.–China Relations, Asia Society, December 7, 2023
- Chinese Perspectives on the Sino-Russian Relationship, National Bureau of Asian Research, July 17, 2017
- China's International Behavior: Activism, Opportunism, and Diversification, RAND Corporation, July 27, 2009
- Pacific Currents: The Responses of U.S. Allies and Security Partners in East Asia to China's Rise, RAND Corporation, November 17, 2008
- Reluctant Restraint: The Evolution of China's Nonproliferation Policies and Practices, 1980–2004, East–West Center, January 1, 2007

=== Articles ===
- The Delusion of Peak China, Foreign Affairs, April 24, 2024
- The US must grasp the opportunity to stabilise relations with China, Financial Times, May 26, 2023
- How Antony Blinken's visit can bring some stability to volatile US-China relations, South China Morning Post, February 4, 2023 (co-authored with Bates Gill)
- How to Craft a Durable China Strategy, Foreign Affairs, March 17, 2021
- Don't squeeze Taiwan, Brookings Institution, February 7, 2018 (co-authored with Ryan Hass)

=== Congressional testimonies ===
- Analyzing China's Defense Industries and the Implications for Chinese Military Modernization, RAND Corporation, February 6, 2004
