= John O'Leary (ambassador) =

American politician and diplomat

United States Ambassador to Chile
- In office August 19, 1998 – June 29, 2001
- President: Bill Clinton; George W. Bush
- Preceded by: Gabriel Guerra-Mondragón
- Succeeded by: William R. Brownfield

Mayor of Portland, Maine
- In office 1980–1981
- Preceded by: Llewellyn Smith
- Succeeded by: Pamela Plumb

Personal details
- Born: January 16, 1947 Portland, Maine
- Died: April 2, 2005 (aged 58) Washington, D.C.
- Party: Democratic
- Spouse: Patricia Cepeda

John O'Leary (January 16, 1947 – April 2, 2005) served as mayor of Portland, Maine, and as United States ambassador to Chile under President Bill Clinton.

== Personal life ==
O'Leary was born in Portland and graduated from Yale University in 1969. He later attended Clare College, Cambridge University, on a Mellon fellowship and received a master's degree in 1971. He received a degree from Yale Law School in 1974. While studying at Yale Law, O'Leary acted as a coach for the Yale debate team. He then went on to a private law practice.

O'Leary married a fellow Yale student, Patricia Cepeda, the daughter of Colombian writer Álvaro Cepeda Samudio. John and Patricia O'Leary had two daughters. The O'Learys endowed the John O'Leary and Patricia Cepeda Fellowship for the Study of Latin America at Yale College. he died of motor neurone disease in DC in April 2005 at 58

== Political career ==
He served as a member of the Portland City Council 1975-82) and for a term as that city's largely ceremonial Mayor (1980–81). He ran unsuccessful candidate for the U.S. House from Maine's First Congressional District in 1982, losing in the Democratic primary. O'Leary served as the United States Ambassador to Chile from 1998 to 2001.

== Sources ==
- Holley, Joe (2005-04-03). "John O'Leary Dies; Mayor, Ambassador to Chile". The Washington Post. p. C08.

Political offices
Preceded by Unknown	City Councilman, Portland, Maine; 1975–1982	Succeeded by Unknown
Preceded by Llewellyn Smith	Mayor, Portland, Maine; 1980–1981	Succeeded by Pamela Plumb
Party political offices
Preceded by Unknown	Democratic Nominee, U.S. Congress, Maine District 1; 1982	Succeeded by Unknown
Diplomatic posts
Preceded by Gabriel Guerra-Mondragón	United States Ambassador to Chile; August 19, 1998 – June 29, 2001	Succeeded by William R. Brownfield
