= Maplewood, Minnesota =

City in Minnesota, United States

- City
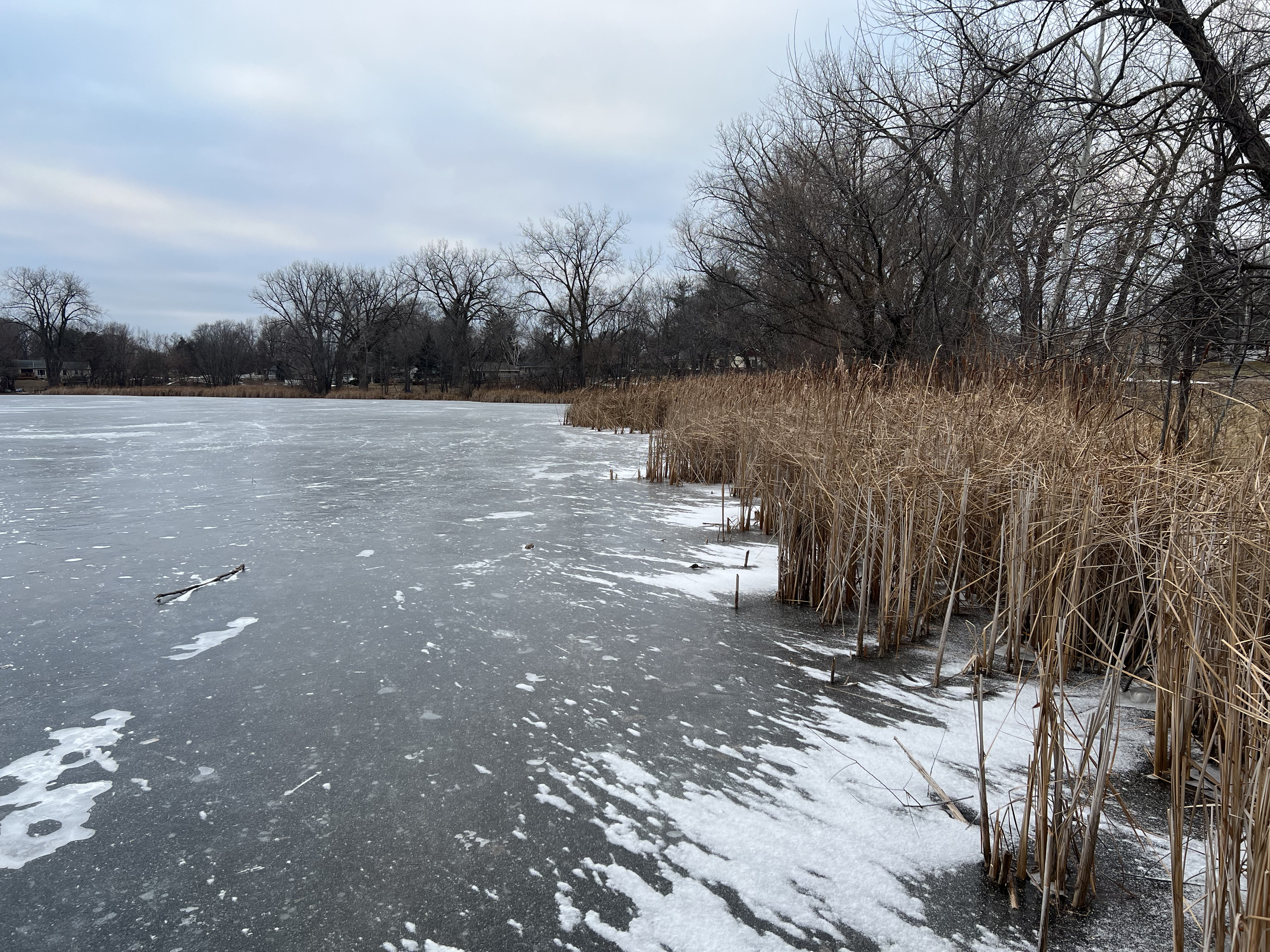
- Wakefield Lake in Maplewood

- Location of the city of Maplewood within Ramsey County, Minnesota
- Coordinates: 45°00′30″N 93°01′30″W
- Country: United States
- State: Minnesota
- County: Ramsey
- Incorporated: February 26, 1957

Government
  - Mayor: Marylee Abrams

Area
  - Total: 18.05 sq mi (46.74 km^{2})
  - Land: 17.04 sq mi (44.14 km^{2})
  - Water: 1.00 sq mi (2.60 km^{2})
- Elevation: 873 ft (266 m)

Population (2020)
  - Total: 42,088
  - Estimate (2022): 40,000
  - Density: 2,469.6/sq mi (953.51/km^{2})
- Time zone: UTC-6 (Central)
  - Summer (DST): UTC-5 (CDT)
- ZIP codes: 55106, 55109, 55117, 55119
- Area code: 651
- FIPS code: 27-40382
- GNIS feature ID: 2395846
- Website: maplewoodmn.gov

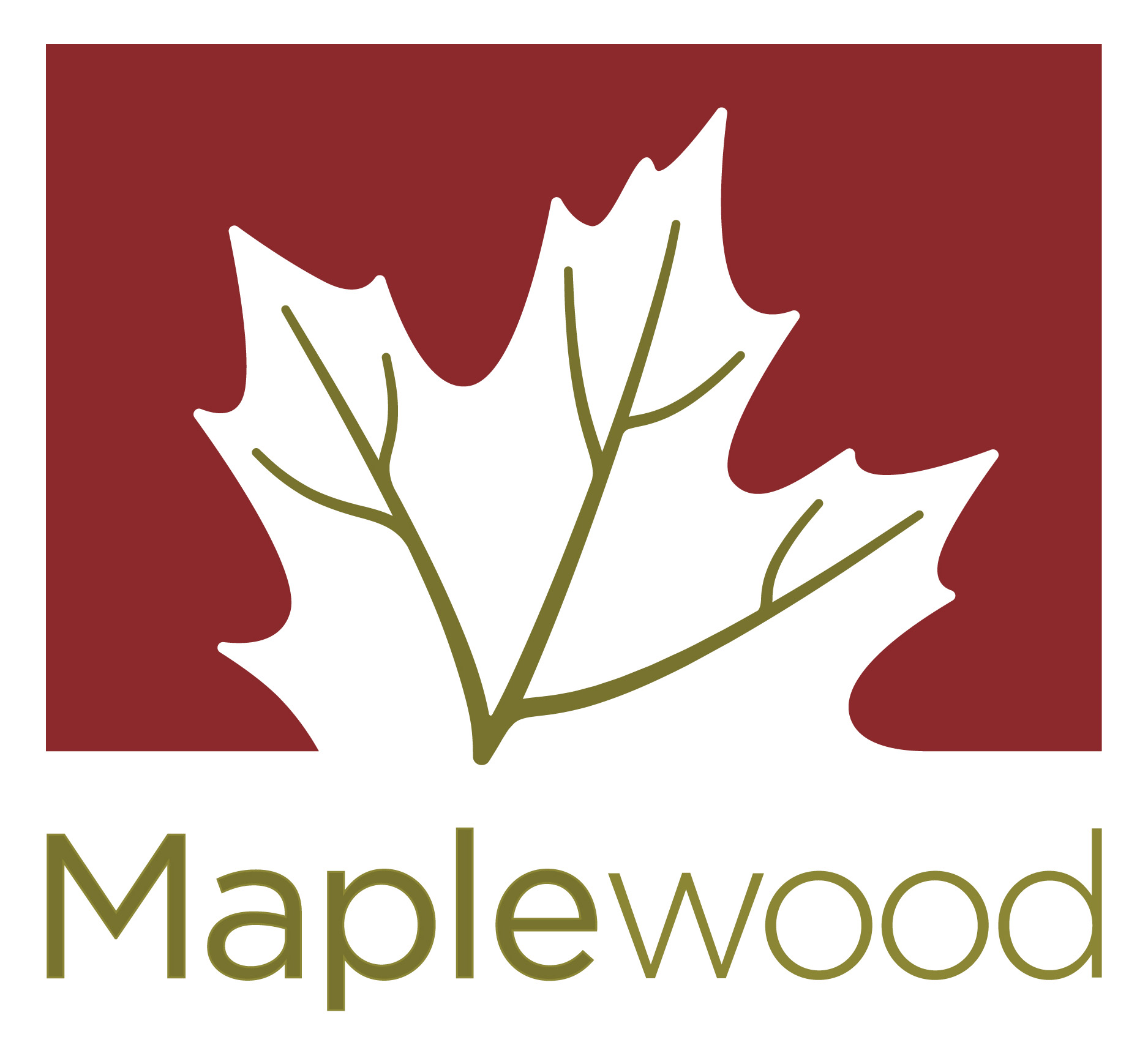
Maplewood Logo

Maplewood is a city in Ramsey County, Minnesota, United States. The population was 42,088 at the 2020 census. Maplewood is ten minutes' drive from downtown Saint Paul. It stretches along the northern and eastern borders of Saint Paul.

Maplewood is home to the corporate headquarters and main campus of 3M Corporation. The city is also home to the Maplewood Mall and St. John's Hospital.

== History ==
Before European Settlement in the 1840s, multiple indigenous peoples inhabited the area around Maplewood. The area was inhabited during the Woodland period, with Dakota tribes settling in the area in the 18th century.

The Maplewood area began being settled by Europeans in the 1850s. A stagecoach line operated from Saint Paul to Duluth from 1856 to 1870, stopping in the area.This ceased operation with the linkage of the construction of the Lake Superior and Mississippi Railroad in 1870.

In 1858, upon Minnesota's statehood, the area was organized under the McLean and New Canada Townships. The area town site of Gladstone was platted in 1887, but after a boom in the 1890s, quickly declined. During this period, Saint Paul began to annex land in the area, the primary reason for the city's 'L' shape.

In 1955, the 3M corporation completed the first buildings of its central research laboratory in the area. Rumors of annexation by Saint Paul lead to the area incorporating in 1957, by a vote of 5 to 1. This also allowed 3M to operate on the village tax base, rather than the one of St. Paul. Maplewood had a population of 14,200 when it was incorporated.

From the 1950s onwards, Maplewood transitioned from rural farmsteads to suburban neighborhoods. The 125 acre Maplewood Mall opened in 1974, and St. John's Hospital in 1985.

In 1993, the NCAA Division III men's ice hockey tournament was held in Maplewood's Aldrich Arena attracting just under 14,000 fans.

== Geography ==
According to the United States Census Bureau, the city has an area of 17.99 square miles (46.59 km^{2}), of which 16.98 square miles (43.98 km^{2}) is land and 1.01 square miles (2.62 km^{2}) is water.

U.S. Highway 61, Minnesota Highway 36, and Interstate Highways 35E, 94, 694, and 494 are six of the main routes in the city.

The city has a unique shape, extending 5.9 miles east to west and 10 miles north to south, with a 7.5-mile-long, nearly one-mile-wide southern leg. The origin of the Maplewood name is unclear, when organized the area was largely prairie and oak savanna. "There are no maple trees in Maplewood" according to the director of the local historical society.

== Demographics ==
Historical population
Census	Pop.	Note	%±
1960	18,519		—
1970	25,186		36.0%
1980	26,990		7.2%
1990	30,954		14.7%
2000	34,947		12.9%
2010	38,018		8.8%
2020	42,088		10.7%
2022 (est.)	40,000		−5.0%
U.S. Decennial Census; 2020 Census

=== Racial and ethnic composition ===
Maplewood city, Minnesota – Racial composition Note: the US Census treats Hispanic/Latino as an ethnic category. This table excludes Latinos from the racial categories and assigns them to a separate category. Hispanics/Latinos may be of any race.
Race (NH = Non-Hispanic)	2020	2010	2000	1990	1980
White alone (NH)	55.7% (23,434)	72.6% (27,598)	87.6% (30,602)	93.5% (28,941)	96% (25,906)
Black alone (NH)	11% (4,646)	8% (3,029)	3.5% (1,215)	2.4% (748)	1.5% (395)
American Indian alone (NH)	0.4% (156)	0.4% (160)	0.5% (172)	0.5% (155)	0.6% (158)
Asian alone (NH)	19% (8,006)	10.4% (3,939)	4.5% (1,581)	2% (620)	0.7% (198)
Pacific Islander alone (NH)	0% (15)	0% (13)	0.1% (24)		
Other race alone (NH)	0.4% (174)	0.1% (31)	0.1% (41)	0% (11)	0% (7)
Multiracial (NH)	4.6% (1,918)	2.4% (906)	1.5% (533)	—	—
Hispanic/Latino (any race)	8.9% (3,739)	6.2% (2,342)	2.2% (779)	1.5% (479)	1.2% (326)

=== 2020 census ===
As of the 2020 census, Maplewood had a population of 42,088. The median age was 38.5 years. 22.7% of residents were under the age of 18 and 18.3% of residents were 65 years of age or older. For every 100 females there were 92.2 males, and for every 100 females age 18 and over there were 90.0 males age 18 and over.

100.0% of residents lived in urban areas, while 0.0% lived in rural areas.

There were 15,994 households in Maplewood, of which 28.5% had children under the age of 18 living in them. Of all households, 43.6% were married-couple households, 18.0% were households with a male householder and no spouse or partner present, and 30.5% were households with a female householder and no spouse or partner present. About 30.1% of all households were made up of individuals and 15.4% had someone living alone who was 65 years of age or older.

There were 16,569 housing units, of which 3.5% were vacant. The homeowner vacancy rate was 0.7% and the rental vacancy rate was 5.1%.

The most reported ancestries in 2020 were:

- German (24.1%)
- Hmong (13.3%)
- Irish (12.6%)
- English (8.5%)
- Norwegian (7%)
- Swedish (6.5%)
- African American (5.8%)
- Mexican (5.7%)
- Polish (3.9%)
- French (3.9%)

Racial composition as of the 2020 census
Race	Number	Percent
White	24,255	57.6%
Black or African American	4,732	11.2%
American Indian and Alaska Native	268	0.6%
Asian	8,026	19.1%
Native Hawaiian and Other Pacific Islander	25	0.1%
Some other race	1,876	4.5%
Two or more races	2,906	6.9%
Hispanic or Latino (of any race)	3,739	8.9%

=== 2010 census ===
As of the census of 2010, there were 38,018 people, 14,882 households, and 9,620 families living in the city. The population density was 2,239.0 inhabitants per square mile (864.5/km^{2}). There were 15,561 housing units at an average density of 916.4 per square mile (353.8/km^{2}).

Of the 14,882 households 30.3% had children under the age of 18 living with them, 47.8% were married couples living together, 12.1% had a female householder with no husband present, 4.7% had a male householder with no wife present, and 35.4% were non-families. 29.1% of households were one person and 12.5% were one person aged 65 or older. The average household size was 2.48 and the average family size was 3.08.

The median age was 39.3 years. 22.9% of residents were under the age of 18; 9% were between the ages of 18 and 24; 25.2% were from 25 to 44; 27.7% were from 45 to 64; and 15.2% were 65 or older. The gender makeup of the city was 48.0% male and 52.0% female.

=== 2000 census ===
As of the census of 2000, there were 34,947 people, 13,758 households, and 9,190 families living in the city. The population density was 2,017.5 inhabitants per square mile (779.0/km^{2}). There were 14,004 housing units at an average density of 808.5 per square mile (312.2/km^{2}). The racial makeup of the city was 72.6% White, 8.0% African American, 0.4% Native American, 10.4% Asian, 0.03% Pacific Islander, 0.08% from other races, and 2.4% from two or more races. Hispanic or Latino of any race were 6.2% of the population.

Of the 13,758 households 31.6% had children under the age of 18 living with them, 52.8% were married couples living together, 10.5% had a female householder with no husband present, and 33.2% were non-families. 27.0% of households were one person and 11.1% were one person aged 65 or older. The average household size was 2.48 and the average family size was 3.04.

The age distribution was 24.7% under the age of 18, 7.7% from 18 to 24, 30.0% from 25 to 44, 22.6% from 45 to 64, and 15.0% 65 or older. The median age was 38 years. For every 100 females, there were 91.5 males. For every 100 females age 18 and over, there were 87.8 males.

The median household income was $51,596 and the median family income was $63,049. Males had a median income of $43,033 versus $30,557 for females. The per capita income for the city was $24,387. About 3.0% of families and 4.8% of the population were below the poverty line, including 4.9% of those under age 18 and 5.6% of those age 65 or over.

The current city council includes the following five members:

Office	Member	First elected/appointed	District
Mayor	Marylee Abrams	2014	At Large
Council member	Kathleen Juenemann	2001	At Large
Council member	Chonburi Lee	2023	At Large
Council member	Rebecca Cave	2020	At Large
Council member	Nikki Villavicencio	2020	At Large

=== Politics ===
United States presidential election results for Maplewood, Minnesota
Year	Republican		Democratic		Third party(ies)	
Year	No.	%	No.	%	No.	%
2000	7,286	40.14%	9,716	53.53%	1,148	6.33%
2004	8,639	41.90%	11,743	56.96%	235	1.14%
2008	8,046	38.46%	12,458	59.54%	419	2.00%
2012	8,178	38.25%	12,750	59.64%	451	2.11%
2016	7,370	35.28%	11,751	56.26%	1,767	8.46%
2020	7,797	34.53%	14,261	63.16%	520	2.30%
2024	7,607	36.06%	12,984	61.55%	504	2.39%

== Economy ==
According to the city's 2020 Comprehensive Annual Financial Report, the largest employers in the city are:

#	Employer	# of Employees
1	3M	12,000
2	Independent School District 622	1,829
3	St. John's Hospital	973
4	Target	550
5	First Student Charter	400
6	Cub Foods (two locations)	350
7	Canvas Health	300
8	Ramsey County Nursing Home	240
9	Costco	200
10	City of Maplewood	186

== Notable people ==
- Lee Hawkins, journalist
- Audra Morrison (born 1994), professional ice hockey player for the Minnesota Whitecaps
- Jim O'Brien (born 1989), professional ice hockey player for the Thomas Sabo Ice Tigers
- Allie Thunstrom (born 1988), professional ice hockey player for the Minnesota Whitecaps
