= William Frank Powell =

American diplomat

William F. Powell

United States Minister Resident to the Dominican Republic
- Acting
- In office June 17, 1897 – July 23, 1904
- President: William McKinley
- Preceded by: Henry M. Smythe
- Succeeded by: Thomas C. Dawson

United States Minister Resident to Haiti
- In office June 17, 1897 – November 30, 1905
- President: William McKinley
- Preceded by: Henry M. Smythe
- Succeeded by: Henry W. Furniss

Personal details
- Born: June 26, 1848 Troy, New York
- Died: January 23, 1920 (aged 71)

William Frank Powell (June 26, 1848 – January 23, 1920) was an American diplomat and educator. Powell was the United States Ambassador to the Republic of Haiti from 1897 to 1905. At the same time Powell served as the chargé d'affaires in the Dominican Republic until 1904.

== Life and career ==
William Frank Powell was born in Troy, New York. He attended the New York School of Pharmacy, Lincoln University, and the New Jersey Collegiate School. Powell also served in the U.S. Navy near the end of the Civil War.

In 1869, Powell moved to Virginia and worked as a principal in an African American school in Leesburg. He also founded his own African American school only a year later in Alexandria. In 1875, he returned to New Jersey to head Bordentown School. Powell's first foray into a political position began in 1881 when he took a position as a clerk for the United States Treasury. After only a year he moved to Camden to continue work as a supervising principal. In 1886, he took a position at Camden High School, a predominantly white school.

Powell was appointed as Envoy Extraordinary and Minister Plenipotentiary to Haiti by President William McKinley in 1897. When he was appointed, many New York businessmen who did business in Haiti took issue. They did so on the platform that the successive appointment of Black men to the position tarnished the reputation of the position and would hurt American business. In reality, one of Powell's main goals was to promote American business interests. Powell was the sixth African American to serve as the American minister to Haiti and the diplomat directly preceding Powell, Henry M. Smythe, was a white man. The protests of the businessmen were presented to the President by Senator Thomas C. Platt but nothing came of it.

Like many of the other ministers before him, Powell was the American diplomat in Haiti as well as the chargé d'affaires in the Dominican Republic, still officially called Santo Domingo by the U.S. government. During his tenure, Powell's life was threatened multiple times. There was a plot to assassinate him during a staged fight and Powell reported after he retired that he was shot twice while in office. Powell tendered his resignation during a leave of absence, saying that he had tempted fate enough.

After the end of Powell's term, he returned to Camden and became a writer for the Philadelphia Tribune, an African American newspaper. In 1907 he was awarded an honorary LL.D. from Lincoln University. He died January 23, 1920. The William F. Powell Elementary School was named in his honor but was razed in 2010.
