= Robert F. Goheen =

American academic and diplomat (1919–2008)

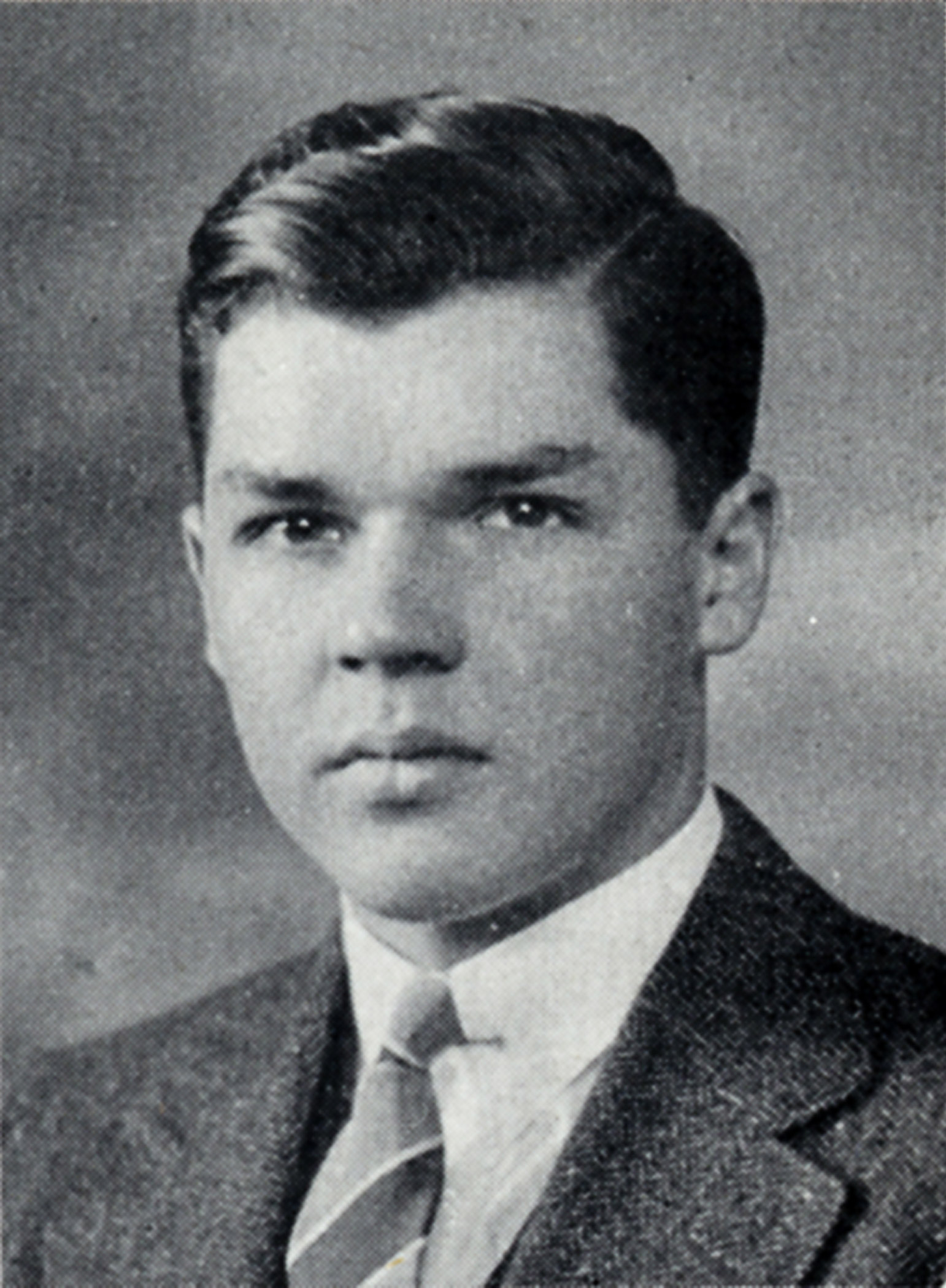
- Goheen at Princeton in 1936

16th President of Princeton University
- In office 1957–1972
- Preceded by: Harold W. Dodds
- Succeeded by: William G. Bowen

United States Ambassador to India
- In office May 26, 1977 – December 10, 1980
- President: Jimmy Carter
- Preceded by: Bill Saxbe
- Succeeded by: Harry G. Barnes Jr.

Personal details
- Born: August 15, 1919 Vengurla, Bombay Presidency, British India (now Maharashtra, India)
- Died: March 31, 2008 (aged 88) Princeton, New Jersey, U.S.
- Spouse: Margaret Skelly
- Children: 4
- Education: Princeton University (BA, PhD)
- Profession: Academic

Military service
- Allegiance: United States
- Branch/service: United States Army
- Rank: Lieutenant Colonel
- Battles/wars: World War II

Robert Francis Goheen (August 15, 1919 – March 31, 2008) was an American academic, president of Princeton University and United States Ambassador to India.

== Biography ==
Robert Francis Goheen was born on August 15, 1919, to Anne (Ewing) and Dr Robert H. H. Goheen in Vengurla, India, where both his parents were serving as Presbyterian medical missionaries. His early education through the tenth grade was at Kodai School in India. After moving to the United States in 1934, he completed his secondary school education at the Lawrenceville School in New Jersey in 1936. He then attended Princeton University, where he won the Moses Taylor Pyne Prize and graduated summa cum laude with an A.B. in classics in 1940 after completing a senior thesis titled "A Study of the Nature and Object of Tragedy." He was also an avid soccer player.

During World War II, Goheen trained at Camp Ritchie and became one of many Ritchie Boys. His training as an intelligence officer at Ritchie during the war, in part, helped Goheen reach the rank of lieutenant colonel. He returned to Princeton after the war to pursue graduate studies, earning a Ph.D. in classics in 1948 after completing a doctoral dissertation titled "The imagery of Sophocles' Antigone (a study of poetic language and structure)." Goheen was one of the first four students to receive a fellowship from The Institute for Citizens & Scholars, established at Princeton to encourage war veterans to pursue a career in teaching.

In 1942, Goheen married Margaret Skelly. They had four daughters (Anne, Trudi, Megan, and Elizabeth) and two sons (Stephen and Charley), who gave them 18 grandchildren, including the American novelist Megan Crane.

Goheen was elected to the American Academy of Arts and Sciences in 1962 and the American Philosophical Society in 1986.

== Princeton University career ==
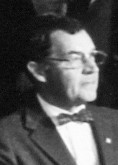
Robert F. Goheen in 1978

Goheen taught classics at Princeton as an assistant professor from 1950 until 1957, when he was appointed the university's 16th president. He served as president of the university from 1957 to 1972. At 37, he was the youngest man to assume that position since the 18th century. Faced with the social and political challenges of the 1960s, Goheen encouraged student involvement in decision-making processes and initiated active recruitment of minorities, as well as overseeing the admission of women in 1969. The New York Times reported after his death: "Dr. Goheen would eventually build or acquire 38 buildings, increasing the university’s indoor square footage by 80 percent. He quadrupled the budget, doubled alumni giving and increased the number of faculty members by 40 percent. ... The university changed fundamentally under Dr. Goheen’s leadership, going from an establishment cradle to a diversified and complex research university. He attacked the exclusivity of the eating clubs, even opening one to be run by the university. He hired Princeton’s first black administrator and first black full professor and aggressively recruited promising minority students."

== Later life ==
After his retirement from Princeton in 1972, he was named president of the Council on Foundations in New York. On January 1, 1977, he became president of the Edna McConnell Clark Foundation, but that April he was appointed by President Jimmy Carter to become United States Ambassador to India. He served in the country of his birth from 1977 to 1980.

He returned to Princeton University in 1981, serving on the faculty of the Princeton School of Public and International Affairs. He was involved with many activities related to Asia, including a Study Mission to the Philippines in January 1986 sponsored by the Asia Society.

He died in Princeton, New Jersey on March 31, 2008.

Academic offices
Preceded by Harold W. Dodds	President of Princeton University; 1957–1972	Succeeded by William G. Bowen
Diplomatic posts
Preceded by William B. Saxbe	United States Ambassador to India; 1977–1980	Succeeded by Harry G. Barnes, Jr.
