= Gabriel Guerra-Mondragón =

American diplomat (born 1942)

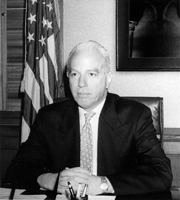
- Guerra-Mondragón in the US Embassy at Santiago, Chile

United States Ambassador to Chile
- In office November 24, 1994 – June 13, 1998
- President: Bill Clinton
- Preceded by: Curtis Warren Kamman
- Succeeded by: John O'Leary

Personal details
- Born: September 4, 1942 (age 84) San Juan, Puerto Rico
- Party: Democratic Party
- Other political affiliations: Popular Democratic Party of Puerto Rico
- Spouse: Divorced
- Education: Fordham University, Johns Hopkins University (MA); University of Puerto Rico School of Law (JD)
- Profession: Diplomatic Corps, Attorney at Law

Gabriel Guerra-Mondragón (born September 4, 1942 in San Juan, Puerto Rico) was the United States Ambassador to Chile from 1994-1998. Nominated by President Bill Clinton in July 1994, and was confirmed by the United States Senate on October 4 of that year. He was administered the oath of office by Vice President Albert Gore on October 25, 1994 and arrived in Santiago on November 8, 1994 to present his credentials to Chilean President Eduardo Frei Ruiz-Tagle.

As the ambassador to Chile, Gabriel Guerra-Mondragón angered many right-wing Chilean leaders because he publicly stated that the Chilean president does not have the Constitutional authority to remove the top military leaders, according to the Chilean constitution of 1980. Many of Pinochet's supporters in the Chilean parliament were infuriated by these remarks, however left-wing politicians and other Pinochet opponents considered that the ambassador had merely spoken the truth.

An alumnus of Colegio San Ignacio; Fordham University; the School of Advanced International Studies of Johns Hopkins University; and the University of Puerto Rico School of Law, Guerra-Mondragón has an extensive knowledge and background in the field of international relations and is fluent in Spanish and English.

He joined the Foreign Service of the United States in 1976. His assignments included as a Foreign Service Officer included Nicaragua Desk Officer in the United States Department of State in 1977; Executive Director, US National Commission for UNESCO from 1977–1979; Staff Assistant in the Office of the Secretary of State from 1979–1980; Special Assistant to the Ambassador and then Political Officer at the US Embassy in Mexico City from 1980–1983; and Colombia Desk Officer in the Department of State from 1983-1984.

In 1984, Ambassador Guerra-Mondragón was assigned on a detail from the Department of State as Deputy Program Director for Latin America and the Caribbean of the National Democratic Institute for International Affairs in Washington, DC, where he served until 1986. In that year, he became President of TKC International Incorporated in Washington, D.C. In 1994, he was appointed by President Clinton as a Commissioner of the American Battle Monuments Commission in Washington, DC.

In addition to his foreign service experience, Ambassador Guerra-Mondragón is a member of the Council on Foreign Relations; a former member of the Puerto Rican Legal and Education Defense Fund; and a member of the Puerto Rico Bar Association. Appointed by President Barack Obama to the J. William Fulbright Foreign Scholarship Board in 2012. Board Member of the Jose Limon Dance Foundation, New York.

Presently, Ambassador Guerra-Mondragón has returned to his homeland: San Juan, Puerto Rico. He continues to be the President of Guerra and Associates, an International Consulting Firm that specializes in U.S. and Latin America relations.

He is the grandson of Miguel Guerra Mondragón, who was a very well known attorney and politician in Puerto Rico.

Diplomatic posts
| Preceded by Curtis Warren Kamman | United States Ambassador to Chile; 24 November 1994–13 June 1998 | Succeeded by John O'Leary |
