= Hal H. Sevier =

American journalist

United States Ambassador to Chile
- In office 1933–1935

Personal details
- Born: March 16, 1878 Columbia, Tennessee, U.S.
- Died: March 10, 1940 (aged 61) Chattanooga, Tennessee, U.S.
- Spouse(s): Clara Driscoll (m. July 31, 1906, div. July 7, 1937)
- Profession: Diplomat

Henry Hulme "Hal" Sevier (March 16, 1878 – March 10, 1940) was an American diplomat. He served as United States Ambassador to Chile from 1933 to 1935.

== Early life ==
Sevier was born on March 16, 1878, in Columbia, Tennessee.

== Career ==
Sevier was a newspaper editor in his home state until 1895, when he founded the Austin American newspaper in Texas. He served as the editor until 1918. During World War I, he was chairman of the committee responsible for distributing public information to Argentina and Chile.

He served as United States Ambassador to Chile from 1933 to 1935.

== Personal life and death ==
Sevier married Clara Driscoll on July 31, 1906. The couple divorced on July 7, 1937

Sevier died on March 10, 1940, in Chattanooga, Tennessee.

Diplomatic posts
| Preceded by William S. Culbertson | United States Ambassador to Chile; 1933–1935 | Succeeded by Hoffman Philip |
