= Lewis Arthur Tambs =

American ambassador to Colombia from 1983 - 1985 and Costa Rica from 1985 - 1987

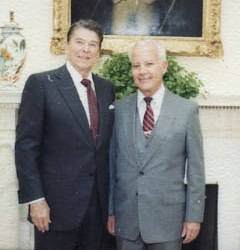
- 1985, on right, with Ronald Reagan

United States Ambassador to Colombia
- In office May 2, 1983 – February 15, 1985
- President: Ronald Reagan
- Preceded by: Thomas D. Boyatt
- Succeeded by: Charles A. Gillespie Jr.

United States Ambassador to Costa Rica
- In office August 1, 1985 – January 1, 1987
- President: Ronald Reagan
- Preceded by: Curtin Winsor Jr.
- Succeeded by: Deane R. Hinton

Personal details
- Born: July 7, 1927 San Diego
- Died: October 19, 2017 (aged 90) Tempe, Arizona
- Education: University of California, Berkeley; University of California, Santa Barbara

Lewis Arthur Tambs (July 7, 1927 — October 19, 2017) was a professor of Latin American history at Arizona State University and an expert on Latin American geopolitics. He was American ambassador to Colombia from 1983–1985 and Costa Rica from 1985–1987. Tambs was born in San Diego, California.

Diplomatic posts
Preceded by Curtin Winsor Jr.	United States Ambassador to Costa Rica; 1983–1985	Succeeded by Deane R. Hinton
Preceded by Thomas D. Boyatt	United States Ambassador to Colombia; 1985–1987	Succeeded by Charles A. Gillespie Jr.
