= Curtin Winsor Jr. =

American diplomat (born 1939)

United States Ambassador to Costa Rica
- In office July 14, 1983 – February 18, 1985
- President: Ronald Reagan
- Preceded by: Francis J. McNeil
- Succeeded by: Lewis Arthur Tambs

Personal details
- Born: April 28, 1939 (age 87) Philadelphia, Pennsylvania
- Education: B.A., Brown University; M.A., Ph.D., American University

Curtin Winsor Jr. (born April 28, 1939) is a former Ambassador of the United States to Costa Rica.

== Biography ==
Winsor was born in Philadelphia, Pennsylvania, on April 28, 1939, and graduated from Brown University in 1961 with a degree in English literature. Following his undergraduate studies, he received a master's degree in Latin American studies in 1964 and his Ph.D. in international studies in 1971 from the School of International Service at American University in Washington, D.C. After a stint as an academic researcher, he joined the United States Foreign Service in 1967. From 1971 to 1973, he assisted Kansas's Senator Robert Dole. Winsor subsequently worked for Chase Manhattan Bank and several non-profit concerns focusing on international and free-trade issues.

Winsor was a foreign-policy adviser to former California Governor Ronald Reagan in his successful 1980 presidential campaign. Following the 1980 campaign, President Reagan sent him as Special Emissary to the Middle East. From 1983 to 1985, he was the United States Ambassador to Costa Rica. He was involved with several non-profit boards, including those of the William H. Donner Foundation, the Donner Canadian Foundation, the Hudson Institute, the Atlas Economic Research Foundation, and the Media Research Center, as well as the National Council of the American Council of Trustees and Alumni.

Winsor is the founder and past owner of the American Chemical Services Company of Marmet, West Virginia, which has produced chemicals for controlling dust and frozen coal for coal mines and users since 1981.

Diplomatic posts
Preceded by Francis J. McNeil	United States Ambassador to Costa Rica; 1985–1987	Succeeded by Lewis Arthur Tambs
