= Megan Crane =

American novelist

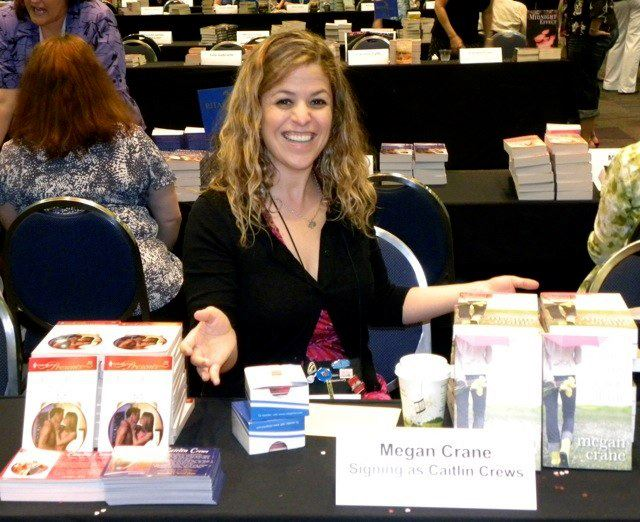
- Education: Vassar College (AB); University of York (MA, PhD)
- Occupation: Novelist
- Notable work: A True Cowboy Christmas
- Spouse: Jeff Johnson

Megan Crane (born c. 1973) is an American novelist who also writes as Caitlin Crews.

She is also one half of upmarket paranormal women's fiction author Hazel Beck.

== Background ==
She was born in Houston, Texas, and raised in Ridgewood, New Jersey. She is the granddaughter of the late Robert F. Goheen, the 16th president of Princeton University and former United States Ambassador to India and is also the great-great-granddaughter of Sir James Caruthers Rhea Ewing (1854-1925), distinguished Presbyterian missionary educator in what is now Pakistan. Crane graduated from Vassar College, and has an M.A. and Ph.D. in literature from the University of York in York, England. She is married to Jeff Johnson, the American comic book artist, animator, and one of the founders of the original Drink and Draw Social Club.

== Novels ==
Crane is the author of over 150 novels, novellas, essays, and short stories.

=== Paranormal women's fiction ===
As Hazel Beck with co-author Nicole Helm from Graydon House:

Witchlore series:

- Small Town, Big Magic (August 2022)
- Big Little Spells (August 2023)
- Truly Madly Magically (August 2024)
- Dragon Fires Everywhere (September 2025)

=== Chick lit (aka Rom Coms) and Women's fiction ===
- English as a Second Language was published by Warner Books in 2004.
- Everyone Else's Girl was published by Warner Books' 5 Spot imprint in 2005.
- Frenemies was a Book Sense Notable in July 2007. It was also nominated for an RT Book Reviews Reviewers' Choice Award in Chick Lit for 2007.
- Names My Sisters Call Me was published by Grand Central Publishing (formerly Warner Books) in 2008.
- I Love the 80s, was published by Quercus Books in the UK in March 2011 and Once More With Feeling came out from Quercus in December 2012. Both of these books were released for the North American market by Tule Publishing in 2014.

=== Contemporary romance ===
As M.M. Crane from Berkley Books:

The Fortunes of Lost Lake series:

- Bold Fortune (January 2022)
- Reckless Fortune (September 2022)

As Caitlin Crews from St. Martin's Press:

The Cold River Ranch series:

- A True Cowboy Christmas (October 2018)
- Cold Heart, Warm Cowboy (August 2019)
- The Last Real Cowboy (January 2020)

The Kittredge Ranch series, also set in Cold River, Colorado:

- Secret Nights With a Cowboy and bonus novella Sweet Nights With a Cowboy (December 2020)
- All Night Long With a Cowboy (August 2021)
- Summer Nights With a Cowboy (March 2022)

As Caitlin Crews from Harlequin's HQN imprint:

The Jasper Creek series (four stories in one, written with Jackie Ashenden, Nicole Helm, and Maisey Yates):

- A Cowboy for All Seasons (March 2020)
- A Good Old-Fashioned Cowboy (January 2020)
- Sweet Home Cowboy (March 2022)
- The Comeback Cowboy (March 2023)

As Megan Crane from Tule Publishing:

- Tempt Me, Cowboy (September 2013) was the first novella in the Copper Mountain Rodeo series, the flagship e-book project from Tule Publishing's Montana Born imprint.
- A Game of Brides (May 2014) was nominated for the Romance Writers of America RITA Award in 2015.
- Please Me, Cowboy (September 2014)
- Come Home for Christmas, Cowboy (November 2014) was part of the 2015 Montana Born Christmas boxed set that hit the USA Today Bestseller list at #78.
- In Bed with the Bachelor (March 2015)
- Her novella "Project Virgin" originally appeared in a self-published boxed set with other authors called Love Ever After, which debuted on the USA Today Bestseller List at #138. It then came out as a single title from Tule Publishing in January 2016.
- Cody (May 2017); title changed to The Most Dangerous Cowboy
- Have Yourself A Crazy Little Christmas (October 2017)
- Tempt Me Please, Cowboy (September 2023)

The Careys of Cowboy Point series:

- The Cowboy's Mail-Order Bride (May 2024)
- The Cowboy's Forbidden Bride (September 2024)
- The Cowboy's Secret Babies (February 2025)
- The Cowboy's Best Friend (Summer 2025)
- A Christmas Baby for the Cowboy (Christmas 2025)

=== Romantic suspense ===
The Alaska Force series from Berkley Books:

- SEAL's Honor (November 2018)
- Sniper's Pride (May 2019)
- Sergeant's Christmas Siege (October 2019)
- Delta Force Defender (July 2020)
- Special Ops Seduction (January 2021)

=== Biker romance ===
- Make You Burn (August 2015) Book One in the Deacons of Bourbon Street series featuring multiple authors, from Loveswept, a division of Random House. The entire Deacons of Bourbon Street series was published by Headline Eternal in the UK.
- Devil's Honor (November 2016), the first in the Devil's Keepers outlaw MC series, a spin-off of Crane's Deacons of Bourbon Street book.
- Devil's Mark (January 2017)
- Devil's Own (May 2017)

=== Dystopian Viking erotic romance ===
- Edge of Obsession (January 2016) Book One in the Edge series from St. Martin's Press.
- Edge of Temptation (April 2016)
- Edge of Control (July 2016)
- Edge of Power (March 2017)
- Edge of Ruin (August 2017) featuring three novellas set in Crane's post-apocalyptic, futuristic world, "Danger's Edge," "Need's Edge," and "Raider's Edge."

=== Harlequin category romance ===
Crane also writes romance novels for Harlequin Presents and Harlequin Historical, two category romance lines from Harlequin, as Caitlin Crews.

Her debut, Pure Princess, Bartered Bride, was published in February 2010, debuting on the USA Today Bestseller List at #112.

Subsequent novels for Presents include:

- Majesty, Mistress...Missing Heir (October 2010 in North America; May 2010 in the UK)
- Katrakis's Last Mistress (September 2010 in the UK; published as Katrakis's Sweet Prize in North America in March 2011)
- Princess from the Past (February 2011 in the UK; February 2012 in North America where the book debuted on the USA Today Bestseller List at #89)
- The Shameless Playboy (May 2011 in the UK; published as The Disgraced Playboy in North America in August 2011)
- The Replacement Wife (August 2011 in the UK; June 2012 in North America)
- Heiress Behind the Headlines (October 2011 in the UK; October 2012 in North America)
- The Man Behind the Scars (June 2012 in the UK; August 2012 in North America)
- In Defiance of Duty (June 2012 in the UK; available in e-book in North America)
- A Devil In Disguise (November 2012 in the UK; available as part of a 2in1 with Not Just The Boss's Plaything in December 2013 )
- No More Sweet Surrender (February 2013 in UK and US), which was nominated for an RT Book Reviews Reviewers' Choice Award in Harlequin Presents for 2013.
- A Royal Without Rules (August 2013 in UK and US), which was nominated for the prestigious Romance Writers of America RITA Award in 2014.
- A Scandal in the Headlines (August 2013 in the UK; November 2013 in North America), which was nominated for an RT Book Reviews Reviewers' Choice Award in Harlequin Presents for 2013.
- Not Just The Boss's Plaything (December 2013)
- Scandalize Me (June 2014), Book Two in the trade paperback Fifth Avenue Trilogy featuring three different authors
- Undone By the Sultan's Touch (August 2014), which was accorded the rare 4 1/2 Gold rating meaning: "Phenomenal. In a class by itself." by RT Book Reviews and was also nominated for an RT Book Reviews Reviewers' Choice Award in Harlequin Presents for 2014.
- His For a Price (October 2014), Book One in the Vows of Convenience series
- His For Revenge (December 2014), Book Two in the Vows of Convenience series
- At the Count's Bidding (February 2015), which was nominated for an RT Book Reviews Reviewers' Choice Award in Harlequin Presents for 2015.
- Greek's Last Redemption (May 2015)
- Protected the Desert Heir (June 2015) Book One in the Scandalous Sheikh Brides series
- The Billionaire's Innocent (June 2015 in serialized chunks; July 2015 in full) Book Three in the Forbidden Trilogy featuring three different authors
- Traded to the Desert Sheikh (September 2015) Book Two in the Scandalous Sheikh Brides series
- Unwrapping the Castelli Secret (November 2015)
- Castelli's Virgin Widow (February 2016)
- Expecting a Royal Scandal (June 2016), which was nominated for an RT Book Reviews Reviewers' Choice Award in Series Romance for 2016
- The Return of the Di Sione Wife (October 2016)
- The Guardian's Virgin Ward (December 2016)
- Bride by Royal Decree (February 2017)
- The Prince's Nine-month Scandal (June 2017) Book One in the Scandalous Royal Brides series
- The Billionaire's Secret Princess (July 2017) Book Two in the Scandalous Royal Brides series
- Undone by the Billionaire Duke (October 2017)
- A Baby to Bind His Bride (January 2018)
- Imprisoned by the Greek's Ring (April 2018)
- The Bride's Baby of Shame (July 2018) Book Two in the Stolen Brides duet with Jane Porter
- Sheikh's Secret Love-Child (November 2018) Book Four in the Bound to the Desert King quartet with three other authors
- My Bought Virgin Wife (January 2019)
- The Italian's Twin Consequences (May 2019)
- Untamed Billionaire's Innocent Bride (June 2019), which is Caitlin Crews's 50th book for Harlequin
- His Two Royal Secrets (July 2019)
- Unwrapping the Innocent's Secret (November 2019)
- Secrets of His Forbidden Cinderella (January 2020)
- The Italian's Pregnant Cinderella (April 2020)
- Claimed in the Italian's Castle (June 2020)
- Christmas in the King's Bed (October 2020)
- His Scandalous Christmas Princess (November 2020)
- Chosen for His Desert Throne (January 2021)
- The Secret That Can't Be Hidden (April 2021)
- Her Deal with the Greek Devil (May 2021)
- The Sicilian's Forgotten Wife (September 2021)
- The Bride He Stole for Christmas (November 2021)
- The Scandal That Made Her His Queen (February 2022)
- Crowning His Lost Princess (May 2022)
- Reclaiming His Ruined Princess (June 2022)
- Willed to Wed Him (September 2022)
- The Christmas He Claimed the Secretary (December 2022)
- The Accidental Accardi Heir (January 2023)
- A Secret Heir to Secure His Throne (March 2023)
- What Her Sicilian Husband Desires (June 2023)
- The Desert King's Kidnapped Virgin (September 2023)
- The Spaniard's Last-Minute Wife (October 2023)
- A Billion-Dollar Heir For Christmas (December 2023)
- Wedding Night in the King's Bed (February 2024)
- A Tycoon Too Wild to Wed (April 2024)
- Her Venetian Secret (June 2024)
- Pregnant Princess Bride (August 2024)
- Forbidden Royal Vows (September 2024)
- Greek's Christmas Heir (November 2024)
- Greek's Enemy Bride (January 2025)
- Carrying A Sicilian Secret (March 2025)
- Kidnapped for His Revenge (May 2025)
- Her Accidental Spanish Heir (June 2025), which is Caitlin's 100th book for Harlequin

Her Harlequin Historical novels include:

- Kidnapped by the Viking (April 2021)
- The Viking's Runaway Concubine (July 2022)

Crane, as Crews, also wrote nine novels for Harlequin Dare, Harlequin's short-lived erotic romance line.

- Unleashed (October 2018) Book One in the Hotel Temptation series
- Undone (December 2018) Book Two in the Hotel Temptation series
- Untamed (March 2019) Book Three in the Hotel Temptation series
- The Risk (October 2019) Book Two in a quartet with three other authors
- Teach Me (February 2020) Book One in the Filthy Rich Billionaires series
- Take Me (May 2020) Book Two in the Filthy Rich Billionaires series
- Tempt Me (August 2020) Book Three in the Filthy Rich Billionaires series
- The Pleasure Contract (April 2021) Book One in the Summer Seductions duet
- Just One More Night (June 2021) Book Two in the Summer Seductions duet

Her novella "The Reluctant Queen" appears in an anthology called A Royal Engagement (April 2011 in the UK as part of an anthology called A Royal Wedding; November 2011 in North America). She has also written a number of short stories for Presents, Dare, and Woman's World, including "His Christmas Captive" (2011), "His Wife by Christmas" (2013), "Strangers in the Sauna" (2014), "A New Leaf" (2018), "Captured by a Desert King" (2018), "Unruly" (2018), "The Prince's Runaway Bride" (2019), and "A Royal Surrender" (2024).

== Other ==
In addition to writing books, Crane has taught creative writing courses online at mediabistro and at the prestigious UCLA Extension Writers' Program. She has also contributed essays to It's a Wonderful Lie: 26 Truths About Life in Your Twenties, edited by Emily Franklin, Everything I Needed To Know About Being a Girl I Learned From Judy Blume, edited by Jennifer O'Connell, Writing the Bestseller: Romantic and Commercial Fiction, edited by Jane Porter and Rebecca Lyles, Writing the Bestseller II: Romantic and Commercial Fiction, edited by Lindsey Stover, and A Paris All Your Own: Bestselling Women Writers on the City of Light, edited by Eleanor Brown.
