= Charles A. Gillespie Jr. =

American diplomat

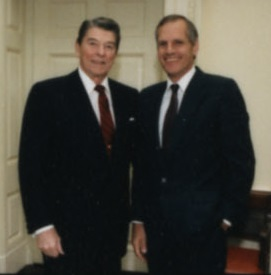
- Gillesip Jr (right) with President Ronald Reagan, 1987

United States Ambassador to Chile
- In office December 20, 1988 – December 10, 1991
- President: Ronald Reagan; George H. W. Bush
- Preceded by: Harry George Barnes Jr.
- Succeeded by: Curtis Warren Kamman

United States Ambassador to Colombia
- In office August 28, 1985 – September 19, 1988
- President: Ronald Reagan
- Preceded by: Lewis Arthur Tambs
- Succeeded by: Thomas E. McNamara

United States Ambassador to Grenada Acting
- In office February 2, 1984 – March 1984
- President: Ronald Reagan
- Preceded by: Post established
- Succeeded by: Loren Lawrence

Personal details
- Born: March 22, 1935 Long Beach, California, U.S.
- Died: March 7, 2008 (aged 72) La Jolla, California, U.S.
- Spouse: Vivian Havens (1958-2003, her death)

Charles Anthony Gillespie Jr. (March 22, 1935 – March 7, 2008) was a United States career diplomat who helped to open the first United States Embassy in Grenada. He later served as the United States Ambassador to Colombia and the United States Ambassador to Chile.

Gillespie spent over thirty years in the United States foreign service as a specialist in Latin American and Caribbean affairs. Many of his foreign assignments were to Latin American countries experiencing domestic strife. For example, Gillespie served as the interim Chargé d'Affaires during the 1983 United States Invasion of Grenada as well as in Colombia from 1985 until 1988, when the government sought to crack down on the illegal drug trade in Colombia and the Colombian drug cartels. Gillespie often received daily death threats from the Colombian cartels.

== Early life ==
Charles A. Gillespie Jr. was born on March 22, 1935, in Long Beach, California. He received his degree from UCLA in 1958. He later studied at the Maxwell School of Public Affairs at Syracuse University and the National War College in Washington, D.C.

== Career ==
Gillespie served as a United States Army officer in Europe from 1958 until 1962. He began his career in the Foreign Service in 1965, when he was made regional security officer at the Embassy of the United States in Manila in the Philippines. He was later posted in a variety of positions around the world including the United States NATO mission, Mexico City and Managua, Nicaragua.

Gillespie served as the deputy Assistant Secretary of State for the Caribbean and deputy for operations in the State Department's Inter-American Affairs Bureau from 1983 to 1985. Through this position he oversaw the opening of the first American embassy in St. George's, Grenada. Gillespie was involved in the planning of the invasion of Grenada in October 1983. It was the first major U.S. military operation since the Vietnam War. The invasion by the United States and several Caribbean nations led to the overthrow of the Grenadan military government which had executed Grenadan Prime Minister Maurice Bishop. Approximately 100 people, including 19 members of the United States armed forces were killed in the invasion.

His last posting as an ambassador was to Chile towards the end of the Augusto Pinochet regime from 1988 to 1991.

Gillespie headed the United States public relations task force to gain Congressional support for the North American Free Trade Agreement (NAFTA).

== Retirement ==
Gillespie retired from the United States Foreign Service in 1995. He became a principal member of The Scowcroft Group, an international business consulting company founded by Brent Scowcroft, the former National Security Advisor.

== Books ==
Gillespie co-authored the book Career Diplomacy: Life and Work in the U.S. Foreign Service with Harry W. Kopp. The book was published by the Georgetown University Press in October 2008.

== Death ==
Charles A. Gillespie Jr. died of cancer at the age of 72 on March 7, 2008, at Scripps Memorial Hospital in La Jolla, California. He was survived by his children, Charles and Kristin, and three grandchildren. His wife, Vivian Havens, whom he had been married to for 45 years, died in 2003.

Diplomatic posts
Preceded by Sally A. Shelton as United States Ambassador to Grenada	United States Chargé d'Affaires ad interim, Grenada; February 2, 1984 – March 1984	Succeeded by Loren E. Lawrence
Preceded by Lewis Arthur Tambs	United States Ambassador to Colombia; August 28, 1985 – September 19, 1988	Succeeded by Thomas Edmund McNamara
Preceded by Harry George Barnes Jr.	United States Ambassador to Chile; December 20, 1988 – December 10, 1991	Succeeded by Curtis Warren Kamman
