= William S. Culbertson =

American diplomat and soldier (1884–1966)

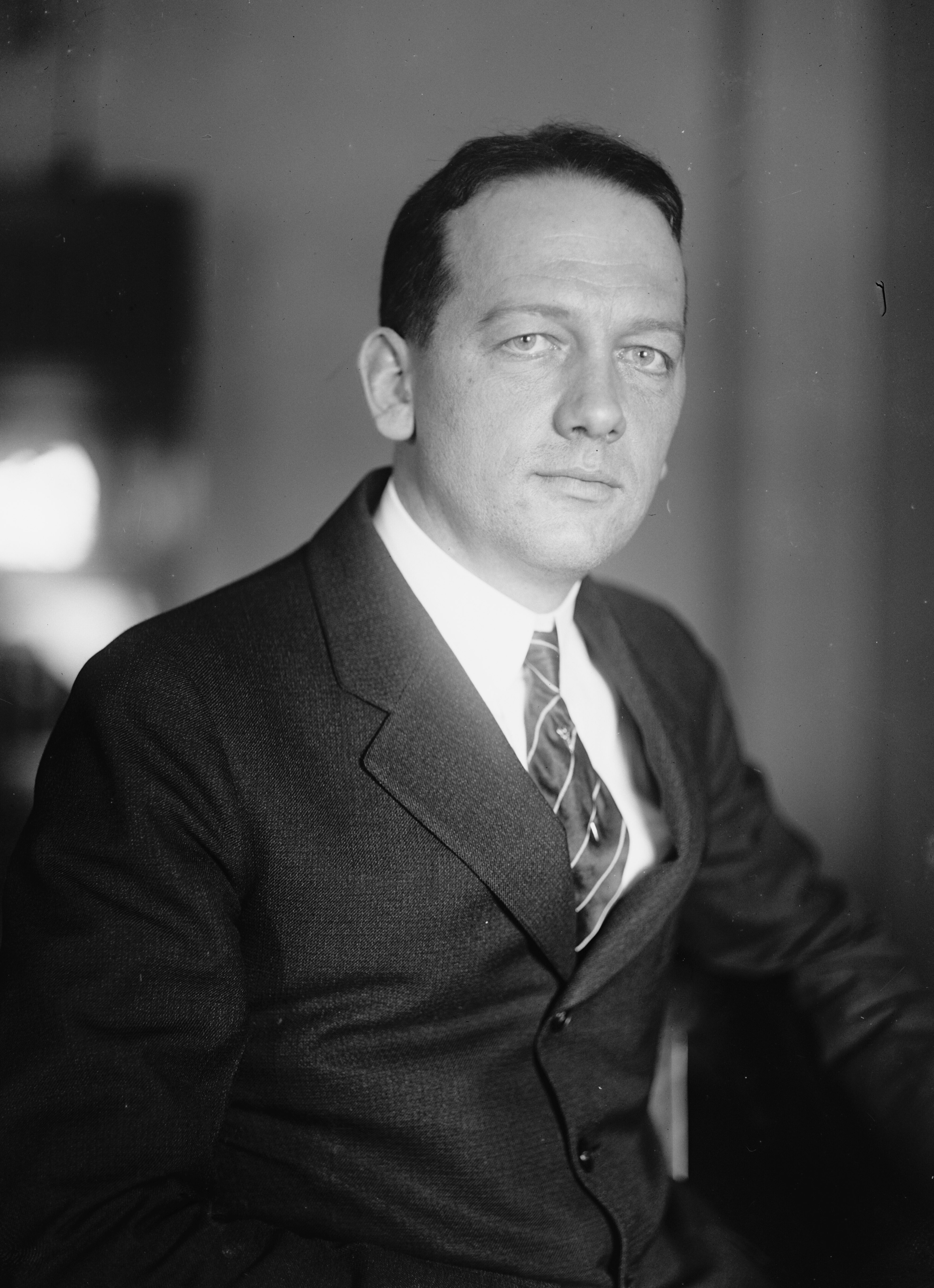
Portrait of Culbertson

William Smith Culbertson (August 5, 1884 – August 12, 1966) was an American diplomat and soldier. U.S. Ambassador, Romania, 1925–1928, Chile, 1928 – 1933. Colonel, United States Army. President, United States Tariff Commission 1922 – 1925. Member, United States Tariff Commission, 1916–1922, American Bar Association, Council on Foreign Relations, American Economic Association, Phi Alpha Delta, Phi Beta Kappa.

== Early history ==
He was born in Greensburg, Westmoreland County, Pennsylvania on August 5, 1884. He graduated from College of Emporia B.A.

== Alexander Hamilton Essay, 1910 ==
In 1910, after graduation from the Yale Law School J.D., Culbertson's 153-page essay on Alexander Hamilton was awarded the John Addison Porter Prize. The Porter Prize is awarded by The Kingsley Trust Association (The Scroll and Key Society) for a work of scholarship which, through original effort, gathers and relates facts and/or principles to make a product of general human interest. A review of this work by Worthington C. Ford appeared in September 1912. Ford reviewed the essay positively, noting nationalism is the "key-note" of the essay, lauding its "breadth and candor," but stating that "more could be made of Hamilton's own venture into a manufacturing concern..."

== William S. Culbertson Papers, 1923 ==
Culbertson was a member of the Institute of Politics, an organization that promoted the study of international problems and relations "with a view to creating a more sympathetic understanding of the ideals and policies of other nations." To carry out its ideas, the Institute of Politics in July and August 1923 held a series of roundtable conferences at Williams College, Massachusetts. In addition to the roundtable conferences, there were two open conferences, one of which was led by Culbertson who at that time was president of the U.S. Tariff Commission (now called the United States International Trade Commission). Culbertson discussed "Problems of Raw Materials and Foodstuffs in the Commercial Policies of Nations."

== International Economic Policies, A Survey of the Economics of Diplomacy, 1925 ==
In 1925, Culbertson published a book looking at post World War I economics and international interests. This book shows Culbertson's early leanings toward a U.S. foreign policy of reciprocity. According to a review by E. L. Bogart of the University of Illinois at Urbana, Culbertson spends most of the book discussing commercial treaties, tariffs, and open-door policy. Bogart believes that Culbertson truly understands the "gravity and complexity of the international problems presented by the unequal geographical distribution of raw materials and fuels." He believes that Culbertson disapproves of both laissez-faire economics and economic imperialism, instead promoting a policy of international cooperation, to be effected through an organization such as the League of Nations.

== Reciprocity, A National Policy for Foreign Trade, 1937 ==
In 1937, Culbertson published a book supporting the Hull reciprocal trade policy. According to a review by George H. E. Smith, Culbertson's thesis is that "[The United States has] become a world state... Our overseas expansion will go on whether we like it or not... Our production, our finance, and our trade then must operate on a world stage. If they are confined within our political frontiers by a narrow nationalism, no amount of governmental regulation and of governmental generosity will bring about real prosperity... I have become convinced that we cannot possibly pay out nationally except through a tremendous revival in foreign trade, both imports and exports, which in turn will stimulate and enlarge domestic trade and enterprise." The book continues by discussing the evolution of tariffs and the mechanisms through which they are made, and concludes with suggestions for a permanent foreign trade policy.

== The Culbertson Economic Mission, 1944 - 1945 ==
In the fall of 1944, Culbertson led an economic mission on behalf of the United States to North Africa and the Middle East to survey post war prospects for business. This trip also included an independent assignment to France. According to analysis by John A. DeNovo, the mission revealed a strong belief in the free market for the regulation of international trade, analyzed obstacles to U.S. business in the Middle East, and revealed a vision of expanded U.S. involvement in Middle-East affairs. DeNovo also claims that the Culbertson reports were "taken seriously by those charting American economic policies."

== Liberation, The Threat and the Challenge of Power, 1953 ==
Later in his life, Culbertson became a colonel in the United States Army, with a role of influencing the Eisenhower Administration's global politics. In 1953, he published Liberation, The Threat and the Challenge of Power, in which he contrasts policies of liberation and containment of the Soviet Union. Culbertson supports liberation as a method of avoiding preemptive war and argues that containment would do nothing to stem Soviet development of "super-weapons," but that American policies have considerable bearing on the practicality of liberation. Stefan T. Possony in a review of this work writes:

"Colonel Culbertson views liberation as just such a practical though complex working philosophy -- the danger, as he sees it, is in failing to recognize that we no longer can espouse the moral foundations of our way of life without also embracing liberation. We cannot turn our backs on a world that is half slave and hope to retain our own freedom. Such an attitude does not necessarily entail global war. Colonel Culbertson would keep his powder dry first and foremost, but he also visualizes a step-by-step use of all our vast strengths -- moral, economic, political, spiritual and legal -- in a gradual and controlled manner. Nor is he wanting for means to employ these strengths: trade, dollar power, education, cultural intercourse, technology, nuclear energy -- all these and many more would be used to improve the lot of underdeveloped peoples, to promote industrial expansion and to counter the threat of communism at home and abroad. In this respect, Colonel Culbertson must qualify as one of that small but distinguished group who anticipated President Dwight D. Eisenhower's atomic peacefare program."

Diplomatic posts
Preceded by Peter Augustus Jay	United States Ambassador to Romania; 1925–1928	Succeeded by Charles S. Wilson
Preceded by William Miller Collier	United States Ambassador to Chile; 1928–1933	Succeeded by Hal H. Sevier
