= William Miller Collier =

American diplomat (1867-1956)

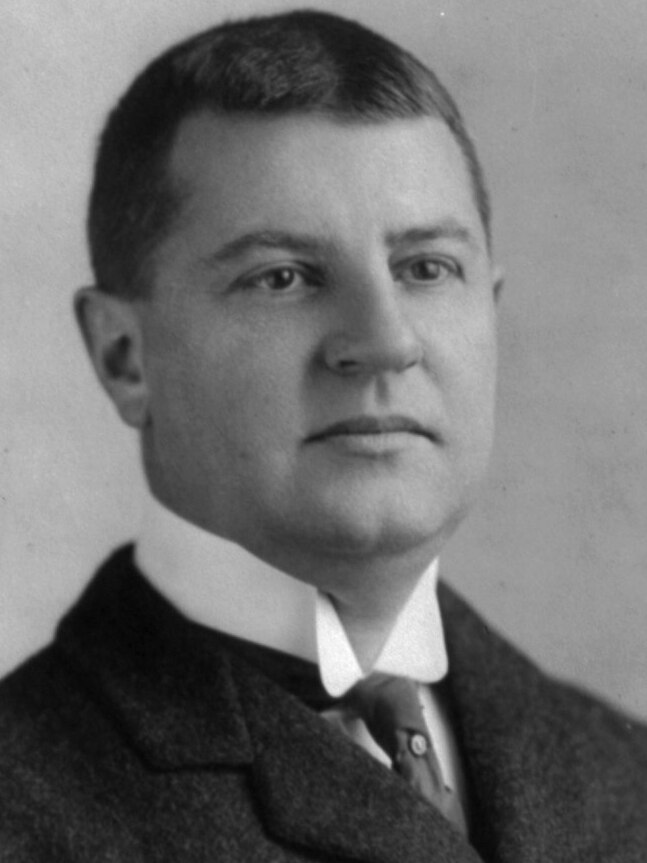

34th United States Minister to Spain
- In office March 8, 1905 – June 9, 1909
- Preceded by: Arthur S. Hardy
- Succeeded by: Henry Clay Ide

United States Ambassador to Chile
- In office 1921–1928
- Preceded by: Joseph Hooker Shea
- Succeeded by: William S. Culbertson

President of George Washington University
- In office 1918–1921
- Succeeded by: William Mather Lewis

Personal details
- Born: November 11, 1867 Lodi, New York, U.S.
- Died: April 15, 1956 (aged 88) West Caldwell, New Jersey, U.S.

William Miller Collier (November 11, 1867 – April 15, 1956) was United States Ambassador to Spain from 1905 to 1909, the president of George Washington University from 1918 to 1921, and United States Ambassador to Chile from 1921 to 1928.

== Biography ==
He was born November 11, 1867, in Lodi, New York. He graduated from Hamilton College with a B.A. in 1889 and then a M.A. in 1892. He was a member of the Chi Psi fraternity at Hamilton College.

After receiving his law degree, he was admitted to the New York State Bar Association in 1892 and he then established a law firm in Auburn, New York where he practiced until 1903. From 1903 to 1904 he worked in the office of the United States Attorney General concentrating on antitrust issues. In 1904 he was nominated to be an attorney for the Department of Commerce and Labor.

He was United States Ambassador to Spain from 1905 to 1909. He gave a series of lectures on international law at New York University Law School from 1912 to 1918. He then served as president of George Washington University from 1918 to 1921. He became the United States Ambassador to Chile from 1921 to 1928.

He died on April 15, 1956, in West Caldwell, New Jersey while visiting his niece, Mrs. James Franklin.

== Publications ==
- Collier on Bankruptcy (1898)
- Collier on Civil Service Law (1901)
- The Trusts: What Can We Do with Them — What Can They Do for Us? (1900)
- Collier on Bankruptcy (1903) fourth edition with William Horace Hotchkiss
- The Law and Practice in Bankruptcy Under the National Bankruptcy Act of 1898 (1907)
- At the Court of His Catholic Majesty (1912)
- The Influence of Lawyers in the Past and in the Future (1921)

Diplomatic posts
Preceded by Joseph Hooker Shea	United States Ambassador to Chile; 1921–1928	Succeeded by William S. Culbertson
