= List of ambassadors of the United States to Chile =

Ambassador of the United States to Chile
- Seal of the United States Department of State

- Flag of a United States ambassador

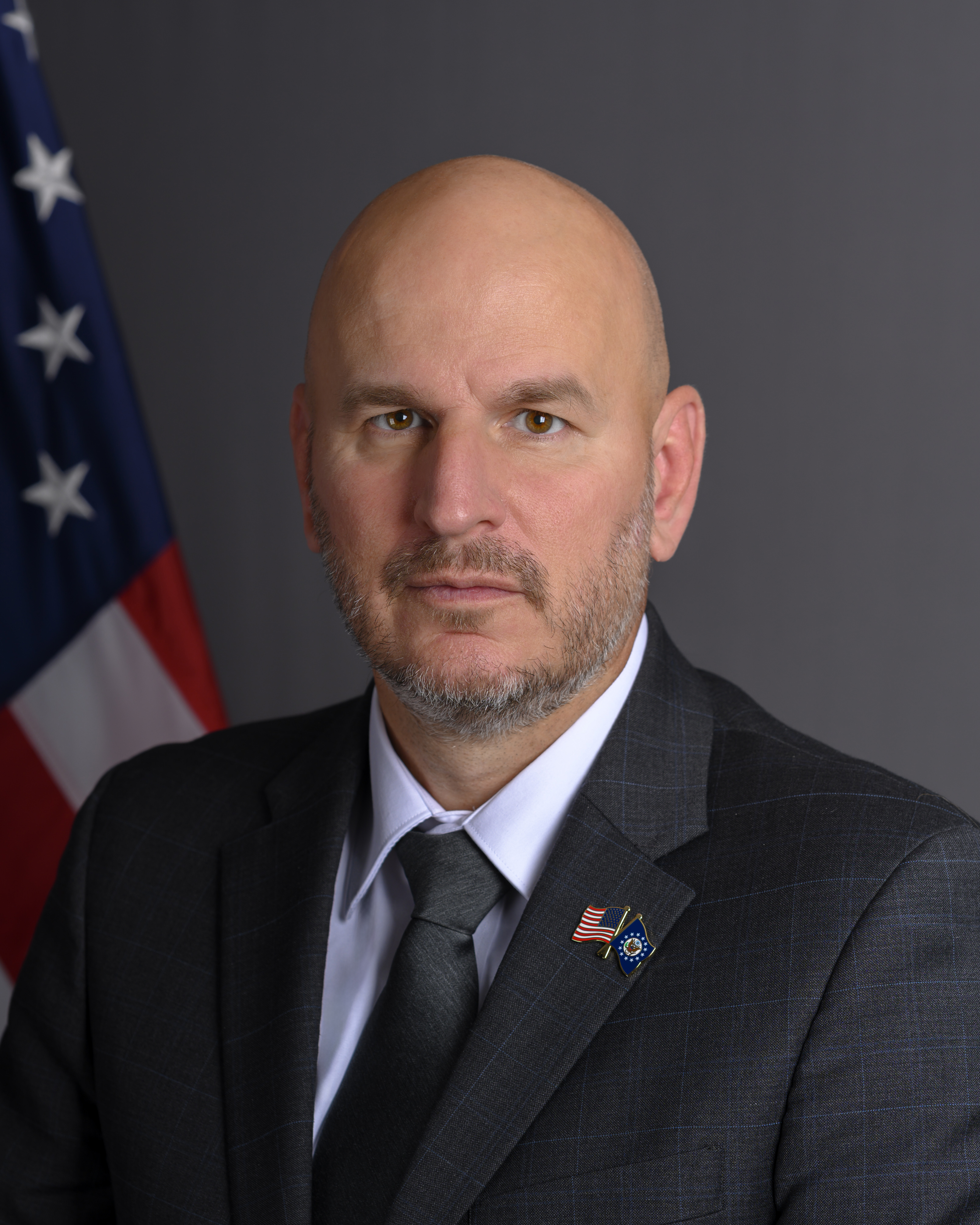
- Incumbent; Brandon Judd since November 10, 2025
- Nominator: The president of the United States
- Appointer: The president with Senate advice and consent
- Inaugural holder: Heman Allen as Ambassador Extraordinary and Minister Plenipotentiary
- Formation: April 23, 1824
- Website: U.S. Embassy - Santiago

The following is a list of ambassadors that the United States has sent to Chile. The current title given by the United States State Department to this position is Ambassador Extraordinary and Minister Plenipotentiary.

Representative	Title	Presentation of credentials	Termination of mission	Appointed by
Heman Allen	Minister Plenipotentiary	April 23, 1824	July 31, 1827	James Monroe
Samuel Larned	Chargé d'Affaires	November 9, 1828	October 29, 1829	John Quincy Adams
John Hamm	Chargé d'Affaires	May 24, 1831	October 19, 1833	Andrew Jackson
Richard Pollard	Chargé d'Affaires	March 13, 1835	May 12, 1842	Andrew Jackson
John S. Pendleton	Chargé d'Affaires	May 24, 1842	June 6, 1844	John Tyler
George William Crump	Chargé d'Affaires	August 18, 1845	November 1, 1847	James K. Polk
Seth Barton	Chargé d'Affaires	January 5, 1848	May 22, 1849	James K. Polk
Balie Peyton	Envoy Extraordinary and Minister Plenipotentiary	February 16, 1850	September 26, 1853	Zachary Taylor
David A. Starkweather	Envoy Extraordinary and Minister Plenipotentiary	November 22, 1854	August 26, 1857	Franklin Pierce
John Bigler	Envoy Extraordinary and Minister Plenipotentiary	October 5, 1857	October 4, 1861	James Buchanan
Thomas H. Nelson	Envoy Extraordinary and Minister Plenipotentiary	October 4, 1861	March 12, 1866	Abraham Lincoln
Hugh Judson Kilpatrick	Envoy Extraordinary and Minister Plenipotentiary	March 12, 1866	August 3, 1870	Andrew Johnson
Joseph P. Root	Envoy Extraordinary and Minister Plenipotentiary	December 2, 1870	June 27, 1873	Ulysses S. Grant
Cornelius A. Logan	Envoy Extraordinary and Minister Plenipotentiary	June 27, 1873	November 10, 1876	Ulysses S. Grant
Thomas A. Osborn	Envoy Extraordinary and Minister Plenipotentiary	August 28, 1877	July 25, 1881	Rutherford B. Hayes
Hugh Judson Kilpatrick	Envoy Extraordinary and Minister Plenipotentiary	July 25, 1881	December 2, 1881	James Garfield
Cornelius A. Logan	Envoy Extraordinary and Minister Plenipotentiary	September 7, 1882	June 16, 1885	Chester A. Arthur
William R. Roberts	Envoy Extraordinary and Minister Plenipotentiary	July 4, 1885	August 9, 1889	Grover Cleveland
Patrick Egan	Envoy Extraordinary and Minister Plenipotentiary	August 9, 1889	July 4, 1893	Benjamin Harrison
James D. Porter	Envoy Extraordinary and Minister Plenipotentiary	July 4, 1893	March 14, 1894	Grover Cleveland
Edward H. Strobel	Envoy Extraordinary and Minister Plenipotentiary	February 6, 1895	August 17, 1897	Grover Cleveland
Henry L. Wilson	Envoy Extraordinary and Minister Plenipotentiary	September 14, 1897	July 18, 1904	William McKinley
John Hicks	Envoy Extraordinary and Minister Plenipotentiary	October 5, 1905	May 11, 1909	Theodore Roosevelt
Thomas C. Dawson	Envoy Extraordinary and Minister Plenipotentiary	August 20, 1909	November 16, 1909	William H. Taft
Henry P. Fletcher	Envoy Extraordinary and Minister Plenipotentiary	September 9, 1910	November 19, 1914	William H. Taft
Henry P. Fletcher	Ambassador Extraordinary and Plenipotentiary	November 19, 1914	March 9, 1916	Woodrow Wilson
Joseph Hooker Shea	Ambassador Extraordinary and Plenipotentiary	May 30, 1916	May 5, 1921	Woodrow Wilson
William Miller Collier	Ambassador Extraordinary and Plenipotentiary	September 29, 1921	August 6, 1928	Warren G. Harding
William S. Culbertson	Ambassador Extraordinary and Plenipotentiary	August 16, 1928	August 19, 1933	Calvin Coolidge
Hal H. Sevier	Ambassador Extraordinary and Plenipotentiary	November 25, 1933	May 4, 1935	Franklin D. Roosevelt
Hoffman Philip	Ambassador Extraordinary and Plenipotentiary	November 7, 1935	October 31, 1937	Franklin D. Roosevelt
Norman Armour	Ambassador Extraordinary and Plenipotentiary	April 21, 1938	June 10, 1939	Franklin D. Roosevelt
Claude G. Bowers	Ambassador Extraordinary and Plenipotentiary	September 7, 1939	September 2, 1953	Franklin D. Roosevelt
Willard L. Beaulac	Ambassador Extraordinary and Plenipotentiary	November 5, 1953	May 28, 1956	Dwight D. Eisenhower
Cecil B. Lyon	Ambassador Extraordinary and Plenipotentiary	June 15, 1956	February 25, 1958	Dwight D. Eisenhower
Walter Howe	Ambassador Extraordinary and Plenipotentiary	June 1, 1958	March 15, 1961	Dwight D. Eisenhower
Robert F. Woodward	Ambassador Extraordinary and Plenipotentiary	May 5, 1961	July 6, 1961	John F. Kennedy
Charles W. Cole	Ambassador Extraordinary and Plenipotentiary	October 21, 1961	September 27, 1964	John F. Kennedy
Ralph A. Dungan	Ambassador Extraordinary and Plenipotentiary	December 10, 1964	August 2, 1967	Lyndon B. Johnson
Edward M. Korry	Ambassador Extraordinary and Plenipotentiary	October 16, 1967	October 12, 1971	Lyndon B. Johnson
Nathaniel Davis	Ambassador Extraordinary and Plenipotentiary	October 20, 1971	November 1, 1973	Richard Nixon
David H. Popper	Ambassador Extraordinary and Plenipotentiary	February 22, 1974	May 22, 1977	Gerald Ford
George W. Landau	Ambassador Extraordinary and Plenipotentiary	November 1977	January 16, 1982	Jimmy Carter
James D. Theberge	Ambassador Extraordinary and Plenipotentiary	March 8, 1982	August 2, 1985	Ronald Reagan
Harry George Barnes, Jr.	Ambassador Extraordinary and Plenipotentiary	November 18, 1985	November 26, 1988	Ronald Reagan
Charles A. Gillespie, Jr.	Ambassador Extraordinary and Plenipotentiary	December 20, 1988	December 10, 1991	Ronald Reagan
Curtis Warren Kamman	Ambassador Extraordinary and Plenipotentiary	January 14, 1992	October 21, 1994	George H. W. Bush
Gabriel Guerra-Mondragón	Ambassador Extraordinary and Plenipotentiary	November 24, 1994	June 13, 1998	Bill Clinton
John O'Leary	Ambassador Extraordinary and Plenipotentiary	August 19, 1998	June 29, 2001	Bill Clinton
William R. Brownfield	Ambassador Extraordinary and Plenipotentiary	March 25, 2002	July 19, 2004	George W. Bush
Craig A. Kelly	Ambassador Extraordinary and Plenipotentiary	September 9, 2004	November 9, 2007	George W. Bush
Paul E. Simons	Ambassador Extraordinary and Plenipotentiary	November 9, 2007	July 4, 2010	George W. Bush
Alejandro Daniel Wolff	Ambassador Extraordinary and Plenipotentiary	July 9, 2010	August 10, 2013	Barack Obama
Michael A. Hammer	Ambassador Extraordinary and Plenipotentiary	April 8, 2014	September 20, 2016	Barack Obama
Carol Z. Perez	Ambassador Extraordinary and Plenipotentiary	October 13, 2016	January 31, 2019	Barack Obama
Baxter Hunt	Chargé d’Affaires	January 31, 2019	August 10, 2020	Donald Trump
Richard H. Glenn	Chargé d’Affaires	August 10, 2020	September 13, 2022	Donald Trump
Bernadette Meehan	Ambassador Extraordinary and Plenipotentiary	September 30, 2022	January 20, 2025	Joe Biden
Richard T. Yoneoka	Chargé d’Affaires	January 20, 2025	November 10, 2025	Donald Trump
Brandon Judd	Ambassador Extraordinary and Plenipotentiary	November 10, 2025	Present	Donald Trump

== See also ==
- Ambassadors of the United States
- Chile–United States relations
- Foreign relations of Chile
- Joel Roberts Poinsett
