= Lee Hawkins (journalist) =

American journalist and musician

Lee Hawkins Jr. is an American journalist, author and musician who worked nearly 19 years at The Wall Street Journal as a reporter, editor and on-camera journalist. There, and as an independent reporter and author since 2022, Hawkins has examined the intergenerational effects of violence, trauma and resilience on Black American families and other families.

== Early life ==
Hawkins grew up in Maplewood, Minnesota. His father, Lee Hawkins, Sr., is an Alabama native. Hawkins attended the University of Wisconsin–Madison, graduating with a degree in political science.

== Journalism career ==
Hawkins began his career as a business reporter for the Milwaukee Journal Sentinel and the Wisconsin State Journal.

He was a reporter and news editor for The Wall Street Journal from June 2003 to March 2022, covering education, the auto industry and other assignments. In 2002 he was one of the lead reporters on a WSJ team that chronicled the Tulsa Massacre of 1921. The team's work was named a finalist for a Pulitzer Prize.

Hawkins did on-camera interviews for the WSJ website and its sister site WSJ Live. He has interviewed celebrities from the business, sports and entertainment worlds, in many cases for a series of segments titled The Business of Celebrity w/ Lee Hawkins. He is a regular guest on Fox Business Network.

His critically acclaimed 2024 book, I Am Nobody's Slave: How Uncovering My Family's History Set Me Free (Amistad) traced 400 years of his Black American family's history from slavery, Jim Crow apartheid and the intergenerational trauma that followed.

In 2025, for Marketplace radio (American Public Media), Hawkins created and hosted a limited-series investigation into how Northern states weaponized racial covenants, redlining and zoning to bar Black families from homeownership. That series featured the story of how entrepreneur James Hughes broke those barriers in 1948, opening a St. Paul, MN, suburb to hundreds of Black and brown families and seeding intergenerational wealth.

Hawkins coined the term "NEWBOs", or "New Black Overclass", to describe a younger generation of wealthy and business-savvy African-American celebrities. In 2009 he presented the CNBC special NEWBOs: The Rise of the New Black Overclass, which profiled LeBron James, Kirk Franklin and Terrell Owens, among others.

Hawkins is a member of the National Association of Black Journalists.

== Musical career ==
Hawkins won the John Lennon Songwriting Contest in the R&B category in 2011 for his song "I Love You Woman". In 2012 he released the album Midnight Conversations, which included the song.

Hawkins had an on-camera interview with children's music group The Wiggles in 2013 in which he ended up singing with the group. They invited him to sing onstage with them several days later. He then appeared on their 2014 DVD Wiggle House and was a guest singer (on "This Little Piggy Went to Market") on their 2014 album Apples and Bananas.

In 2015 Hawkins released the Christmas album Songs About the Birth of Jesus, in which he sings with his father.

== Publications ==
I Am Nobody's Slave: How Uncovering My Family's History Set Me Free. Amistad. ISBN 978-0-06-282316-8. 2024.
