= Donald M. Campbell Jr. =

United States Army General

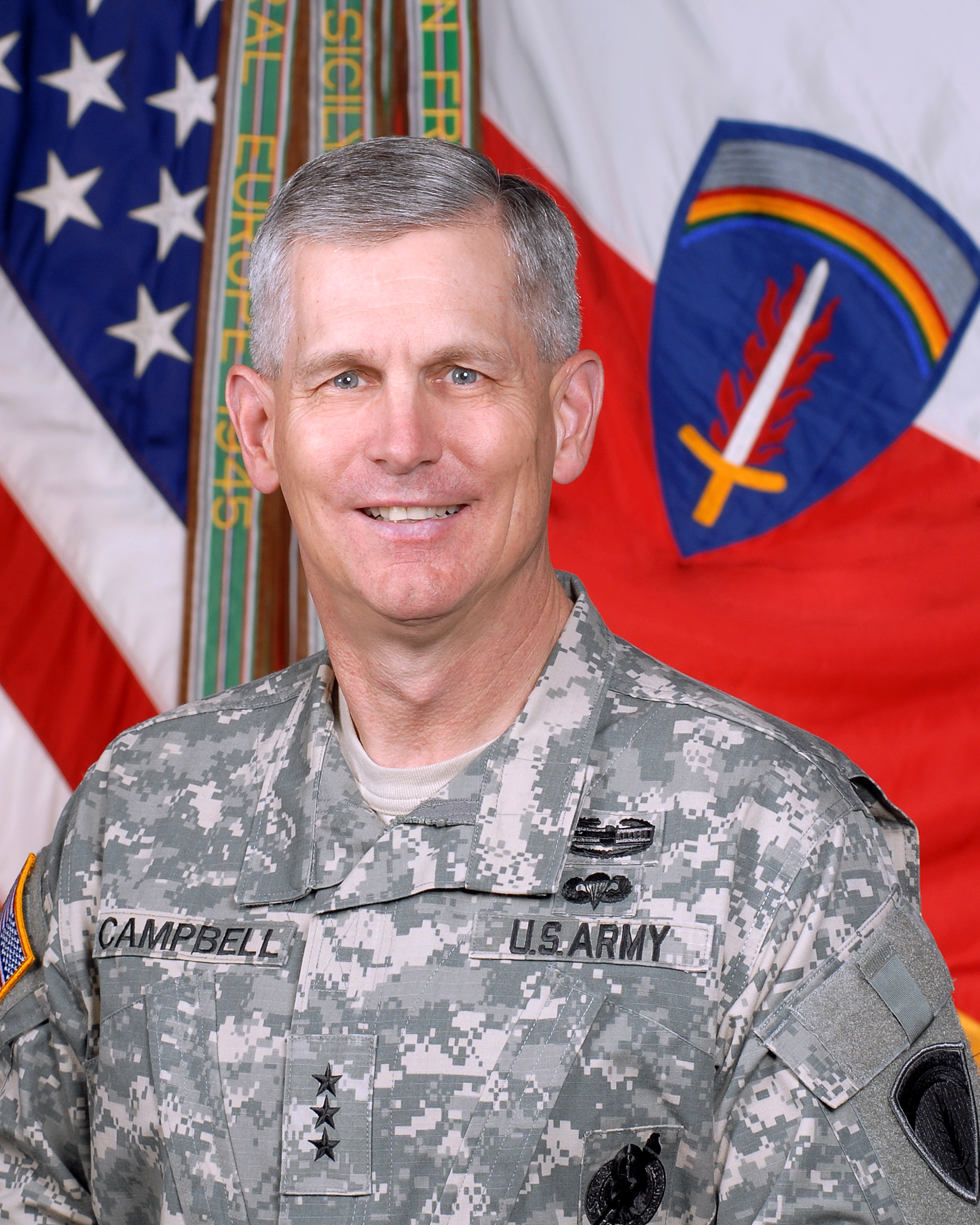
- Lieutenant General Donald M. Campbell Jr.
- Born: January 3, 1956 (age 70)
- Military career
- Allegiance: United States
- Branch: United States Army
- Service years: 1978–2014
- Rank: Lieutenant General
- Nickname: Don
- Commands: United States Army Europe; III Corps; United States Army Recruiting Command; United States Army Armor Center; 1st Brigade, 4th Infantry Division
- Conflicts: Iraq War
- Awards: Army Distinguished Service Medal (4); Legion of Merit (4); Bronze Star Medal (2)

Lieutenant General Donald M. Campbell Jr. (born January 3, 1955) is a retired United States Army lieutenant general who served as the commanding general of United States Army Europe. He commanded the United States Army Europe from December 1, 2012, to November 6, 2014.

== Military career ==
Campbell is a graduate of Kansas State University. Commissioned an armor officer in May 1978, his initial assignment was with the 2nd Battalion, 63rd Armor at Fort Riley, Kansas, where he served as a Tank Platoon Leader, Company Executive Officer, Battalion S1/Adjutant and Company Commander

In June 1984, Campbell was assigned as a G1 (Personnel) Staff Officer at the 8th Infantry Division in Bad Kreuznach, Germany. In 1985, he was reassigned as the S3/Operations Officer for 4th Battalion, 69th Armor Regiment in Mainz, Germany. He was then selected as the Aide-de-Camp to the Commanding General, 8th Infantry Division in Bad Kreuznach. In June 1987, Campbell was reassigned to Armor Branch, U.S. Army Military Personnel Center in Alexandria, Virginia, later renamed U.S. Army Personnel Command, where he served as the captains' and later the majors' Assignment Officer of the Armor Branch, Combat Arms Division.

Following graduation from the Command and General Staff College at Fort Leavenworth in June 1991, Campbell was assigned as the G3 (Operations) Chief of Plans Officer for 1st Infantry Division at Fort Riley, Kansas. He was then assigned as the Executive Officer for the 4th Battalion, 37th Armor Regiment, and later the 2nd Brigade S3/Operations Officer. In June 1994, Campbell was selected to serve as the Executive Officer to the Commanding General, PERSCOM. After he was selected for battalion command, Campbell served as the G3 (Operations) Assistant Training Officer for I Corps at Fort Lewis, Washington. In January 1996, he assumed command of 1st Battalion, 33rd Armor Regiment, a part of 3rd Brigade, 2nd Infantry Division at Fort Lewis. Campbell next served as the Deputy Brigade Commander of 3rd Brigade, 2nd Infantry Division. His following assignment was as the deputy director of Staff Operations for the Supreme Headquarters Allied Powers Europe in Mons, Belgium. He assumed command of the 1st Brigade, 4th Infantry Division, in June 2001, with the "Raider Brigade" as a key element in Task Force Ironhorse operations during Operation Iraqi Freedom. Following brigade command, he served as the Chief of Staff for 4th Infantry Division until June 2004.

Campbell then served as Deputy Commanding General-West for U.S. Army Recruiting Command from July 2004 through May 2005. In June 2005, he was selected to serve as the Chief of Staff, V Corps with duty as the Multi-National Corps Iraq Chief of Staff from January through December 2006. In July 2007 he assumed duties as the Deputy Commanding General, I Corps. Before assuming command of the U.S. Army Recruiting Command in May 2009, he was Commanding General, U.S. Army Armor Center and Fort Knox.

On March 10, 2011, it was announced that Campbell would take over as the III Corps and Fort Hood Commanding General from Lieutenant General Robert Cone. Campbell took command of III Corps in Fort Hood, TX in April 2011. He held this position until November 2012 when he relinquished command to go take charge of United States Army Europe, newly headquartered in Wiesbaden, Germany.

Campbell is a graduate of the Armor Officer Basic Course, Infantry Officer Advanced Course, U.S. Army Command and General Staff College, and the U.S. Army War College. He holds a master's degree in Administration from Central Michigan University.

Campbell planned to move to North Carolina, where he and his wife owned a house.

== Later life ==
He endorsed Joe Biden in the 2020 U.S. presidential election in an op-ed with Ambassador Robert A. Mandell and Lieutenant General Ben Hodges

In the 2024 United States presidential election, Campbell endorsed Kamala Harris.

== Awards and decorations ==
Campbell's decorations include:

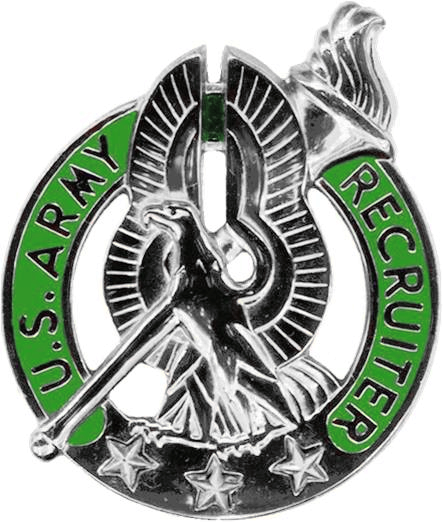
Parachutist Badge
Combat Action Badge
Recruiter Badge

- Army Distinguished Service Medal with three Oak Leaf Clusters
- Legion of Merit with three Oak Leaf Clusters
- Bronze Star Medal with V device and one Oak Leaf Cluster
- Defense Meritorious Service Medal
- Meritorious Service Medal with a silver Oak Leaf Cluster
- Army Commendation Medal with two Oak Leaf Clusters
- Army Achievement Medal with one Oak Leaf Cluster

Military offices
Preceded by Robert W. Cone	Commanding General of III Corps; 2011–2012	Succeeded by Mark A. Milley
Preceded by Mark Hertling	Commanding General, United States Army Europe; 2012–2014	Succeeded by Frederick Hodges
