= Cynthia Stroum =

American diplomat

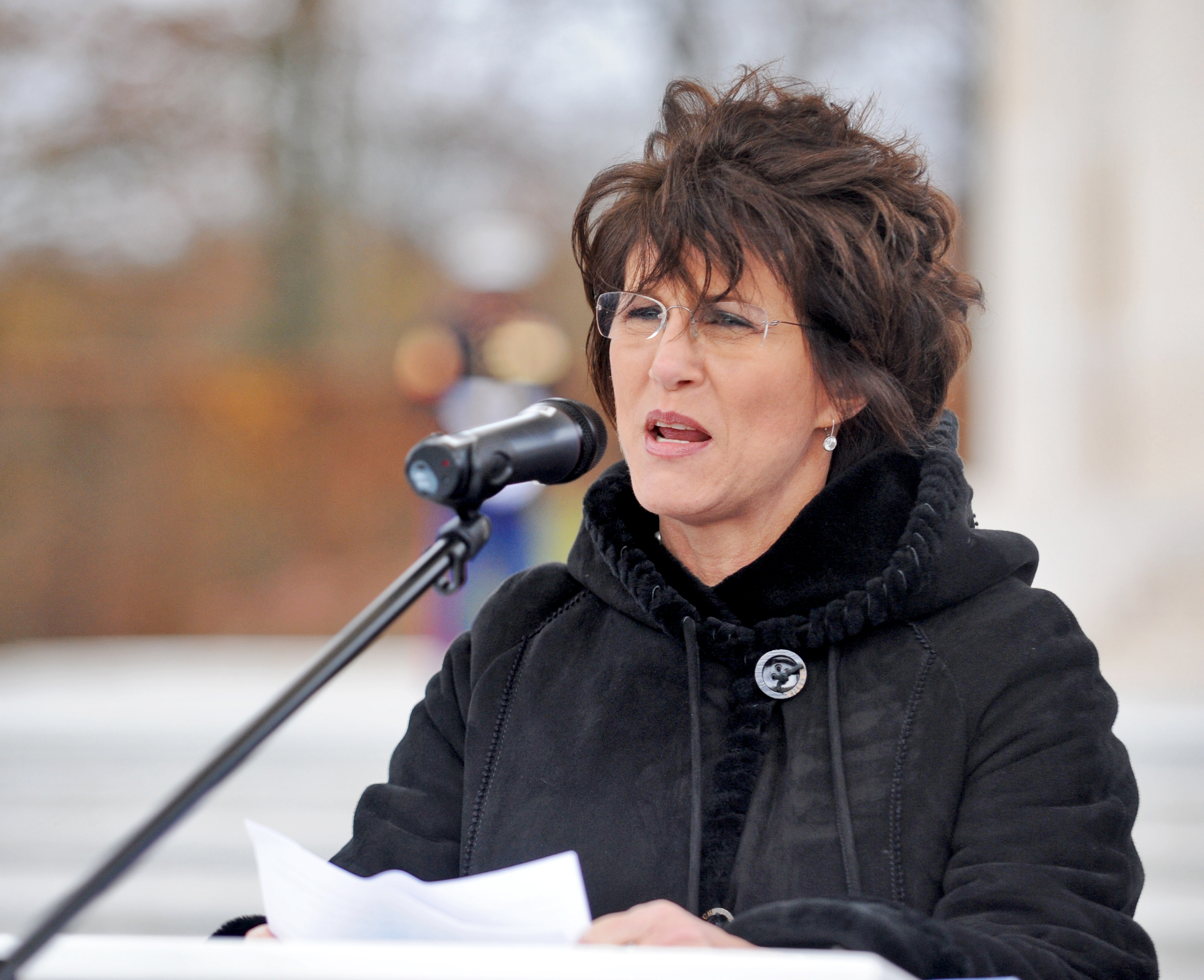

United States Ambassador to Luxembourg
- In office December 7, 2009 – January 31, 2011
- President: Barack Obama
- Preceded by: Ann Wagner
- Succeeded by: Robert A. Mandell

Personal details
- Born: 1950 (age 75–76) Seattle, Washington, U.S.
- Education: University of Southern California (BA)

Cynthia Stroum (born 1950) is an American diplomat and political donor who served as the United States Ambassador to Luxembourg from December 7, 2009 to January 31, 2011.

== Background and education ==
Stroum was born to a wealthy, well-known philanthropic Jewish family in Seattle. She received a Bachelor of Arts in Public Relations and Journalism from the University of Southern California, and worked in the TV and film industries. She was a major donor to Maria Cantwell and Patty Murray from her home state of Washington, and to the Barack Obama 2008 presidential campaign.

== Management of Embassy Luxembourg controversy ==
Inspectors from the State Department Inspector General's office visited the Embassy of the United States, Luxembourg in October and November 2010. According to their report, released two weeks after Stroum announced her resignation, her "confrontational management style, chronic gaps in senior and other staffing caused by curtailments, and the absence of a sense of direction have brought major elements of Embassy Luxembourg to a state of dysfunction." The report also criticized Stroum for spending excessive time supervising the repair of the ambassador's residence and for obtaining an improper reimbursement for the purchase of a mattress. In addition, there were apparently large unwarranted purchases made for wine and liqueur according to an article in The Washington Post on February 4, 2011.

Diplomatic posts
Preceded by Ann Wagner	United States Ambassador to Luxembourg; 2009–2011	Succeeded by Robert A. Mandell
