= Dolibois =

Dolibois may refer to:

- Dolibois House, locale of the Embassy of the United States, Luxembourg
- Dolibois European Center, an overseas campus of Miami University, and based in Differdange, in south-western Luxembourg
- John E. Dolibois (1918–2014), American diplomat, Ambassador to Luxembourg (1981–1985)
