= Ben Hodges =

United States Army officer (born 1958)

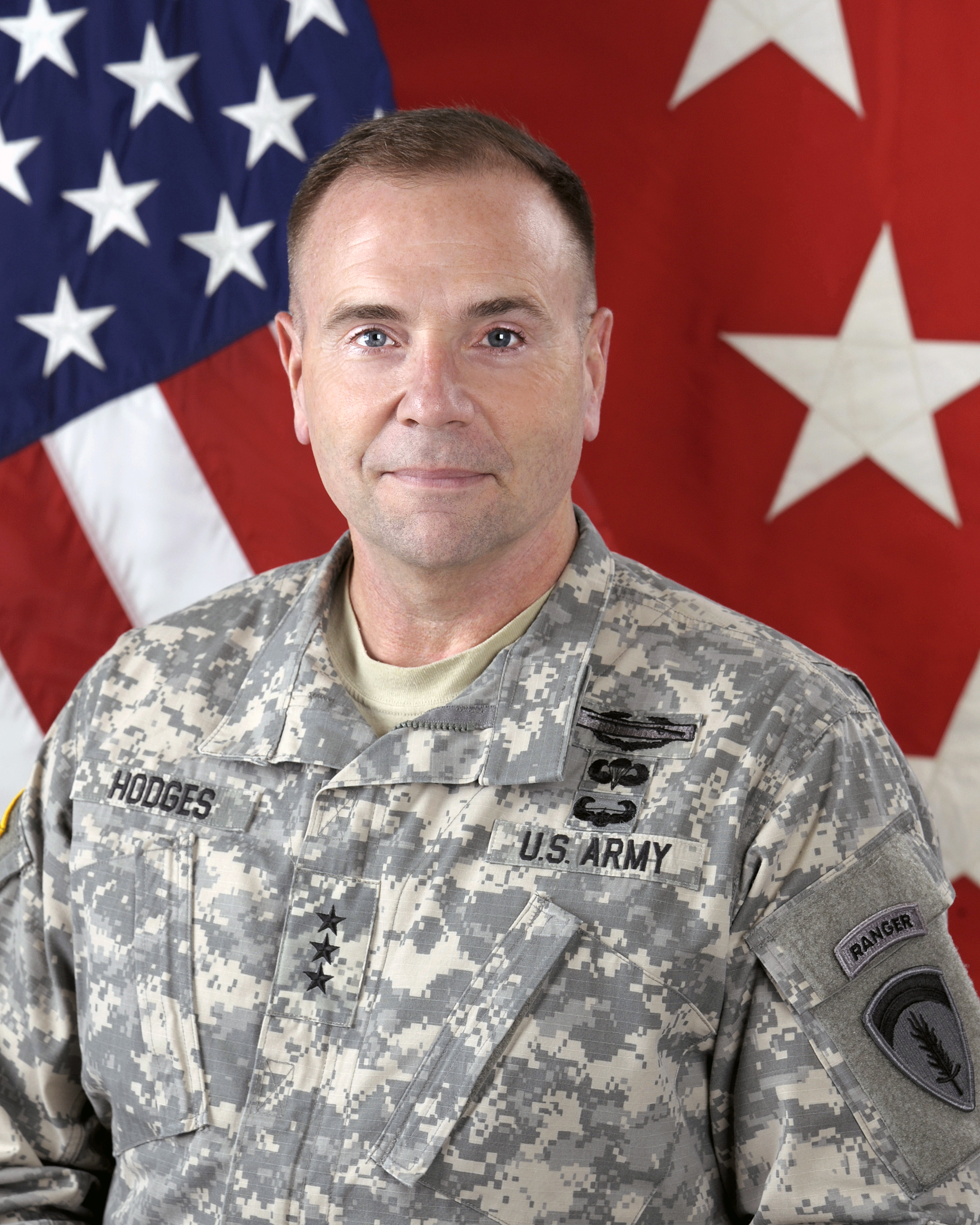
- Born: April 16, 1958 (age 68); Jacksonville, Florida, U.S.
- Military career
- Allegiance: United States
- Branch: United States Army
- Service years: 1980–2018
- Rank: Lieutenant general
- Commands: United States Army Europe; Allied Land Command; Pakistan Afghanistan Coordination Cell; 1st Brigade, 101st Airborne Division
- Conflicts: Iraq War; War in Afghanistan
- Awards: Defense Distinguished Service Medal; Army Distinguished Service Medal; Defense Superior Service Medal; Legion of Merit (3); Bronze Star Medal (4)

Frederick Benjamin "Ben" Hodges III (born April 16, 1958) is a retired United States Army officer who served as commanding general, United States Army Europe. He previously held the Pershing Chair in Strategic Studies at the Center for European Policy Analysis.

A 1980 United States Military Academy graduate, Hodges became an infantry officer, serving as a platoon leader and company executive officer in the 2nd Armored Division (Forward) in Germany. After completing the Infantry Officer Advanced Course in 1984, he served with the 101st Airborne Division. In March 1989 Hodges became an instructor at the U.S. Army Infantry School at Fort Benning, Georgia. He studied at the Command and General Staff College at Fort Leavenworth, Kansas and graduated from the School of Advanced Military Studies also at Fort Leavenworth in 1993, becoming G-3 (Chief of Plans) of the 2nd Infantry Division in South Korea.

Hodges served as a battalion executive officer with the 101st Airborne before becoming aide-de-camp to the Supreme Allied Commander Europe in August 1995. He became a battalion commander in the 101st Airborne Division in 1997. He was the Congressional Liaison Officer at the Office of the Chief of Legislative Liaison between 1999 and 2000. After graduating from the National War College in 2001, Hodges served at the Joint Readiness Training Center at Fort Polk, Louisiana. Taking command of the 1st Brigade of the 101st Airborne in 2002, Hodges led the brigade in Operation Iraqi Freedom.

In 2004, Hodges became G-3 of the XVIII Airborne Corps and later simultaneously served as CJ3 of Multi-National Corps – Iraq. He became chief of staff of the XVIII Airborne Corps and was the deputy chief of the legislative liaison in the office of the Secretary of the Army beginning in 2007. In August 2009, he became director of operations of Regional Command South in Afghanistan. In December 2010, Hodges became director of the Pakistan Afghanistan Coordination Cell at the Joint Staff and in November 2012 took command of Allied Land Command. He became commander of United States Army Europe in November 2014, holding the position for three years until he retired from the U.S. Army in January 2018.

== Early life and education ==
Hodges was born on April 16, 1958 in Jacksonville, Florida, the son of a U.S. Army veteran and life insurance agent Frederick Benjamin Hodges Jr. and Nell Davis Hodges. He graduated from James A. Shanks High School in Quincy, Florida, in 1976. He graduated in early May from the United States Military Academy with a commission in the infantry.

== Career ==
In February 1981, Hodges became a platoon leader in A Company of the 3d Battalion, 41st Infantry (Mechanized), 2nd Armored Division, stationed in Germany. On November 28, he was promoted to first lieutenant. Hodges later became an executive officer in the company, serving there until March 1984. He was promoted to captain on February 1. He took the Infantry Officer Advanced Course at the United States Army Infantry School, completing it in September.

In December 1984, Hodges became assistant S-4 of the 101st Airborne Division's 1st Brigade. He later became brigade assistant S-3. In May 1986, he took command of C Company of the 1st Battalion, 327th Infantry of the division. He later became S-3 of the battalion. Between July 1988 and March 1989 Hodges served as assistant S-3 of the division's 1st Brigade. In March, he became a small group instructor at the United States Army Infantry School. He was later Chief of the Tactics Team there. In August 1991, he became a student at the Command and General Staff College, being promoted to major on September 1. Hodges later graduated from the School of Advanced Military Studies. In June 1993, he became chief of the Plans Division and G-3 of the 2nd Infantry Division in South Korea.

In July 1994, Hodges became executive officer of the 327th Infantry's 3d Battalion. He became aide-de-camp to the Supreme Allied Commander Europe in August 1995, serving there until June 1997.

On July 1, 1996 he was promoted to lieutenant colonel. In June 1997, Hodges took command of the 3d Battalion of the 187th Infantry with the 101st Airborne. He was Congressional Liaison Officer at the Office of the Chief of Legislative Liaison between July 1999 and July 2000. In August of that year he entered the National War College, graduating in June 2001. In July Hodges became Senior Battalion Observer and Controller of the Operations Group at the Joint Readiness Training Center at Fort Polk. On March 1, 2002 he was promoted to colonel.

=== Iraq and Afghanistan ===
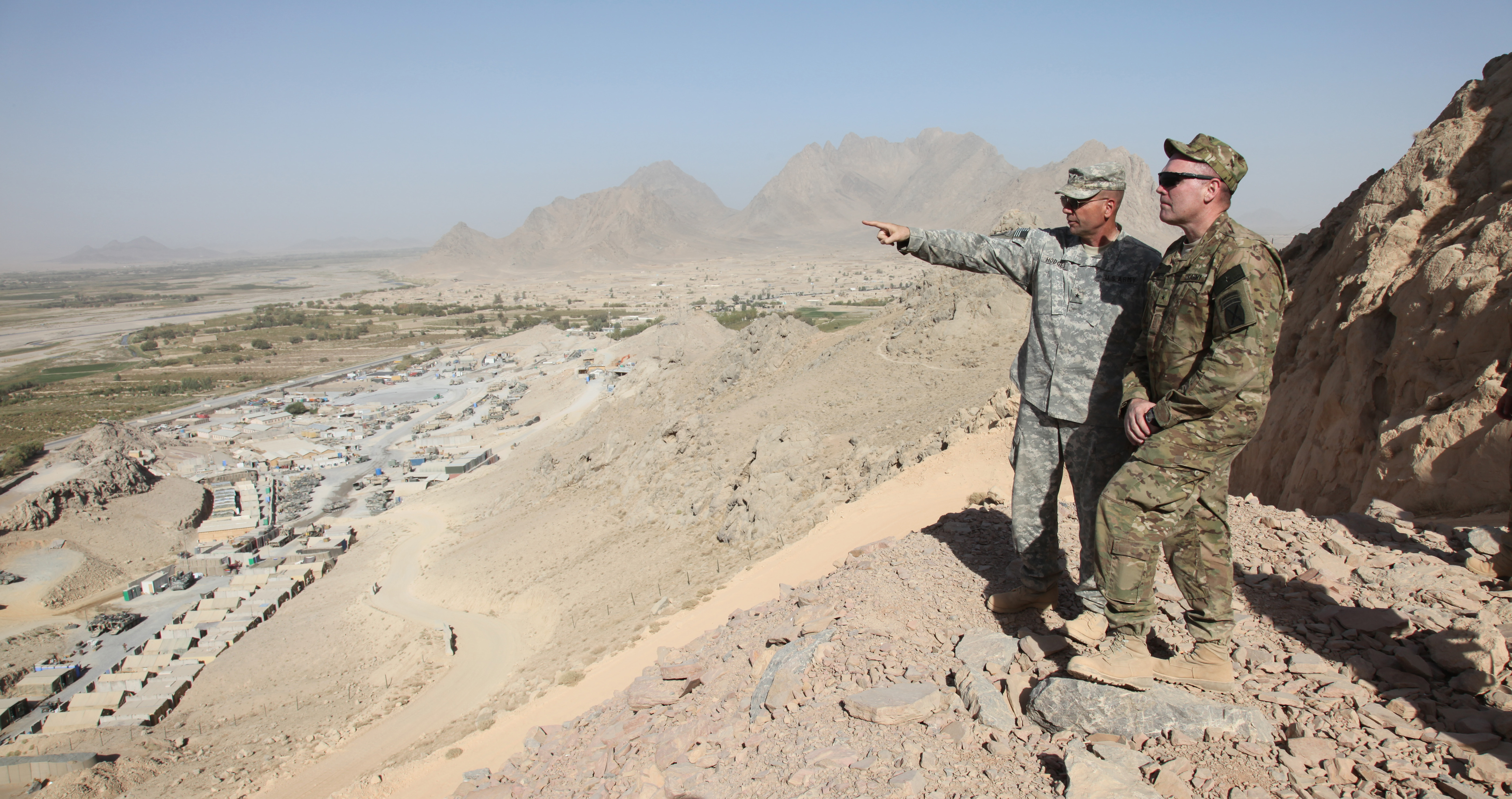
Hodges and Jeffrey L. Bannister in Kandahar, Afghanistan, 2010

In June 2002, Hodges took command of the 101st Airborne's 1st Brigade, leading it in Operation Iraqi Freedom. On March 23, 2003, before the start of the operation, Sergeant Hassan Akbar attacked other soldiers of the brigade, killing two and injuring fourteen. Hodges suffered a minor shrapnel wound in the attack and testified at Akbar's court-martial in April 2005. The brigade fought in the Battle of Najaf in late March and early April.

In August 2004, Hodges became assistant chief of staff and G-3 of the XVIII Airborne Corps. Between January 2005 and January 2006 he simultaneously served as assistant chief of staff and CJ3 of Multi-National Corps – Iraq. In July, Hodges became chief of staff of the XVIII Airborne Corps. In August 2007, he became deputy chief of Legislative Liaison at the Office of the Secretary of the Army.

=== General staff ===
On May 14, 2008, he was promoted to brigadier general. In August 2009, Hodges became director of operations of Regional Command South in Afghanistan.

In December 2010 he became director of the Pakistan Afghanistan Coordination Cell at the Joint Staff. Hodges was promoted to major general on February 2, 2011. On September 22, 2012 he was promoted to lieutenant general. On November 30, 2012, Hodges became the first commander of NATO's Allied Land Command. Hodges replaced Lieutenant General Donald M. Campbell Jr. in command of United States Army Europe on November 5, 2014.

Hodges retired from the army and relinquished command of USAREUR on December 15, 2017.

== Awards and decorations ==
Hodges is a recipient of the following awards and decorations:

Combat Infantryman Badge
Ranger tab
Basic Parachutist Badge
Air Assault Badge
United States Army Europe Badge
Joint Chiefs of Staff Identification Badge
Army Staff Identification Badge
101st Airborne Division Combat Service Identification Badge
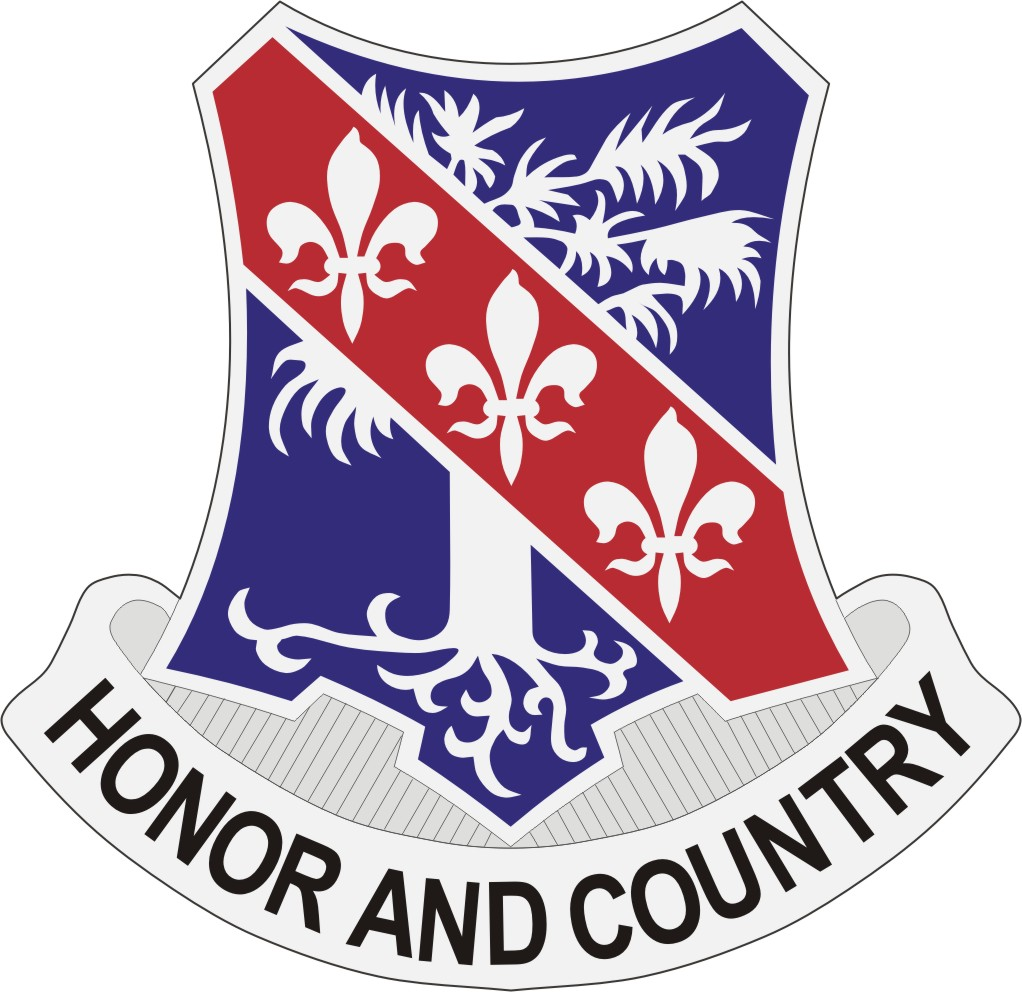
327th Infantry Regiment Distinguished Member of the Regiment
6 Overseas Service Bars

Defense Distinguished Service Medal
Army Distinguished Service Medal
Defense Superior Service Medal
Legion of Merit with two bronze oak leaf clusters
Bronze Star Medal with "V" device and three oak leaf clusters
Defense Meritorious Service Medal
Meritorious Service Medal with one silver and one bronze oak leaf clusters
Army Commendation Medal with oak leaf cluster
Army Achievement Medal with two oak leaf clusters
Joint Meritorious Unit Award
Meritorious Unit Commendation
National Defense Service Medal with one bronze service star
Iraq Campaign Medal
Global War on Terrorism Expeditionary Medal
Global War on Terrorism Service Medal
Korea Defense Service Medal
Army Service Ribbon
Army Overseas Service Ribbon
Badge of Honour of the Bundeswehr in gold (Germany)
Order of the White Lion, Commander (Czech Republic)
Czech and Slovak Transatlantic Award (Czech Republic)
Order of the Golden Fleece (Georgia)
Order of Merit of the Republic of Poland

== Later life ==
Hodges retired to Florida and began working for the Center for European Policy Analysis, a think tank, becoming the Pershing Chair in Strategic Studies. At CEPA, Hodges advocates for a stronger NATO. On defense expenditures, Hodges said, “We need a more sophisticated approach to the spending guideline. The 2-percent number gets tossed around like dues in a club, which is unhelpful... I think the Alliance should take a hard look at the 2-percent calculus to redefine it.”

He argued for including dual-use infrastructure in the 2-percent, a "win-win" that would address "the most urgent problem in European security" in military mobility, while also offering benefits to civilian life. Speaking of Iran, Hodges said, "I was disappointed that we were leaving the agreement with Iran. Not because it's a good deal, but because cooperation with our allies is very important... It worries me when we show contempt for such important allies as Great Britain, Germany or France. The cohesion of our nations was our strength and advantage. Considering all the factors, one must remember that one must not stand against the allies." He is in favor of placing greater priority on the Black Sea region.

His comments on NATO and European security appeared in several international media outlets including an interview on LNK Info TV in Lithuania, one with Anne Will, and articles in the Frankfurter Allgemeine Zeitung in Germany. In a BBC interview, Hodges said that Brexit could threaten the NATO alliance. He co-authored a book with General John R. Allen and Julian Lindley-French, Future War and the Defence of Europe, in 2021. Hodges endorsed Joe Biden in the 2020 U.S. presidential election in an op-ed with Ambassador Robert A. Mandell and Lieutenant General Donald M. Campbell Jr. He has spoken about the 1st South Carolina Volunteer Infantry Regiment (Colored). As of 2018, he is an advisory board member of Spirit of America, a 501(c)(3) organization.

Hodges's commentary on foreign militaries like his assessment on the strategic weaknesses of Russia's armed forces has been distributed by news agencies such as Times Radio. In September 2022, he penned an op-ed for The Daily Telegraph in which he argued that Russia would lose in its war against Ukraine at a comprehensive level which will be followed by the disintegration of the Russian Federation. He labeled the failures of governance under President Vladimir Putin as the trigger of a "crisis of confidence" without an easy or simple outcome.

In October 2023, Hodges claimed that Russia was working with Iran to orchestrate the Gaza war. In November 2023, he opposed a permanent ceasefire in the Gaza war.

Hodges was Senior Advisor to Human Rights First from 2022 to 2023, and served as Senior Mentor for Logistics at NATO from 2022 to 2024.

== Personal life ==
Hodges has two adult children and speaks German. He endorsed Janelle Stelson in her 2024 run for Senate and Kamala Harris in the 2024 United States presidential election.

== See also ==
- Renew Democracy Initiative
