= George Platt Waller =

American diplomat

Honorable George Platt Waller Jr.
- George Platt Waller Jr. in 1946
- Born: September 7, 1889; Montgomery, Alabama
- Died: February 26, 1962 (aged 72)
- Education: Marion Military Institute; University of Virginia
- Occupation: United States Consul
- Years active: 1913–?
- Political party: Democratic
- Awards: Order of the Redeemer (Knight); Luxembourg War Cross

George Platt Waller Jr. (September 7, 1889 – February 26, 1962) was an American diplomat and the United States chargé d'affaires in Luxembourg during World War II.

== Biography ==
=== Early life ===
George Platt Waller Jr. was born to George Platt and Susan Theresa Jones in Montgomery, Alabama on September 7, 1889. He was home schooled and attended public school until he enrolled in Marion Military Institute in 1905 until 1907. Afterwards he attended the University of Virginia, graduating in 1912. He worked as a principal of a high school in Chilhowie, Virginia from 1912 to 1913.

=== Diplomatic career ===
Waller was appointed American vice-consul in Yarmouth, Nova Scotia on February 13, 1913. From there he was appointed vice-consul in Karlsbad, Bohemia in July 1914. Waller quickly requested a transfer after Austria-Hungary entered World War I. Finding himself unable to remain neutral and yet express the sympathy necessary for a wartime post, Waller hoped to be sent to a post "in an English–speaking country outside of Canada." He wrote to his superiors that "On the other hand, by heredity, environment and ways of thought, my sympathies are, in the larger sense, fully with the Anglo Saxons and in a time like the present I am quite sure that I should be of vastly greater service among such a people." The State Department considered the request for several months, until the transfer was finally approved by Secretary of State Robert Lansing. The decision was urged by Consul Wallace J. Young and Ambassador Frederic Courtland Penfield, the latter considering Waller's attitude "seriously embarrassing." Waller was subsequently moved and served as senior vice-consul in Athens, Greece from 1915 to 1919.

Waller acted as vice-consul in-charge in Athens from October 1916 to May 1917 while Greece was embroiled in conflict. On December 4, 1919, he was made Knight of the Order of the Redeemer by Alexander of Greece and the Greek government. He later served as consul in Dresden, Germany.

Waller became the American chargé d'affaires in Luxembourg in 1931. He was awarded the Luxembourg War Cross on June 24, 1946. On June 24, 1948, Waller finalized the purchase of the estate that eventually became the American Embassy in Luxembourg. He shortly thereafter left the country permanently.

== Works ==
- Platt Waller, George (2012). Fletcher, Willard Allen; Fletcher, Jean Tucker (eds.). Defiant Diplomat: George Platt Waller, American Consul in Nazi-Occupied Luxembourg, 1939–1941. Newark: University of Delaware Press. ISBN 978-1611493986.
