= Stop Advertising Victims of Exploitation Act of 2014 =

- Long title: To amend title 18, United States Code, to provide a penalty for knowingly selling advertising that offers certain commercial sex acts.
- Acronyms (colloquial): SAVE Act of 2014
- Announced in: the 113th United States Congress
- Sponsored by: Rep. Ann Wagner (R, MO-2)
- Number of co-sponsors: 0

Codification
- U.S.C. sections affected: 18 U.S.C. § 1591, 18 U.S.C. ch. 77, 18 U.S.C. § 1596, 18 U.S.C. § 1591A

Legislative history
- Introduced in the House as H.R. 4225 by Ann Wagner (R–MO) on March 13, 2014; Committee consideration by United States House Committee on the Judiciary, United States House Judiciary Subcommittee on Crime, Terrorism, Homeland Security and Investigations

The Stop Advertising Victims of Exploitation Act of 2014 (H.R. 4225; SAVE Act of 2014) is a bill that would prohibit knowingly benefitting financially from, receiving anything of value from, or distributing advertising that offers a commercial sex act in a manner that violates federal criminal code prohibitions against sex trafficking of children or of any person by force, fraud, or coercion. The bill would make it a felony to post prostitution ads online.

The bill was introduced into the United States House of Representatives during the 113th United States Congress.

== Background ==
Human trafficking is the modern form of slavery, with illegal smuggling and trading of people, for forced labour or sexual exploitation. Trafficking is officially defined as the recruitment, transportation, transfer, harboring, or receipt of persons by means of coercion, abduction, fraud, deception, or abuse of power of a position of vulnerability for the purpose of exploitation. Human trafficking is not synonymous with forced migration or smuggling. In the U.S., human trafficking tends to occur around international travel-hubs with large immigrant populations, notably California and Texas. The U.S. Justice Department estimates that 17,500 people are trafficked into the country every year, but the true figure could be higher, because of the large numbers of undocumented immigrants. The United States Department of State has also estimated that between 14,000-17,5000 people annually are trafficked for sex, labor, or other types of exploitation into the United States. Those being trafficked include young children, teenagers, men and women and can be domestic citizens or foreign nationals.

Existing federal law protects websites that "post third-party ads for massages, body rubs, escort services and other thinly veiled references to prostitution" from any "liability under the Communications Decency Act."

State laws in Connecticut, New Jersey, and Washington that attempted to stop online sex ads were overturned as unconstitutional.

== Provisions of the bill ==
This summary is based largely on the summary provided by the Congressional Research Service, a public domain source.

The Stop Advertising Victims of Exploitation Act of 2014 or the SAVE Act of 2014 would prohibit knowingly benefitting financially from, receiving anything of value from, or distributing advertising that offers a commercial sex act in a manner that violates federal criminal code prohibitions against sex trafficking of children or of any person by force, fraud, or coercion. Subjects violators to a fine, imprisonment of up to five years, or both.

The bill would grant U.S. courts extraterritorial jurisdiction over such an offense if an alleged offender is a U.S. national or an alien lawfully admitted for permanent residence or if an alleged offender is present in the United States, irrespective of the offender's nationality.

== Congressional Budget Office report ==
This summary is based largely on the summary provided by the Congressional Budget Office, as ordered reported by the House Committee on the Judiciary on April 30, 2014. This is a public domain source.

The Congressional Budget Office (CBO) estimates that implementing H.R. 4225 would have no significant cost to the federal government. Enacting the bill could affect direct spending and revenues; therefore, pay-as-you-go procedures apply. However, the CBO estimates that any effects would be insignificant.

H.R. 4225 would clarify the current laws against sex trafficking with regard to the advertising of such acts. As a result, the government might be able to increase the number of successful prosecutions in these cases. The CBO expects that the bill would apply to a relatively small number of offenders, however, so any increase in costs for law enforcement, court proceedings, or prison operations would not be significant. Any such costs would be subject to the availability of appropriated funds.

Because those prosecuted and convicted under H.R. 4225 could be subject to criminal fines, the federal government might collect additional fines if the legislation is enacted. Criminal fines are recorded as revenues, deposited in the Crime Victims Fund, and later spent. The CBO expects that any additional revenues and direct spending would not be significant because of the small number of cases likely to be affected.

== Procedural history ==
The Stop Advertising Victims of Exploitation Act of 2014 was introduced into the United States House of Representatives on March 13, 2014 by Rep. Ann Wagner (R, MO-2). The bill was referred to the United States House Committee on the Judiciary and the United States House Judiciary Subcommittee on Crime, Terrorism, Homeland Security and Investigations. On May 15, 2014, it was reported (amended) by the Committee alongside House Report 113-451. It was scheduled to be voted on in the House on May 20, 2014 under a suspension of the rules.

== Debate and discussion ==
Rep. Wagner said that Congress was "taking steps towards ending what I would call modern-day slavery." Wagner argued that her bill had been reviewed by the Justice Department in an attempt to ensure that it did not violate the First Amendment to the United States Constitution's guarantee of the right to free speech. Wagner argued that the House had not passed any legislation on human trafficking in 13 years, and that "our efforts to combat sex trafficking need to be updated to match the problem as it stands today."

Critics contended that the law was vaguely worded. The law supposedly took aim at adult ads on Backpage, but civil liberties groups argued that the law was too broad and would have a chilling effect on speech.

The Seattle Times editorial board wrote an editorial in favor of the bill, calling on Congress to "strengthen U.S. laws to stop human trafficking."

The American Civil Liberties Union has opposed the bill, arguing that it would "unintentionally shut down lawful speech" and apply not only to advertising sites like Backpage.com, but also to any site with user-generated profiles or content, including Facebook, Tinder, OK Cupid and Tumblr. The Center for Democracy and Technology has warned that the bill's overly broad language and strict sentencing guidelines would have a chilling effect on legal adult speech.

The SAVE Act has also been opposed by sex workers' rights organizations, including the Red Umbrella Project, the Desiree Alliance and the Woodhull Sexual Freedom Alliance, which argued that shutting down sites like Backpage.com paradoxically increases trafficking risks for sex workers, by removing one of the only ways an independent escort can reach clients. "Such actions are also likely to force them underground, which reduces their ability to report abuses, violence, or trafficking to the authorities."

== Post-promulgation ==
=== Backpage.com v. Lynch ===
Backpage, a classified advertising website, sued then-U.S. Attorney General Loretta Lynch to preclude the law's enforcement, arguing that despite its best efforts to keep illegal ads off its site, the wording of the law raised the bar for prosecution from a "knowing" standard to one of "reckless disregard," and therefore violated the First Amendment.

In October 2016, the U.S. District Court for the District of Columbia found that the law did not criminalize protected speech, and that because Backpage took steps to avoid having illegal content on its site, it arguably was not in imminent danger of prosecution. But Backpage's suit won a significant clarification from the court, which interpreted the law as requiring a "knowing" mens rea standard for a conviction, which is a higher standard than "reckless disregard". Wrote the court: "while it might be true that some Congressional members had Backpage.com in mind when enacting the SAVE ACT, the statute is 'aimed' at individuals who knowingly advertise or benefit from advertising sex trafficking."

== See also ==
- List of bills in the 113th United States Congress
- Human trafficking in the United States
- Commercial sexual exploitation of children
