= Peter Terpeluk Jr. =

American politician (1948–2011)

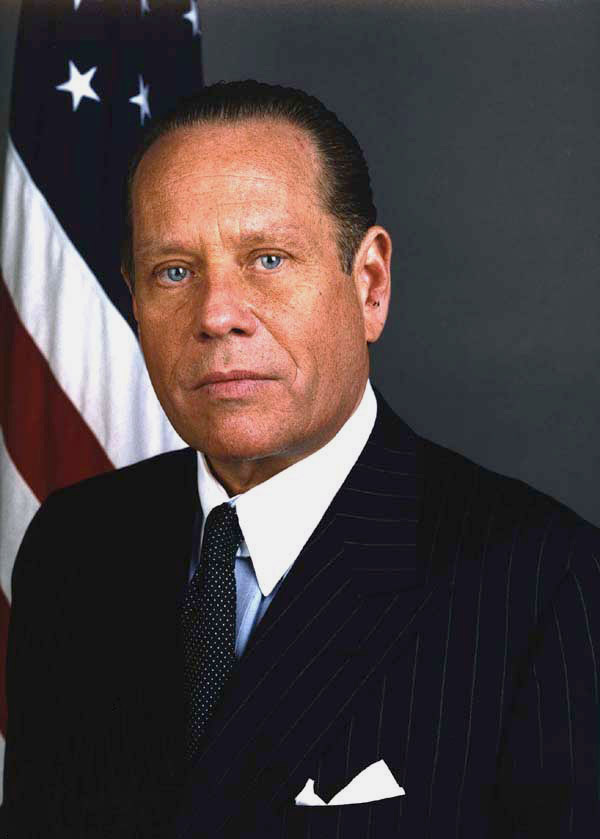
Peter Terpeluk, 2002

J. Peter Terpeluk Jr. (February 18, 1948 – August 23, 2011) was an American diplomat and Republican politician from Pennsylvania who was the United States Ambassador to Luxembourg for part of the tenure of President George W. Bush.

== Formative years ==
Born in Lafayette Hill, Pennsylvania on February 18, 1948, Terpeluk graduated from Malvern Preparatory School and received a Bachelor of Arts degree from La Salle College and master's degree in public administration from Rider College, as well as honorary doctorates from Sacred Heart University and La Salle College.

== Public service career ==
From 1972 to 1981, Terpeluk served as town manager in two townships in southeastern Pennsylvania and later served in the Small Business Administration until 1984.

He founded the consulting firm Terpeluk and Associates in 1986, which he continued to operate while a principal in the Washington office of the firm S.R. Wojdak & Associates, from 1989 to 1993.

He also served as finance chairman for the Republican Party.

President George W. Bush nominated Terpeluk for the post of United States Ambassador to Luxembourg in December 2001; the U.S. Senate confirmed him on March 21, 2002. Terpeluk then swore his oath to the president on April 17, 2002, and presented his credentials to Henri, Grand Duke of Luxembourg on April 30, 2002. From 2002 to 2005, he served as United States ambassador to Luxembourg.

From 2009 until his death, Terpeluk served as national finance chairman for the Republican National Committee. Terpeluk died on August 23, 2011, of a heart attack when he was leaving his Chevy Chase, Maryland home to meet Texas Governor Rick Perry.

Diplomatic posts
| Preceded by Gerald Loftus | United States Ambassador to Luxembourg; 2002–2005 | Succeeded by Ann Wagner |
