= Retail Investor Protection Act =

- Long title: To amend the Securities Exchange Act of 1934 to provide protections for retail customers, and for other purposes.
- Announced in: the 113th United States Congress
- Sponsored by: Rep. Ann Wagner (R, MO-2)
- Number of co-sponsors: 0

Codification
- Acts affected: Securities Exchange Act of 1934, Dodd-Frank Wall Street Reform and Consumer Protection Act, Employee Retirement Income Security Act of 1974, Investment Advisers Act of 1940
- U.S.C. sections affected: 15 U.S.C. § 80b–11, 15 U.S.C. § 78o, 12 U.S.C. § 5301 et seq., 29 U.S.C. § 1001 et seq.
- Agencies affected: United States Department of Labor, U.S. Securities and Exchange Commission

Legislative history
- Introduced in the House as H.R. 2374 by Rep. Ann Wagner (R, MO-2) on June 14, 2013; Committee consideration by United States House Committee on Financial Services, United States House Committee on Education and the Workforce, United States Senate Committee on Banking, Housing, and Urban Affairs; Passed the House on October 29, 2013 (Roll Call Vote 567: 254–166)

The Retail Investor Protection Act (H.R. 2374) is a bill that would delay some pending regulations being written by the United States Department of Labor until the Securities and Exchange Commission has finalized their own rules. The rules in question are rules that would describe "when financial advisors are considered a fiduciary, which means they must work in their clients' best interest." The bill passed the United States House of Representatives during the 113th United States Congress.

== Provisions of the bill ==
This summary is based largely on the summary provided by the Congressional Research Service, a public domain source.

The Retail Investor Protection Act would prohibit the United States Secretary of Labor from prescribing any regulation under the Employee Retirement Income Security Act of 1974 (ERISA) defining the circumstances under which an individual is considered a fiduciary until 60 days after the Securities and Exchange Commission (SEC) issues a final rule governing standards of conduct for brokers and dealers under specified law.

Section 3 of the bill would amend the Securities Exchange Act of 1934 to prohibit the SEC from promulgating a rule establishing an investment advisor standard of conduct as the standard of conduct of brokers and dealers before it has ascertained: (1) if retail customers are systematically harmed or disadvantaged owing to the operation of brokers or dealers under different standards of conduct than those that apply to investment advisors under the Investment Advisers Act of 1940, and (2) whether adoption of a uniform fiduciary standard of care for brokers or dealers and investment advisors would adversely impact retail investor access or availability to personalized investment advice and recommendations.

The bill would require the SEC: (1) to publish in the Federal Register formal findings that such rules would reduce retail customer confusion regarding standards of conduct applicable to brokers, dealers, and investment advisors; and (2) in proposing such rules, to consider the differences in the registration, supervision, and examination requirements applicable to brokers, dealers, and investment advisors.

== Congressional Budget Office report ==
This summary is based largely on the summary provided by the Congressional Budget Office, as ordered reported by the House Committee on Financial Services on June 19, 2013. This is a public domain source.

H.R. 2374 would prohibit the Secretary of Labor from finalizing a regulation related to certain investment advisors until the Securities and Exchange Commission (SEC) issues a final rule setting standards of conduct for brokers and dealers of securities. The regulation that would be delayed by the bill will define the circumstances under which an individual is considered to be a fiduciary when providing investment advice to retirement and other employee benefit plans and their participants. Under current law, the SEC has been authorized to develop regulations that establish the same standards of conduct for brokers and dealers that are already in place for investment advisors when providing advice to persons who use the information for personal reasons.

Based on information from the SEC and the Employee Benefits Security Administration (EBSA), the Congressional Budget Office (CBO) estimated that implementing H.R. 2374 would not have a significant effect on federal spending. The EBSA plans to propose a new rule related to fiduciary standards for advisors of retirement and employee benefit plans but has not published a schedule for implementation. Therefore, adding a contingency—that the SEC act first—may delay the timing of a final rule from the EBSA, but at no additional cost to the agency. The SEC staff has recommended that the commission develop a rule to harmonize standards of conduct for brokers, dealers, and investment advisors; to that end, the commission has issued a request for additional data and other information on the topic. The CBO expected that implementing the provisions of H.R. 2374 would not significantly change the SEC's workload. Enacting H.R. 2374 would not affect direct spending or revenues; therefore, pay-as-you-go procedures do not apply.

H.R. 2374 contains no intergovernmental or private-sector mandates as defined in the Unfunded Mandates Reform Act and would not affect the budgets of state, local, or tribal governments.

== Procedural history ==
=== House ===
The Retail Investor Protection Act was introduced in the House on June 14, 2013, by Rep. Ann Wagner (R, MO-2). It was referred to the United States House Committee on Financial Services and the United States House Committee on Education and the Workforce. It was reported alongside House Report 113-228 part 1 and House Report 113-228 part 2. On October 29, 2013, the House voted in Roll Call Vote 567 to pass the bill, 254–166.

=== Senate ===
The Retail Investor Protection Act was received in the United States Senate on October 30, 2013. It was referred to the United States Senate Committee on Banking, Housing, and Urban Affairs.

=== President ===
On October 28, 2013, President of the United States Barack Obama released a statement that said his administration "strongly opposes" H.R. 2374 and threatened to veto the bill.

== Debate and discussion ==
The American Federation of Labor and Congress of Industrial Organizations (AFL–CIO) wrote an open letter to the House of Representatives asking them to oppose the bill. The Pension Rights Center also opposed the bill, warning legislators that the "bill would scuttle years of work and an on-going process to ensure that financial advisors provide investment advice that serves the best interest of the client and not the advisor's self-interest."

Supporters, such as House Majority Leader Eric Cantor, argued that the regulations this bill was designed to prevent would increase the costs of financial planning for families.

== See also ==
- List of bills in the 113th United States Congress
