= List of ambassadors of the United States to Luxembourg =

Ambassador of the United States to Luxembourg
- Seal of the United States Department of State

- Flag of a United States ambassador

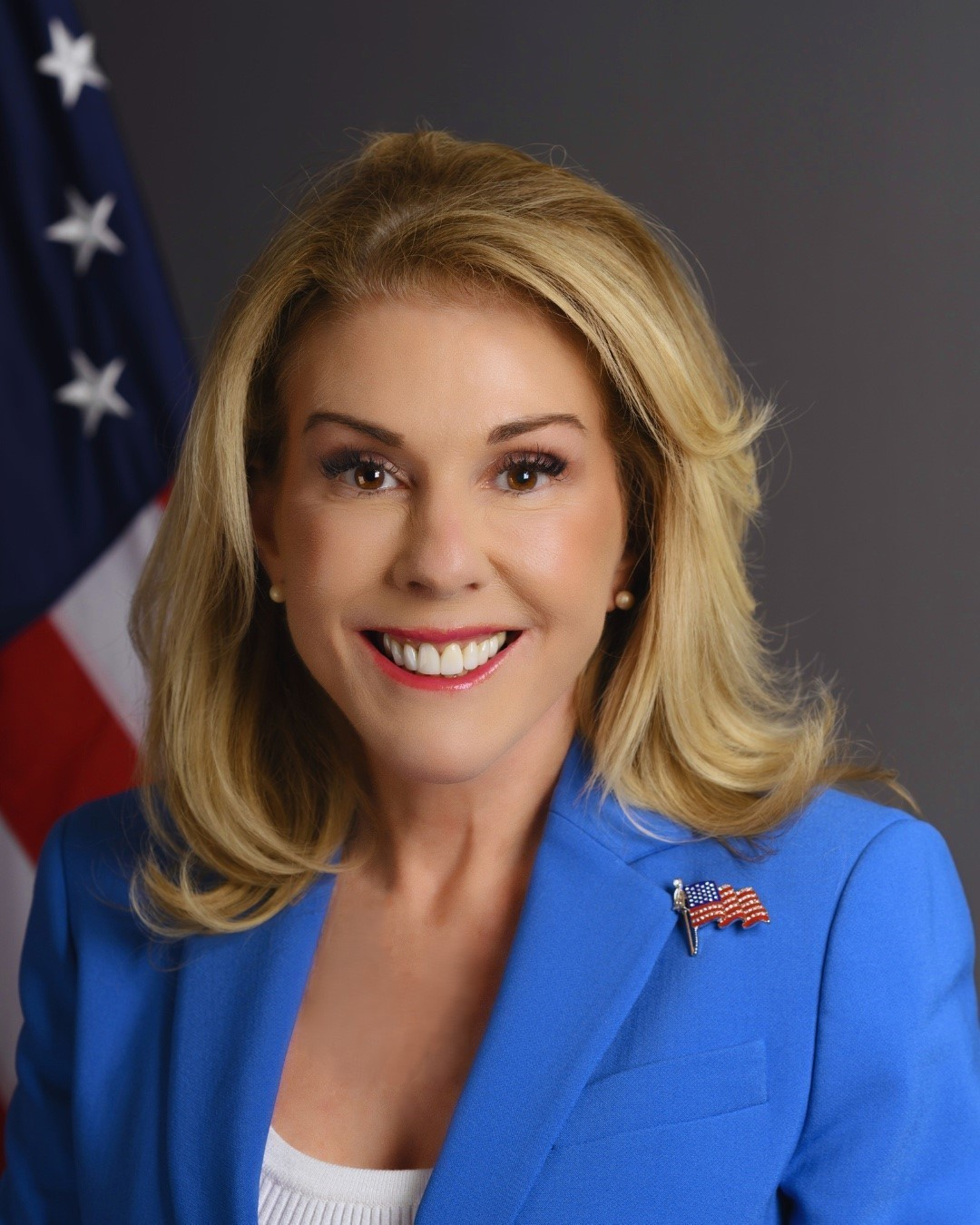
- Incumbent; Stacey Feinberg since November 13, 2025
- Residence: Dolibois House
- Nominator: The president of the United States
- Appointer: The president with Senate advice and consent
- Inaugural holder: Stanford Newel as Envoy
- Formation: 1903
- Website: U.S. Embassy – Luxembourg

The United States ambassador to Luxembourg oversees the U.S. Embassy in that country. They supervise the embassy staff in the conduct of diplomatic relations with the Grand Duchy of Luxembourg and coordination of the activities of U.S. Government personnel serving in Luxembourg as well as official visitors. Under the ambassador's direction, the embassy staff provides consular services, including visas for visitors to the United States and passports for United States citizens in Luxembourg.

The United States has maintained diplomatic relations with Luxembourg since 1903.

From 1903 to 1923 the ambassador to the Netherlands served concurrently as ambassador to Luxembourg.

From 1923 until World War II the ambassador to Belgium also served as ambassador to Luxembourg.

During World War II the United States maintained diplomatic relations with the Luxembourg government in exile.

After World War II, the United States returned to appointing the ambassador to Belgium concurrently as the ambassador to Luxembourg.

Since 1956 the United States ambassador to Luxembourg has been appointed separately from the ambassador to the Netherlands.

This is a complete list of United States envoys and ambassadors appointed to Luxembourg since 1903:

== United States ambassadors to The Netherlands and Luxembourg ==
- Stanford Newel 1903–1905
- David Jayne Hill 1905–1908
- Arthur M. Beaupre 1908–1911
- Lloyd Bryce 1911–1913
- Henry van Dyke 1913–1917
- John W. Garrett 1917–1919
- William Phillips 1920–1922
- Henry P. Fletcher 1923–1924
- William Phillips 1924–1927

== United States ambassadors to Luxembourg government in exile ==
- Jay Pierrepont Moffat 1941–1943
- Ray Atherton 1943
- Anthony J. Drexel Biddle Jr. 1943
- Rudolf E. Schoenfeld 1944

== United States ambassadors to Belgium and Luxembourg ==
- Charles W. Sawyer 1944–1945
- Alan G. Kirk 1946–1949

== United States ambassadors to Luxembourg ==
- Perle Mesta 1949–1953
- Wiley T. Buchanan Jr. 1953–1956
- Vinton Chapin 1957–1960
- A. Burks Summers 1960–1961
- James Wine 1961–1962
- William R. Rivkin 1962–1965
- Patricia Roberts Harris 1965–1967
- George J. Feldman 1967–1969
- Kingdon Gould Jr. 1969–1972
- Ruth Lewis Farkas 1973–1976
- Rosemary L. Ginn 1976–1977
- James G. Lowenstein 1977–1981
- John E. Dolibois 1981–1985
- Jean Broward Shevlin Gerard 1985–1990
- Frederick Morris Bush
- Edward Morgan Rowell 1990–1994
- Clay Constantinou 1994–1999
- James Hormel 1999–2001
- Gerald Loftus 2001–2002
- Peter Terpeluk Jr. 2002–2005
- Ann Wagner 2005–2009
- Cynthia Stroum 2009–2011
- Robert A. Mandell 2011–2015
- David McKean 2016–2017
- Randy Evans 2018–2021
- Tom Barrett 2022–2025
- Stacey Feinberg 2025–present

== See also ==
- Embassy of Luxembourg, Washington, D.C.
- Luxembourg – United States relations
- Foreign relations of Luxembourg
- Ambassadors of the United States
