= Bob Woolf =

American sports agent (1928–1993)

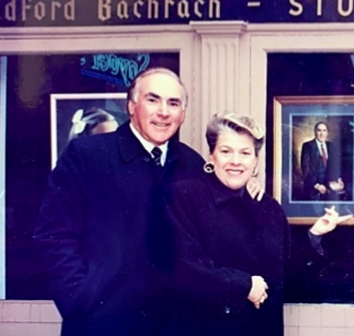
- Bob and Anne Woolf in Rockefeller Center in 1990
- Born: February 15, 1928; Portland, Maine, U.S.
- Died: November 30, 1993 (aged 65); Hallandale, Florida, U.S.
- Education: Boston Latin; Boston College; Boston University School of Law
- Occupations: Sports agent, lawyer
- Spouse: Anne Woolf
- Children: 3, including Stacey Feinberg

Bob Woolf (February 15, 1928 – November 30, 1993) was an American sports agent and lawyer. One of the first sports agents, he "ushered in the era of the millionaire sports celebrity" as the agent for athletes including Carl Yastrzemski, Larry Bird, John Havlicek, and Julius Erving. Noted for both his skill as a negotiator and his ethics, the New York Times wrote: "There is something sternly Calvinistic about Woolf's conviction that when you make a commitment you must honor it."

== Early life and education ==
Woolf was born in Portland, Maine. His father, Joseph R. Woolf (Wolfiwicz), was a physician who had immigrated from Belarus. His mother, Anna Rose née Glovsky, was born in Salem MA, the daughter of immigrants from Ottoman Palestine. His family moved to Boston when he was a teenager, and at 16, he started The Woolf Supply Company of New England, buying and selling factory-direct household items to retailers. A standout basketball player, he graduated from Boston Latin, and attended Boston College on a four-year basketball scholarship. He earned his JD from Boston University School of Law. Woolf passed the bar prior to his graduation.

== Career ==
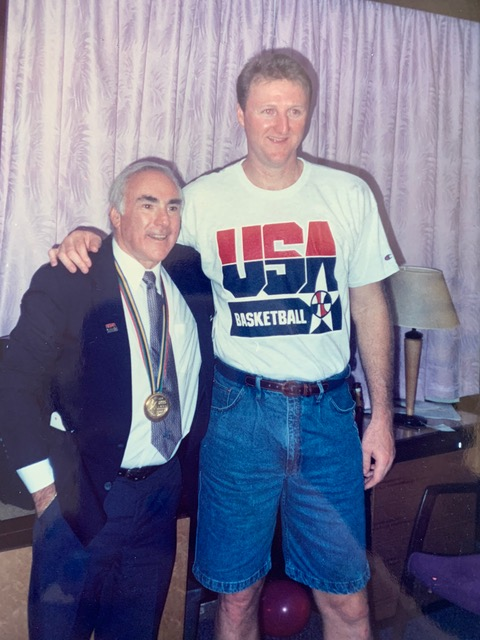
Woolf and Larry Bird in 1992

Woolf spent two years in the Army after earning his degree and opened a law firm in Boston following his discharge. A trial attorney, he won 52 of 56 jury trials. In 1965, Red Sox pitcher Earl Wilson pitched a no-hitter and asked Woolf to handle his endorsements and related off-the-field opportunities. In 1966, Woolf renegotiated his contract, and Wilson—impressed with Woolf's advice and negotiating skill—introduced him to other Red Sox players. Soon after, Woolf was hired by Yastrzemski, Reggie Smith, Ken Harrelson, and others. His client roster quickly expanded to include other athletes, and in addition to representing 14 players on the 1967 Boston Red Sox team, he represented nine of the 12 Boston Celtics during their championship years in the late 60s.

Woolf closed his law office in 1971 to focus full-time on representing athletes. Within five years, he had signed 300 players. Based in Boston, his office overlooked Fenway Park. It was packed with gifts from his clients, ultimately including Bird's uniform from his first Boston Celtics championship, Jim Craig's stick from the 1980 Olympic hockey win over the Soviet Union (the Miracle on Ice), and Yastrzemski's bat from his last hit.

As his roster grew, Woolf became concerned about the spending habits of the younger athletes he represented. To ensure that they would be financially stable following their peak earning years, he oversaw his client's investments as a personal manager.

At the time of his death in 1993, his company, Woolf Associates, employed 30 people and had offices in Miami, Spain, Dallas, Los Angeles and New York. Woolf had represented 2000 clients, including athletes as well as celebrities such as New Kids on the Block and Larry King. He negotiated an estimated 20,000 contracts worth more than $1bn. In 1996, Woolf Associates was purchased by former Boston Bruin Bobby Orr.

== Personal life ==
Woolf's main residence was in Brookline, Massachusetts. He had three other houses in Massachusetts, as well as homes in Portland, Maine, Marina del Rey, New York; and Jerusalem. He and his wife, Anne, met at a party, and got engaged on their second date. They had three children, Tiffany, Gary, and Stacey, who began the literary division at her father's company.

Woolf died of a heart attack in Hallandale, Florida when he was 65. He played tennis 12 hours before his death.

== Bibliography ==
- Friendly Persuasion: My Life As a Negotiator, October 1990; Putnam Adult; ISBN 978-0-399-13552-1
- Behind Closed Doors, August 1976, Athenium, ASIN: B01K3IPM24
