= Randy Evans =

American lawyer & diplomat (born 1958)

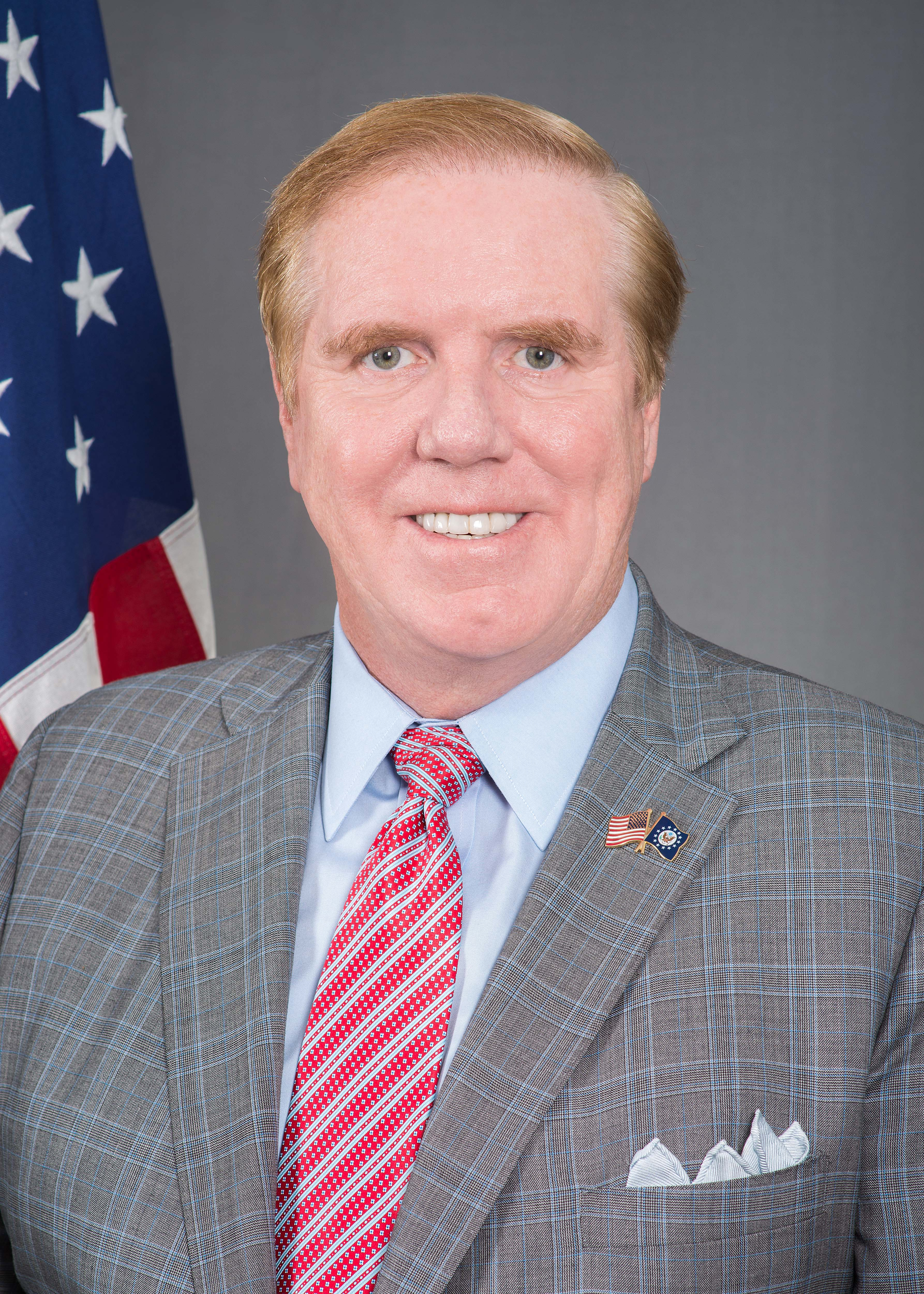

United States Ambassador to Luxembourg
- In office June 19, 2018 – January 20, 2021
- President: Donald Trump
- Preceded by: David McKean
- Succeeded by: Tom Barrett

Personal details
- Born: James Randolph Evans; September 24, 1958 (age 68) Dublin, Georgia, U.S.
- Party: Republican
- Spouse: Linda Evans
- Children: 1
- Education: West Georgia College (BA); University of Georgia School of Law (JD)

James Randolph Evans (born September 24, 1958) is an American lawyer and diplomat who served as the United States Ambassador to Luxembourg from 2018 to 2021. He presented his credentials on June 19, 2018, to the Grand Duke of Luxembourg. A member of the Republican Party from Georgia, he specializes in litigation, as well as professional, legal and government ethics. Evans is a partner at the global law firm Squire Patton Boggs.

On September 21, 2017, he was selected by President Donald Trump to become the next United States Ambassador to Luxembourg. The nomination, which was submitted to the Senate on September 28, 2017, was confirmed on May 24, 2018.

On January 20, 2021, Evans resigned as United States Ambassador to Luxembourg with the end of President Trump's term in office. Pending appointment of his successor by incoming President Biden, his responsibilities were assumed in an acting capacity by Casey Mace, Chargé d'Affaires.

Evans is currently chairman of the United States Triumphal Arch Foundation, a private foundation tasked with constructing the United States Triumphal Arch.

== Early life and education ==
Randy Evans was born in Dublin, Georgia, on September 24, 1958. He grew up in Warner Robins, Georgia, where he graduated from Northside High School in 1976. He was awarded a debate scholarship to West Georgia College in Carrollton, Georgia. Evans was elected in 1979 as President of the West Georgia College Student Government Association. Evans majored in Political Science and minored in Mathematics and Speech, and graduated with a Bachelor of Arts degree, summa cum laude, in 1980. While a student at West Georgia, Evans volunteered for Newt Gingrich's 1976 losing and 1978 winning campaigns. In 1979, Evans lived in the basement of Gingrich's Virginia home while he interned for the freshman congressman. Evans graduated with a Juris Doctor degree from the University of Georgia School of Law in 1983, magna cum laude.

== Legal career ==
Evans began his legal career at Bondurant, Miller, Hishon & Stephenson, a law firm in Atlanta, Georgia. In 1985, Evans joined Arnall, Golden and Gregory, where he worked for 18 years. In 2003, Evans started working at McKenna Long & Aldridge. On July 1, 2015, McKenna, Long & Aldridge merged with Dentons, where Evans was a partner until resigning in April 2018 as the U.S. Senate considered his nomination for Ambassador to Luxembourg. In March 2021, Evans joined Squire Patton Boggs as a senior partner.

== National political career ==
Evans chaired Newt Gingrich's campaign organization, the Friends of Newt Gingrich (FONG), in Gingrich's successful reelection contests in 1988 and 1990. In 1995, Gingrich retained Evans as his general counsel to the Speaker of the United States House of Representatives.

After Gingrich stepped down as Speaker at the end of 1998, Evans negotiated a variety of business ventures for Gingrich, including a television contract with FOX News and book contracts for several books, including various New York Times bestsellers.

Evans chaired Gingrich's companies from their inception in 1999 until Gingrich's 2011 announcement that he would run for president.

Upon his election as Speaker of the House of Representatives in 1999, Dennis Hastert retained Evans as his general counsel to the Speaker. Evans represented Hastert throughout his tenure as the longest serving Republican Speaker of the House in history including the Bush vs. Gore election in 2000 and the attacks on September 11, 2001.

Beginning in 2002, Evans represented Georgia Governor Sonny Perdue, who was the first Republican governor in Georgia since Reconstruction. Later, Perdue nominated Harold Melton to the Georgia Supreme Court. Melton was appointed as the first Republican African-American justice to Georgia's Supreme Court. Evans went on to represent Perdue's successor, Governor Nathan Deal.

Evans has represented former House Republican Conference Chairman J. C. Watts since his last term in Congress. He later served as the chair of the board of some of Watt's companies.

In conjunction with Susan Hirschman (former Chief of Staff for Majority Leader Tom DeLay) and Bill Paxon (former National Republican Campaign Committee Chairman), Evans designed and formed the first political organization after the effective date of the Bipartisan Campaign Reform Act in order to receive non-federal money. After challenges by Common Cause, the Federal Election Commission found that the entity – as structured – could accept non-federal money.

In 2005–2006, Evans participated in the United States Supreme Court litigation known as the Bipartisan Campaign Finance Reform Act as counsel to the Speaker of the United States House of Representatives.

Evans served as a senior advisor to Newt Gingrich's 2012 campaign for the Republican nomination for president until Gingrich's suspended his campaign in late April 2012.

== Georgia political career ==
Evans was elected chairman of the Douglas County Republican Party in 1985, as well as chairman of the Sixth Congressional District in 1987 and 1989.

Evans served as general counsel to the Georgia Republican Party for eight years, beginning with his appointment by then Republican Chairman Ralph Reed in 2001. He was reappointed by Georgia Republican Party Chairman Alec Poitevint in 2003 and 2005, and by Georgia Republican Party Chairman Sue Everhart in 2007 and 2009. From 2009 to 2011, Evans served as finance chair to the Georgia Republican Party.

In 2004, 2005, 2008, 2012 and 2016, Evans was selected as a delegate to the Republican National Convention. Evans was appointed and served as the Republican National Committeeman from Georgia for the 2004 Republican National Convention (when Alec Poitevint was Georgia State Chairman). Evans served as an elector for the State of Georgia in the 2008, 2012, and 2016 presidential elections.

Evans served on the state committee and state executive committee of the Georgia Republican Party for years. From 2003 to 2016, Evans served as the chairman of the Georgia Republican Convention.

He served as the co-chair of the Georgia Judicial Nominating Commission and as the Republican National Committeeman from Georgia. He previously served as a member of the five-person Georgia State Election Board for ten years.

== Personal life ==
Evans, who is married to Linda Evans, a former Wall Street lawyer, has one son; his hobbies include playing chess and following the Georgia Bulldogs.

Diplomatic posts
Preceded by David McKean	United States Ambassador to Luxembourg; 2018–2021	Succeeded by Tom Barrett
