= David McKean (diplomat) =

American diplomat

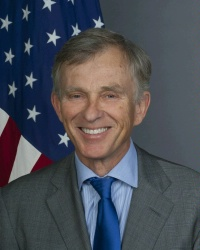

22nd United States Ambassador to Luxembourg
- In office April 14, 2016 – January 20, 2017
- President: Barack Obama
- Preceded by: Robert A. Mandell
- Succeeded by: Randy Evans

27th Director of Policy Planning
- In office February 19, 2013 – March 4, 2016
- President: Barack Obama
- Preceded by: Jake Sullivan
- Succeeded by: Jonathan Finer

Personal details
- Born: 1956 (age 69–70)
- Party: Democratic
- Relatives: Katherine Winthrop McKean (Mother)
- Education: Harvard University (AB); Tufts University (MA); Duke University (JD)

David McKean (born 1956) is an American attorney, author, political advisor, and diplomat who served as the United States Ambassador to Luxembourg from 2016 to 2017. He was confirmed to the position in 2016 and sworn in on March 14, 2016. He previously held the position of Director of Policy Planning at the United States Department of State from 2013 to 2016 under John Kerry.

== Education ==
During high school, McKean spent his junior year in Rennes, France, studying with School Year Abroad (SYA). McKean is a graduate of Harvard College, the Fletcher School of Law and Diplomacy, and Duke University School of Law.

== Career ==
Before joining the Department of State, McKean was a public policy fellow at the Woodrow Wilson International Center for Scholars in 2011 and 2012. He previously worked as CEO of the John F. Kennedy Presidential Library and Museum in Boston, staff director for the United States Senate Committee on Foreign Relations (2009–2010), and chief of staff to Senator John Kerry (1999–2008). McKean also served as minority staff director of the United States Senate Homeland Security Permanent Subcommittee on Investigations (1997–1998), deputy chief counsel of the U.S. Senate Campaign Finance Investigation (1997), and Special Counsel to the Commodity Futures Trading Commission (1995–1997). Prior to that, he served as Chief of Staff to Congressman Joseph P. Kennedy II (1994–1995) and Legislative Assistant to U.S. Senator John Kerry (1987–1992). McKean taught at the Waterford Kamhlaba in Eswatini (1981–1982). Since 2006, he has served as a board member for the National Archives Foundation.

== Publications ==
McKean has authored or co-authored five books on political history:

- Watching Darkness Fall: FDR, His Ambassadors, and the Rise of Adolf Hitler (2021)
- Suspected of Independence: The Life of Thomas McKean, America's First Power Broker (2016)
- with Cliff Sloan: The Great Decision: Jefferson, Adams, Marshall, and the Battle for the Supreme Court (2009)
- Tommy the Cork: Washington's Ultimate Insider from Roosevelt to Reagan (2003)
- with Douglas Frantz: Friends in High Places: The Rise and Fall of Clark Clifford (1995)

In 2012, he received the Distinguished Honor Award from the Department of State.
