= Ann Wagner =

American politician and diplomat (born 1962)

Member of the U.S. House of Representatives from Missouri's 2nd district
- Incumbent
- Assumed office January 3, 2013
- Preceded by: Todd Akin

United States Ambassador to Luxembourg
- In office August 16, 2005 – June 27, 2009
- President: George W. Bush; Barack Obama
- Preceded by: Peter Terpeluk
- Succeeded by: Cynthia Stroum

Chair of the Missouri Republican Party
- In office January 16, 1999 – July 16, 2005
- Preceded by: Woody Cozad
- Succeeded by: Doug Russell

Personal details
- Born: Ann Louise Trousdale; September 13, 1962 (age 64) St. Louis, Missouri, U.S.
- Party: Republican
- Spouse: Raymond Wagner (m. 1987)
- Children: 3
- Education: University of Missouri (BS)
- Website: House website Campaign website
- Wagner's voice Wagner on a bill prohibiting the advertisement of sex services involving trafficked women and children. Recorded January 27, 2015

Ann Louise Wagner (née Trousdale; born September 13, 1962) is an American politician and former diplomat serving as the U.S. representative for Missouri's 2nd congressional district since 2013. A member of the Republican Party, she was the United States ambassador to Luxembourg from 2005 to 2009.

Her district, located mostly in St. Louis County, is heavily suburban and the state's wealthiest. It includes most of St. Louis's southern and western suburbs as well as some of the northern exurbs in St. Charles County and the northern part of Jefferson County. Before her diplomatic post, Wagner chaired the Missouri Republican Party from 1999 until 2005; she co-chaired the Republican National Committee for four years, starting in 2001.

== Early life and education ==
Wagner was born and raised in St. Louis. Her parents owned two carpet stores where she worked growing up. She attended Cor Jesu Academy, a private Catholic all-girls school in South County, and graduated from the University of Missouri in 1984 with a BSBA from the business school with an emphasis in logistics. After college, she worked in the private sector and held management positions at Hallmark Cards in Kansas City and Ralston Purina in St. Louis.

== Career ==
=== 1990s ===
Wagner entered Republican politics in 1990, heading the GOP's efforts during the decennial redistricting of Missouri. In 1992, she was state director of President George H. W. Bush's unsuccessful reelection campaign.

=== 2000s ===
==== Missouri GOP ====
Wagner was elected to her first term of office as chair of the Missouri Republican Party in 1999, becoming the first woman to occupy the position. Her most notable achievement in that role came during her second two-year term, when she oversaw the party's taking majority control of both chambers of the Missouri General Assembly, winning the Senate in a 2001 special election and the House in the 2002 general election, the first time this had been seen in over 40 years. During her third term, the party held its majorities in both chambers and also took the governor's seat for the first time in 12 years with Matt Blunt's election in 2004, giving the GOP complete control of state government for the first time since 1921. Her six years as chairperson witnessed George W. Bush carry Missouri in both of his presidential bids and also saw the Republican Party win a majority of the state's congressional delegation.

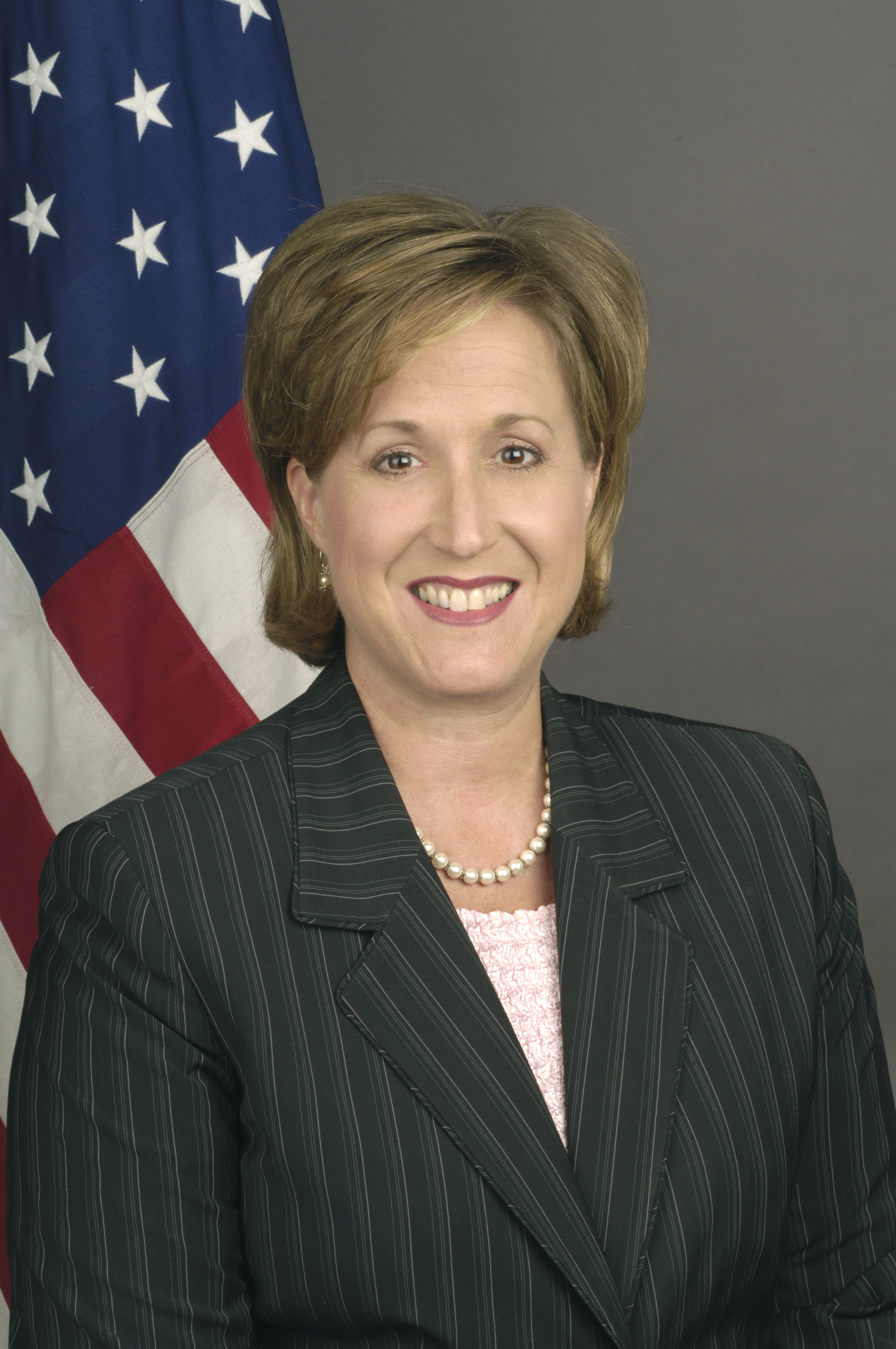
Wagner during her tenure as U.S. Ambassador to Luxembourg, 2005

==== National campaigning ====
In 2001, Wagner took office as a co-chair of the Republican National Committee and helped preside over the 2004 Republican National Convention. In this position, she took a strong role in directing the development of the Winning Women initiative, whose aim was to improve the GOP's image with women and demonstrate the relevance of its platform to them. Her work with the committee took her to 48 states. In January 2005, she left her role as co-chair after one term.

In 2004, Wagner was a fundraising "ranger" for President George W. Bush.

==== U.S. ambassadorship ====
On February 20, 2005, Wagner was elected to a fourth term as chair of the Missouri Republican Party. On May 16, Bush nominated her as United States ambassador to Luxembourg. On July 16, 2005, she was confirmed in the post by a voice vote in the United States Senate, after which Senator Jim Talent said she was "a considerate woman, whose character and abilities uniquely qualify her to represent our nation."

On August 1, she was sworn in as Ambassador by U.S. secretary of state Condoleezza Rice in the Benjamin Franklin Room of the Harry S Truman Building.

=== 2010s ===
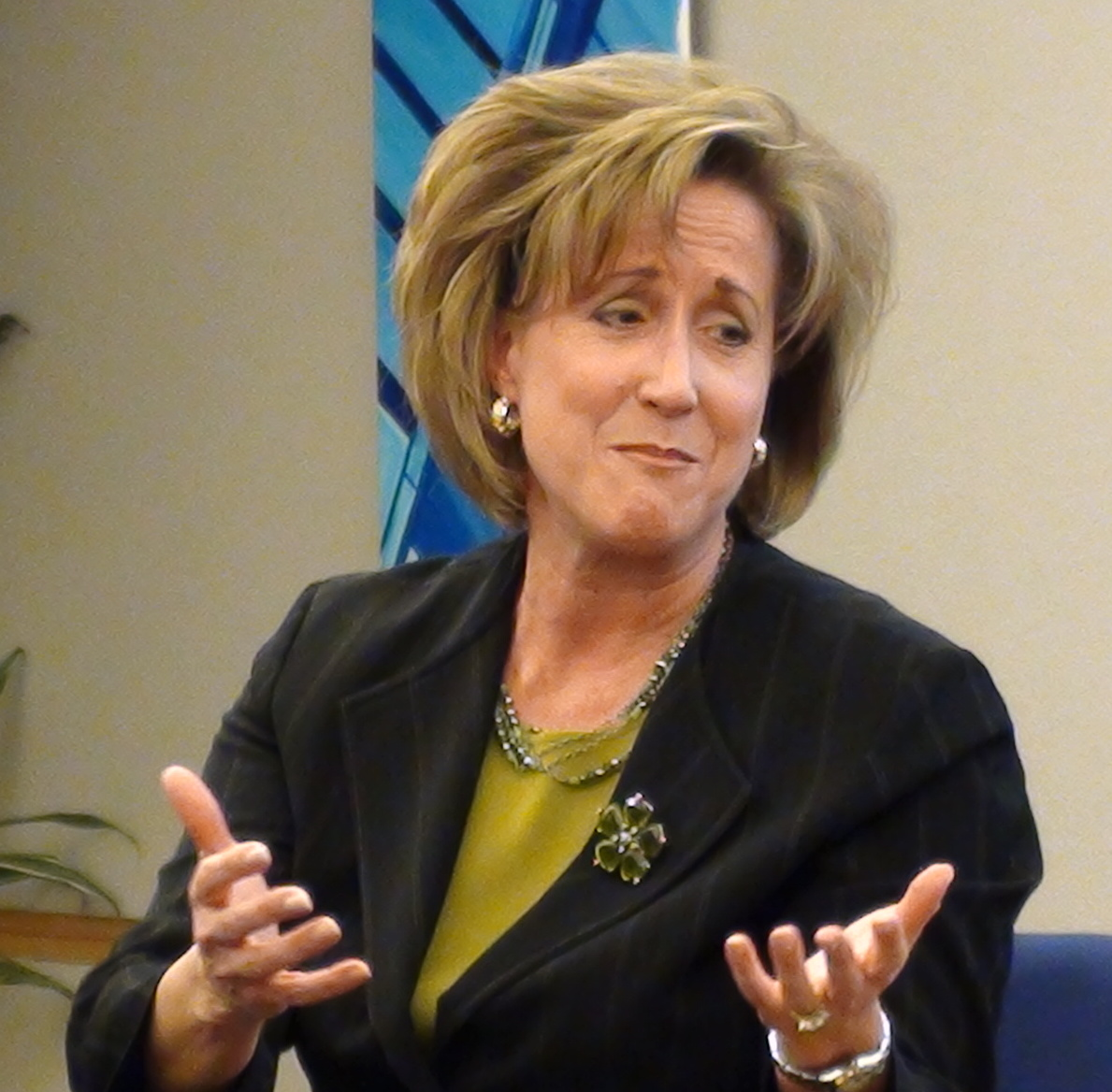
Wagner in 2010

==== 2010 U.S. Senate election ====
After returning from Luxembourg, Wagner served as chair of Roy Blunt's 2010 U.S. Senate campaign. Blunt defeated Missouri Secretary of State Robin Carnahan, 54%–41%.

==== 2011 RNC chair election ====
On November 29, 2010, Wagner sent a video message to the committee members of the Republican National Committee announcing she was running for RNC chair. The election was held in January 2011, and Wagner conceded after the sixth round after receiving 17 votes. Wisconsin Republican Party chair Reince Priebus won.

=== 2020s ===
==== Epstein files ====
In September 2025, Wagner was targeted by a public pressure campaign to sign a discharge petition to release the Epstein files. When speaking to press, Wagner described Jeffrey Epstein as "evil" and pointed to previous support for transparency, but would not commit to signing the petition or voting for the measure.

== U.S. House of Representatives ==
=== Elections ===
==== 2012 ====
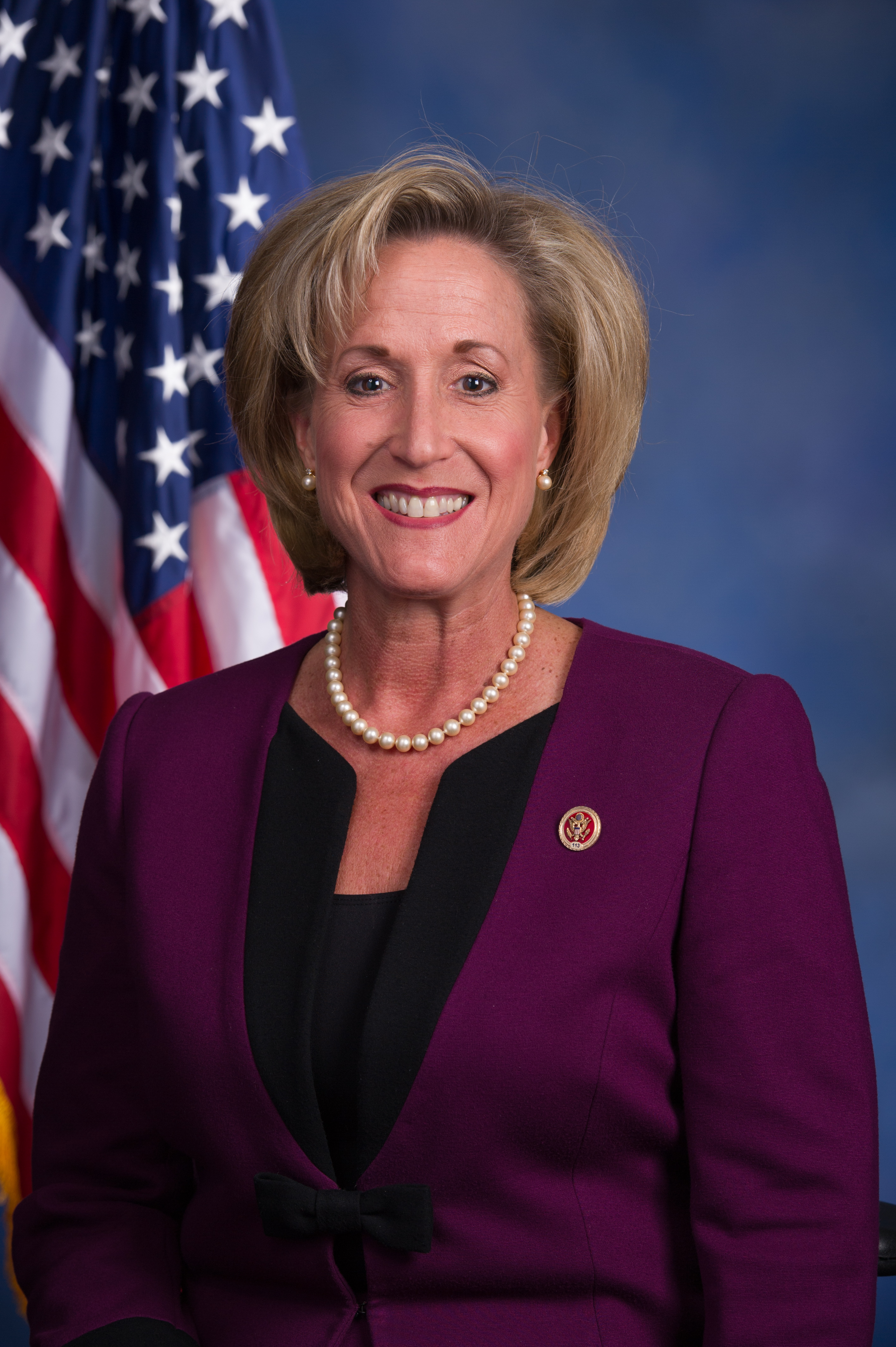
Wagner during the 113th Congress

Wagner announced her candidacy for Missouri's 2nd congressional district after incumbent Representative Todd Akin announced his candidacy for U.S. Senate. Wagner was endorsed by New Jersey governor Chris Christie, former Arkansas governor Mike Huckabee, former U.S. attorney general John Ashcroft, and the anti-abortion women's group the Susan B. Anthony List. She won the four-way Republican primary—the de facto election given the lack of support for Democratic nominee Glenn Koenen—with 66% of the vote. In November, she won the general election by 23 points.

Wagner is the third Republican woman elected to the House of Representatives from Missouri (after Jo Ann Emerson and Vicky Hartzler), and the second who was not elected as a stand-in for her husband (after Hartzler; Emerson was originally elected to finish out the term of her late husband, Bill Emerson).

2012 Election for U.S. Representative of Missouri's 2nd Congressional District
Party	Candidate	Votes	%
Republican	Ann Wagner	236,971	60.08
Democratic	Glenn Koenen	146,272	37.08
Libertarian	Bill Slantz	9,193	2.33
Constitution	Anatol Zorikova	2,012	0.51
Total votes		394,448	100.00

==== 2014 ====
In her first bid for reelection, Wagner ran unopposed in the Republican primary and easily won the general election, increasing her margin of victory from 2012.

2014 Election for U.S. Representative of Missouri's 2nd Congressional District
Party	Candidate	Votes	%
Republican	Ann Wagner	148,191	64.12
Democratic	Arthur Lieber	75,384	32.62
Libertarian	Bill Slantz	7,542	3.26
Total votes		231,117	100.00

==== 2016 ====
2016 Election for U.S. Representative of Missouri's 2nd Congressional District
Party	Candidate	Votes	%
Republican	Ann Wagner	241,954	58.54
Democratic	Bill Otto	155,689	37.67
Libertarian	Jim Higgins	11,758	2.84
Green	David Justus Arnold	3,895	0.94
Total votes		413,296	100.00

==== 2018 ====
Wagner had a closer-than-expected race against Democratic attorney Cort VanOstran, but prevailed with 51.2% of the vote to VanOstran's 47.2%. It was only the third time since 1986 that a Democrat had managed even 40% of the vote in this district.

2018 Election for U.S. Representative of Missouri's 2nd Congressional District
Party	Candidate	Votes	%
Republican	Ann Wagner	192,477	51.2
Democratic	Cort VanOstran	177,611	47.2
Libertarian	Tony Kirk	4,229	1.1
Green	David Arnold	1,740	0.5
Independent	Ken Newhouse (write-in)	9	0.0
Total votes		376,066	100.00

==== 2020 ====
Wagner was considered potentially vulnerable due to the surprisingly close margin in 2018 and President Donald Trump's unpopularity in suburban areas. State senator Jill Schupp, whose state senate district covers much of the St. Louis County portion of the congressional district, won the Democratic nomination unopposed.

By the fall of 2020, The Cook Political Report listed the race as a toss-up. Wagner defeated Schupp by just over six percentage points. At the same time, Trump carried the 2nd by only 115 votes, a marked turnabout from his 11-point win in 2016. It was the closest that a Democratic presidential nominee had come to carrying the district since it lost its share of St. Louis after the 1980 census.

2020 Election for U.S. Representative of Missouri's 2nd Congressional District
Party	Candidate	Votes	%
Republican	Ann Wagner	233,157	51.9
Democratic	Jill Schupp	204,540	45.5
Libertarian	Martin Schulte	11,647	2.6
Write-in		4	0.0
Total votes		449,348	100.00

==== 2022 ====
Wagner was reelected a 5th time in 2022, defeating Trish Gunby.

2022 Election for U.S. Representative of Missouri's 2nd Congressional District
Party	Candidate	Votes	%
Republican	Ann Wagner	173,277	54.9
Democratic	Trish Gunby	135,895	43.0
Libertarian	Bill Slantz	6,494	2.1
Total votes		315,666	100.00

==== 2024 ====
Wagner was reelected a 6th time in 2024, defeating Ray Hartmann.

2024 Election for U.S. Representative of Missouri's 2nd Congressional District
Party	Candidate	Votes	%
Republican	Ann Wagner	233,444	54.5
Democratic	Ray Hartmann	182,056	42.5
Libertarian	Brandon Daugherty	8,951	2.1
Green	Shelby Davis	3,941	0.9
Total votes		428,392	100.00

=== Tenure ===
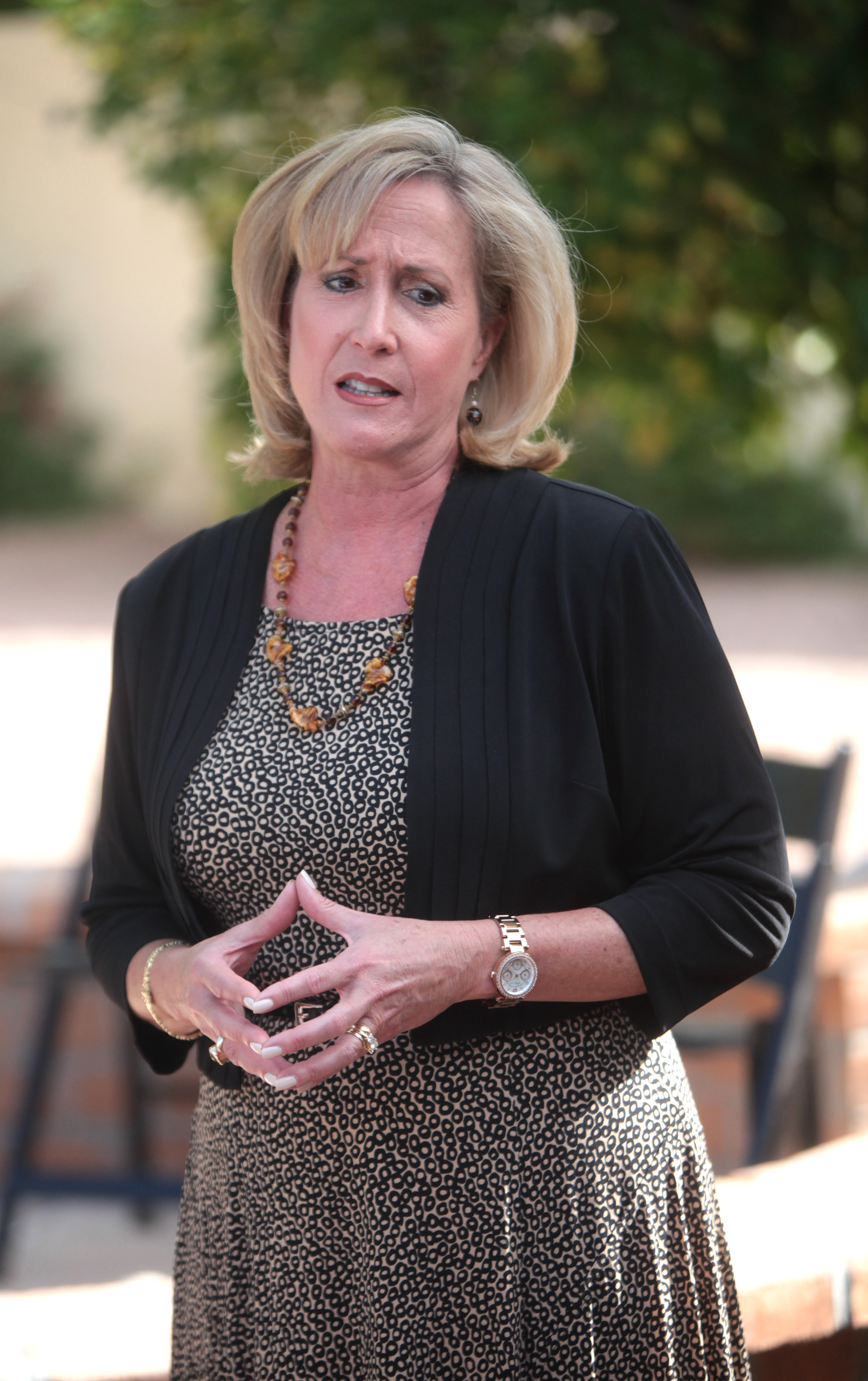
Wagner in 2014

In 2016, Wagner made headlines by withdrawing her endorsement for the GOP nominee for president, Donald Trump. Wagner's position on Trump changed several times since her initial endorsement in September; in October she withdrew her support and called on Trump to step down, but in November walked that statement back and voiced her intention to vote for Trump.

On May 4, 2017, Wagner voted for the American Health Care Act, which would have repealed Obamacare.

Wagner was one of 126 House Republicans who signed an amicus brief in support of Texas v. Pennsylvania, a lawsuit filed at the United States Supreme Court contesting the results of the 2020 presidential election.

Wagner voted to certify both Arizona's and Pennsylvania's results in the 2021 United States Electoral College vote count.

On July 19, 2022, Wagner and 46 other Republican Representatives voted for the Respect for Marriage Act, which would codify the right to same-sex marriage in federal law.

==== Legislation sponsored ====
The following is an incomplete list of legislation Wagner has sponsored:

- Retail Investor Protection Act (H.R. 2374; 113th Congress) – a bill that would delay the Department of Labor's regulations on when a financial advisor must be considered a fiduciary.
- Stop Advertising Victims of Exploitation Act of 2014 (H.R. 4225; 113th Congress) – a bill that would prohibit knowingly benefiting financially from, receiving anything of value from, or distributing advertising that offers a commercial sex act in a manner that violates federal criminal code prohibitions against sex trafficking of children or of any person by force, fraud, or coercion. The bill would make it a felony to post prostitution ads online. Wagner said that Congress was "taking steps towards ending what I would call modern-day slavery." She argued that her bill had been reviewed by the Justice Department in an attempt to ensure that it did not violate the First Amendment to the United States Constitution's guarantee of the right to free speech, that the House had not passed any legislation on human trafficking in 13 years, and that "our efforts to combat sex trafficking need to be updated to match the problem as it stands today."
- Retail Investor Protection Act (HR 1090; 114th Congress)—a revised version of legislation Wagner sponsored that would delay the DOL's regulations regarding fiduciary advisors that passed the House on October 27, 2015, by a vote of 245–186.

=== Committee assignments ===
For the 119th Congress:

- Committee on Financial Services
  - Subcommittee on Capital Markets (Chairman)
  - Subcommittee on Oversight and Investigations
- Permanent Select Committee on Intelligence
  - Subcommittee on National Intelligence Enterprise
  - Subcommittee on Open Source Intelligence (Chairwoman)

=== Caucus memberships ===
- Republican Study Committee
- Congressional Constitution Caucus
- Congressional Coalition on Adoption
- Congressional Taiwan Caucus
- Rare Disease Caucus

== Personal life ==
Ann is married to Ray Wagner Jr., a former director of the Missouri Department of Revenue and the Illinois Department of Revenue. They live in Ballwin, a western suburb of St. Louis. They have three children.

Ann's mother-in-law was Loretto Wagner, a noted anti-abortion activist.

Wagner is a Roman Catholic.

== See also ==
- Women in the United States House of Representatives

Party political offices
Preceded by Woody Cozad	Chair of the Missouri Republican Party; 1999–2005	Succeeded by Doug Russell
Diplomatic posts
Preceded by Peter Terpeluk	United States Ambassador to Luxembourg; 2005–2009	Succeeded by Cynthia Stroum
U.S. House of Representatives
Preceded by Todd Akin	Member of the U.S. House of Representatives from Missouri's 6th congressional district 2013–present	Incumbent
U.S. order of precedence (ceremonial)
Preceded by Marc Veasey	United States representatives by seniority 116th	Succeeded by Randy Weber
