= Rosemary L. Ginn =

American diplomat

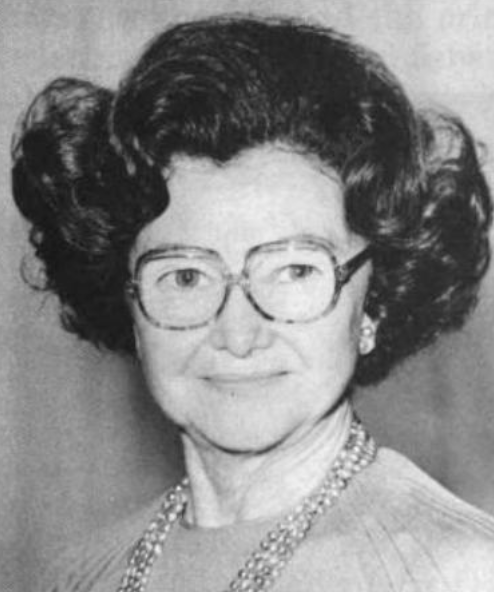
- Rosemary L. Ginn in the 1970s
- Born: Rosemary Bewick Lucas; August 28, 1912; Columbia, Missouri, U.S.
- Died: February 3, 2003 (age 90); Osage Beach, Missouri, U.S.
- Occupations: Political organizer, businesswoman
- Known for: U.S. Ambassador to Luxembourg (1976–1977)

Rosemary Bewick Lucas Ginn (August 28, 1912 – February 3, 2003) was an American businesswoman and Republican political organizer based in Missouri. She was the United States Ambassador to Luxembourg from 1976 until 1977.

== Early life and education ==
Rosemary Lucas was born in Columbia, Missouri, the daughter of Reuben Elmer Lucas and Mary Lulu Bewick Lucas. Her father was a businessman. She graduated from Hickman High School in 1929. She earned a bachelor's degree from the University of Missouri in 1933. In 1971 she received the university's Faculty Alumni Award.

== Career ==
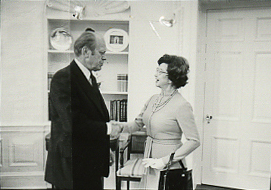
Gerald Ford and Rosemary L. Ginn, shaking hands in the Oval Office, May 1976

Ginn was involved in Republican politics in Missouri. In 1948 she became president of the Boone County Republican Women's Club. She was national president of the Mortar Board honor society from 1948 to 1955. In 1955 she became national president of the Association of College Honor Societies.

From 1959 to 1961 Ginn was president of the Federation of Republican Women's Clubs of Missouri. She was a Missouri delegate to the Republican National Convention in 1960, and was a member of the Republican National Committee's executive committee from 1962 to 1964. She supported the Equal Rights Amendment and abortion rights. She chaired a national party committee to consider rules that would broaden participation in the 1972 Republican National Convention, to include more women and members of minority groups as delegates.

In 1971, Ginn became president of her father's company, Lucas Brothers Publishing Company in Columbia. She was elected chair of the United States Commission for UNESCO in 1974. She attended the UNESCO general conferences in Paris in 1974, and in Bonn in 1975. She considered a run for Thomas Eagleton's Senate seat in 1974 but decided against it, saying "It appears that we have a prospect for a strong candidate and that satisfies me."

Gerald Ford announced his choice of Ginn to succeed Ruth Farkas as ambassador to Luxembourg in May 1976. She was the first woman from Missouri to become an ambassador. In 1980 she was appointed to the Women's Policy Board of the Reagan presidential campaign.

== Personal life ==
Rosemary Lucas married lawyer Milton Stanley Ginn. They had two daughters. She died in 2003, at the age of 90, in Osage Beach, Missouri.
