= Embassy of the United States, Luxembourg =

- Location: Luxembourg City, Luxembourg
- Address: 22 Boulevard Emmanual Servais
- Opened: 1922; 104 years ago
- Ambassador: Stacey Feinberg
- Website: https://lu.usembassy.gov/

The Embassy of the United States of America in Luxembourg City is the diplomatic mission on the United States in Luxembourg. Since 1944, following the liberation of Luxembourg in World War II, both the embassy and Ambassador's residence have been located in the Dolibois House, named after John E. Dolibois, Ambassador to Luxembourg 1981–1985.

== History ==
1922, steel magnate Alfred Lefevre and Albertine Reckinger purchased the property at 22 Boulevard Emmanuel Servais, and built a maison de maître — a grand family house. Designed by Luxembourgish architect Gust Schopen, the house's opulence reflected the wealth Luxembourg's steel industry, centered in Esch-sur-Alzette. However, for unknown reasons, the Lefevres never inhabited their new estate, and in 1929, sold it to the German government, who used it as their embassy.

At 4:35 a.m. on 10 May 1940, Nazi Germany invaded Luxembourg. Within hours, the tiny nation had been annexed entirely. Adolf Hitler then appointed Gustaf Simon as gauleiter (governor), and he set up base at the Lefevre mansion. Simon began a campaign to wipe out Luxembourgish language and culture, all the while hosting such names as composer Richard Strauss at the residence.

On 10 September 1944, the United States Army liberated Luxembourg City. The Lefevre house, in the meanwhile, was used as barracks for American soldiers. In the days following the Battle of the Bulge, the American Chargé d'Affaires to Luxembourg, George Platt Waller, returned after having been forced out in 1941, reestablishing the diplomatic connection between the US and Luxembourg.

Just before leaving Luxembourg permanently, Chargé Waller signed the papers sealing the purchase of the Lefevre mansion from the Luxembourgish government on 24 June 1948 for $155,000 ($1.55 million in 2015 dollars). In fact, the American government got the property for free, as Belgium covered the cost as part of its repayment to the United States under the Lend-Lease program.

The Embassy in Luxembourg has been the home of several 'first-of-their-kind' US ambassadors, including Perle Mesta, one of the first female ambassadors, Patricia Roberts Harris, the first African-American female ambassador, and John E. Dolibois, the first and only native-born Luxembourger. Indeed, of such quality was his service that in October 2003, the United States Senate passed a resolution officially naming the embassy building the Dolibois House, in his honor.

In June 2015, the Luxembourg embassy, along with several other American diplomatic missions, flew the rainbow flag in honor of LGBT Pride Month, which was officially endorsed by US President Barack Obama.
