= Stacey Feinberg =

U.S. Ambassador to Luxembourg

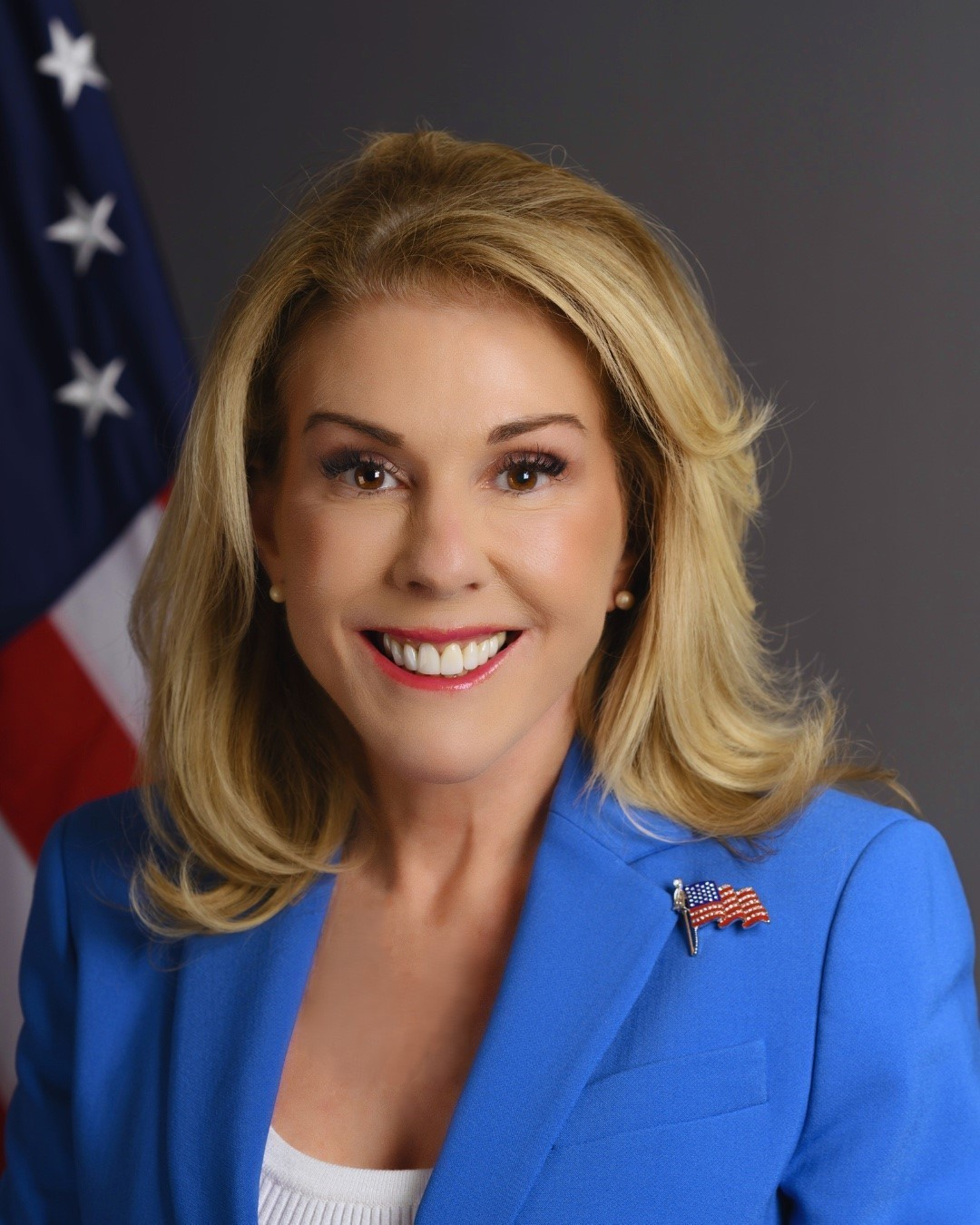
- Official portrait, 2025

United States Ambassador to Luxembourg
- Incumbent
- Assumed office November 13, 2025
- Preceded by: Tom Barrett

Personal details
- Born: Stacey Woolf
- Party: Republican
- Parent: Bob Woolf (father)
- Education: Northwestern University

Stacey Woolf Feinberg is an American businesswoman and diplomat who has served as United States ambassador to Luxembourg since 2025.

== Early life and education ==
Feinberg is the daughter of Bob Woolf, an attorney and sports agent. She attended Northwestern University. She also attended an executive program at Harvard Business School. She has lectured at Harvard Law School on topics related to media, sports, and business.

== Career ==
After graduating from college, Feinberg began her career at her father's firm where she worked as an assistant. She also worked as an entertainment reporter for the Mix 98.5 radio station in Boston, Massachusetts.

Feinberg is the president of the investment firm 33 Capital. She previously served as board director at the Womens Foundation Network. She is a major donor to the Republican Party and to Republican political candidates.

On December 17, 2024, Donald Trump nominated Feinberg to be the United States ambassador to Luxembourg.

In June 2025, the Senate Foreign Relations Committee held a hearing to examine her nomination. During her Senate confirmation hearing, she stated she would "educate Luxembourg about the Chinese threat." She was sharply criticized from both the Chinese and Luxembourgish embassies, with Xavier Bettel insisting that "the country does not need to be educated".

The Senate confirmed her nomination on October 7, 2025. She received her diplomatic credentials upon her confirmation on November 13.

Diplomatic posts
Preceded by Tom Barrett	United States Ambassador to Luxembourg; 2025–present	Incumbent
