= Robert A. Mandell =

American attorney and businessman (born 1947)

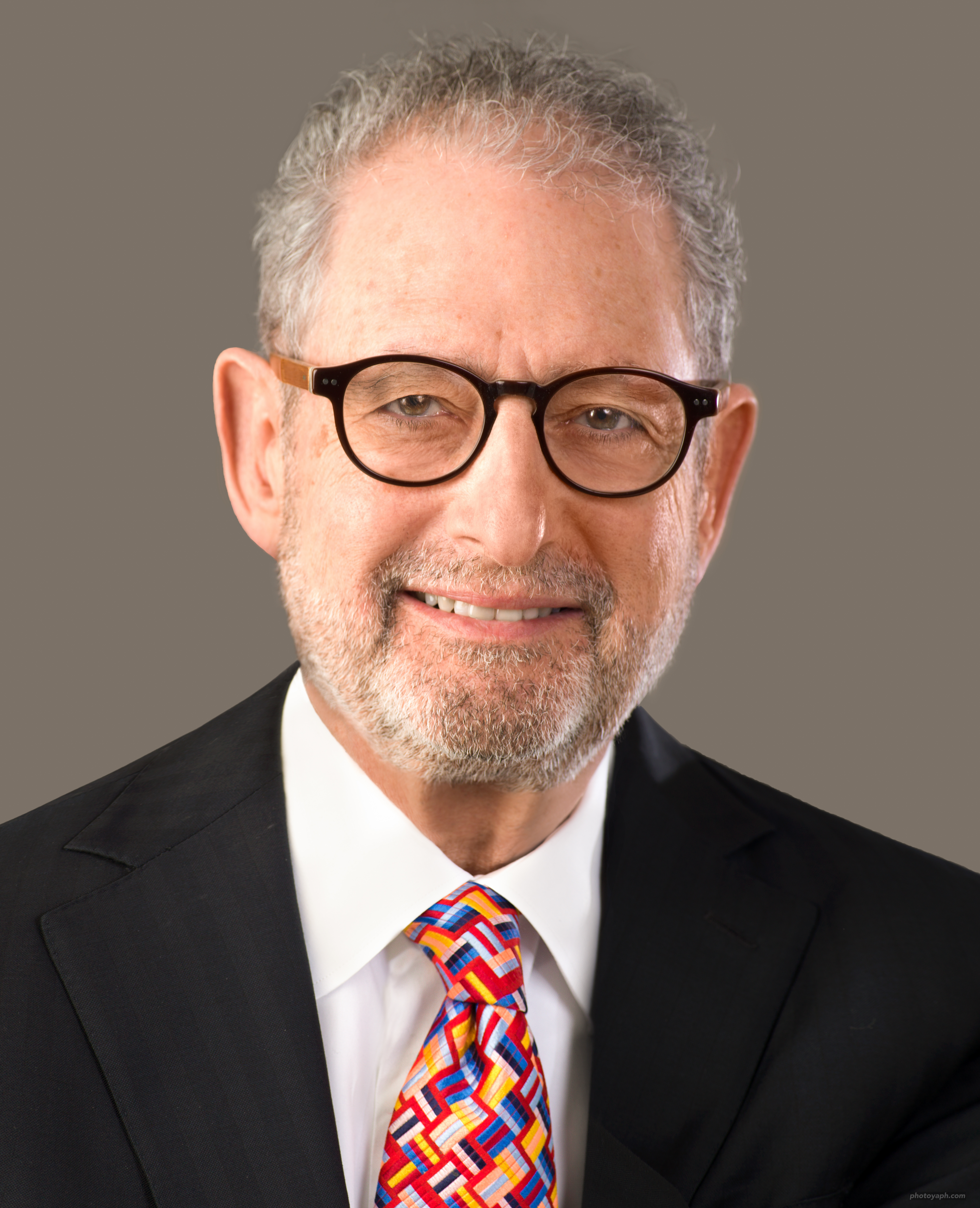

21st United States Ambassador to Luxembourg
- In office November 16, 2011 – February 26, 2015
- President: Barack Obama
- Preceded by: Cynthia Stroum
- Succeeded by: David McKean

Chairman of the Florida Environmental Regulation Commission
- In office 3 January 1987 – 23 December 1990

Personal details
- Born: 1947 (age 78–79) Miami, Florida
- Party: Democratic
- Spouse: Julie Walker Mandell
- Children: 4, including 2 stepchildren
- Education: University of Florida (BS, JD)
- Occupation: Real estate development Lawyer

Robert A. "Bobby" Mandell (born 1947) is an American attorney and businessman who also served as the United States Ambassador to Luxembourg from 2011 to 2015.

Mandell practiced law before moving into family business in real estate development. In addition, he has been active in multiple state and national government bodies, including the Florida Environmental Regulation Commission, the Orlando-Orange County Expressway Authority and the President's Export Council.

Mandell was a major donor to the 2008 and 2012 presidential campaigns of Barack Obama and supported the Hillary Clinton campaign in 2016. In 2019, President Donald Trump appointed Mandell, a Democrat, to the Board of Corporation for Public Broadcasting, a rare instance of Trump appointing a non-Republican to a governmental agency.

== Early life ==
Mandell was born in Miami, Florida in 1947, the son of Lester N. Mandell and Sonia (Margolis) Mandell. He received a bachelor's degree in advertising from the University of Florida in 1969. In 1972, Mandell received his Juris Doctor degree from University of Florida's Fredric G. Levin College of Law. He graduated from Harvard Business School's Owner/President Management Executive Program in 2000.

== Career ==
Following law school in 1972, Mandell worked as a lawyer in Punta Gorda, Florida. He was partner in the firm Wotitzky, Wotitzky, Mandell, Batsel, Wilkins and Frohlich and left active practice in 1983. He is peer-evaluated as "AV" (preeminent) in Martindale-Hubbell's legal listing.

Mandell began work at his father's Central Florida real estate development business, Greater Construction Corporation, in 1984. Greater Construction named Mandell president of the company in 1989 after his father became chairman. Robert Mandell and four partners bought the company from Lester Mandell in 1998, and the company was later renamed Greater Homes. Mandell served as the company's chairman and CEO until national homebuilder Meritage Homes Corporation bought it in 2005, after which he served as president of Meritage Homes of Central Florida. Additionally, Mandell was chairman and CEO of Greater Properties Inc., a commercial real estate development firm.

In addition to those roles, Mandell has served on boards, commissions and authorities in the private and public sectors. In 1987 Republican Gov. Bob Martinez named Mandell to the Florida Environmental Regulation Commission, where he served as chairman until 1990. Martinez then appointed Mandell to the Orlando-Orange County Expressway Authority, where he served from 1990 to 1995, held the chairman and vice chairman posts, and was known for reducing tolls and successfully pushing Florida's E-Pass electronic toll collection system. He has served on the boards of Florida Hospital in Orlando, Sanford-Burnham Medical Research Institute in LaJolla, and Vermont Studio Center, among others.

President Barack Obama named Mandell to the President's Export Council in 2010.

In 2022, president Joe Biden appointed him to the President's Advisory Committee on the Arts.

== Ambassadorship ==
President Barack Obama nominated Mandell as the U.S. ambassador to Luxembourg in June 2011. As with other political appointees who have not previously served in such posts, several media outlets noted that Mandell had no diplomatic experience and had been a prominent fundraiser for Obama; Mandell donated $30,000 to Obama's campaign and $50,000 to his inauguration committee in 2008. Mandell raised more than $200,000 for the 2008 Obama campaign and was one of two dozen bundlers that were nominated for ambassador positions. Mandell's confirmation hearing took place in September, and the U.S. Senate approved his nomination by voice vote on October 18, 2011.

Mandell was sworn in on October 25, 2011. He presented his credentials on November 16, 2011. When Mandell arrived in Luxembourg, he filled the post left vacant following the resignation of Seattle venture capitalist Cynthia Stroum.

Mandell's tenure was notable for the founding of the Luxembourg Forum, meetings between United States Supreme Court justices and judges of the European Court of Justice, with the goal of identifying and working on legal issues where cooperation can provide a mutual benefit. In addition, during Mandell's ambassadorship the embassy worked with the government of Luxembourg to create a quarterly forum of U.S. business leaders, business leaders in Luxembourg, and officials of Luxembourg's government, with the intent of exploring opportunities for U.S. companies to expand in Luxembourg.

Mandell resigned his ambassadorship in February 2015, saying it was time for him and his wife to return to private life in the U.S. On February 12, Luxembourg Grand Duke Henri honored Mandell by naming him a Commander of the Order of the Oak Crown an award that recognizes individuals for exceptional civil and military services.

== Later career ==
In 2016, he was a prominent supporter of Hillary Clinton for president. In March 2019, Mandell was appointed to the board of directors of the Corporation for Public Broadcasting by President Trump and confirmed by the Senate. His term expired in 2022.

== Personal life ==
Mandell is married to Julie Walker Mandell and has four children, including two stepchildren. He lives in Winter Park, Florida.

Diplomatic posts
| Preceded by Cynthia Stroum | United States Ambassador to Luxembourg; 2011–2016 | Succeeded by David McKean |
