= Bernard Carter (banker) =

American soldier and banker (1893–1961)

- Born: Bernard Shirley Carter; May 29, 1893; Biarritz, France
- Died: November 8, 1961 (aged 68); Paris, France
- Education: Groton School; Harvard Law School
- Alma mater: Harvard University
- Spouse: Louise Hope Thacher (m. 1915)
- Children: 4
- Parent(s): John Ridgeley Carter; Alice Morgan Carter
- Relatives: Mildred, Countess of Gosford (sister); Archibald Acheson, 6th Earl of Gosford (nephew); William Fellowes Morgan Sr. (uncle); William Fellowes Morgan Jr. (cousin)
- Awards: Purple Heart, Bronze Star, Legion of Merit, Croix de Guerre, Legion of Honour

Bernard "Bunny" Shirley Carter (May 29, 1893 – November 8, 1961) was an American soldier and banker with Morgan, Harjes & Co. who lived in Paris.

== Early life ==
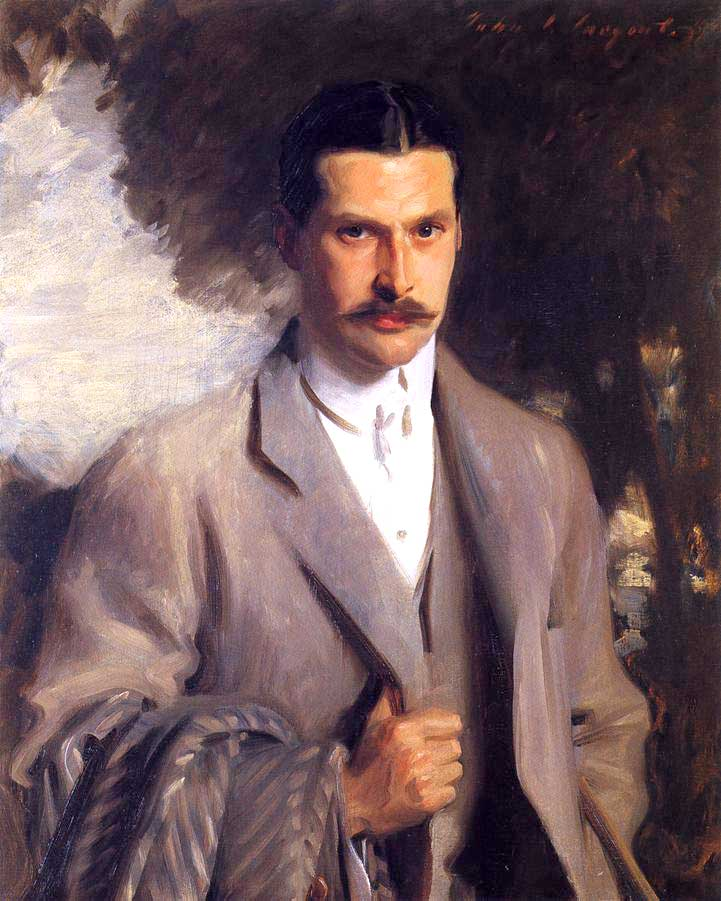
Portrait of Carter's father, John Ridgeley Carter, by John Singer Sargent, 1901

Carter was born in Biarritz, France on May 29, 1893. He was the only son of diplomat and banker John Ridgeley Carter and Alice (née Morgan) Carter. His sister, Caroline Mildred Carter, married Archibald, Viscount Acheson (later the 5th Earl of Gosford), in 1910.

His father was one of fourteen children born to Mary Buckner (née Ridgeley) Carter and Bernard Carter, a prominent lawyer and professor. Through his paternal grandfather, he was a member of the prominent Calvert, Carter and Lee families of Virginia and was a direct descendant of Henry Lee III, the 9th Governor of Virginia, and George Calvert, 1st Baron Baltimore, the first colonial proprietor of the Province of Maryland. His maternal grandparents were Carolyn (née Fellowes) Morgan and banker David Pierce Morgan. His maternal uncle was William Fellowes Morgan Sr., a member of the New Jersey General Assembly (and close friend of Theodore Roosevelt), who married the well-known tennis and golf player Emma Leavitt. His cousin, William Fellowes Morgan Jr., was the Commissioner of Public Markets for New York City.

Carter spent most of his early youth abroad while his father was in the diplomatic service. He was educated at the Groton School in Groton, Massachusetts where he graduated in 1911. He attended Harvard College, graduating in 1915, followed by Harvard Law School, but withdrew in 1917 to enter the Army during World War I. He was wounded at the Front in 1918 while serving as a second lieutenant with the 103rd Infantry Regiment. After his injury, he served as a liaison officer with the French Eighth and Tenth Armies.

== Career ==
After the War, he joined the private bank of J.P. Morgan & Co. in New York. In 1921, he went to London to work in the office of Morgan, Grenfell & Co., merchant bankers with close ties to the New York Morgan firm. The following year he joined Morgan, Harjes & Cie in Paris, before becoming a partner in 1924. After the death of Henry Herman Harjes in August 1926, his father became senior partner of the firm which was renamed Morgan & Cie. Carter had a part in substantial loans floated in the United States by the Morgan firm on behalf of European governments and industries during reconstruction after the Great War. The firm was also active in financing American companies entering the European market.

When the firm changed from a partnership to a corporation in 1945, Carter was elected president. He became chairman of the board in 1955 (succeeding Nelson Dean Jay), serving until 1959 when the Morgan bank was merged with the Guaranty Trust Company of New York. After the merger, Carter was named chairman of the policy committee and a member of the directory advisory council of the Morgan Guaranty Trust Company, a role he retained until his death in 1961.

Early in World War II, Carter directed American Red Cross activities in Britain and Northern Ireland. In 1942, he rejoined the Army as an intelligence officer. For the remainder of the war, he served on the staff of Gen. George S. Patton and participated in the North African campaign, the invasion of Sicily, the invasion of Normandy and others. In January 1945, he was transferred to the Office of Strategic Services (predecessor to the Central Intelligence Agency) in Paris and was demobilized seven months later with the rank of Colonel. During the Nazi occupation of France, his wife and family moved to New York, where they also had a home at 55 East 72nd Street in Manhattan, but returned after the war. During the two wars he earned the Purple Heart, the Bronze Star and the Legion of Merit and from the French government he earned the Croix de Guerre with Palms for World War I and II and the rosette of a commander of the Legion of Honour.

== Personal life ==
In February 1915, Carter was married to Louise Hope Thacher (1895–1984), at Trinity Church in Boston. She was a daughter of Louise (née Leavitt) Thacher and U.S. Representative Thomas Chandler Thacher. Louise's mother was the sister of Emma Leavitt-Morgan, the wife of Carter's uncle William. Together, they were the parents of:

- Alice Mildred Carter (1915–1994), who was introduced to society in Boston in 1933 and who married Philip Boyer Jr., a grandson of W. Allston Flagg and great-grandson of Moncure Robinson, in 1937.
- Bernard Shirley Carter Jr. (1917–2002), who married Elizabeth Ann Wills, a daughter of Dr. Harry Calvin Wills of Grand Rapids, Michigan.
- John Timothy Carter (1922–1928), who died young.
- David Ridgeley Carter (1929–2009), also a banker who served as vice president of Morgan Guaranty Trust Company in Paris and a member of the board of directors of the American Hospital of Paris; he married Pauline de Leusse, a daughter of the Comtesse Paul de Leusse of the Château de Valgenceuse at Senlis, Oise.

In 1953, his wife was made a chevalier of the French Legion of Honour for her more than thirty years of charitable work in France, particularly among the war blind. After a long illness, Carter died in Paris on November 8, 1961. His widow died in 1984.

=== Social life and volunteer work ===
They lived in Paris and, in 1928, they purchased what was previously known as Hôtel Germain, a hôtel particulier in Senlis. The house, a 10,800 square feet mansion, with more than 14 bedrooms, became a gathering place for diplomats, journalists and members of the Parisian beau monde. Notable guests included Gen. Dwight D. Eisenhower, columnist Walter Lippmann, author Louis Bromfield and various aristocrats, diplomats, expatriates and visiting Americans. The home, still owned by the Carter family, was featured in the 2003 film Le Divorce, directed by James Ivory from Merchant Ivory Productions.

Carter served as the honorary treasurer of the International Chamber of Commerce and president of the board of governors of the American Hospital of Paris. He was also a trustee of the American Library of Paris and a vestryman of the American Pro-Cathedral in Paris and as European vice president of the Associated Harvard Clubs.

In New York, he was a member of the Brook Club and Racquet and Tennis Club. In Washington, D.C., he was a member of the Metropolitan Club and, in London, a member of the Buck's Club. In Paris, he was a member of the Travellers Club, the Union interalliées, the Harvard Club of France and the American Club of Paris.

=== Descendants ===
Through his son David, he was a grandfather of Sylvia, Natalie, and Laura Carter, and a great-grandfather of the French journalist and writer, Nicolas d'Estienne d'Orves (b. 1974), Natalie de Watrigant, Charles de Watrigant, Joseph Sainderichin, and Noe Sainderichin.
