= Louisa Acheson, Countess of Gosford =

British countess (1856–1925)

The Right Honourable The Countess of Gosford DBE

Lady of the Bedchamber to Queen Alexandra
- In office 1901 – 20 November 1925

Personal details
- Born: Lady Louisa Augusta Beatrice Montagu; 17 January 1856
- Died: 3 March 1944 (aged 88)
- Spouse: Archibald Acheson, 4th Earl of Gosford (m. 1876; died 1922)
- Children: Archibald Acheson, 5th Earl of Gosford; Lady Alexandra Stanley; Lady Mary Ward; Lady Theodosia Cadogan; Capt. Patrick Acheson
- Parents: William Montagu, 7th Duke of Manchester; Countess Luise Friederike Auguste von Alten

Louisa Augusta Beatrice Acheson, Countess of Gosford, DBE (née Lady Louisa Montagu; 17 January 1856 – 3 March 1944) was the wife of the 4th Earl of Gosford.

== Early life ==
Lady Gosford was the third of five children born to Countess Louisa van Alten by her first husband, William Montagu, 7th Duke of Manchester. Her older brother, George, became the 8th Duke of Manchester and married Cuban-American heiress Consuelo Yznaga. Her elder sister, Lady Mary Louisa Elizabeth Montagu, married William Douglas-Hamilton, 12th Duke of Hamilton, and her younger siblings were Lord Charles William Augustus Montagu (husband of the Hon. Mildred Cecilia Harriet Stuart, daughter of Henry Sturt, 1st Baron Alington), and Lady Alice Maude Olivia Montagu (wife of Edward Stanley, 17th Earl of Derby).

After her father's death in 1890, her mother remarried to Spencer Cavendish, 8th Duke of Devonshire, becoming the Duchess of Devonshire, and was known in society as the "Double Duchess".

== Personal life ==
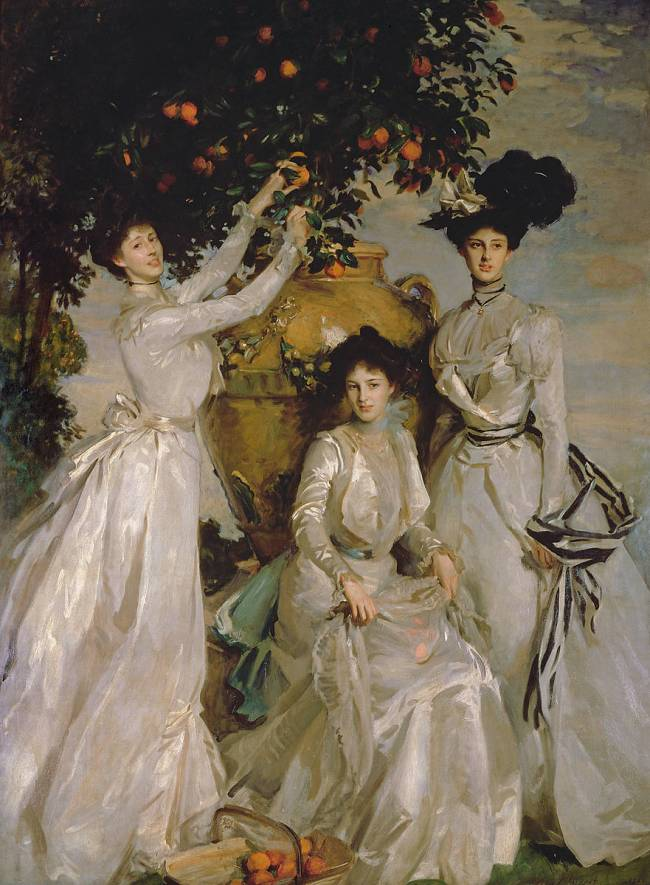
The Acheson Sisters (Ladies Alexandra, Mary and Theo Acheson), Lady Gosford's daughters, by John Singer Sargent, 1902

On 10 August 1876, Lady Louisa was married to Archibald Acheson, 4th Earl of Gosford in Market Hill, County Armagh, Ireland. Lord Gosford was the son of the 3rd Earl of Gosford and Lady Theodosia Brabazon (a daughter of John Brabazon, 10th Earl of Meath). Together, they were the parents of:

- Archibald Charles Montagu Brabazon Acheson, 5th Earl of Gosford (1877–1954), who married Mildred Caroline Carter, the only daughter of American diplomat John Ridgeley Carter (a descendant of Henry Lee III, the 9th Governor of Virginia) and Alice (née Morgan) Carter (sister of William Fellowes Morgan).
- Lady Alexandra Louise Elizabeth Acheson (1878–1958), who married Lt.-Col. Hon. William Frederick Stanley.
- Lady Mary Acheson (b. 1881), who married Hon. Robert Arthur Ward.
- Lady Theodosia Louisa Augusta Acheson (1882–1977), who married Alexander Cadogan.
- Captain the Honourable Patrick George Edward Cavendish Acheson (1883–1957)

From 1901 to 1925, she served as a Lady of the Bedchamber to Queen Alexandra, the wife of King Edward VII.

During the First World War Lady Gosford was president of the Central Workrooms of the British Red Cross Society, and for this work she was appointed Dame Commander of the Order of the British Empire (DBE) in the 1920 civilian war honours.

Lord Gosford died on 11 April 1922. Lady Gosford lived another twenty two years until her death on 3 March 1944.
