= Mildred, Countess of Gosford =

American heiress (1888–1965)

The Right Honourable The Countess of Gosford
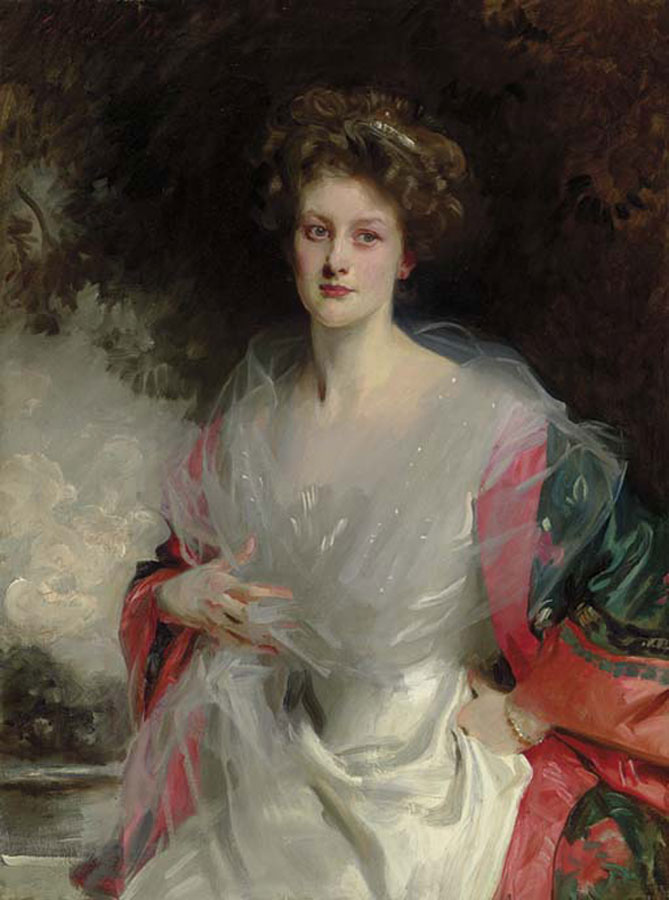
- Portrait of Mildred, by John Singer Sargent, 1908
- Born: Caroline Mildred Carter; March 2, 1888; Cambridge, Massachusetts, U.S.
- Died: September 7, 1965 (aged 77); Bondo, Switzerland
- Spouse: Archibald Acheson, 5th Earl of Gosford (m. 1910; div. 1927)
- Children: 5, including the 6th Earl of Gosford
- Parent(s): John Ridgeley Carter; Alice Morgan Carter
- Relatives: Bernard Carter (brother)

Mildred Acheson, Countess of Gosford (born Caroline Mildred Carter) (March 2, 1888 – September 7, 1965) was an American heiress who married into the British aristocracy.

== Early life ==
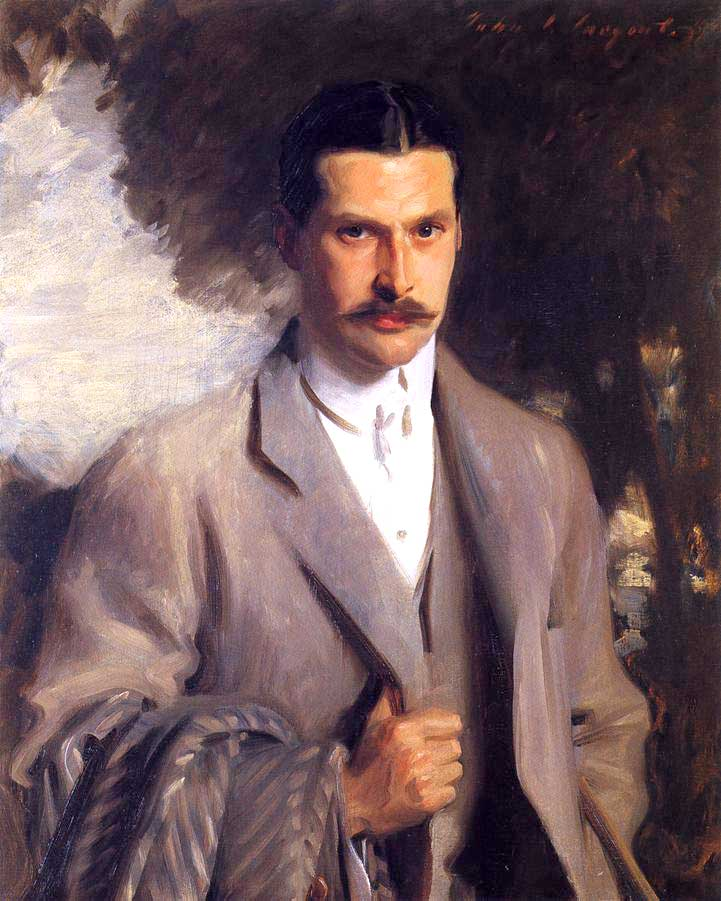
Her father, John Ridgeley Carter, by John Singer Sargent, 1901.

Mildred was born on March 2, 1888, in Cambridge, Massachusetts. Millie, as she was also known, was the only daughter of diplomat John Ridgeley Carter (1864–1944) and Alice (née Morgan) Carter (1865–1933). Her younger brother was banker Bernard Shirley Carter, a prominent banker with Morgan, Harjes & Co. who married Louise Hope Thacher.

Her paternal grandparents were Mary Buckner (née Ridgely) Carter and Bernard Carter, a member of the prominent Carter and Lee families of Virginia and was a descendant of Henry Lee III, the 9th Governor of Virginia. Her maternal grandparents were David Pierce Morgan and Carolyn (née Fellowes) Morgan. Her maternal uncle was William Fellowes Morgan Sr. and among her first cousins was William Fellowes Morgan Jr.

Her father was a diplomat of the United States, serving as the First Secretary to the American Embassy in London. Later, he served as the U.S. Minister at Bucharest from November 14, 1909, until October 24, 1911. He also concurrently served as the U.S. Minister to Serbia and Bulgaria.

In May 1908, noted American portrait painter John Singer Sargent painted a portrait of Mildred in London that was described at the time by The New York Times as "in the painter's best manner and brings out all of the innate sweetness of nature which has endeared Miss Carter to her English as much as to her American friends, all of whom agree that she has the wonderful tact and urbanity of her father." She was presented at the Court of St James's in 1909.

== Personal life ==
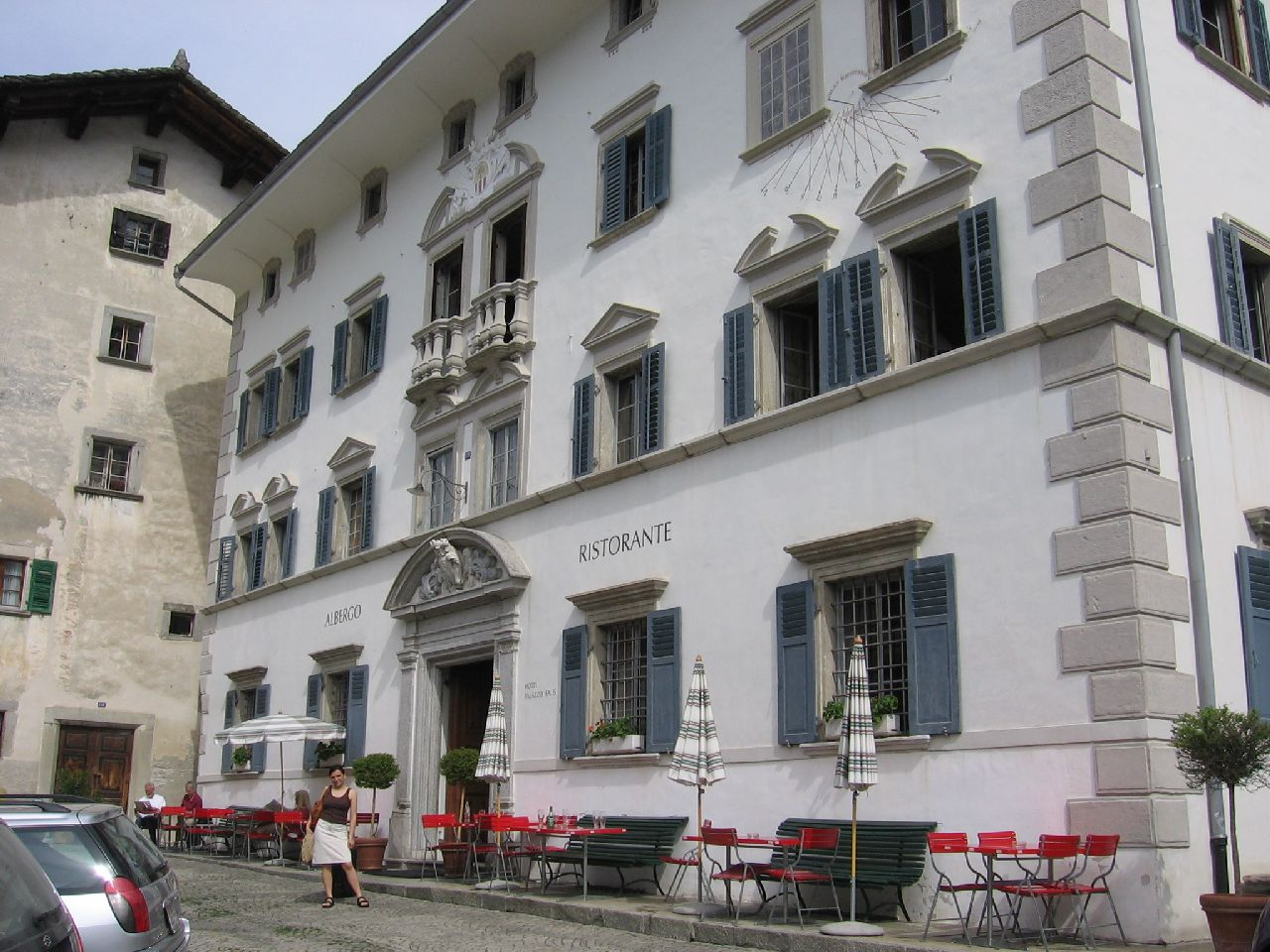
Lady Acheson's home in Switzerland, Palazzo Salis.

On June 21, 1910, Mildred was married to Archibald Acheson, Viscount Acheson at St George's Hanover Square Church in London followed by a reception at Dorchester House. (Note: Mildred had seven bridesmaids at her wedding, Lady Theodosia Acheson, sister of the bridegroom (later the wife of Alexander Cadogan); Lady Victoria Stanley (a daughter of Edward Stanley, 17th Earl of Derby, later the wife of Neil James Archibald Primrose), Miss Elsie Nicoll of New York (sister of Courtlandt Nicoll), Mlle. Irene de Lagrange, Miss Camilla Morgan, the Hon. Rhoda Astley, and Miss Marian Scranton.) The Viscount Acheson was the eldest son, and eventual heir, of Archibald Acheson, 4th Earl of Gosford and Lady Louisa Montagu, a Lady-in-Waiting to Queen Alexandra. His paternal grandfather was Archibald Acheson, 3rd Earl of Gosford and his maternal grandparents were William Montagu, 7th Duke of Manchester and the former Countess Louisa von Alten. Together, Mildred and Archibald were the parents of the five children:

- Archibald Alexander John Stanley Acheson, 6th Earl of Gosford (1911–1966), who married Francesca Cagiati, eldest daughter of Francesco Cagiati. They divorced in 1960 and he remarried to Cynthia Margaret Delius, the widow of Maj. James Pringle Delius and daughter of Capt. Henry Cave West MC.
- Lady Patricia Acheson (1913–1913), who died in infancy.
- Hon. Patrick Bernard Victor Montagu Acheson (1915–2005), who married Judith Gillette, a daughter of Earle P. Gillette.
- Lady Mildred Camilla Nichola Acheson (1917–1965), who married Baron Hans Christoph Freiherr Schenk von Stauffenberg in 1937. She later married Axel Freiherr von dem Bussche-Streithorst in 1950.
- Lady Mary Virginia Shirley Acheson (1919–1996), who married Fernando Corcuera in Mexico in 1941.

Viscount Acheson's father died in 1922 (shortly after selling the family seat Gosford Castle) and he succeeded to the earldom of Gosford. Five years later in 1927, the couple separated and Lord Gosford went to New York City. The Countess of Gosford obtained a divorce in December 1927, and he remarried to Beatrice (née Claflin) Breese, a granddaughter of merchant Horace Brigham Claflin, on October 1, 1928.

Mildred died on September 7, 1965, at Palazzo Salis, her home in Bondo, Switzerland.

=== Descendants ===
Through her youngest daughter, Lady Mary, he was a grandfather of Jaime Corcuera Acheson (born 1955), who married Archduchess Myriam of Austria, a daughter of Archduke Felix of Austria and granddaughter of King Charles I of Austria, in 1983.
