= William Fellowes Morgan =

William Fellowes Morgan may refer to:

- William Fellowes Morgan Sr. (1860–1943), American banker, businessman, and politician
- William Fellowes Morgan Jr. (1889–1977), American businessman and public official
