= Archibald Acheson =

Archibald Acheson may refer to one of a number of British noblemen:

- Sir Archibald Acheson, 1st Baronet (1583–1634), Scottish jurist
- Archibald Acheson, 1st Viscount Gosford (1718–1790), British politician, great-grandson of the first Baronet
- Archibald Acheson, 2nd Earl of Gosford (1776–1849), British politician and Governor-General of British North America, grandson of the first Viscount
- Archibald Acheson, 3rd Earl of Gosford (1806–1864), son of the second Earl
- Archibald Acheson, 4th Earl of Gosford (1841–1922), son of the third Earl
- Archibald Acheson, 5th Earl of Gosford (1877–1954), son of the fourth Earl
- Archibald Acheson, 6th Earl of Gosford (1911–1966), son of the fifth Earl
