= John R. Carter =

John R. Carter may refer to:

- John Carter (Texas politician) (born 1941), U.S. Representative from Texas
- John R. Carter (diplomat) (1864–1944), American attorney, diplomat and banker
