= Rovno Ghetto =

Nazi ghetto in occupied Ukraine

Coordinates: 50°37′N 26°15′E

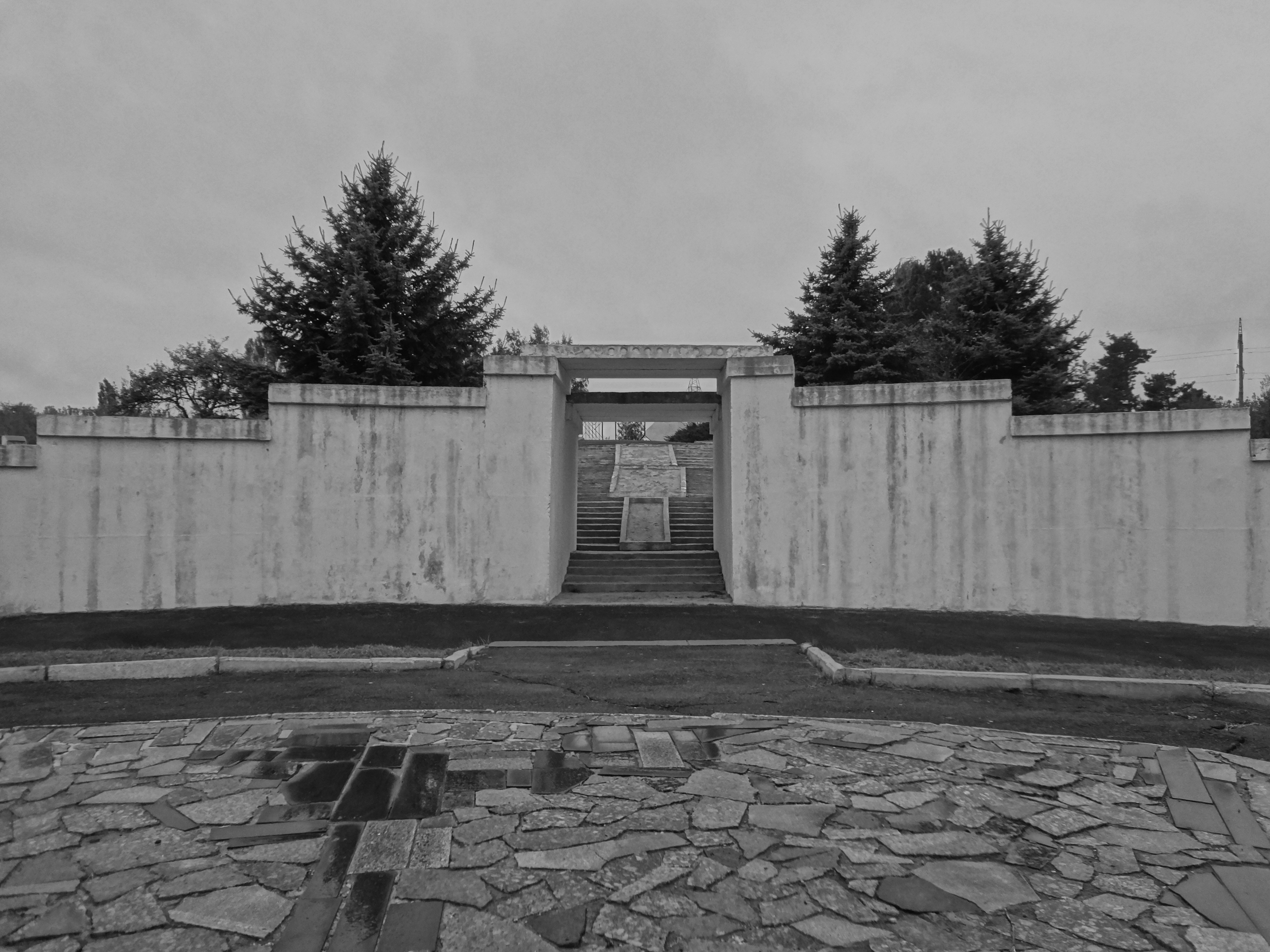
- Location of Sosenki (Сосонки) Forest massacres of the Rovno Ghetto prisoners, 2014

- Ghetto's location at Rovno (Równe in pre-war eastern Poland)

- Rivne in modern-day Ukraine
- Location: Near Rivne in western Ukraine (Równe in pre-war eastern Poland)
- Date: October 1941
- Incident type: Forced labor, mass shootings
- Perpetrators: Einsatzgruppe C, Order Police battalions, Ukrainian Auxiliary Police
- Organizations: SS
- Ghetto: 5,200 to 7,000 Jews
- Victims: about 23,000 Jews

The Rovno Ghetto (also: Równe or Rivne Ghetto, Yiddish: ראָװנע) (Note: The name Równe is from the Polish language. In the Holocaust literature, the modern city of Rivne is predominantly known as Rovno, from the Russian language.) was a World War II Nazi ghetto established in December 1941 in the city of Rovno, western Ukraine, in the territory of German-administered Reichskommissariat Ukraine. On 6 November 1941, about 21,000 Jews were massacred by Einsatzgruppe C and their Ukrainian collaborators. The remaining Jews were imprisoned in the ghetto. In July 1942, the remaining 5,000 Jews were trucked to a stone quarry near Kostopol and murdered there.

The ghetto was liquidated on July 13, 1942. Only a handful of Jews managed to escape deportation.

== Background ==
The city of Równe was the largest agglomeration in the province of Volhynia (Wołyń) of the Second Polish Republic. About 25,000 Jews lived in Równe, Wołyń Voivodeship in 1937. The town was a center for Jewish education with many Jewish schools including a Hasidic religious school (yeshiva).

Located in the south-eastern region of Kresy, about 80 kilometres (50 mi) west of the interwar border between Poland and the Soviet Union, Równe was occupied by the Red Army upon the Soviet invasion of Poland on September 17, 1939 and incorporated into the Ukrainian SSR.

When German troops invaded the Soviet Union in June 1941, the city fell to the Wehrmacht on June 28, 1941. On August 20, 1941, Rovno was declared the capital of German Reichskommissariat Ukraine. The Jewish ghetto in the city of Rovno was set up by the German administration soon after the Reichskommissariat Ukraine was formed.

At the beginning of the German occupation, around 23,000 Polish Jews resided in Rovno along with refugees from western Poland, who made up half the population of the city.

When the Nazis captured the city from the Soviets, they carried out several executions of its Jewish population.

== Creation and liquidation ==
In December 1941 an open ghetto was created in the Wola neighborhood, on the edge of Rovno, and 5,200 Jews initially lived there. The destruction of the Jewish people of Rovno occurred in three phases.

1. About 3,000-4,000 Jews were killed in July and August. On 9 and 12 July 1941, the Einsatzkommando 4A of Einsatzgruppe C, a death squad, shot 240 Jews. The official German report described the victims as 'Bolshevik agents' and 'Jewish functionaries'. On August 6, Order Police battalions conducted a second campaign in Rovno, in which about 300 Jews were shot.
2. The bloodiest shooting took place November 6–7, 1941, when 15,000-18,000 adult Jews were killed. The operation was led by the commander of the Order Police, Otto von Oelhafen, with the assistance of Ukrainian Auxiliary Police and members of the OUN in the Sosenki forest near Rovno (Sosenki English:Little Pine Trees). Jews were shot by Police Battalion 320 in coordination with the Einsatzgruppe 5th Division. Separately. 6,000 children had their necks broken or were buried alive under other victims at a killing site close to the adult one.
3. The ghetto was liquidated in July 1942. On the night of July 13, 1942 at 22:00, the liquidation of the ghetto was carried out when a "shared" division of the SS and Ukrainian police units surrounded the ghetto, positioned spotlights around it and turned them on. Small groups of brigade SS and Ukrainian police broke into houses and pushed people out, herded them onto a freight train which took them to Kostopol or Prokhurov, where they were shot to death in small Aktionen. 5,000 Jews were killed in this manner. Several Aktionen took place in the neighbourhood afterwards.

The ghetto was declared "Judenrein"at the end of July by the Reichskommissar Erich Koch.

The remaining 5,000 Jews possessed skills deemed essential to the administration of the occupation were taken away from their families and placed in the ghetto. An estimated 22,000-23,000 Jews were killed in Rovno.

On February 2, 1944 Rivne was liberated from the Germans by Soviet troops of the 1st Ukrainian Front during the Rovno-Lutsk operation.

== Life in the ghetto ==
The ghetto had a Judenrat of 12 people. The men appointed to head the Judenrat were Moses and Jacob Bergman (Leon) Suharchuk. They both committed suicide at the end of 1941 because they did not want to follow the Nazis' demand to turn over a group of Jews. Jews living in the ghetto had to pay levies to the German authorities, in one operation, 12 million rubles. German authorities also confiscated any gold, jewelry, furniture or clothing that remained in Jews' possession. At the time of the operation, Jews were selling clothes to get food. The most valuable items were sent to Germany, the rest either given to German soldiers and Ukrainian policemen or sold to them for symbolic prices. In the ghetto numerous restrictions were imposed on Jews, including a requirement to wear a distinctive badge.

== Resistance ==
Underground organizations operated in the ghetto and accumulated weapons.

150 Jews were saved by an engineer working for the local Reichsbahn, Hermann Graebe, as the ghetto was being liquidated. The Jews who managed to escape deportation joined the partisans and later took part in the liberation of Rovno by the Red Army in the Battle of Rovno, in February 1944. The surviving Jews began to gather in the city after the arrival of the Red Army, and by the end of 1944, some 1,200 Jews were accounted for in Rovno; among them, future author David Lee Preston (The Sewer People of Lvov) and his family.

== Commemoration ==
A memorial was created in 1992 on the site of the Sosenski massacre. On June 6, 2012, the memorial was vandalized, allegedly as part of an antisemitic act.

On December 13, 2019, at the site of the former ghetto entrance, a monument to the victims of the Rivne ghetto was unveiled by the NGO Mnemonika in partnership with the Jewish community of Düsseldorf. It consists of a half-destroyed wall built from bricks from one of the houses in the ghetto territory, a suitcase as a symbol of the forced eviction to the ghetto and the hardships of the Holocaust victims, and a menorah as a symbol of Jewish tradition.

== See also ==
Aktionen: mass killing operations of Jews in neighboring settlements

- Mizocz Ghetto (30 kilometres (19 mi) distance)
- Trochenbrod (Zofiówka) (40 kilometres (25 mi) distance)
- Łuck Ghetto (50 kilometres (31 mi) distance)
