= Charles Acheson, 7th Earl of Gosford =

British peer and artist

Charles David Alexander John Sparrow Acheson, 7th Earl of Gosford (born 13 July 1942) is a British peer and artist. He was a member of the House of Lords from 1966 to 1999.

The son of Archibald Alexander John Stanley Acheson, 6th Earl of Gosford, and his wife Francesca Augusta Maria Cagiati, he was educated at Harrow School, the Byam Shaw School of Art, and the Royal Academy Schools.

On 17 February 1966, he succeeded his father as Earl of Gosford (1806), Viscount Gosford (1785), Baron Gosford of Market Hill (1776), Baron Acheson of Clancairney (1847), and Baron Worlingham of Beccles (1835), and also as the 13th Acheson baronet in the baronetage of Nova Scotia (1628). The later two baronies are in the peerage of the United Kingdom and gave him a seat in the House of Lords from 1966 to 1999. He took his seat in 1977. He is only recorded to have spoken there once, in 1982, in defence of native rights in the Canada Bill, and was subject to the sanction "that the noble Lord be no longer heard."

He was Chairman of the Artists' Union from 1976 to 1980.

In 1983, Gosford married Lynette Redmond.

The former family seat was Gosford Castle, which was not lived in after 1921, when the contents were sold. The 6th Earl sold the surrounding estate to the Northern Ireland Forestry Commission in 1958.
