= Axel von dem Bussche =

German officer and member of the German Resistance in Second World War

Axel Freiherr von dem Bussche
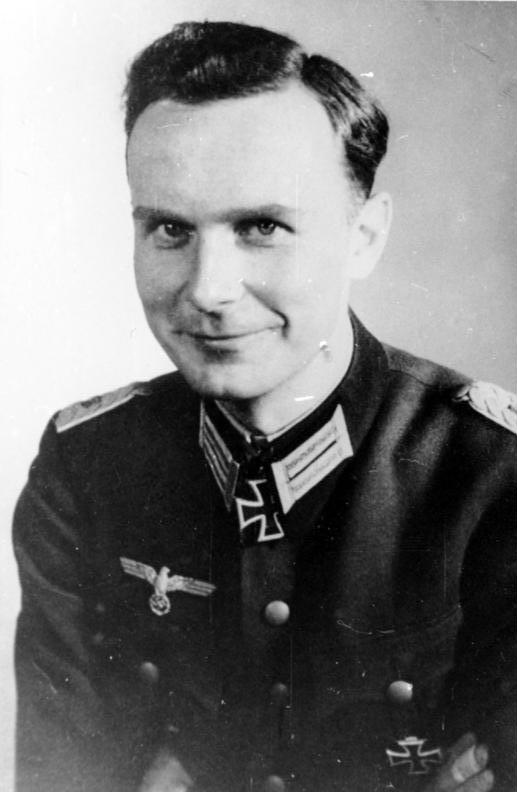
- Bussche in 1943
- Born: 24 April 1919; Brunswick, Weimar Republic
- Died: 26 January 1993 (aged 73); Bonn, Germany
- Relatives: Anders Lassen (first cousin); Archibald Acheson, 5th Earl of Gosford (father in law); Prince Constantijn of the Netherlands (godson); Prince Claus of the Netherlands (cousin); Wolf von dem Bussche (first cousin)
- Military career
- Allegiance: Nazi Germany
- Branch: German Army
- Service years: 1937–1945
- Rank: Major
- Conflicts: World War II
- Awards: Knight's Cross of the Iron Cross
- Other work: Diplomat, scholar

Axel Ernst-August Clamor Franz Albrecht Erich Leo Freiherr von dem Bussche-Streithorst (German: [ˈaksl̩ ˈfʁaɪ̯ˌhɛʁ fɔn dɛm ˈbʊʃə]; 24 April 1919 – 26 January 1993) was a German officer during World War II and was a member of the German Resistance. He planned to assassinate Adolf Hitler in coordination with Claus von Stauffenberg in November 1943 at the Wolfsschanze.

In 1942, von dem Bussche witnessed by chance an SS-organised gruesome massacre of more than 3,000 mostly Jewish civilians carried out by the SD at the old Dubno airport. This experience traumatized him and turned him decidedly against Hitler. He joined an ad hoc resistance group within Army Group Centre later to be led by Count Claus von Stauffenberg. In 1943 he volunteered for a suicide assassination attempt on Hitler while modeling uniforms.

== Early life and career ==
Axel von dem Bussche was born in 1919 and came from the old East Westphalian noble family von dem Bussche. He was the son of Georg Freiherr von dem Bussche-Streithorst and his Danish wife Jenny Lassen. Anders Lassen, a Danish resistance hero who fought in the British Army against Germany during World War II, was his first cousin. He had two siblings; his older brother Cuno died in World War II. He attended elementary school in the town of Thale and passed his Abitur in Munich in 1937. After graduating from high school, he joined the 9th Infantry Regiment of the 23rd Infantry Division in Potsdam (called "Count Nine Regiment" because of its high proportion of noble officers) as an officer candidate. As it turns out, a whole series of resistance fighters would emerge from this regiment. In 1938-1939 he attended the war school in Hanover. During World War II, he first took part in the Polish and French campaigns, and later in the war against the Soviet Union.

== Resistance to Hitler ==
As early as 1940, during a stay in Breslau, he learned of pogroms against the civilian population. On 5 October 1942, at the age of 23, the highly decorated first lieutenant happened to witness the systematic mass execution of over three thousand mostly Jewish civilians—men, women, and children—at the Dubno airfield in Ukraine. The killings were carried out over two days by SD officers, who were led by eight SS officers. Von dem Bussche described this crime: "SS people led the Jews to a pit. There they had to undress, then climb into the pit where a layer of convulsing bodies was already lying: obeying orders, they had to lie face down on the murdered victims and were then shot in the back of the head."

Until then, the career officer von dem Bussche had felt bound by the personal oath to Adolf Hitler. After these events, he asked himself and a small circle of like-minded individuals in the regiment (to which Richard von Weizsäcker, later elected President of Germany, also belonged), why he should still be bound by this oath, which is based on respect and reciprocity, when the Führer had already broken it with the crimes he had ordered. Three months after his traumatic witnessing of the mass execution, Bussche's decision was clear: it could no longer be a question of sacrificing one's own life on the battlefield, but of using it for Germany against Hitler. This experience, from which he never recovered until his death many years later, motivated him to consciously join the resistance group around Claus Schenk Graf von Stauffenberg against the Hitler regime through the mediation of Fritz-Dietlof von der Schulenburg.

In October 1943 he traveled to Lieutenant Colonel von Stauffenberg in Berlin. Von dem Bussche, who had been promoted to captain and now worked as a battalion commander in the 9th Grenadier Regiment, was deeply impressed by the encounter with Stauffenberg. He later spoke of "the bright glow of this man's assured composure". Bussche explained that in view of the crimes he witnessed involuntarily, there were only three ways for an officer to protect his honor "by joining the group of victims" — i.e. to die in battle, to desert, or to rebel against the government that had ordered this and all other massacres. Von dem Bussche was initiated into the conspiracy plans against Hitler by Stauffenberg. When Stauffenberg asked him, he agreed without hesitation to sacrifice his life in a suicide attack on Hitler. He later justified his intention to kill with the emergency aid paragraph of the German penal code (§ 32 StGB), which he had had to memorize as a recruit in Potsdam.

== Attempted assassination of Hitler ==
In November 1943 von dem Bussche volunteered to carry out a suicide bombing to kill Hitler. The principal difficulty for any would-be Hitler assassin was getting near Hitler with a weapon or explosives. Henning von Tresckow, who came from the same regiment as von dem Bussche and was the head of the conspiracy alongside von Stauffenberg, suggested using a planned demonstration of the Army's new winter uniforms at the Wolfsschanze headquarters near Rastenburg because fellow Nazis and SS officers Göring and Himmler would also be present. Von dem Bussche volunteered and was chosen to explain the advantages of these new uniforms to those present. His appearance, standing over two meters tall, blond-haired and blue-eyed, exemplified Hitler's "Nordic" racial ideal, and he was therefore considered an ideal model. The plan was to arm and detonate a modified landmine hidden in his uniform. Von dem Bussche opted to use a hand grenade detonator to rig the device instead of the chemical detonator proposed by Stauffenberg because of the very long fuse time of the latter (ten minutes as compared to the 4 to 5 seconds fuse time of a hand grenade detonator) making it hard to accurately time the moment of explosion, as evidenced by the failure of Rudolf-Christoph von Gersdorff' assassination attempt eight months earlier. The disadvantage of the short fuse time was not having enough time to get away, both in terms of direct physical harm and the risk of detection and/or linking. Von dem Bussche planned to cover up the inevitable hissing of the detonator by clearing his own throat while embracing Hitler, thus killing himself along with Hitler.

In November 1943, von dem Bussche stood by for three days and two nights in the guest barracks at the East Prussian headquarters at the Wolfsschanze. On his arrival he handed co-conspirators Major i. G. Joachim Kuhn and Colonel Helmuth Stieff the documents given to him by von Stauffenberg for the implementation of the coup d'état. The night before the demonstration, however, the railway car containing the new uniforms was destroyed in an Allied air raid on Berlin. The assassination plot was never exposed, and von dem Bussche returned to his unit on the Eastern Front. After the failure of the assassination plan, Major Kuhn buried the incriminating evidence—both the documents and the explosives—on the premises of the Oberkommando des Heeres (OKH). These were recovered by Soviet officers on 17 February 1945, based on Kuhn's description of the hiding place, and in 1997 a copy was handed to German chancellor Helmut Kohl by Russian president Boris Yeltsin.

Von dem Bussche volunteered to attempt the assassination again in February 1944 when new uniforms would be available, and von Stauffenberg obtained marching orders for von dem Bussche from the Eastern Front to Berlin. On 30 January 1944, however, von dem Bussche was seriously wounded by Soviet shrapnel and his right leg was amputated. Another officer, Captain Ewald von Kleist, volunteered to carry out the mission at a viewing on 11 February 1944. However, Hitler repeatedly postponed and finally cancelled the event. As a result of his injuries, von dem Bussche spent several months in the Waffen-SS hospital Hohenlychen in Lychen (a privilege allotted to him as recipient of the gold German Cross). This hospitalization helped von dem Bussche escape discovery during the wave of persecution that followed the 20 July assassination attempt and he was never betrayed by any of the officers who knew of his involvement. He thereby became one of the few men in the Resistance to survive the war. Other survivors included Fabian von Schlabrendorff, Philipp Freiherr von Boeselager, Ewald-Heinrich von Kleist-Schmenzin, Joachim Kuhn and Rudolf-Christoph Freiherr von Gersdorff.

== After the war ==
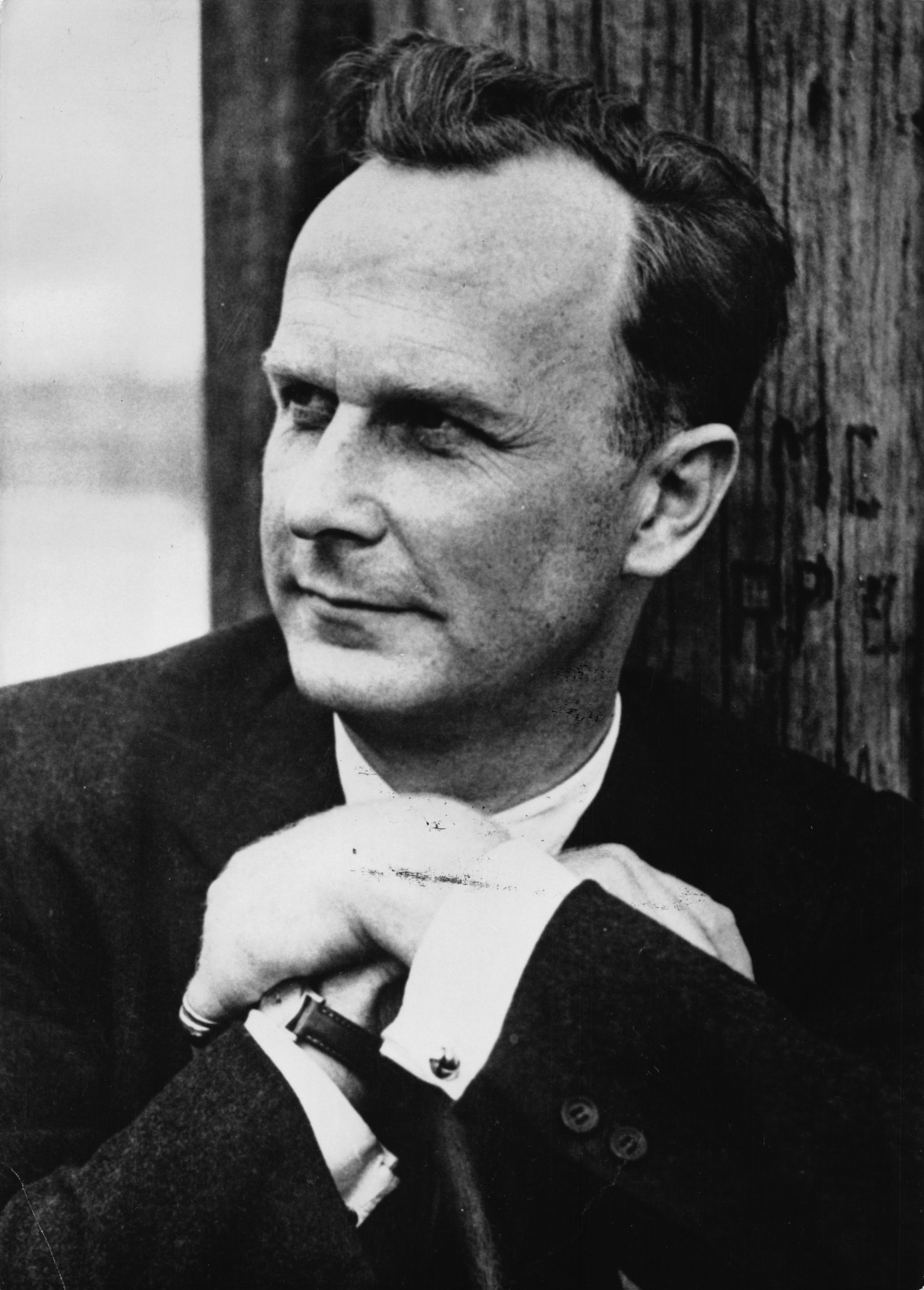
Axel von dem Bussche in August 1962

The von dem Bussche family owned manors in Thale, the former Wendhusen monastery, and Stecklenberg, however immediately after the Second World War, these properties were seized by the Soviet occupiers of what was to become communist East Germany. von dem Bussche went on to study law at the University of Göttingen and he became the first post-war chairman of the General Student Committee (Allgemeiner Studierendenausschuss) of the University of Göttingen. After completing his studies, he worked as a program assistant in the German department of BBC London. In 1948 he started work as an editor and consultant for advertising at Suhrkamp-Verlag.

In 1950 he married Englishwoman Lady Camilla Mildred Nicola Acheson (daughter of Archibald Acheson, 5th Earl of Gosford and Mildred Carter), divorced from Hans Christoph Schenk Freiherr von Stauffenberg. With her he had two daughters: Nicola Dietzsch-Doertenbach, née Freiin von dem Bussche-Streithorst, and Jane (Johanna) Freiin von dem Bussche-Streithorst. From Lady Camilla's first marriage to Schenk Freiherr von Stauffenberg, he has three step-sons: Sebastian, Patrick and Damian Schenk Freiherr von Stauffenberg.

In 1953 he took over management of the press office in the "Blank Office," which was the predecessor of the Federal Ministry of Defense of the Federal Republic of Germany dealing with the reparation of new German armed forces. He then moved to the Press and Information Office of the Federal Government, as an employee in the Commonwealth and USA department. From 1954 to 1958 he served as Legation Counselor at the German Embassy in Washington. From 1959 to 1962 he was head of the Salem Castle boarding school founded by Kurt Hahn, Karl Reinhardt and the Margrave of Baden.

After the founding of Deutscher Entwicklungsdienst, a German equivalent to the Peace Corps, he was appointed one of its two managing directors at the beginning of 1964; in this function he played a key role in building up the German development aid organization until 1966. Alongside and after that, from 1964 he was a member of the executive committee of the German Evangelical Church Congress, a member of the World Council of Churches, a consultant to the World Bank, an organizer of the first UN Conference on the Human Environment in 1972, and a one-year fellow at the College of Science in Berlin.

== 1991 attempt to recover expropriated property ==
In 1991 he was one of many unsuccessful plaintiffs who sued the federal government for return of the properties that had been expropriated in 1946 by the Soviet occupation forces. Von dem Bussche argued that the expropriation (de jure by the Soviet occupying powers, de facto by German communists) was unjust and, in his case, not even justified by Soviet standards, because according to Soviet provisions only "fascists" should be affected by expropriations. He argued that the government of the Federal Republic, which after 1990 became the owner of his former property in Thale, should make up for the injustice by returning the property to him as the rightful owner. The Federal Constitutional Court ruled that the expropriation and expulsion occurred before the Federal Republic of Germany was founded in 1949. Accordingly, the Federal Government was not to be held responsible for the consequences of the war that occurred before it was founded. Von dem Bussche found the court's reasoning scandalous, stating, "wrong cannot become right." As a result of this legal matter, von dem Bussche had at times fallen out with his former resistance regiment colleague and Federal President, Richard von Weizsäcker, with whom he had been a close friends for decades. After von dem Bussche's death on 26 January 1993 in Bad Godesberg, and burial in the family crypt of the Dietzsch-Doertenbach family in Lehrensteinsfeld, his eldest daughter Nicola Dietzsch-Doertenbach bought back larger parts of the former family property from the Federal Republic of Germany.

== Awards and decorations ==
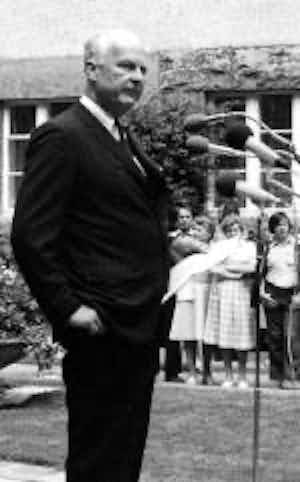
Commemorative address on 20 July 1970 at the Memorial to the German Resistance

- Iron Cross of 1939, 1st and 2nd class
- German Cross in Gold on 15 December 1941 as Oberleutnant in the 11./Infanterie-Regiment 9
- Knight's Cross of the Iron Cross on 7 March 1944 as Hauptmann and commander of the I./Grenadier-Regiment 9
- Wound Badge in Gold
- Knight of Honour of the Order of Saint John (Swiss Commandery)

== In the media ==
- Fragen an den 20. Juli heute. Gedenkansprache von Axel Freiherr von dem Bussche am 20. Juli 1977 im Ehrenhof der Gedenk- und Bildungsstätte Stauffenbergstraße, Berlin
- The Restless Conscience: Resistance to Hitler Within Germany 1933-1945 https://www.imdb.com/title/tt0102778/?ref_=ext_shr_lnk
- Der Judenmord 9/36 Das große Blutbad https://www.youtube.com/watch?v=dT1veKJeIfs
- Valkyrie: The Plot to Kill Hitler 08 "Aftermath" https://www.youtube.com/watch?v=I46ogt8UQuo
- Monument to Claus von Stauffenberg, Wolf's Lair, Kętrzyn, Warmian-Masurian, Poland, Europe https://www.youtube.com/watch?v=a4k-4QIfXDk

== See also ==
- Assassination attempts on Adolf Hitler
- Hermann Friedrich Graebe
