= Hermann Friedrich Graebe =

German manager and engineer (1900–1986)

Memorial sign at Yad Vashem commemorating Hermann Graebe being titled as one of the Righteous Among the Nations.

Herman Friedrich Graebe or Gräbe (19 June 1900 – 17 April 1986) was a German manager and engineer in charge of a German building firm in Ukraine, who witnessed mass executions of the Jews of Dubno on 5 October 1942 by Nazis and in the ghetto of Rivne on 13 July 1942. Following the war he wrote a famous and horrifying testimony.

Graebe gave the following eyewitness account:

My foreman and I went directly to the pits. Nobody bothered us. Now I heard rifle shots in quick succession from behind one of the earth mounds. The people who had got off the trucks - men, women and children of all ages - had to undress upon the order of an SS man who carried a riding or dog whip. They had to put down their clothes in fixed places, sorted according to shoes, top clothing and undergarments. I saw heaps of shoes of about 800 to 1000 pairs, great piles of under-linen and clothing. Without screaming or weeping these people undressed, stood around in family groups, kissed each other, said farewells, and waited for a sign from another SS man, who stood near the pit, also with a whip in his hand. During the fifteen minutes I stood near, I heard no complaint or plea for mercy. I watched a family of about eight persons, a man and a woman both of about fifty, with their children of about twenty to twenty-four, and two grown-up daughters about twenty-eight or twenty-nine. An old woman with snow white hair was holding a one-year-old child in her arms and singing to it and tickling it. The child was cooing with delight. The parents were looking on with tears in their eyes. The father was holding the hand of a boy about ten years old and speaking to him softly; the boy was fighting his tears. The father pointed to the sky, stroked his head and seemed to explain something to him. At that moment the SS man at the pit started shouting something to his comrade. The latter counted off about twenty persons and instructed them to go behind the earth mound. Among them was the family I have just mentioned. I well remember a girl, slim with black hair, who, as she passed me, pointed to herself and said, "twenty-three years old." I walked around the mound and found myself confronted by a tremendous grave. People were closely wedged together and lying on top of each other so that only their heads were visible. Nearly all had blood running over their shoulders from their heads. Some of the people shot were still moving. Some were lifting their arms and turning their heads to show that they were still alive. The pit was nearly two-thirds full. I estimated that it already contained about a thousand people. I looked for the man who did the shooting. He was an SS man, who sat at the edge of the narrow end of the pit, his feet dangling into the pit. He had a tommy-gun on his knees and was smoking a cigarette. The people, completely naked, went down some steps which were cut in the clay wall of the pit and clambered over the heads of the people lying there to the place to which the SS man directed them. They lay down in front of the dead or wounded people; some caressed those who were still alive and spoke to them in a low voice. Then I heard a series of shots. I looked into the pit and saw that the bodies were twitching or the heads lying already motionless on top of the bodies that lay beneath them. Blood was running from their necks. The next batch was approaching already. They went down into the pit, lined themselves up against the previous victims and were shot.

He later provided vital testimony in the Einsatzgruppen Trial, one of the Subsequent Nuremberg Trials, invoking bitter persecution from many of his countrymen. To escape the hostility, Graebe moved his family to San Francisco in 1948, where he lived until his death in 1986. Hermann Graebe was honoured as a 'Righteous Among the Nations' by Yad Vashem. Another witness of the mass executions of October 1942 in Dubno was the German officer Axel von dem Bussche who, traumatised by what he had seen, in 1943 joined the German resistance around Claus von Stauffenberg and unsuccessfully tried to kill Adolf Hitler in a suicide attack in November 1943.
