= Alice Stanley, Countess of Derby =

British noblewoman (1862–1957)

Alice Montagu
- Countess of Derby
- Born: 15 August 1862; Westminster
- Died: 23 July 1957 (aged 94); Coworth Park
- Spouse: Edward Stanley, 17th Earl of Derby (m. 1889; died 1948)
- Issue: Edward Stanley, Lord Stanley; Hon. Oliver Stanley; Lady Victoria Bullock
- Father: William Montagu, 7th Duke of Manchester
- Mother: Luise Fredericke Auguste, Countess von Alten

Alice Maud Olivia Stanley, Countess of Derby (née Montagu; 15 August 1862, Westminster – 23 July 1957, Coworth Park) was born the daughter of the 7th Duke of Manchester and his wife, Countess Louise von Alten.

== Early life and family ==
Lady Alice Maud Olivia Montagu was born on 15 August 1862, the youngest daughter of William Montagu, 7th Duke of Manchester, and his wife, Louisa von Alten. Her mother was a prominent Victorian and Edwardian society hostess later known as the "Double Duchess" following her second marriage to Spencer Cavendish, 8th Duke of Devonshire.

On 5 January 1889, Lady Alice married Edward Stanley, 17th Earl of Derby (then known as Lord Stanley), son of Frederick Stanley, 16th Earl of Derby, at St Margaret's, Westminster. Following her husband's accession to the earldom in 1908, she became Countess of Derby and chatelaine of Knowsley Hall in Lancashire.

The couple had three children, all of whom predeceased her:

- Lady Victoria Alice Louise Stanley (1892–1927), who married the Hon. Neil Primrose, MP, and secondly Sir Malcolm Bullock. She died aged 35 following a horse riding accident while hunting in Gloucestershire.
- Edward Stanley, Lord Stanley (1894–1938), Conservative politician and MP for Fylde, who served as Secretary of State for Dominion Affairs.
- The Rt Hon. Oliver Frederick George Stanley (1896–1950), Conservative Cabinet Minister who served as Secretary of State for the Colonies.

Lady Alice died on 23 July 1957 at the age of 94, outliving her husband by nine years.

== Court duties and public life ==
Following her marriage, Lady Alice became an active public figure nationally and in North West England. In late 1889, she accompanied her father-in-law, Lord Stanley of Preston (then Governor General of Canada), on an official tour across Western Canada, during which local reports noted her taking early photographs from the rear platform of the Canadian Pacific Railway train.

In November 1901, Lady Alice was appointed extra Lady of the Bedchamber to Queen Alexandra, serving as a full Lady of the Bedchamber from 1910 until Queen Alexandra's death in 1925.

Lady Alice frequently performed official maritime launch ceremonies, including:

- Naming the pre-dreadnought battleship HMS Exmouth at Cammell Laird, Birkenhead, in August 1901.
- Launching the Cunard Line ocean liner RMS Aquitania at John Brown & Co. in Clydebank on 21 April 1913.

During the First World War, she actively supported the British Red Cross Society in Lancashire, assisting Voluntary Aid Detachment hospitals and organizing local relief work.
