= Henry Herman Harjes =

French-born American polo player and banker

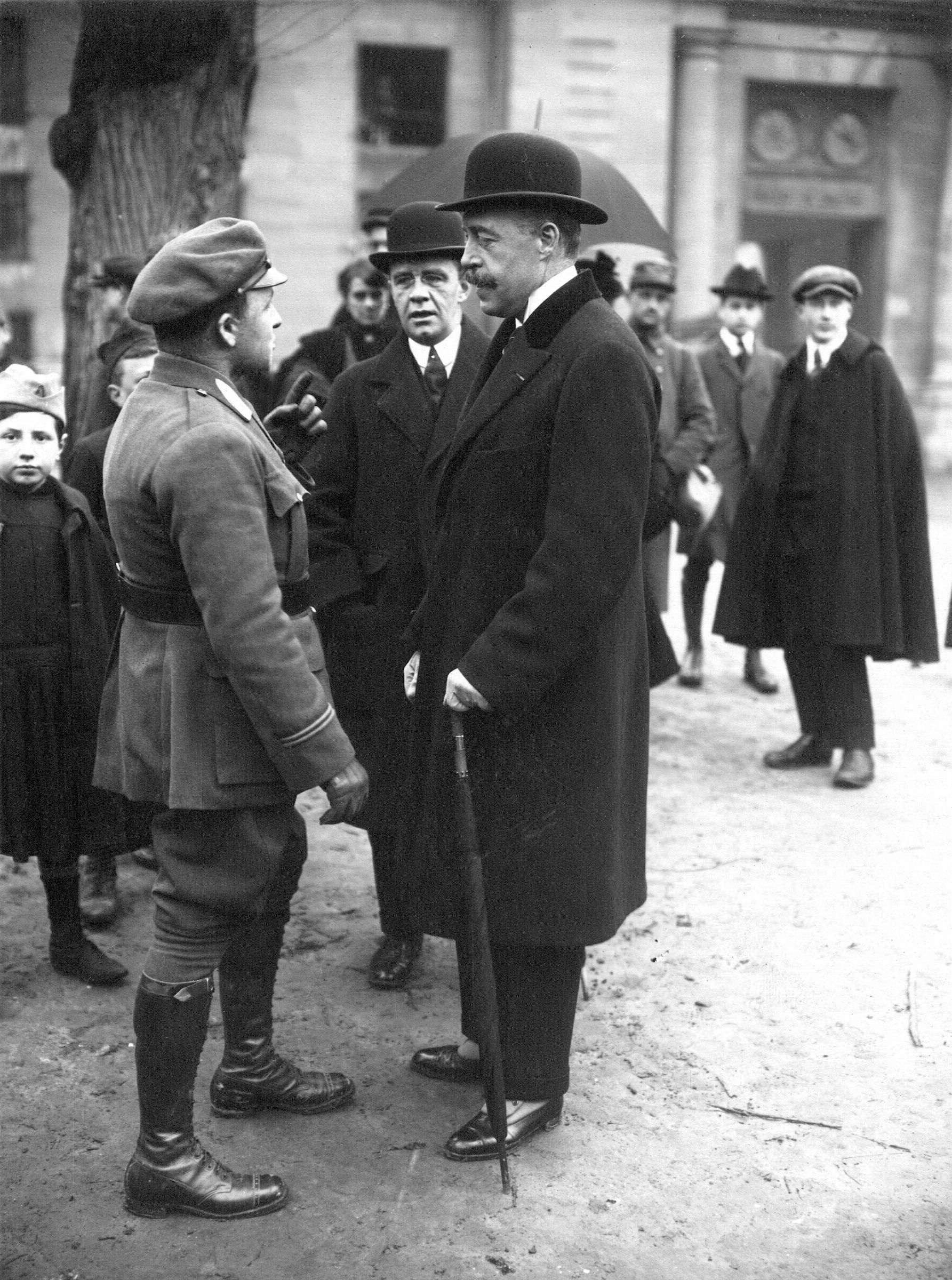
- Paris 1917: H. H. Harjes donates 40 ambulances to Serbia through the American Red Cross and the government of France
- Born: 20 February 1875; Paris, France
- Died: 20 August 1926 (aged 51); Deauville, France
- Occupation: Banker
- Employer: Morgan, Harjes & Co.
- Spouses: Marie Robertina Graves (m. 1897; died 1905) Frederica Vesta Berwind Gilpin (m. 1911)
- Children: 5
- Parent(s): John Henry Harjes; Amelia Hessenbruch Harjes
- Awards: Croix de Guerre

Henry Herman Harjes (20 February 1875 – 20 August 1926) was a French born American polo player and banker with Morgan, Harjes & Co.

== Early life ==
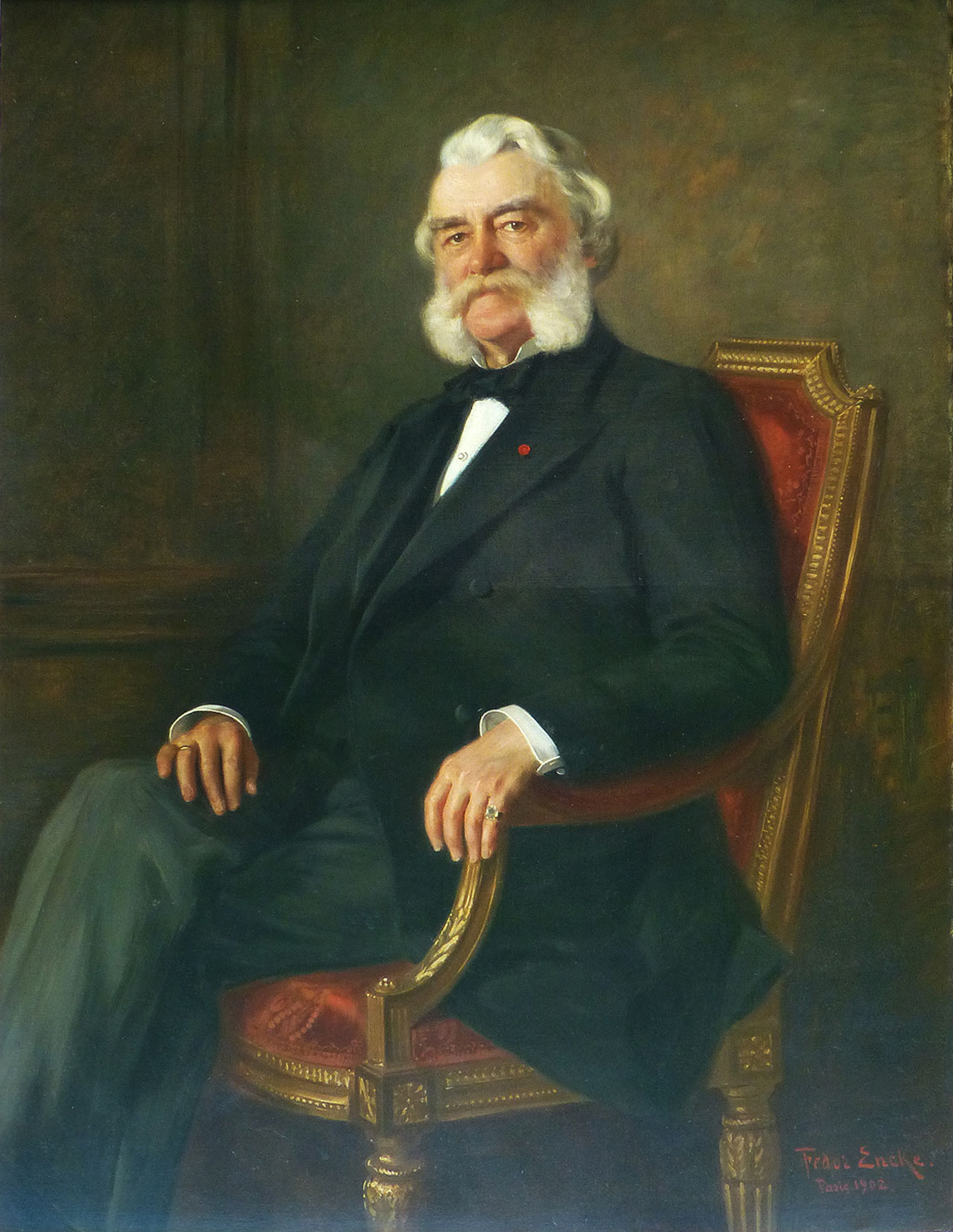
Portrait of his father, John H. Harjes, by Fedor Encke, 1903

Harjes was born on 20 February 1875 in Paris, France. He was a son of John Henry Harjes (1829–1914) and Amelia (née Hessenbruch) Harjes (1841–1934). Among his siblings was Louise Rosalie Harjes (wife of Charles Messenger Moore), Amelia Mae Harjes, John Henry Harjes Jr., Margaretha "Nelly" Harjes (wife of jeweler Jacques Cartier).

His maternal grandparents were Theophilus Hessenbruch and Bertha (née Everts) Hessenbruch.

He was educated by private tutors in England and America before beginning his career as a clerk in the office of J.P. Morgan & Co. in 1896.

== Career ==
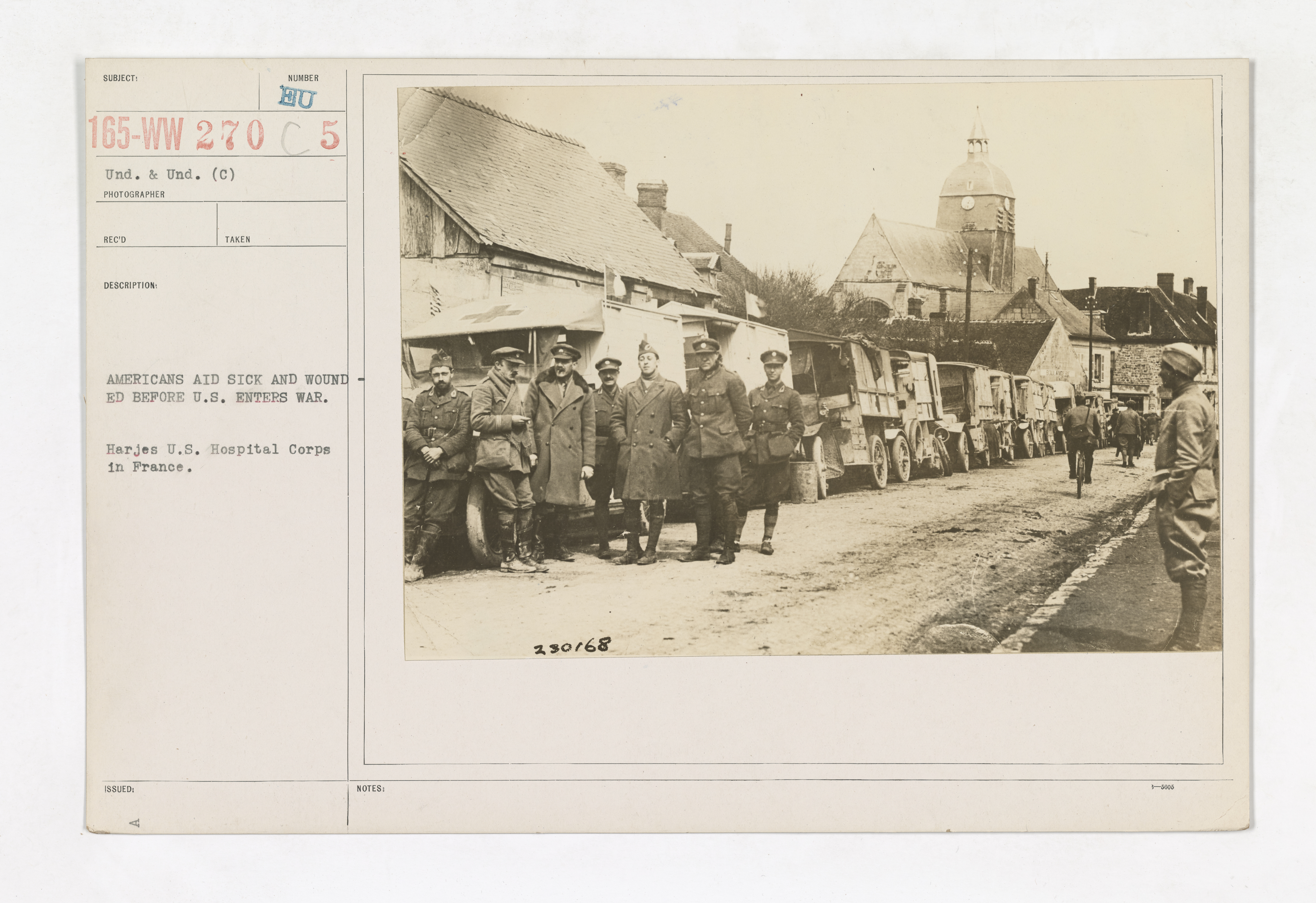
Photograph of the Harjes Hospital Corps in France, c. 1917–1918

Harjes was a prominent banker who became the senior partner of Morgan, Harjes & Co. of Paris, which was founded as Drexel, Harjes & Co. by his father John Harjes in 1868, after he moved to Paris from Philadelphia in 1854. Harjes and his father, who was born in Switzerland but later became an American citizen, were among the founders in 1906 of the American Hospital of Paris. The younger Harjes inherited management of the firm in 1909, following his father's retirement. Upon his father's death in 1914, Harjes was one of three executors (along with his mother and Edward T. Stotesbury) of his father's multi-million dollar estate.

During World War I, he played a significant role behind the scenes by negotiating sizeable loans for the Allies. In time, the Morgan Bank system became the exclusive purchasing agents in the U.S. for the Allies. During the War, he served as head of the American Relief Clearing House which was responsible for channeling American contributions to France, and from 1914 to 1917, he was the chief representative of the American Red Cross in France. He founded the Harjes Formation, a volunteer ambulance driver group, which merged with Richard Norton's American Volunteer Motor Ambulance Corps to become known as the Norton-Harjes.

When relief efforts were militarized in July 1917, Harjes stepped down, enlisted with the Americans as a Lieutenant colonel and served as chief liaison officer for the American Expeditionary Forces with the French High Command. He was wounded in action in August 1918. For his efforts during the War, France awarded him the Croix de Guerre, and the United States and other allied countries conferred decorations on the Colonel.

=== Polo career ===
Reportedly, Harjes introduced polo to France. Suffering from a stiff leg as a result of a war injury, Harjes decided to stop playing polo altogether, but was killed in a polo accident in 1926, during his last game that was to conclude his polo career. At the time, he was playing with Lord Mountbatten and the Spanish Duke of Peneranda.

Among the principal polo players of his time, "the unanimous opinion was that Mr. Harjes' death was due to his refusal to spend money extravagantly on his ponies. Whereas such other players as Baron Robert de Rothschild, the Duke of Peneranda (Peñaranda) and M. Martinez de Hoz all kept eight ponies, for which they were willing to pay as high as $5,000 or $6,000 apiece, Mr. Harjes kept only five of mediocre quality."

== Personal life ==
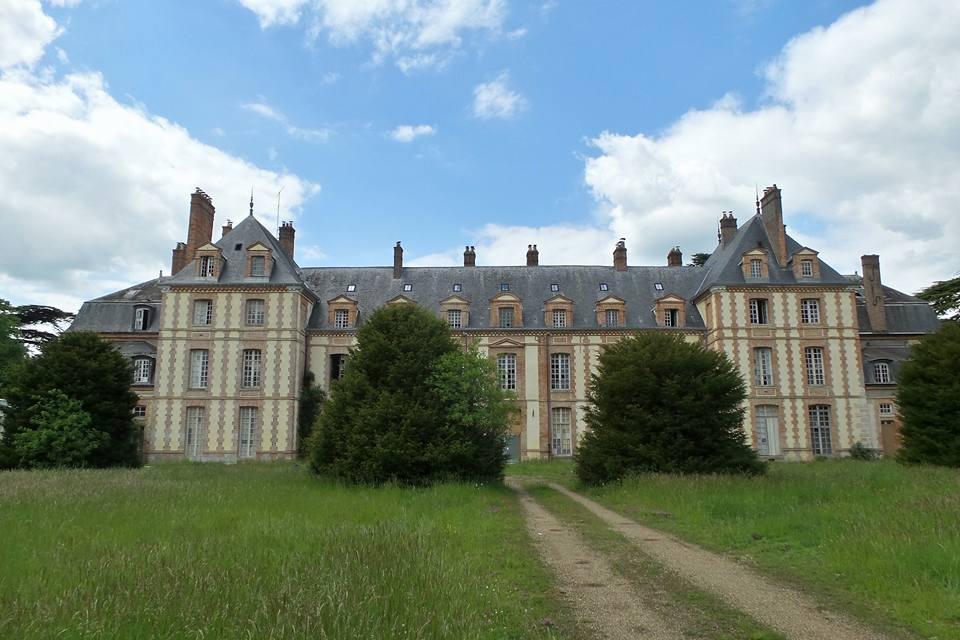
Château d'Abondant, the Harjes home near Paris.

On 20 October 1897, Harjes was married to heiress Marie Robertina Graves (1873–1905) at "My Fancy", the country home of Malcolm Webster Ford in Babylon on Long Island. Ford was married to Marie's sister, the former Janet Wilhelmina Graves. She was a daughter of Robert Graves and Cesarine (née Barbey) Graves. Together, they were the parents of two daughters:

- Hope Dorothy Harjes (1898–1923), who died in a riding accident.
- Cesarine Amelia Marie Harjes (1899–1949), who married banker Ralph Wormely Curtis (1908–1973), a son of Ralph Wormeley Curtis, in 1930.

After the death of his first wife in Carlsbad, New Mexico from tuberculosis in 1905, he remarried several years later to Frederica Vesta (née Berwind) Gilpin (1884–1954) on 20 February 1911 at the church in the Rue de Berri. Frederica, who was divorced from Charles Gilpin III in January 1911, was a daughter of Charles Frederick Berwind (brother of Edward Julius Berwind and Julia Berwind) and Anita (née Hickman) Berwind. Two of her sisters Edith, Baroness von Kleist, and Fanny, Countess von Montgelas, married into the German aristocracy. Together, Frederica and Henry lived at 49 rue de la Faisanderie in Paris (which won the Concours de façades de la ville de Paris in 1905 and was designed by Danish architect Hans-Georg Tersling) were the parents of:

- Charles Berwind Harjes (1904–1952), who married Elizabeth Schuster (1913–1980) in 1935.
- Henry Herman Harjes Jr. (1912–1994), who married Joan Blake (1916–1983), a granddaughter of William Phipps Blake and half-sister of Mrs. Irving Berlin, in 1934. They divorced in 1947, and he married Tauni de Lesseps (1915–2001), a granddaughter of Ferdinand de Lesseps, in 1947.
- John Frederick Harjes (1914–1972), a Cambridge University graduate who married, and divorced, twice.

In 1920, he acquired from the Duke de Vallombrosa the Château d'Abondant, a four story château set on 200 acres of landscaped grounds outside of Paris. The Château d'Abondant was designed by architect Jean Mansart de Jouy and was among a trio of châteaus located near Dreux, in the Eure-et-Loir department in northern France, including Château d'Anet and Château Saint-Georges Motel (owned by Consuelo Vanderbilt). near Paris. His son Henry sold the Château in 1937 to Baron Jules de Koenigswarter of Paris and his wife, the former Pannonica Rothschild.

Harjes died on 20 August 1926 in Deauville. An elaborate funeral officiated by The Reverend Frederick W. Beekman at The American Cathedral of the Holy Trinity, of which Harjes had been a vestryman since 1903 and treasurer, was attended by J.P. Morgan, Dwight Morrow, Benjamin Strong, S. Parker Gilbert, General John J. Pershing and John Grier Hibben. He was buried at Versailles. He left his entire estate to his wife and three children, with his wife and John Ridgeley Carter as co-executors. The American Cathedral vestry honored him as the longest-serving vestry member and remarked: "He made America to be honored in France."

Ten years after his death, his wife remarried to Seton Porter (in 1936), and lived at 834 Fifth Avenue in New York City. She died in Newport, Rhode Island in June 1954.
