= Archibald Acheson, 5th Earl of Gosford =

British peer (1877–1954)

The Right Honourable The Earl of Gosford MC KStJ

Personal details
- Born: Archibald Charles Montagu Brabazon Acheson; 26 May 1877 London, England
- Died: 20 March 1954 (aged 76) New York City, United States
- Spouses: Mildred Carter (m. 1910; div. 1928); Beatrice Claflin (m. 1928)
- Children: 5, including Archibald Alexander John Stanley Acheson
- Parents: Archibald Acheson, 4th Earl of Gosford (father); Lady Louisa Montagu (mother)

Military service
- Allegiance: United Kingdom
- Branch/service: British Army
- Rank: Lieutenant colonel
- Unit: Coldstream Guards
- Battles/wars: Second Boer War; First World War
- Awards: Military Cross

Archibald Charles Montagu Brabazon Acheson, 5th Earl of Gosford, MC, KStJ (26 May 1877 – 20 March 1954), styled Viscount Acheson until 1922, was a British peer and army officer.

== Early life ==
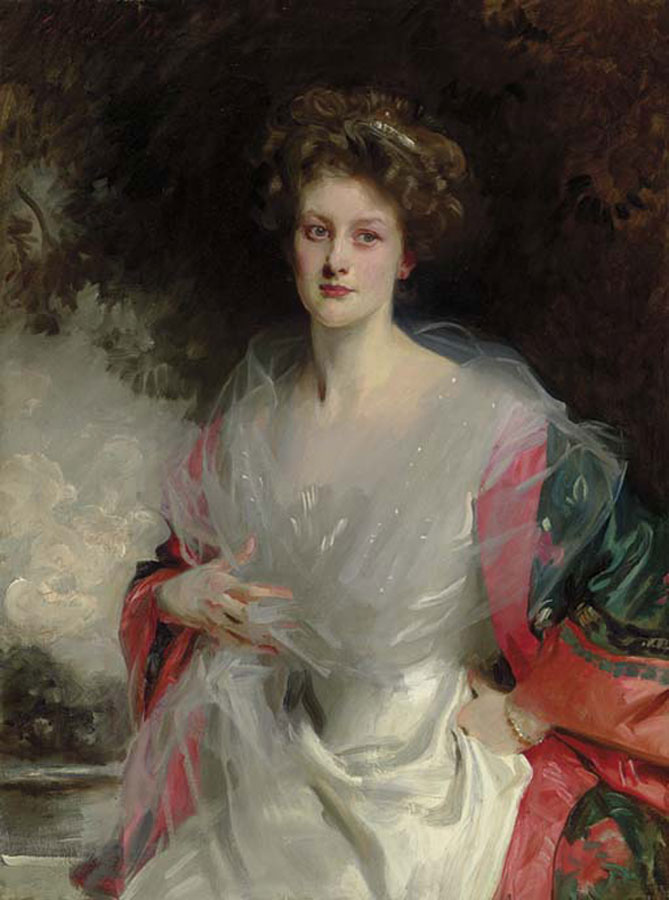
His first wife, Mildred Carter, John Singer Sargent, 1908

Acheson was born in London on 26 May 1877. He was the eldest son of Archibald Acheson, 4th Earl of Gosford and Lady Louisa Montagu (1854–1944), a Lady-in-Waiting to Queen Alexandra.

His paternal grandparents were Archibald Acheson, 3rd Earl of Gosford and the former Lady Theodosia Brabazon (only daughter of John Brabazon, 10th Earl of Meath). His maternal grandparents were William Montagu, 7th Duke of Manchester and the former Countess Louisa von Alten (a daughter of Karl Franz Viktor, Count of Alten). After his grandfather's death in 1890, his grandmother remarried to Spencer Cavendish, 8th Duke of Devonshire.

== Career ==
Lord Acheson was commissioned in the Coldstream Guards as a second lieutenant on 4 May 1898, and promoted to lieutenant on 17 August 1899. He served in the Second Boer War from 1899 to 1900, where he was part of the force sent to relieve Kimberley, during which he was wounded in the Battle of Modder River (November 1899). From 31 March 1900 he served in a staff appointment as aide-de-camp to Sir George Pretyman, who became Military Governor at Bloemfontein later that year, and in December 1901 he was back with his regiment. After the end of the war in South Africa, Lord Acheson resigned from the Army in late October 1902. He was appointed a lieutenant in the Reserve of Officers on 3 January 1903, and re-enlisted in the First World War as a lieutenant-colonel in the Coldstream Guards. He was awarded the Order of Saint John and a Military Cross in the King's 1915 Birthday Honours. In 1918, he served as Assistant Adjutant-General of the War Office.

Upon the death of his father in 1922, Lord Gosford succeeded to the earldom.

In America, where Lord Gosford lived for twenty-five years, he set up a wine shop at 40 East 50 Street in Manhattan. During the Second World War, he joined the New York City Patrol, which assisted the New York City Police on night duty.

== Personal life ==
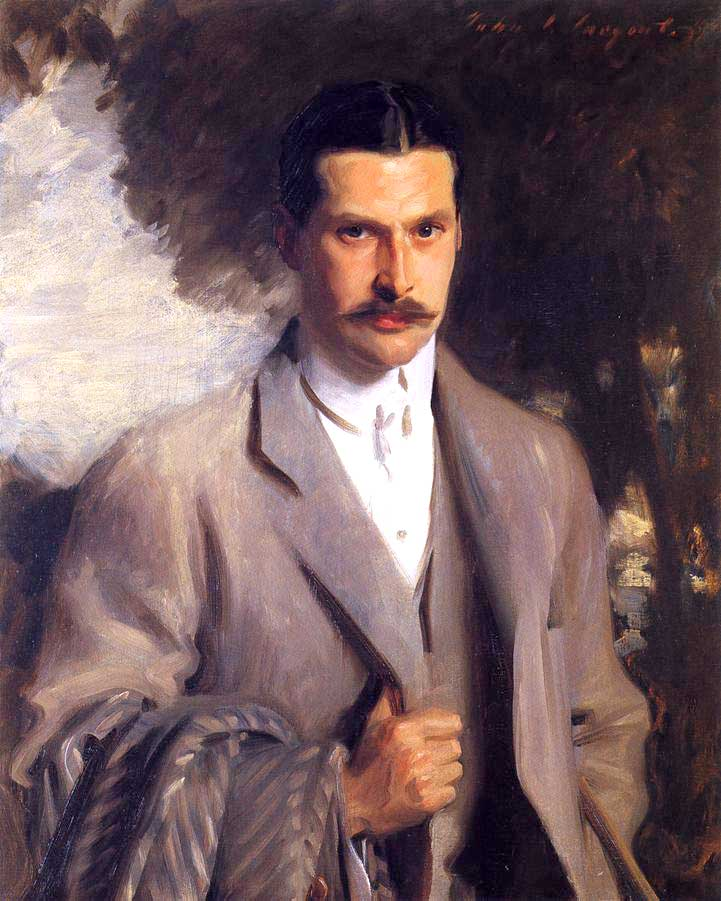
His father-in-law, John Ridgeley Carter, by John Singer Sargent, 1901

On 21 June 1910, then Viscount Acheson was married to Mildred Caroline Carter (1888–1965) at St George's Hanover Square Church. Mildred, as she was known, was the only daughter of American diplomat John Ridgeley Carter (a descendant of Henry Lee III, the 9th Governor of Virginia) and Alice (née Morgan) Carter (sister of William Fellowes Morgan). Together, they were the parents of the following children:

- Archibald Alexander John Stanley Acheson, 6th Earl of Gosford (1911–1966), who married Francesca Cagiati, eldest daughter of Francesco Cagiati. They divorced in 1960 and he remarried to Cynthia Margaret Delius, the widow of Maj. James Pringle Delius and daughter of Capt. Henry Cave West MC.
- Lady Patricia Acheson (1913–1913), who died in infancy.
- Hon. Patrick Bernard Victor Montagu Acheson (1915–2005), who married Judith Gillette, a daughter of Earle P. Gillette.
- Lady Mildred Camilla Nichola Acheson (1917–1965), who married Baron Hans Christoph Freiherr Schenk von Stauffenberg in 1937. She later married Axel Freiherr von dem Bussche-Streithorst in 1950.
- Lady Mary Virginia Shirley Acheson (1919–1996), who married Fernando Corcuera in Mexico in 1941.

In 1927, Lord Acheson left his first wife and went to New York City. They divorced in 1928 and while in New York, Lord Gosford married Beatrice (née Claflin) Breese on 1 October 1928. Beatrice, the former wife of Robert Potter Breese of New York, was a daughter of Arthur B. Claflin of 1050 Fifth Avenue in New York City and Southampton, New York, and a granddaughter of merchant Horace Brigham Claflin.

Lord Gosford died in the Flower and Fifth Avenue Hospital in New York City on 20 March 1954. He was buried at Maple Hill Cemetery in Shaftsbury, Vermont, near his summer home in South Shaftsbury. His first wife Mildred died at her home in Switzerland in September 1965, and his widow, the Dowager Countess of Gosford died on 26 January 1967.

=== Descendants ===
Through his daughter, Lady Mary, he was a grandfather of Jaime Corcuera Acheson (born 1955), who married Archduchess Myriam of Austria, a daughter of Archduke Felix of Austria and granddaughter of Kaiser Karl I of Austria, in 1983.

Peerage of Ireland
Preceded by Archibald Acheson	Earl of Gosford; 1922–1954	Succeeded by Archibald Acheson
