= Louisa Cavendish, Duchess of Devonshire =

German-born British aristocrat

Her Grace The Duchess of Devonshire
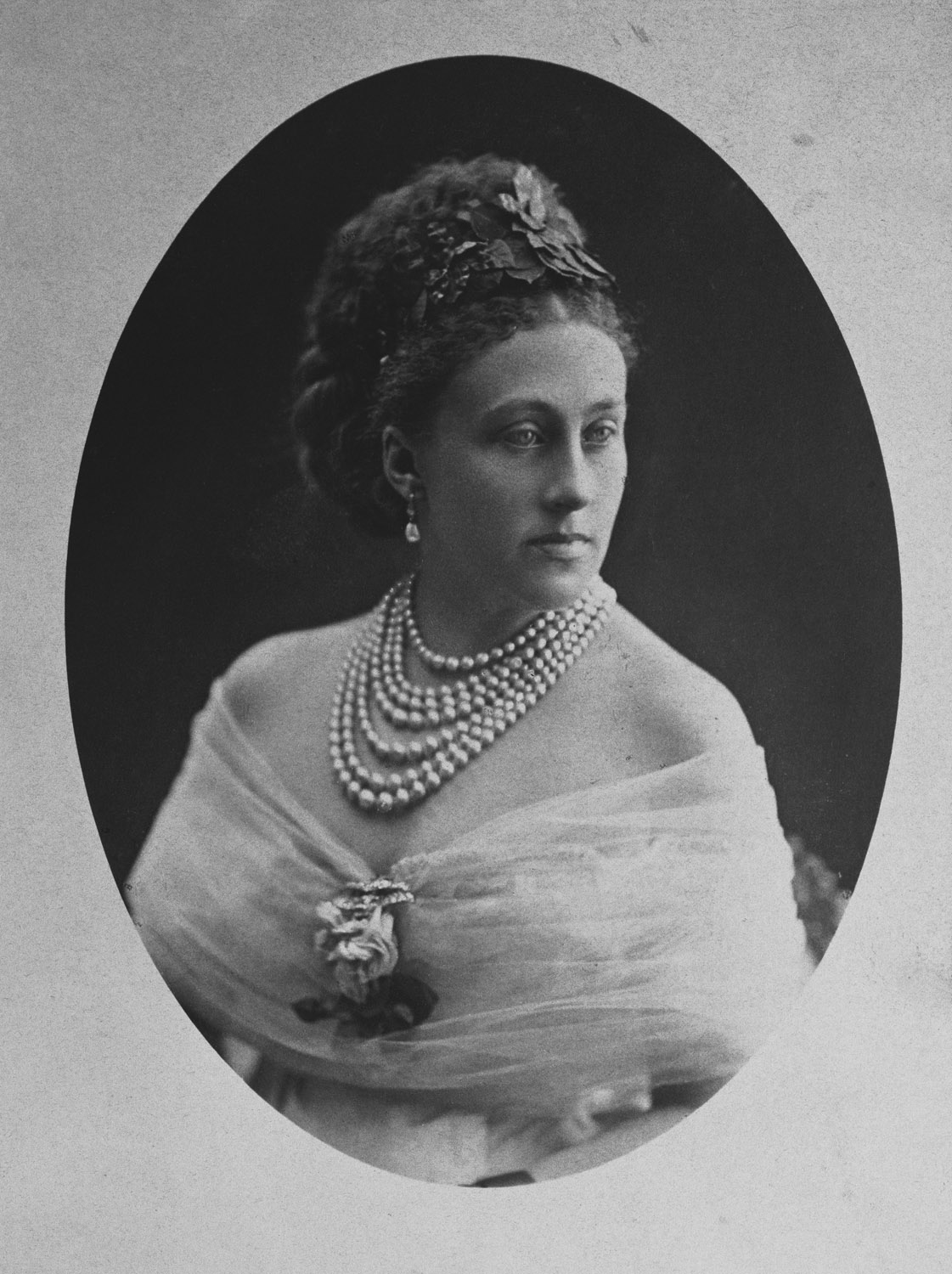
- Photographic portrait, 1884

Mistress of the Robes
- In office 24 February 1858 – 11 June 1859
- Monarch: Victoria
- Preceded by: The Duchess of Sutherland
- Succeeded by: The Duchess of Sutherland

Personal details
- Born: Countess Luise Friederike Auguste von Alten; 15 June 1832 Hanover, Kingdom of Hanover
- Died: 15 July 1911 (aged 79) Esher Park, Surrey, England
- Resting place: Edensor, Derbyshire, England
- Spouses: William Montagu, 7th Duke of Manchester (m. 1852; died 1890) Spencer Cavendish, 8th Duke of Devonshire (m. 1892; died 1908)
- Children: George Montagu, 8th Duke of Manchester; Mary Louise Montagu, Duchess of Hamilton; Louisa Acheson, Countess of Gosford; Lord Charles Montagu; Alice Stanley, Countess of Derby
- Parent(s): Karl Franz Viktor, Count von Alten (father); Hermine von Schminke (mother)

Louisa Cavendish, Duchess of Devonshire (born Countess Luise Friederike Auguste von Alten; formerly Louisa Montagu, Duchess of Manchester; 15 June 1832 – 15 July 1911) was a German-born British peeress sometimes referred to as the "Double Duchess" due to her marriages to the 7th Duke of Manchester and then to the 8th Duke of Devonshire.

== Early life ==
Luise Friederike Auguste, Countess von Alten, was born 15 June 1832 at Hanover in what was then the Kingdom of Hanover into a family of German nobility. She was a daughter of Karl Franz Viktor, Count von Alten (1800–1879), and his wife, Hermine von Schmincke (1806–1868), the daughter of Friedrich Christoph von Schmincke, who served as the government minister in the Electorate of Hesse. Her siblings included: Helene Charlotte Auguste, Countess of Alten, who married Andrei Bludov, Carl Friedrich Franz Victor, Count of Alten, who married Carolina Frederica Groeninx van Zoelen, and Guidobaldine, Countess of Alten, who married Graf August Grote and Don Luigi Maria Colonna, Prince of Stigliano, and Detlof von Bülow.

Her paternal grandparents were Adolf Viktor Christian Jobst, Count von Alten (1755–1820), and Charlotte Louise Wilhelmine Kinsky von Wchinitz und Tettau.

== Mistress of the Robes ==
"A social climber with a nose for power", the 26-year-old Duchess (through her friendship with Lord Derby, the then prime minister) was appointed Mistress of the Robes to Queen Victoria in February 1858, resigning in June 1859, when Lord Derby's government fell. Victoria regretted her departure, calling her "a very pleasant, nice, sensible person". However, allegedly Victoria disapproved of 'her tone, her love of admiration and "fast style."' She pointedly declined to invite the Duchess to the wedding of Edward, Prince of Wales and Alexandra, Princess of Wales in 1863. The Duchess soon developed close friendships with both.

== Devonshire House Ball of 1897 ==
In July 1897, the Duchess hosted the Devonshire House Fancy Dress Ball at Devonshire House, the London residence of the Dukes of Devonshire during the 18th and 19th centuries. The party was a costume ball thrown to celebrate Queen Victoria's diamond jubilee. The Queen's Private Secretary, Francis Knollys, wrote to the Duchess that the Prince of Wales (who dressed as the Grand Master of the Knights of Malta) thought the party a success. The ball was considered the most important event of the London social season, and was spoken of for many years afterwards. At the ball, the Duchess dressed as Queen Zenobia of Palmyra.

== Marriages and issue ==
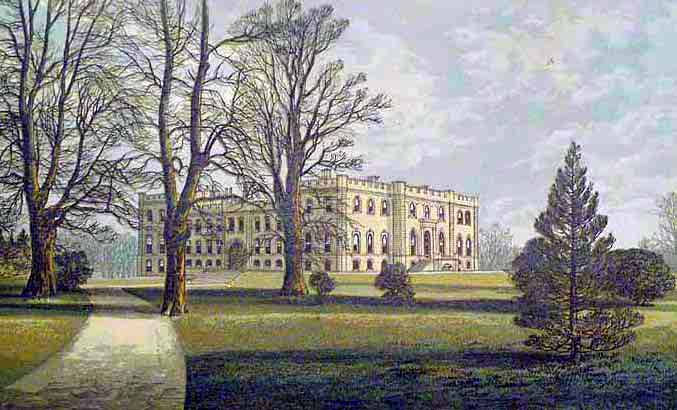
Illustration of Kimbolton Castle in 1880, which shows the present mansion as rebuilt between 1690 and 1720

On 22 July 1852, the twenty-year-old Louisa was married in Hanover to Viscount Mandeville, eldest son and heir of the 6th Duke of Manchester. Upon his father's death on 8 August 1855, he succeeded his father as 7th Duke of Manchester, and Louisa became Duchess of Manchester.

They had five children:

1. George Victor Drogo Montagu, 8th Duke of Manchester (1853–1892), who married Consuelo Yznaga (1853–1909), and had issue.
2. Lady Mary Louisa Elizabeth Montagu (1854–1934), who was born at Kimbolton Castle and married, firstly, to William Douglas-Hamilton, 12th Duke of Hamilton, at Kimbolton Castle on 10 December 1873, and had issue. She secondly married on 20 July 1897 to Robert Carnaby Forster of Easton Park, Wickham Market, Suffolk (d. 1925), without issue.
3. Lady Louisa Augusta Beatrice Montagu (1856–1944), born at Kimbolton Castle. She married Archibald Acheson, 4th Earl of Gosford, on 10 August 1876 in London, and had issue.
4. Lord Charles William Augustus Montagu (1860–1939), who married the Hon. Mildred Cecilia Harriet Sturt (1869–1942), daughter of Henry Sturt, 1st Baron Alington, at Kimbolton Castle on 4 December 1930. He had no issue.
5. Lady Alice Maude Olivia Montagu (1862–1957), born in London. She married Edward Stanley, 17th Earl of Derby, on 5 January 1889 in London, and had issue.

Louisa became estranged from the Duke, and they lived apart for many years. Louisa became the companion of Spencer Cavendish, Marquess of Hartington, and a notable political hostess. The Duke died in Naples on 22 March 1890.

On 16 August 1892, at Christ Church, Mayfair, the sixty-year-old Dowager Duchess of Manchester married Lord Hartington, by then the 8th Duke of Devonshire. She thereby became Duchess of Devonshire, with a nickname of the "Double Duchess".

With the Duke of Devonshire's death on 24 March 1908, she was widowed for the second time, becoming the Dowager Duchess of Devonshire. On 14 July 1911, she suffered a seizure at the Sandown Races. She was taken to nearby Esher Park, and died there on 15 July, aged 79; she was interred at Edensor, near Chatsworth, in Derbyshire.

== Gallery ==
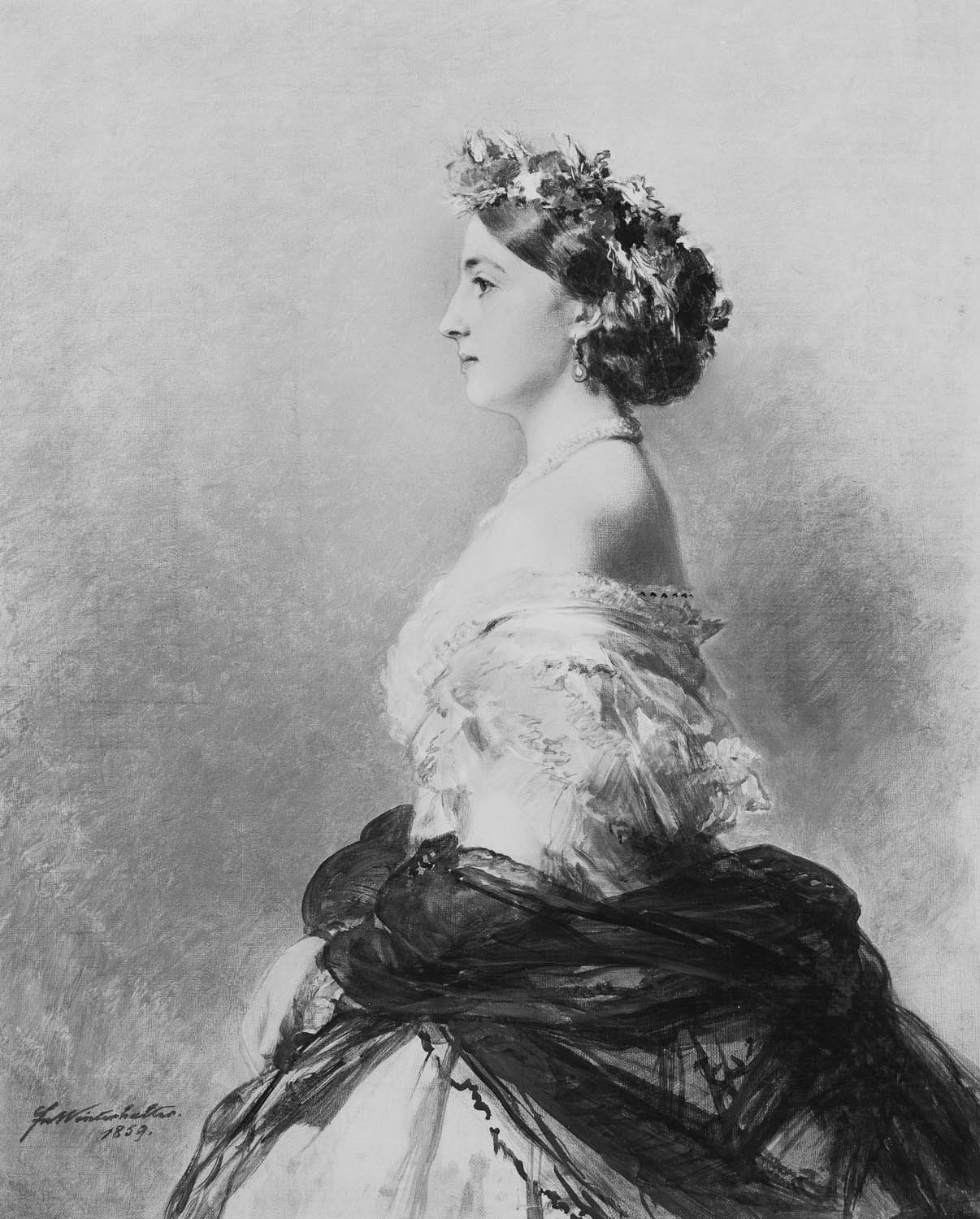
Painting of the then Duchess of Manchester, 1859

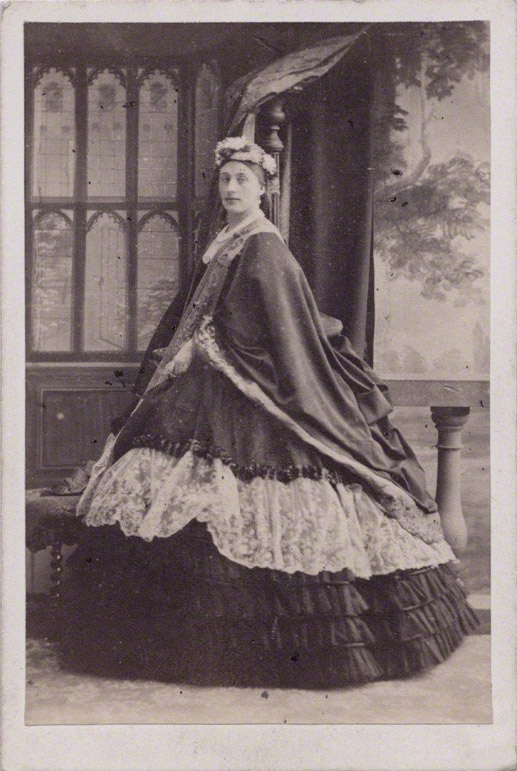
Photograph of the then Duchess of Manchester by Camille Silvy, 1860

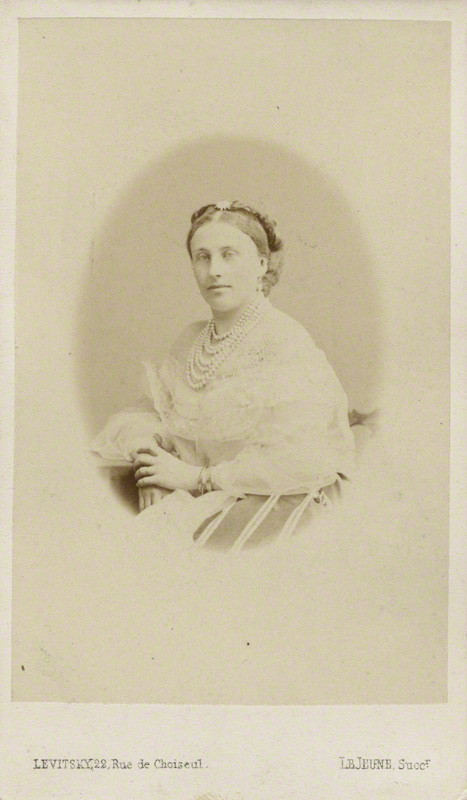
Photograph of the then Duchess of Manchester, Le Jeune, c. 1867

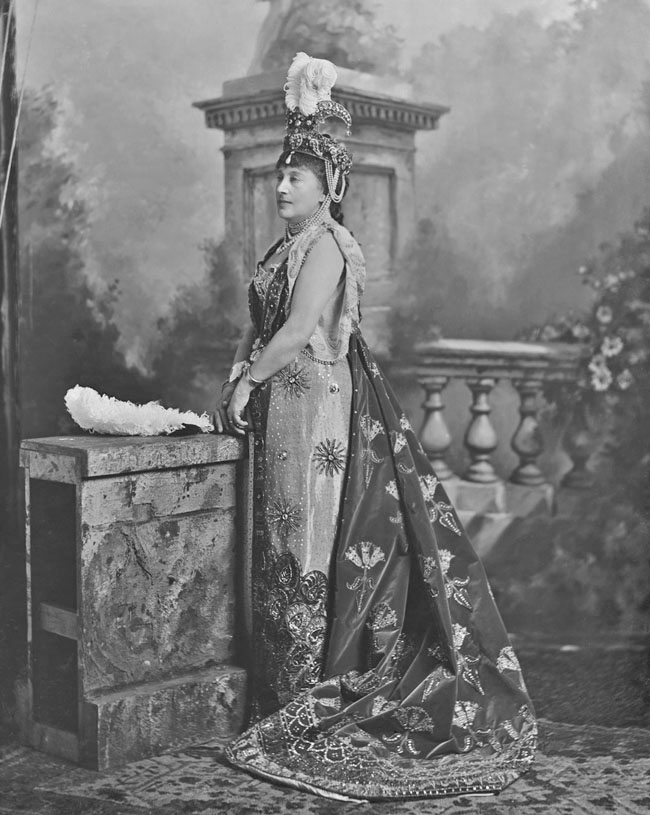
The Duchess of Devonshire as Zenobia, Queen of Palmyra, 1897

Court offices
Preceded by The Duchess of Sutherland	Mistress of the Robes to Queen Victoria; 1858–1859	Succeeded by The Duchess of Sutherland
