= John R. Carter (diplomat) =

American diplomat and banker (1864-1944)

John Ridgeley Carter
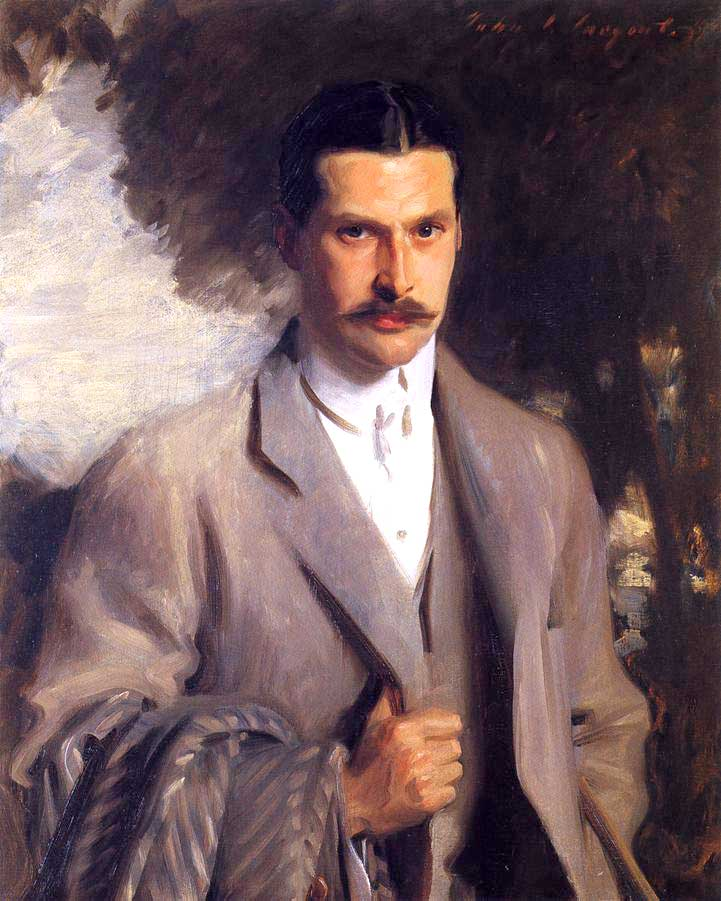
- Portrait of Carter by John Singer Sargent, 1901

United States Ambassador to Romania
- In office November 14, 1909 – October 24, 1911
- President: William Howard Taft
- Preceded by: Spencer F. Eddy
- Succeeded by: John Brinkerhoff Jackson

United States Ambassador to Serbia
- In office May 3, 1910 – October 27, 1911
- President: William Howard Taft
- Preceded by: Horace G. Knowles
- Succeeded by: John Brinkerhoff Jackson

Personal details
- Born: November 28, 1864 Baltimore, Maryland, U.S.
- Died: June 4, 1944 (aged 79) New York City, New York, United States
- Spouse: Alice Morgan (m. 1887; died 1933)
- Relations: Archibald Acheson, 6th Earl of Gosford (grandson)
- Children: Mildred, Countess of Gosford; Bernard Shirley Carter
- Education: Trinity College (MA); Maryland University; Harvard University; University of Leipzig

John Ridgeley Carter (November 28, 1864 – June 4, 1944) was an American attorney, diplomat, and banker.

== Early life ==
Carter was born on November 28, 1864, in Baltimore, Maryland. He was one of fourteen children born to Mary Buckner (née Ridgely) Carter and Bernard Carter, a prominent lawyer and professor.

Through his father, he was a member of the prominent Carter and Lee families of Virginia and was a descendant of Henry Lee III, the 9th Governor of Virginia. His paternal grandparents were Charles Henry Carter and Rosalie Eugenia (née Calvert) Carter (a daughter of George Calvert and Rosalie Stier Calvert), a descendant of George Calvert, 1st Baron Baltimore the first colonial proprietor of the Province of Maryland. His paternal aunt, Alice Carter, was married to Oden Bowie, 34th Governor of Maryland.

Carter received his undergraduate degree in 1883 from Trinity College in Hartford, followed by an M.A. degree there in 1885. After graduate work at the University of Leipzig, a law degree from Maryland University in 1887, and another from Harvard Law School in 1888, he was admitted to the Maryland bar in 1889.

== Career ==
In 1894, Carter accepted his first diplomatic appointment as secretary to Thomas F. Bayard, the U.S. Ambassador in London. He was made second secretary in 1896 and Chargé d'affaires in 1897. He served under Ambassadors John Hay, Joseph Hodges Choate until 1905, when he was appointed Secretary of the American Embassy in London under Ambassador Whitelaw Reid, remaining in that role until 1909.

On September 25, 1909, he was appointed as U.S. Minister at Bucharest, Romania. He presented his credentials on November 14, 1909, and served until October 24, 1911. While Minister to Romania, he concurrently served as the U.S. Minister to Serbia and Bulgaria (appointed as diplomatic agent on September 25, 1909, followed by U.S. Minister on June 24, 1910, although he never presented his credentials).

In 1911, he was offered the post of U.S. Minister to Argentina, but refused it because it came without a house to live in. Carter felt that without such accommodation, the post would be too expensive for him on his annual salary of $12,000. It was estimated that Charles H. Sherrill, the minister he was intended to replace (and under whom Robert Woods Bliss served as secretary of the legation in Buenos Aires), spent $100,000 yearly to maintain his position.

=== Later career ===
After Carter left the diplomatic service, he joined Morgan, Harjes & Co. in Paris in 1912, where he lived for twenty-five years, becoming a partner in 1914. With the firm, he traveled to Santiago, Chile to represent American stockholders of the Chilean-Argentine railway.4 Following the death of Henry Herman Harjes in 1926, he was the senior partner of the firm, which was renamed Morgan & Cie.

Due to his efforts during World War I, France made him a Grand Officer of the Légion d'honneur. After the German invasion of France in 1940, Carter returned to New York in October 1940, where they lived until his death in 1944.

== Personal life ==
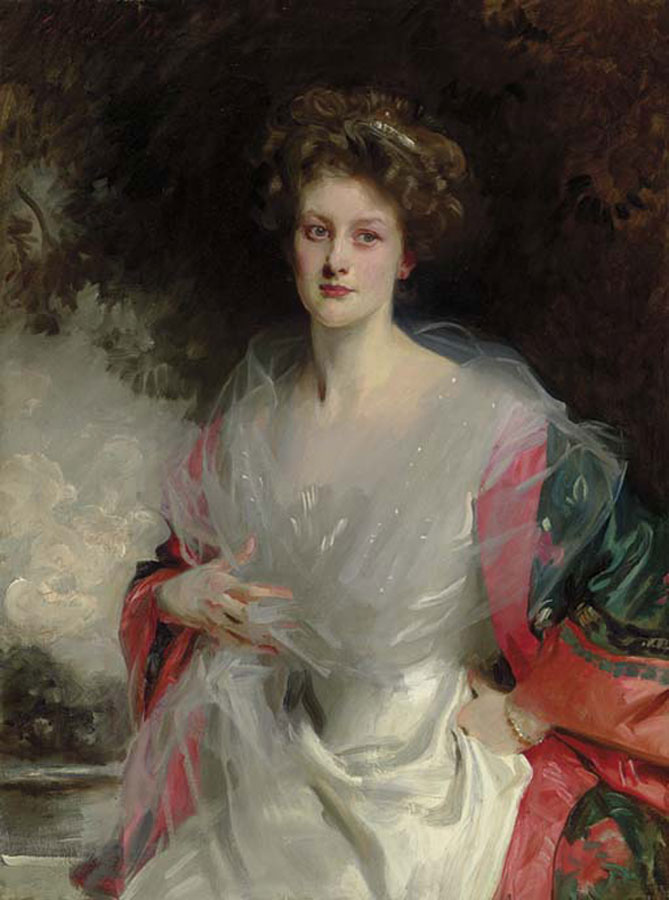
1908 portrait of his daughter, Mildred, later the Countess of Gosford.

In 1887, Carter was married to Alice Morgan (1865–1933) in Washington, D.C. Alice, one of seven children born to Carolyn (née Fellowes) Morgan and banker David Pierce Morgan, was the sister of William Fellowes Morgan Sr. Together, they were the parents of:

- Caroline Mildred Carter (1888–1965), who married Archibald, Viscount Acheson (later the 5th Earl of Gosford), in 1910.
- Bernard Shirley Carter (1893–1961), a prominent banker with Morgan, Harjes & Co. who married Louise Hope Thacher.

He was a member of both the Knickerbocker Club in New York and the Metropolitan Club in Washington, D.C.

His wife died at their home in Senlis, near Paris in 1933. Carter died on June 4, 1944, at the Knickerbocker Club, his residence in New York City. His funeral was held at St. Bartholomew's Church on Park Avenue.

=== Legacy ===
Carter was painted by prominent American artist John Singer Sargent in 1901. In May 1908, Sargent also painted a portrait of his daughter Mildred in London that was described at the time by The New York Times as "in the painter's best manner and brings out all of the innate sweetness of nature which has endeared Miss Carter to her English as much as to her American friends, all of whom agree that she has the wonderful tact and urbanity of her father." In 2007, the portrait of John R. Carter sold at Sotheby's for $1,833,000.

Diplomatic posts
Preceded by Spencer F. Eddy	United States Ambassador to Romania; 1909–1911	Succeeded by John Brinkerhoff Jackson
Preceded by Horace G. Knowles	United States Ambassador to Serbia; 1910–1911	Succeeded by John Brinkerhoff Jackson
