= Morgan, Harjes & Co. =

Morgan, Harjes & Co. (originally Drexel, Harjes & Co.) was a Paris-based investment bank founded in 1868 by John H. Harjes, Eugene Winthrop and Anthony J. Drexel as Drexel, Harjes & Co. In 1871, with the formation of Drexel, Morgan & Co., together with J. Pierpont Morgan, the company became the French affiliate of an international banking firm with offices in London, Philadelphia, New York City and Paris that would subsequently become J.P. Morgan & Co.

== History ==
=== Drexel, Harjes & Co. (1868-1895) ===
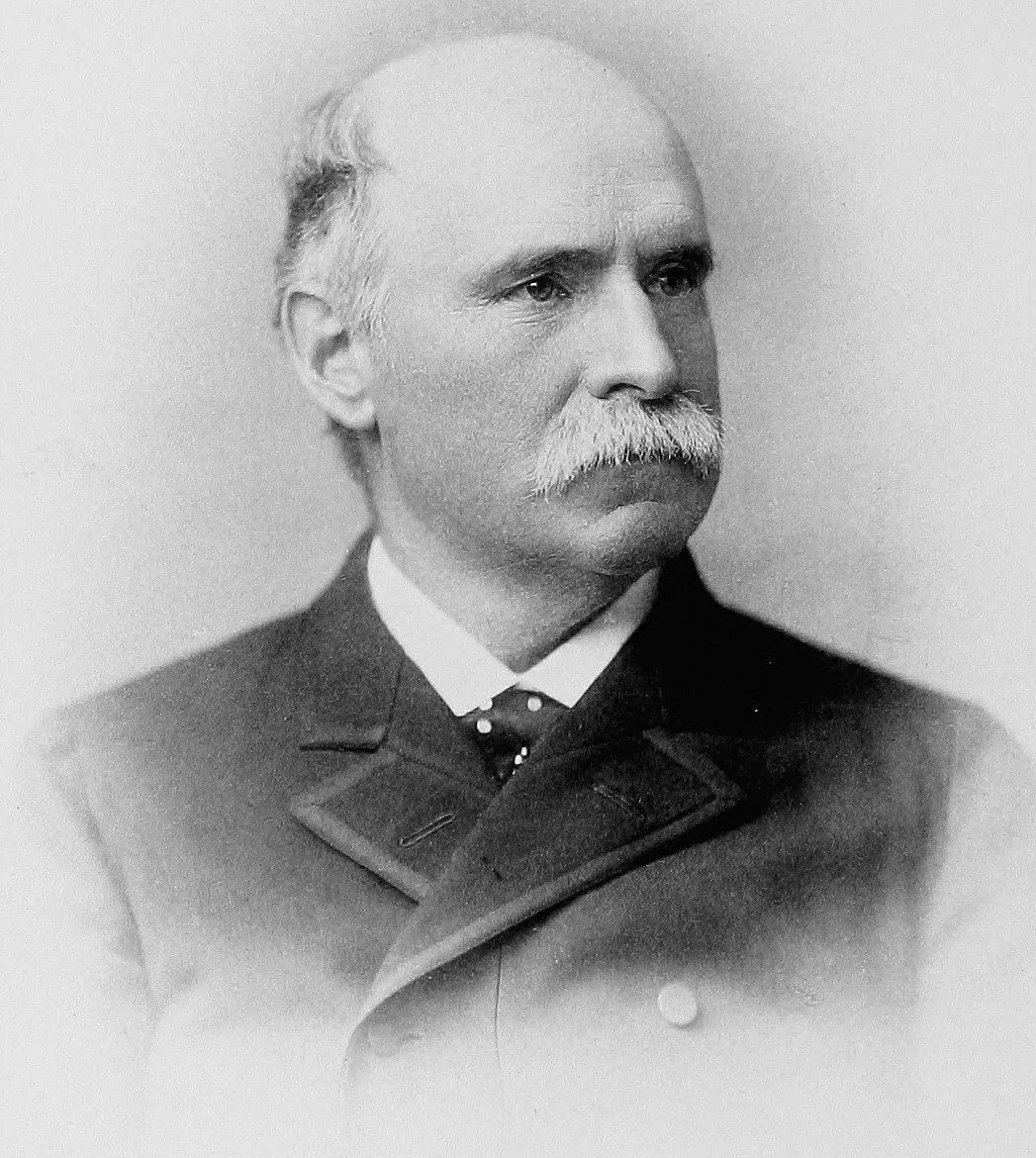
Anthony Joseph Drexel

Just three years after its formation, Drexel Harjes played a significant role in the aftermath of the Franco-Prussian War. Following the war, the firm was a major lender to the new French government as it repaid its massive war reparations.

Drexel Harjes supervised the transfer of the $50 million, which the United States paid to France to acquire its interests in the Panama Canal allowing the United States to begin work on the canal in 1904.

=== Morgan, Harjes & Co. (1895-1926) ===
In 1895, after Drexel's death, J. Pierpont Morgan assumed control of Drexel, Morgan & Co. and renamed the firm J.P. Morgan & Co. Similarly, Drexel, Harjes & Co. was renamed Morgan, Harjes & Co.

In 1909, John H. Harjes retired from Morgan Harjes and his son Henry Herman Harjes, who became a partner of the firm in 1898, took over responsibility for managing the firm.

Again in World War I, Morgan Harjes was actively involved, helping the Allied nations secure loans in order to purchase military supplies from manufacturers in the United States. Although critically important to the war effort, in the years following the war, Morgan Harjes was subjected to criticism for what were considered to be highly profitable war loans.

=== Morgan & Cie. (1926-1975) ===
In August 1926, Henry Herman Harjes died in a polo accident, ending the control of Morgan Harjes by the Harjes family. After Harjes' death, John Ridgeley Carter, a former American diplomat who became a partner in 1914, became senior partner of the firm. That fall, the firm was renamed Morgan & Cie.

During World War II, Morgan & Cie Incorporated was the only bank with ties to Allied nations that remained open during the occupation of Paris.

In 1967, Morgan Guaranty Trust (formerly J.P. Morgan & Co.), sold two-thirds of its ownership in Morgan & Cie Incorporated to Morgan Stanley to form Morgan et Compagnie International, which would serve as the foundation for Morgan Stanley's international operations. The joint venture between the two wings of the House of Morgan (J.P. Morgan & Co. and Morgan Stanley) was one of the few survivors of the Glass–Steagall Act.

In 1975, Morgan Stanley established Morgan Stanley International Incorporated in London, integrating its various international operations including Morgan et Compagnie International.
