= Archibald Acheson, 6th Earl of Gosford =

British peer, politician and Royal Air Force officer

The Right Honourable The Earl of Gosford OBE FRSA
- Lord & Lady Acheson in 1946

Lord-in-Waiting
- In office 1958–1959
- Preceded by: The Marquess of Lansdowne
- Succeeded by: The Lord St Oswald

Personal details
- Born: Archibald Alexander John Stanley Acheson; 14 January 1911
- Died: 17 February 1966 (aged 55) Camberley
- Party: Conservative
- Spouses: Francesca Cagiati (m. 1935; div. 1960); Cynthia Delius (m. 1960)
- Parents: Archibald Acheson, 5th Earl of Gosford (father); Mildred, Countess of Gosford (mother)
- Education: Harrow School
- Alma mater: Trinity College, Cambridge

Military service
- Allegiance: United Kingdom
- Branch/service: Royal Air Force
- Years of service: 1932–1946
- Rank: Group Captain
- Commands: No. 32 Wing RAF; No. 613 Squadron AAF
- Battles/wars: Second World War
- Awards: Officer of the Order of the British Empire; Bronze Star Medal (United States); Officer of the Legion of Honour (France)

Archibald Alexander John Stanley Acheson, 6th Earl of Gosford, OBE, FRSA (14 January 1911 – 17 February 1966), styled Viscount Acheson until 1954, was a British peer, politician, and a Royal Air Force officer.

== Early life ==
Archibald Acheson was the elder son of Archibald Acheson, 5th Earl of Gosford and Mildred, daughter of John Ridegely Carter of Baltimore, a banker and former United States Minister to Romania.

Acheson was educated at Harrow School, where he was Inter-Public Schools Athletics Champion for the 880 yards in 1929, and Trinity College, Cambridge, gaining a Master of Arts. At Cambridge he was a member of the Pitt Club, the Hawks' Club, the Alverstone Club and the Achilles Club.

== Career ==
Acheson was commissioned into the Royal Air Force in 1932 and served as Assistant Air Attaché at the British Embassy in Paris from 1938 to 1940. During the Second World War he commanded No. 613 Squadron AAF from 1941 to 1942 and later No. 32 Wing RAF. He was made an Officer of the Order of the British Empire in 1946, and was also awarded the United States Bronze Star Medal and made an Officer of the French Legion of Honour. From 1946 to 1948 he was Chief Instructor of the Cambridge University Air Squadron.

=== Political office ===
In 1954 Lord Acheson succeeded his father as Earl of Gosford, with a seat in the House of Lords as Baron Worlingham. He joined the Conservative government of Sir Anthony Eden as Parliamentary Secretary to the Ministry of Defence in 1956, before becoming Under-Secretary of State for Foreign Affairs in the succeeding government of Harold Macmillan in 1957. In 1958 he was made a Lord-in-waiting to the Queen, also serving as assistant to, and spokesman in the Lords for, the Minister of Transport and Civil Aviation Harold Watkinson. He held this post until 1959.

=== Civilian life ===
Lord Gosford was a Member of Council of the British Olympic Association in 1954. He was Foreign Affairs Adviser to Richard Thomas and Baldwins Ltd from 1960 to 1964, and from 1962 until his death was Chairman of the British Road Federation. He was also Chairman of the British Universities' Sports Federation, President of the Vocational Guidance Association, vice-president of the Royal Air Force Association and a member of White's, the St James's Club, the Royal Air Force Club, the Travellers' Club of Paris and the MCC.

== Personal life ==
On 13 December 1935, he was married to Francesca Cagiati, the eldest daughter of Francesco Cagiati of Boston, Massachusetts. Before their divorce in 1960, they were the parents of the following children:

- Lady Francesca Georgiana Caroline Acheson (1940–1991), who married David Wallace Fleming in 1967.
- Charles David Alexander John Sparrow Acheson, 7th Earl of Gosford (b. 1942), who married Lynette Redmond in 1983.
- Lady Isabella Augusta Acheson (b. 1950), who married Tevita T'Maka, of Nuku'alofa, Tonga in 1979.

On 21 September 1960, he married secondly to Cynthia Delius (1911–2015), the widow of Major James Pringle Delius, and a daughter of Captain Henry Cave West.

Lord Gosford died on 17 February 1966 and was succeeded in his titles and estates by his only son, Charles, who became the 7th Earl of Gosford.

Political offices
Preceded by The Marquess of Lansdowne	Lord-in-waiting; 1958–1959	Succeeded by The Lord St Oswald
Peerage of Ireland
Preceded by Archibald Acheson	Earl of Gosford; 1954–1966	Succeeded by Charles Acheson
