= William Fellowes Morgan Sr. =

American banker, businessman and politician

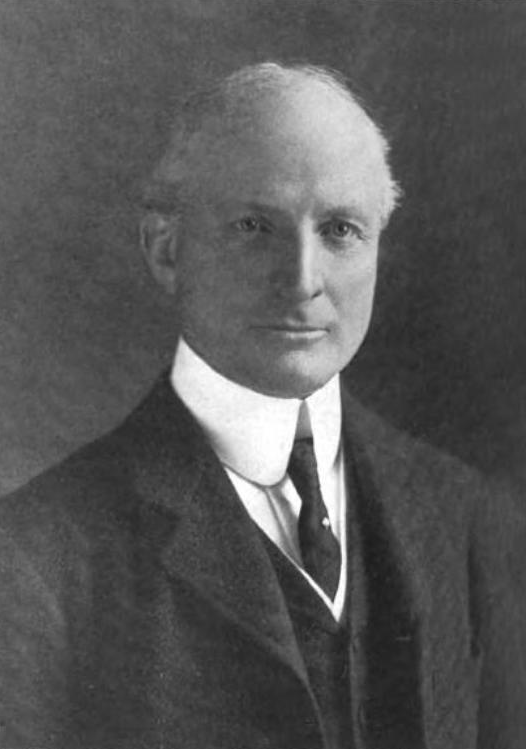

Member of the New Jersey General Assembly
- In office 1906–1908

Personal details
- Born: September 24, 1860 Clifton, Staten Island, New York, US
- Died: May 2, 1943 (aged 82) Manhattan, New York, US
- Party: Republican, Progressive
- Spouse: Emma Leavitt (m. 1885)
- Relations: Mildred, Countess of Gosford (niece)
- Children: 3, including William Jr.
- Parent(s): David Pierce Morgan; Caroline Fellowes Morgan
- Education: Columbia University; Columbia School of Mines
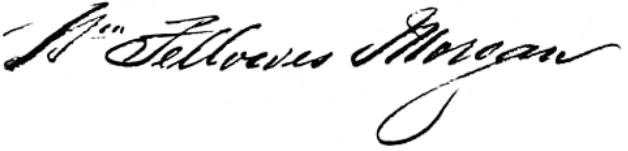
- Signature

William Fellowes Morgan Sr. (September 24, 1860 – May 2, 1943) was an American banker, businessman and politician. He served as president of the Brooklyn Bridge Freezing and Cold Storage Company, which he founded, and as secretary and treasurer of the United States Golf Association and president of the National Society for the Prevention of Blindness.

== Early life ==
Morgan was born in Clifton, Staten Island on September 24, 1860, and was named after his maternal grandfather. He was a son of "eminent banker" David Pierce Morgan (1831–1886) and Caroline (née Fellowes) Morgan (1832–1914). Among his siblings was Clara Hewitt Morgan, David Percy Morgan (treasurer of American Sugar Refining Company, brother-in-law of Herbert Parsons and son-in-law of John Edward Parsons), Alice Morgan (wife of diplomat John Ridgeley Carter and mother of Mildred, Countess of Gosford and Bernard Carter), and Lewis Henry Morgan. His parents moved to Paris in 1879 and lived there until 1883 before returning to the United States and living in Washington, D.C., until his death in 1886.

His paternal grandparents were Amos Morgan and Betsy (née Jennings) Morgan. Through his sister Alice, he was uncle to Mildred, Countess of Gosford, the wife of Archibald Acheson, 5th Earl of Gosford. His maternal grandparents were William Fellowes and Caroline (née Davis) Fellowes, who lived in Louisville, Kentucky, but moved north to Staten Island. His maternal uncle, Cornelius Fellowes, was the second husband of Caroline Suydam Whitney.

After completing preparatory studies at St. Paul's School in Concord, New Hampshire, he spent some time in England playing rugby. When he returned to the U.S., he attended Columbia University, where he was a member of the Philolexian Society. He graduated in 1880, and four years later graduated from the Columbia School of Mines. While at Columbia, he became friends with future governor of New York and President of the United States Theodore Roosevelt. In the election of 1883, when 24 year old Roosevelt was running for reelection to the New York Assembly, Roosevelt asked Morgan to supervise a polling place at 733 7th Avenue to prevent voter fraud. He called a "doubtful district."

== Career ==

After graduating from Columbia, he began working for the brokerage firm of Leavitt & Davis, where he remained until 1886 when he formed William Fellowes Morgan & Co., which dissolved two years later.

After leaving the brokerage business, Morgan became a pioneer in the use of refrigeration in warehouses which made him wealthy. In 1887, he founded the Brooklyn Bridge Freezing and Cold Storage Company, located at Arch No. 11 of the Brooklyn Bridge, and served as its president. He was a director of the Merchants Refrigeration Company, the Tri-State Land Company, the Chemical Bank and Trust Company, and the Citizens' Central National Bank of New York. He also served as president of the New York Merchants Association from 1915 to 1922.

For many years, he lived in Short Hills, New Jersey, where he was involved in civic affairs and served as chairman of the Township Committee and as president of the Board of Education. From 1906 to 1908, he served in the lower house of the New Jersey Assembly. In politics, Morgan was a Progressive, which was popularly nicknamed the "Bull Moose Party" per its leader Theodore Roosevelt.

=== Other work ===
From 1905 to 1919, he served as president of the Young Men's Christian Association of New York. He was also a veteran of the Seventh Regiment, N.Y.N.G. He was commissioned a major on the staff of General Ward of the First Brigade in 1884 and, thirteen years later, was with the brigade when it escorted the body of President Ulysses S. Grant to his tomb on Riverside Drive.

Morgan was a trustee of his alma mater, Columbia University, from 1910 to 1916, and a trustee of the American University of Beirut in Beirut, Lebanon, founded in 1866. From 1927 to 1939, he was chairman of the board of trustees of Wells College in Aurora, New York.

== Personal life ==
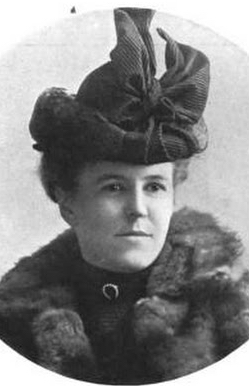
His wife Emma, from a 1901 publication.

On January 22, 1885, he was married to the tennis and golf player Emma Leavitt (1865–1956) at St. Thomas Church in New York. Emma was a daughter of Henry Sheldon Leavitt and Martha Ann (née Young) Leavitt. Together, they were the parents of three children:

- Beatrice Morgan (1886–1951), who married Frederic Pruyn, son of Robert C. Pruyn, in 1907. They divorced and in 1936, she married David Marvin Goodrich, chairman of the board of B. F. Goodrich Company and son of its founder, Benjamin Goodrich. At the time of their wedding, Goodrich had recently divorced his first wife, Ruth Pruyn, the sister of Beatrice's first husband.
- William Fellowes Morgan Jr. (1889–1977), the Commissioner of Public Markets for New York City. He married Mary Rathbone of Albany, New York. After her death in 1948, he married Enola Clark "Dodie" Stevens.
- Pauline "Polly" Morgan (1893–1971), who married Cleveland Earl Dodge, a son of Cleveland Hoadley Dodge, in 1919.

Morgan died on May 2, 1943, at 510 Park Avenue, his residence in Manhattan. After a funeral at St. George's Church in Stuyvesant Square, he was buried in Green-Wood Cemetery in Brooklyn. His widow died in December 1956.

=== Affiliations and interests ===
An avid golfer and tennis player, Morgan was secretary and treasurer of the United States Golf Association. He was also a president of the Senior United States Golf Association, Father and Son Golf Association and of the Garden City Golf Club. He was also a member of the Baltusrol Golf Club in New Jersey.

He was a member of the Union Club (where he served as governor), the Knickerbocker Club, the Racquet and Tennis Club, St. Anthony, City Club, the Jekyll Island Club, the Merchants Club as well as the Society of Colonial Wars and other social organizations.
