= William Fellowes Morgan Jr. =

American businessman (1889–1977)

William Fellowes Morgan Jr. in 1935

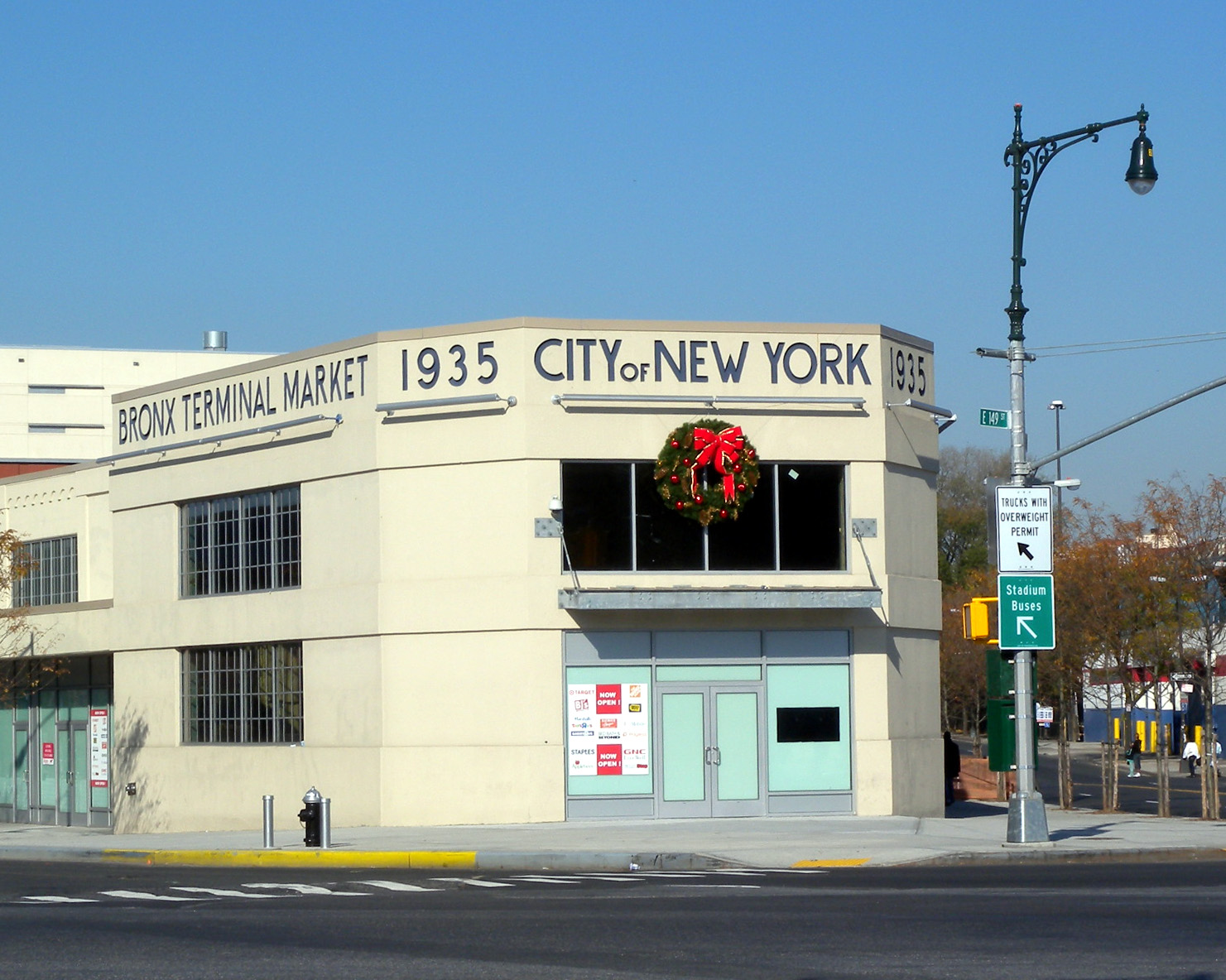
Bronx Terminal Market

William Fellowes Morgan Jr. (March 13, 1889 – December 23, 1977) was the President of the Middle Atlantic Oyster Fisheries in 1925, and was the Commissioner of Public Markets for New York City around 1934 through 1942, for at least eight years. He oversaw the opening of The Bronx Terminal Market in 1935. His father was William Fellowes Morgan Sr. (1861–1943) a refrigerated storage business tycoon; his mother was tennis player Emma Leavitt-Morgan (1865–1956). His sisters were Pauline Morgan Dodge and Beatrice Morgan Pruyn Goodrich.

== Lawsuits ==
- 1934 June 1, 1934; Matter of Cassidy v. Morgan
- 1940 May 27, 1940; Russo v. Morgan
- 1940 May 31, 1940; Matter of Joyce v. Morgan
