= Warlick =

Warlick is a surname. Notable people with the surname include:

- Bob Warlick (1941–2005), American basketball player
- David Warlick (born 1952), American educator, author, programmer and public speaker
- Ernie Warlick (1932–2012), American football player
- Hermene Warlick Eichhorn (1906–2001), American musician and composer
- Holly Warlick (born 1958), American women's basketball coach and former player
- James B. Warlick Jr. (born 1956), American diplomat
- Lula Warlick (1884–1957), American nurse
- Mary Burce Warlick (born 1957), American diplomat
- Tom Warlick (1888–1939), American football player and coach
- Wilson Warlick (1892–1978), American judge
