= Mark Burkhalter =

American politician (born 1960)

United States Ambassador to Moldova
- Incumbent
- Assumed office September 30, 2026
- President: Donald Trump
- Preceded by: Kent D. Logsdon

Speaker pro tempore of the Georgia House of Representatives
- In office January 10, 2005 – January 11, 2010
- Preceded by: Jack Connell
- Succeeded by: Jan Jones

Member of the Georgia House of Representatives
- In office January 11, 1993 – January 10, 2011
- Preceded by: Charlie Watts
- Succeeded by: Lynne Riley
- Constituency: 41st district (1993–2003); 36th district (2003–2005); 50th district (2005–2011)

Personal details
- Born: December 12, 1960 (age 65) Atlanta, Georgia, U.S.
- Party: Republican
- Spouse: Gina
- Children: 3
- Education: University of Georgia (BA)

Joseph Mark Burkhalter (born December 12, 1960) is an American politician and real estate developer who has been serving as the Ambassador of the United States to Moldova since September 2026. He had served in the Georgia House of Representatives from 1993 to 2011.

== Early life and education ==
Burkhalter was born in Atlanta, Georgia. He graduated from the University of Georgia in 1984 with bachelor's degree in Global Studies (Political Science) and a minor in German and Slavic languages. He is conversant in German and has extensive background in multiple other foreign languages.

Burkhalter previously served on the Boards of the North Fulton Chamber of Commerce and the North Fulton Community Improvement District in Alpharetta, Georgia. For almost a decade, he also served on the Development Board for the University of Georgia at Oxford, a program which offers more than 200 University of Georgia students the opportunity to travel and learn while living at Oxford University in the United Kingdom.

== Political career ==
Burkhalter was elected to the Georgia House of Representatives from the 41st district between 1993 and 2003. He continued his service from the 36th district between 2003 and 2005. Burkhalter went on to represent the 50th district in the session between 2005 and 2011. During his terms in the Georgia General Assembly, he served as both Speaker and Speaker Pro Tempore of the Georgia House of Representatives. The various districts he represented were located in the Atlanta suburbs of north Fulton County in Georgia.

=== 1994 campaign advertisement incident ===
During the 1994 election cycle, Burkhalter served as campaign chairman for Mitch Skandalakis in Georgia. As part of the campaign’s strategy, a flyer was distributed featuring a distorted image of Gordon Joyner, a political opponent. The flyer’s design led to public discussions and concerns regarding its portrayal, with some critics viewing it as racist.

The flyer resulted in a libel lawsuit against Burkhalter, which was settled in October 1995 for an undisclosed sum. Skandalakis, Burkhalter, and other campaign officials signed a letter to Joyner in which they took "full responsibility" for the flyer. The letter said the flier “contained a distorted photograph of you and inaccurate statements regarding you and attributed to you.” An ethics commission later found that "Burkhalter signed a consent order stating that he personally authorized payment for the flyer." The incident later resulted in a failed 2020 nomination to the post of US Ambassador to Norway.

== Ambassadorial nomination ==
President Donald Trump nominated Burkhalter to serve as the United States Ambassador to Norway on May 15, 2020. On July 14, 2020, the NAACP issued a statement opposing Burkhalter's nomination and calling for his withdrawal. Derrick Johnson, president & CEO of the NAACP, was quoted as saying that “Mr. Burkhalter’s actions [regarding the aforementioned ads] were racist and deeply offensive. It is inconceivable that someone who sought to use racial prejudice to influence the electoral process could now be chosen to represent our democracy to the world." On January 3, 2021, his nomination was returned to the President under Rule XXXI, Paragraph 6 of the United States Senate. Prior to his nomination, Burkhalter had been working at the multinational law firm Dentons, which said that Burkhalter resigned effective June 30, 2020, two days before the first media reports about his role in the racist ad controversy.

In August of 2026 he was confirmed as US Ambassador to Moldova.

== Business career ==
Parallel to his service in government, Burkhalter built a successful career in real estate development.

== Personal life ==
Burkhalter and his wife Gina, have three children.

The amphitheater in Newtown Park, Johns Creek, is named in honor of Burkhalter for his efforts in gaining city status for Johns Creek.

Georgia House of Representatives
Preceded by Charlie Watts	Member of the Georgia House of Representatives from the 41st district January 11, 1993–January 13, 2003	Succeeded by Joe Wilkinson
Preceded by Earl Ehrhart	Member of the Georgia House of Representatives from the 36th district January 13, 2003–January 10, 2005	Succeeded by Earl Ehrhart
Preceded by Georganna Sinkfield	Member of the Georgia House of Representatives from the 50th district January 10, 2005–January 10, 2011	Succeeded by Lynne Riley
Preceded by Jack Connell	Speaker pro tempore of the Georgia House of Representatives; January 10, 2005–January 11, 2010	Succeeded by Jan Jones
