= William Moser =

William Moser may refer to:

- William H. Moser (born 1964), American diplomat
- William R. Moser (1927–2003), American lawyer and judge in Wisconsin
