= Georgia House Bill 51 =

House Bill 51 (full title: Postsecondary institutions; reporting and investigation of certain crimes by officials and employees; provide manner) was a bill introduced into the Georgia House of Representatives which would have limited the ability of college campuses in Georgia to investigate alleged sex crimes committed on campus. For example, it would have effectively sidestepped the common university practice of holding so-called "Title IX hearings" to decide whether to discipline a student accused of sexual assault. Instead, the bill would require some university employees to report possible felonies to law enforcement. The bill was introduced by Representative Earl Ehrhart (R-Powder Springs) on January 11, 2017, and was passed by the House of Representatives on March 1, 2017, in a 115-55 vote. On March 24, the Georgia State Senate Judiciary Committee tabled the bill, On March 28, Ehrhart replaced a part of Senate Bill 71 that pertained to health savings accounts with language from House Bill 51 in an effort to get it passed. Nevertheless, this bill, like HB51, failed to receive final approval before the state legislature ended its work for the year. However, it was still able to be considered for passage in 2018 session.

House Bill 51 was officially defeated when the Senate Education Committee tabled the bill early in the 2018 session.
