= List of ambassadors of the United States to Serbia =

Ambassador of the United States to Serbia
- Амбасадор Сједињених Држава у Србији
- Seal of the United States Department of State

- Flag of a United States ambassador
- Status: Vacant
- Nominator: The president of the United States
- Inaugural holder: Eugene Schuyler as Envoy Extraordinary and Minister Plenipotentiary
- Formation: November 10, 1882
- Website: U.S. Embassy - Belgrade

The United States established diplomatic relations with Serbia on November 10, 1882 when Eugene Schuyler was appointed resident U.S. ambassador to Serbia, Romania and Greece, in Athens. The United States Embassy in Serbia is located in Belgrade. The embassy has been overseen by interim chargé d'affaires Alexander Titolo since 2025. The U.S. ambassadorship to Serbia has been formally vacated since January 2025.

Some parts of today's Serbia had been under the occupation of the Ottoman Empire (from 1459 until 1804) while other parts were occupied by Habsburg monarchy (1526–1804), Austrian Empire (1804–1867), and Austria-Hungary (1867–1918). Upon regaining its independence (partial in 1804 and full in 1878), the Serbian state strengthened and expanded and was in 1918 the driving force behind the creation of Yugoslavia (the land of South Slavs, a multi-ethnic state that over the following seven decades experienced various models of governance). In 1992 Yugoslavia disintegrated, although two of its constituent units - Serbia and Montenegro - continued in the same federal state under the same name Yugoslavia until 2003, when they re-organized into Serbia and Montenegro. After the Montenegrin independence referendum in May 2006, Serbia, as the only remaining unit in the federation, restored its independence on 5 June 2006.

Since July 17, 1919, U.S. diplomatic missions were based in Yugoslavia and since May 1992 after the breakup of Socialist Federal Republic of Yugoslavia, Serbia – United States relations cooled off, were severed after the 1999 NATO bombing of Yugoslavia. The U.S. Embassy formally reopened in Belgrade in May 2001.

== Ambassadors ==
Portrait	Name	Title	Appointed	Presented credentials	Terminated mission	Notes
Kingdom of Serbia
	Eugene Schuyler – Career FSO	Envoy Extraordinary and Minister Plenipotentiary	November 10, 1882		September 19, 1884	Resident in Athens, Greece
	Walker Fearn – Career FSO	Envoy Extraordinary and Minister Plenipotentiary	September 19, 1884	September 28, 1885	October 24, 1889	Resident in Athens, Greece
	A. Loudon Snowden – Career FSO	Envoy Extraordinary and Minister Plenipotentiary	October 24, 1889	November 28, 1889	August 25, 1892	Resident in Athens, Greece
	Eben Alexander – Career FSO	Envoy Extraordinary and Minister Plenipotentiary	August 25, 1892	June 29, 1894	August 10, 1897	Resident in Athens, Greece
	William Woodville Rockhill – Career FSO	Envoy Extraordinary and Minister Plenipotentiary	August 10, 1897	May 7, 1898	April 27, 1899	Resident in Athens, Greece
	Arthur S. Hardy – Career FSO	Envoy Extraordinary and Minister Plenipotentiary	April 27, 1899	June 24, 1900	March 2, 1901	Resident in Athens, Greece
	Charles S. Francis – Career FSO	Envoy Extraordinary and Minister Plenipotentiary	March 2, 1901	May 13, 1901	December 24, 1902	Resident in Athens, Greece
	John Brinkerhoff Jackson – Career FSO	Envoy Extraordinary and Minister Plenipotentiary	December 24, 1902	October 13, 1902	July 13, 1905	Resident in Athens, Greece
	John W. Riddle – Career FSO	Envoy Extraordinary and Minister Plenipotentiary	July 13, 1905	May 7, 1906	January 23, 1907	Resident in Bucharest, Romania
	Horace G. Knowles – Career FSO	Envoy Extraordinary and Minister Plenipotentiary	January 23, 1907	January 16, 1907	February 4, 1909	Resident in Bucharest, Romania
	John R. Carter – Career FSO	Envoy Extraordinary and Minister Plenipotentiary	February 4, 1909	May 3, 1910	October 27, 1911	Resident in Bucharest, Romania
	John Brinkerhoff Jackson – Career FSO	Envoy Extraordinary and Minister Plenipotentiary	October 27, 1911	January 16, 1912	October 15, 1913	Resident in Bucharest, Romania
	Charles J. Vopicka – Career FSO	Envoy Extraordinary and Minister Plenipotentiary	October 15, 1913	December 15, 1913	December 17, 1918	Resident in Bucharest, Romania
For U.S. Ambassadors between 1918 and 1992, see United States Ambassador to Yugoslavia
Serbia and Montenegro; The United States announced in May 1992 that it would not recognize the Federal Republic of Yugoslavia (comprising Serbia and Montenegro) as the successor to the Socialist Federal Republic of Yugoslavia, and until 2000 used an appelation "Serbia-Montenegro" instead, when it switched to an appelation "Federal Republic of Yugoslavia". The FR Yugoslavia was reconstituted as the State Union of Serbia and Montenegro in 2003, before its dissolution in 2006.
	Robert Rackmales – Career FSO	Chargés d'affaires ad interim	May 1992	N/A	July 1993	
	Rudolf V. Perina – Career FSO	Chargés d'affaires ad interim	July 1993	N/A	February 1996	
	Lawrence Butler – Career FSO	Chargés d'affaires ad interim	February 1996	N/A	August 1996	
	Richard M. Miles – Career FSO	Chargés d'affaires ad interim	August 1996	N/A	March 1999	
The embassy was closed from March 1999 to October 2000.
	William Dale Montgomery – Career FSO	Chargés d'affaires ad interim	October 2000	N/A	January 2002	
	William Dale Montgomery – Career FSO	Ambassador Extraordinary and Plenipotentiary	January 4, 2002	January 4, 2002	February 29, 2004	
	Michael C. Polt – Career FSO	Ambassador Extraordinary and Plenipotentiary	February 29, 2004	May 21, 2004	August 3, 2007	
Republic of Serbia
	Cameron Munter – Career FSO	Ambassador Extraordinary and Plenipotentiary	July 26, 2007	August 15, 2007	January 19, 2010	
	Mary Burce Warlick – Career FSO	Ambassador Extraordinary and Plenipotentiary	December 24, 2009	January 28, 2010	September 17, 2012	
	Michael David Kirby – Career FSO	Ambassador Extraordinary and Plenipotentiary	August 3, 2012	September 19, 2012	January 29, 2016	
	Kyle Randolph Scott – Career FSO	Ambassador Extraordinary and Plenipotentiary	September 15, 2015	February 5, 2016	September 27, 2019	
	Anthony Francis Godfrey – Career FSO	Ambassador Extraordinary and Plenipotentiary	September 30, 2019	October 24, 2019	February 12, 2022	
	Christopher Robert Hill – Career FSO	Ambassador Extraordinary and Plenipotentiary	March 11, 2022	March 31, 2022	January 10, 2025	

== See also ==
- Serbia–United States relations
- Foreign relations of the United States
