= List of ambassadors of the United States to Moldova =

United States Ambassador to Moldova
- Ambasadorul Statelor Unite în Moldova
- Seal of the United States Department of State

- Flag of a United States ambassador
- Incumbent; Mark Burkhalter since September 30, 2026
- Nominator: The president of the United States
- Appointer: The president; with Senate advice and consent
- Inaugural holder: Mary Pendleton as Ambassador
- Formation: March 1992
- Website: U.S. Embassy - Chişinău

The United States ambassador to Moldova is the official representative of the president of the United States to the head of state of Moldova.

== History ==
Until 1991, the Moldavian Soviet Socialist Republic had been a constituent SSR of the Soviet Union. Following the dissolution of the Soviet Union, the Supreme Soviet of the Moldavian SSR declared itself independent on August 27, 1991, and renamed itself the Republic of Moldova. The United States recognized Moldova on December 26, 1991, and established diplomatic relations February 18, 1992. The U.S. embassy in Chişinău was established March 13, 1992, with Howard Steers as Chargé d’Affaires ad interim.

== Ambassadors and chiefs of mission ==
Name	Title	Appointed	Presented credentials	Terminated mission	Notes
Howard Steers – Career FSO	Chargé d’Affaires a.i.	February 18, 1992	—	Superseded by ambassador, August 26, 1992	
Mary Pendleton – Career FSO	Ambassador Extraordinary and Plenipotentiary	August 11, 1992	August 26, 1992	August 12, 1995	
John Todd Stewart – Career FSO	Ambassador Extraordinary and Plenipotentiary	October 3, 1995	November 16, 1995	August 5, 1998	
Rudolf V. Perina – Career FSO	Ambassador Extraordinary and Plenipotentiary	June 29, 1998	September 11, 1998	September 23, 2001	
Pamela Hyde Smith – Career FSO	Ambassador Extraordinary and Plenipotentiary	October 1, 2001	November 29, 2001	May 10, 2003	
Heather M. Hodges – Career FSO	Ambassador Extraordinary and Plenipotentiary	April 16, 2003	October 3, 2003	April 9, 2006	
Michael D. Kirby – Career FSO	Ambassador Extraordinary and Plenipotentiary	May 30, 2006	September 21, 2006	June 25, 2008	
Asif J. Chaudhry – Career FSO	Ambassador Extraordinary and Plenipotentiary	July 11, 2008	September 24, 2008	July 25, 2011	
Marcus Micheli	Chargé d’Affaires a.i.	July 25, 2011		September 21, 2011	
William H. Moser – Career FSO	Ambassador Extraordinary and Plenipotentiary	August 4, 2011	September 21, 2011	January 22, 2015	
James Pettit – Career FSO	Ambassador Extraordinary and Plenipotentiary	January 16, 2015	January 30, 2015	September 24, 2018	
Dereck J. Hogan – Career FSO	Ambassador Extraordinary and Plenipotentiary	September 12, 2018	November 2, 2018	July 21, 2021	
Laura Hruby	Chargé d’Affaires a.i.	July 21, 2021		February 16, 2022	
Kent D. Logsdon – Career FSO	Ambassador Extraordinary and Plenipotentiary	December 18, 2021	February 16, 2022	May 30, 2024	
Laura Hruby	Chargé d’Affaires a.i.	May 31, 2024		July 10, 2024	
Nina Maria Fite	Chargé d’Affaires a.i.	July 10, 2024		September 19, 2024	
Daniela DiPierro	Chargé d’Affaires a.i.	September 19, 2024		December 2, 2024	
Kevin Covert	Chargé d’Affaires a.i.	December 2, 2024		December 23, 2024	
Daniela DiPierro	Chargé d’Affaires a.i.	December 23, 2024		July 11, 2025	
Kevin Covert	Chargé d’Affaires a.i.	July 14, 2025		August 1, 2025	
Nick Pietrowicz	Chargé d’Affaires a.i.	August 4, 2025		September 30, 2026	
Mark Burkhalter - Political appointee	Ambassador Extraordinary and Plenipotentiary	August 7, 2026	September 30, 2026	Present	

== See also ==
- Embassy of Moldova, Washington, D.C.
- Embassy of the United States, Chișinău
- Moldova–United States relations
- Foreign relations of Moldova
- Ambassadors of the United States
