= Lynne Riley =

American politician

Treasurer of Georgia
- In office May 1, 2019 – July 16, 2020
- Governor: Brian Kemp
- Preceded by: Steve McCoy
- Succeeded by: Steve McCoy

Member of the Georgia House of Representatives from the 50th district
- In office January 10, 2011 – November 7, 2014
- Preceded by: Mark Burkhalter
- Succeeded by: Brad Raffensperger

Personal details
- Born: September 8, 1958 (age 67) Scituate, Massachusetts, U.S.
- Party: Republican
- Education: Northeastern University; Bentley University

Lynne Riley (born September 8, 1958) is an American accountant and politician who served as Treasurer of Georgia from 2019 to 2020, appointed by Governor Brian Kemp in May of the former year.

== Career before politics ==
Riley was an accountant.

== Political career ==
A Republican, Riley was elected to the Fulton County Commission in a 2004 special election to fill a vacancy caused by the death of a member. She was reelected in 2006, and served until 2010, after being elected to the Georgia House of Representatives. While on the county commission, Riley was a supporter of a controversial proposal for the secession of north Fulton County from the rest of the county, re-creating Milton County.

Riley was a member of the state House from the 50th district from 2011 to 2014. Riley's seat was a safe Republican district in north Fulton County; her only contested election for the seat was in 2010, when she won with 70% of the vote. While in the House, Riley was an ally of Republican Governor Nathan Deal and one of his chief supporters within the state legislature; she held the position of Governor's Floor Leader. She was also a member of the House's tax-writing committee.

In November 2014, Riley resigned from the state House after Deal appointed her to the position of commissioner of the Georgia Department of Revenue, effective January 11, 2015. Riley succeeded Douglas MacGinnitie as commissioner. Riley left the Department of Revenue in mid-2019 to accept an appointment from Republican Governor Brian Kemp to the post of Treasurer of Georgia. Riley was appointed by Governor Brian Kemp to serve as President of the Georgia Student Finance Commission on July 16, 2020.

Riley lives in Johns Creek, Georgia.

Political offices
Preceded by Steve McCoy	Treasurer of Georgia; 2019–2020	Succeeded by Steve McCoy
