= Dereck J. Hogan =

American diplomat

Dereck Hogan
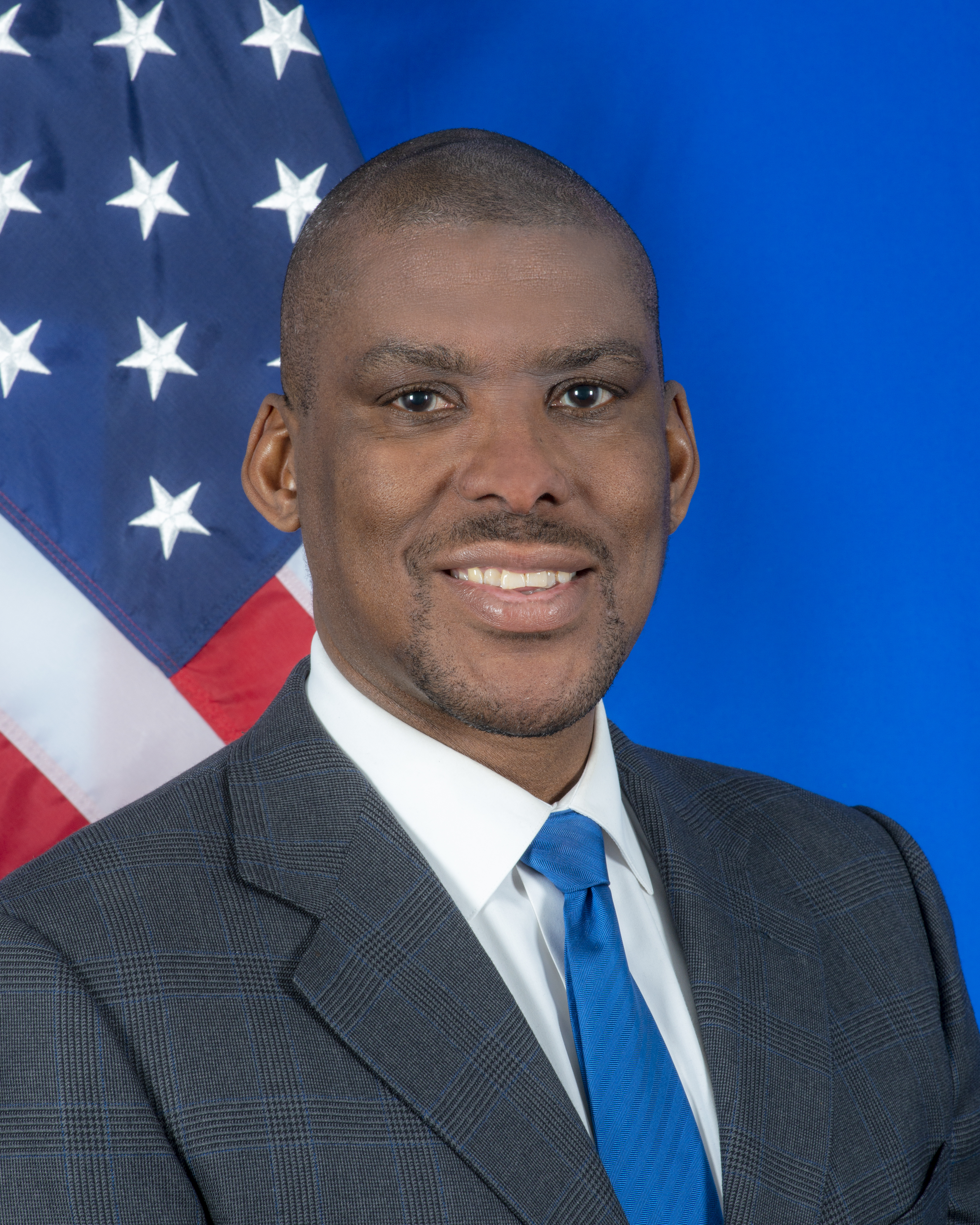

28th Executive Secretary of the United States Department of State
- In office August 7, 2023 – January 20, 2025
- President: Joe Biden
- Preceded by: Kamala Shirin Lakhdhir
- Succeeded by: Lisa D. Kenna

United States Ambassador to Moldova
- In office November 2, 2018 – July 21, 2021
- President: Donald Trump; Joe Biden
- Preceded by: James Pettit
- Succeeded by: Kent Logsdon

Personal details
- Born: Dereck Jamal Hogan
- Spouse: Anny Hogan
- Children: 1
- Education: University of Pittsburgh (BA); Princeton University (MPA)

Dereck Jamal Hogan is an American diplomat who had served as United States Ambassador to Moldova. He had served as Principal Deputy and Acting Assistant Secretary in the Bureau of European and Eurasian Affairs.

He was appointed Executive Secretary of the United States Department of State on 7 August 2023.

He resigned from the State Department in 2025 following Donald Trump's re-election.

== Education ==
Hogan received a Bachelor of Arts degree from University of Pittsburgh and a Master of Public Affairs in International Relations from the Woodrow Wilson School at Princeton University.

== Career ==
Hogan is a career member of the Senior Foreign Service. He has been working for the State Department since 1997. He has served at multiple capacities including being the Deputy Chief of Mission and Chargé d'Affaires at the U.S. Embassy in Azerbaijan, Director of the office of Nordic and Baltic Affairs in the Department's Bureau of European and Eurasian Affairs and has worked in U.S. embassies in Belarus, Dominican Republic and Nicaragua. He was also Special Assistant to Secretary of State Colin Powell.

=== United States Ambassador to Moldova ===
On June 22, 2018, President Trump nominated Hogan to be the next United States Ambassador to Moldova. On September 6, 2018, the Senate confirmed his nomination by voice vote. He presented his credentials to the President of Moldova on November 2, 2018.

=== Bureau of European and Eurasian Affairs ===
Hogan had served as Principal Deputy Assistant Secretary in the Bureau of European and Eurasian Affairs from September 2, 2021 to July 10, 2023.

=== Executive Secretary ===
Hogan has served as Executive Secretary of the United States Department of State since August 7, 2023. On January 15, 2025 incoming President Donald Trump asked for Hogan's resignation.

== Personal life ==
Hogan and his wife, Anny, have one daughter. He speaks Russian, Romanian and Spanish.

== See also ==
- List of ambassadors of the United States
- List of ambassadors appointed by Donald Trump

Diplomatic posts
Preceded by James Pettit	United States Ambassador to Moldova; 2018–2021	Succeeded by Kent Logsdon
