= Kyle Randolph Scott =

American diplomat

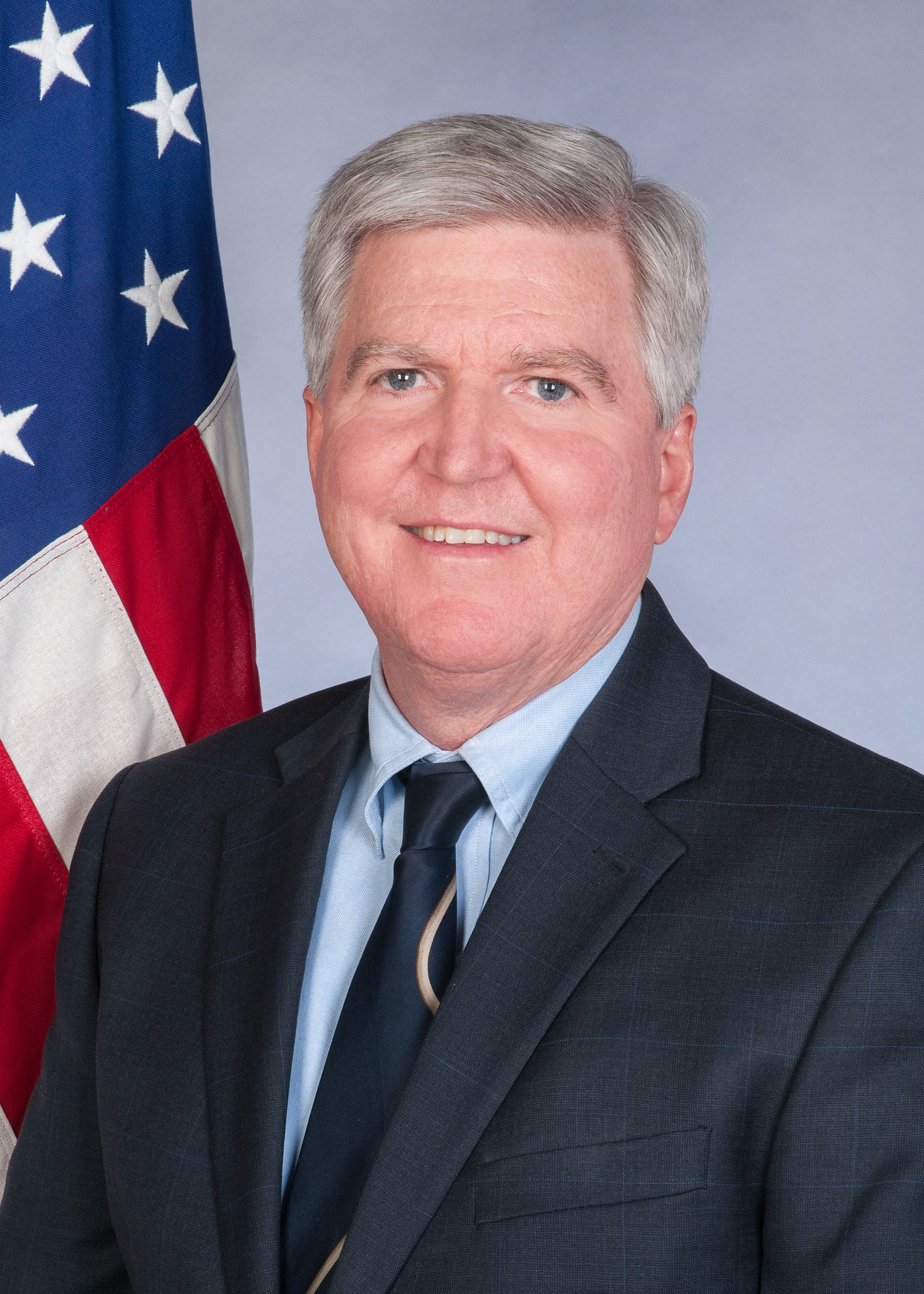
- Official portrait, 2016

United States Ambassador to Serbia
- In office February 5, 2016 – September 26, 2019
- President: Barack Obama; Donald Trump
- Deputy: Kurt Donnelly
- Preceded by: Michael David Kirby
- Succeeded by: Anthony F. Godfrey

Personal details
- Born: 1957 (age 68–69) United States
- Education: Arizona State University; Thunderbird School of Global Management

Kyle Randolph Scott (born 1957) is a U.S. diplomat in the Senior Foreign Service and a former U.S. Ambassador to Serbia.

== Education ==
Scott attended Arizona State University, earning a Bachelor of Arts in German language and literature while also minoring in Russian. He then went on to the Thunderbird School of Global Management, studying international business and finance.

== Career ==
Scott's early State Department assignments included Croatia, Israel, and Switzerland. In 1994, Scott was a national security fellow at the Hoover Institution at Stanford University. Scott served as a political counselor at the embassies in Moscow and Budapest in the late 1990s.

In 2003, Scott was a political minister-counselor at the U.S. mission to the European Union. In 2005, he was named deputy chief of mission at the Organization for Security and Cooperation in Europe, based in Vienna.

Scott returned to Washington in 2009 as director of the Office of Russian Affairs in the Bureau of European and Eurasian Affairs. Under his watch, the United States and Russia cooperated on Iranian issues and began to negotiate the New Strategic Arms Reduction Treaty (New START) agreement to reduce nuclear weapon stockpiles, launchers and heavy bombers.

Afterwards, from 2011 to 2014, Scott served as the consul general in Milan, Italy. In 2014, he was made the Department of State's senior fellow at the German Marshall Fund.

President Barack Obama nominated Scott to be U.S. Ambassador to Serbia on September 15, 2015. Scott testified before the Senate Foreign Relations Committee on December 2, 2015. Scott was confirmed, and presented his credentials to the government of Serbia on February 5, 2016.

== Personal life ==
Scott is married and has two sons. In addition to English, he has learned Russian, German, Croatian, Italian, Serbian, Hungarian, French, and Hebrew.

Diplomatic posts
Preceded by Michael David Kirby	U.S. Ambassador to Serbia; February 5, 2016–September 26, 2019	Succeeded by Anthony F. Godfrey
