= James D. Pettit =

American diplomat (born 1956)

James Pettit
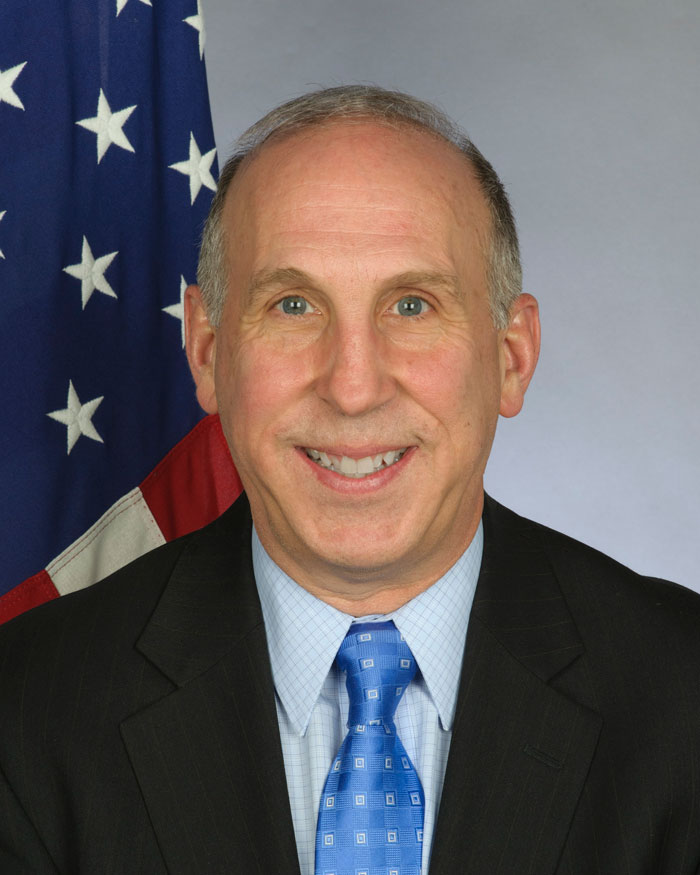
- Official portrait, 2015

United States Ambassador to Moldova
- In office January 16, 2015 – September 24, 2018
- President: Barack Obama; Donald Trump
- Preceded by: William H. Moser
- Succeeded by: Dereck J. Hogan

Personal details
- Born: 1956 (age 69–70) North Dakota, United States
- Education: Iowa State University; National War College

James D. Pettit (born 1956) is an American diplomat, who served as United States Ambassador to Moldova in 2015–2018. He was nominated by President Barack Obama and confirmed by the Senate. Pettit was sworn in as U.S. Ambassador to the Republic of Moldova on January 16, 2015. He presented his credentials to President Nicolae Timofti on January 30, 2015.

== Biography ==
Pettit was born in North Dakota, moving to Hamburg, Iowa with his family when he was 7, and later to Council Bluffs, Iowa, at age 15. His father, Jack Pettit, was a Presbyterian minister. James Pettit graduated from Lewis Central High School in Council Bluffs in 1974. He received a B.A. in International Studies from Iowa State University, and a M.A. in National Strategic Studies from the National War College. Between 2007 and 2010 Pettit was the Deputy Chief of Mission at the U.S. Embassy in Kyiv, and previously Pettit served the Department of State as Consul General at the U.S. Embassy in Moscow, Russia (2003 – 2007), Consul General at Embassy Vienna, Austria (1999 – 2003), Director of Office of Post Liaison/Visa Office (1997 – 1999), Director of Washington Processing Center, Bureau of Population, Refugees and Migration (1995 – 1997), Deputy Consul General at U.S. Embassy Moscow, Russia (1992 – 1994), Desk Officer of Office of Taiwan Coordination (1990 – 1992), Desk Officer of Office of Cuban Affairs (1988 – 1990), Consular Officer at American Institute in Taiwan (AIT), Taipei, Taiwan (1986 – 1988), General Services/Political Officer at Embassy Moscow, former Soviet Union (1983 – 1985) and Consular Officer at Consulate General, Guadalajara, Mexico (1981 – 1983). Prior to that, he worked in the banking industry in Washington, D.C. While in Vienna, he served as chairman and Secretary of the executive board of the American International School of Vienna.

== United States Ambassador to Moldova ==
=== Nomination and confirmation ===
Pettit was sworn in as U.S. Ambassador to the Republic of Moldova on January 16, 2015. He presented his credentials to President Nicolae Timofti on January 30, 2015.

=== Tenure ===
In 2018 Pettit announced support the United States would provide Moldova in economic development as Moldova embraced government reforms and sought to eliminate corruption. The country has been known as a money laundering haven.

== Personal life ==
In 1981 Pettit married Nancy Bikoff Pettit, former U.S. Ambassador to the Republic of Latvia. The couple have two grown children. In addition to English he speaks Russian, Spanish, German, Mandarin Chinese, and Romanian.

== See also ==
- List of ambassadors of the United States

Diplomatic posts
Preceded by William H. Moser	United States Ambassador to Moldova; 2015–2018	Succeeded by Dereck J. Hogan
