= Nancy McEldowney =

American academic & diplomat (born 1958)

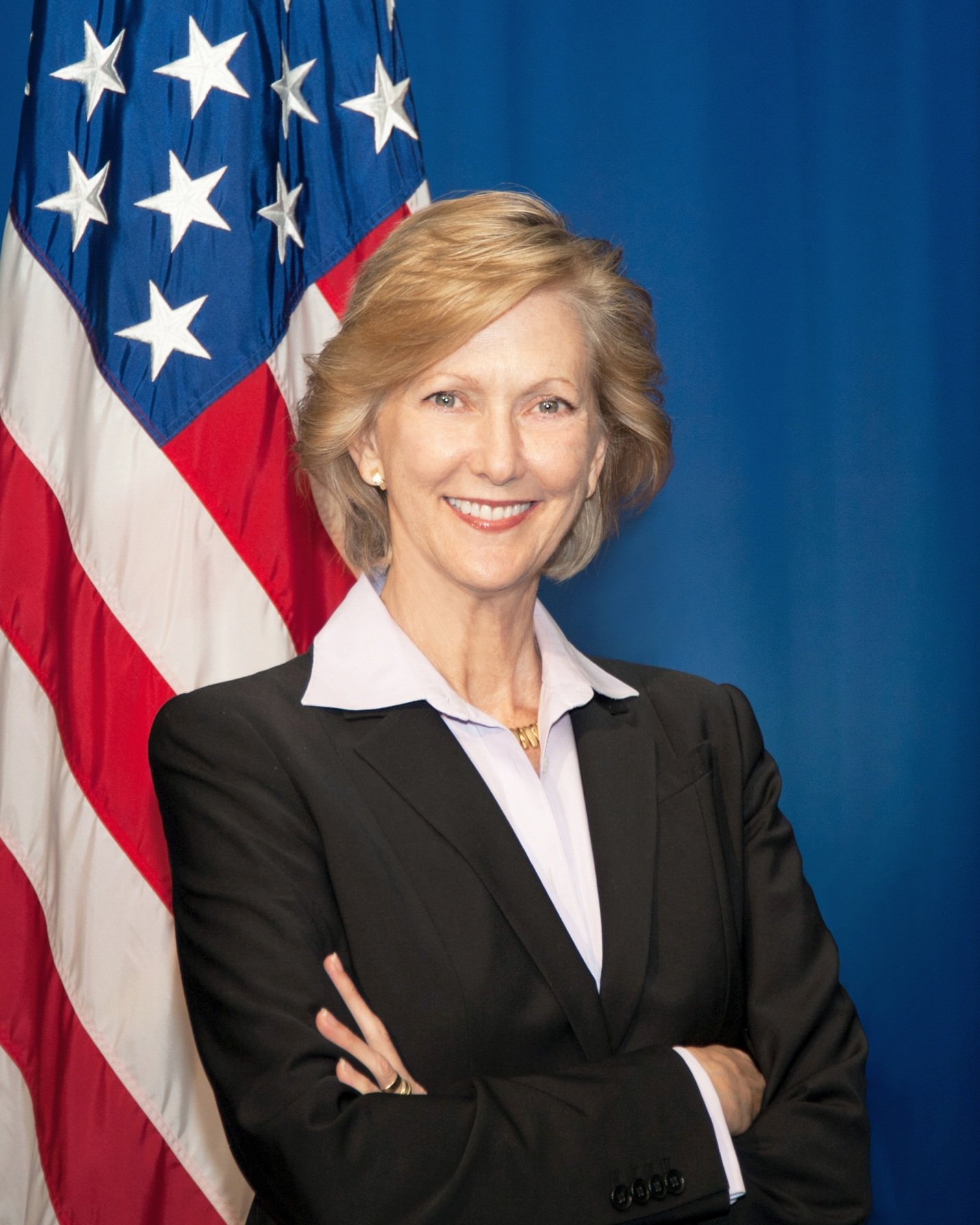

National Security Advisor to the Vice President
- In office January 20, 2021 – March 21, 2022
- Vice President: Kamala Harris
- Deputy: Philip H. Gordon
- Preceded by: Keith Kellogg
- Succeeded by: Philip H. Gordon

Director of the Foreign Service Institute
- In office February 19, 2013 – June 30, 2017
- President: Barack Obama; Donald Trump
- Secretary: John Kerry; Rex Tillerson
- Preceded by: Ruth Whiteside
- Succeeded by: Marc Ostfield (Acting)

United States Ambassador to Bulgaria
- In office August 26, 2008 – July 30, 2009
- President: George W. Bush; Barack Obama
- Secretary: Condoleezza Rice; Hillary Clinton
- Preceded by: John Beyrle
- Succeeded by: James Warlick

Personal details
- Born: October 6, 1958 (age 68) Clearwater, Florida, U.S.
- Education: New College of Florida (BA); Columbia University (MA); National Defense University (MA)

Nancy Eileen McEldowney (born October 6, 1958) is an American academic and diplomat who served as the national security advisor to Vice President Kamala Harris from January 20, 2021, to March 21, 2022. She was previously a career Foreign Service officer, served as United States ambassador to Bulgaria (2008–2009), and was director of the Foreign Service Institute from February 2013 until June 2017.

== Early life and education ==
McEldowney was born and raised in Clearwater Beach, Florida. After graduating from Clearwater High School, McEldowney earned a bachelor's degree from the New College of Florida, as well as master's degrees from the Columbia University School of International and Public Affairs and National Defense University. McEldowney has studied a number of languages, including French, Spanish, Russian, and Latin, and received professional training in Arabic, Azerbaijani, German, and Turkish.

== Career ==
As director of the Foreign Service Institute, McEldowney served as the chief learning officer in the United States Department of State.

Prior to her arrival at the Foreign Service Institute, McEldowney served as the interim president and senior vice president of the National Defense University from 2011 to 2013. She was also the principal deputy assistant secretary of state for European affairs from 2009 to 2011.

Overseas, McEldowney served as the ambassador to Bulgaria from 2008 to 2009, as well as the deputy chief of mission in Turkey from 2005 to 2008 and in Azerbaijan from 2001 to 2004.

McEldowney received the Joint Distinguished Civilian Service Award from the chairman of the Joint Chiefs of Staff in 2013. She also received the Order of Stara Planina (Medal of Honor) from the President of Bulgaria in 2009. She has been the recipient of the State Department's Senior Performance Award on nine occasions and the Superior Honor Award on five occasions. She was granted the Sinclair Linguistic Award in 2001. In July 2017, McEldowney became director of the Master of Science in Foreign Service program at Georgetown University.

In November 2020, McEldowney was named a volunteer member of the Joe Biden presidential transition Agency Review Team to support transition efforts related to the United States Department of State.

On December 3, 2020, it was announced that McEldowney would serve as the national security advisor to Vice President-elect Kamala Harris. She resigned in March 2022 and was succeeded by Philip H. Gordon.

Diplomatic posts
Preceded by John Beyrle	United States Ambassador to Bulgaria; 2008–2009	Succeeded by James Warlick
Preceded by Ruth A. Whiteside	Director of the Foreign Service Institute; 2013–2017	Succeeded by Marc Ostfield (Acting)
Government offices
Preceded by Keith Kellogg	National Security Advisor to the Vice President of the United States; January 20, 2021 – March 21, 2022	Succeeded by Philip H. Gordon
