= Kent D. Logsdon =

American diplomat

Kent Logsdon
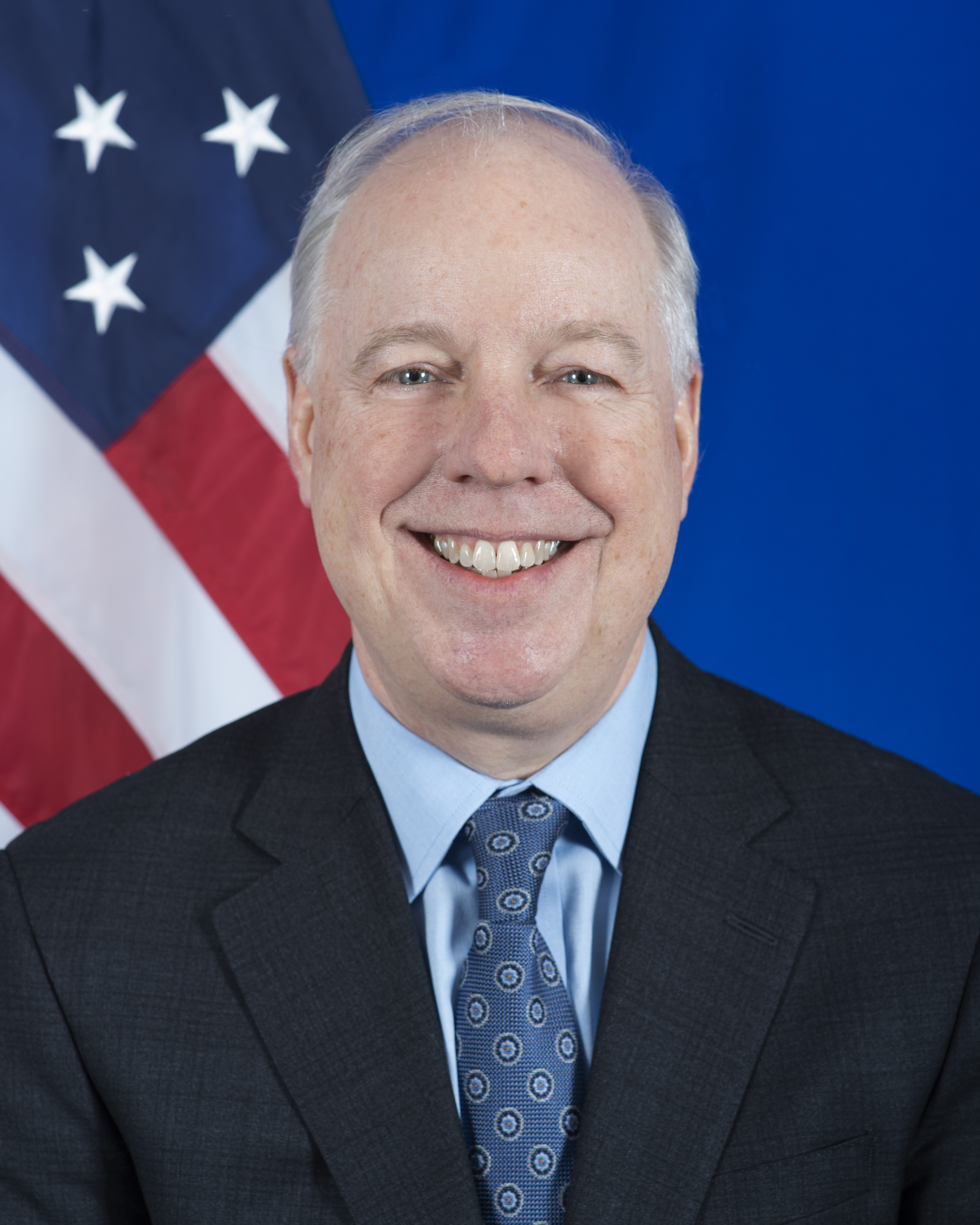
- Official portrait, 2022

United States Ambassador to Moldova
- In office February 16, 2022 – May 30, 2024
- President: Joe Biden
- Preceded by: Dereck J. Hogan
- Succeeded by: Mark Burkhalter

United States Ambassador to Germany
- Acting
- In office January 20, 2017 – May 8, 2018
- President: Donald Trump
- Preceded by: John B. Emerson (as Ambassador)
- Succeeded by: Richard Grenell

Personal details
- Born: Kent Doyle Logsdon Sewickley, Pennsylvania, U.S.
- Education: University of Notre Dame; University of Virginia

Kent Doyle Logsdon is an American diplomat who had served as the U.S. ambassador to Moldova. He previously served as the U.S. chargé d'affaires for Germany.

== Early life ==
A Sewickley, Pennsylvania native, Logsdon has a master's degree in international relations from the University of Virginia and a bachelor's degree in government from the University of Notre Dame.

== Career ==
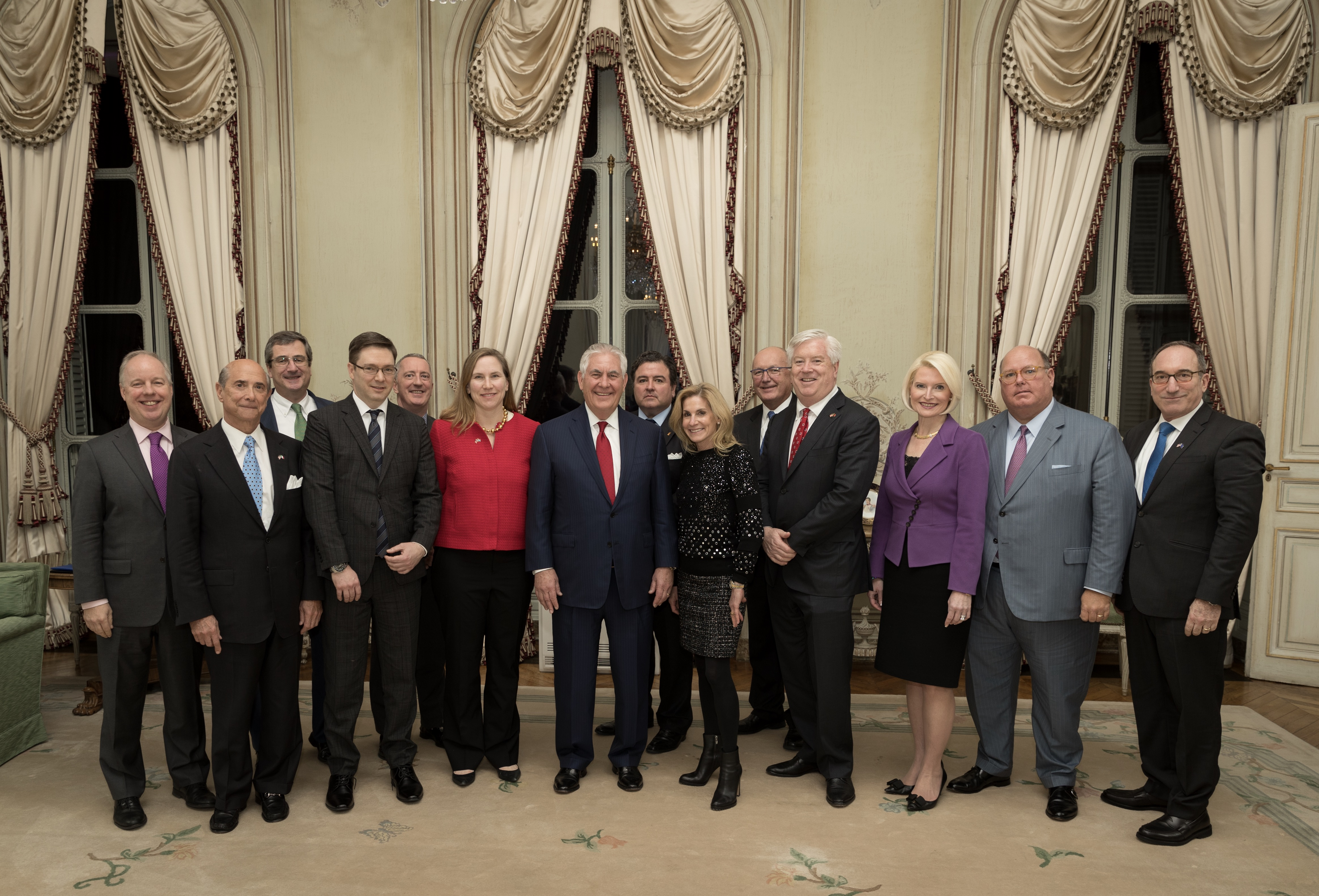
U.S. Secretary of State Rex Tillerson meets with ambassadors and chargés d'affaires during a regional chiefs of mission meeting in Paris, 2018, with Logsdon on the left.

A foreign service officer (a member of the Senior Foreign Service), Logsdon was chief of staff to under secretary for economic growth, energy and the environment Keith J. Krach from September 30, 2019, to July 30, 2021. Previously, he served as the principal deputy assistant secretary in the Bureau of Energy Resources. He came to that position after serving as the deputy chief of mission at the U.S. Embassy in Berlin, Germany, serving as chargé d'affaires from January 2017 to May 2018. Logsdon was the chief of staff to the deputy secretary of state for management and resources in Washington, D.C. before he went to Berlin.

According to the State Department, Logdson "has spent the bulk of his career, spanning over 34 years, in the European and Eurasia region."

=== United States ambassador to Moldova ===
On July 13, 2021, President Joe Biden nominated Logsdon to be the United States Ambassador to Moldova. On September 29, 2021, a hearing on his nomination was held before the Senate Foreign Relations Committee. On October 19, 2021, his nomination was reported favorably out of committee. On December 18, 2021, the United States Senate confirmed his nomination by voice vote. On February 16, 2022, he presented his credentials to President Maia Sandu.

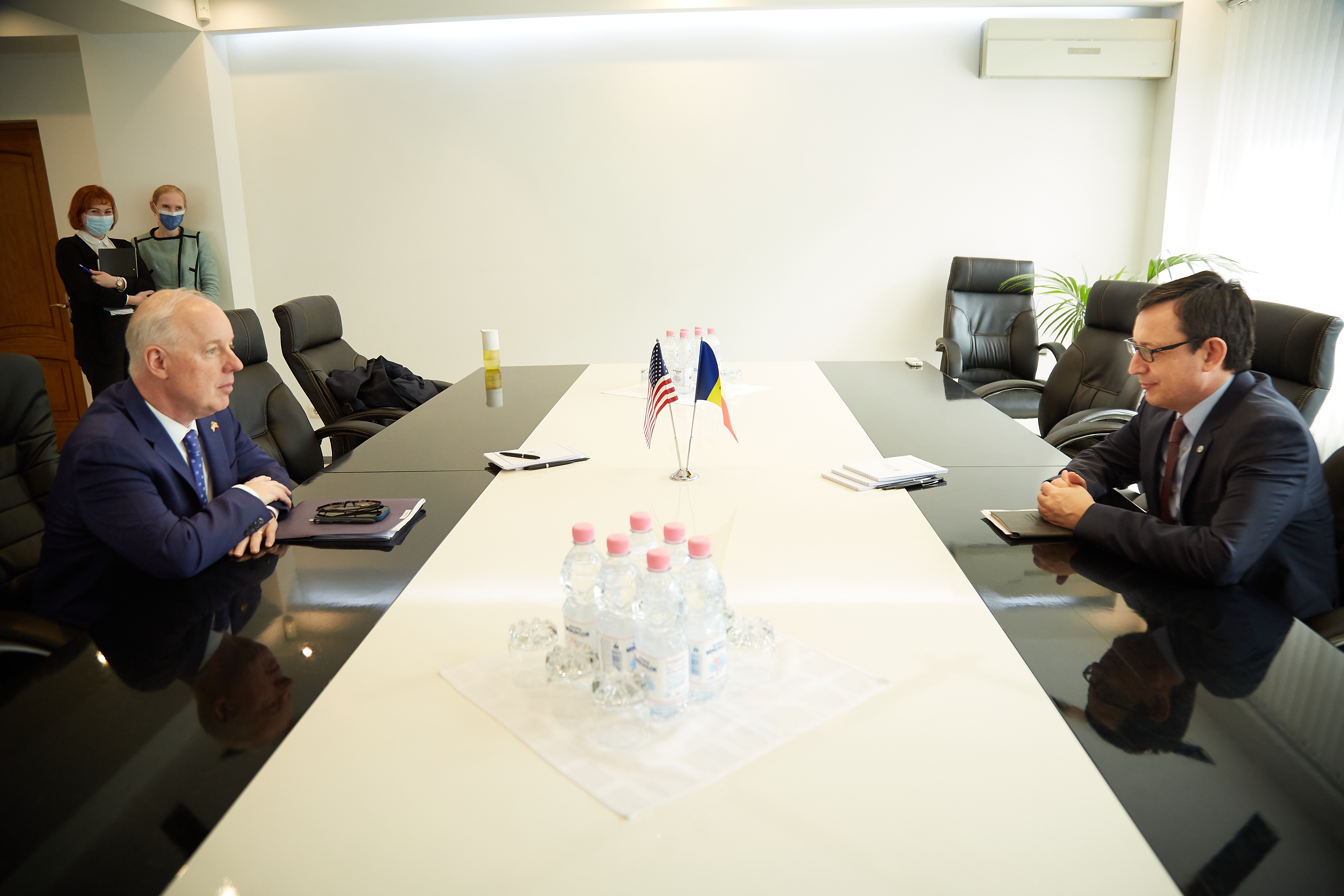
Logsdon meeting with Octavian Armașu, governor of the National Bank of Moldova, March 2022

On 21 May 2023, as a result of the pro-European rally European Moldova National Assembly held in Chișinău, the Embassy of the United States in Chișinău released a message stating that "The U.S. Embassy is proud to support Moldova's European path". Logsdon participated in this rally "to demonstrate our commitment to working with the Republic of Moldova to build a democratic, prosperous and secure future" as he declared.

== Honours ==
- – Order of Honour for the contribution brought to the deepening of Moldovan-American relations and the implementation of democratic and economic reforms in the Republic of Moldova, as well as for supporting the efforts of the Republic of Moldova to strengthen national security.

== Personal life ==
Logsdon speaks Russian, Ukrainian, Thai and German. He is also learning Romanian.

== See also ==
- List of ambassadors of the United States to Germany
- List of ambassadors of the United States to Moldova
- List of University of Notre Dame alumni

Diplomatic posts
Preceded by Dereck J. Hogan	United States Ambassador to Moldova; 2022–2024	Succeeded by Laura Hruby (Acting)
