= Mary C. Pendleton =

American diplomat (born 1940)

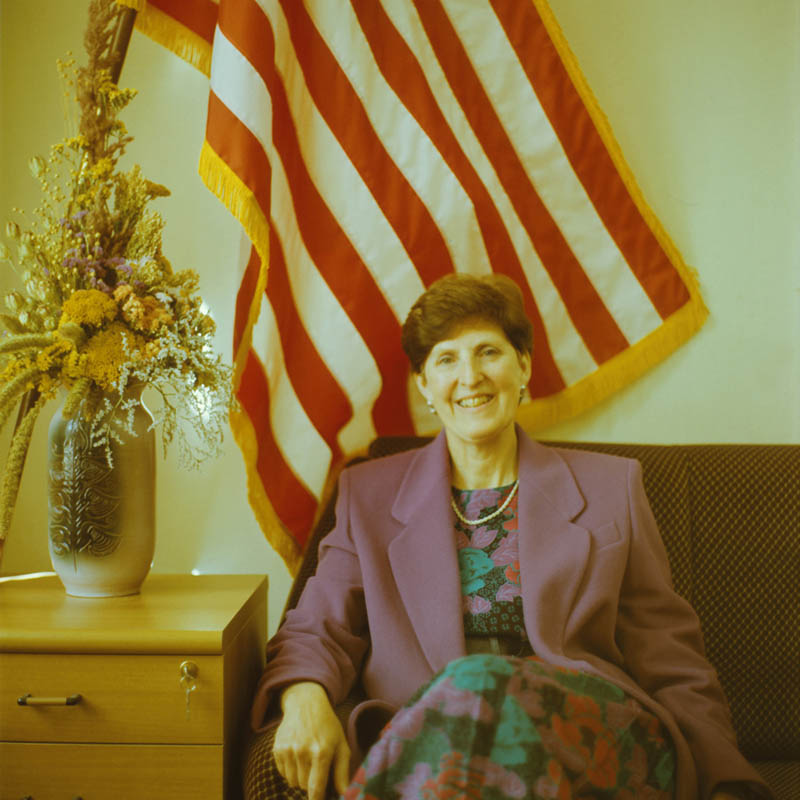
- Pendleton in 1992

United States Ambassador to Moldova
- In office 1992–1995

Personal details
- Born: June 15, 1940 (age 86) Jefferson County, Kentucky, U.S.
- Education: Spalding University (BA); Indiana University (MA)

Mary C. Pendleton (born June 15, 1940) is a retired American diplomat who was the first American ambassador to Moldova after it gained independence from the Soviet Union (1992 until 1995).

Pendleton graduated from Spalding University (B.A., 1962) and Indiana University (M.A., 1969).
