= Philip H. Gordon =

American diplomat and international relations scholar (born 1962)

Phil Gordon
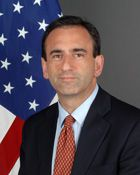

National Security Advisor to the Vice President
- In office March 21, 2022 – January 20, 2025
- Vice President: Kamala Harris
- Preceded by: Nancy McEldowney
- Succeeded by: Andy Baker

24th Assistant Secretary of State for European and Eurasian Affairs
- In office May 15, 2009 – March 11, 2013
- President: Barack Obama
- Preceded by: Daniel Fried
- Succeeded by: Victoria Nuland

Personal details
- Born: 1962 (age 63–64)
- Party: Democratic
- Education: Ohio University (BA); Johns Hopkins University (MA, PhD)

Philip H. Gordon (born 1962) is an American diplomat and international relations scholar.

From March 21, 2022 to January 20, 2025 he served as Assistant to the President and National Security Advisor to the Vice President of the United States, Kamala Harris.

Earlier in his career, he was Assistant Secretary of State for European and Eurasian Affairs (2009–2011) and Special Assistant to the President and White House Coordinator for the Middle East, North Africa, and the Persian Gulf Region (2013–2015) during the Obama administration.

== Education ==
Gordon received a B.A. from Ohio University in 1984, a M.A. and Ph.D. from Johns Hopkins University School of Advanced International Studies (SAIS) in 1987 and 1991, respectively.

== Career ==
=== Teaching career ===
Gordon held a number of research and teaching positions, including at the Brookings Institution in Washington, D.C.; the International Institute for Strategic Studies in London; INSEAD, the global graduate business school in Fontainebleau; the Institut d’Etudes Politiques (“Sciences Po”) in Paris; and the Deutsche Gesellschaft für Auswärtige Politik in Bonn.

=== Clinton administration ===
From 1998 to 1999, he served as the Director for European Affairs at the National Security Council under President Bill Clinton.

Gordon was a senior fellow at the Brookings Institution from 1999 to 2009, focusing his scholarship on Turkey, Iraq, and U.S.-Europe relations. He co-authored five books on France, Turkey, Iraq, and the Middle East.

=== Obama administration ===
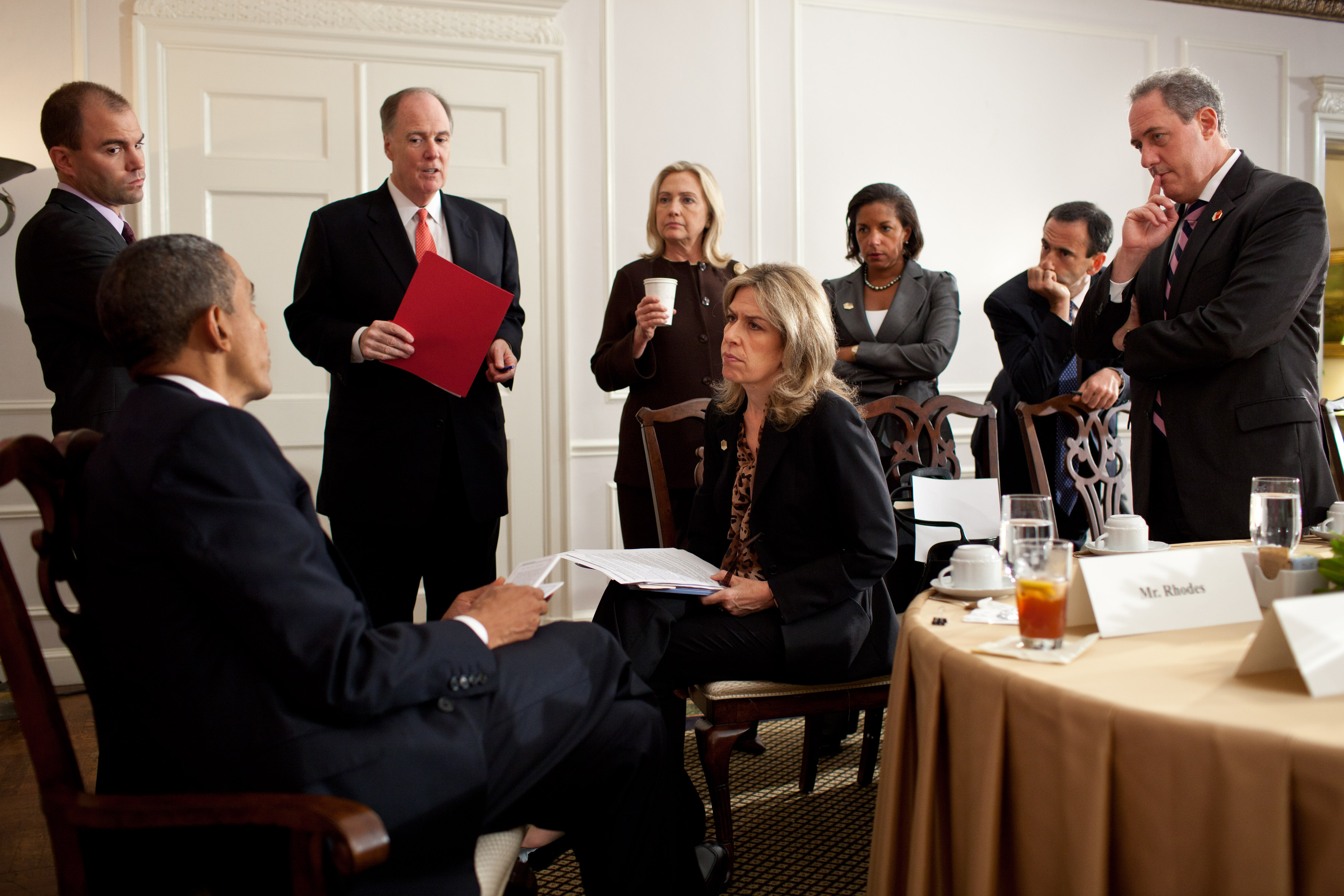
President Barack Obama with advisors, including Gordon (second from right), on September 21, 2011

Gordon was a senior foreign policy advisor for Barack Obama's 2008 presidential campaign.

In the Obama administration, Gordon served as Assistant Secretary of State for European and Eurasian Affairs under Secretary of State Hillary Clinton from May 2009 to March 2013.

On March 11, 2013, Gordon was appointed Special Assistant to the President and Coordinator for the Middle East, North Africa, and the Gulf Region at the NSC. According to the Daily Beast, Gordon did not have much experience with the Israeli–Palestinian conflict, but was appointed due to his experience in the federal bureaucracy.

=== Council on Foreign Relations ===
After he stepped down from the Obama administration, Gordon was one of the biggest boosters of the Iran nuclear deal. He has been described as associated with the progressive wing of the national security continuum.

Between the Obama and Biden administrations, Gordon worked as the Mary and David Boies senior fellow in U.S. foreign policy at the Council on Foreign Relations, where he focused on U.S. foreign policy, the Middle East, and Europe. He was also a Senior Adviser at Albright Stonebridge Group.

He joined the Council on Foreign Relations in April 2015 as a senior fellow focused on U.S. foreign and national security policy; U.S. policy in the Middle East; Israeli-Palestinian issues; Middle East regional issues; Europe and the EU; Russia; Turkey; nuclear weapons; intelligence; terrorism; and international economics.

=== Biden administration ===
During the 2020 Democratic Party presidential primaries, Gordon was a foreign policy advisor to Kamala Harris' campaign.

At the start of the Biden Administration, Gordon was named Deputy National Security Advisor to Vice President Harris. On March 21, 2022, Gordon succeeded Nancy McEldowney as National Security Advisor to the Vice President. During the Gaza war, Gordon took a high-profile trip to Israel and the West Bank, meeting with Israeli President Isaac Herzog and Palestinian President Mahmoud Abbas.

In August 2024, Gordon said that Kamala Harris did not support an arms embargo on Israel.

== Publications ==
Gordon has published articles in The New York Times, Washington Post, Politico, the Atlantic, Financial Times, Wall Street Journal, Foreign Affairs, Foreign Policy, Le Monde, and elsewhere.

- Philip H. Gordon, "What Was the War on Terror? A Quarter Century of Fear and Fantasy" (review of Peter Bergen, All the Presidents' Wars: Twenty-Five Years of America's War on Terror, Norton, 2026, 432 pp.), Foreign Affairs, vol. 105, no. 5 (September/October 2026), pp. 196–201. "According to Bergen's estimates, the wars in Iraq and Afghanistan cost the United States at least $4 trillion [p. 198] ($6 trillion, if military pensions are included). Some 7,000 U.S. service members lost their lives, alongside an estimated 8,000 contractors. Conservative estimates suggest that 200,000 Iraqis were killed, as were tens of thousands of Afghans. ... The United States ... had to respond militarily to the worst attack on its soil in history [9/11]. But it did not have to pursue a sprawling, global war on terror that went well beyond destroying terrorists who threatened the United States and instead set out to somehow eliminate terrorism as a political tool and transform the entire Middle East." (p. 199.)

He has also authored several books, including:

- Losing the Long Game: The False Promise of Regime Change in the Middle East, 2020
- Winning the Right War: The Path to Security for America and the World, 2008
- Winning Turkey: How America, Europe, And Turkey Can Revive A Fading Partnership (with Omer Taspinar), 2008
- History Strikes Back: How States, Nations, And Conflicts Are Shaping The Twenty-first Century, ed., (with Hubert Vedrine and Madeleine Albright), 2008
- Crescent of Crisis: US-European Strategy for the Middle East, ed., (with Ivo Daalder and Nicole Gnesotto), 2006
- Allies at War: The United States, Europe, and the Crisis Over Iraq (with Jeremy Shapiro), 2004
- The French Challenge: Adapting to Globalization (with Sophie Meunier), 2001
- Cold War Statesmen Confront the Bomb, ed. (with John Lewis Gaddis, Ernest R. May and Jonathan Rosenberg), 1999
- NATO's Transformation, ed., 1997
- France, Germany and the Western Alliance, 1995
- A Certain Idea of France, 1993

He has also translated two books: Nicolas Sarkozy's Testimony: France, Europe, and the World in the Twenty-First Century, 2007, and Hubert Vedrine's France in the Age of Globalization, 2001.

Government offices
Preceded by Daniel Fried	Assistant Secretary of State for European and Eurasian Affairs; May 15, 2009 – March 11, 2013	Succeeded by Victoria Nuland
Preceded by Stephen M. Pinkos	Deputy National Security Advisor to the Vice President of the United States; January 20, 2021 – present	Incumbent
