= Angelika Kausche =

German-born American politician

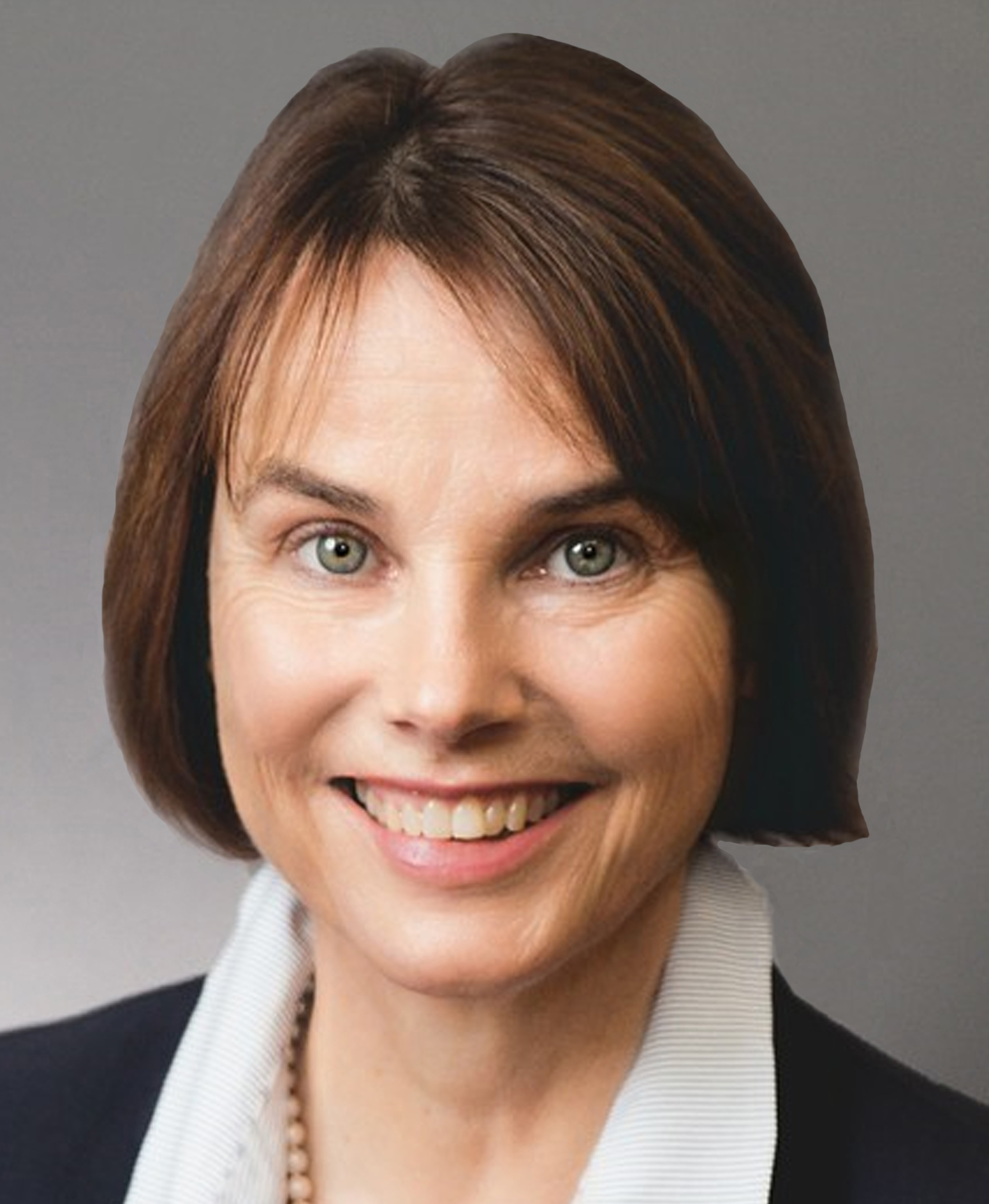
- Official portrait, 2014

Member of the Georgia House of Representatives from the 50th district
- In office January 14, 2019 – January 9, 2023
- Preceded by: Brad Raffensperger
- Succeeded by: Michelle Au

Personal details
- Born: October 7, 1962 (age 63)
- Party: Democratic

Angelika Kausche (born October 7, 1962) is an American politician. She is a former member of the Georgia House of Representatives, affiliated with the Democratic Party, who represented Georgia House District 50 from 2019 to 2023.

== Personal life and education ==
Kausche is a German-American, born in Wuppertal, who relocated to the United States in 1997 and became a naturalized American citizen in 2011. She possesses a Masters of Business Administration from the University of Trier in Germany and a Masters in Organizational Communication from Western Michigan University.

Kausche first moved to Georgia in 2015 and is involved in volunteer work as well as her local Rotary Club in Johns Creek, Georgia.

== Career ==
Before immigrating to the United States, Kausche had worked in German banks for several years. In the years following her relocation, Kausche taught as an adjunct professor at various colleges in both Michigan and North Carolina. Kausche is now retired.

Kausche was first elected to the Georgia House of Representatives in 2018 in District 50 after an atypical campaign that saw Kausche flip her hitherto Republican district, winning by 317 votes. Kausche served on the Environment, Higher Education, and Small Business Development committees in the Georgia House.

Georgia House of Representatives
Preceded by Brad Raffensperger	Member of the Georgia House of Representatives from the 50th district 2019–2023	Succeeded by Michelle Au
