= Michelle Au =

American anesthesiologist and politician

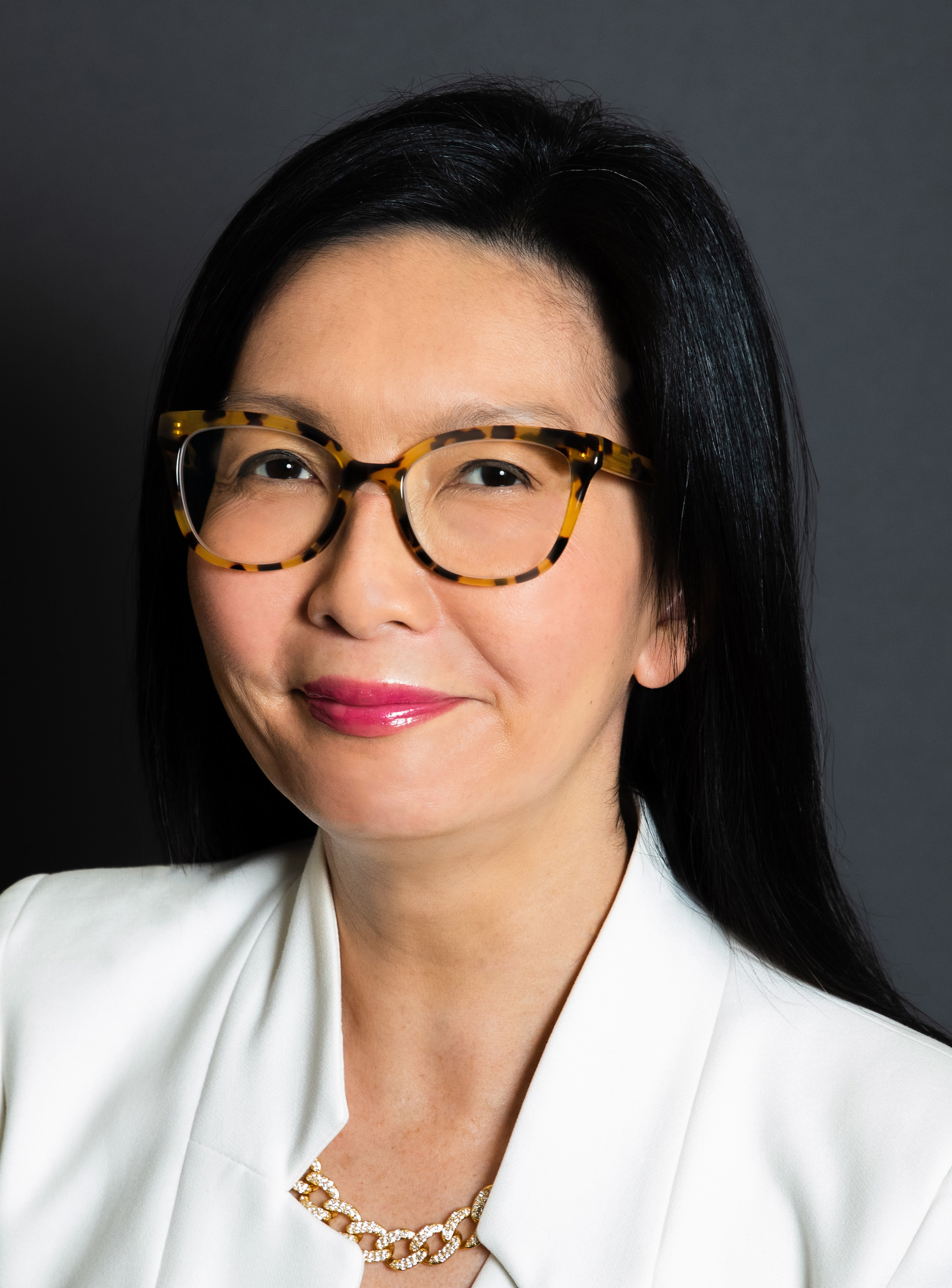
- Official portrait, 2023

Member of the Georgia House of Representatives from the 50th district
- Incumbent
- Assumed office January 9, 2023
- Preceded by: Angelika Kausche

Member of the Georgia State Senate from the 48th district
- In office January 11, 2021 – January 9, 2023
- Preceded by: Zahra Karinshak
- Succeeded by: Shawn Still

Personal details
- Born: June 21, 1978 (age 48) New York City, U.S.
- Party: Democratic
- Children: 3
- Education: Wellesley College (B.A.); Columbia University (M.D., M.P.H.)

Chinese name
- Traditional Chinese: 歐曉瑜
- Simplified Chinese: 欧晓瑜
Transcriptions
Standard Mandarin
- Hanyu Pinyin: Ōu Xiǎoyú

Michelle Hsiao Au (Chinese: 欧晓瑜; pinyin: Ōu Xiǎoyú) is an American anesthesiologist and politician from Georgia. Au has served in the Georgia House of Representatives as a Democratic member for District 50 since 2023. Au previously represented the 48th District in the Georgia State Senate and was the first Asian American elected to that body. In December 2021, Au announced that she would not be running for re-election in Senate District 48 but instead would run for election in Georgia state House District 50 due to the Republican controlled state legislature re-drawing her district.

In 2011, Au published her book This Won't Hurt a Bit (and Other White Lies), which according to a review, "exposes the reality of medical education and the irony within the practice of medicine that physicians are human, but our patients want us to be more".

== Early life and education ==
Au was born to Chinese-American immigrants, both physicians, in New York City. She graduated from Hunter College High School in 1995, from Wellesley College in 1999 with a B.A. in Psychobiology, M.D. in 2003 and a Master of Public Health in 2019 from Columbia University.

== Electoral history ==
Democratic primary for Georgia State Senate District 48, 2020
Party	Candidate	Votes	%
Democratic	Michelle Au	16,238	77.64
Democratic	Josh Uddin	4,677	22.36
Total votes		20,915	100

General election Georgia State Senate District 48, 2020
Party	Candidate	Votes	%
Democratic	Michelle Au	49,184	56.18%
Republican	Matt Reeves	38,358	43.82%
Total votes		87,542	100.0%
Democratic hold			

Georgia House of Representatives District 50, 2022
Party	Candidate	Votes	%
Democratic	Michelle Au	11,989	54
Republican	Narender Reddy	10,198	46
Total votes		22,187	100

== Personal life ==
Au lives in Duluth, Georgia, and has three children.
