= Georgia's 50th House of Representatives district =

State district in Georgia, USA

Georgia's 50th State House of Representatives district
Representative
Michelle Au; D–Johns Creek
- Demographics: 50.1% White; 10.2% Black; 6.9% Hispanic; 29.5% Asian
- Population: 58,754

District 50 elects one member of the Georgia House of Representatives. It contains parts of Fulton County.

== Members ==
- Mark Burkhalter (2005–2011)
- Lynne Riley (2011–2014)
- Brad Raffensperger (2015–2019)
- Angelika Kausche (2019–2023)
- Michelle Au (since 2023)
