= Charles P. Ries (diplomat) =

American diplomat and businessman

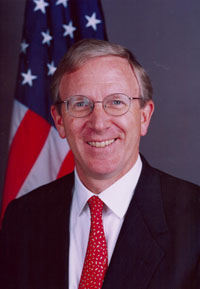
U.S. Ambassador Charles P. Ries

Charles P. Ries (born 1951) is the vice president, International at the Rand Corporation.

== Diplomatic career ==
Ries joined the foreign service in 1975. He was the United States Minister for Economic Affairs and Coordinator for Economic Transition in Iraq, serving at American Embassy Baghdad.

Ries served as U.S. Ambassador to Greece (2004–07) and Principal Deputy Assistant Secretary of State for European Affairs (2000–04), in the latter capacity overseeing the U.S.-European Union relationship, economics, energy, and public diplomacy.

Ries had earlier assignments in London, Brussels, Ankara and the Santo Domingo. He was detailed to USTR as Deputy Assistant U.S. Trade Representative for North American Affairs and was a member of the North American Free Trade Agreement (NAFTA) negotiating team. At State Department headquarters, Ries worked on international energy and G-7/G-8 Summits, among other issues.

== Education ==
He attended Asheville School. Ries holds B.A. and M.A. degrees from the Johns Hopkins University. Ries is the recipient of several State Department honors, including the Cordell Hull Award for Senior Economic Officers, the Distinguished Honor Award, the Presidential Meritorious Service Award, and multiple Superior Honor Awards.

He was the first recipient of the Rockwell Schnabel Award for U.S.-EU Relations in 2004. For his service in Iraq, he received the Department of the Army's Outstanding Civilian Service Award. He is a member of the Academy of American Diplomacy. Following his diplomatic career, Ries joined RAND in 2009 as a Senior Fellow, later serving as Vice President, International from 2012 to 2020. His research at RAND has focused on economic development, transatlantic relations, the Middle East, and disaster recovery, and he is a co-author of RAND studies including one on the costs of the Israeli-Palestinian conflict and another on reconstructing Ukraine.

== Personal ==
Ries is married to Marcie Berman Ries, the former U.S. ambassador to Bulgaria.

== See also ==
- Embassy of the United States in Baghdad
- Embassy of the United States in Athens
- United States Ambassador to Greece

Diplomatic posts
Preceded by Thomas J. Miller	United States Ambassador to Greece; 2004–2007	Succeeded by Daniel V. Speckhard
Preceded by -	Minister for Economic Affairs and Coordinator for Economic Transition in Iraq; 2007–present	Incumbent
