= Anthony F. Godfrey =

American diplomat

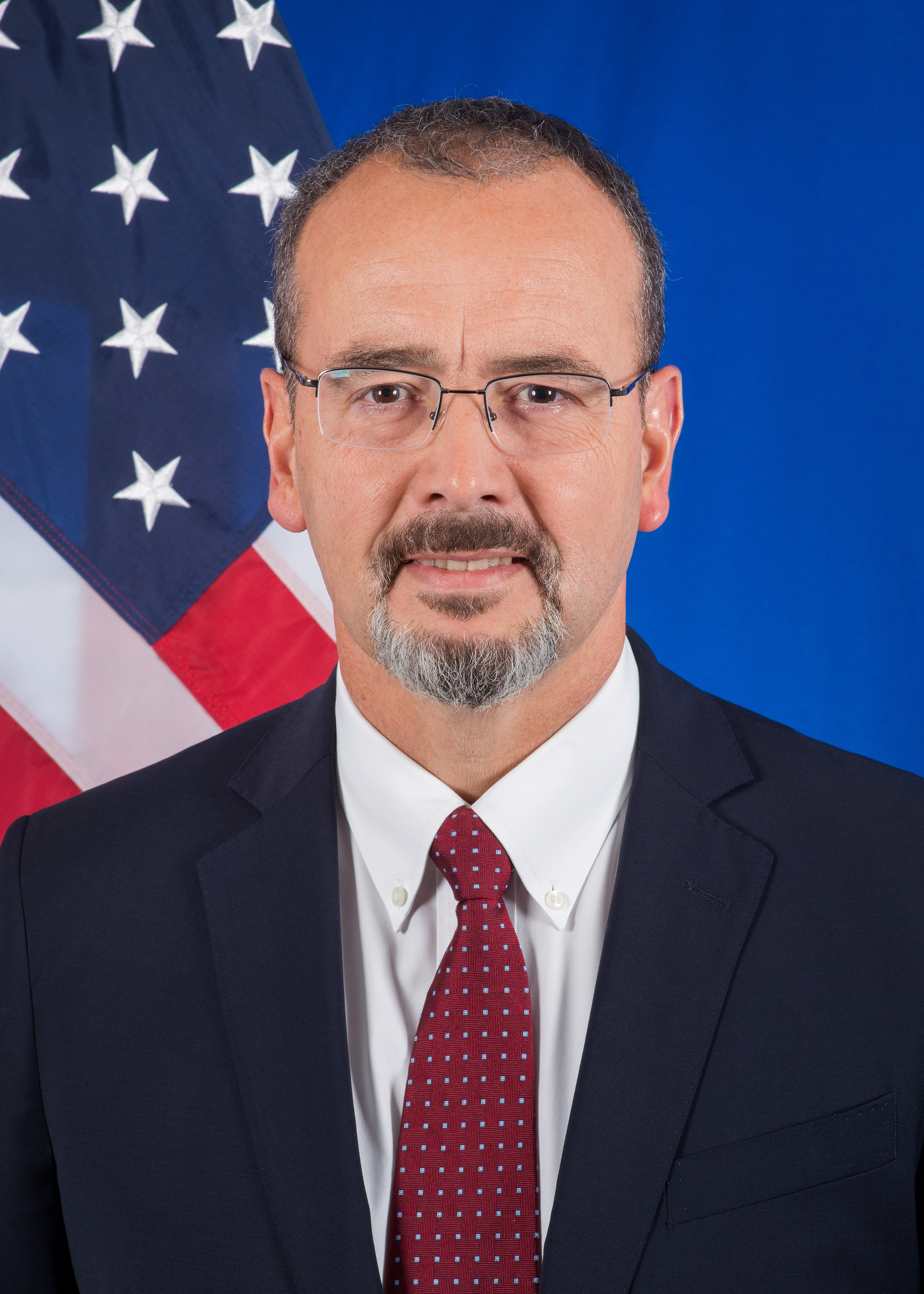
- Official portrait, 2019

United States Ambassador to Serbia
- In office October 24, 2019 – February 12, 2022
- President: Donald Trump; Joe Biden
- Preceded by: Kyle Randolph Scott
- Succeeded by: Christopher R. Hill

Personal details
- Education: University of California (BA)

Anthony Francis Godfrey is an American career diplomat who served as the United States Ambassador to Serbia from 2019 until 2022.

== Education ==
Godfrey earned a Bachelor of Arts from the University of California at Davis.

== Career ==
At the time of his appointment as Ambassador, Godfrey had worked for the Foreign Service for almost thirty years. Before that, he served 12 years in the United States Navy.

For four years, prior to his appointment as Ambassador, he was a Political Minister Counselor and then a Deputy Chief of Mission at the U.S. Embassy in Moscow, Russia.

=== United States Ambassador to Serbia ===
On June 18, 2019, President Trump announced his intent to nominate Godfrey as the next Ambassador to Serbia. On June 24, 2019, his nomination was sent to the United States Senate. His nomination was confirmed by voice vote on September 26, 2019.

Godfrey retired from the U.S. Foreign Service in 2022, and now resides in Richmond, Virginia, where he has been teaching political science and leadership classes at VCU and the University of Richmond.

== Personal life ==
Godfrey speaks Russian, Serbian and Turkish.

== See also ==
- List of current ambassadors of the United States

Diplomatic posts
Preceded by Kyle Randolph Scott	U.S. Ambassador to Serbia; 2019–2022	Succeeded by Christopher R. Hill
