= Jan Jones (Georgia politician) =

American politician (born 1958)

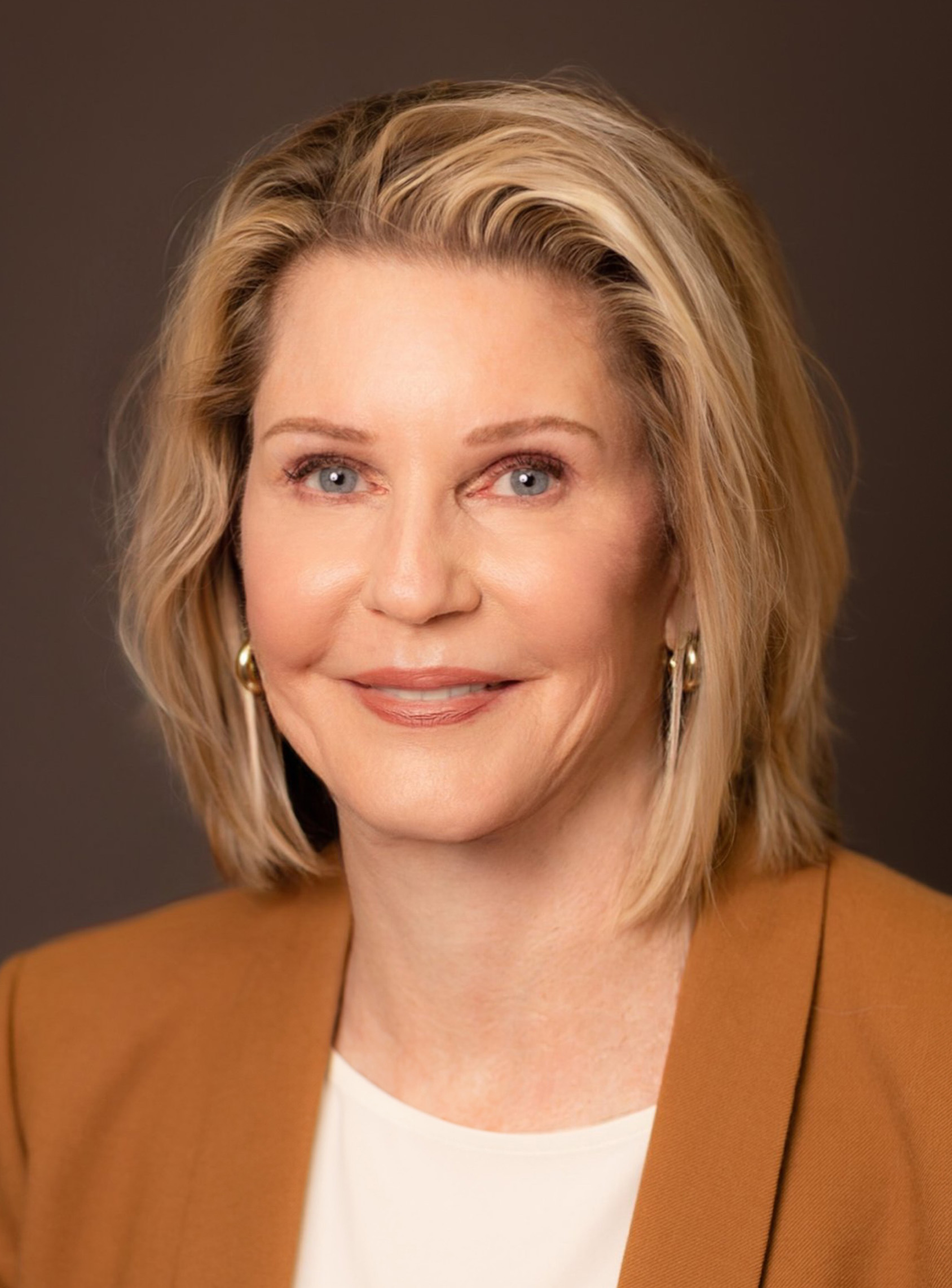
- Official portrait, 2025

Speaker pro tempore of the Georgia House of Representatives
- Incumbent
- Assumed office January 11, 2010
- Preceded by: Mark Burkhalter

Speaker of the Georgia House of Representatives
- Acting
- In office November 16, 2022 – January 9, 2023
- Preceded by: David Ralston
- Succeeded by: Jon G. Burns

Member of the Georgia House of Representatives
- Incumbent
- Assumed office January 13, 2003
- Preceded by: Roger Hines
- Constituency: 38th district (2003–2005); 46th district (2005–2013); 47th district (2013–present)

Personal details
- Born: January 28, 1958 (age 68) Warner Robins, Georgia, U.S.
- Party: Republican
- Spouse: Kalin Jones
- Children: 4
- Education: University of Georgia (BA); Georgia State University (MBA)

Jan Slaughter Jones (born January 28, 1958) is an American politician in Georgia. A Republican, she has been a member of the Georgia House of Representatives since 2003, and was acting Speaker of the House from November 2022 to January 2023 following the death of former Speaker David Ralston. Jones serves as Speaker pro tempore of the House, a position she has held continuously since 2010 with the exception of her brief stint as acting Speaker. She is the state representative for Georgia's 47th House district, which covers some of the northern Atlanta suburbs, including parts of Milton, Roswell, Alpharetta, Mountain Park, and unincorporated Cherokee County.

On February 19, 2026, Jones announced she would not seek reelection for another term.

== Early life, education, and family ==
Jones was born in Warner Robins, Georgia. She is the granddaughter of two Laurens County, Georgia farmers and the daughter of a career soldier. She graduated with a B.A. in journalism from the University of Georgia. She later received an M.B.A. from Georgia State University. She is a former marketing manager for HBO.

== Georgia House of Representatives ==
=== Early tenure (2003–2009) ===
Jones was elected to the Georgia House of Representatives in 2002, taking office on January 13, 2003. In the 2005-2006 legislative session, she briefly served as the House Republican Majority Whip.

Jones is currently the state representative for Georgia's 47th House district, which covers some of the northern Atlanta suburbs (including parts of North Fulton County, such as Milton, Mountain Park, Alpharetta, and Roswell, as well as a portion of unincorporated eastern Cherokee County).

Jones' district became more heavily Republican in 2021, during the redistricting cycle; starting in the 2022 elections, her district took in a part of Cherokee County, shifting her district from one that voted 53.4% for Donald Trump in 2020 to one that voted 57% for Trump in 2020.

=== Speaker pro tempore (2010–present) ===
In January 2010, Jones was elected speaker pro tempore of the Georgia House (the second-highest leadership position in the chamber), becoming the first female to serve in the role and the highest-ranking woman in Georgia legislative history.

In 2014, Jones supported legislation to block Medicaid expansion in Georgia.

In 2016, Governor Nathan Deal and others encouraged Jones to seek the Republican nomination in the 2017 Georgia's 6th congressional district special election, for the U.S. House of Representatives seat vacated by Tom Price. Jones declined to run.

In 2019, after Republican U.S. Senator Johnny Isakson announced his intent to resign from the Senate, Jones was one of many well-known Republican applicants who sought an appointment to fill the vacancy (others included Price, Jack Kingston, and Randy Evans). Governor Brian Kemp ultimately chose Kelly Loeffler to fill the vacancy.

In early 2020, Jones opposed legislation to ban books in schools deemed "obscene"; the proposal targeted various works that address issues of race and gender, such as Toni Morrison's novel Beloved and Maia Kobabe's memoir and graphic novel Gender Queer. In late 2021, however, Jones reversed positions, backing an "anti-obscenity" bill similar to the one she had previously opposed.

After Joe Biden won the 2020 presidential election and Trump refused to concede while making false claims of fraud, Jones supported a controversial effort to change Georgia's election laws. Critics deemed the Georgia election legislation an effort to restrict voting rights (see Republican efforts to restrict voting following the 2020 presidential election). Jones was later involved in efforts to initiate a performance review of local election officials in Fulton County (a heavily Democratic county), which could later be used to remove the election officials. Trump and his Republican allies targeted Fulton County when they were making false claims of fraud.

In November 2022, Georgia House Speaker David Ralston died in office. Jones was temporarily elevated to speaker following Ralston's death, becoming the first female speaker of the Georgia House. Jones decided not to seek to run in the November 2022 Republican caucus election for speaker; she chose, along with the rest of Ralston's Republican leadership team, to support Majority Leader Jon G. Burns's bid for speaker. Jones instead chose to seek reelection as president pro tem.

Jones is a longtime school voucher proponent, and was leading figure supporting a push in the 2023 legislative session to give $6,500 per student in state-funded vouchers for private school tuition and homeschooling; students zoned for public schools scoring in the lowest 25% would be eligible. The proposed program would cost $110 million, if 1% of Georgia public school students participated. The bill was supported by conservative advocacy groups, such as the right-wing groups such as Americans for Prosperity and opposed by public education groups and teachers' organizations. The bill stalled in March 2023, with the House voting 95–70 to table it; an amended version of the bill also later failed, 85–89, in the final hours of the session, after more than a dozen Republican representatives (mostly representing rural districts) joined almost all Democrats in voting against it.

== Personal life ==
Jones and her husband, Kalin, have four children. They reside in Milton, Georgia.

Georgia House of Representatives
Preceded by Mark Burkhalter	Speaker pro tempore of the Georgia House of Representatives; 2010–present	Incumbent
Political offices
Preceded by David Ralston	Speaker of the Georgia House of Representatives; Acting; 2022–2023	Succeeded by Jon G. Burns
