= Sophie Meunier =

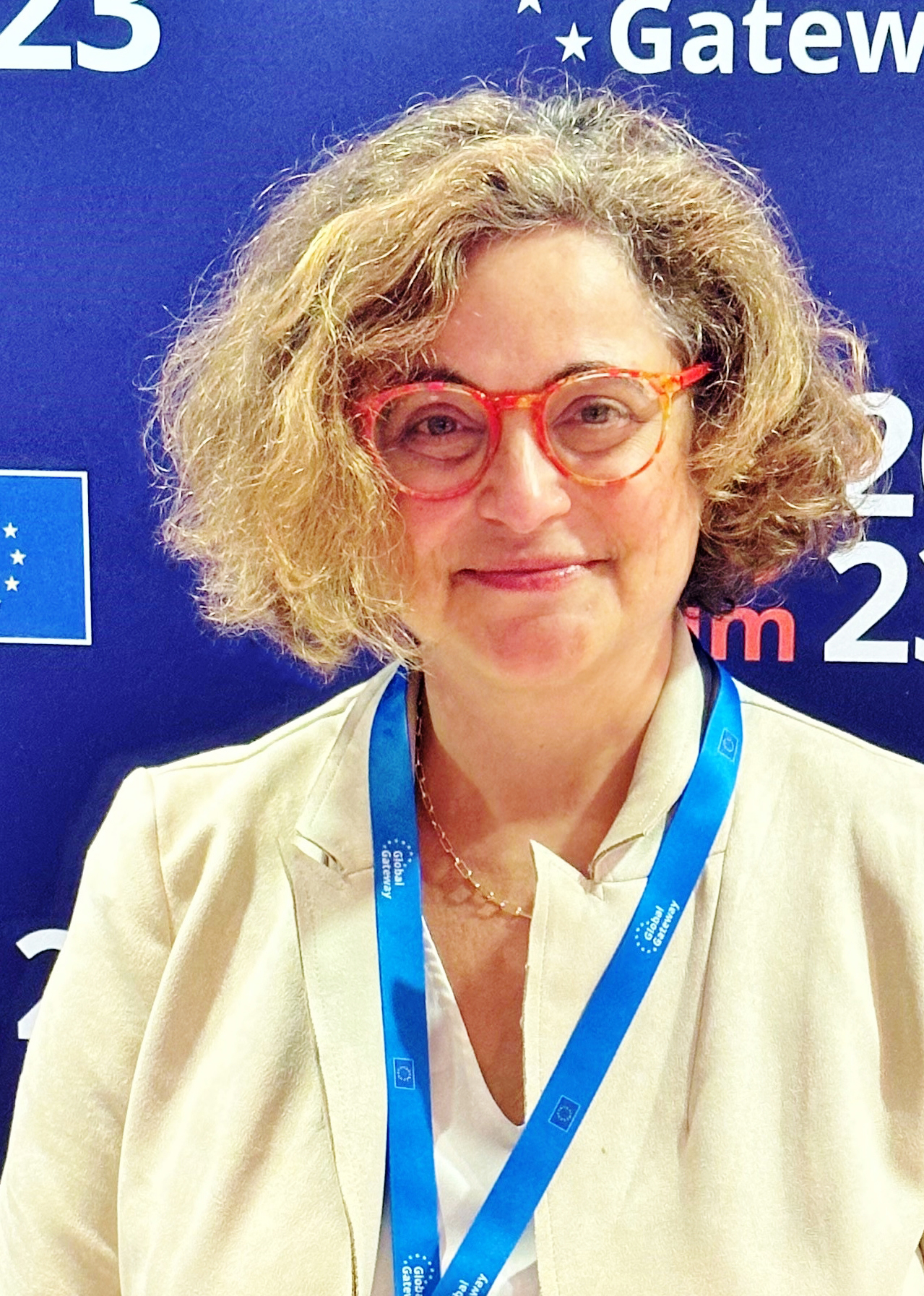
- Meunier at the Global Gateway Forum in Brussels, October 2023

Academic background
- Education: Sciences Po, Massachusetts Institute of Technology
- Doctoral advisors: Suzanne Berger

Academic work
- Discipline: International Political Economy European Politics
- Institutions: Princeton University
- Awards: Chevalier des Palmes Academiques (France)

Sophie Meunier (born c. 1967 in Paris, France) is a senior research scholar in Public and International Affairs at Princeton University's School of Public and International Affairs (formerly known as the Woodrow Wilson School). She is the Director of Princeton's Program in Contemporary European Politics and Society and the Co-director of the European Union Program at Princeton, which she founded with Andrew Moravcsik. She also served as Acting Director of the Liechtenstein Institute on Self-Determination at Princeton (2023-2024). She was elected Chair of the European Union Studies Association, the world's premier scholarly association for the study of the European Union and the process of European integration (2023-2024). A Franco-American political scientist, she is an expert in European integration, the politics of European trade and investment policy, and the politics of anti-Americanism. Meunier is a faculty fellow in Yeh College at Princeton University.

Her first book, The French Challenge: Adapting to Globalization (Brookings Institution Press, 2001), co-written with Philip H. Gordon, won the 2002 France-Ameriques Book Award. Paul Krugman called it "a terrific book, especially for those of us who were wondering how France manages to thrive in the very global economy it denounces". Her second book, Trading Voices: The European Union in International Commercial Negotiations (Princeton University Press, 2005), has been praised by Pascal Lamy as "the first authoritative study of the trade policy of the European Union".

She has published many articles in academic journals, as well as in magazines and newspapers such as Foreign Affairs, Foreign Policy, Le Monde, Le Figaro, and The Huffington Post.

Meunier has been actively involved in promoting the study of the European Union in the United States. She has been secretary of the European Union Studies Association and vice-chair (2021-2023), before being Chair of EUSA (2023-2024). She is a former elected member of the executive committee of the Council for European Studies, the leading academic organization for the study of Europe, with a membership of more than 100 institutions and 1,000 individuals. Meunier was an elected officer of the American Political Science Association's European Politics and Society section (2010-2013). She was the co-chair of the 2010 Conference Program Committee of the Council for European Studies in Montreal, April 15–17, 2010. She was also elected on the board of the European Union Studies Association (2003–2007) and was secretary of this association (2005–2007).

She received her BA in political science from Sciences Po Paris and her Ph.D. in political science from M.I.T. She was named Chevalier de l'Ordre des Palmes Academiques by the French government in 2011 and currently resides in Princeton, New Jersey.

== Research contributions ==
Meunier's theoretical and empirical research studies the politics of globalization, notably the interactions between European integration and globalization and their impact on international institutions and domestic politics. She has analyzed both how economic globalization challenges politics in the European Union and how European countries have reacted to, adapted to, and in turn shaped globalization. Her most well-known contributions are the following:

- The development of trade and investment policy in the European Union
- France and globalization
- The politics of international regime complexity
- Failing Forward as a pattern of European integration
- The politics of hosting Chinese direct investment in Europe
- The politics and regulation of investment screening mechanisms
- Geoeconomics and the European Union

== Books ==
- The French Challenge: Adapting to Globalization (with Philip H. Gordon). Brookings Institution Press, 2001.
- Le Nouveau defi francais: la France face a la mondialisation (avec Philip H. Gordon). Editions Odile Jacob, 2002.
- Trading Voices: The European Union in International Commercial Negotiations. Princeton University Press, 2005.
- L'Union fait la force: l'Europe dans les négociations commerciales internationales. Presses de Sciences Po, 2005.
- Making History: European Integration and Institutional Change at Fifty (edited with Kathleen McNamara). Oxford University Press, 2007.
- Europe and the Management of Globalization (edited with Wade Jacoby). Routledge, 2010.
- Developments in French Politics 5 (edited with Alistair Cole and Vincent Tiberj). Palgrave, 2013.
- The Politics of Representation in the Global Age (edited with Peter Hall, Wade Jacoby and Jonah Levy). Cambridge University Press, 2014.
- Speaking with a Single Voice: The EU as an Effective Actor in Global Governance? (edited with Eugenia da Conceicao-Heldt). Routledge, 2014.
- Developments in French Politics 6 (edited with Helen Drake, Alistair Cole, and Vincent Tiberj). McMillan Red Globe Press, 2021.

== Awards and honors ==
- Named Chevalier de l'Ordre des Palmes Academiques by the French government in 2011
- Book The French Challenge: Adapting to Globalization (Brookings Institution Press, 2001), co-written with Philip H. Gordon, won the 2002 France-Ameriques Book Award.

== Personal life ==
- Meunier is married to Princeton economist Yacine Ait-Sahalia. They have two children.
- Meunier is the pressed flower artist Flore Organic Botanics. She has held several exhibits in Princeton, NJ.
