= Michael David Kirby =

American diplomat

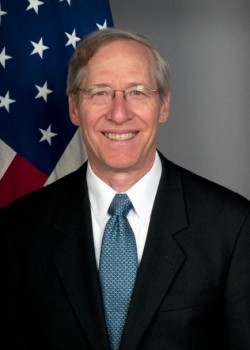
- Official portrait, 2012

United States Ambassador to Serbia
- In office September 19, 2012 – January 29, 2016
- President: Barack Obama
- Preceded by: Mary Burce Warlick
- Succeeded by: Kyle Randolph Scott

United States Ambassador to Moldova
- In office May 30, 2006 – June 25, 2008
- President: George W. Bush
- Preceded by: Heather M. Hodges
- Succeeded by: Asif J. Chaudhry

Personal details
- Born: 1953 (age 72–73) United States
- Education: University of Pennsylvania; University of North Carolina, Chapel Hill

Michael David Kirby (born 1953) is a U.S. diplomat and a former U.S. Ambassador to Moldova and Serbia.

== Education ==
Kirby earned a Bachelor of Arts in history from the University of Pennsylvania in 1976 and studied at the University of North Carolina, Chapel Hill.

== Career ==
Kirby joined the United States Foreign Service as a Consular Officer in 1979. His various assignments included Copenhagen, Denmark, Dar es Salaam, Tanzania, and Georgetown, Guyana. He also served as a desk officer in the Office of Caribbean Affairs in the Bureau of Western Hemisphere Affairs.

Kirby served as consul at the Consulate General in Kraków, Poland from 1988 to 1991, and as regional consular officer at the Consulate General in Frankfurt, Germany from 1996 to 1998, supervising consular operations at U.S. embassies in the countries of the former Soviet Union except Russia.

Returning stateside, he served as director of the Office of Intelligence Coordination in the Bureau of Intelligence and Research at the State Department from 1999 to 2001. Back overseas, Kirby was consul general at the embassy in Warsaw from 2001 to 2004, and as Consul General in the U.S. embassy in Seoul.

In March 2006, President George W. Bush nominated Kirby to be U.S. Ambassador to Moldova. Kirby presented his credentials as Ambassador to Moldova on September 21, 2006.

On June 14, 2012, President Barack Obama nominated Kirby to be U.S. Ambassador to Serbia. Kirby testified before the Senate Foreign Relations Committee the following month, and assumed the post on September 19, 2012.

== Personal life ==
Kirby is a resident of Virginia. He is married to Sara Powelson Kirby and has two daughters – Katherine and Elizabeth.

Diplomatic posts
Preceded by Mary Burce Warlick	U.S. Ambassador to Serbia; September 19, 2012–January 29, 2016	Succeeded by Kyle Randolph Scott
Preceded by Heather M. Hodges	U.S. Ambassador to Moldova; May 30, 2006–June 25, 2008	Succeeded by Asif J. Chaudhry
