= Ginny Ehrhart =

American politician (born 1964)

Representative Ginny Ehrhart
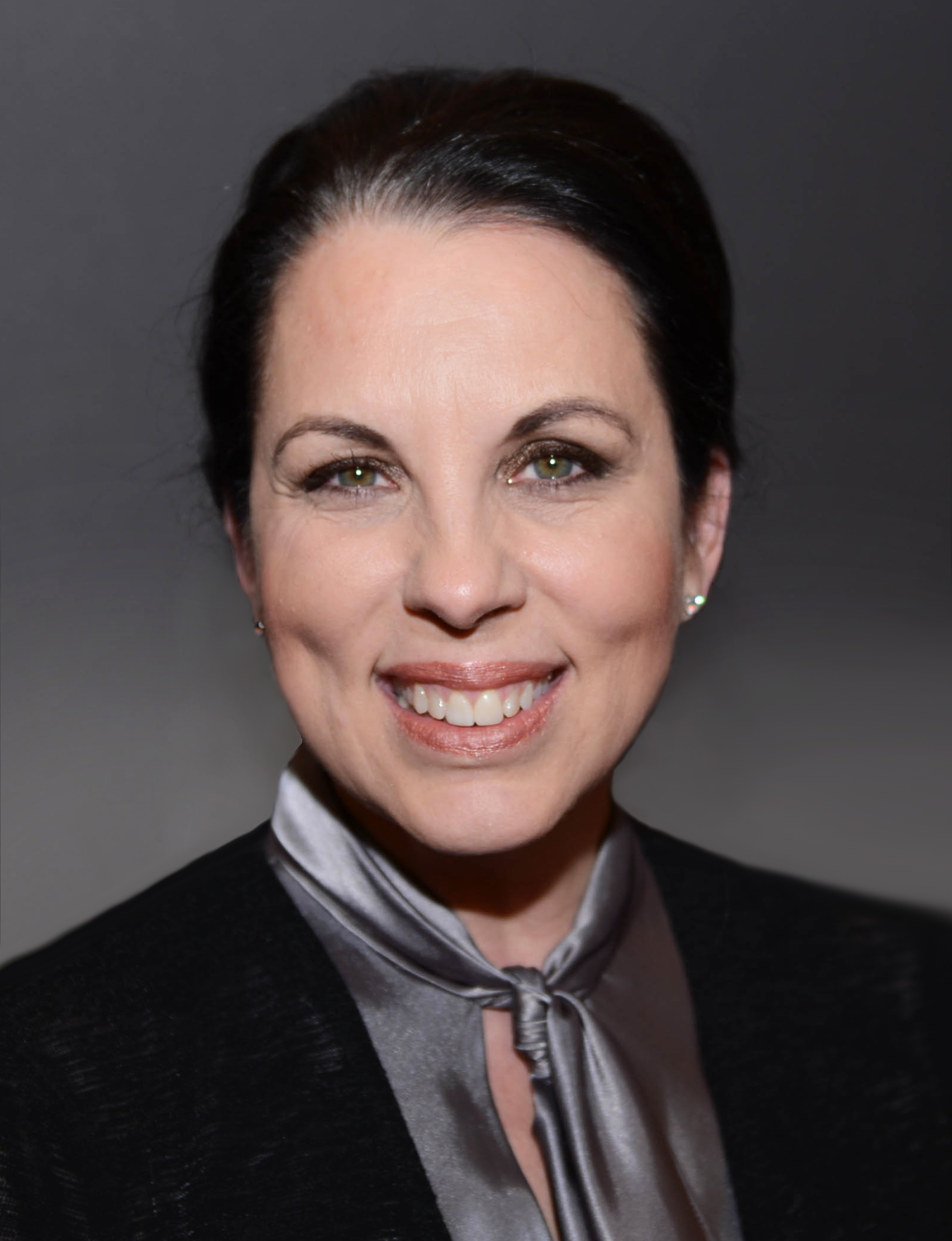
- Official portrait, 2025

Member of the Georgia House of Representatives from the 36th district
- Incumbent
- Assumed office January 2019
- Preceded by: Earl Ehrhart

Personal details
- Born: December 10, 1964 (age 61)
- Party: Republican
- Education: Auburn University
- Website: State House website Campaign website

Virginia Wahlbom Ehrhart (born December 10, 1964) is an American politician representing the 36th House District in Georgia. Prior to serving in the House, she had worked as a chef and talk show host. Her husband, Earl Ehrhart, is the former representative for this district. Ginny announced her candidacy immediately following her husband's announcement of retirement. She ran against Tom Gray in the Republican primary, winning 51.4% of the vote, and Jen Slipakoff in the general election. She is against gun control, and supports the Religious Freedom Restoration Act. She was criticized in October 2018 for stating that transgender individuals "shouldn't receive [special rights] whether they identify 'as a man or a moose'".
