= Marcie Berman Ries =

American diplomat (born 1950)

Marcie Ries
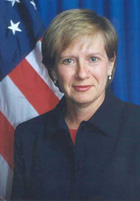

United States Ambassador to Bulgaria
- In office October 1, 2012 – July 28, 2015
- President: Barack Obama
- Preceded by: James Warlick
- Succeeded by: Eric S. Rubin

11th United States Ambassador to Albania
- In office October 30, 2004 – June 16, 2007
- President: George W. Bush
- Preceded by: James Jeffrey
- Succeeded by: John Withers

Chief of Mission of the U.S. Office in Pristina
- In office 20 July 2003 – 28 July 2004
- President: George W. Bush
- Preceded by: Reno Harnish
- Succeeded by: Philip Goldberg

Personal details
- Born: August 25, 1950 (age 76) Boston, Massachusetts, U.S.
- Spouse: Charles Ries
- Education: Oberlin College; Johns Hopkins University

Marcie Berman Ries (born August 25, 1950) is an American diplomat who served as the United States Ambassador to Bulgaria and United States Ambassador to Albania.

== Career ==
A specialist in national security issues and arms control, Ries worked as the Director of the Office of United Nations Political Affairs from 2001 to 2003, and then served as the Chief of Mission in Pristina, Kosovo from 2003 to 2004.

In 2005, she was appointed American ambassador to Albania, and held that position until 2007. She left Albania in 2007 to become the Minister-Counselor for Political-Military Affairs in Iraq.

Upon returning to Washington, D.C., she became the Principal Deputy Assistant Secretary for European and Eurasian Affairs at the U.S. Department of State, and then went on to serve as the Deputy Assistant Secretary for Nuclear and Strategic Policy.

== Life ==
Ries obtained her Bachelor's from Oberlin College, and her master's degree from the School of Advanced International Studies at Johns Hopkins University. She is married to Charles P. Ries, a former U.S. ambassador to Greece.

Diplomatic posts
Preceded by Reno Harnish	Chief of Mission of the U.S. Office in Pristina; 2003–2004	Succeeded by Philip Goldberg
Preceded by James Jeffrey	United States Ambassador to Albania; 2004–2007	Succeeded by John Withers
Preceded by James Warlick	United States Ambassador to Bulgaria; 2012–2015	Succeeded by Roderick Moore; Acting
