= Cameron Munter =

American diplomat, academic and executive (born 1954)

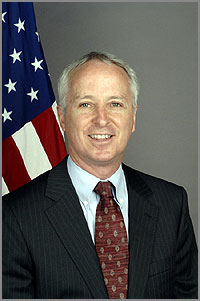
- Official portrait, 2007

United States Ambassador to Pakistan
- In office October 2010 – July 2012
- President: Barack Obama
- Preceded by: Anne W. Patterson
- Succeeded by: Richard Olson

United States Ambassador to Serbia
- In office August 15, 2007 – January 19, 2010
- President: George W. Bush; Barack Obama
- Preceded by: Michael C. Polt
- Succeeded by: Mary Burce Warlick

Personal details
- Born: 1954 (age 71–72) Walnut Creek, California, U.S.
- Spouse: Lenka Munter
- Education: Cornell University; Johns Hopkins University

Cameron Munter (born 1954) is a retired American diplomat, academic, and executive who now lives in Prague. As a career diplomat, he was ambassador to Pakistan and to Serbia, served two tours in Iraq, and spent years contributing, in foreign and domestic assignments, to the reunification of Europe after the end of the Cold War. After his retirement from the Foreign Service, he became president and CEO of the EastWest Institute in New York after teaching at Columbia and Pomona.

== Early life and education ==
Munter was born in California in 1954, graduating from Claremont High School in 1972. He attended Cornell University in Ithaca, New York, graduated magna cum laude in 1976 with a B.A.,^{[6]} and the universities of Freiburg and Marburg in Germany. He received a PhD in modern European history in 1983 from Johns Hopkins University in Baltimore, Maryland.

== Postgraduate work ==
Munter taught European history at the University of California, Los Angeles (1982–1984) and directed European Studies at the Twentieth Century Fund in New York (1984–1985) before joining the Foreign Service.

== Career ==
Munter served as U.S. Ambassador to Pakistan from 2010 to 2012, during the time of the raid in which Osama bin Laden was killed. He was U.S. Ambassador to Serbia from 2007 to 2009, during which time Kosovo declared its independence. A career Foreign Service Officer, Munter was Deputy Chief of Mission at the U.S. Embassy in Prague, Czech Republic, from August 2005 to June 2007. He volunteered to lead the first Provincial Reconstruction Team in Mosul, Iraq, from January through July 2006, and then returned to Prague. He came to Prague from Warsaw, Poland, where he served as Deputy Chief of Mission from 2002 to 2005.

Before these assignments, in Washington, D.C., Munter was Director for Central, Eastern, and Northern Europe at the National Security Council (1999–2001), Executive Assistant to the Counselor of the Department of State (1998–1999), Director of the Northern European Initiative (1998), and Chief of Staff in the NATO Enlargement Ratification Office (1997–1998).

He has also served overseas in Bonn, Germany (1995–1997), Prague (1992–1995), and Warsaw (1986–1988). His other domestic assignments include serving as Country Director for Czechoslovakia at the Department of State (1989–1991), Dean Rusk Fellow at Georgetown University's Institute for the Study of Diplomacy (1991), and Staff Assistant in the Bureau of European Affairs (1988–1989). He retired from the diplomatic service in 2012 and taught international relations at Columbia Law School (2012) and Pomona College (2013–2015) before coming to EWI.

== See also ==
- Ambassadors from the United States

Diplomatic posts
Preceded by Michael C. Polt	United States Ambassador to Serbia; 2007–2009	Succeeded by Mary Burce Warlick
Preceded by Anne W. Patterson	United States Ambassador to Pakistan; 2010–2012	Succeeded by Richard G. Olson
