= Asif J. Chaudhry =

American diplomat

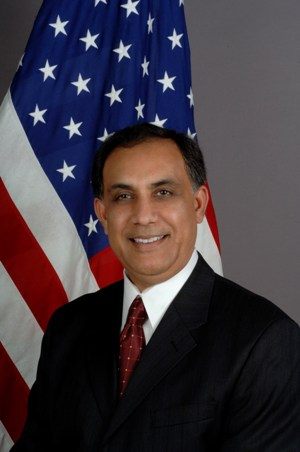
- Official portrait, 2008

United States Ambassador to Moldova
- In office September 24, 2008 – July 25, 2011
- President: George W. Bush; Barack Obama
- Preceded by: Michael D. Kirby
- Succeeded by: William H. Moser

Personal details
- Born: Asif J. Chaudhry; 1956 (age 69–70) Nindowal, Pakistan
- Spouse: Charla Chaudhry
- Children: 3
- Education: University of Punjab; Washington State University

Asif J. Chaudhry (born 1956) is a Pakistani-born American diplomat, who served as United States Ambassador to Moldova from 2008 to 2011.

== Education ==
Chaudhry completed his undergraduate work at the University of Punjab, his M.S. at the American University of Beirut, and his Ph.D. in Agricultural Economics at Washington State University.

== Career ==
Chaudhry began his career with the United States Department of State in 1988 as an agricultural economist, before becoming a FSO in 1990. In the 1990s Chaudhry served in positions in Poland and Russia, before becoming the minister counselor for agricultural affairs at the US Embassy in Cairo where he served from 2002 until 2006. Prior to his ambassadorial nomination, Chaudhry was the Deputy Administrator for the Office of Global Analysis at the Foreign Agricultural Service.

In 2008, he was nominated by George W. Bush to serve as the United States Ambassador to Moldova, which he did from 2008 until 2011. He was awarded the Order of Honour (Moldova) in 2011, shortly before termination of his mission. Since 2015, he has served as vice president for International Programs at Washington State University.

== See also ==
- List of ambassadors of the United States to Moldova
