= William H. Moser =

American diplomat (born 1954)

William Moser
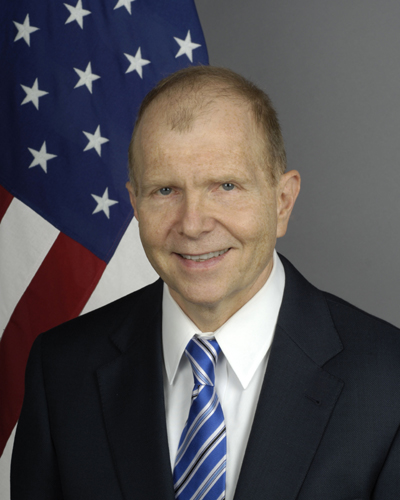
- Official portrait, 2011

Director of Bureau of Overseas Buildings Operations
- Incumbent
- Assumed office October 25, 2021
- President: Joe Biden
- Preceded by: Henry V. Jardine (acting)

United States Ambassador to Kazakhstan
- In office February 18, 2019 – October 25, 2021
- President: Donald Trump; Joe Biden
- Preceded by: George A. Krol
- Succeeded by: Daniel N. Rosenblum

United States Ambassador to Moldova
- In office September 21, 2011 – January 22, 2015
- Appointed by: Barack Obama
- Preceded by: Asif J. Chaudhry
- Succeeded by: James Pettit

Personal details
- Born: 1954 (age 71–72)
- Children: 3
- Education: University of North Carolina, Chapel Hill (BA)

William H. Moser (born November 1954) is an American diplomat who serves as the director of the Bureau of Overseas Buildings Operations.

== Education ==
Moser earned a Bachelor of Arts at the University of North Carolina, Chapel Hill and studied at Universitaet zu Koeln in Cologne, Germany.

== Career ==
He is a career member of the Senior Foreign Service, class of Minister-Counselor. He has served as an American diplomat since 1984. He has served at seven United States Missions overseas, including as United States Ambassador to Moldova from 2011 to 2015, and in senior leadership positions at the United States Department of State.

== Ambassadorships ==
=== Moldova ===
In 2011, President Barack Obama nominated Moser to be the United States Ambassador to Moldova. He served from September 21, 2011, to January 22, 2015.

=== Kazakhstan ===
On August 13, 2018, President Trump nominated Moser to be the United States Ambassador to Kazakhstan. His nomination was confirmed by voice vote in the United States Senate on January 2, 2019. He was sworn in on February 12, 2019. He presented his credentials on February 18, 2019. Moser previously served in Kazakhstan in 1996, in the then-Embassy in Almaty as a management officer and then as energy attaché.

== Personal life ==
Moser speaks Russian and German.

== See also ==
- List of ambassadors of the United States

Diplomatic posts
Preceded by Asif J. Chaudhry	United States Ambassador to Moldova; 2011–2015	Succeeded by James Pettit
Preceded by George A. Krol	United States Ambassador to Kazakhstan; 2019–2021	Succeeded by Daniel N. Rosenblum
