= Georgia's 36th House of Representatives district =

State district in Georgia, USA

Georgia's 36th State House of Representatives district
Representative
Ginny Ehrhart; R–Powder Springs
- Demographics: 63.5% White; 20.6% Black; 8.7% Hispanic; 4.5% Asian
- Population: 57,796

District 36 elects one member of the Georgia House of Representatives. It contains parts of Cobb County.

== Members ==
- Earl Ehrhart (1989–2019)
- Ginny Ehrhart (since 2019)
