= David Warlick =

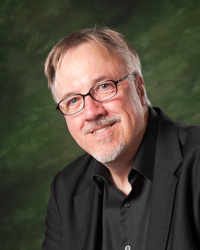
- Education: Western Carolina University, North Carolina State University
- Occupations: Author, teacher, software developer and public speaker
- Website: idave.us

David Warlick (born 1952 in Gastonia, North Carolina) is an educator, author, programmer, and public speaker. An early adopter and promoter of technology in the classroom, Warlick has taught and written about technology integration and school curriculum for more than 30 years. He has also developed instructional software and interactive Web sites to support teachers and students in using computers and the Internet for education.

In 2011, David Warlick was named one of the Ten Most Influential People in EdTech by Technology & Learning Magazine.

== Personal life ==
Warlick lives in Houston, North Carolina with his wife and business manager, Brenda Warlick, and their children, Ryann Warlick and Martin Warlick.

== Web development ==
- The InfoWeb (1994–1995) – Early version of the North Carolina Department of Public Instruction's Web site
- Current Awareness (1996–2003) (no longer active) – A partnership with NCDPI that digitized education-related publication clippings from the Department's professional library and made them available to teachers throughout the state via a web-based searchable database.
- PiNet Library / S.L.A.T.E. (2001–2009) – An early social bookmarking tool that enabled teachers to embed bookmarked websites into SLATES (web-based lessons and Webquests).
- Citation Machine (2000–present) – A citation generating tool developed initially for teachers, for citing their instructional materials and modeling appropriate use of intellectual property.
- Class Blogmeister (2005–present) – A blogging service designed for us by K-12 teachers and students. According to the site's statistics page, Class Blogmeister has hosted more than 300,000 teaching and student bloggers.

== Writing ==
Blog

David Warlick was an early education blogger (Edubloggers), beginning to write for 2¢ Worth in November 2004. His blog has earned a number of distinctions, including Edutopia's Best Blog for Educators in 2007.

Books

- Raw Materials for the Mind (4th Ed 2005)
- Digital Literacies for Learning (Chapter) (Facet Publishing 2006)
- Classroom Blogging: A Teacher's Guide to Blogs, Wikis, & Other Tools that are Shaping a New Information Landscape (2nd Ed 2007)
- Redefining Literacy 2.0 (2nd Ed Linworth Publishing 2008)
- What School Leaders Need to Know About Digital Technologies and Social Media (Chapter) (Jossey-Bass 2012)
- Cultivating Your Personal Learning Network (2nd Ed 2012)
- The Days & Nights of a Quiet Revolution (2018)

Select articles

- "The New Literacy" Scholastic.com (March/April 2005)
- "A Day in the Life of Web 2.0" Technology & Learning Magazine (October 2006)
- "Evaluating Internet-based Information: A Goals-based Approach" Meridian (June 1998)
- "A Future Fiction" Library Media Connection (March 2004)
- "Textbooks of the Future" Technology & Learning Magazine (May 2004)
