= Robert Rackmales =

American diplomat

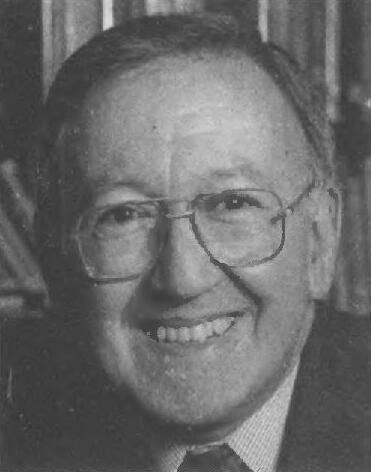
Rackmales c. 1993

Robert “Bob” Rackmales (born 1937, Baltimore, Maryland) was the American Chargé d'Affaires ad interim in the Socialist Federal Republic of Yugoslavia from May 1992 until July 1993 and has been teaching at Senior College for a decade.

Rackmales graduated from Johns Hopkins University in 1958. Rackmales was a Fulbright Scholar in Mainz before attending Harvard for a year. His paternal grandfather's nephew is the actor Kirk Douglas.

The U.S. shared normalized relations with Yugoslavia until 1992 when Slovenia, Croatia, Bosnia and Herzegovina, and Macedonia all seceded. The republics of Serbia and Montenegro declared a new Federal Republic of Yugoslavia (FRY) in April 1992. On May 21, 1992, the U.S. announced that it would not recognize the Federal Republic of Yugoslavia (FRY) as the successor state of the Socialist Federal Republic of Yugoslavia (SFRY), as Serbia and Montenegro claimed. The U.S. Ambassador was recalled from Belgrade, but the mission continued with a staff under the authority of a Chargé d’Affaires ad interim.

== Publications ==
- “GRACE UNDER PRESSURE:” JOHN PATON DAVIES Foreign Service Journal July/August 2008, page 46.
