= James B. Warlick Jr. =

American diplomat (born 1956)

James Warlick
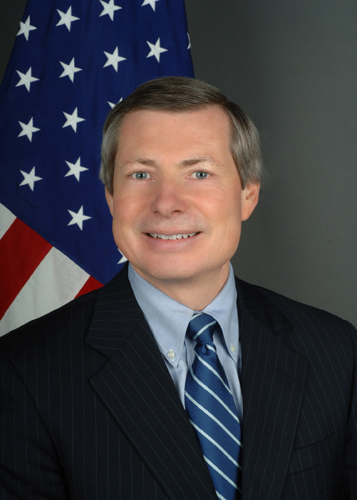

United States Ambassador to Bulgaria
- In office January 25, 2010 – September 14, 2012
- President: Barack Obama
- Preceded by: Nancy McEldowney
- Succeeded by: Marcie Berman Ries

Personal details
- Born: March 29, 1956 (age 70)
- Spouse: Mary Burce
- Education: Stanford University (BA); Wadham College, Oxford (MLitt); Tufts University (MA)

James Warlick (born March 29, 1956) is a US diplomat, and a former United States Ambassador to Bulgaria.

James Warlick, a career member of the Senior Foreign Service, was announced for nomination by President Barack Obama on October 1, 2009, confirmed on December 29, 2009, by the United States Senate, and sworn in on January 25, 2010, to be Ambassador Extraordinary and Plenipotentiary of the United States of America to the Republic of Bulgaria.

As of September 2013, he is the U.S. Co-chair of the Organization for Security and Cooperation in Europe (OSCE) Minsk Group, a position that comes to an end on December 31, 2016, according to a message, published by Warlick on his Twitter account.

== Biography ==
James Warlick earned a B.A. at Stanford University in 1977, holds a Master of Letters in Politics from Wadham College, Oxford, (1979) and a Master of Arts in Law and Diplomacy (1980) from the Fletcher School of Law and Diplomacy, Tufts University.

While Director of the United Nations Political Affairs in IO during 2003–2005, Ambassador Warlick also served as Principal Advisor to Ambassador L. Paul Bremer during January 2004 to July 2004 in Baghdad, Iraq.

Warlick was Director of the Office of European Security and Political Affairs, responsible for political-military and security issues for Europe and the former Soviet Union, including NATO, OSCE, and related arms control and nonproliferation policy issues (2005–2006).

Warlick served as Principal Deputy Assistant Secretary of State in the Bureau of International Organization Affairs (IO) from 2006 to 2009, with responsibility for all aspects of U.S. foreign policy at the United Nations and a number of other multilateral organizations.

Other assignments have included:

- Consul General, U.S. Embassy, Moscow;
- Director, for Germany, Austria and Switzerland in the European Affairs Bureau;
- Acting Minister-Counselor/ Deputy Counselor for Political Affairs,
- U.S. Embassy, Germany, Acting Minister-Counselor/ Deputy Counselor for Political Affairs
- Special Assistant to the Secretary of State;
- Operations Center Watch Officer; Consular Officer, Philippines; and Political Officer, Bangladesh.

Prior to his State Department service, Ambassador Warlick served as Deputy Representative of the Asia Foundation in Washington, DC and the Philippines; and he was a Foreign Affairs analyst in the Congressional Research Service at the Library of Congress.

In January 2017, Warlick joined the law firm Egorov Puginsky Afanasiev & Partners, working out of Washington, D.C. Warlik's LinkedIn page announced that he has left the Russian law firm in March 2022.

Diplomatic posts
| Preceded by Nancy McEldowney | United States Ambassador to Bulgaria; 2009–2012 | Succeeded by Marcie Berman Ries |
