= Mary B. Warlick =

American diplomat (born 1957)

Mary Warlick
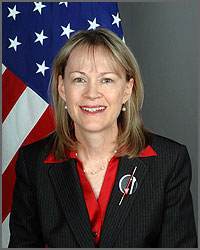
- Official portrait, 2010

United States Ambassador to Serbia
- In office January 28, 2010 – September 17, 2012
- President: Barack Obama
- Preceded by: Cameron Munter
- Succeeded by: Michael David Kirby

Personal details
- Born: 1957 (age 68–69) Australia
- Spouse: James B. Warlick Jr.
- Education: Valparaiso University (BA); Tufts University (MA)

Mary Burce Warlick (born 1957) is an Australian-born, American diplomat who was appointed the deputy executive director of the International Energy Agency in May 2021. A former United States career diplomat, she served as the United States ambassador to Serbia from January 2010 to September 2012, as the U.S. consul general in Melbourne, Australia from October 2012 to July 2014, as principal deputy assistant secretary in the Bureau of Energy Resources at the Department of State from August 2014 to September 2017, and as acting special envoy and coordinator for International Energy Affairs from January to September 2017.

== Early life ==
Warlick was born in 1957 to a Lutheran missionary family of Willard and Elinor Burce in the Territory of Papua and New Guinea, then part of Australia. She spent her high school years in Adelaide, South Australia. Warlick graduated from Valparaiso University in Valparaiso, Indiana with a B.A. in Political Science and Humanities in 1979, and from the Fletcher School of Law and Diplomacy at Tufts University with a M.A. in Law and Diplomacy in 1982.

== Political career ==
Warlick joined the U.S. Foreign Service in 1983. From 1983 through 1985, she worked as a Consular Officer at the U.S. Embassy in Manila, Philippines; from 1985 to 1986 as Staff Assistant to the Director of the U.S. Foreign Service Institute; from 1986 to 1988, as an Economic Officer at the U.S. Embassy in Dhaka, Bangladesh; and from 1988 to 1990 as an Economic Officer at the U.S. Embassy in Manila. She then worked in the Office of Textile Negotiations from 1990 to 1992, and as a Senior Watch Officer in the State Department's Operations Center from 1992 to 1994. From 1994 to 1998 she served as Economic Officer and Global Affairs Counselor in Bonn, Germany. From 1998 to 2000, Warlick served as the Director of the Office for Ukraine, Moldova and Belarus Affairs.

In August 2001 Warlick assumed a new position at the U.S. Embassy in Moscow, Russia where she worked as Minister Counselor for Economic Affairs until July 2004. She travelled throughout Russia working on many issues including trade, investment, energy and Russia's accession to the World Trade Organization. Upon her return to the United States, she served as Director of the Office of Russian Affairs at the State Department from 2004 to 2007 and in August 2007 was appointed Special Assistant to President George W. Bush and Senior Director for Russia at National Security Council. In 2008, Warlick assumed a new role at the U.S. Department of Defense, where she served as the Acting Deputy Assistant Secretary of Defense for European and NATO Policy and Acting Deputy Assistant Secretary of Defense for Russia, Ukraine and Eurasia Policy.

On September 24, 2009, Warlick was appointed U.S. Ambassador to Serbia by President Obama. On December 24, 2009 Warlick's appointment to Belgrade was confirmed by the Senate. She is married to James B. Warlick Jr. who was also confirmed as the United States Ambassador to Bulgaria on the same day.

In October 2012, Ambassador Warlick was appointed U.S.Consul General in Melbourne, Australia where she served until July 2014. She assumed a new role in August 2014 as Principal Deputy Assistant Secretary in the State Department's Bureau of Energy Resources.

== Awards ==
Warlick has received multiple Meritorious and Superior Honor Awards from the Department of State. In 2006, she received the Secretary of State's Award for Public Outreach.

She has studied Russian, German, Serbian, and Bengali. The Warlicks have three children, Jamie, Jason and Jordan.
