= Earl Ehrhart =

American politician (born 1959)

Member of the Georgia House of Representatives from the 36th district
- In office January 11, 1989 – January 14, 2019
- Succeeded by: Ginny Ehrhart

Personal details
- Born: Earl Day Ehrhart; August 8, 1959 (age 67) Miami, Florida, U.S.
- Party: Republican
- Spouse: Ginny Ehrhart
- Education: University of Georgia (BA)

Earl Day Ehrhart (born August 8, 1959) is an American politician and businessman from the U.S. state of Georgia. From 1989 to 2019, he served as a Republican member of the Georgia House of Representatives representing District 36, which encompasses parts of western Cobb County.

== Early life and education ==
Born in Miami, Florida, Ehrhart has lived in Cobb since 1964 and resides in Powder Springs. He graduated from the University of Georgia with a Bachelor of Arts in political science in 1980. While there, he was a member of Pi Sigma Alpha the national political science honor society, as well as a member of Phi Kappa Psi fraternity.

== Career ==
Ehrhart was first elected to the Georgia House of Representatives in 1988 and served eight years as the Minority Whip.

He served as Chairman of the House Rules Committee until January 2010, and is a member of the Appropriations, Banks, and State Institutions committees.

In 2005, Ehrhart was elected as the National Chairman of American Legislative Exchange Council (ALEC). He is also a member of the National Republican Legislator Association.

In 1990, the National Federation of Independent Business named Ehrhart the "Guardian of Small Business", due to his work in Georgia. He also received the "Champion of the Free Enterprise System Award" from the Associated Builders and Contractors of Georgia. He also received awards from the Medical Association of Georgia, Kennesaw State University, The Twenty Second Air Force Reserve, and the Georgia Federation of Young Republicans.

In 2005, Ehrhart co-sponsored a bill that overhauled Georgia's child support guidelines. The bill (House Bill 221) was made law April 22, 2005.

In 2007, Ehrhart urged passage of a bill that would have legalized payday lending in Georgia. The Georgia legislature narrowly defeated the measure. In 2009, regulators withdrew the state charter Georgian Bank. Ehrhart was on the board of directors of this bank. The bank was founded in 2001 and became very profitable during the housing boom. However, it suffered losses when the real estate market collapsed.
