= John Brinckerhoff Jackson =

John Brinckerhoff Jackson may refer to:

- J. B. Jackson (1909–1996), artist
- John B. Jackson (1862–1920), diplomat
