= Horace G. Torbert Jr. =

American diplomat (1911–2008)

Horace Gates Torbert Jr. (October 7, 1911 – March 24, 2008), also known as Tully Torbert, was an American diplomat. A career Foreign Service Officer, he acted as Chargé d'Affaires ad interim to Hungary from February 1961 to December 1962, Ambassador Extraordinary and Plenipotentiary to Somalia (1963–1965) and Bulgaria (1970–1973).

Gates was born in Washington D.C. on October 7, 1911. He graduated from Yale University and Harvard Business School. He died on March 24, 2008, at the age of 96.

Diplomatic posts
Preceded by John M. McSweeney	United States Ambassador to Bulgaria; November 4, 1970 – January 23, 1973	Succeeded by Martin F. Herz
