= Raymond L. Garthoff =

American diplomat (1929–2024)

United States Ambassador to Bulgaria
- In office July 29, 1977 – October 9, 1979
- President: Jimmy Carter
- Preceded by: Martin F. Herz
- Succeeded by: Jack Richard Perry

Personal details
- Born: March 26, 1929 Cairo, Egypt
- Died: November 7, 2024 (aged 95)
- Profession: Diplomat, Career Ambassador

Raymond Leonard Garthoff (March 26, 1929 – December 7, 2024) was an American politician and senior fellow at the Brookings Institution and a specialist on arms control, intelligence, the Cold War, NATO, and the former Soviet Union. He was a U.S. Ambassador to Bulgaria and advised the U.S. State Department on treaties.

== Life and career ==
In 1948, he received his B.A. from Princeton University. In 1949, he received his M.A. from Yale. From 1950 to 1957, he was a Soviet analyst for RAND Corporation. In 1951, he received his PhD from Yale. From 1957 to 1961, he was a CIA Office of National Estimates (ONE) analyst. In the early 1960s, he was a special assistant in the State Department. Beginning in 1969, he was involved in the Strategic Arms Limitation Talks, as executive secretary of the U.S. delegation. In September 1970, he became a deputy director of the State Department's Bureau of Political-Military Affairs. As he later described it, he was "the regular Department representative on the verification panel working group, as it was called, the main working group for the SALT [I] preparations."

In the 1970s, he was a senior Foreign Service inspector. From 1980 to 1994, he was a senior fellow at the Brookings Institution. He is the author of numerous scholarly papers, books, and has been featured in PBS documentaries.

He is well known for his disagreement with the 1976 characterization of Team B and Richard Pipes of Soviet nuclear doctrine. Garthoff died at a retirement community in Mitchellville, on December 7, 2024, at the age of 95.

== Works ==
=== Articles ===
- "Putin's Policies Promise Measured Change". Los Angeles Times. 2 April 2000. Archived from the original on 17 February 2012.
- Garthoff, Raymond L. (1978). "On Estimating and Imputing Intentions". International Security. 2 (3): 22–32.
- Garthoff, R. L. (1977). Negotiating Salt. The Wilson Quarterly (1976-), 1(5), 76–85. Read online

=== Books ===
- Reflections on the Cuban Missile Crisis: Revised To Include New Revelations from Soviet & Cuban Sources (Revised) by Raymond Garthoff (Paperback - Jun 2, 1989)
- The Great Transition: American-Soviet Relations and the End of the Cold War. Raymond L. Garthoff The Brookings Institution, 1994, 834 pp. covers 1981 to 1991
- Détente and Confrontation: American-Soviet Relations from Nixon to Reagan by Raymond L. Garthoff (1985; revised 2nd ed. 1994) covers 1970-1980 online free to borrow
- Deterrence and the Revolution in Soviet Military Doctrine by Raymond L. Garthoff (1990)
- Soviet Military Policy; A Historical Analysis by Raymond L. Garthoff (Hardcover - 1966)
- Soviet Strategy in the Nuclear Age *Praeger Pubs. in Russian History and World Communism, No. 71 by Raymond L. Garthoff (Hardcover - 1958)
- Policy Versus the Law: The Reinterpretation of the Abm Treaty by Raymond L. Garthoff (Paperback - Oct 1987)
- Sino-Soviet Military Relations by Raymond L. Garthoff (Unknown Binding - 1966)
- A Journey Through the Cold War: A Memoir of Containment and Coexistence by Raymond L. Garthoff (Hardcover - Jun 30, 2001)
- Assessing the Adversary: Estimates by the Eisenhower Administration of Soviet Intentions and Capabilities (Brookings Occasional Papers) by Raymond L. Garthoff (Paperback - Sep 1991)
- Soviet Image of Future War by Raymond Garthoff (Hardcover - Jun 1959)
- Intelligence Assessment and Policymaking: A Decision Point in the Kennedy Administration by Raymond L. Garthoff (Paperback - Jul 1984)
- Science and Technology in Contemporary War **Praeger Pubs. in Russian History and World Communism, No.74** by MG G.I. (Raymond L. Garthoff, Translator/Annotator) Pokrovsky (Hardcover - 1959)
- The tragedy of Hungary: A revolution won and lost (P-984) by Raymond L Garthoff (Unknown Binding - 1956)
- The Soviet High Command and General Staff (P-684) by Raymond L Garthoff (Unknown Binding - 1955
- The new Soviet leadership Santa Monica, Calif. RAND Corp. by Raymond L Garthoff (Unknown Binding - 1953)

== External sources ==
- GWU NSA Archive INTERVIEW WITH RAYMOND GARTHOFF-29.8.1996 accessed Dec 15, 2007
- Гартхофф Рэймонд Л. // Иванян Э. А. Энциклопедия российско-американских отношений. XVIII-XX века. — Москва: Международные отношения, 2001. — 696 с. — ISBN 5-7133-1045-0.

Diplomatic posts
| Preceded by Martin F. Herz | United States Ambassador to Bulgaria; 1977–1979 | Succeeded by Jack Richard Perry |
