= Dolní Hbity =

- Municipality
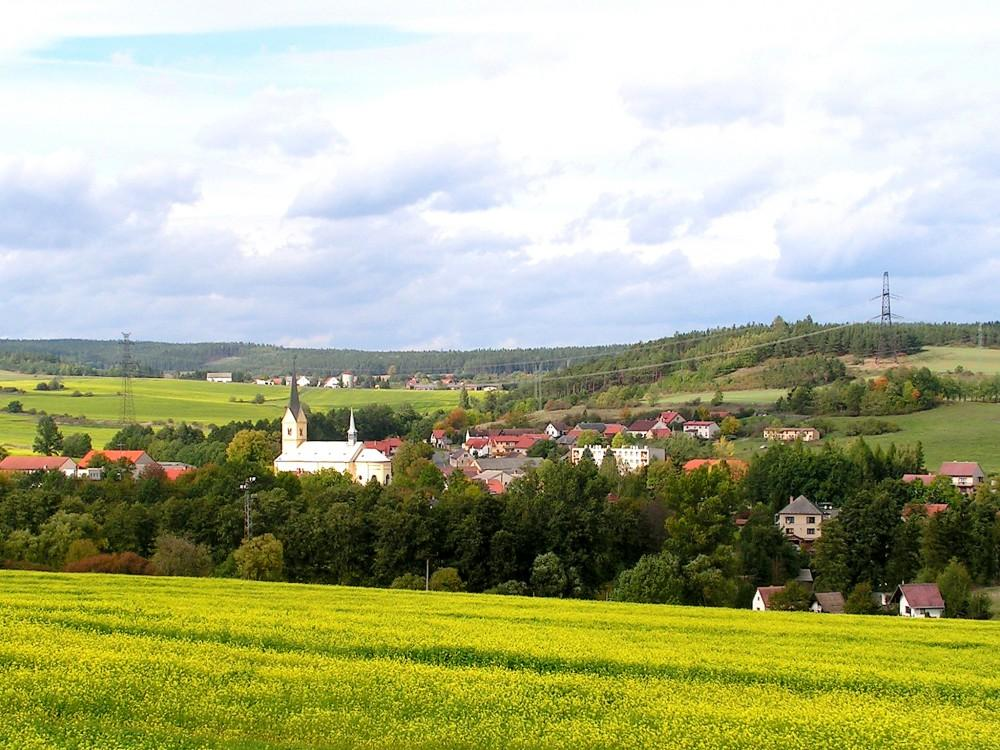
- View from the south

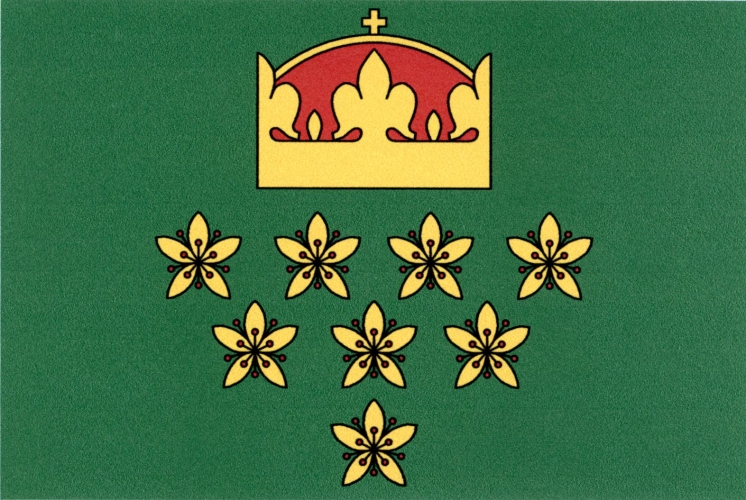
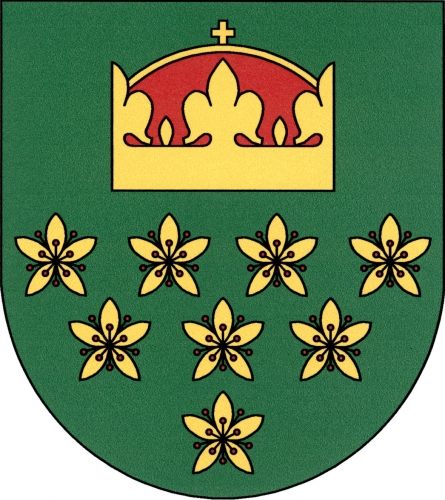
- Flag Coat of arms

- Location in the Czech Republic
- Coordinates: 49°39′27″N 14°10′12″E
- Country: Czech Republic
- Region: Central Bohemian
- District: Příbram
- First mentioned: 1325

Area
  - Total: 25.69 km^{2} (9.92 sq mi)
- Elevation: 399 m (1,309 ft)

Population (2026-01-01)
  - Total: 912
  - Density: 35.5/km^{2} (91.9/sq mi)
- Time zone: UTC+1 (CET)
  - Summer (DST): UTC+2 (CEST)
- Postal codes: 262 62, 262 63
- Website: www.dolni-hbity.cz

Dolní Hbity is a municipality and village in Příbram District in the Central Bohemian Region of the Czech Republic. It has about 900 inhabitants.

== Administrative division ==
Dolní Hbity consists of eight municipal parts (in brackets population according to the 2021 census):

- Dolní Hbity (301)
- Horní Líšnice (30)
- Jelence (215)
- Káciň (119)
- Kaliště (15)
- Luhy (138)
- Nepřejov (45)
- Třtí (42)

== Etymology ==
The initial name of Dolní Hbity was Tbity. This name was derived from the old Czech adjective tbitý, meaning 'attentive', 'conscientious'. The inhabitants of the village were designated that way, but it could have been an ironic designation. From the second half of the 15th century, two villages were distinguished: Dolní ('lower') Hbity and Horní ('upper') Hbity (today a part of Jablonná).

== Geography ==
Dolní Hbity is located about 12 kilometres (7 mi) east of Příbram and 43 km (27 mi) southwest of Prague. It lies in the Benešov Uplands. The highest point is the hill Bukovec at 562 m (1,844 ft) above sea level. The stream Vápenický potok flows through the municipality.

== History ==
The first written mention of Dolní Hbity is from 1325, when King John of Bohemia sold the area to Lord Heřman of Miličín.

== Demographics ==
Historical population

Year	Pop.	±%
1869	1,642	—
1880	1,772	+7.9%
1890	1,746	−1.5%
1900	1,715	−1.8%
1910	1,652	−3.7%

Year	Pop.	±%
1921	1,556	−5.8%
1930	1,421	−8.7%
1950	1,103	−22.4%
1961	1,054	−4.4%
1970	1,019	−3.3%

Year	Pop.	±%
1980	946	−7.2%
1991	852	−9.9%
2001	823	−3.4%
2011	848	+3.0%
2021	905	+6.7%

Source: Censuses

== Transport ==
There are no railways or major roads passing through the municipality.

== Sights ==
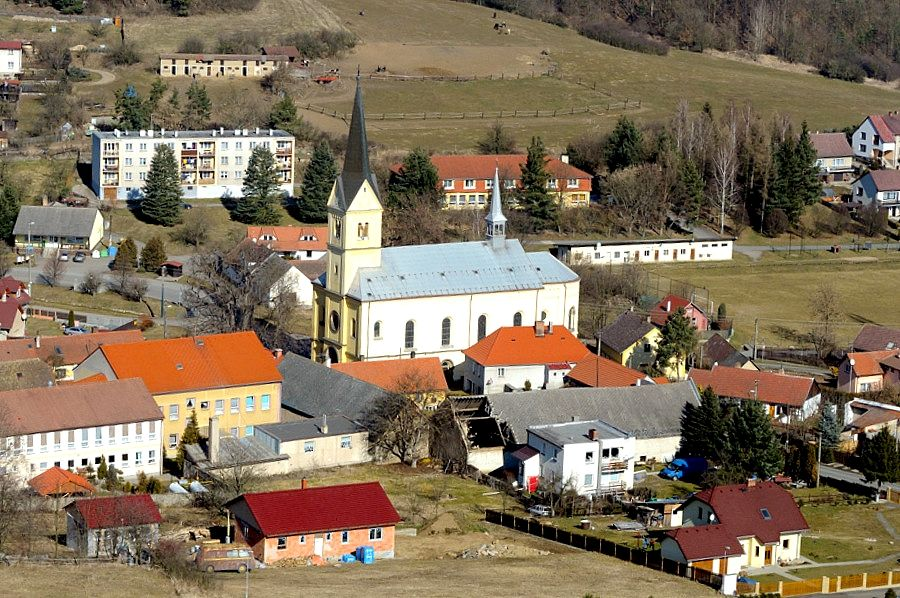
Church of Saint John the Baptist

The most important monument of Dolní Hbity is the Church of Saint John the Baptist. It was built in the Neo-Romanesque style in 1868–1872 on the site of an older church from the second half of the 13th century.

== Notable people ==
- Charles J. Vopicka (1857–1935), Czech-American businessman and diplomat
