= David P. Calleo =

American political scientist (1934–2023)

- Born: David Patrick Calleo; July 19, 1934; Binghamton, New York, U.S.
- Died: June 15, 2023 (aged 88); Washington, D.C., U.S.
- Organization(s): Yale Political Union; Manuscript Society
- Spouse: Avis T. Bohlen
- Awards: Guggenheim Fellowship (1966); Berlin Prize (2005)

Academic background
- Education: Yale University

Academic work
- Discipline: Political science

David Patrick Calleo (July 19, 1934 – June 15, 2023) was an American political scientist, based at the Johns Hopkins University School of Advanced International Studies, where he held the titles of Dean Acheson Professor and University Professor. He served as director of the SAIS European Studies program for more than 40 years, from 1968 through May 2012. Calleo was a noted American theorist on Europe and its future.

== Early life ==
David Patrick Calleo was born in Binghamton, New York, on July 19, 1934. He earned undergraduate and doctoral degrees at Yale University, where he also served as President of the Yale Political Union and was a member of Manuscript Society as an undergraduate.

== Career ==
In his 1978 book The German Problem Reconsidered, Calleo offered a revisionist picture of Imperial Germany, in which he argued that the German Empire was not an aggressive power, but instead a victim of the sanctimoniousness and envy of other powers. Calleo wrote that "Imperial Germany was not uniquely aggressive, only uniquely inconvenient. Whatever faults and ambitions the Germans had were amply shared by the other major nations of the modern era". Calleo asserted that because of Germany's location in Central Europe, the Germans "lacked the space to work out their abundant vitality", and so because of Germany's geographical location, the drive and vitality of German society made them a threat to others". Calleo claimed that "Modern Germany was born encircled". Calleo claimed that there were many similarities between Imperial Germany and the United States, as both were late-comer powers characterized by huge economic growth and a certain arrogance caused by their success. Calleo argued that the key differences were that the Americans had a "continental backyard" to expand into, whereas the Germans did not. Moreover, the Germans "...lacked the Anglo-Saxon talent for cant". In this way, Calleo claimed that all of the disasters of 20th-century Germany were caused by Germany's geographical circumstances".

In 2001 Calleo published a new landmark book, Rethinking Europe's Future, where he comes back to his 1964 theme. Calleo has consistently argued that Europe will turn protectionist in the face of China and other countries in order to preserve the national welfare state. A theorist of the decline of American power, Calleo sees Europe as an ally to the US but also as a friendly counterweight. A critic of America's "unipolar folly", Calleo fears the consequences of continued belief in a unipolar world, a dysfunctional view he believes America can correct with the help of its European allies. Calleo had also been an early critic of America's "twin deficits" with such books as "The Imperious Economy" and "The Bankrupting of America".

From 2011 he also acted as Advisor to Fair Observer, an online magazine covering global issues from a plurality of perspectives, on editorial issues with a focus on Europe and the U.S.

== Personal life and death ==
David Calleo was married to Avis T. Bohlen, former ambassador and arms control expert. She is the daughter of Charles E. Bohlen, who was Ambassador to the Soviet Union.

Calleo owned a former farm house on the Italian island of Elba, where he spent his summers researching and hosting friends.

Calleo died on June 15, 2023, at the age of 88.

== Selected works ==
- Follies of Power: America's Unipolar Fantasy (Cambridge University Press, 2009). ISBN 0-521-76767-9
- Rethinking Europe's Future (Princeton University Press, 2001). ISBN 0-691-11367-X
- The Bankrupting of America (Morrow, 1992). ISBN 0-688-05162-6
- Beyond American Hegemony: The Future of the Western Alliance (Twentieth Century, 1987)
- The Imperious Economy (Harvard University Press, 1982). ISBN 0-674-44522-8
- The German Problem Reconsidered (Cambridge University Press, 1978)
- America and the World Political Economy (Indiana University Press, 1973)
- The Atlantic Fantasy (Johns Hopkins Press, 1970)
- Britain's Future (Hodder & Stoughton, 1968)
- The American Political System (Dufour Editions, 1968)
- Coleridge and the Idea of the Modern State (Yale University Press, 1966)
- Europe's Future: The Grand Alternatives (W. W. Norton & Company, 1965). ISBN 0-393-00406-6
