= John B. Jackson =

American lawyer and diplomat (1862–1920)

John Brinckerhoff Jackson
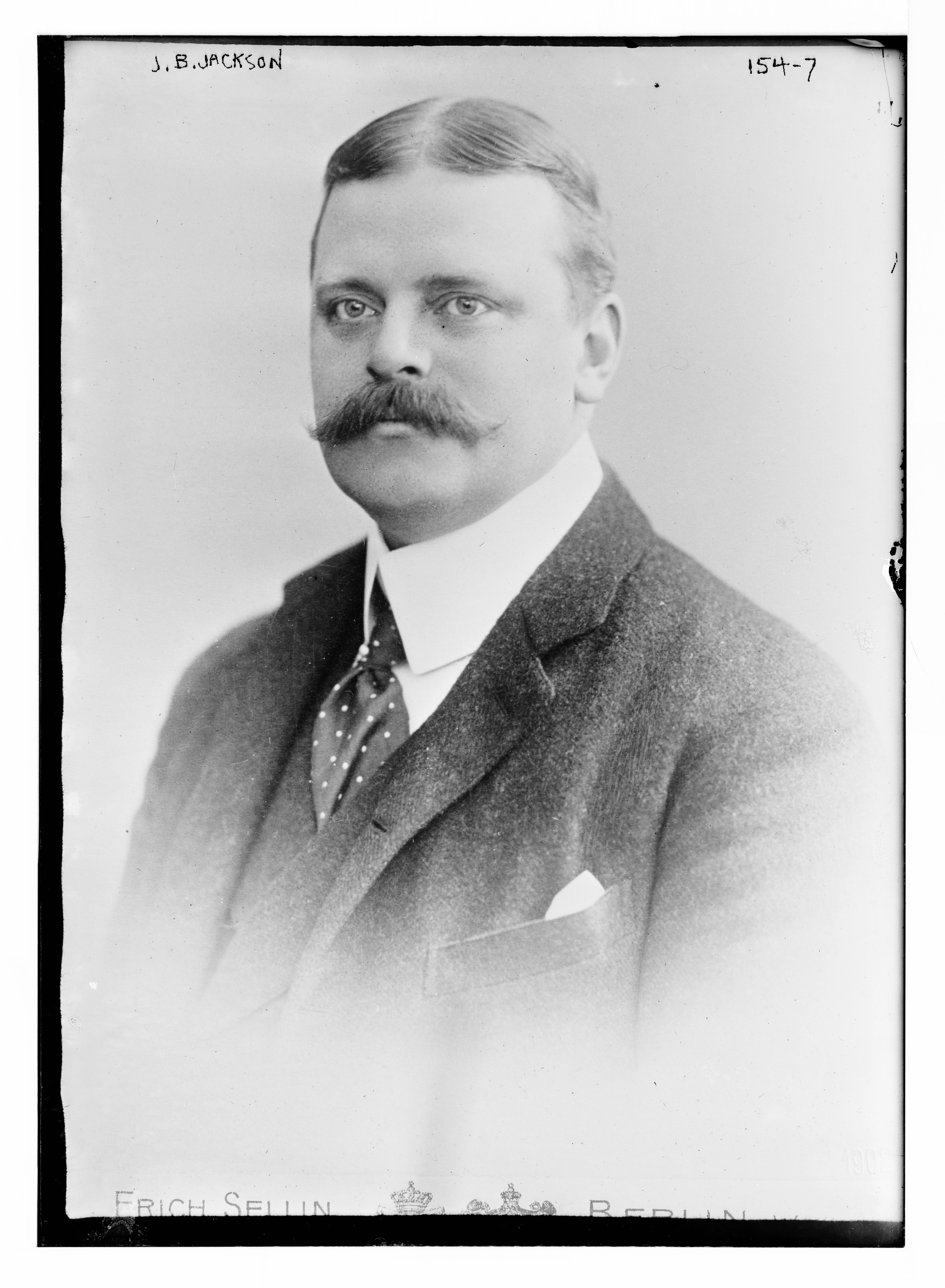

8th and 13th U.S. Minister to Romania
- In office December 24, 1911 – October 28, 1913
- President: William Howard Taft; Woodrow Wilson
- Preceded by: John R. Carter
- Succeeded by: Charles J. Vopicka
- In office April 7, 1903 – July 25, 1905
- President: Theodore Roosevelt
- Preceded by: Henry L. Wilson
- Succeeded by: John W. Riddle

2nd and 3rd U.S. Minister to Bulgaria
- In office February 1, 1912 – October 18, 1913
- President: William Howard Taft; Woodrow Wilson
- Preceded by: John R. Carter
- Succeeded by: Charles J. Vopicka
- In office September 19, 1903 – June 4, 1907
- President: Theodore Roosevelt
- Preceded by: Charles M. Dickinson
- Succeeded by: Horace G. Knowles

8th and 12th U.S. Minister to Serbia
- In office January 16, 1912 – October 15, 1913
- President: William Howard Taft; Woodrow Wilson
- Preceded by: John R. Carter
- Succeeded by: Charles J. Vopicka
- In office May 9, 1904 – July 13, 1905
- President: Theodore Roosevelt
- Preceded by: Charles Spencer Francis
- Succeeded by: John W. Riddle

3rd U.S. Minister to Cuba
- In office March 22, 1910 – October 27, 1911
- President: William Howard Taft
- Preceded by: Edwin V. Morgan
- Succeeded by: Arthur M. Beaupre

13th U.S. Minister to Persia
- In office December 12, 1907 – July 3, 1909
- President: Theodore Roosevelt
- Preceded by: Richmond Pearson
- Succeeded by: Charles Wells Russell Jr.

13th U.S. Minister to Greece
- In office December 24, 1902 – October 19, 1907
- President: Theodore Roosevelt
- Preceded by: Charles Spencer Francis
- Succeeded by: Richmond Pearson

1st U.S. Minister to Montenegro
- In office October 30, 1905 – 27 October 1907
- President: Theodore Roosevelt
- Preceded by: Position created
- Succeeded by: Richmond Pearson

Personal details
- Born: August 19, 1862 Newark, New Jersey
- Died: December 20, 1920 (aged 58) Montreux, Switzerland
- Spouse: Florence Baird (m. 1886)
- Parent(s): Frederick Wolcott Jackson; Nannie Nye Jackson
- Education: United States Naval Academy

John Brinckerhoff Jackson (August 19, 1862 – December 20, 1920) was an American lawyer and diplomat who spent most of his career in Europe and the Middle East.

== Early life ==
Jackson was born in Newark, New Jersey on August 19, 1862, to one of the most widely known families in New Jersey. He was a son of Nannie (née Nye) Jackson (1835–1905) and Frederick Wolcott Jackson (1833–1904). Among his siblings was Philip Nye Jackson, Esq., William Fessenden Jackson, the Rev. Frederick Wolcott Jackson Jr., Charles Huntington Jackson, Esq., Elizabeth Wolcott Jackson, Nina Fessenden (née Jackson) Abeel, Olivia Wolcott Jackson, and Martha Nye Jackson (wife of Beaux-Arts architect Lewis Stewart). His father was one of the directors of the Pennsylvania Railroad and was president of the United New Jersey Railroad and Canal Company, before it was taken over by the Pennsylvania.

His paternal grandparents were John Peter Jackson and Elizabeth Huntington (née Wolcott) Jackson (a cousin of Roger Wolcott, a Governor of Massachusetts, both grandchildren of Oliver Wolcott, a Governor of Connecticut and a signer of the Declaration of Independence and the Articles of Confederation). His maternal grandparents were Capt. Ezra Nye and Nancy Jane (née Fessenden) Nye of Sandwich, Massachusetts.

Although his father, grandfather, and great-grandfather were all railroad men, Jackson decided early on a naval career. He graduated from the United States Naval Academy in Annapolis, Maryland in 1883. In 1896, Princeton University bestowed on him an honorary M.A. degree.

== Career ==
After his graduation from the Naval Academy, he spent two years with the European Squadron, a part of the United States Navy. Part of the time, he was junior aide to the commander-in-chief of the squadron. Shortly after his marriage in 1886, he was ordered to the join the Pacific Squadron, but due to his new wife's ill health, on June 30, 1886, he resigned his commission as an ensign. Following his service in the Navy, he began studying law before being admitted to the New York bar on February 14, 1889.

=== Diplomatic career ===
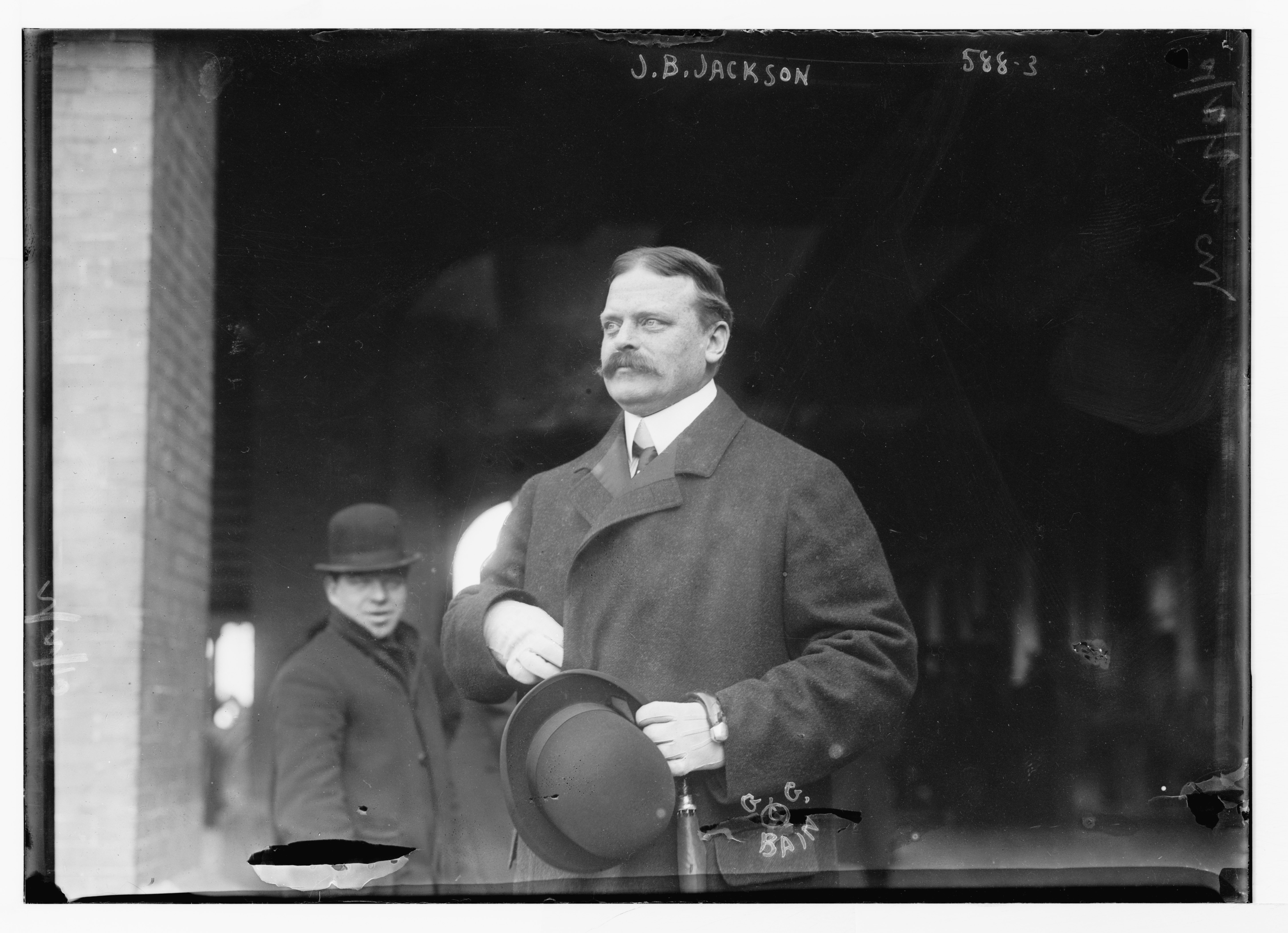
J. B. Jackson

In 1890, Jackson began his long diplomatic career when President Benjamin Harrison appointed him second secretary of the legation in Germany under U.S. Minister William Walter Phelps. Four years later, President Grover Cleveland appointed him secretary of the embassy in Berlin, where he served until 1902, spending twelve years in the country under four different administrations. In 1898, he traveled from Berlin to The Hague to be present at the ceremonies in connection with the accession of Wilhelmina of the Netherlands. In March 1902, Jackson wrote to Secretary of State John Hay regarding Prince Henry of Prussia's successful visit to the U.S., speculating that it will "foster improved relations between the United States and Germany." While secretary of the legation, he frequently served, for a cumulative total of twenty months, as chargé d'affaires ad interim in charge of the embassy. His tenure included the last month of the Spanish–American War, the Hague Convention of 1899 and during the height of the Boxer Rebellion in China.

Following his service in Germany, President Theodore Roosevelt appointed Jackson U.S. Minister to Greece, Romania and Serbia on October 13, 1902, during a recess of the U.S. Senate. He was recommissioned on December 8, 1902, after confirmation. Also on October 13, 1902, he was appointed Minister to Chile, but declined appointment. He presented his credentials in Greece on December 24, 1902, in Romania on April 7, 1903, and in Serbia on May 9, 1904. While a resident of Athens as Minister to Greece, in addition to his responsibilities in Romania and Serbia, he was concurrently appointed as Minister to Bulgaria on June 5, 1903, and Montenegro on March 8, 1905. He presented his credentials in Bulgaria on September 19, 1903, and in Montenegro on October 30, 1905. In September 1904, he represented the United States at the coronation of King Peter I of Serbia.

On July 1, 1907, he was appointed Minister to Persia, presenting his credentials on December 12, 1907, and serving there until he left his post on July 3, 1909. On December 21, 1909, he was appointed Minister to Cuba, presenting his credentials on March 22, 1910, and serving until he presented his recall on October 27, 1911, and returning to the Balkans. On August 12, 1911, shortly before his recall from Havana, he was again appointed Minister to Romania, Serbia and Bulgaria, however this time he was a resident at Bucharest. In February 1912, he was the special representative of the president with rank of ambassador at Sofia for the coming of age of the Crown Prince Boris of Bulgaria. After the Democratic president Woodrow Wilson became president in 1913, Jackson submitted his resignation, as was customary, and it was accepted in August 1913, leaving Bucharest in the end of October 1913. He was succeeded by Charles J. Vopicka.

=== Later career ===
After World War I broke out in 1914, Jackson volunteered his services to the American embassy in Berlin. On January 16, 1915, he was made a special agent of the Department of State to assist James W. Gerard, the American Ambassador, in matters relating to the war. He served on the embassy staff until diplomatic relations were broken off in February 1917, at which point he went to Switzerland. In Zürich in the Spring of 1917, Jackson was playing golf with fellow American diplomat Francis B. Keene when he informed Keene that he and his wife were to move on to Geneva before the arrival of King Constantine. When Keene asked why, he recalled that Jackson said:

"During my time in Athens, when I was Uncle Jack to my niece who was living with us, the whole diplomatic group, including the heir to the throne, Prince Constantine, called me Uncle Jack. Now that we are at war, it would not be just the thing for me to be Uncle Jack to his exiled Majesty. So we are disappearing before he comes."

== Personal life ==
On April 26, 1886, Jackson was married to heiress Florence A. Baird by the Rev. Dr. John S. MacIntosh at the Second Presbyterian Church in Philadelphia. Florence, who lived at 814 N. Broad Street in Francisville, Philadelphia, was a daughter of the late Matthew Baird, the locomotive builder and early partners in the Baldwin Locomotive Works.

He was a member of the New York Bar Association, the Union League Club, the University Club of New York, the Rittenhouse Club in Philadelphia and the Imperial Yacht Club in Kiel, Germany.

After a prolonged illness, Jackson died on December 20, 1920, in Montreux, a Swiss town on the shoreline of Lake Geneva at the foot of the Alps. His brother, the Rev. Frederick W. Jackson, brought his body from Switzerland and he was buried at Laurel Hill Cemetery in Philadelphia. His widow died of uremia, also in Montreux, on November 12, 1936.

Diplomatic posts
| Preceded by Charles Spencer Francis | United States Minister to Greece; 1902–1907 | Succeeded by Richmond Pearson |
| Preceded by Henry L. Wilson | United States Minister to Romania; 1903–1905 | Succeeded by John W. Riddle |
| Preceded by Charles M. Dickinson | United States Minister to Bulgaria; 1903–1907 | Succeeded by Horace G. Knowles |
| Preceded by Charles Spencer Francis | United States Minister to Serbia; 1904–1905 | Succeeded by John W. Riddle |
| Preceded by Richmond Pearson | United States Minister to Persia; 1907–1900 | Succeeded by Charles W. Russell Jr. |
| Preceded by Edwin V. Morgan | United States Minister to Cuba; 1910–1911 | Succeeded by Arthur M. Beaupre |
| Preceded by John R. Carter | United States Minister to Serbia; 1912–1913 | Succeeded by Charles J. Vopicka |
| Preceded by John R. Carter | United States Minister to Bulgaria; 1912–1913 | Succeeded by Charles J. Vopicka |
| Preceded by John R. Carter | United States Minister to Romania; 1911–1913 | Succeeded by Charles J. Vopicka |
