= William Dale Montgomery =

United States diplomat

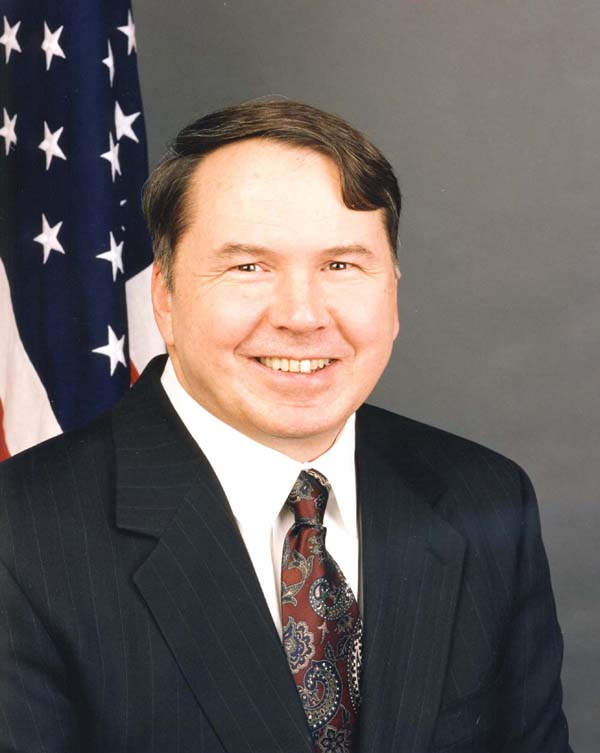
- Official portrait, 2002

United States Ambassador to Serbia and Montenegro
- In office January 4, 2002 – February 24, 2004
- President: George W. Bush
- Preceded by: Richard M. Miles (interim)
- Succeeded by: Michael C. Polt

2nd United States Ambassador to Croatia
- In office January 8, 1998 – September 17, 2000
- President: Bill Clinton
- Preceded by: Peter W. Galbraith
- Succeeded by: Lawrence G. Rossin

United States Ambassador to Bulgaria
- In office October 27, 1993 – January 17, 1996
- President: Bill Clinton
- Preceded by: Hugh Kenneth Hill
- Succeeded by: Avis T. Bohlen

Personal details
- Born: 1945 (age 80–81)

William Dale Montgomery (born 1945) is a retired United States diplomat. He served as the US ambassador in Bulgaria, Croatia and Serbia and Montenegro. After retirement, he continued his activities as a lobbyist for the Serbian government in the 2010s.

== Education and private life ==
Montgomery has a Bachelor's degree in Psychology from Bucknell University and a Master's degree in Business Administration in International Business from George Washington University. While working for the Department of State, he attended the National War College for its one-year program in 1986-87.

William Montgomery is married to Lynn Germain, with whom he has three children. He speaks Bulgarian, Russian, Serbian, and Croatian.

== Career ==
Montgomery served in the U.S. Army from 1967 to 1970, including one year of service in the War in Vietnam. He started his career as a United States Foreign Service Officer in 1974. He was Executive Assistant to Secretary of State Lawrence Eagleburger and then Deputy Secretary of State Clifton Reginald Wharton Jr. He was Deputy Chief of the Mission in Sofia from June 1988 to May 1991.

His other assignments have included Economic-Commercial Officer in the Embassy in Belgrade, Commercial Officer and Political Officer in the Embassy in Moscow, and Deputy Chief of Mission in Dar es Salaam, as well as assignments in Washington, D.C. He served as US Ambassador to Bulgaria from October 1993 to January 1996. In 1996-1997, he served in US State Department Special Advisor for Bosnian Peace Implementation.

Montgomery was selected as Chief of Mission at the US Embassy in Belgrade, Serbia and Montenegro upon the re-establishment of diplomatic relations on 17 November 2000, and was confirmed as the US Ambassador to Serbia and Montenegro on 15 November 2001. He retired in February 2004.

== Activities after retirement ==
Since his retirement, Montgomery has held public views in contrast with the U.S. and European policy towards the Western Balkans.

Writing for the New York Times in 2009, Montgomery called upon the West to stop thinking that it could "establish fully functioning multiethnic societies in Bosnia and Kosovo with no change in borders". The op-ed called for the U.S. to support forceful ethnic separation and redrawing of borders in the Balkans. Critics called Montgomery's op-ed "the Greater Serbian ultranationalist manifesto of our time".

In 2010, while interviewed on Bosnian TV, Montgomery called for the "peaceful dissolution" of Bosnia and Herzegovina - a sentence later widely used by Bosnian Serb leader Milorad Dodik. His statement attracted a rebuke from the U.S. Embassy in Sarajevo.

In 2016, Montgomery published his memoirs book "When the applause dies down - Memories of the last American ambassador to Yugoslavia", in which he contests the consensus among the U.S. foreign policy elites on the need to keep Bosnia and Herzegovina together and to support the independence of Kosovo.

In November 2024, on Serbian TV, Montgomery claimed that Serbia had "done everything right regarding Srebrenica", and that "the EU had treated Serbia very poorly" during accession negotiations.

In late December 2024, while guest on Serbian TV, Montgomery criticized the adoption of the United Nations General Assembly Resolution 78/282 and minimised the Srebrenica genocide, claiming that “genocide” is a “stretched qualification”, using instead the terminology of “terrible crime” as in the Serbian narrative on the July 1995 massacre. In the same interview, Montgomery claimed that the Dayton Peace Accords should have established three entities instead of two - a long-term goal of Bosnian Croat nationalist parties. He claimed that "the documents relating to Kosovo and Dayton reflect our [U.S.] insistence on multicultural societies, but they do not emphasize the ethnic issue, and here the ethnic issue is very important".

== Awards ==
At the end of his tour as Deputy Chief of Mission, the Bulgarian government awarded him the Order Of The Madara Horseman, First Class. At the end of his tour as Ambassador to Bulgaria, Montgomery was awarded the Order of the Stara Planina, First Class, by the Government of Bulgaria.

He has one Distinguished Honor Award, two individual and two group Superior Honor Awards, and one Meritorious Honor Award from the US Department of State. He is also a recipient of an ABA-CEELI award for his efforts to promote the rule of law in Central and Eastern Europe.

His army decorations include the Bronze Star, Army Commendation Medal with "V" (for valor), Combat Infantryman Badge, Parachute Badge, and Vietnam Service Medal.

== Sources ==
- Trifkovic, Srdja (12 February 2004). "U.S. AMBASSADOR IN SERBIA DEPARTS UNDER THE CLOUD".
- Office of the Historian: William Dale Montgomery

Diplomatic posts
Preceded by Hugh Kenneth Hill	United States Ambassador to Bulgaria; 1993–1996	Succeeded by Avis T. Bohlen
Preceded by Peter W. Galbraith	United States Ambassador to Croatia; 1998–2001	Succeeded by Lawrence G. Rossin
Preceded by Richard Miles (Interim)	United States Ambassador to Serbia and Montenegro; 2002–2004	Succeeded by Michael C. Polt
