= Frederic Jesup Stimson =

American diplomat (1855–1943)

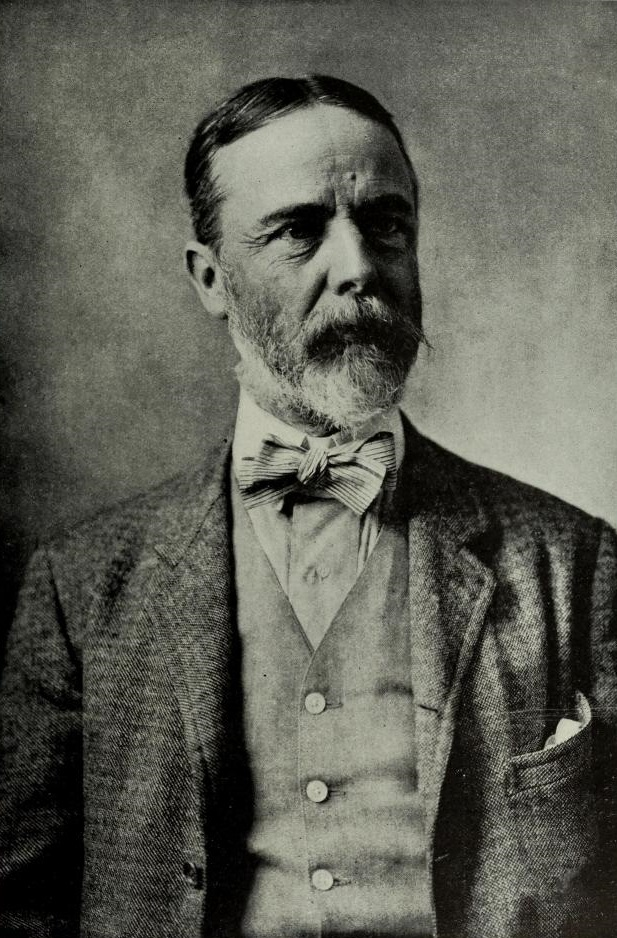

21st United States Ambassador to Argentina
- In office January 8, 1915 – April 21, 1921
- President: Woodrow Wilson
- Preceded by: John W. Garrett
- Succeeded by: John W. Riddle

Personal details
- Born: July 20, 1855 Dedham, Massachusetts
- Died: November 19, 1943 (aged 88) Dedham, Massachusetts
- Resting place: Old Village Cemetery
- Party: Democratic
- Spouses: Elizabeth Bradlee Abbot (m. 1881; died 1896) Mabel Ashhurst (m. 1902)
- Children: Mildred Stimson; Margaret "Lorna" Stimson
- Education: Harvard University (A.B., LL.B., LL.D.)
- Profession: Writer, lawyer, diplomat
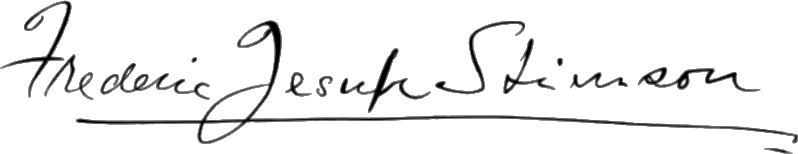
- Signature

Frederic Jesup Stimson (July 20, 1855 – November 19, 1943) was an American writer and lawyer, who served as the United States Ambassador to Argentina from 1915 to 1921.

== Career ==
Stimson was a Harvard Law graduate and writer of several influential books on law, and also a novelist specializing in historical romances, sometimes writing under the pen name "J.S. of Dale".

Stimson served as the United States Ambassador to Argentina from 1915 to 1921. He was the first U.S. envoy to Argentina to hold the title "Ambassador", the previous envoys having held the title "Envoy Extraordinary and Minister Plenipotentiary".

== Personal life ==
Stimson was born in Dedham, Massachusetts on July 20, 1855. (Note: His record at the Old Village Cemetery lists his place of birth as Philadelphia.) He later purchased the home built by Fisher Ames. He named the home "Three Rivers and, during the Great Depression, held a fundraiser there for the milk fund of the Dedham Social Service Board." At the event there was a reenactment of the original settlers paddling up the Charles River in birch bark canoes and, when they disembarked, they were greeted by the indigenous inhabitants.

Stimson had two wives: Elizabeth Bradlee Abbot and Mabel Ashhurst. He married Abbot in 1881, and had two children with her: Mildred Stimson (April 23, 1883 – December 17, 1966) and Margaret "Lorna" Stimson (January 3, 1889 – July 12, 1956). Following Abbot's death in 1896, Stimson married Ashhurst in 1902.

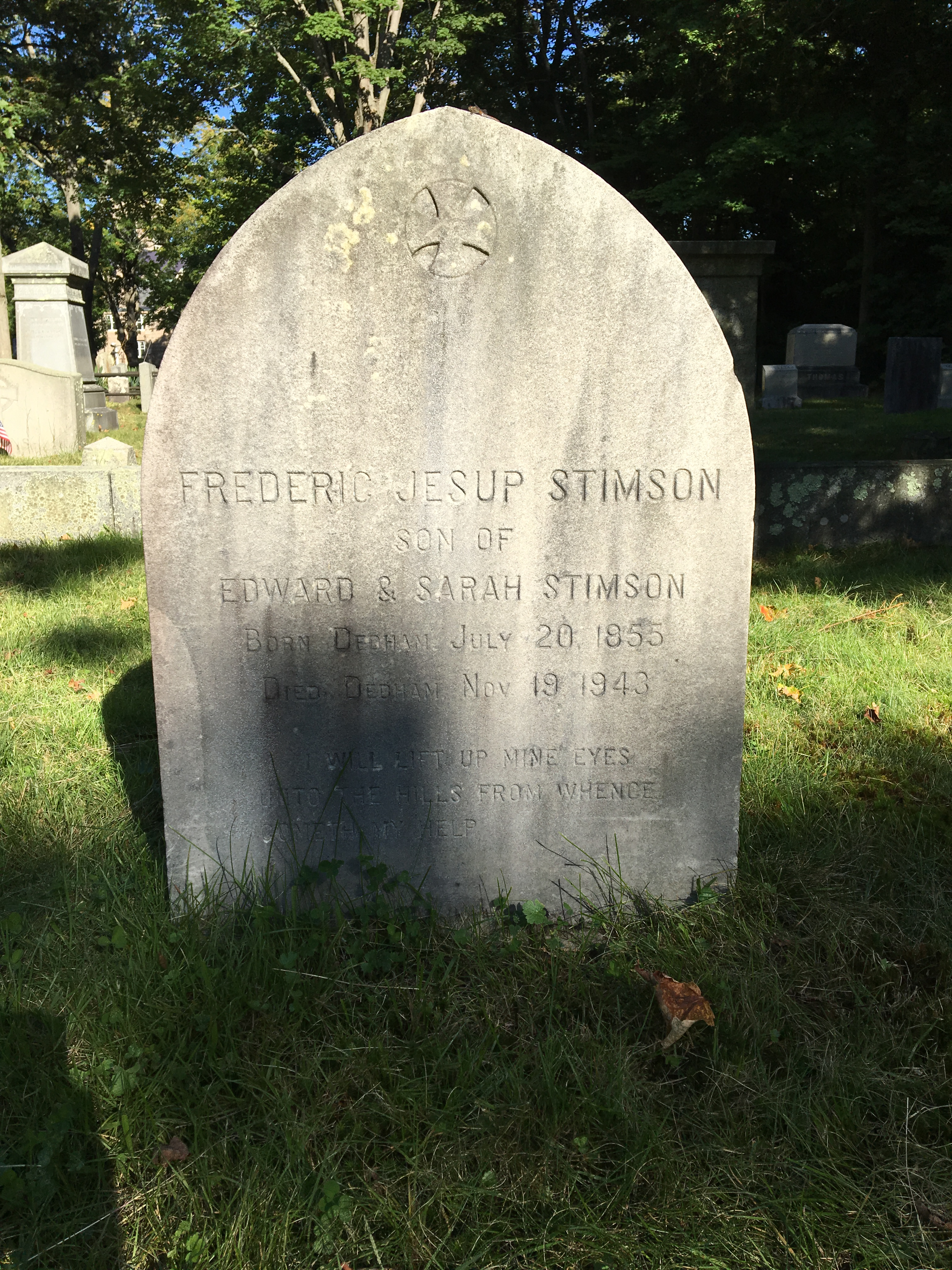
Frederic Jesup Stimson's grave in the Old Village Cemetery

He died at his home in Dedham on November 19, 1943. He is buried in lot EI3 at the Old Village Cemetery.
