= Hugh Kenneth Hill =

Former Ambassador of the United States to Bulgaria

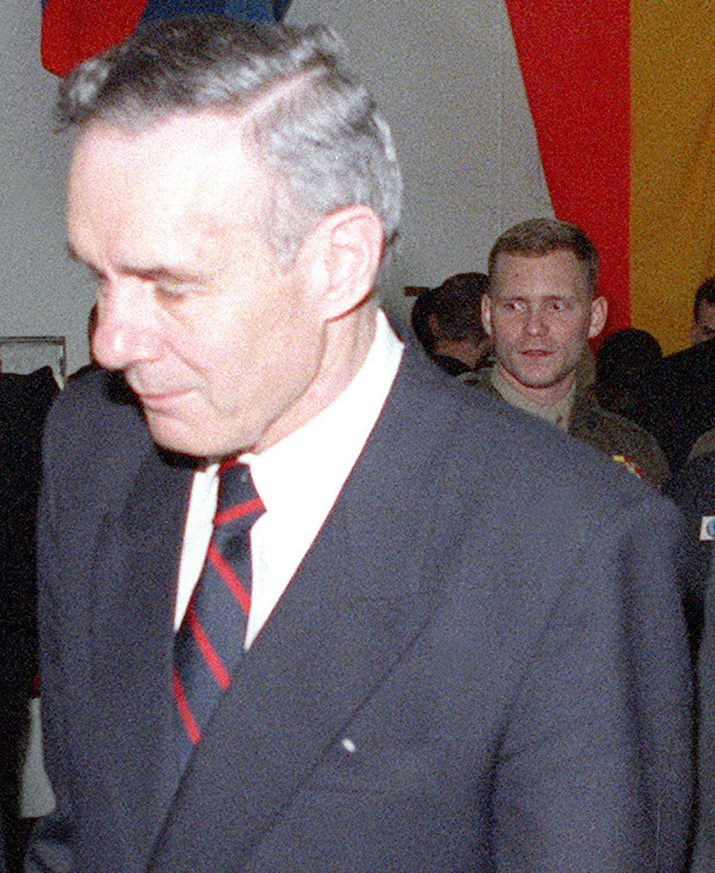
- Hill in 1992

United States Ambassador to Bulgaria
- In office 1990–1993
- President: George H. W. Bush
- Preceded by: Sol Polansky
- Succeeded by: William Dale Montgomery

Personal details
- Born: June 14, 1937 (age 89) Cushing, Texas, U.S.

Hugh Kenneth Hill (born June 14, 1937) is a former Ambassador of the United States to Bulgaria from 1990 until 1993 and a former Chargé d'affaires in Zambia.

Hill graduated from the University of California (B.A., 1959; M.A., 1964).

== See also ==
- List of ambassadors of the United States to Bulgaria
