= Charles M. Dickinson =

American lawyer, editor, and diplomat

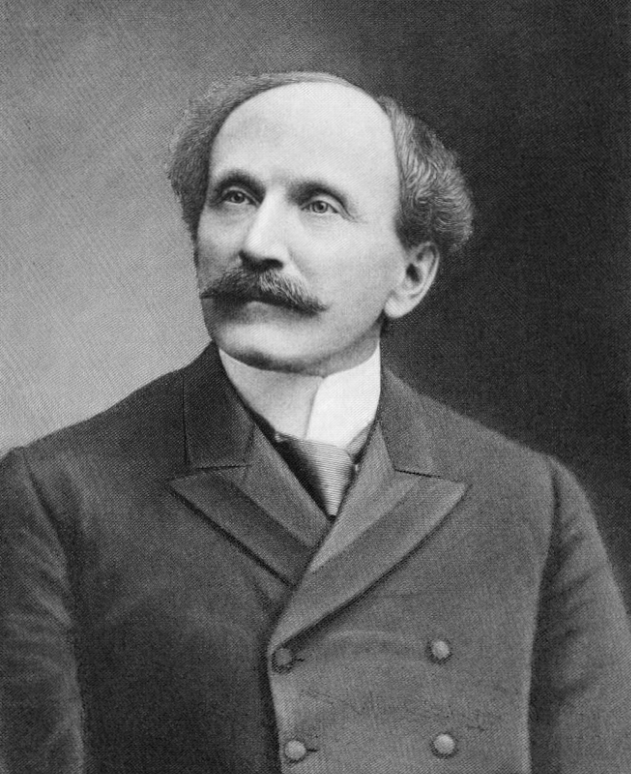
- Portrait of Dickinson in a 1911 publication
- Born: Charles Monroe Dickinson; November 15, 1842; Lowville, New York, U.S.
- Died: July 3, 1924 (aged 81); Binghamton, New York, U.S.
- Resting place: Spring Forest Cemetery; Binghamton, New York, U.S.
- Occupations: Lawyer; newspaper editor; diplomat
- Spouse(s): Bessie Virginia Hotchkiss (m. 1867; died 1908) Alice Bond Minard (m. 1910)
- Children: 3

Charles Monroe Dickinson (November 15, 1842 – July 3, 1924) was an American lawyer, newspaper editor, and diplomat from New York.

== Life ==
Dickinson was born on November 15, 1842, in Lowville, New York. His parents were Richard Dickinson, a miller and farmer, and Bessie Rea. He attended Fairfield Seminary and Lowville Academy.

After graduating, Dickinson taught school for about two years. During that time, he wrote The Children, which Hezekiah Butterworth called the second most popular American poem and Rossiter Johnson ranked as one of the world's most famous poems. Dickinson received letters from all over the world about the poem to his dying day, 53 years after he first wrote it. It was widely believed that the poem wasn't written by Dickinson, but by Charles Dickens, with the poem found in the late author's desk. When Dickinson published The Children and Other Verses in 1889, it included a letter from Dickens' son Charles Dickens, Jr. where he insisted the poem was written by Dickinson and not his father.

In 1864, he moved to Binghamton and began to study law under Daniel S. Dickinson. Before he was admitted to the bar, he would be sent out to try cases before justices of the peace in neighboring towns. He was admitted to the bar in 1865 and initially practiced law in Cameron County, Pennsylvania. In 1867, he returned to Binghamton and practiced law in association with his father-in-law Giles W. Hotchkiss. This practice brought him in contact with leading New York merchants. As his practice grew, he established an office and home in New York City, where he was given the law business of Louis F. Payn, the United States Marshal for the Southern District of New York. He continued to practice in Binghamton and New York City until 1878.

His law practice became so large, Dickinson was forced to leave his law practice for poor health. He returned to Binghamton, bought most of the land in South Mountain, and for two years superintended the clearing of the forest which covered the hill. He then bought the controlling interest of the failing newspaper The Binghamton Republican. Within two months, the newspaper stopped losing money and began to turn a profit. Under him, it was also one of the first newspapers in the state to install the linotype machine. He later became the sole owner of the paper. In 1892, while serving as a member of the New York State Associated Press, he was critically involved in the reorganizing of the Associated Press. He then began a 13-month tour abroad, studying and becoming critical of America's foreign service.

In the 1896 presidential election, Dickinson was a presidential elector for William McKinley and Garret Hobart. In 1897, McKinley appointed him consul-general of Istanbul, in the Ottoman Empire. During his time as consul-general, he helped grow trade between the United States and the Ottoman Empire and helped establish a direct steamship line between the two countries. In 1901, he was also appointed diplomatic agent to Bulgaria. However, Ferdinand I of Bulgaria refused to receive him, as he and his ministers were troubled by how he remained consul to Constantinople, their old enemy.

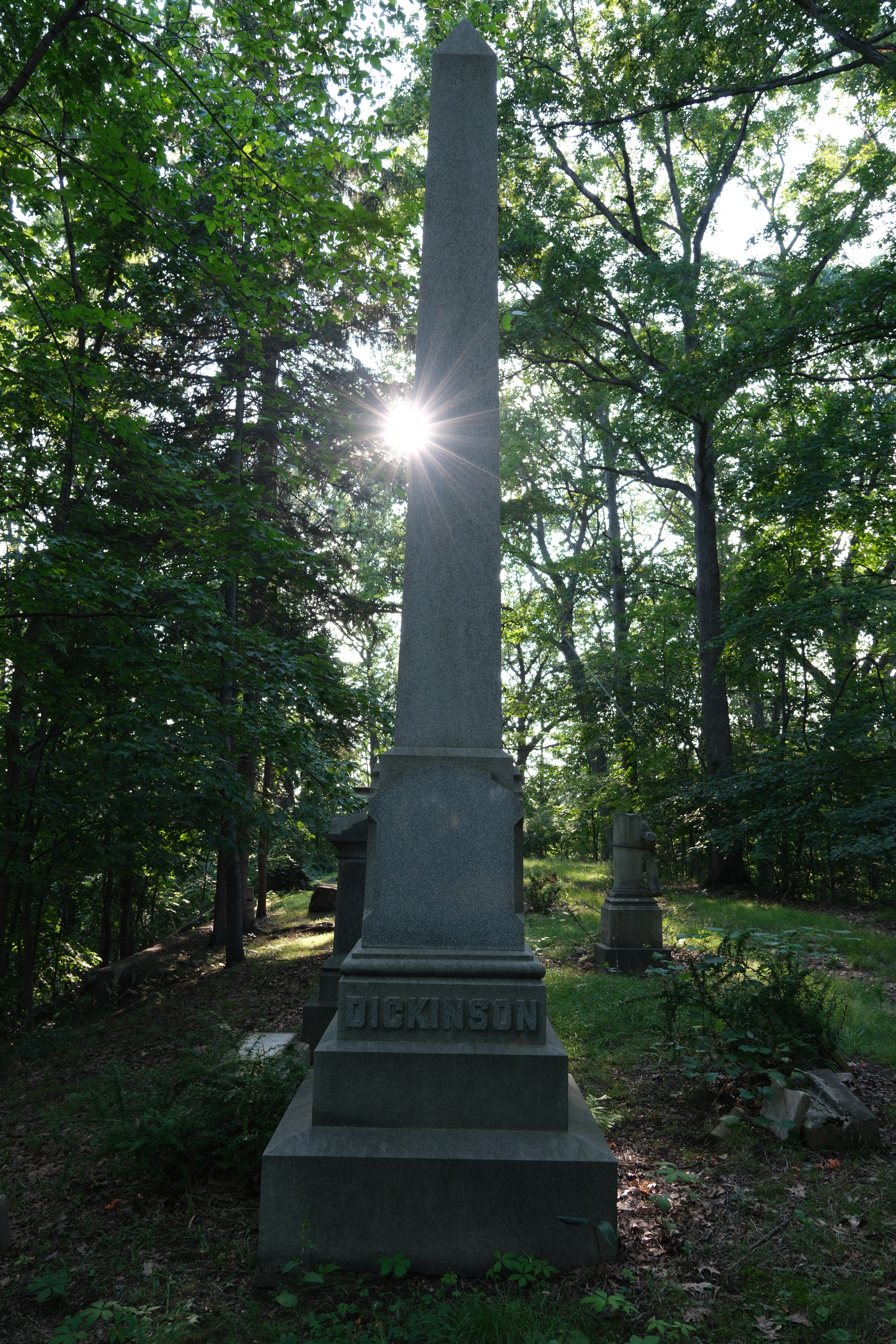
Grave of Dickinson in Spring Forest Cemetery

As diplomatic agent, Dickinson was quickly put to work in freeing American missionary Ellen Maria Stone and Bulgarian missionary Katerina Cilka, who were both kidnapped by the Internal Macedonian Revolutionary Organization. As he uncovered more facts about the kidnapping, his enemies began a campaign against him, his life was threatened, and guards were placed around his home. Over the course of several months, he negotiated with the kidnappers and, after paying 14,500 Ottoman lira raised by American Sunday schools, was able to get Stone and Cilka released.

In 1906, Dickinson was appointed one of the first Consul General at Large, assigned to visit and supervise consulates in various countries. He resigned in 1907 due to his wife's poor health and returned to Binghamton.

Dickinson was a member of the Authors Club of New York and the Poetry Society of America, and served as trustee of the Barlow Industrial School. In 1867, he married Bessie Virginia Hotchkiss, daughter of congressman Giles W. Hotchkiss. She died in 1908. Dickinson then married Alice Bond Minard of Poughkeepsie in 1910. He had two sons, Giles Hotchkiss Dickinson and Charles Hotchkiss Dickinson, and an adopted daughter, Lady Poynter.

Dickinson died on July 3, 1924, at his home in South Mountain Park in Binghamton. He was buried in Spring Forest Cemetery.

Diplomatic posts
Preceded by New Title	United States Minister to Bulgaria; 1901–1903	Succeeded by John Brinkerhoff Jackson
