= John M. McSweeney =

American diplomat

John Morgan McSweeney was the first American ambassador to Bulgaria (1967–1969). At first, he was envoy extraordinary and minister plenipotentiary until being promoted to ambassador in 1967.

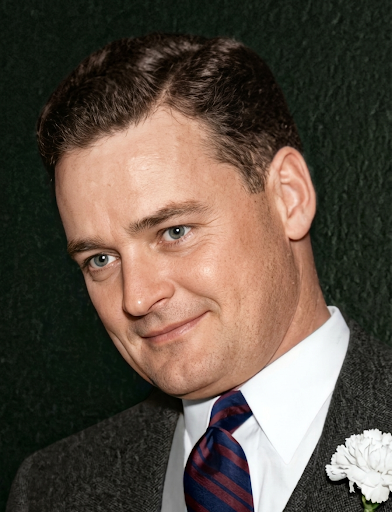
John M. McSweeney on Wedding Day

From 1959 until 1962, McSweeney was the director of the Office of Soviet Union Affairs at the State Department and also served as political advisor to the Allied Forces for Southern Europe in Naples, Italy, and to the Strategic Air Command in Omaha, Nebraska.

Born in Boston in 1916, McSweeney graduated from Brown University. He died of cancer at his home in Sarasota, Florida on December 12, 1979.

Diplomatic posts
Preceded by Nathaniel Davis	United States Ambassador to Bulgaria; September 16, 1966 – May 29, 1970	Succeeded by Horace G. Torbert, Jr.
