= Matthew Baird =

Irish executive (1817–1877)

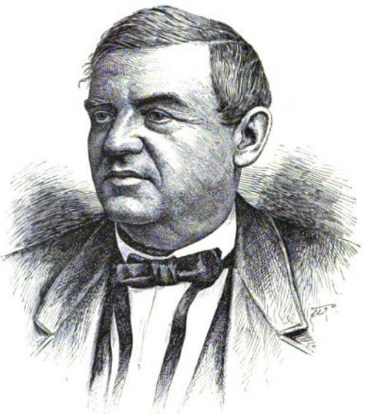
- Born: October 8, 1817; Derry, Ireland
- Died: May 19, 1877 (aged 59); Philadelphia, Pennsylvania, U.S.
- Employer: Baldwin Locomotive Works
- Spouses: Ann Eliza Monroe (died 1863) Anna Wright (m. 1871)

Matthew Baird (October 8, 1817 – May 19, 1877) was one of the early partners in the Baldwin Locomotive Works.

== Early life ==
Baird was born in Derry, Ireland, in 1817. In 1821, at the age of four, his parents brought him to Philadelphia, Pennsylvania.

Baird was educated in the public schools of Philadelphia and, at an early age, secured a position as assistant to one of the professors of chemistry at the University of Pennsylvania. During that position, he acquired "valuable training and technical knowledge that was of the utmost use to him in his future business career."

== Career ==
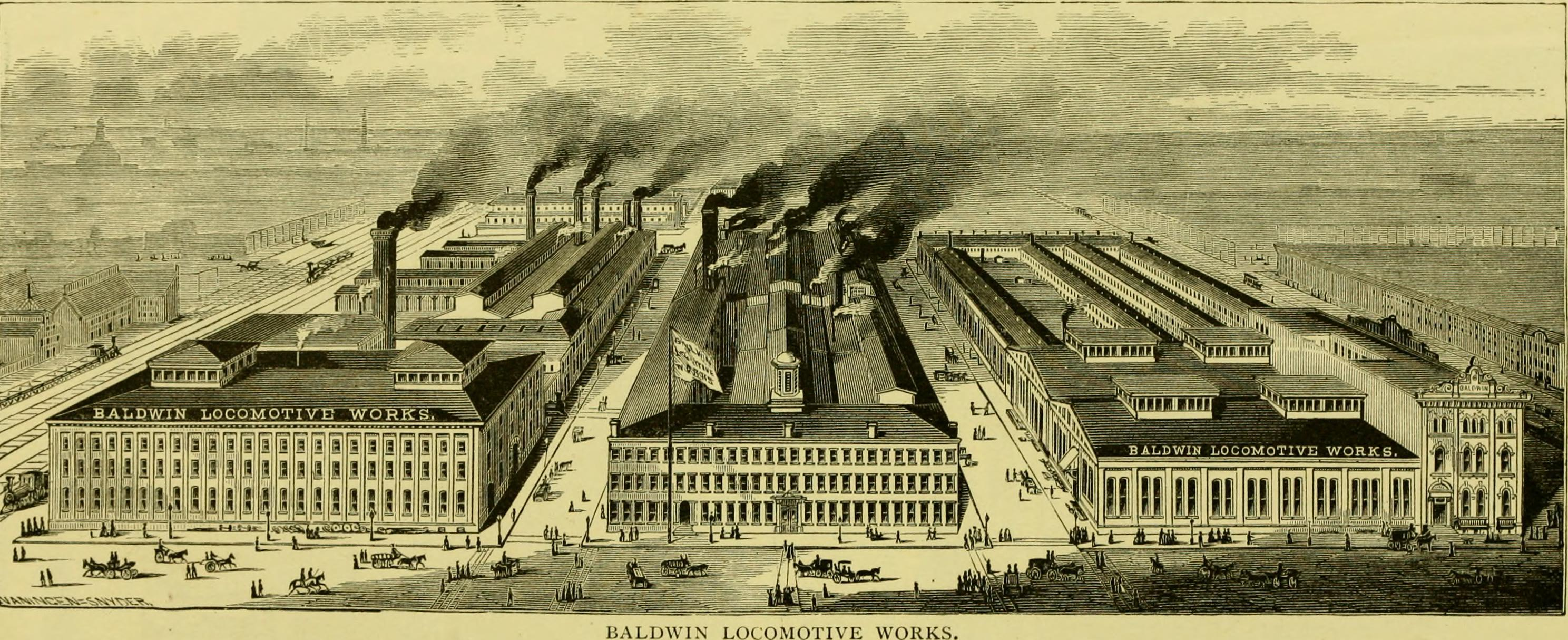
Baldwin Locomotive Works, c. 1875

Baird went to work for the nascent railroad industry in the 1830s. He started with an apprenticeship at the New Castle Manufacturing Company in Delaware between 1834 and 1836. He then went on to become the superintendent of the Newcastle and Frenchtown Railway (N&F) shops. He left the N&F to become foreman of the Baldwin Locomotive Works in 1838. In this position, he was co-author on a patent for a spark arrestor in 1842 that has since become known as the "French and Baird stack".

In 1854, Baird invested in a share of the Baldwin Locomotive Works, becoming a partner. At this time, he developed (but did not patent) a new fire arch to improve steam locomotive combustion. The improved fire arch was subsequently patented by George S. Griggs on December 15, 1857 (U.S. patent 18,883).

Upon Baldwin's death in 1866, Baird became the sole proprietor of the company. In 1867, he formed a partnership with George Burnham and Charles T. Parry under the firm name of The Baldwin Locomotive Works, M. Baird & Co., Proprietors, which continued until his retirement in 1873.

Baird served as a director of the Central National Bank, the Texas Pacific Railroad Company, Pennsylvania Steel Company, Andover Iron Company, West Chester and Philadelphia Railroad Company. He was also one of the incorporators and a director of the American Steamship Company and was a large stockholder of the Pennsylvania Railroad.

== Personal life ==
1860 census lived in Darby PA; page #44 Darby Borough, US Census

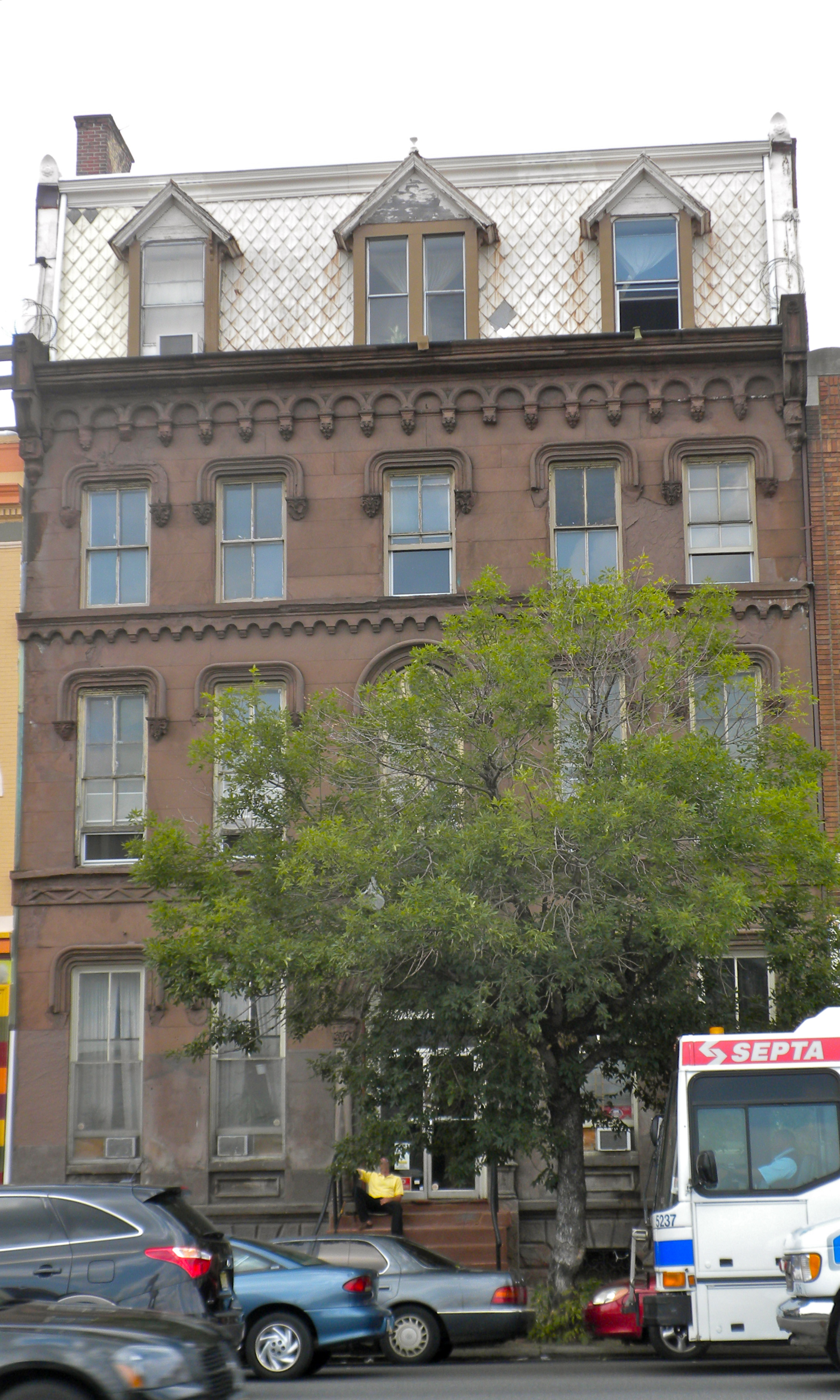
The Baird Mansion at 814 N. Broad Street, Francisville, built in 1863–1864

Baird was twice married. His first wife of Ann Eliza Monroe (1827–1863), a daughter of John Monroe and Mary Ann Monroe. Together, they were the parents of:

- William H. Baird (1847–1871)
- Walter Thomas Baird (1851–1881), who married Esther Evans Peterson in 1876.
- Mary Louise Baird (1859–1946), who married Dr. Edward Oram Shakespeare, a prominent ophthalmic surgeon, in 1889.
- Florence A. Baird (d. 1936), who married diplomat John Brinckerhoff Jackson in 1886.

After the death of his first wife in 1863, he remarried to Anna Wright (1840–1919) on June 1, 1871. Anna was a daughter of politician and landowner Benjamin Franklin Wright and Margaretta Miller (née McLean) Wright. Together, they were the parents of:

- Edgar Wright Baird (1872–1934), who married Mabel Rogers, a granddaughter of William Barton Rogers, founder of MIT.
- William James Baird (1873–1924), who married Maria Uytendale Hendrickson, a daughter of Judge Charles Hendrickson of New Jersey.
- Marian Baird (1875–1966), who married Reed Augustus Morgan and moved to France.
- Cora Baird (1876–1965), who married Henry Sulger Jeanes.
- Matthew Baird Jr. (1877–1955), who married Mary Louise Register, a daughter of I. Layton Register.

Baird died in Philadelphia on May 19, 1877.

=== Honors and legacy ===
The town of Baird, Texas, is named after Matthew Baird. The Matthew Baird Mansion was added to the National Register of Historic Places in 1983.
