= Avis T. Bohlen =

American diplomat (born 1940)

Avis Bohlen

32nd United States Ambassador to Bulgaria
- In office September 5, 1996 – August 13, 1999
- President: Bill Clinton
- Preceded by: William Dale Montgomery
- Succeeded by: Richard Miles

Personal details
- Born: April 20, 1940 (age 86) Bryn Mawr, Pennsylvania
- Spouse: David Calleo
- Education: Radcliffe College (B.A., 1961); Columbia University (M.A., 1965)
- Profession: Diplomat

Avis Thayer Bohlen (born April 20, 1940) is a diplomat and former Assistant Secretary for Arms Control (1999–2002) and United States Ambassador to Bulgaria (1996–1999).

== Life ==
Bohlen's parents were Charles E. Bohlen, former Ambassador to the Soviet Union (1953–1957), and Avis Howard Thayer. She is a member of the American Academy of Diplomacy and Council on Foreign Relations.

Diplomatic posts
Preceded by William Dale Montgomery	United States Ambassador to Bulgaria; 1996–1999	Succeeded by Richard Monroe Miles
