= Charles J. Vopicka =

American diplomat

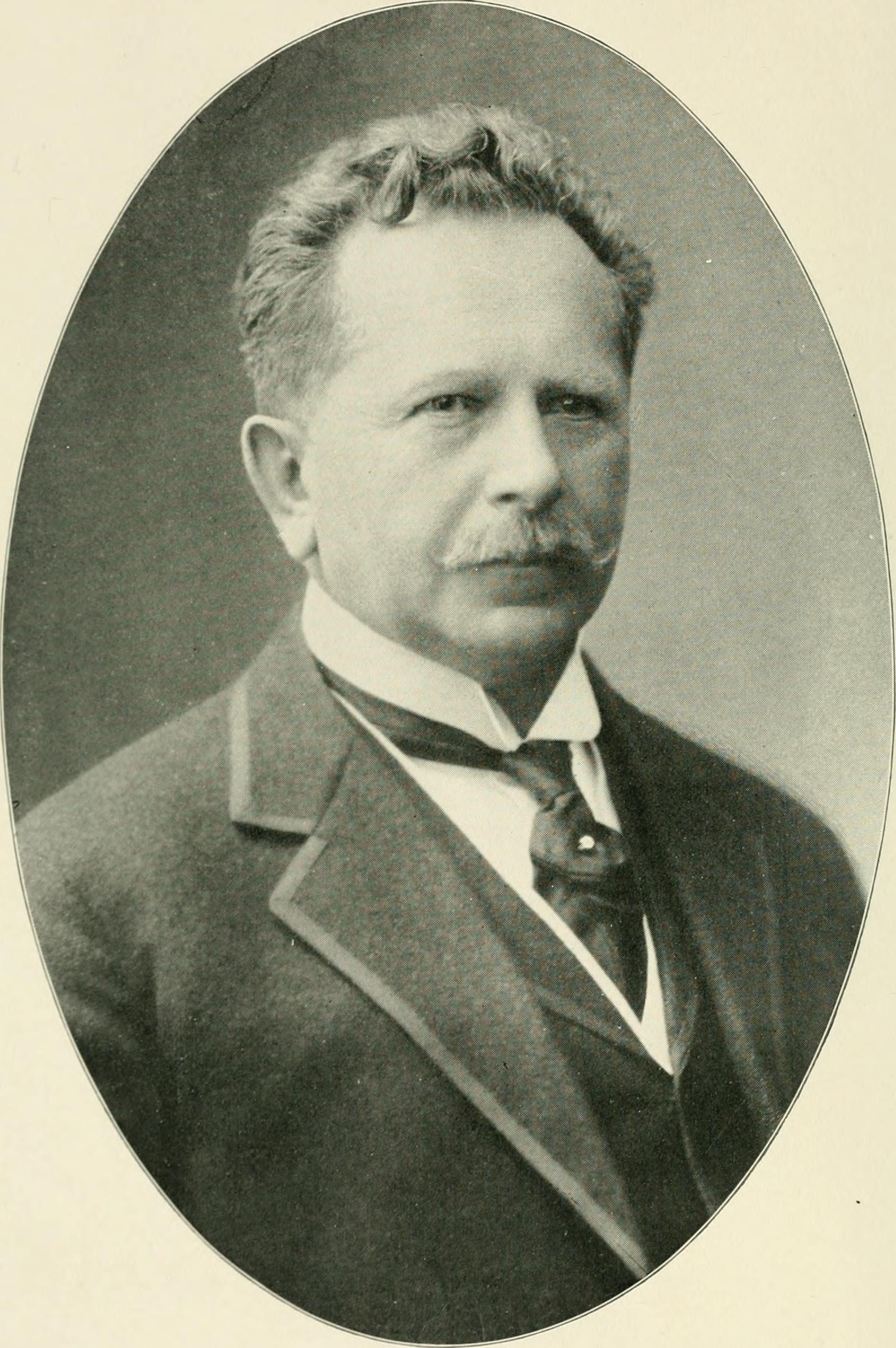
- Photograph of Vopicka from Secrets of the Balkans (1921).

United States Minister to Romania
- In office November 27, 1913 – July 10, 1920
- President: Woodrow Wilson
- Preceded by: John Brinkerhoff Jackson
- Succeeded by: Peter Augustus Jay

United States Minister to Bulgaria
- In office December 26, 1913 – December 17, 1918
- President: Woodrow Wilson
- Preceded by: John Brinkerhoff Jackson
- Succeeded by: Charles Stetson Wilson

United States Minister to Serbia
- In office December 15, 1913 – December 17, 1918
- President: Woodrow Wilson
- Preceded by: John Brinkerhoff Jackson
- Succeeded by: Henry Percival Dodge (as U.S. Minister to Serbs, Croats and Slovenes)

Personal details
- Born: Karel Boromejský Josef Vopička; November 3, 1857 Dolní Hbity, Bohemia, Austrian Empire
- Died: September 4, 1935 (aged 77) Chicago, Illinois, U.S.
- Party: Democratic
- Spouse: Victoria K. Kubin (m. 1883)
- Children: 6

Charles Joseph Vopicka (born Karel Boromejský Josef Vopička; November 3, 1857 – September 4, 1935) was an American diplomat of Czech origin who served as United States Minister to Bulgaria, Romania, and Serbia.

== Early life ==
He was born as Karel Boromejský Josef Vopička on 3 November 1857 at Dolní Hbity house 2, Příbram, Bohemia, Austrian Empire and baptized Catholic the next day. He was one of fourteen children. His father was a farmer and the mayor of their community.

By 1880, he had emigrated to live in Racine and Milwaukee, Wisconsin, before moving to Chicago in 1881.

== Career ==
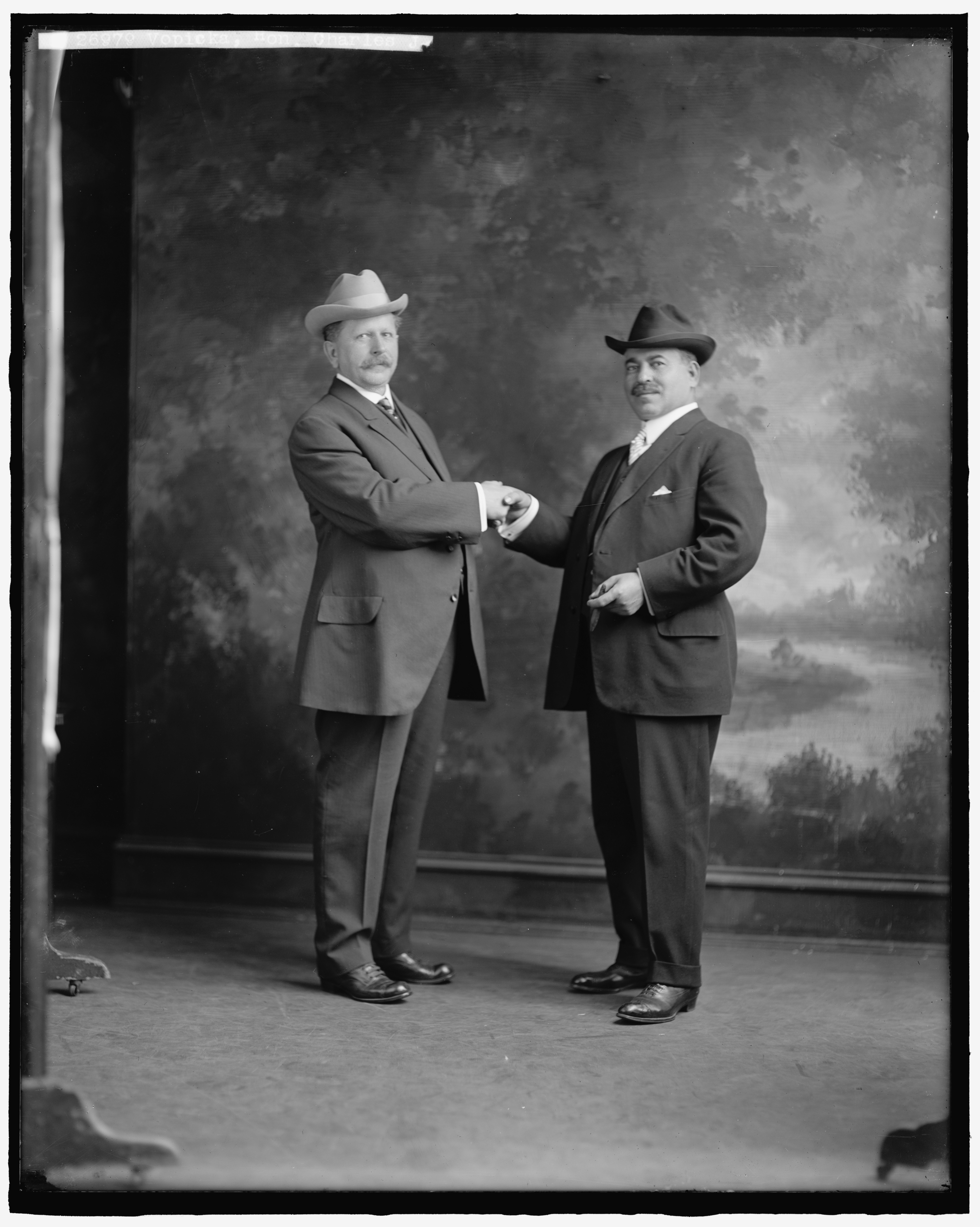
Photograph of The Hon. Charles J. Vopicka from the Library of Congress

He worked with his wife's brother Otto Kubin in the real estate and banking business until 1888. In the early 1900s, he became the President and Manager of Atlas Brewing Company of Chicago. He ran for Congress on the Democratic ticket in 1904 for the fifth district of Illinois but did not win.

On September 11, 1913, President Woodrow Wilson appointed Vopicka as United States Envoy Extraordinary and Minister Plenipotentiary to Romania, Serbia and Bulgaria. The outbreak of the Great War made his job all the more difficult.

Added to the delicate situation which was created by the daily snapping of diplomatic threads, there was imposed upon him the extra hazardous task of acting as Chairman of the International Commission in Serbia, where he was also representing the German and Austro-Hungarian interests. He was representing British interests in Bulgaria and German and Turkish interests in Romania. Representing nine nations in Bucharest, during the German occupation of that city, his life for four years was one of extraordinary activity and private and public strain. Acting for Germany and Turkey he handed their ultimatum to Romania. Likewise, to him, the task of persuading several hundred thousand Russians to remain in the trenches to fight the Central Powers fell to a bitter end. After the termination of hostilities and the consequent resumption of international amenities, Minister Vopicka conducted parleys for the various powers and has notably assisted in the task of building order out of chaos and destruction. In the spring of 1920, he resigned.

In 1917, Vopicka traveled to Berlin, after remaining in Bucharest after the removal of the Romanian Government to Jassy (whose withdrawal was requested by the German Government). Germany later withdrew the charges and Vopicka returned to Bucharest.

=== Later career ===
After his diplomatic career ended in 1920, he returned to Chicago where he was a member of the Board of Education from 1927 to 1930. A friend of Queen Marie of Romania, he was instrumental in bringing the Queen to Chicago when she visited the United States in 1926. He also served as chairman of the board of the Atlas Brewing Company until he died in 1935.

== Personal life ==
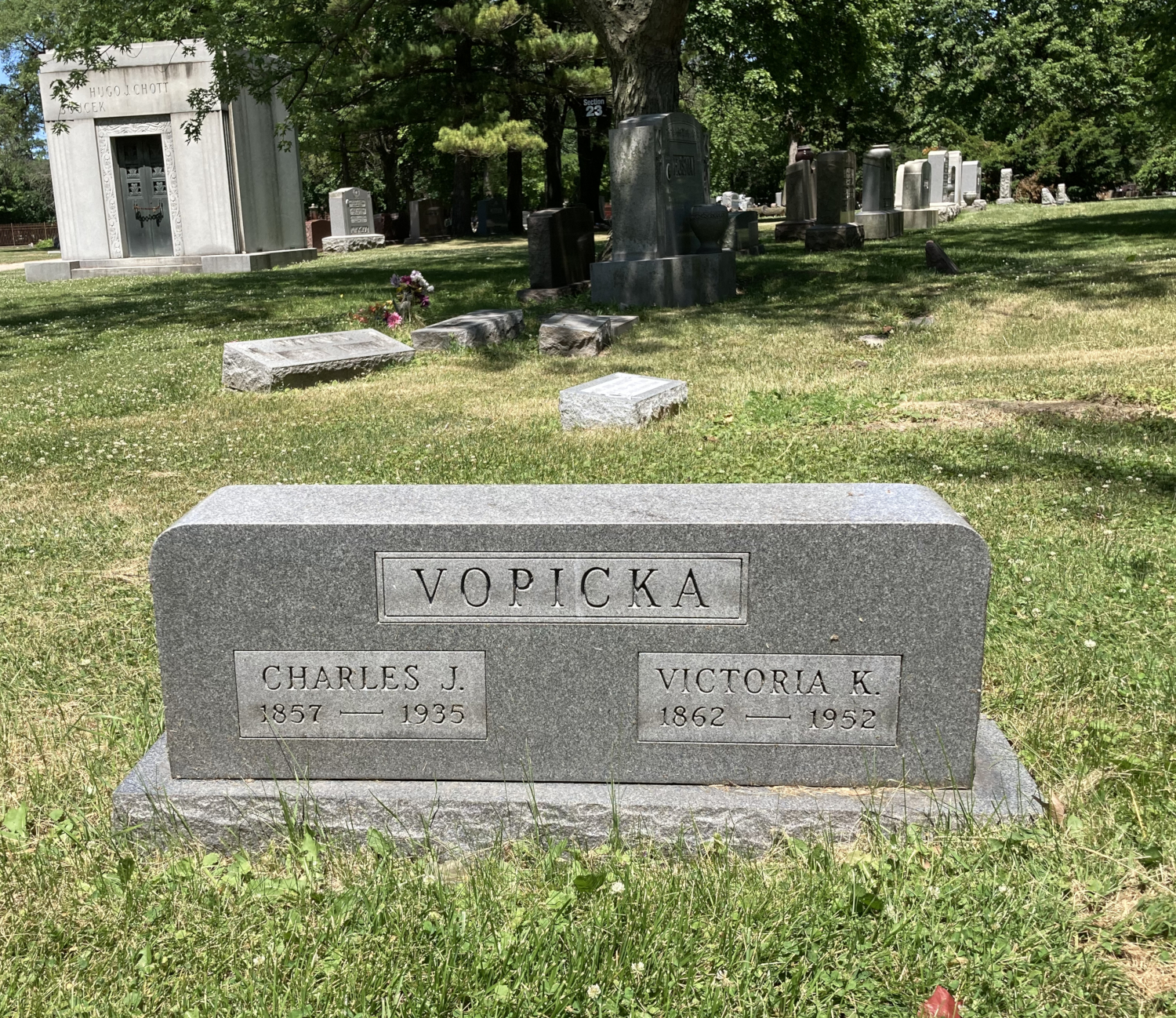
Vopicka's grave at Bohemian National Cemetery

On February 3, 1883, Vopicka was married to Victoria K. Kubin (1862–1952) from Mníšek, a daughter of organist Martin Kubín and Antonie (née Rudisher) Kubin. Together, they were the parents of six daughters, including:

- Victoria Vopicka, who married U.S. Representative William H. Stevenson.
- Elsie Vopicka, who married Edward Kralovec.
- Clara Vopicka, who married Jerome Schelsinger.
- Mildred Vopicka, who married Thomas J. Doyle.
- Helen Vopicka, who married Gordon William Dougherty.
- Harriet Vopicka, who married Raymond Hockmuth.

Vopicka died in Chicago on September 4, 1935, after attending the funeral of Anna Wilmarth Ickes, wife of Franklin D. Roosevelt's Cabinet member Harold L. Ickes. After a funeral held at Pilsen Hall in Chicago, Vopicka was buried in the Bohemian National Cemetery.

=== Honors and legacy ===
In 1918, he was awarded the Grand Cross of the Star of Romania "as a recognition of his devotion to the allied cause and especially to Rumania during these trying times." He also received the Grand Cordon of the White Eagle, First Class, from the Prince Regent of Serbia.

Diplomatic posts
Preceded by John B. Jackson	United States Minister to Serbia; 1913-1918	Succeeded by Henry Percival Dodge as Minister to Yugoslavia
Preceded by John B. Jackson	United States Minister to Bulgaria; 1913-1918	Succeeded by Charles Stetson Wilson
Preceded by John B. Jackson	United States Minister to Romania; 1913-1920	Succeeded by Peter Augustus Jay
