= John W. Riddle =

American diplomat (1864-1941)

John Wallace Riddle Jr.
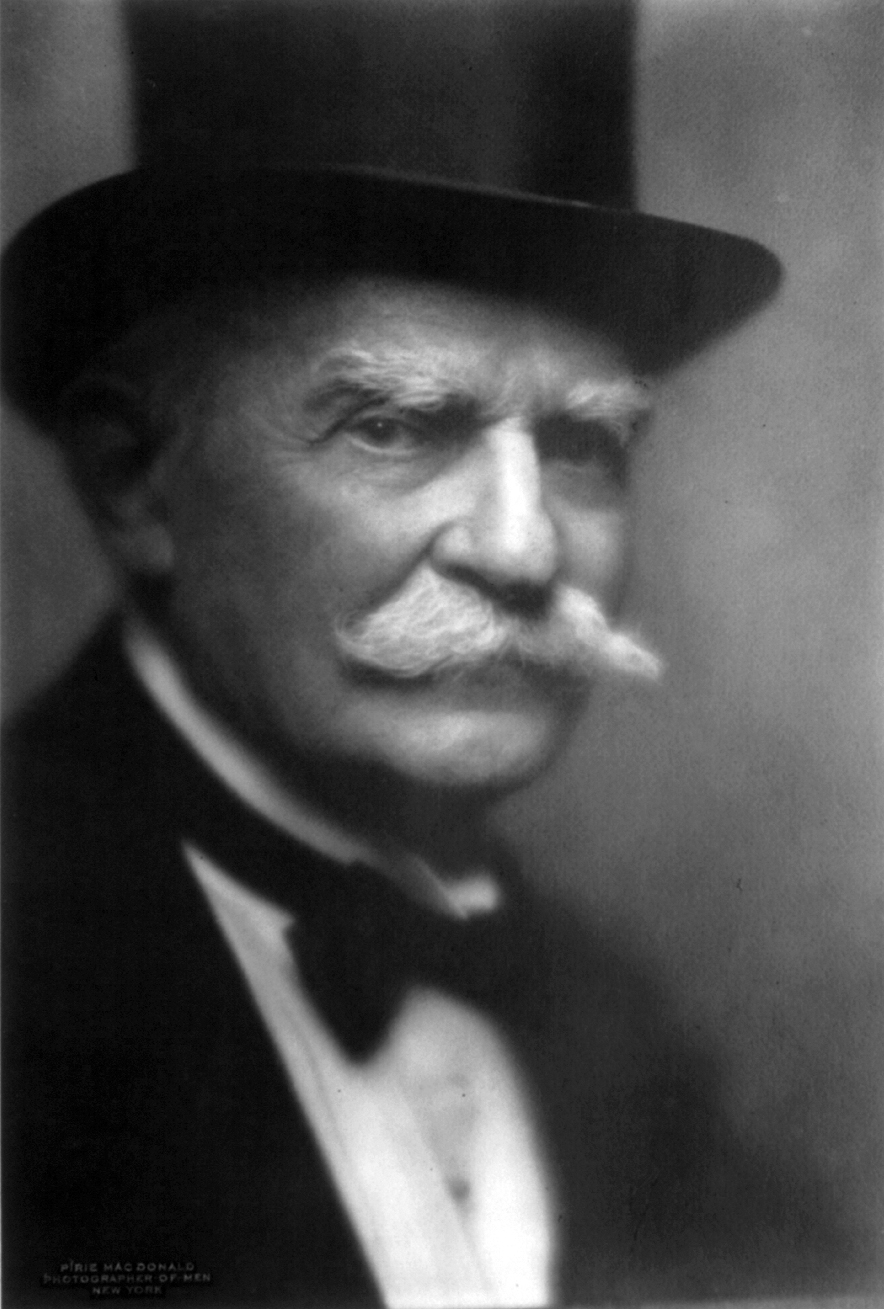
- John W. Riddle, photo by Pirie MacDonald

22nd United States Ambassador to Argentina
- In office March 8, 1922 – May 28, 1925
- President: Warren G. Harding; Calvin Coolidge
- Preceded by: Frederic Jesup Stimson
- Succeeded by: Peter Augustus Jay

United States Ambassador to Russia
- In office February 8, 1907 – September 8, 1909
- President: Theodore Roosevelt; William Howard Taft
- Preceded by: George von Lengerke Meyer
- Succeeded by: William Woodville Rockhill

United States Minister to Serbia
- In office May 7, 1906 – January 23, 1907
- President: Theodore Roosevelt
- Preceded by: John Brinkerhoff Jackson
- Succeeded by: Horace G. Knowles

United States Minister to Romania
- In office October 3, 1905 – January 23, 1907
- President: Theodore Roosevelt
- Preceded by: John Brinkerhoff Jackson
- Succeeded by: Horace G. Knowles

Personal details
- Born: July 12, 1864 Philadelphia, Pennsylvania
- Died: December 8, 1941 (aged 77) Farmington, Connecticut
- Spouse: Theodate Pope Riddle (m. 1916)
- Parent(s): John Wallace Riddle Sr. Rebecca Blair McClure
- Education: Harvard University (BA); Columbia Law School; Sciences Po; Collège de France
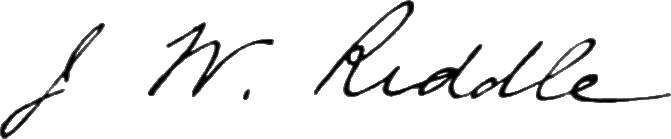
- Signature

John Wallace Riddle Jr. (July 12, 1864 – December 8, 1941) was an American diplomat. His first diplomatic assignment was as agent/consul general in Egypt (1904–1905). He was then sent to Romania and Serbia in 1905 to serve as Envoy Extraordinary and Minister Plenipotentiary (residing in Bucharest), followed by postings as U.S. ambassador to Russia (1907–1909) and ambassador to Argentina (1922–1925).

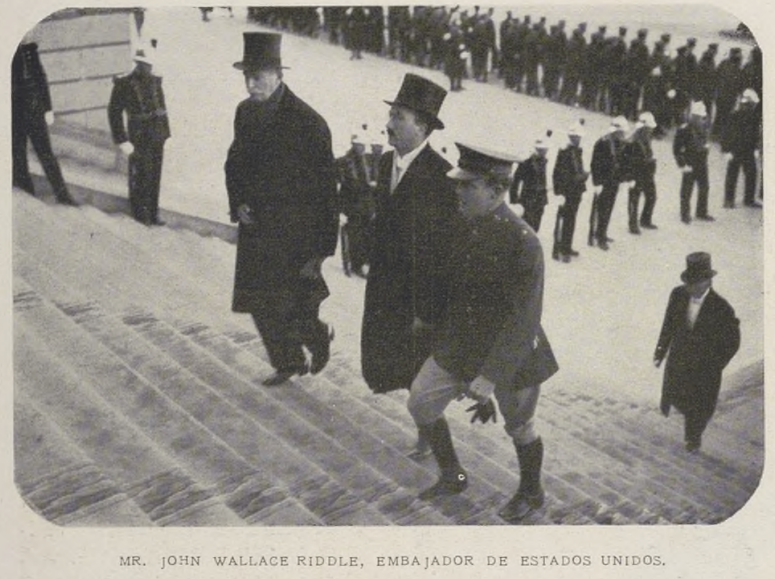
John Wallace Riddle in Argentina in 1925.

== Personal life ==
Born in Philadelphia, Riddle was the son of John Wallace Riddle, Sr. and Rebecca Blair McClure; he was born after his father's untimely death. A few years later, Rebecca McClure became the second wife of Charles Eugene Flandrau and relocated to St. Paul, Minnesota where Riddle grew up alongside two half-brothers and two step-sisters. He graduated from Harvard in 1887, attended law school at Columbia through 1890, and studied international law, diplomacy, and languages at École Libre des Sciences Politiques and the Collège de France in Paris through 1893.

On May 6, 1916 Riddle married American architect and heiress Theodate Pope Riddle.

He died in Farmington, Connecticut, at the age of 77.

Diplomatic posts
Preceded by George von Lengerke Meyer	United States Ambassador to Russia; 1906–1909	Succeeded by William Woodville Rockhill
Preceded by Frederic Jesup Stimson	United States Ambassador to Argentina; 1921–1925	Succeeded by Peter A. Jay
