= Horace G. Knowles =

American lawyer (1863–1937)

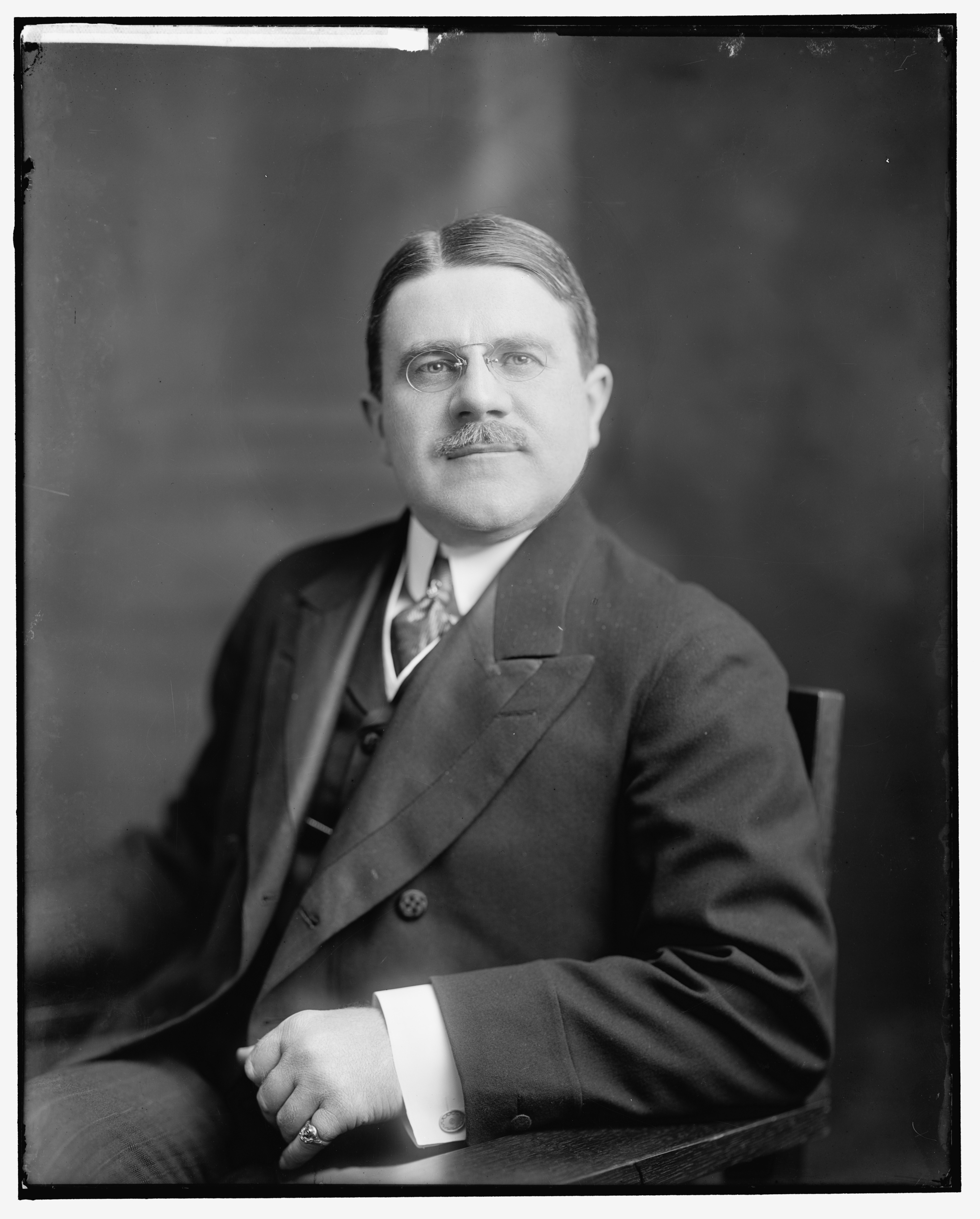

United States Ambassador to Romania
- In office May 7, 1907 – February 4, 1909
- President: Theodore Roosevelt
- Preceded by: John W. Riddle
- Succeeded by: Huntington Wilson

United States Ambassador to Bulgaria
- In office August 21, 1907 – February 4, 1909
- President: Theodore Roosevelt
- Preceded by: John Brinkerhoff Jackson
- Succeeded by: Spencer F. Eddy

United States Ambassador to Serbia
- In office January 16, 1907 – February 4, 1909
- President: Theodore Roosevelt
- Preceded by: John W. Riddle
- Succeeded by: John R. Carter

United States Ambassador to the Dominican Republic
- In office March 7, 1910 – August 2, 1910
- President: William Howard Taft
- Preceded by: Fenton R. McCreery
- Succeeded by: William W. Russell

United States Ambassador to Bolivia
- In office December 28, 1910 – August 23, 1913
- President: William Howard Taft; Woodrow Wilson
- Preceded by: James F. Stutesman
- Succeeded by: John D. O'Rear

Personal details
- Born: Horace Greeley Knowles; October 20, 1863 Seaford, Delaware, U.S.
- Died: November 2, 1937 (aged 74) Manhattan, New York City, U.S.
- Resting place: Arlington Cemetery; Drexel Hill, Pennsylvania, U.S.
- Party: Republican
- Spouse: Edith E. Wallace (m. 1897)
- Education: University of Delaware
- Occupation: Attorney and diplomat

Horace Greeley Knowles (October 20, 1863 – November 2, 1937) was an American attorney and diplomat, who served as an ambassador under three U.S. presidents between 1907 and 1913.

== Early life and education ==
Knowles was born on October 20, 1863, in Seaford, Delaware, the son of Dr. Isaac H. D. Knowles and Sarah Lavinia Short. He attended the University of Delaware and became an attorney in his home state. He married Edith E. Wallace on April 20, 1897, and they had two children.

Knowles became friends with Theodore Roosevelt, who convinced him to enter into the diplomatic corps.

== Public career ==
Knowles served as U.S. Ambassador to Romania, Bulgaria, and Serbia in the final years of Roosevelt's presidency. He was appointed by Roosevelt's successor, William Howard Taft, as the U.S. Ambassador to the Dominican Republic and later as the U.S. Ambassador to Bolivia – a post he held through the early months of the Woodrow Wilson's administration.

For a period, Knowles remained active in Republican politics: during the 1928 presidential election he campaigned actively for Herbert Hoover, warning that if Democratic nominee Al Smith were victorious, the nation would experience high unemployment and widespread depression.

After leaving the foreign service, Knowles returned to practicing law, and appeared often before the United States Court of Claims.

== Retirement and death ==
In the 1920s, Knowles became "a consistent critic of the policy of the United States in Central America, the Dominican Republic, and Haiti". He was also a critic of the Second Italo-Abyssinian War, and became treasurer of the "Committee for Ethiopia", conducting a fundraising drive that collected over $1 million for medical aid to the Ethiopians.

Knowles spent his final years in the Manhattan borough of New York City, New York, living at 145 East 46th Street. He died there in his sleep on the night of November 2, 1937, of a heart ailment. He was interred at Arlington Cemetery, in Drexel Hill, Pennsylvania.

== See also ==
- List of people from New York City
- List of University of Delaware people

Diplomatic posts
Preceded by John W. Riddle	United States Ambassador to Romania; 1907–1909	Succeeded by Huntington Wilson
Preceded by John W. Riddle	United States Ambassador to Serbia; 1907–1909	Succeeded by John Ridgely Carter
