= List of ambassadors of the United States to Bulgaria =

Ambassador of the United States to Bulgaria
- Seal of the United States Department of State

- Flag of a United States ambassador

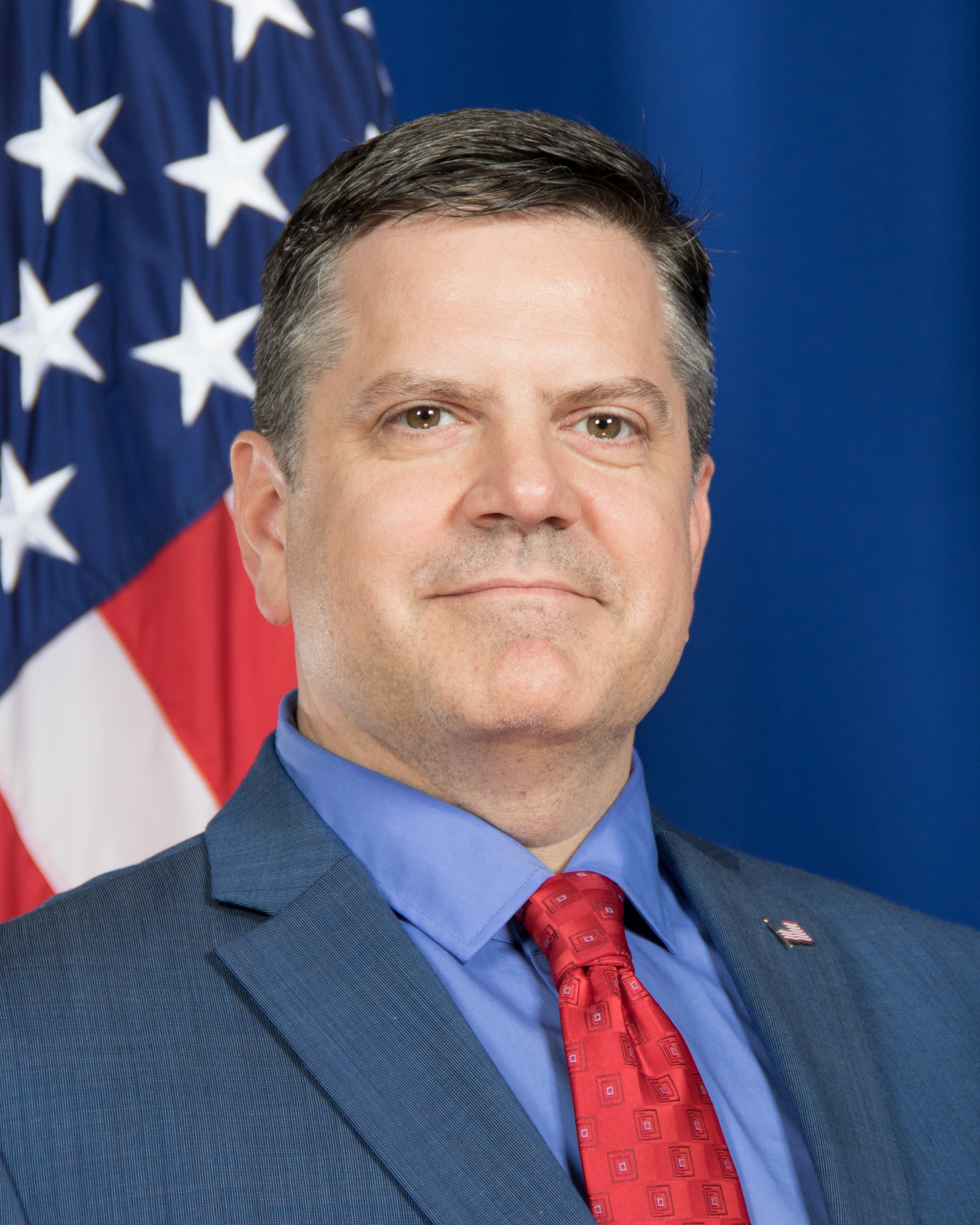
- Incumbent; H. Martin McDowell; Chargé d'affaires since May 16, 2025
- Nominator: The president of the United States
- Appointer: The president; with Senate advice and consent
- Inaugural holder: Charles M. Dickinson as Agent
- Formation: April 24, 1901
- Website: U.S. Embassy - Sofia

The United States ambassador to Bulgaria (Bulgarian: Посланик на САЩ в България) is the ambassador extraordinary and plenipotentiary from the United States to Bulgaria.

== Ambassadors ==
=== Diplomatic agent ===
Name	Appointed	Presented credentials	End of term
Charles M. Dickinson (Note: Appointed to Bulgaria was in addition to assignment as Consul General at Constantinople, where Dickinson resided. No record has been found of Presented credentials at Sofia. Commissioned during a recess of the Senate.)	April 24, 1901		Appointed terminated, June 30, 1903 (Note: Dickinson became persona non grata after some very strong representations in Fall 1901 and was recommissioned after confirmation on December 10, 1901)
John Brinkerhoff Jackson (Note: Commissioned as Envoy Extraordinary and Minister Plenipotentiary to Greece, Romania, and Serbia and Diplomatic Agent in Bulgaria; resident at Athens. Commissioned during a recess of the Senate; recommissioned after confirmation on November 16, 1903.)	June 5, 1903	September 19, 1903	Recommissioned to a different combination of countries
John Brinkerhoff Jackson (Note: Commissioned as Envoy Extraordinary and Minister Plenipotentiary to Greece and Montenegro and Diplomatic Agent in Bulgaria; resident at Athens.)	March 8, 1905		Presented recall, June 4, 1907
Horace G. Knowles (Note: Commissioned as Envoy Extraordinary and Minister Plenipotentiary to Romania and Serbia and Diplomatic Agent in Bulgaria; resident at Bucharest.) (Note: Commissioned during a recess of the Senate; recommissioned after confirmation on December 12, 1907.)	July 1, 1907	August 21, 1907	Left Bucharest, February 4, 1909
Huntington Wilson (Note: Commissioned as Envoy Extraordinary and Minister Plenipotentiary to Romania and Serbia and Diplomatic Agent in Bulgaria; took oath of office, but did not proceed to post.)	December 17, 1908	January 11, 1909	
Spencer F. Eddy (Note: Commissioned as Envoy Extraordinary and Minister Plenipotentiary to Romania and Diplomatic Agent in Bulgaria; served at Bucharest, but did not present credentials in Bulgaria.)	January 11, 1909		
John R. Carter (Note: Commissioned during a recess of the Senate as Envoy Extraordinary and Minister Plenipotentiary to Romania and Serbia and Diplomatic Agent in Bulgaria; served at Bucharest, but did not present credentials in Bulgaria. Recommissioned after confirmation on December 13, 1909.)	September 25, 1909	October 24, 1911	October 24, 1911

=== Envoy extraordinary and minister plenipotentiary ===
Name	Career	Appointed	Presented credentials	End of term
John R. Carter (Note: Commissioned as Envoy Extraordinary and Minister Plenipotentiary to Romania, Serbia, and Bulgaria; resident at Bucharest.)		June 24, 1910		
John Brinkerhoff Jackson		August 12, 1911	February 1, 1912	Presented recall, October 18, 1913
Lewis Einstein (Note: Commissioned as Special Agent with rank of Chargé d’Affaires; resident at Sofia.)	Foreign Service officer	October 1915		June 1916
Charles J. Vopicka (Note: Commissioned as Envoy Extraordinary and Minister Plenipotentiary to Romania, Serbia, and Bulgaria; resident at Bucharest. Charles S. Wilson presented credentials March 18, 1919, as Chargé d'Affaires ad interim at Sofia and served as such until July 1921.)	Non-career appointee	September 11, 1913	December 26, 1913	Relieved of active functions pertaining to Legation Sofia, December 17, 1918
Charles S. Wilson	Foreign Service officer	October 8, 1921	December 5, 1921	Presented recall, October 4, 1928
H. F. Arthur Schoenfeld (Note: Commissioned during a recess of the Senate; recommissioned after confirmation on January 23, 1929; did not serve under either Appointed.)	Foreign Service officer	July 17, 1928		
Henry Wharton Shoemaker	Non-career appointee	January 22, 1930	March 28, 1930	Left post, August 2, 1933
Frederick A. Sterling (Note: Commissioned during a recess of the Senate; recommissioned after confirmation on January 15, 1934.)	Foreign Service officer	September 1, 1933	April 3, 1934	Left post, June 30, 1936
Ray Atherton	Foreign Service officer	July 13, 1937	October 21, 1937	Left post, July 5, 1939
George H. Earle III (Note: Earle left post late in Dec. 1941, arriving at Istanbul (en route to the U.S.) December 27, 1941. Legation Sofia was reestablished September 27, 1947, with John Evarts Horner as Chargé d'Affaires ad interim.)	Non-career appointee	February 14, 1940	April 2, 1940	Bulgaria declared war on the U.S. on the 13 December 1941
Donald R. Heath (Note: Commissioned during a recess of the Senate; recommissioned after confirmation on December 9, 1947. The Department of State announced on February 21, 1950, the suspension of diplomatic relations with Bulgaria; Heath left post, February 24, 1950.)	Foreign Service officer	September 30, 1947	November 8, 1947	Declared persona non grata by Government of Bulgaria, January 19, 1950
Edward Page, Jr. (Note: Commissioned during a recess of the Senate; recommissioned after confirmation on January 21, 1960.)	Foreign Service officer	November 23, 1959	March 14, 1960	Left post, May 25, 1962
Eugenie Anderson	Non-career appointee	May 28, 1962	August 3, 1962	Left post, December 6, 1964
Nathaniel Davis	Foreign Service officer	May 6, 1965	June 4, 1965	Left post, May 20, 1966
John M. McSweeney	Foreign Service officer	September 16, 1966	October 26, 1966	Promoted to Ambassador Extraordinary and Plenipotentiary

=== Ambassador extraordinary and plenipotentiary ===
Name	Career	Appointed	Presented credentials	End of term
John M. McSweeney (Note: Legation Sofia had been raised to Embassy status November 28, 1966 with Minister McSweeney in charge pending his own promotion to the rank of Ambassador Extraordinary and Plenipotentiary.)	Foreign Service officer	April 5, 1967	April 19, 1967	Left post, May 29, 1970
Horace G. Torbert, Jr.	Foreign Service officer	October 6, 1970	November 4, 1970	Left post, January 23, 1973
Martin F. Herz	Foreign Service officer	February 28, 1974	April 3, 1974	Left post, August 6, 1977
Raymond L. Garthoff	Foreign Service officer	July 29, 1977	September 16, 1977	Left post, October 9, 1979
Jack Richard Perry	Foreign Service officer	September 20, 1979	October 17, 1979	Left post, September 27, 1981
Robert L. Barry	Foreign Service officer	November 25, 1981	December 8, 1981	July 12, 1984
Melvyn Levitsky	Foreign Service officer	September 21, 1984	November 13, 1984	Left post, February 6, 1987
Sol Polansky	Foreign Service officer	June 15, 1987	September 4, 1987	Left post, August 17, 1990
Hugh Kenneth Hill	Foreign Service officer	August 6, 1990	September 18, 1990	Left post, September 5, 1993
William Dale Montgomery	Foreign Service officer	October 8, 1993	October 27, 1993	Left post, January 17, 1996
Avis T. Bohlen	Foreign Service officer	July 2, 1996	September 5, 1996	Left post August 13, 1999
Richard Monroe Miles	Foreign Service officer	August 9, 1999	September 8, 1999	Left post February 28, 2002
James W. Pardew	Foreign Service officer	April 1, 2002	May 13, 2002	Left post, July 30, 2005
John Beyrle	Foreign Service officer	July 9, 2005	September 8, 2005	April 28, 2008
Nancy McEldowney	Foreign Service officer	May 2, 2008	August 26, 2008	July 30, 2009
James B. Warlick, Jr.	Foreign Service officer	December 24, 2009	January 19, 2010	September 14, 2012
Marcie Berman Ries	Foreign Service officer	May 24, 2012	October 1, 2012	July 28, 2015
Eric S. Rubin	Foreign Service officer	December 9, 2015	January 27, 2016	July 9, 2019
Herro Mustafa	Foreign Service officer	September 29, 2019	October 18, 2019	March 1, 2023
Kenneth H. Merten	Foreign Service officer	December 13, 2022	April 7, 2023	January 29, 2025

== See also ==
- Bulgaria - United States relations
- Foreign relations of Bulgaria
- Ambassadors of the United States
- Bulgarian Ambassador to the United States
