= Jablonná =

- Municipality
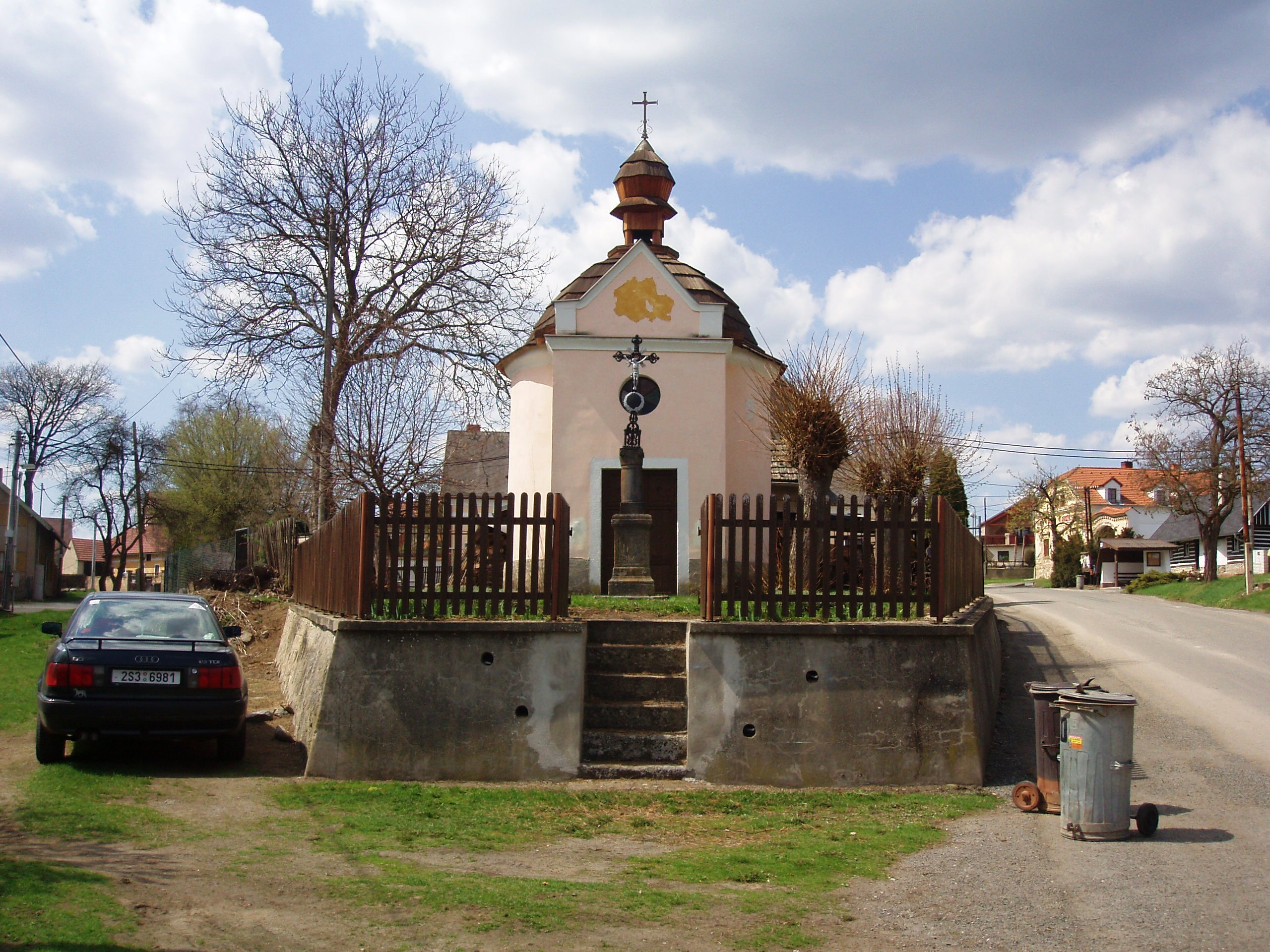
- Horní Hbity, a part of Jablonná

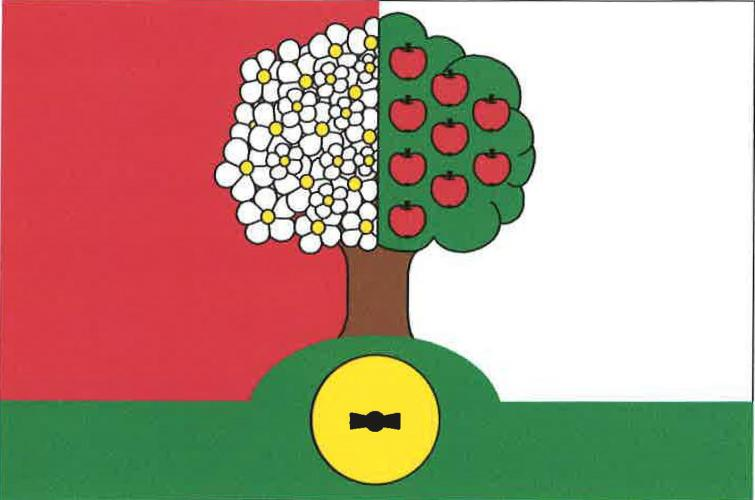
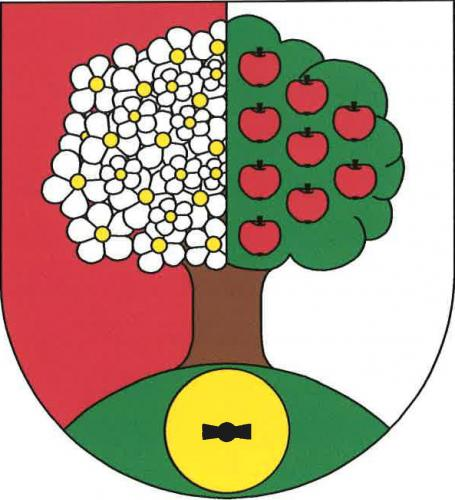
- Flag Coat of arms

- Location in the Czech Republic
- Coordinates: 49°39′40″N 14°8′19″E
- Country: Czech Republic
- Region: Central Bohemian
- District: Příbram
- First mentioned: 1603

Area
  - Total: 7.70 km^{2} (2.97 sq mi)
- Elevation: 464 m (1,522 ft)

Population (2026-01-01)
  - Total: 419
  - Density: 54.4/km^{2} (141/sq mi)
- Time zone: UTC+1 (CET)
  - Summer (DST): UTC+2 (CEST)
- Postal code: 262 63
- Website: www.jablonna.cz

Jablonná is a municipality and village in Příbram District in the Central Bohemian Region of the Czech Republic. It has about 400 inhabitants.

== Administrative division ==
Jablonná consists of two municipal parts (in brackets population according to the 2021 census):

- Jablonná (289)
- Horní Hbity (116)

== Demographics ==
Historical population
Year	Pop.	±%
1869	643	—
1880	684	+6.4%
1890	707	+3.4%
1900	729	+3.1%
1910	736	+1.0%
1921	679	−7.7%
1930	600	−11.6%
1950	453	−24.5%
1961	451	−0.4%
1970	419	−7.1%
1980	375	−10.5%
1991	321	−14.4%
2001	335	+4.4%
2011	359	+7.2%
2021	405	+12.8%
Source: Censuses
