= Matthew Baird Mansion =

Historic house in Pennsylvania, United States

- U.S. National Register of Historic Places
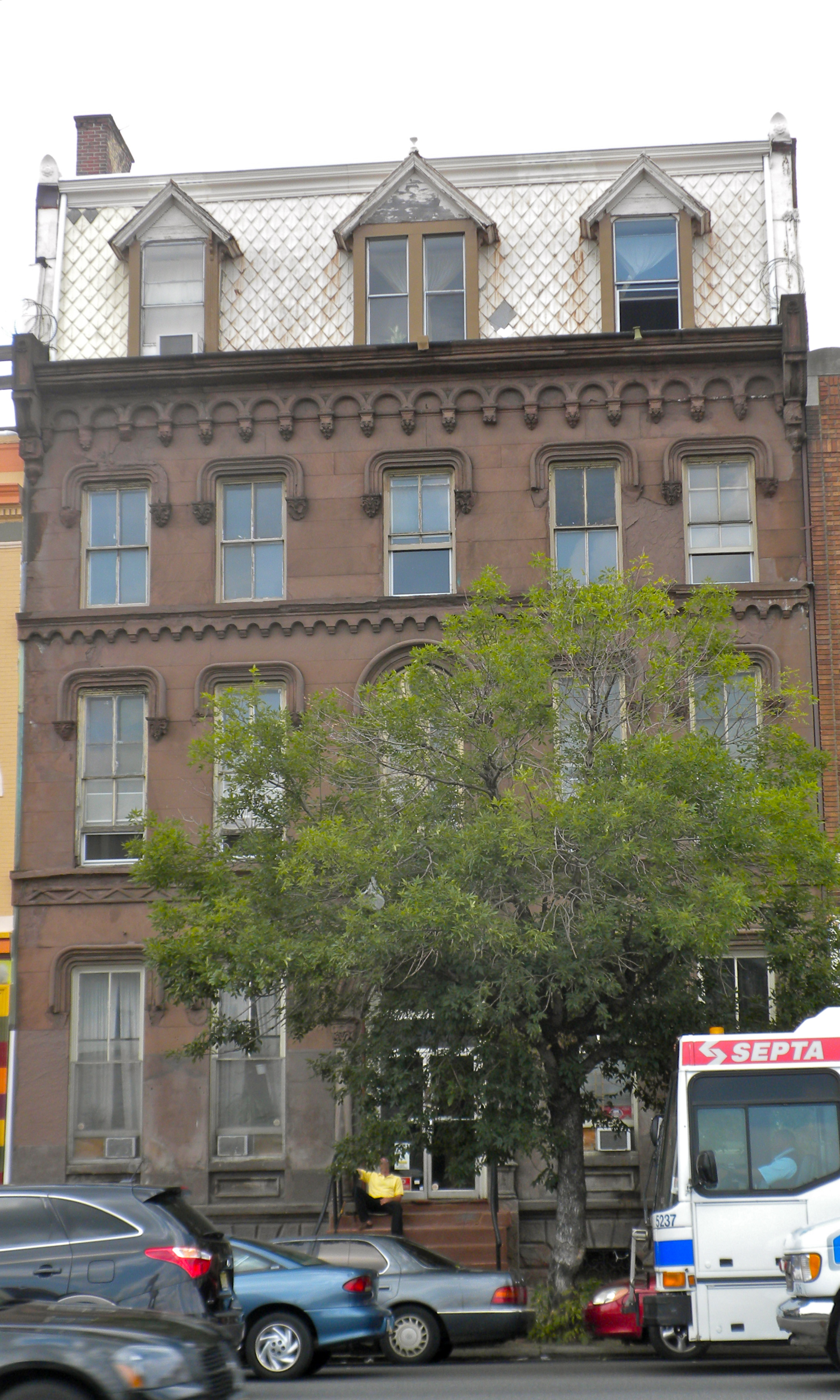
- Matthew Baird Mansion, August 2010

- Location within Philadelphia Location within Pennsylvania Location within the United States
- Location: 814 N. Broad St., Philadelphia, Pennsylvania
- Coordinates: 39°58′30″N 75°9′33″W
- Area: 0.1 acres (0.040 ha)
- Built: 1863-1864
- Architectural style: Late Victorian
- NRHP reference No.: 83004241
- Added to NRHP: December 29, 1983

The Matthew Baird Mansion is an historic home, now apartment building, that is located at 814 N. Broad Street, in the Francisville neighborhood of Philadelphia, Pennsylvania.

It was added to the National Register of Historic Places in 1983.

== History and architectural features ==
Built between 1863 and 1864, this historic structure is a four-story, five-bay, brownstone-faced, brick building with nineteen rooms. Designed in a Late Victorian style, the mansion consists of the main building, an attached, three-story, brick-back building, and a two-story, brick stable. It was built by Matthew Baird (1817–1877), one of the early partners in the Baldwin Locomotive Works.
