= Martin F. Herz =

American diplomat

Martin Florian Herz
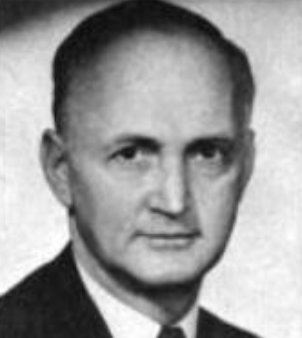
- Martin F. Herz, from a 1962 publication of the U.S. State Department

United States Ambassador to Bulgaria
- In office April 3, 1974 – August 6, 1977
- President: Richard Nixon; Gerald Ford

Personal details
- Born: July 9, 1917 New York City, New York, U.S.
- Died: October 6, 1983 (aged 66) Georgetown University, Washington D.C.

Martin Florian Herz (July 9, 1917 – October 6, 1983) was an American diplomat who served as the United States Ambassador to Bulgaria from April 3, 1974, to August 6, 1977.

== Early life ==
Martin Florian Herz was born on July 9, 1917, in New York City, the son of Gustave L. and Edith Flammerschein Herz.

== Early career and military service ==
In 1937, Herz received a bachelor of science degree from Columbia University. During World War Two, Herz served in the Army, rising from the rank of Private to Major. He was given the Purple Heart and the Bronze Star for his bravery during the Battle of Anzio.

== United States Foreign Service ==
In 1946, he entered the United States Foreign Service. Between 1946 and 1948, he served as third secretary at the United States embassy in Vienna, Austria. Between 1950 and 1954, he served as second secretary at the United States embassy in Paris, France. Between 1955 and 1956, he served as second secretary at the United States embassy in Phnom Penh, Cambodia, before being promoted to first secretary there, which he served as from 1956 to 1957. Between 1957 and 1959, he served as first secretary at the United States embassy in Tokyo, Japan. Between 1963 and 1967 he served in Tehran, Iran as political counselor. During his time there he published a report titled "Some Intangible Factors in Iranian Politics", which warned of the instability of the regime of Mohammed Reza Pahlevi.

== Ambassador to Bulgaria (1974-1977) ==
In 1974, Herz was nominated by President Gerald Ford as the United States ambassador to Bulgaria. He served as ambassador to Bulgaria until 1977, when he retired from the United States Foreign Service.

== Later years and death ==
In 1978, Herz became director of Georgetown University's Institute for the Study of Diplomacy. He served in that position until his death from cancer on October 6, 1983.
