= Herro Mustafa =

Kurdish-American diplomat (born 1973)

- هێرۆ مستەفا
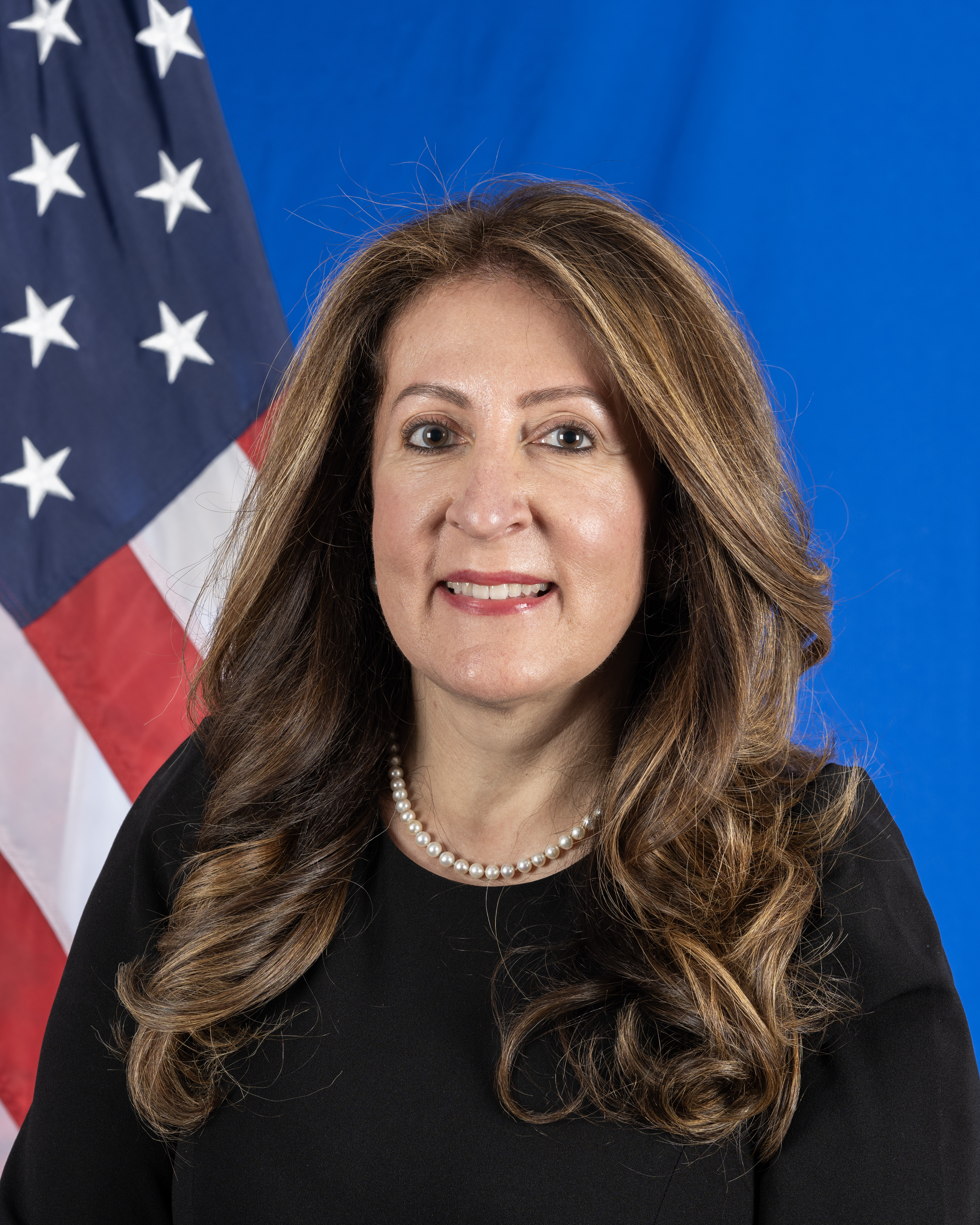

United States Ambassador to Egypt
- In office November 15, 2023 – January 17, 2026
- President: Joe Biden; Donald Trump
- Preceded by: Jonathan R. Cohen

United States Ambassador to Bulgaria
- In office October 18, 2019 – March 1, 2023
- President: Donald Trump; Joe Biden
- Preceded by: Eric S. Rubin
- Succeeded by: Kenneth H. Merten

Deputy Chief of Mission at the United States Embassy in Portugal
- In office July 2016 – September 26, 2019
- President: Barack Obama; Donald Trump
- Succeeded by: Kristin M. Kane

United States chargé d'affaires to Portugal
- In office January 20, 2017 – August 25, 2017
- President: Donald Trump
- Preceded by: Robert A. Sherman (as ambassador)
- Succeeded by: George Edward Glass (as ambassador)

Coalition Provisional Authority Coordinator for Nineveh
- In office May 2003 – June 2004
- Preceded by: Misha'an al-Juburi
- Succeeded by: Usama Yousif Kashmula (Interim Governor)

Personal details
- Born: 1973 (age 52–53) Erbil, Iraq
- Education: Georgetown University; Princeton University

Herro Kader Mustafa Garg (Kurdish: Hêro Mistefa; born 1973) is a Kurdish-American diplomat who had served as the United States ambassador to Egypt. She served as the United States ambassador to Bulgaria from October 2019 to March 2023.

== Early life and education ==
Mustafa was born in Erbil, in Kurdistan Region, Iraq, to a Kurdish family and spent two years of her childhood in a refugee camp. Mustafa's family story was the subject of the documentary film American Herro. She is multilingual and speaks English, Kurdish, Arabic, Turkish, Spanish and Greek.

Mustafa's family sought asylum in the United States in 1976. Her father was a Kurdish political activist and an opponent of the regime of Saddam Hussein. The family was taken in by Zion Lutheran Church at Minot, North Dakota, in 1976.

Mustafa graduated from Minot High School in 1991 and earned her undergraduate degree from the Edmund A. Walsh School of Foreign Service at Georgetown University in 1995 where she studied national security and the Middle East. She also received a master's degree in international relations from the Woodrow Wilson School of Public and International Affairs at Princeton University in 1997.

== Career ==
After graduation, she directed a non-governmental organization for Kurdish studies in the U.S., traveled to Bosnia to supervise provincial elections and served as the Senior Editor for the Emirates Center for Strategic Studies and Research in Abu Dhabi, United Arab Emirates.

Mustafa joined the United States Foreign Service in 1999 and served in Athens (as a Political Officer for human rights and trafficking), Beirut (as a consular official), Washington, D.C. (as Iran desk officer at the National Security Council under Elliott Abrams), and special assistant to Secretary of State Condoleezza Rice and Under Secretary of State for Political Affairs William J. Burns, and Iraq (as Coalition Provisional Authority coordinator for Nineveh under L. Paul Bremer).

Mustafa was senior advisor on the Middle East to Vice President Joe Biden from March 2009 to 2011.

Mustafa once served as political minister counselor at the United States embassy in India, and has been Deputy Chief of Mission at the United States Embassy in Portugal from July 2016 to January 2017.

She carries the rank of Minister Counselor.

=== United States ambassador to Portugal ===
Mustafa was United States chargée d'affaires in Portugal (i.e. acting ambassador) from the end of Robert A. Sherman's term as Ambassador on January 20, 2017 to August 25, 2017, when she was replaced by George Edward Glass also as ambassador. She drew notice for being a Muslim former refugee serving the Donald Trump administration.

=== United States ambassador to Bulgaria ===
In June 2019, President Donald Trump nominated Mustafa to be the United States ambassador to Bulgaria. Her nomination was unanimously confirmed by the Senate on September 26, 2019. She presented her credentials to President Rumen Radev on October 18, 2019. She served until March 1, 2023.

=== United States ambassador to Egypt ===
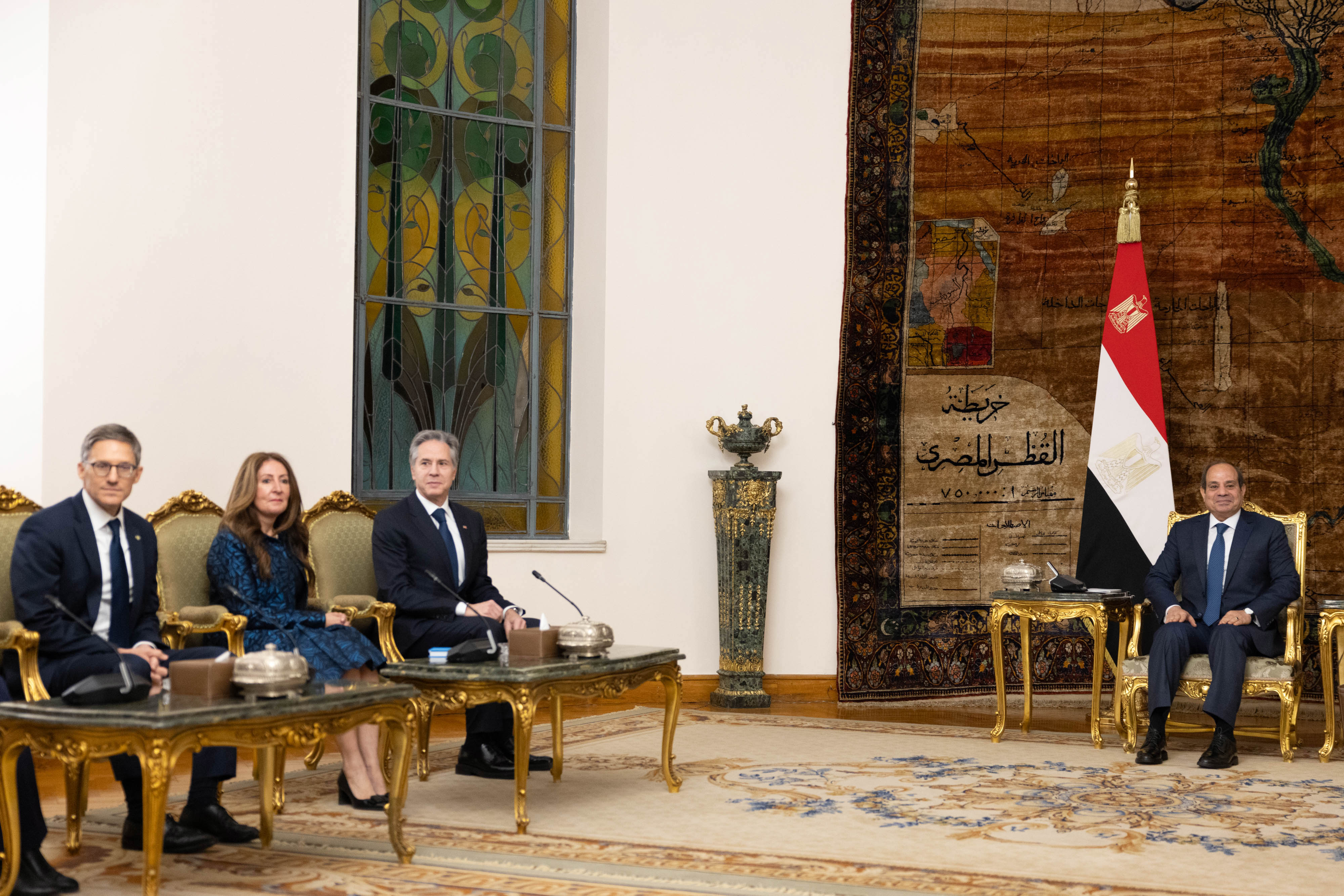
Herro Mustafa-Garg with U.S. Secretary of State Antony Blinken at meeting with Egyptian President El-Sisi in 2024

On March 29, 2023, President Joe Biden nominated her to serve as the U.S. ambassador to Egypt. On October 25, 2023, her nomination was reported out of the Senate Foreign Relations Committee. Her nomination was confirmed by voice vote on November 1, 2023. She was sworn in on November 7, 2023. She presented her credentials on November 15, 2023.

== Awards and recognition ==
Mustafa has been nominated for the Department of State Human Rights and Democracy Achievement award and has received the Superior Honor Award and Meritorious Honor Award for her work.

In 2021, Mustafa was named by Carnegie Corporation of New York as an honoree of the Great Immigrants Award.

== Personal life ==
She is married to Ravneesh Garg with whom she has had two daughters, Ariana and Ashna.

Diplomatic posts
| Preceded by Eric S. Rubin | United States Ambassador to Bulgaria; 2019–2023 | Succeeded by Kenneth H. Merten |
| Preceded by A. Elizabeth Jones; Chargé d'Affaires | United States Ambassador to Egypt; 2023–2026 | Vacant |
