= Right to Rise =

Political action committee for Jeb Bush

- Formation: January 6, 2015
- Type: Super PAC
- Legal status: Inactive
- Purpose: Elect Jeb Bush as President
- Leader: Jeb Bush (2015); Mike Murphy (2015–2016)
- Budget: $100 million (August 2015)

Right to Rise is a political action committee (PAC) created to support Jeb Bush in the 2016 presidential election. A Super PAC, Right to Rise is permitted to raise and spend unlimited amounts of corporate, union, and individual campaign contributions under the terms of the Citizens United Supreme Court decision.

== History ==
The creation of the Super PAC was announced on January 6, 2015, by Bush. According to Bush, the name was inspired by Congressman Paul Ryan and 1996 Republican vice presidential candidate Jack Kemp. Bush's campaign strategy would "commence with six months of fundraising for the Right to Rise super PAC and enough muscle to push aside Mitt Romney". Bush personally raised money for the Super PAC prior to the official announcement of his candidacy.

Bush officially announced his candidacy in June 2015, at which point Mike Murphy took over leadership of Right to Rise. The Bush campaign planned to leave Right to Rise in charge of television and digital advertising efforts, while the Bush campaign would take charge of voter outreach.

Through July 2015, Bush's campaign and Super PAC had raised over $114 million, which gave "Bush a sizable financial advantage over more than a dozen GOP rivals and over Democratic front-runner Hillary Rodham Clinton". Bush rewarded top donors by inviting them to a donor retreat in Kennebunkport, hosted at his parents' estate in Walker's Point. By August 2015, Right to Rise had raised over $100 million.

=== Criticism ===
In spring of 2015, donors were concerned "that focusing so much on filling the super PAC's coffers might leave the campaign cash-poor"; yet the Bush campaign initially built "out a massive campaign with ballot-access teams working every state and senior staffers earning more than $200,000 annual salaries" and "hired scores of policy aides". Once Danny Diaz became the Bush campaign manager in June 2015, "he went on a cost-cutting spree — implementing painful across-the-board cuts that affected staffers at nearly every corner of the campaign".

The "tens of millions of dollars in ad buys" from Right to Rise failed to raise Bush's standing in polls, while Trump managed to generate tremendous free media exposure. Eleven of 16 major donors were also unhappy with Right to Rise's spending on the Bush campaign, including "stays at boutique hotels featuring rooftop pools, private soirees at members-only, jacket-and-tie clubs and fundraisers at the Four Seasons, the St. Regis and the Mandarin Oriental", private planes, and "big spending on staff". By contrast rival Ted Cruz resorted to cheaper options like Holiday Inn and budget airlines.

In the summer of 2015, Mike Murphy explained his strategy: "If other campaigns wish that we're going to uncork money on Donald Trump, they'll be disappointed. ... Trump is, frankly, other people's problem". Later in 2015, Murphy further explained that the PAC's strategy was based on the assumption that Trump's campaign would inevitably fail, and so the PAC would instead concentrate on defeating other GOP candidates, "candidates in our lane that we can overcome." However, Murphy's decision to target GOP establishment candidates Marco Rubio and Ohio Governor John Kasich, instead of Donald Trump, created dissatisfaction among some major donors to the PAC. Kasich's strategist was quoted as saying "Their super PAC ran a tough campaign, they ran a lot of negative ads. We had to disavow some of the things that our super PAC ran, so I'm sure that Jeb Bush -- I wouldn't speak for him, clearly -- might do things differently if he was in control of his super PAC. I have no idea." In addition, the Super PAC's "decision to emphasize Bush's government experience in a year when voters clearly were looking for outsider cred and a candidate who could channel anger at the establishment" was seen as a wrong strategy.

Stephen F. Hayes of The Weekly Standard offered this assessment of Right to Rise in January 2016:

Trump has had few better allies than Right to Rise, the super PAC supporting Bush's candidacy. There will be plenty of blame to go around if Trump ends up as the Republican nominee, but Right to Rise will have earned a prominent chapter in those histories. ... Right to Rise, like an all-pro right guard, helped clear a path for Trump by blocking several of his would-be tacklers, in particular Marco Rubio. This was no accident. It was the plan.

=== Defeat ===
Bush ultimately suspended his run on February 20, 2016, shortly after the South Carolina primary.

This was Murphy's second time that he had managed an expensive campaign loss. Murphy's first failure was Meg Whitman's $177 million campaign where she was defeated in the 2010 California gubernatorial election by Democrat Jerry Brown who spent $36 million.

== Contributors ==
The following contributors donated over $1 million to Right to Rise.

- Mike Fernandez
- Francis Rooney
- Bernard Marcus
- William Oberndorf
- Helen Schwab
- Robert Day
- Julian Robertson
- Charles B. Johnson
- Richard Kinder
- Nancy Kinder
- Thomas F. Stephenson
- Al Hoffman Jr.
- Bradford M. Freeman
- Hushang Ansary
- Shahla Ansary
- Ray Lee Hunt
- Nancy Hunt
- Raul Rodriguez
- Chris Cline
- Louis Bacon
- Trevor Rees-Jones
- Jan Rees-Jones
