= List of ambassadors of the United States to Portugal =

Ambassador of the United States to Portugal
- Seal of the United States Department of State

- Flag of a United States ambassador

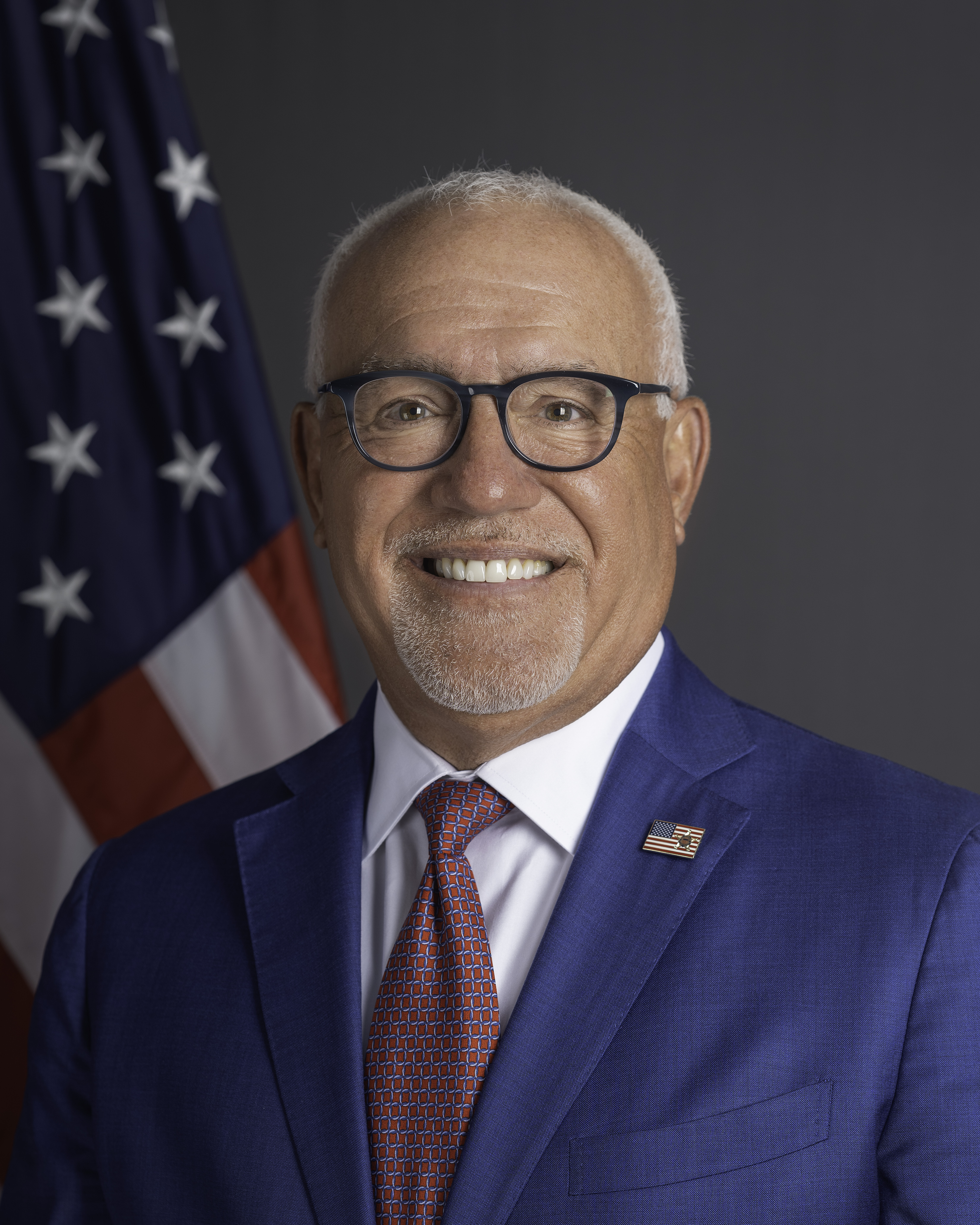
- Incumbent; John Arrigo since September 30, 2025
- Nominator: The president of the United States
- Appointer: The president; with Senate advice and consent
- Inaugural holder: David Humphreys as Minister Resident
- Formation: February 21, 1791
- Website: U.S. Embassy - Lisbon

Bilateral diplomatic relations between the United States and Portugal date from the earliest years of the United States. Following the Revolutionary War, Portugal was the first neutral country to recognize the United States. On February 21, 1791, President George Washington opened formal diplomatic relations, naming Col. David Humphreys as U.S. Minister Resident. Subsequent envoys were given the title Minister Plenipotentiary.

== Chiefs of mission ==
Denotes Chargé d’Affaires ad interim	Denotes that Chief of Mission served at the court of Portugal in Brazil; resident at Rio de Janeiro

Name	Portrait	State of residency	Type of appointee	Title	Appointment	Presentation of credentials	Termination of mission
David Humphreys		Connecticut		Minister Resident	February 21, 1791	May 13, 1791	Presented recall on July 25, 1797
William Loughton Smith		South Carolina		Minister Plenipotentiary	July 10, 1797	September 8, 1797	Presented recall on September 9, 1801
Thomas Sumter Jr.		South Carolina		Minister Plenipotentiary	March 7, 1809	June 7, 1810	Presented recall on July 24, 1819
John Graham		Pennsylvania, Virginia		Minister Plenipotentiary	January 6, 1819	June 24, 1819	Left Rio de Janeiro June 13, 1820
John James Appleton		Massachusetts		Chargé d'Affaires ad interim		Began Service June 1820	Appleton's last despatch was dated July 12, 1821 (the Legation to Portugal at Rio de Janeiro was closed in 1821)
Henry Dearborn Sr.		Massachusetts		Envoy Extraordinary and Minister Plenipotentiary	May 7, 1822	Arrived at Lisbon before August 16, 1822; did not report date of presentation of credentials	Had farewell audience June 30, 1824
Thomas Ludwell Lee Brent		Virginia		Chargé d'Affaires	March 9, 1825	June 24, 1825	Left post on or soon after November 28, 1834
Edward Kavanaugh		Maine		Chargé d'Affaires	March 3, 1835	July 25, 1835	Relinquished charge April 19, 1841
Washington Barrow		Mississippi		Chargé d'Affaires	August 16, 1841	December 28, 1841	Presented recall on February 24, 1844
Abraham Rencher		North Carolina		Chargé d'Affaires	September 22, 1843	February 24, 1844	Presented recall on November 4, 1847
George Washington Hopkins		Virginia		Chargé d'Affaires	March 3, 1847	November 4, 1847	Presented recall on October 18, 1849
James Brown Clay		Kentucky		Chargé d'Affaires	August 1, 1849	October 18, 1849	Left post on August 19, 1850
Charles Brickett Haddock		New Hampshire		Chargé d'Affaires	December 10, 1850	June 17, 1851	Presented recall on June 16, 1854
John Louis O'Sullivan		New York		Chargé d'Affaires	February 16, 1854	June 16, 1854	Promoted to Minister Resident October 19, 1854
John Louis O'Sullivan		New York		Minister Resident	June 29, 1854	October 19, 1854	Presented recall on July 15, 1858
George Washington Morgan		Ohio		Minister Resident	May 11, 1858	July 15, 1858	Presented recall on July 19, 1861
James E. Harvey		Pennsylvania		Minister Resident	March 28, 1861	July 19, 1861	Presented recall on July 15, 1869
Samuel Shellabarger		Ohio		Minister Resident	April 21, 1869	July 15, 1869	Relinquished charge January 1, 1870
Charles Hance Lewis		Virginia		Minister Resident	March 15, 1870	June 15, 1870	Presented recall on April 8, 1875
Benjamin Moran		Pennsylvania		Minister Resident	December 15, 1874	April 8, 1875	Presented recall on November 9, 1876
Benjamin Moran		Pennsylvania		Chargé d'Affaires	August 15, 1876	November 15, 1876	Recall presented by successor September 27, 1882
John Morgan Francis		New York		Minister Resident/Consul General	July 7, 1882	October 5, 1882	Left post on August 25, 1884
Lewis Richmond		Rhode Island		Minister Resident/Consul General	July 4, 1884	October 23, 1884	Presented recall on May 7, 1885
Edward Parke Custis Lewis		New Jersey		Minister Resident/Consul General	April 2, 1885	June 18, 1885	Presented recall on June 14, 1889
George Bailey Loring		Massachusetts		Minister Resident/Consul General	March 30, 1889	August 29, 1889	Left post on May 31, 1890
George Sherman Batcheller		New York		Minister Resident/Consul General	October 1, 1890	December 30, 1890	Left post on August 17, 1892
Gilbert Ashville Pierce		Minnesota		Minister Resident/Consul General	January 6, 1893	March 20, 1893	Presented recall on May 24, 1893
George William Caruth		Arkansas		Envoy Extraordinary and Minister Plenipotentiary	April 25, 1893	June 30, 1893	Presented recall on July 24, 1897
Lawrence Townsend		Pennsylvania		Envoy Extraordinary and Minister Plenipotentiary	June 9, 1897	August 18, 1897	Presented recall on May 29, 1899
John Nichol Irwin		Iowa		Envoy Extraordinary and Minister Plenipotentiary	April 12, 1899	December 26, 1899	Left post on May 15, 1900
Francis Butler Loomis		Ohio		Envoy Extraordinary and Minister Plenipotentiary	June 17, 1901	August 14, 1901	Left post on September 16, 1902
Charles Page Bryan		Illinois		Envoy Extraordinary and Minister Plenipotentiary	January 7, 1903	April 25, 1903	Left post on January 16, 1910
Henry Tifft Gage		California		Envoy Extraordinary and Minister Plenipotentiary	December 21, 1909	June 11, 1910	Normal relations interrupted on October 5, 1910
Edwin Vernon Morgan		New York		Envoy Extraordinary and Minister Plenipotentiary	May 24, 1911	August 3, 1911	Left post on February 11, 1912
Cyrus E. Woods		Pennsylvania		Envoy Extraordinary and Minister Plenipotentiary	January 25, 1912	March 20, 1912	Presented recall on August 19, 1913
Thomas Howard Birch		New Jersey	Non-career appointee	Envoy Extraordinary and Minister Plenipotentiary	September 10, 1913	December 15, 1913	Left post on March 15, 1922
Fred Morris Dearing		Missouri	Career Foreign Service Officer	Envoy Extraordinary and Minister Plenipotentiary	February 10, 1922	June 6, 1922	Relinquished charge February 28, 1930
John Glover South		Kentucky	Non-career appointee	Envoy Extraordinary and Minister Plenipotentiary	December 16, 1929	March 26, 1930	Left post on July 28, 1933
Robert Granville Caldwell		Texas	Non-career appointee	Envoy Extraordinary and Minister Plenipotentiary	June 13, 1933	August 21, 1933	Left post on May 28, 1937
Herbert Claiborne Pell		Rhode Island	Non-career appointee	Envoy Extraordinary and Minister Plenipotentiary	May 27, 1937	July 31, 1937	Left post on February 3, 1941
Bert Fish		Florida	Non-career appointee	Envoy Extraordinary and Minister Plenipotentiary	February 11, 1941	March 26, 1941	Died at post on July 21, 1943
Raymond Henry Norweb		Ohio	Career Foreign Service Officer	Envoy Extraordinary and Minister Plenipotentiary	November 15, 1943	December 3, 1943	Promoted to Ambassador Extraordinary and Plenipotentiary June 20, 1944
Raymond Henry Norweb		Ohio	Career Foreign Service Officer	Ambassador Extraordinary and Plenipotentiary	May 4, 1944	June 20, 1944	Left post on February 15, 1945
Herman Benjamin Baruch		New York	Non-career appointee	Ambassador Extraordinary and Plenipotentiary	February 9, 1945	Officially recognized as of April 12, 1945	Left post on March 9, 1947
John Cooper Wiley		Indiana	Career Foreign Service Officer	Ambassador Extraordinary and Plenipotentiary	April 10, 1947	June 18, 1947	Left post March 15, 1948
Lincoln MacVeagh		Connecticut	Non-career appointee	Ambassador Extraordinary and Plenipotentiary	April 8, 1948	June 9, 1948	Left post on February 26, 1952
Cavendish Wells Cannon		Utah	Career Foreign Service Officer	Ambassador Extraordinary and Plenipotentiary	March 13, 1952	June 2, 1952	Left post on August 1, 1953
M. Robert Guggenheim		District of Columbia	Non-career appointee	Ambassador Extraordinary and Plenipotentiary	June 24, 1953	August 12, 1953	Left post on September 19, 1954
James Cowles Hart Bonbright		New York	Career Foreign Service Officer	Ambassador Extraordinary and Plenipotentiary	January 24, 1955	February 18, 1955	Left post on November 27, 1958
Charles Burke Elbrick		Kentucky	Career Foreign Service Officer	Ambassador Extraordinary and Plenipotentiary	October 29, 1958	January 13, 1959	Left post on August 31, 1963
George Whelan Anderson Jr.		District of Columbia	Non-career appointee	Ambassador Extraordinary and Plenipotentiary	August 1, 1963	October 22, 1963	Left post on June 1, 1966
William Tapley Bennett Jr.		Georgia	Career Foreign Service Officer	Ambassador Extraordinary and Plenipotentiary	May 10, 1966	July 20, 1966	Left Post on July 21, 1969
Ridgway Brewster Knight		District of Columbia	Career Foreign Service Officer	Ambassador Extraordinary and Plenipotentiary	July 8, 1969	July 30, 1969	Left post on February 24, 1973
Ridgway Brewster Knight		New York	Career Foreign Service Officer	Ambassador Extraordinary and Plenipotentiary	July 8, 1969	July 30, 1969	Left post on February 24, 1973
Stuart Nash Scott		New York	Non-career appointee	Ambassador Extraordinary and Plenipotentiary	December 19, 1973	January 23, 1974	Left post on January 12, 1975
Frank Charles Carlucci III		Pennsylvania	Career Foreign Service Officer	Ambassador Extraordinary and Plenipotentiary	December 9, 1974	January 24, 1975	Left post on February 5, 1978
Richard Joseph Bloomfield		Maryland	Career Foreign Service Officer	Ambassador Extraordinary and Plenipotentiary	February 3, 1978	March 10, 1978	Left post on June 10, 1982
Henry Allen Holmes Jr.		District of Columbia	Career Foreign Service Officer	Ambassador Extraordinary and Plenipotentiary	September 23, 1982	October 15, 1982	Left post on June 26, 1985
Frank J. Shakespeare		Connecticut	Non-career appointee	Ambassador Extraordinary and Plenipotentiary	August 2, 1985	October 16, 1985	Left post on October 4, 1986
Edward Morgan Rowell		California	Career Foreign Service Officer	Ambassador Extraordinary and Plenipotentiary	January 19, 1988	January 29, 1988	Left post on March 30, 1990
Everett Ellis Briggs		Maine	Career Foreign Service Officer	Ambassador Extraordinary and Plenipotentiary	April 1, 1990	May 25, 1990	Left post on September 3, 1993
Everett Ellis Briggs		New Hampshire	Career Foreign Service Officer	Ambassador Extraordinary and Plenipotentiary	April 1, 1990	May 25, 1990	Left post on September 3, 1993
Sharon P. Wilkinson		New York	Career Foreign Service Officer	Chargé d'Affaires		September 3, 1993	September 21, 1994
Elizabeth Frawley Bagley		District of Columbia	Non-career appointee	Ambassador Extraordinary and Plenipotentiary	July 5, 1994	September 21, 1994	Left post on October 3, 1997
Gerald S. McGowan		Virginia	Non-career appointee	Ambassador Extraordinary and Plenipotentiary	November 10, 1997	March 10, 1998	Left post on July 3, 2001
John N. Palmer		Mississippi	Non-career appointee	Ambassador Extraordinary and Plenipotentiary	November 5, 2001	November 28, 2001	Left post on September 25, 2004
Alfred Hoffman		Florida	Non-career appointee	Ambassador Extraordinary and Plenipotentiary	October 12, 2005	November 30, 2005	Left post on September 15, 2007
Thomas F. Stephenson		California	Non-career appointee	Ambassador Extraordinary and Plenipotentiary	October 29, 2007	February 8, 2008	Left post on June 21, 2009
Allan J. Katz		Florida	Non-career appointee	Ambassador Extraordinary and Plenipotentiary	March 19, 2010	April 28, 2010	Left post on July 28, 2013
Robert A. Sherman		Massachusetts	Non-career appointee	Ambassador Extraordinary and Plenipotentiary	March 4, 2014	May 3, 2014	Left post on January 20, 2017
Herro Mustafa		North Carolina	Career Foreign Service Officer	Chargé d'Affaires	January 20, 2017		August 25, 2017
George E. Glass		Oregon	Non-career appointee	Ambassador Extraordinary and Plenipotentiary	August 9, 2017	August 30, 2017	January 13, 2021
Kristin M. Kane		California	Career Foreign Service Officer	Chargé d'Affaires	January 13, 2021		June 30, 2022
Randi Charno Levine		New York	Non-career appointee	Ambassador Extraordinary and Plenipotentiary	October 29, 2021	April 22, 2022	January 20, 2025
Douglas Koneff		Washington D.C.	Career Foreign Service Officer	Chargé d'Affaires	January 20, 2025		September 15, 2025
John Arrigo		Florida	Non-career appointee	Ambassador Extraordinary and Plenipotentiary	August 2, 2025	September 30, 2025	

=== Other nominees ===
Name	Portrait	State of residence	Type of appointee	Title	Appointment	Note
John Quincy Adams		Massachusetts		Minister Plenipotentiary	May 30, 1796	Did not serve under this appointment.
John James Appleton		Massachusetts		Chargé d'Affaires		Not commissioned; nomination be Chargé d'Affaires at Rio de Janeiro rejected by the Senate.
John Louis O'Sullivan		New York		Envoy Extraordinary and Minister Plenipotentiary	February 25, 1856	Nomination withdrawn before the Senate acted upon it.
William Cumback		Indiana		Minister Resident	January 28, 1870	Declined appointment.
John Morgan Francis		New York		Chargé d'Affaires	April 28, 1882	Took oath of office, but did not proceed to post in capacity of Chargé d'Affaires.
Henry Sherman Boutell		Illinois		Envoy Extraordinary and Minister Plenipotentiary	March 2, 1911	Took oath of office, but did not proceed to post.
Meredith Nicholson		Indiana		Envoy Extraordinary and Minister Plenipotentiary		Not commissioned; nomination withdrawn before the Senate acted upon it.
Richard Noyes Viets		Florida	Career Foreign Service Officer	Ambassador Extraordinary and Plenipotentiary	September 15, 1987	Nomination was not acted upon by the Senate.
Richard Noyes Viets		Vermont	Career Foreign Service Officer	Ambassador Extraordinary and Plenipotentiary	September 15, 1987	Nomination was not acted upon by the Senate.

== See also ==
- Portuguese Embassy, Washington, D.C.
- Portugal – United States relations
- Foreign relations of Portugal
- Ambassadors of the United States
