= Eric S. Rubin =

American diplomat (1961–2026)

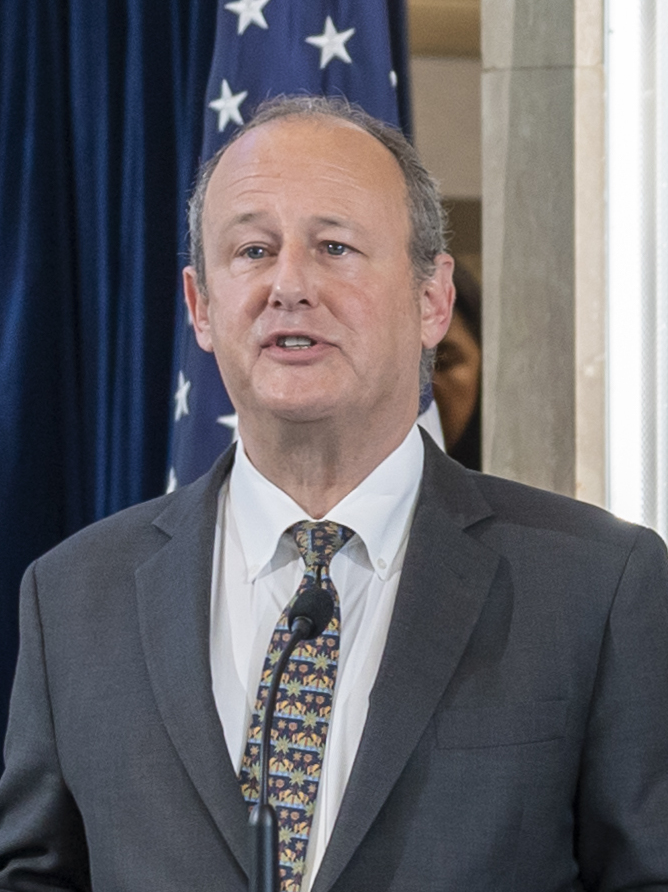

United States Ambassador to Bulgaria
- In office January 27, 2016 – July 9, 2019
- President: Barack Obama; Donald Trump
- Preceded by: Marcie Berman Ries
- Succeeded by: Herro Mustafa

Personal details
- Born: March 30, 1961 New York City, U.S.
- Died: November 17, 2026 (aged 65)
- Spouse: Nicole Simmons
- Children: Liana and Rachel Rubin
- Education: Yale University

Eric Seth Rubin (March 30, 1961 – November 17, 2026) was an American diplomat who served as United States Ambassador to Bulgaria from 2016 to 2019.

Rubin was confirmed as ambassador on January 27, 2016, and succeeded Marcie Berman Ries.

== Diplomatic career ==
Rubin joined the U.S. State Department in 1985, being first assigned as political and human rights officer in Honduras between 1986 and 1988 before returning to Washington D.C. in 1989 to work at the State Department Operations Center. From 1989 to 1991, Rubin worked in the Bureau of Soviet Union Affairs and then from 1991 to 1993 worked as security affairs officer in the Central and Eastern Europe Desk.

He was again posted abroad in 1994 as Deputy Political Counselor in Kyiv. He worked in Ukraine until 1996 when he was recalled to Washington to work for the Assistant Secretary of State for European and Canadian Affairs. Briefly in 1997, Rubin worked as the Assistant White House Press Secretary for Foreign Affairs. In 1998, he was made special assistant to Thomas Pickering, the Under Secretary of State for Political Affairs at the time.

Between 1999 and 2000, Rubin became Rusk Fellow at the Institute for the Study of Diplomacy at Georgetown University and was temporarily relieved of his duties. On teaching and lecturing at the university, Rubin said it helped him "think systematically" about his job.

In 2001, Rubin returned to the state department and was posted to Chiang Mai in Thailand as consul general. He remained there until 2004, when he was recalled to Washington to work as the director of the Office of Policy Planning and Coordination in the Bureau of International Narcotics and Law Enforcement Affairs. In 2006, he was moved to be executive assistant to the Under Secretary of State for Political Affairs, R. Nicholas Burns.

From 2008 to 2011, he was posted to the embassy in Moscow as deputy chief of mission. Between 2011 and his nomination for ambassador in 2015, Rubin worked at the Bureau of European and Eurasian Affairs as deputy assistant secretary.

Rubin was nominated for the post of ambassador by President Obama and was confirmed on 9 December 2015. He was sworn in on 27 January 2016.

He served as the President of the American Foreign Service Association (AFSA) following his posting as Ambassador in Sofia. In December 2019, he and the AFSA raised money for the legal representation of diplomats and other government officials taking part in the 2019 impeachment inquiry against Donald Trump.

== Personal life and death ==
Rubin was married with two daughters, and was a member of a Reform Jewish congregation in New York City. He spoke Thai, French, Spanish, Ukrainian, Bulgarian and Russian.

Rubin died on November 17, 2026, at the age of 65.

Diplomatic posts
Preceded by Marcie Berman Ries	United States Ambassador to Bulgaria; 2016–2019	Succeeded by Herro Mustafa
