= Allan J. Katz =

American politician

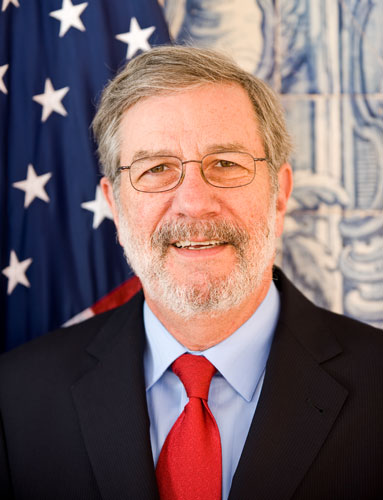

United States Ambassador to Portugal
- In office March 26, 2010 – July 23, 2013
- President: Barack Obama
- Preceded by: Thomas F. Stephenson
- Succeeded by: Robert A. Sherman

Personal details
- Born: Allan Jack Katz; April 30, 1947 (age 79) St. Louis, Missouri
- Party: Democratic
- Profession: politician professor

Allan Jack Katz (born April 30, 1947) is a former City Commissioner of Tallahassee and American Ambassador to Portugal. President Barack Obama nominated Allan to be Ambassador of the United States of America to the Portuguese Republic in November 2009. Ambassador Allan Katz is a distinguished professor with the University of Missouri Kansas City Bloch School's Department of Public Affairs and the College of Arts and Science's Political Science Department. He is the founder of the American Public Square, an organization using civil discourse to bridge the partisan divide. In 2019, American Public Square announced a new partnership with William Jewell College, changing its name to American Public Square at Jewell, and Ambassador Katz was brought on as Distinguished Professor in Residence in William Jewell's Department of Political Science. Katz is a lawyer by profession who has been active in local and national government and politics for many years. He has been a member of the Democratic National Committee where he helped draft the party's platform for the 2008 Democratic National Convention. Ambassador Katz holds a B.A. from the University of Missouri-Kansas City and a J.D. from the American University Washington College of Law in Washington D.C. He was raised in a Jewish family in St. Louis, the son of Fred and Eileen Katz. His father escaped Nazi Germany for the United States where he worked as a salesman; and was one of the original founders of the St. Louis Holocaust Museum. Katz graduated from University City High School.

Diplomatic posts
Preceded by Thomas F. Stephenson	United States Ambassador to Portugal; 2010–2013	Succeeded by Robert A. Sherman
