= Raymond Henry Norweb =

American diplomat

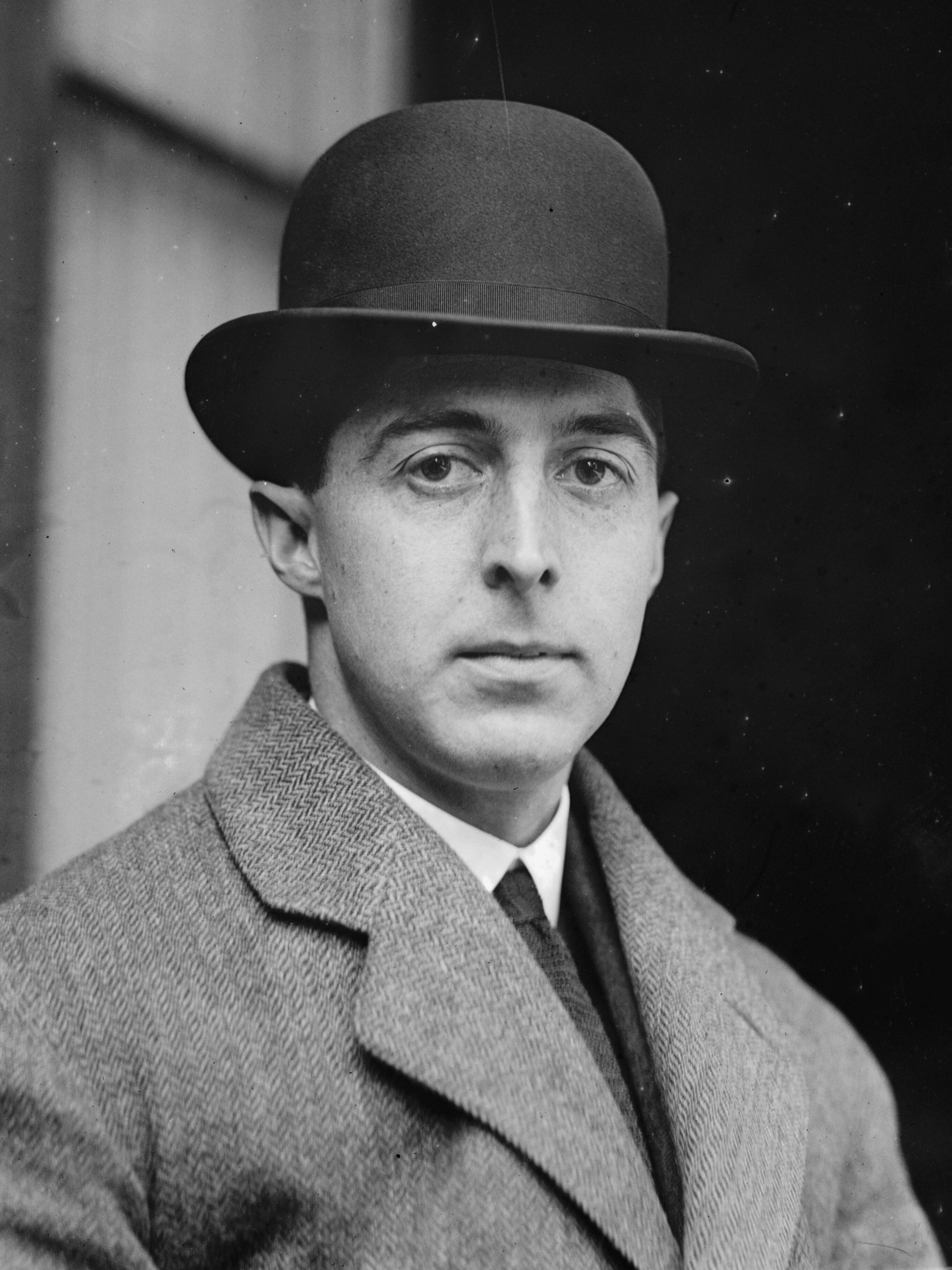

United States Ambassador to Peru
- In office January 12, 1940 – September 30, 1943
- Preceded by: Laurence A. Steinhardt
- Succeeded by: John Campbell White

United States Ambassador to Portugal
- In office December 3, 1943 – February 15, 1945
- Preceded by: Bert Fish
- Succeeded by: Herman B. Baruch

United States Ambassador to Cuba
- In office July 24, 1945 – May 22, 1948
- Preceded by: Spruille Braden
- Succeeded by: Willard L. Beaulac

Personal details
- Born: Raymond Henry Norweb; May 31, 1893 Nottingham, England
- Died: October 4, 1983 (aged 90)
- Spouse: Emery May Holden
- Profession: Diplomat

Raymond Henry Norweb (May 31, 1895 – October 4, 1983) was a United States diplomat with posts in various countries, including France, Bolivia, The Dominican Republic, Peru, Portugal and Cuba. In 1943 he was sent to Portugal, with the personal rank of Ambassador, to close the negotiations for the agreement between the United States and Portugal that allowed the United States to obtain a military base in the Azores, the Lajes Field, in time for the Azores to play a substantial role in the Far Eastern campaign.

== Biography ==
Raymond Henry Norweb was born in England and moved to Elyria, Ohio with his family in 1907. He graduated from Harvard in 1916. He was a career diplomat, starting in 1917, in Paris, as second secretary to Ambassador William Graves Sharp. He was assigned to diplomatic posts in various countries, including France, Japan, the Netherlands, the Dutch East Indies, Chile, the Dominican Republic, Peru, Portugal and Bolivia. His last assignment was as ambassador to Cuba, 1945–1948.

During World War II, in 1943 he was sent to Portugal, with the personal rank of Ambassador, to head the negotiations for establishing the United States air base in the Azores. Norweb had already negotiated rights to military bases in Peru and the Germans press tagged him a "famous American base stealer". The negotiations for the agreement between the United States and Portugal, conducted initially by George Kennan Chargé d’Affairs in Portugal, were long and complex. The final agreement was signed on November 28, 1944, between Norweb and Portuguese ruler Salazar. When Norweb arrived to Lisbon the US diplomatic representation was just a legation, under Norweb it became so important a place that it was made an Embassy.

He retired to Cleveland in 1948 from his post as Ambassador to Cuba.

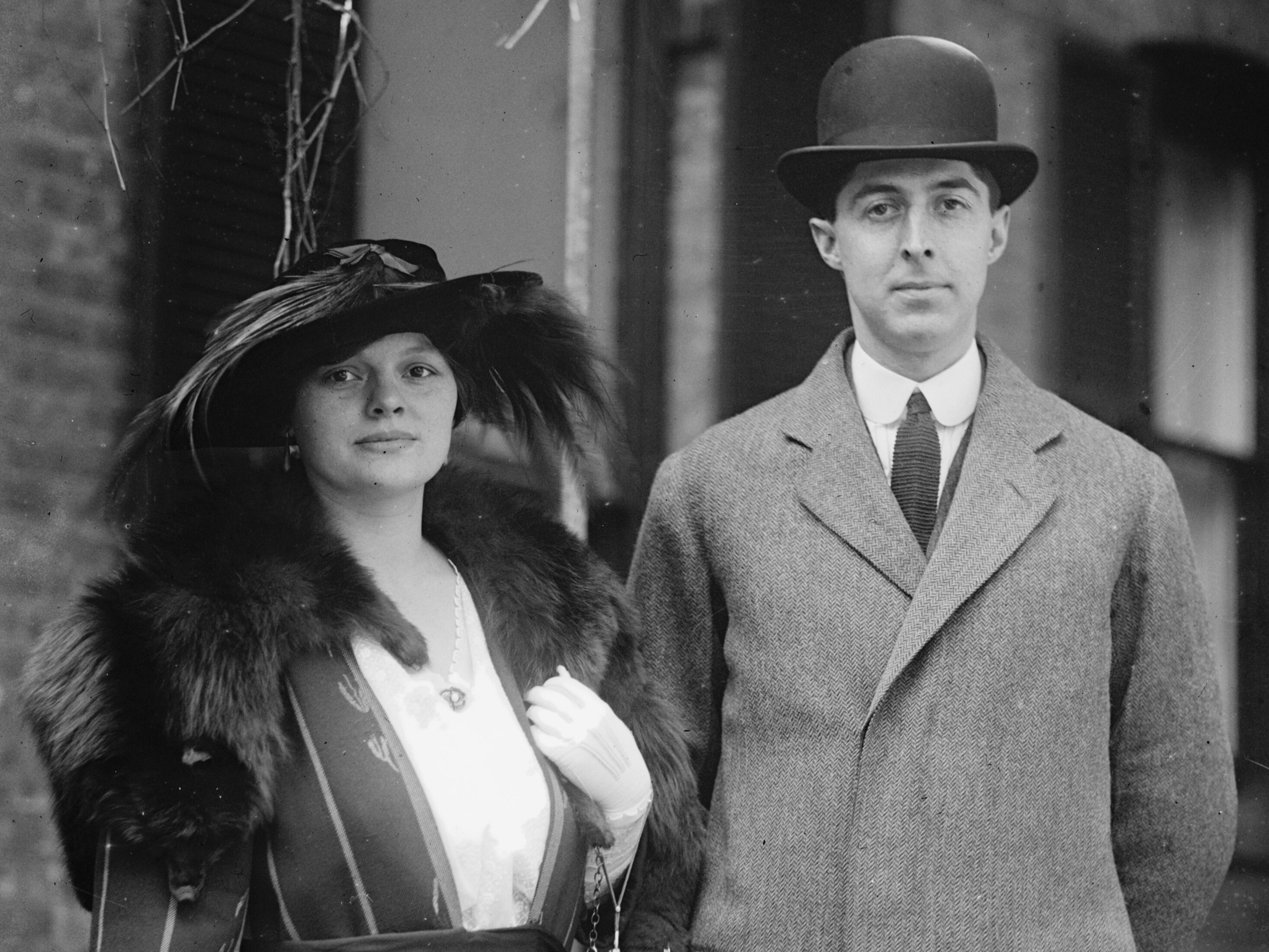
Norweb and his wife, Emery

Norweb and his wife Emery were both noted experts on world and U.S. coins. R. Henry Norweb Sr. was a member of the American Numismatic Society, the Royal Numismatic Society, the Canadian Numismatic Association, and the New York Numismatic Club. He was a member of the American Numismatic Society, serving on that body's Council from 1960 until 1978. In the latter year Henry was appointed an honorary Life Councillor to the ANS.

The Norwebs owned a specimen of the 1913 Liberty Head nickel, which they donated to the Smithsonian Institution's National Numismatic Collection in 1978 to commemorate their sixtieth wedding anniversary. The Norweb specimen is one of two 1913 Liberty Head nickels that have ended up in museums.

He was a life member of the James Smithson Society, receiving the Society's gold medal, together with his wife, in 1978. Mr. Norweb served as president of the John Huntingdon Fund for Education, and was a trustee of Kenyon College and the Western Reserve Historical Society.

Their son, R. Henry Norweb Jr. (1918-1995), carried on the family tradition and served as American Numismatic Society president from 1990 to 1994.

== See also ==
- Aviation in the Azores
- Lajes Field
- Portugal during World War II
- 1913 Liberty Head nickel

== Sources ==
- "Raymond Henry Norweb (1894–1983)". Office of the Historian. Bureau of Public Affairs, United States Department of State.
- Montgomery, Paul; Borckardt, Mark; Knight, Ray (2005). Million dollar nickels : mysteries of the illicit 1913 liberty nickels revealed. Irvine: Zyrus Press Inc. p. 347. ISBN 9780974237183.
- "Norweb, Raymond Henry". The Encyclopedia of Cleveland History.

Diplomatic posts
Preceded by Laurence A. Steinhardt	United States Ambassador to Peru; 1940–1943	Succeeded by John Campbell White
Preceded by post created	United States Ambassador to Portugal; 1944–1945	Succeeded by Herman B. Baruch
Preceded by Spruille Braden	United States Ambassador to Cuba; 1945–1948	Succeeded by Robert Butler
