= American Herro =

- Directed by: Kirk Roos
- Produced by: Kirk Roos
- Edited by: Jason Kish
- Distributed by: Passion River Films
- Release date: February 17, 2009 (United States)
- Running time: 57 minutes
- Country: United States
- Language: Kurdish
- Budget: $100,000

American Herro is a biographical documentary film about Herro Mustafa, an American diplomat and senior adviser on the Middle East to Joe Biden when he was Vice President.

The documentary covers Herro's early childhood as a Kurdish-Muslim refugee from Iraq as she fled with her family from Iraqi Kurdistan while under Saddam Hussein's regime to Minot, North Dakota, as well as her academic success and successful career as a diplomat stationed in Bosnia, Turkey, Iraq, and elsewhere. The documentary features home video footage of Mustafa's family in Iraq, photography from her childhood, and modern interviews with family, coworkers, and her trip back to Iraq.
