= Al Hoffman Jr. =

American businessman and diplomat

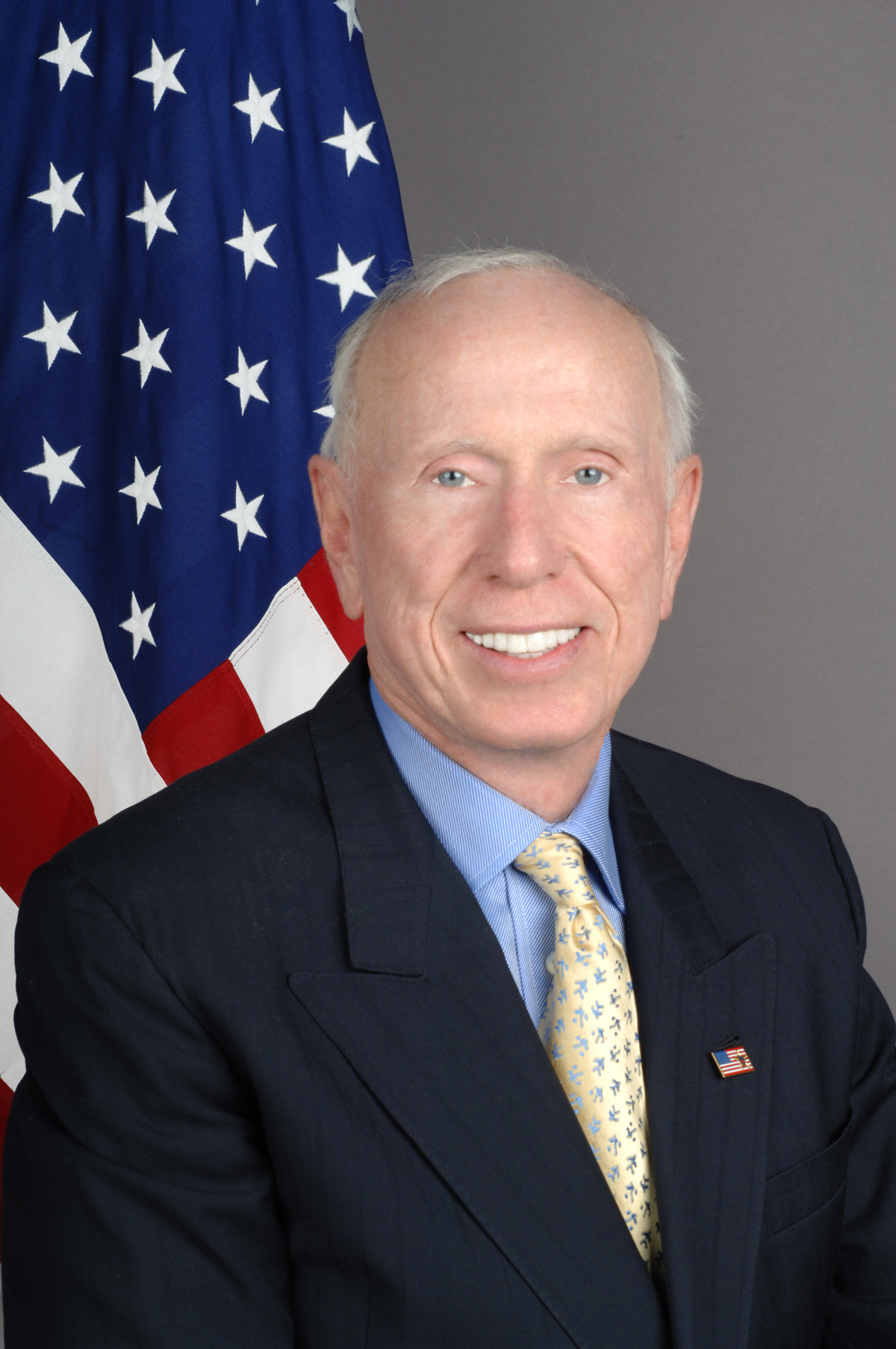

United States Ambassador to Portugal
- In office October 12, 2005 – September 15, 2007
- President: George W. Bush
- Preceded by: John N. Palmer
- Succeeded by: Thomas F. Stephenson

Personal details
- Born: March 27, 1934 (age 92) Cook County, Illinois
- Children: Elisabeth Hoffman, Matthew Hoffman, Sophie Hoffman, Ava Hoffman
- Education: United States Military Academy - West Point; Harvard Business School

Alfred Hoffman Jr. (born March 27, 1934) is an American businessman and politician. He is a real estate developer and a former Ambassador to Portugal.

== Early life ==
Hoffman was raised on the south side of Chicago, the youngest of seven children. His father, a Jewish Austrian, emigrated to the United States in 1906 and opened a poultry store, while his mother was a Scottish-American immigrant who grew up in Kentucky. Hoffman graduated from Morgan Park Military Academy in 1952, and was accepted to the United States Military Academy that same year. He became a captain in the Air Force, where Hoffman flew F-100s. Instead of continuing his career in the air force, Hoffman attended Harvard Business School, where he became interested in real estate development.

== Career ==
After leaving Harvard, Hoffman got a job for KB Homes, a developer in Detroit, Michigan. Hoffman rose to the rank of executive vice president. In 1967, Hoffman founded his own firm, Tekton Corp, which he sold to another company in 1970. In 1975, Hoffman founded another development company, Florida Design Communities, which bought land from struggling companies. In 1995, Hoffman and Don Ackerman bought Westinghouse Communities, which they renamed to WCI Communities. In 2002, The Washington Post described Hoffman as the most influential developer in the state of Florida. Hoffman's development activities were criticized by many environmentalists. Hoffman sold his stake in WCI in 2005 to become the Ambassador to Portugal, a post he held until 2007. In 2008, Hoffman founded Hoffman Partners, another real estate development company.

== Other activities ==
Hoffman served as co-chair of George W. Bush's 2000 campaign for president, and also served as finance chair of the Republican National Committee and the chairman of Florida Governor Jeb Bush's re-election campaign. Hoffman fundraised for John McCain's 2008 candidacy and Mitt Romney's 2012 candidacy. Hoffman donated $1 million to Right to Rise, a Super PAC supporting Jeb Bush's 2016 presidential candidacy. Hoffman served as chairman of Marco Rubio's successful 2010 Senate candidacy, but tried to dissuade Rubio from running for president in 2016.

In 2010, Hoffman put his $10 million home in Fort Myers, Florida up for auction, and moved to Palm Beach, Florida.

Following a February 2018 school shooting in Florida, Hoffman publicized an email sent to Florida governor Rick Scott and former governor Jeb Bush, among others, pledging to no longer fund legislative groups or candidates who were not actively working to ban sales of military-style assault weapons to civilians. "For how many years now have we been doing this — having these experiences of terrorism, mass killings — and how many years has it been that nothing's been done?" Hoffman said. "It's the end of the road for me."

Diplomatic posts
Preceded by John N. Palmer	United States Ambassador to Portugal; 2005–2007	Succeeded by Thomas F. Stephenson
