= Randi Levine =

American author and diplomat

Randi Levine GCIH
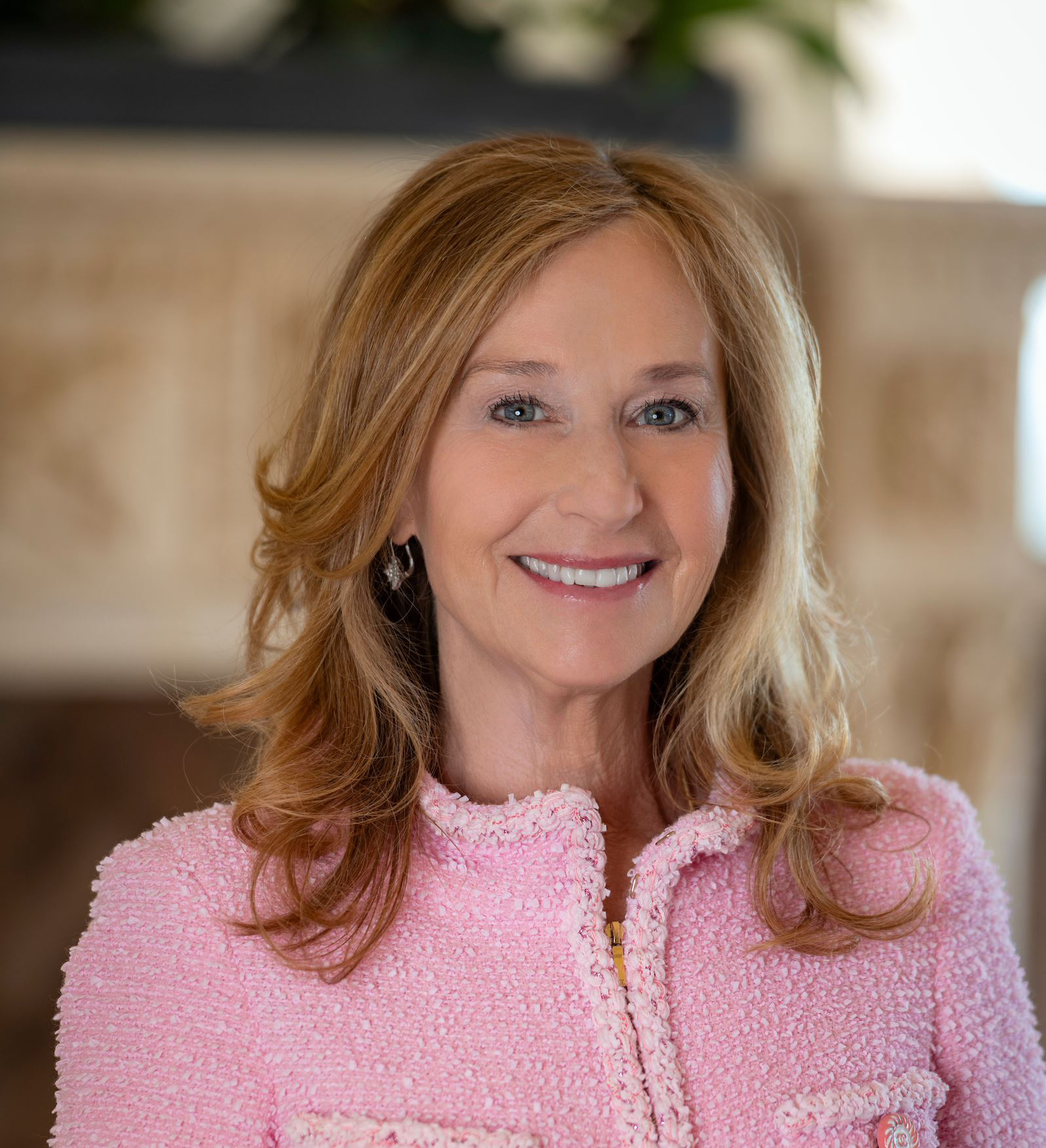
- Official portrait, 2022

United States Ambassador to Portugal
- In office April 22, 2022 – January 20, 2025
- President: Joe Biden
- Preceded by: George Edward Glass
- Succeeded by: John Arrigo

Personal details
- Born: Randi Charno
- Spouse: Jeffrey E. Levine
- Children: 3
- Education: University of Missouri (BA)

Randi Charno Levine GCIH is an American author, arts advocate, and diplomat who served as the United States ambassador to Portugal from 2022 to 2025.

== Education ==
Levine earned a Bachelor of Arts degree from the Missouri School of Journalism.

== Career ==
Levine has been a member of advisory and governing boards for several organizations, including the Barbara and Edward Netter Center for Community Partnerships, Hamptons International Film Festival, John and Doris Norton School of Family and Consumer Sciences, Roundabout Theatre Company, NYU Langone Health, High Line, Anna Wintour Costume Center, National Portrait Gallery, New Museum, and Meridian International Center.

=== Ambassador to Portugal ===
On October 29, 2021, President Joe Biden nominated Levine to be the ambassador to Portugal. Hearings on her nomination were held before the Senate Foreign Relations Committee on February 8, 2022. The committee favorably reported her nomination to the Senate floor on March 8, 2022. The entire Senate confirmed Levine by voice vote on March 10, 2022. She presented her credentials to President Marcelo Rebelo de Sousa on April 22, 2022.

During her tenure, Levine focused on strengthening U.S.-Portugal relations across defense, innovation, renewable energy, and cultural diplomacy. In an interview with Expresso's The Heart & Hustle podcast, she emphasized Portugal's ability to make an outsized impact on the international stage despite its relatively small size.

Levine played a key role in advancing bilateral defense cooperation, culminating in Portugal's participation in a U.S. defense program shortly before her departure. This agreement, announced in January 2025, marked a significant step in aligning Portugal's military capabilities with NATO standards, enhancing interoperability between Portuguese and U.S. forces.

In 2023, Ambassador Levine hosted the “Art in Embassies” celebration, which featured an exhibit at Casa Carlucci titled “Celebrating Diversity – Democracy and Representation in the Arts.” The event, opened by First Lady Jill Biden, included three days of public panels and discussions across Lisbon with prominent Portuguese and American artists. Levine also spearheaded numerous intercultural initiatives that highlighted the shared artistic heritage of Portugal and the United States. These included Diplomacia Hip Hop with Portuguese rapper Sam the Kid, Diplomacia Culinária featuring American chef Art Smith, and L'USAfonia, a free public concert where Portuguese-African musicians performed traditional American music to commemorate Black History Month.

Ambassador Levine resigned on January 19, 2025, the day before Donald Trump was inaugurated for his second presidential term. Shortly before she left the post, she was awarded the Grand Cross of the Order of Prince Henry the Navigator by President Marcelo Rebelo de Sousa.

She also is a distinguished fellow in the Atlantic Council's Transatlantic Security Initiative of the Scowcroft Center for Strategy and Security, a visiting fellow at Arizona State University’s Institute of Politics, and a writer who has published articles about arts and cultural diplomacy, the transatlantic alliance, public service, and energy and AI.

== Personal life ==
Levine's husband, Jeffrey E. Levine, is the founder of Douglaston Development and Levine Builders. He has also worked as the president of the Jewish National Fund–USA. Levine has three children.

In January 2025, the Catholic University of Portugal awarded Levine the title of Honorary Professor of Art and Diplomacy.

== Honors ==
- Grand Cross of the Order of Prince Henry the Navigator, Portugal (January 3, 2025).

Diplomatic posts
Preceded by George Edward Glass	United States Ambassador to Portugal; 2022–2025	Succeeded by John Arrigo
