= Mike Fernandez =

American businessman

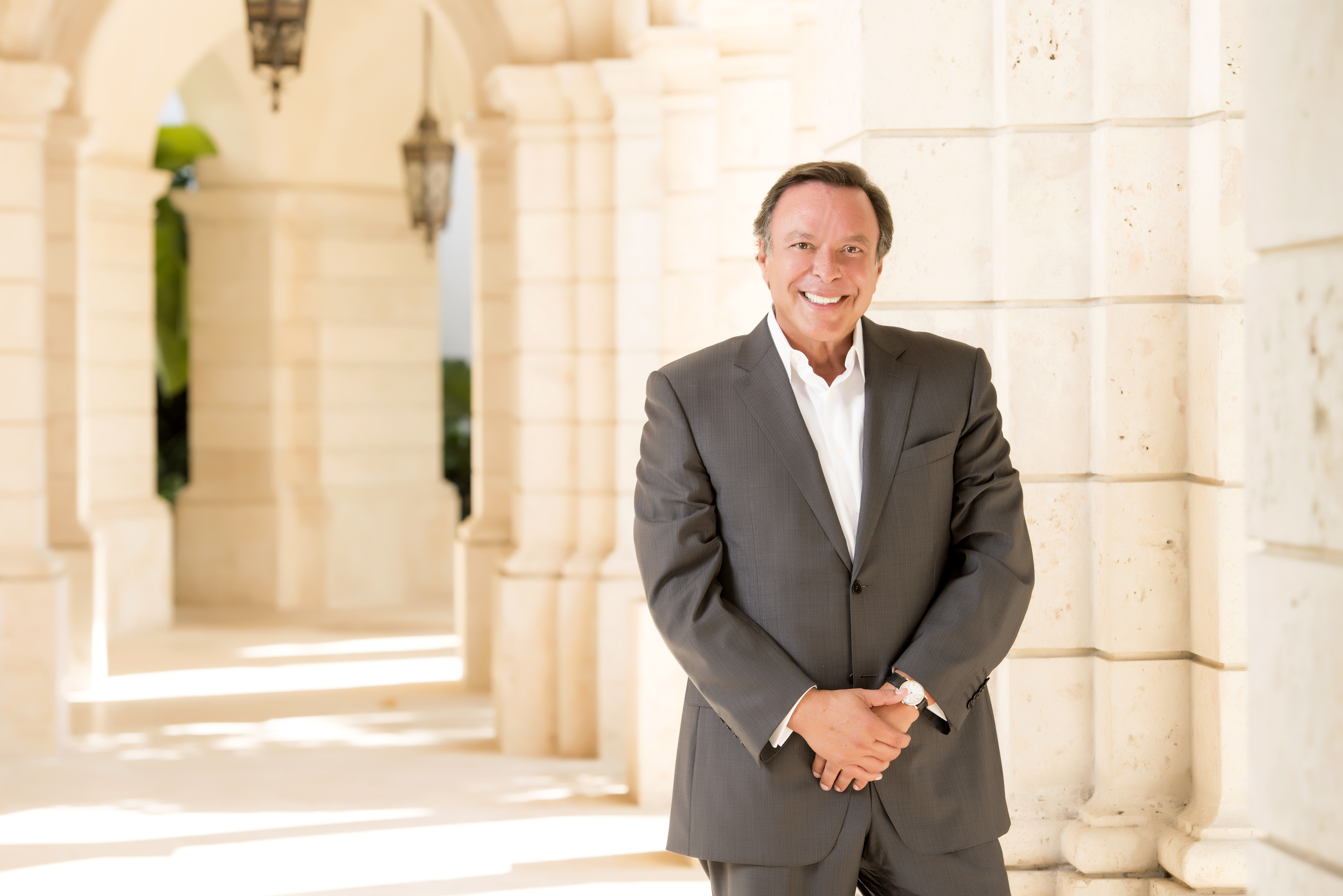

Miguel "Mike" B. Fernandez is a Cuban-American health care industry businessman, investor, and philanthropist. He is the founder of MBF Healthcare Partners, a private equity firm founded in 2005 in Coral Gables, Florida.

== Early life and education ==
Fernandez was born in Manzanillo, Cuba, the elder of two children of Lieba Fernandez and Mario Antonio Fernandez. Fernandez has a younger sister, Pilar Giorgini (Pilar de los Angeles Fernandez). On Christmas Day, 1964, Fernandez and his family were escorted by the Cuban military out of their own house and told to leave Cuba. The Fernandez family landed in Mexico City, and lived in a convent temporarily and then with other Mexican families. After six months of living in Mexico, the Fernandez family received their U.S. visas and made their way to New York City. Fernandez received a scholarship to attend Xavier High School, an all-boys Jesuit high school in the heart of Manhattan. On weeknights, Fernandez worked at the New York State Psychiatric Institute, part of Presbyterian Hospital, cleaning cages of animals that were used in experiments. On weekends, Fernandez worked at the American Museum of Natural History at the kiosk stand selling souvenirs. Fernandez attended the University of New Mexico in Albuquerque before serving in the US Army during the Vietnam conflict.

== Career ==
In 1975, after serving in the United States Army, Fernandez began his career in the insurance field. Recognizing an opportunity in packaging health insurance with life insurance policies, Fernandez began selling health insurance to existing clients. In 1981 Fernandez started Group Tech System, the first national database on health insurance quoting programs. Group tech became Comprehensive Benefit Administrators Inc. (CBAI) which was sold to Ramsay HMO. Ramsay HMO was the second-largest publicly held HMO in Florida during the early 1990s. Ramsay HMO was sold to United Healthcare in 1993, and at the time Fernandez was the second largest shareholder. In 1993, Fernandez launched Physician's Healthcare Plans (PHP) based in Tampa FL. The company was sold to AmeriGroup in 2002. Two months later, Fernandez started CarePlus Health. In 2005, he sold CarePlus Health Plans, a company he founded, to Humana, and founded MBF Healthcare Partners, a private equity firm in Coral Gables. In 2015 he sold Simply Healthcare Plans to Anthem.

He has been the Founder and/or majority shareholder of 25 healthcare related companies. Most of these companies have been acquired by publicly traded companies. Among these enterprises are Physicians Healthcare Plans, CAC Medical Centers, Prescribit Rx, CarePlus Health Plans, Navarro Pharmacies, Medical Specialties Distributors, Hospitalists of America, ADI Dental, NutriForce, Simply Healthcare Plans, Acorn Health, Affinity Hospice, Strive Dental and Carisk Partners. After every sale, Fernandez distributes a significant portion to the company's employees. He has done this over two dozen times. In addition, he has been an active investor in other healthcare companies with majority and sometimes a minority ownership.

== Charity ==
At a very young age, Fernandez learned the value of "to take care of those who come after you". He completed a 508-mile walk from France and Spain multiple times, in order to raise funds for a variety of children's causes. Over the past 20 years, he has contributed in excess of $100 million to charitable causes.

Mike Fernandez was also the Founder and Chairman of the Immigration Partnership and Coalition Fund (IMPAC). The IMPAC Fund fundraises to expand currently existing legal services and programs to help undocumented immigrants fight unjust deportation procedures and grant them a path to citizenship. He is a Co-Founder of American Business Immigration Coalition based in Chicago.

== Politics ==
=== Political contributions ===
Fernandez has been primarily a Republican donor. In 2016, the New York Times wrote that Fernandez was "one of the most prolific donors in a key swing state" (Florida). The Miami Herald has described Fernandez as "one of Florida's biggest Republican moneymen. He currently is registered as an Independent since 2016."

Fernandez was also a major supporter of Mitt Romney's 2012 presidential campaign.

In 2013, Fernandez co-chaired Governor Rick Scott's re-election efforts.

During the 2016 election cycle, Fernandez was a major supporter of Jeb Bush, who unsuccessfully sought the Republican presidential nomination. Fernandez donated to Bush and his "Right to Rise" super PAC, making him Bush's largest donor and (as of February 2016) the 16th largest donor of the 2016 presidential election.

As a former Republican, Fernandez was not a supporter of Donald Trump in the 2016, 2020 and 2024 Presidential Elections.

In August 2025, Fernandez publicly acknowledged funding a campaign aimed at opposing Cuban-American politicians who support former President Donald Trump's immigration policies. The campaign included billboards and media ads targeting figures such as Marco Rubio, Carlos Giménez, and María Elvira Salazar.

=== Political views and Cuba-U.S. relations ===
Fernandez has praised the Massachusetts health care reform enacted under Mitt Romney, but opposes the Patient Protection and Affordable Care Act.

Fernandez (who was born in Cuba), supported Obama's decision to normalize relations with Cuba and lift the U.S. embargo against Cuba, a decision that Fernandez called "65 years overdue." Like other prominent Cuban Americans, Fernandez shifted positions on U.S.-Cuban relations over time, receding from hard-line stance and moving toward a position in favor of rapprochement. Fernandez wrote an op-ed published in the Miami Herald about his shift. Fernandez was part of the historic visit by President Obama to Cuba in 2016; he was part of a group of U.S. business executives, including many Cuban Americans, who met with Cuban businesspeople and government.

Fernandez is active with the Cuba Study Group.

== Personal life ==
Mike Fernandez is married to Constance Tolevich Fernandez and has 5 children, George, Alex, Michelle, Michael, and Cristofer. He also has five grandchildren. In 2014, Fernandez released his autobiography, titled "Humbled by the Journey. Life Lessons for my Family… and Yours". The autobiography takes readers on parallel journeys: his 508-mile pilgrimage along El Camino de Santiago- and from a dirt-road Cuban town to the pinnacles of U.S. business success. Fernandez also owns a 4,000-acre ranch in Gadsden County part of which is in Havana, Florida where he breeds Friesian horses and cattle stock.
