= Pacific Crest Securities =

- Company type: Private company
- Industry: Financial services
- Founded: 1990
- Founder: George Edward Glass
- Defunct: 2015
- Fate: Acquired
- Successor: KeyBank's investment banking unit, KeyBanc Capital Markets (KBCM)
- Headquarters: Portland, Oregon, United States
- Area served: Worldwide technology sector
- Key people: Scott Sandbo (CEO), Daniel Shank (CFO/COO)
- Products: Investment banking, Equity Investments (research, sales, and trading)
- Number of employees: 170 (2015)

Pacific Crest Securities was an American independent investment bank initially based in the Pacific Northwest region. The bank focused on the global technology sector in institutional equities (research, sales, trading) and investment banking (mergers and acquisitions and public offerings).

== History ==
The firm was founded in 1990 initially focused on the Pacific Northwest region then in 1998 the firm shifted to focus solely on the global technology sector in institutional equities (research, sales, trading) and investment banking (mergers and acquisitions and public offerings). Scott Sandbo was chairman and CEO, George Glass was president. Pacific Crest was recognized by Institutional Investor and Greenwich Associates for its technology research.

Pacific Crest was an active managing underwriter for technology initial public offerings including Alibaba, Facebook and Workday.

In 2010 Pacific Crest established an annual survey to provide benchmark information to private SaaS companies' operational and financial metrics. The SaaS survey has become a standard for reporting growth rates, margins and customer acquisition data for private SaaS companies

In 2011 Pacific Crest acquired Shanghai-based investment research firm, Pacific Epoch, from Goldman Sachs to provide data and perspectives on the dynamics impacting the technology landscape in China.

In July 2014, KeyCorp's investment banking unit, KeyBanc Capital Markets (KBCM), announced its intention to acquire Pacific Crest and Pacific Crest was merged into KBCM in 2015.

At the time of the acquisition, Pacific Crest Securities had 170 employees in their offices worldwide.
