= John Arrigo =

American diplomat (born 1964)

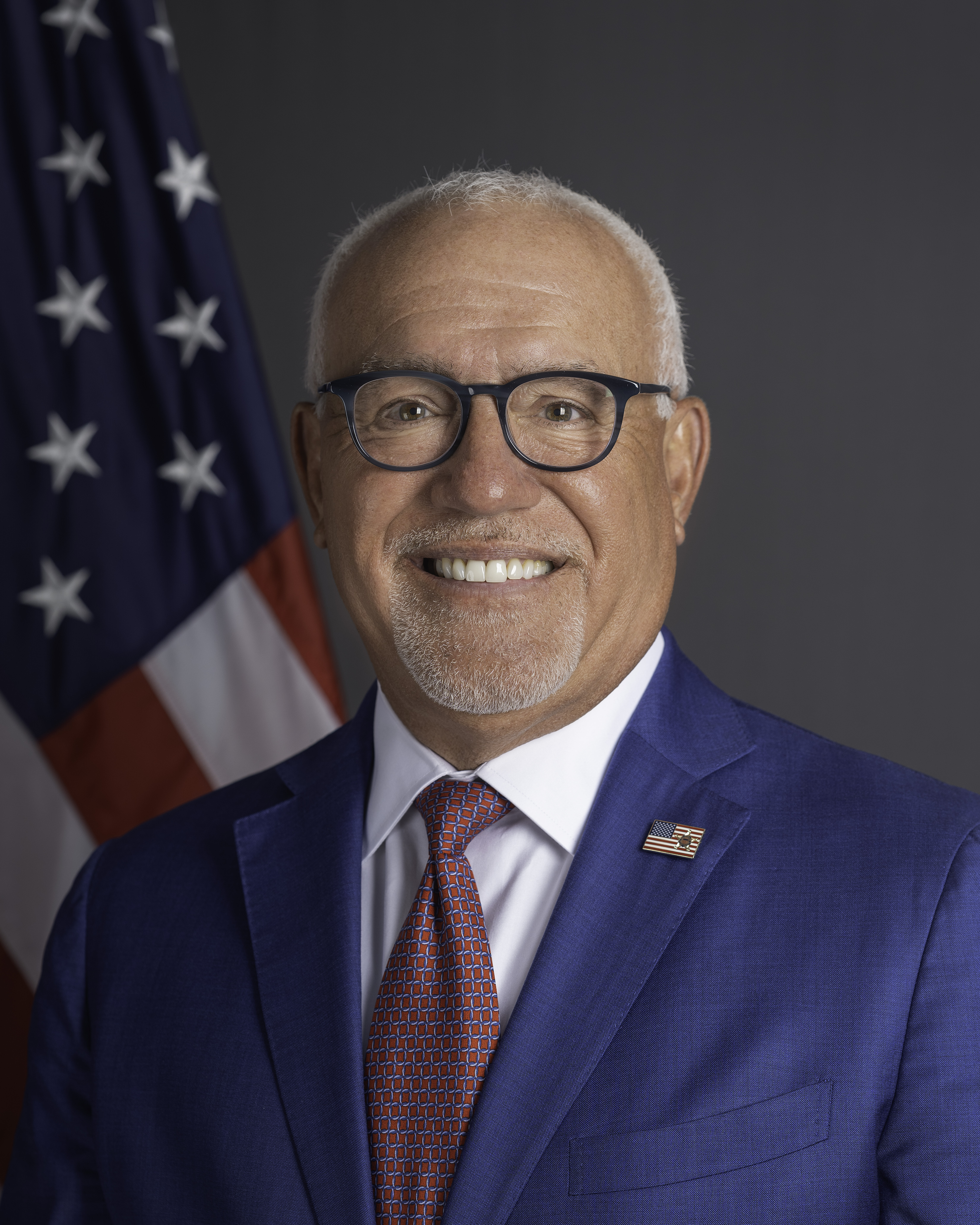
- Official portrait, 2025

United States Ambassador to Portugal
- Incumbent
- Assumed office September 30, 2025
- President: Donald Trump
- Preceded by: Randi Levine

Personal details
- Born: May 12, 1964 (age 62)
- Party: Republican
- Spouse: Megan Arrigo
- Children: 3
- Education: Palm Beach State College (AA)
- Occupation: Diplomat; businessman

John Joseph Arrigo (born May 12, 1964) is an American businessman and diplomat who has served as the United States Ambassador to Portugal since 2025.

== Early life and education ==
He earned an Associate's Degree in Business Administration from the Palm Beach State College.

== Career ==
He spent about 36 years as Vice-President of the Arrigo Auto Group in West Palm Beach, Florida. Here, he became noted for the ads his company aired.

== Family ==
He married Megan Noderer on March 27, 2021, at Mar-a-Lago. Former President Donald Trump, who he's called a close friend for more than two decades, gave a two-minute wedding toast.

== Ambassadorship ==
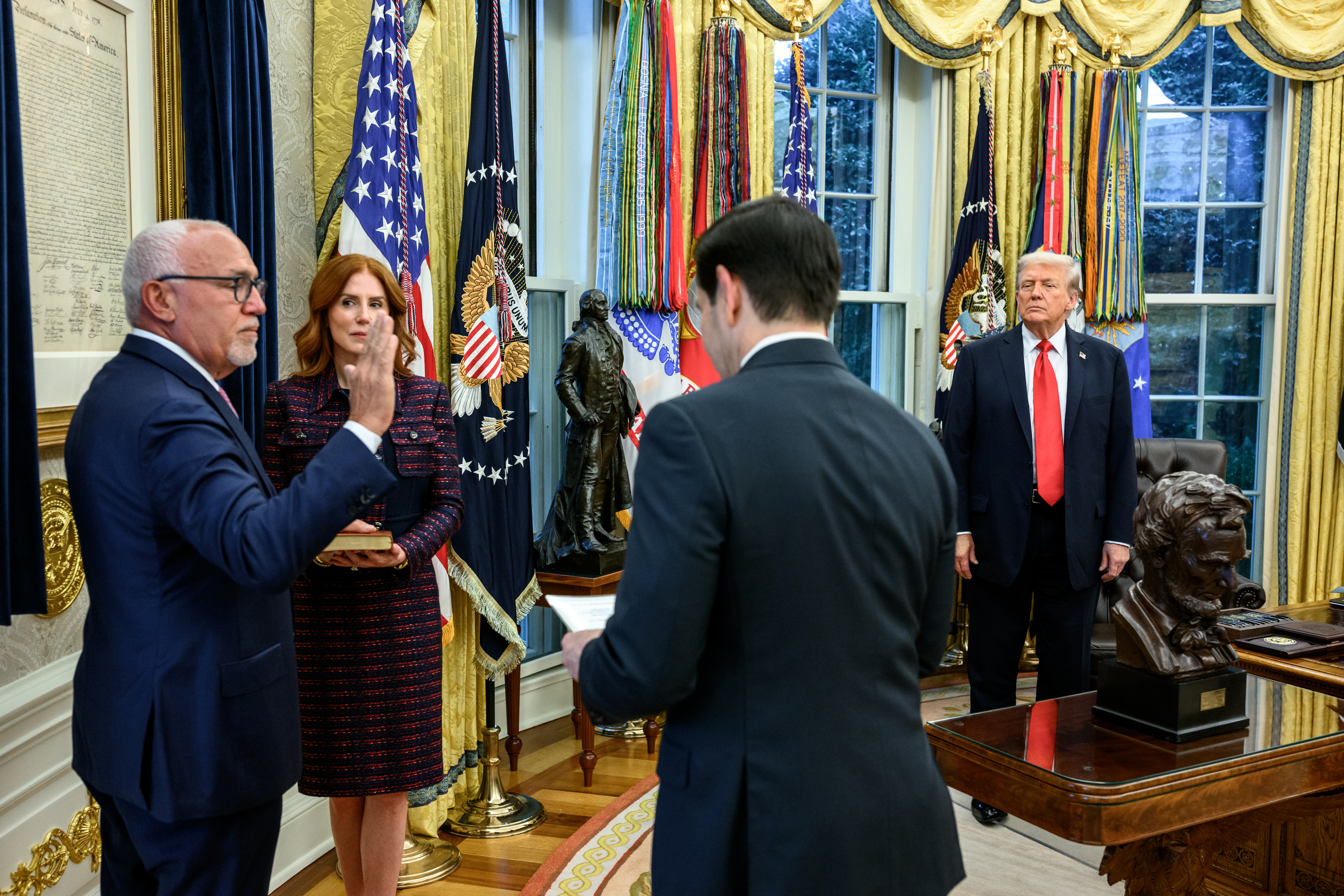
Marco Rubio swearing-in John Arrigo for ambassador to Portugal

On Christmas Eve 2024, Donald Trump announced on Truth Social that Arrigo would be his nominee to be United States Ambassador to Portugal. He was sworn in on September 10, 2025, after a Senate confirmation on August 2, 2025, by a vote of 52-42. He presented his credentials to Portuguese president Marcelo Rebelo de Sousa on September 30, 2025. He has urged Portugal to increase its defense spending.
