= Herman B. Baruch =

American banker

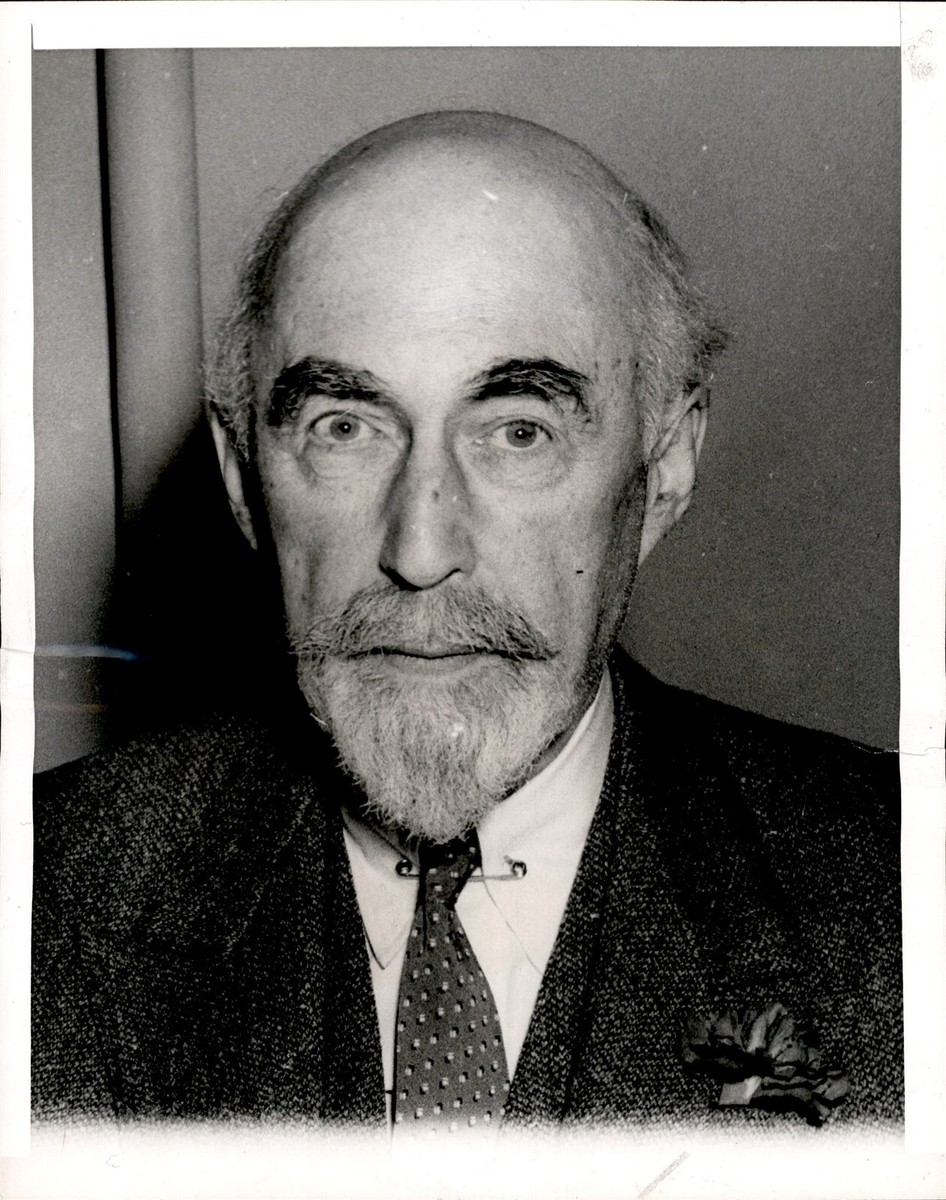
- Baruch in 1945

United States Ambassador to the Netherlands
- In office April 12, 1947 – August 26, 1949
- President: Harry S. Truman
- Preceded by: Stanley Hornbeck
- Succeeded by: Selden Chapin

United States Ambassador to Portugal
- In office April 12, 1945 – March 9, 1947
- President: Harry S. Truman
- Preceded by: Raymond Henry Norweb
- Succeeded by: John Cooper Wiley

Personal details
- Born: Herman Benjamin Baruch; April 28, 1872 Camden, South Carolina, U.S.
- Died: March 15, 1953 (aged 80) Wyandanch, New York, U.S.
- Party: Democratic
- Parent(s): Simon Baruch; Isabel Wolfe
- Education: City College of New York (BA); Columbia University

Herman Benjamin Baruch (April 28, 1872 – March 15, 1953) was an American physician and diplomat who served as United States Ambassador to the Netherlands and Portugal.

== Life and career ==
Newsreels in which Dutch subjects of a certain week are presented. During World War II several persons in Breda offered their help to stranded Allied pilots. One of these pilots has now sent a supply of cigarettes as a thank-you. The American ambassador, Dr. Herman B. Baruch, hands them out. SHOTS: - ext. and int. of the hiding-places of pilots and other rooms that were used by the Dutch resistance; - Dutch military policeman shows the border post where he handed over pilots to the Belgian underground during the war; - the cigarettes are handed out by Baruch in the town hall in the presence of mayor C. A. Prinsen; - one of the pilot helpers, Mrs. Überfeld, receives flowers from Baruch.

Herman Benjamin Baruch was born in Camden, South Carolina on April 28, 1872. The son of Simon Baruch and brother of Bernard Baruch, he graduated from the College of the City of New York in 1892, attended the University of Virginia, and received his medical degree from the Columbia University College of Physicians and Surgeons in 1895.

Baruch practiced medicine in New York City, and later became a partner with his brothers Bernard, Hartwig and Sailing in Baruch Brothers, an investment bank and stock brokerage. The Baruchs were supporters of the Democratic party, with Bernard advising both Woodrow Wilson and Franklin D. Roosevelt during their presidencies, and all the brothers and their company providing financial support to the party and its candidates.

Baruch was a Delegate to the 1932 Democratic National Convention, and was also a presidential elector, casting his ballot for Franklin D. Roosevelt. In 1943 Baruch was appointed representative of the U.S. Board of Economic Warfare in Brazil and special advisor to the U.S. Ambassador in that country.

In 1945 Baruch was appointed United States Ambassador to Portugal. He served until 1947, when he was named United States Ambassador to the Netherlands. Baruch served at The Hague until 1949, when he resigned as part of his brother Bernard's dispute with President Harry S. Truman. On his list of appointments for September 5, 1945 Truman described his 11:15 AM meeting with Herman Baruch: "Flatterer. Wants to be ambassador to France. Conniver like his Brother."

After returning to the United States, Baruch became President of the Simon Baruch Foundation. He was a Delegate to the 1952 Democratic National Convention.

Baruch died in Wyandanch, New York on March 15, 1953.

Diplomatic posts
Preceded by R. Henry Norweb	United States Ambassador to Portugal; 1945–1947	Succeeded by John C. Wiley
Preceded by Stanley K. Hornbeck	United States Ambassador to the Netherlands; 1947–1949	Succeeded by Selden Chapin
