= Robert A. Sherman =

American lawyer

Robert Sherman GCIH
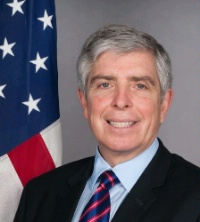

United States Ambassador to Portugal
- In office April 5, 2014 – January 20, 2017
- President: Barack Obama
- Preceded by: Allan J. Katz
- Succeeded by: George Edward Glass

Personal details
- Born: November 10, 1953 (age 72) Boston, Massachusetts, United States
- Party: Democratic
- Education: University of Rochester; Boston University School of Law

Robert A. Sherman (born 1953) is an attorney who served as United States Ambassador to Portugal from 2014 to 2017.

== Early life and education ==
Sherman hails from Boston, Massachusetts. Sherman earned a Bachelor of Arts in political science at the University of Rochester in 1975 and a J.D. at Boston University School of Law in 1978.

== Career ==
=== Law career ===
Sherman worked in private practice as an attorney at a small Boston firm during the 1980s, as well as at Eckert Seamans Cherin & Mellot, LLC., in the 1990s. From 1991 to 1993, Sherman also served as the assistant attorney general of Massachusetts and chief of the state's Consumer Protection Division. In 1993, Sherman then served as a special counsel for the state attorney general.

In 1999, Sherman co-founded the Boston office of the Miami law firm Greenberg Traurig. In this capacity, Sherman focused his practice on corporate investigations and consumer protection.

From 2002 to 2004, Sherman was co-lead counsel representing claimants in a sexual abuse lawsuit against the Roman Catholic Archdiocese of Boston.

Sherman was a fundraiser for Obama for America, raising at least $500,000, and has personally donated more than $80,000 to Democratic candidates and organizations.

Sherman was appointed to the United States Holocaust Memorial Council in January 2013.

Sherman has served as a board member of the Beth Israel Deaconess Medical Center and the Children's Trust Fund. He has also been co-chair of the Boston Arts Academy Annual Gala Benefit and the Boston CURE Gala for the Epilepsy Foundation.

=== Ambassadorship ===
On July 25, 2013, Sherman was nominated by President Barack Obama to be U.S. Ambassador to Portugal. The United States Senate confirmed Sherman by voice vote in February 2014.

Sherman presented his credentials to the President of the Portuguese Republic, Aníbal Cavaco Silva, in Lisbon on May 3, 2014.

Sherman's first official act as ambassador was speaking at the Carlucci American International School of Lisbon for the graduation of its senior class on 1 June 2014.

Ambassador Sherman became notable for his enthusiastic support of the Portugal national football team during the 2016 UEFA European Championship. He uploaded several humorous videos to social media featuring himself draped on the Portuguese flag and wearing the team jersey and holding bets with U.S. ambassadors in other countries.

Shortly after his ambassadorship, he was awarded the Order of Prince Henry by President Marcelo Rebelo de Sousa, during a ceremony at the Hall of Ambassadors, in Belém Palace. The Portuguese President remarked that "by definition, the North American Ambassadors are always magnificent Ambassadors, but [Sherman] was, if that is possible, more magnificent than the magnificent."

=== Novo Banco ===
On October 13, 2017, Lone Star Funds, owner of 75% of the bank Novo Banco, announced Sherman would become a member of the General and Supervising Committee (Portuguese: Conselho Geral e de Supervisão) of the latter.

=== Currently ===
Sherman is a senior advisor and advisory board member at Rasky Partners.

== Honours ==
- Grand-Cross of the Order of Prince Henry, Portugal (March 10, 2017).

Diplomatic posts
Preceded by Allan J. Katz	U.S. Ambassador to Portugal; April 5, 2014–January 20, 2017	Succeeded by Herro Mustafa; Acting
