= Stanley Hornbeck =

American professor and diplomat

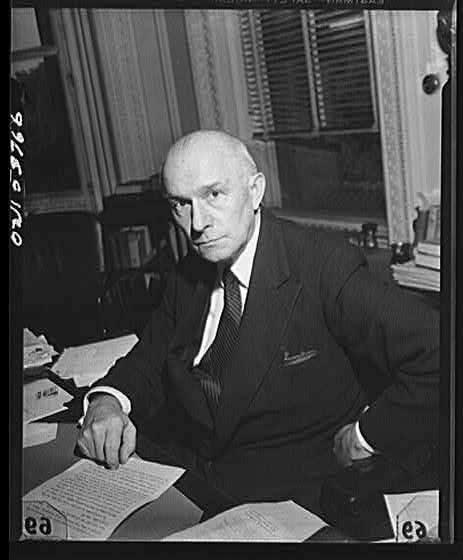

2nd United States Ambassador to the Netherlands
- In office December 8, 1944 – March 7, 1947
- President: Franklin D. Roosevelt; Harry S. Truman
- Preceded by: Anthony Joseph Drexel Biddle Jr.
- Succeeded by: Herman B. Baruch

Personal details
- Born: May 4, 1883 Franklin, Massachusetts, US
- Died: December 12, 1966 (aged 83) Washington, D.C., US
- Resting place: Arlington National Cemetery
- Spouse: Vivienne Barkalow
- Education: University of Colorado; University of Denver (BA); Christ Church, Oxford (BA); University of Wisconsin (PhD)
- Profession: Professor, diplomat

Military service
- Allegiance: United States
- Branch/service: United States Army
- Rank: Colonel
- Unit: United States Army Ordnance Department; Military Intelligence Corps
- Battles/wars: World War I

Stanley Kuhl Hornbeck (May 4, 1883 – December 10, 1966) was an American professor and diplomat. A Rhodes scholar and the author of eight books, he had a thirty-year career in government service. He was chief of the State Department Division of Far Eastern Affairs (1928–1937), a special adviser to Secretary of State Cordell Hull (1937–1944), and ambassador to the Netherlands (1944–1947).

== Background ==
Hornbeck was born in Franklin, Massachusetts, the son of a Methodist minister, and studied at the University of Colorado and the University of Denver. While attending the University of Colorado, he served as a founding father of the Beta Tau chapter (founded in 1900) of Beta Theta Pi. He also attended University of Oxford as the first Rhodes Scholar from Colorado from 1903 to 1907, before receiving his Doctor of Philosophy from the University of Wisconsin in 1911 under Paul Reinsch. His dissertation discussed most favored nation clauses in economic treaties. Hornbeck joined the Foreign Service in 1921.

== Career ==
=== China ===
Hornbeck taught in various institutions in China from 1909 to 1913, beginning at Hangchow University. In 1916, he published his first book on politics in China and Japan, Contemporary Politics in the Far East, which was widely disseminated.

He was in China during the Xinhai revolution, though did not see any battles. Hornbeck was a major proponent of Open Door Policy.

=== WWI ===
During World War I, the future ambassador served in army ordnance and military intelligence as a captain; later, in the Army Reserve, he would become a colonel.

=== Diplomacy ===
Hornbeck continued to be a major proponent of Open Door Policy. In 1935 he stated the policy had to be maintained as conceding it would be conceding China to Japan, considering the danger of the formation of Manchukuo.

In November 1941, contemptuous of the Japanese capacity to challenge US strength, Hornbeck dismissed the fears of a young Foreign Service officer, Charles W. Yost, that Japan might initiate war out of desperation over the oil embargo imposed by the United States. Then, ten days before the attack on Pearl Harbor, after drafting with Secretary of State Cordell Hull a hardline memo laying down conditions for relaxation of the sanctions, Hornbeck wagered that Japan would relent and that war was not imminent. The note that Hull sent the Japanese on November 26, 1941, said that Japan would have to withdraw from Southeast Asia and China before the United States would resume the oil shipments. Confident that his tough approach would cause Japan to back down, Hornbeck wrote in a memorandum the following day:

In the opinion of the undersigned, the Japanese Government does not desire or intend or expect to have forthwith armed conflict with the United States.... Were it a matter of placing bets, the undersigned would give odds of five to one that the Japan and the United States will not be at "war" on or before March 1 (a date more than 90 days from now, and after the period during which it has been estimated by our strategists that it would be to our advantage for us to have "time" for further preparation and disposals).

For more than a decade, Hornbeck had urged the United States to pursue a policy of economic pressure on Japan. Although Hornbeck had been derided by historians for his ill-founded wager, some observers argue that he understood as well as any other US policymaker at the time the irreconcilable conflict between Japan and US interests. Some observers believe that had his recommendations been followed much earlier, Japanese power would have been significantly weakened.

=== Hiss case ===
On September 2, 1948, Hornbeck wrote a letter to Alger Hiss as follows:

September 2, 1948
Dear Alger:
In pursuance of what I volunteered to you when we talked last week, I want you to know that, having known you well for ten years and having had very close association with you in the Department of State during the years from 1939 to 1944—when you were my assistants and one of my "sparring partners"—I should be glad to testify in an forum that I have never known or though of your having been engaged in any doubtful or questionable activities, or of your having given indication of radical leanings or sympathies; that I at no time have suspected you of being a Communist or "fellow traveler"; that, short of conclusive proof, I would not now believe that you ever were either of these or that you ever have been knowingly a member of any "corp" chosen, favored or used by Communists in service of a Communist, subversive or disloyal purposes; that I have never in any connection found you to have been other than truthful; and that I consider you a gifted, high-principled, devoted and loyal citizen.
With cordial and all best wishes,
I am,
Yours ever,
Stanley K. Hornbeck
(Former Chief, Division of Far Eastern Affairs, Department of State;
Former Adviser on Political Relations, Department of State)

William L. Marbury, Jr., Hiss's attorney in his libel suit against Whittaker Chambers, noted "Alger had been working for Hornbeck during the time when he had been meeting with General Clay on problems relating to China, and I was, therefore, especially interested in what Hornbeck had to say."

=== Later life ===
In 1954, Horneck was awarded a Guggenheim Fellowship for his contributions to Far East studies and political science.

== Death ==
Stanley Kuhl Hornbeck died age 83 in December 1966, in Washington, D.C.

== References and further reading ==
- Doenecke, Justus D., ed. (1981). The Diplomacy of Frustration: The Manchurian Crisis of 1931–1933 as Revealed in the Papers of Stanley K. Hornbeck. Stanford, Calififornia: Hoover Institution Press. ISBN 0-817973-11-7. OCLC 7734629.
- Friedrich, K. Marlin (1974). In Search of a Far Eastern Policy: Joseph Grew, Stanley Hornbeck, and American-Japanese Relations, 1937–1941 (PhD). Pullman, Wash.: Washington State University. OCLC 1594164.
- Hu, Shizhang (1995). Stanley K. Hornbeck and the Open Door Policy, 1919-1937. Westport, Connecticut: Greenwood Press. ISBN 0313293945.
- Hu, Shizhang (1997). "Stanley K. Hornbeck", Notable U.S. Ambassadors Since 1775: A Biographical Dictionary, edited by Cathal J. Nolan, Westport, Connecticut: Greenwood Press. ISBN 0313291950
- McCarty, Jr., Kenneth G. (1970). Stanley K Hornbeck and the Far East, 1931–1941 (PhD). Durham, North Carolina: Duke University. OCLC 2773921.

== External sources ==
- Kenneth B. Pyle (2007); Japan Rising. PublicAffairs. ISBN 978-1-58648-417-0
- Hoover Institution Archives: Stanley Hornbeck papers

Diplomatic posts
Preceded by Anthony Joseph Drexel Biddle Jr.	United States Ambassador to the Netherlands; 1944–1947	Succeeded by Herman B. Baruch
