= Thomas F. Stephenson =

American diplomat

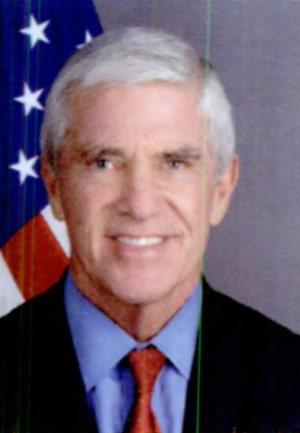

United States Ambassador to Portugal
- In office November 21, 2007 – June 21, 2009
- President: George W. Bush; Barack Obama
- Preceded by: Al Hoffman, Jr.
- Succeeded by: Allan J. Katz

Personal details
- Born: Thomas Fleetwood Stephenson; 1942 (age 83–84) Wilmington, Delaware, U.S.
- Party: Republican
- Spouse: Barbara
- Children: 3
- Education: Harvard University (BA, MBA); Boston College (JD)

Thomas Fleetwood Stephenson (born 1942) is an American businessman and a former Ambassador to Portugal.

== Career ==
Stephenson was born and raised in Wilmington, Delaware, and graduated from Harvard College with a degree in economics. He received an MBA from Harvard Business School and a JD from Boston College Law School. He worked at Fidelity Management Company, where he served as president of a venture capital operation, Fidelity Ventures. In 1987, he left Fidelity to join Sequoia Capital.

Stephenson has also served as a director of BigTray, LandaCorp, BenefitPoint, Chapters Online, Chipsoft.com, Sequana Therapeutics, Adesso Healthcare Technology Services, and SteriGenics International.

== Other activities ==
Stephenson is a major California Republican donor. He was major donor to the inauguration committee of George W. Bush. In 2001, Stephenson led an effort to attract Silicon Valley executives to the Republican Party. Stephenson serves as a top fundraiser for the 2016 presidential candidacy of Jeb Bush.

He returned to Sequoia Capital as a general partner after resigning as Ambassador. He formerly served as finance chairman of the California Republican Party.

He has held various leadership positions within the Republican National Committee as well as Republican campaign teams. He serves on the board of advisors of the Stanford Institute for Economic Policy Research and formerly served on the board of overseers of the Hoover Institution. He has been active in many organizations which included Conservation International, the Council of American Ambassadors, the Woodrow Wilson International Center for Scholars, the Lincoln Club of Northern California, and the John F. Kennedy Center for the Performing Arts. He also served on the Precourt Institute Energy Advisory Council at Stanford and on the MIT Energy Initiative External Advisory Board. He formerly served on many boards and committees that were part of the Tufts New England Medical Center in Boston.

Diplomatic posts
Preceded by Al Hoffman, Jr.	United States Ambassador to Portugal; 2007–2009	Succeeded by Allan J. Katz
