= George Edward Glass =

American businessman and diplomat

George Edward Glass GCIH CvNSC
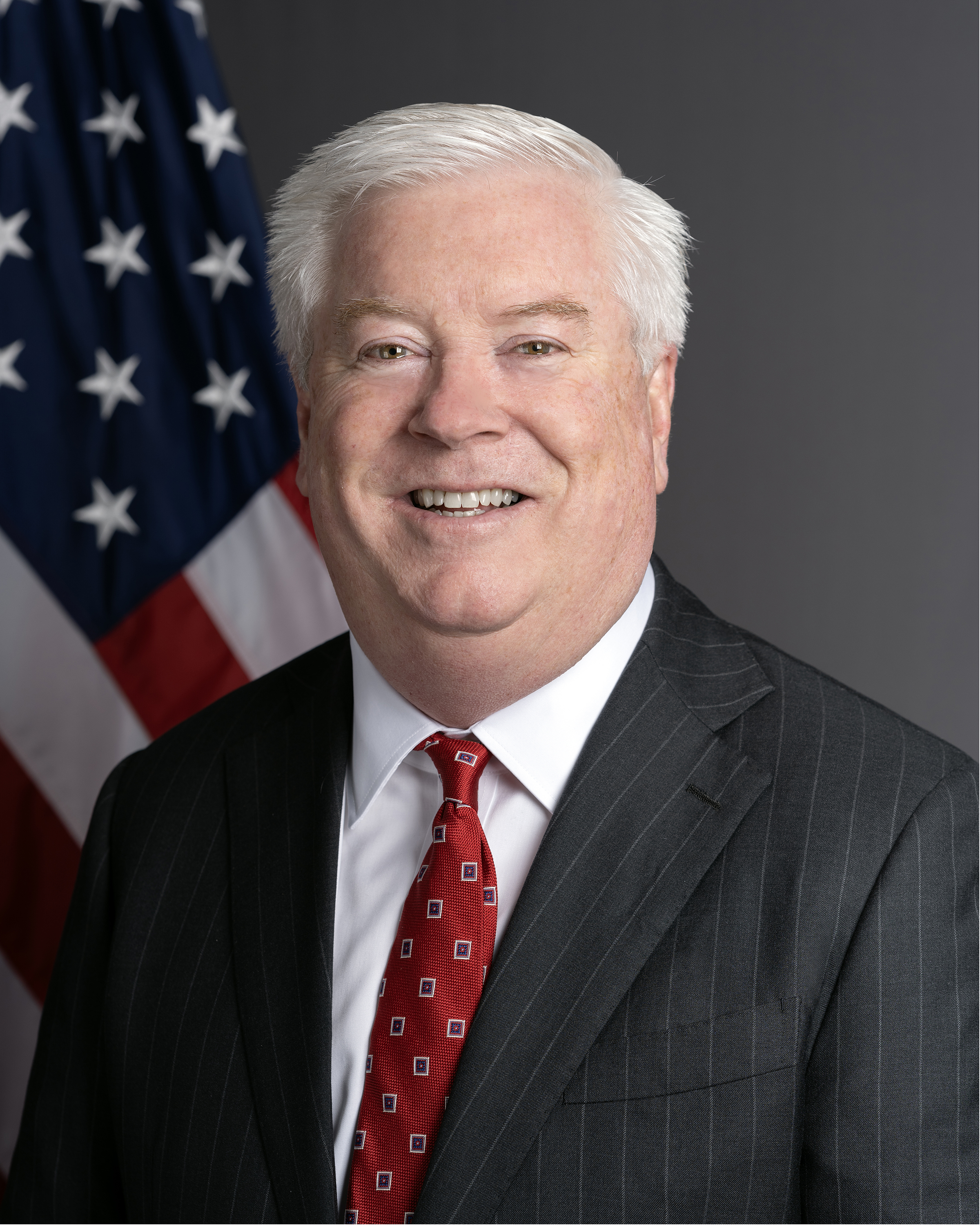
- Official portrait, 2025

32nd United States Ambassador to Japan
- Incumbent
- Assumed office April 18, 2025
- President: Donald Trump
- Preceded by: Rahm Emanuel

United States Ambassador to Portugal
- In office August 30, 2017 – January 13, 2021
- President: Donald Trump
- Preceded by: Robert A. Sherman
- Succeeded by: Randi Levine

Personal details
- Born: 1960 (age 65–66) Eugene, Oregon, U.S.
- Party: Republican
- Spouse: Mary Glass
- Children: 3
- Education: University of Oregon (BS)
- Occupation: Businessman

George Edward Glass GCIH CvNSC (born 1960) is an American businessman and diplomat who has served as the 32nd United States ambassador to Japan since April 2025. A member of the Republican Party, he served under President Donald Trump as the United States ambassador to Portugal from 2017 to 2021.

== Early life ==
George Glass was born in Eugene, Oregon and attended South Eugene High School. He holds a Bachelor of Science degree from the University of Oregon. Glass served as Alumni President at the University of Oregon.

== Business career ==
George Glass was the founder, President, and Vice Chairman of Pacific Crest Securities, a technology focused investment bank in Portland, Oregon from 1990 to 2014. After Pacific Crest Securities was purchased by KeyBank, he founded the real estate development firm MGG Development LCC. Glass has also served as a trustee for the Oregon Health Sciences University and for the University of Oregon.

== Diplomatic career ==
=== U.S. ambassador to Portugal ===
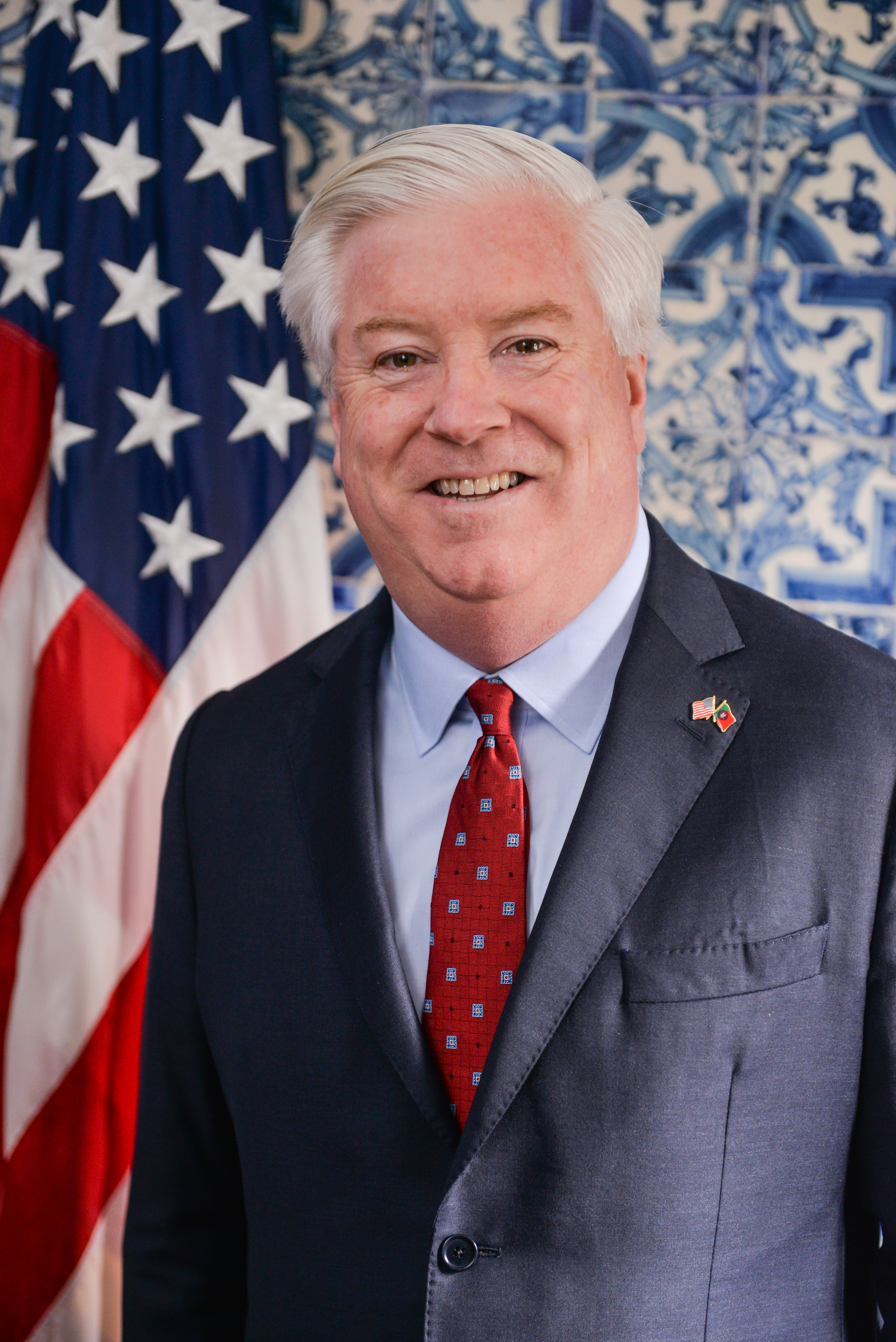
Glass's photo when he was then Ambassador to Portugal in 2020

In 2017, George Glass was nominated by President Donald Trump to become Ambassador Extraordinary and Plenipotentiary of the United States of America to the Republic of Portugal. The United States Senate confirmed his nomination on August 3, 2017. He presented his credentials to the President of the Portuguese Republic, Marcelo Rebelo de Sousa, on August 25, 2017.

During his tenure as Ambassador, Glass has sought to increase economic activity between the United States and Portugal, including on agricultural and energy issues.

Glass has been vocal in criticizing Chinese investments in strategic sectors in Portugal. He has cast aspersions on a proposed takeover by China Three Gorges of the Portuguese energy company EDP. He has also been outspoken about U.S. concerns about the role Huawei might play in future 5G networks in Portugal and elsewhere. In September 2020, in an interview to Expresso about the new 5G technology, Glass stressed that Portugal choose "between its friends and allies and China", hinting at consequences in defense partnerships if Portugal chose to work with China, and further threatened to end the distribution of natural gas through the Port of Sines if the construction of the new terminal were to be delivered to China. An editorial in Público referred to the threat as a diktat and an ultimatum; Foreign Minister Augusto Santos Silva reacted to these remarks by asserting that "in Portugal, the decision-makers are the Portuguese authorities, who decide which are Portugal's interests, within the framework of the Constitution and Portuguese law," and a similar message underscoring national autonomy was issued by President Marcelo Rebelo de Sousa.

In March 2020, he wrote an op-ed in Público about disinformation and the COVID-19 pandemic, in which he accused China of launching a propaganda campaign to try and shift the responsibility of the pandemic to the United States.

Glass and his wife, Mary, have also been active in supporting Portuguese communities recovering from wildfires and in reforestation. In October 2017, George and Mary visited communities affected by the wildfires of that year in the district of Viseu. In October 2019, they founded the U.S-Portugal Friendship Forest near Leiria and hosted the signing of a sister-park initiative between North Cascades National Park and the Portuguese Peneda-Gerês National Park.

In September 2019, Glass had named the Ambassador's Residence in Lisbon after former Ambassador and Secretary of Defense Frank Carlucci, who served as Ambassador to Portugal from 1975 to 1978.

On November 14, 2019, Secretary of State Mike Pompeo presented Glass with the Sue Cobb Award for Exemplary Diplomatic Service.

Glass left his post on January 13, 2021. Shortly before he left the post, he was awarded the Order of Prince Henry the Navigator by President Marcelo Rebelo de Sousa, during a ceremony at Belém Palace.

=== U.S. ambassador to Japan ===
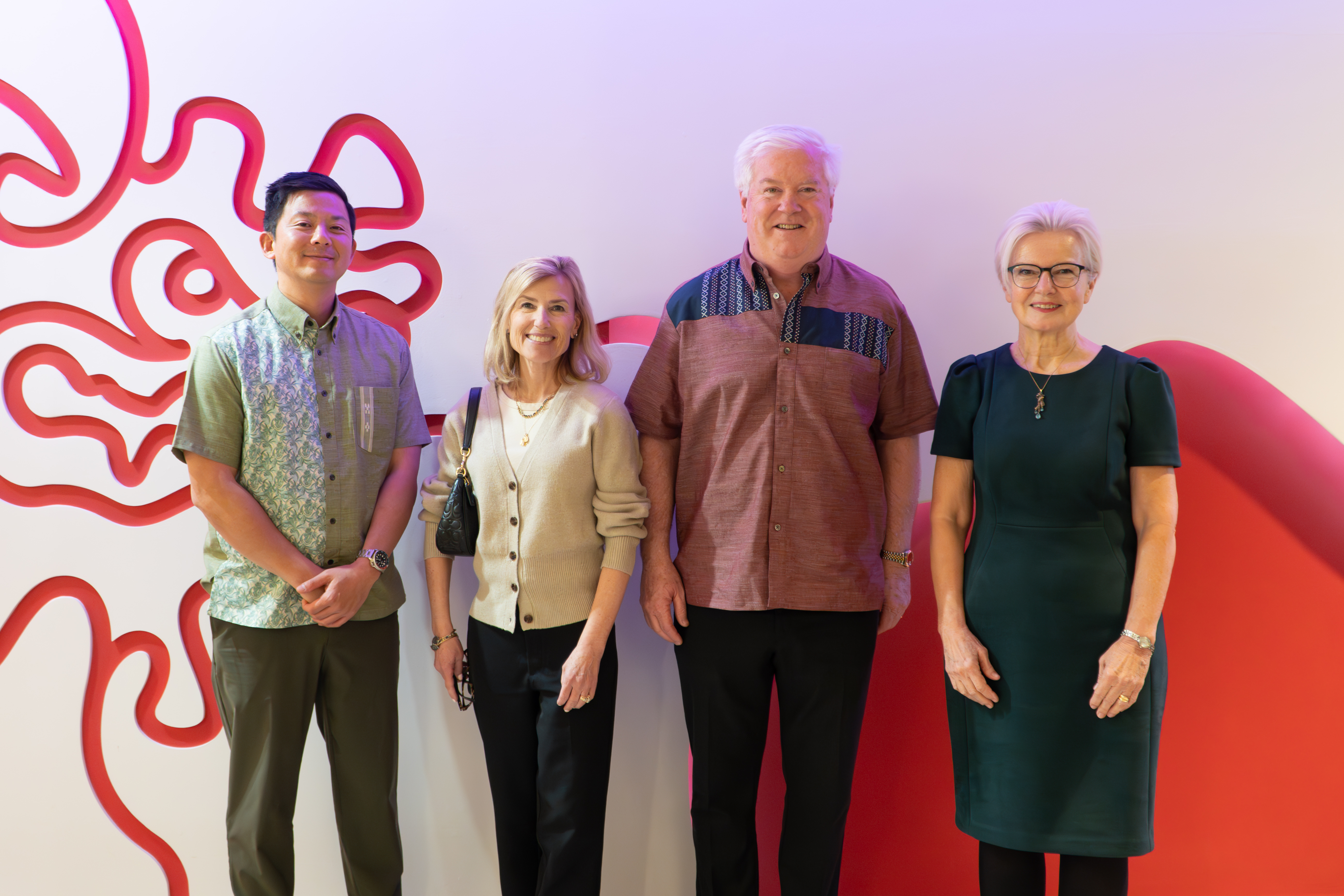
George and Mary Glass (center) during a visit to the Okinawa Institute of Science and Technology

On December 17, 2024, President-elect Donald Trump announced his nomination of George Glass to serve as U.S. Ambassador to Japan. Trump explained his nomination by noting Glass “will bring his business acumen to the Ambassador's position”. According to The Japan Times, George Glass's eldest son previously lived in Japan.

During his confirmation hearing before the Senate Foreign Relations Committee on March 13, 2025, George Glass explained that he was likely to press Japan to pay more for the presence of American military personnel on its soil. He also announced that his priority would be to strengthen ties between the two countries on defense issues, notably by co-producing military equipment. Glass also specified that he would work to reduce the US trade deficit with Japan.

The U.S. Senate confirmed Glass's nomination on April 8, 2025. Glass arrived in Japan and presented his credentials on April 18.

== Honors ==
- Grand Cross of the Order of Prince Henry the Navigator, Portugal (December 18, 2020).
- Knight of the Order of the Immaculate Conception of Vila Viçosa

Diplomatic posts
Preceded by Robert A. Sherman	United States Ambassador to Portugal; 2017–2021	Succeeded by Kristin M. Kane; Chargé d’Affaires
Preceded by Rahm Emanuel	United States Ambassador to Japan; 2025–present	Incumbent
