= Emil Bobu =

Romanian Communist activist and politician

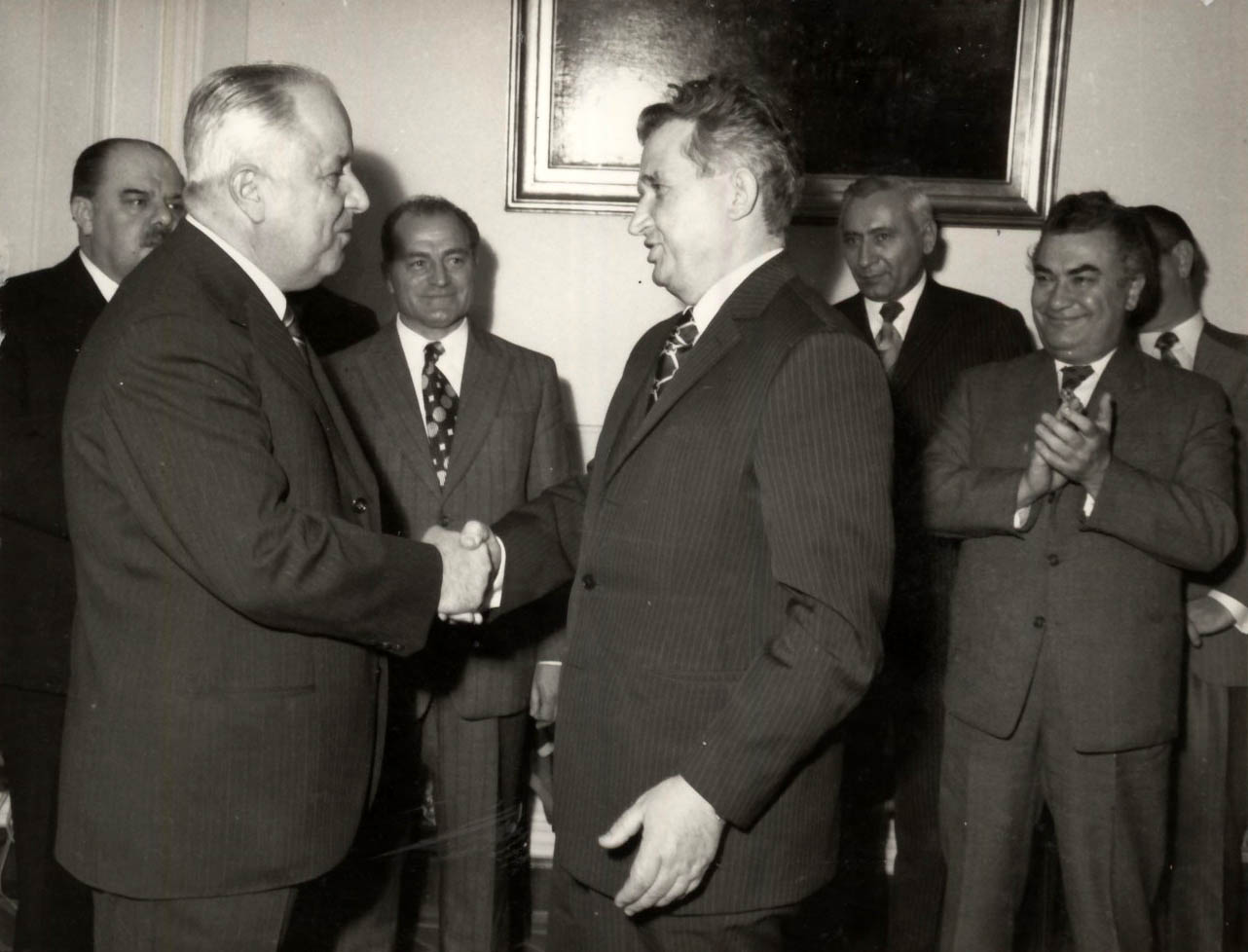
- Bobu (left) honored by Nicolae Ceaușescu on his 50th birthday, 1977
- Born: 22 February 1927; Vârfu Câmpului, Botoșani County, Kingdom of Romania
- Died: 12 July 2014 (aged 87); Bucharest, Romania
- Resting place: Domnești Cemetery, Bucharest
- Occupations: Lathe operator; Military prosecutor; Politician
- Organization: Romanian Communist Party
- Criminal charge: Aggravated manslaughter
- Criminal penalty: 10 years
- Criminal status: Paroled
- Spouse: Maria Bobu

Emil Bobu (22 February 1927 – 12 July 2014) was a Romanian Communist activist and politician, who served as Interior Minister from 1973 to 1975 and as Labor Minister from 1979 to 1981. He was an influential figure in the later years of the Communist regime until his downfall during the 1989 Revolution.

== Biography ==
Bobu was born to a peasant family in Vârfu Câmpului, Botoșani County. He attended seven grades of primary school and the school for Romanian Railways (CFR) employees, subsequently becoming a lathe operator at the CFR workshop in Iași from 1943 to 1945. He entered the Union of Communist Youth in 1941 and the Romanian Communist Party (PCR) in November 1945. From that time until 1947, he was responsible for youth issues in the communist organization at the Iași CFR workshop. During 1948, by which time a communist regime had been established, he studied in Bucharest to become a teacher at the CFR schools. In 1949, he attended law school at the University of Iași, and in 1950 he was named principal legal counsel at the Justice Ministry. Also that year, he became a military prosecutor in Bucharest, receiving the rank of lieutenant, and in 1952, he was promoted to the general prosecutor's office with the rank of captain. He studied law at the university level between 1954 and 1957. Meanwhile, at the administrative section of the party's central committee, he was named law instructor (March–November 1953) and deputy section chief (1953–1958), as well as instructor at the central committee's mass organizations section. He also attended courses at the Ștefan Gheorghiu Academy during this period.

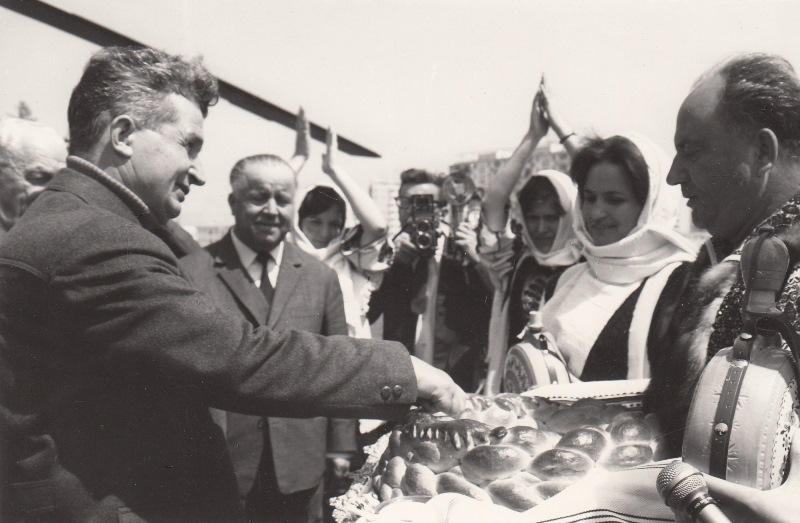
Ceaușescu and Bobu in Suceava, 1970

In 1959, he became president of the executive committee of the Suceava Region's council and a member of the regional party committee's bureau (1965–1966). In June 1960, he became a supplementary member of the central committee, advancing to full member in July 1965, shortly after Nicolae Ceaușescu came to power. Between 1968 and 1973, he was first secretary of the Suceava County party committee and president of the county council's executive committee. In December 1972, he became an adviser to Ceaușescu. He was Interior Minister from March 1973 to March 1975.

He was a supplementary member of the PCR's executive political committee (CPEx) from July to November 1974, when he rose to full member, holding the position until the 1989 Revolution. From 1975 to 1979, he was a vice president of the Council of State. Starting in 1975, he headed the central committee's section for military and judicial affairs, becoming head of its cadres section in 1977. He served as Labor Minister and head of the General Trade Union Federation of Romania from January 1979 to February 1981. During the Ilie Verdeț government, he was deputy premier from January 1980 to May 1982. Until the latter date, he headed the national council of agriculture, food industry and water management. The following month, he became president of the council for economic and social organization, remaining until the Revolution. From 1984 until December 1989, he was general secretary of the PCR for organizational matters, and in November–December 1989, he sat on the central committee's permanent bureau. According to Ion Stănescu, who was Tourism Minister at the time, the fourteenth and final party congress of November 1989 saw flagging enthusiasm among attendees. It was Bobu who encouraged delegates with vigorous applause and shouted slogans, getting up and clapping after every phrase, sometimes interrupting Ceaușescu with applause before he had finished speaking.

He was a member of the Great National Assembly between 1961 and 1989, variously representing Suceava, Iași, Dâmbovița, and Dolj counties. In 1981, he was awarded the title Hero of Socialist Labor. Political scientist Vladimir Tismăneanu describes him as part of a group of "deeply subservient" and "utterly incompetent" figures with whom Ceaușescu surrounded himself in the 1980s. Starting in 1982, as part of her personal court of hagiographers, he was the undisputed second-in-command of Elena Ceaușescu; described by Tismăneanu as "her most obedient servant", they were together responsible for all personnel appointments. In their study of the regime's last years, Roger Kirk, United States Ambassador to Romania from 1985 to 1989, and Romanian diplomat Mircea Răceanu assert that Bobu was "arguably the most powerful Romanian after the two Ceaușescus", although his status within the party structure slipped following the thirteenth congress in November 1984.

On 20 December 1989, Ceaușescu sent Bobu, together with Prime Minister Constantin Dăscălescu, to Timișoara, ordering them to try and quell the revolutionary activities there. The mission ended in failure and they returned to Bucharest early the following morning. On the morning of 22 December, he accompanied Nicolae and Elena Ceaușescu in their flight by helicopter as far as the presidential retreat at Snagov. Left there with a promise by the dictator that a second helicopter would arrive, Bobu and Manea Mănescu left after twenty minutes in an ARO vehicle driven by a Securitate officer. An angry crowd ambushed their car near the center of Găești, beating the driver and throwing a few punches at Bobu as well. Placed under arrest by the local prosecutor, Bobu was found to be carrying 6,000 lei in his pockets and a list of organizers of the "enemy demonstration in Timișoara". In February 1990, the Bucharest Military Tribunal pronounced sentence on four former CPEx members; Bobu, found guilty of complicity in genocide for his role in issuing orders to fire during the Revolution, received a term of life imprisonment and confiscation of all his personal property. The well-publicised proceedings have been described as a "show trial"; Bobu and three other prominent defendants pleaded guilty after delivering rehearsed, self-critical testimony that they later renounced. The state prosecutor filed an appeal in the case of the four, and in April 1993, the Supreme Court of Justice found that Bobu had committed not genocide but complicity in aggravated manslaughter and complicity in attempted aggravated manslaughter. His sentence was thus altered to ten years' imprisonment and five years' loss of political rights. In June 1993, the military tribunal accepted his request for parole, and he was released. Bobu died in 2014 in a Bucharest hospital, as the result of a brain ischemia. He was buried in the city's Domnești (Ghencea 2) Cemetery.

He married Maria Cristian in 1957; she served as Justice Minister from 1987 until the 1989 revolution.
