= List of ambassadors of the United States to Timor-Leste =

Ambassador of the United States to Timor-Leste
- Seal of the United States Department of State

- Flag of a United States ambassador

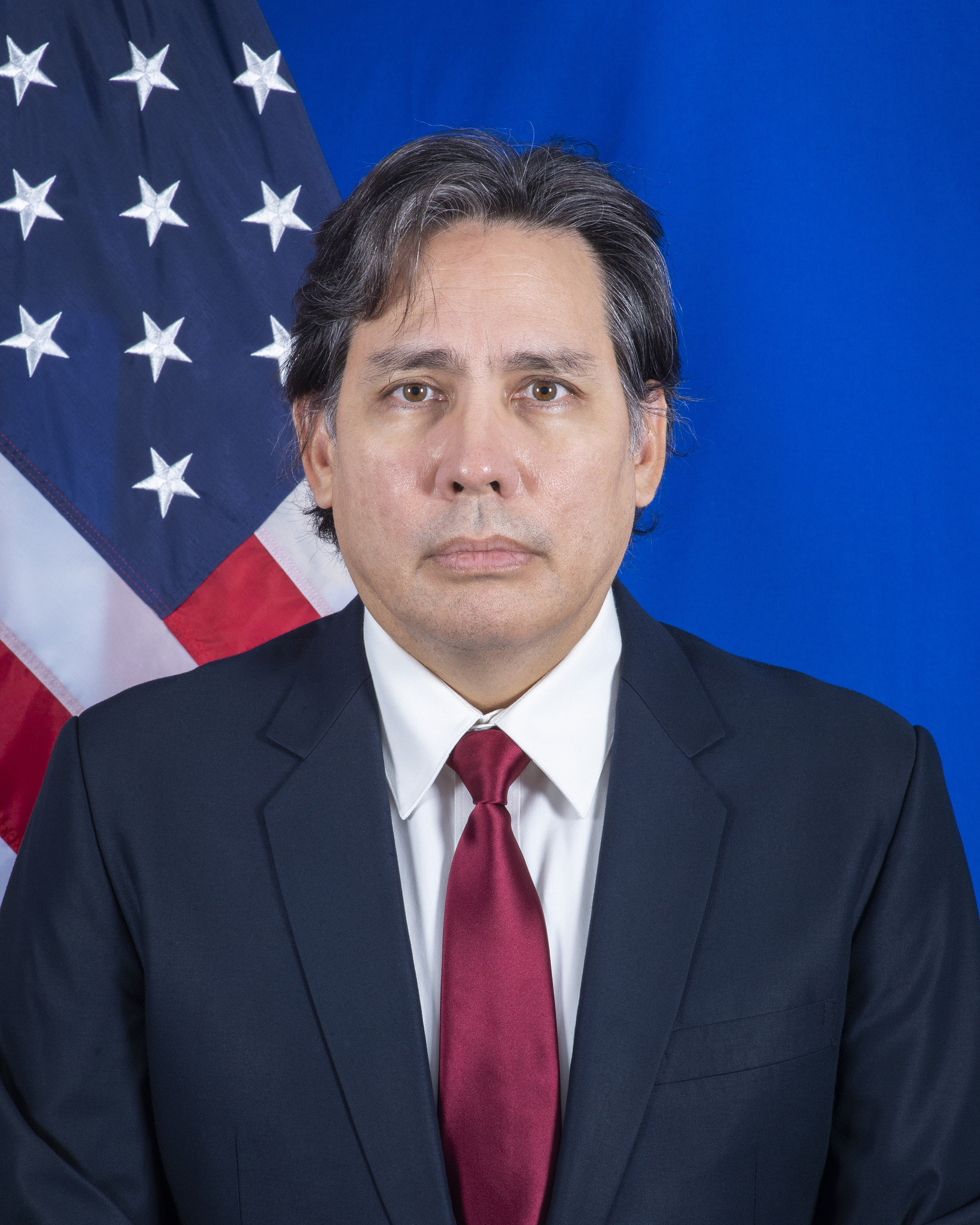
- Incumbent; Bruce Begnell; Chargé d'affaires since July 1, 2025
- Nominator: The president of the United States
- Appointer: The president with Senate advice and consent
- Inaugural holder: Shari Villarosa as Chargé d'Affaires ad interim
- Formation: May 20, 2002
- Website: U.S. Embassy - Dili

The diplomatic post of United States Ambassador to Timor-Leste (formerly known as East Timor) was created after the formalization of the independence of Timor-Leste from Indonesia on May 20, 2002. The United States recognized the new nation immediately, and an embassy was opened in Dili.

== Ambassadors ==
Name	Title	Appointed	Presented credentials	Terminated mission	Notes
Shari Villarosa – Career FSO	Chargé d'Affaires ad interim	May 20, 2002		December 10, 2002	
Grover J. Rees III	Ambassador Extraordinary and Plenipotentiary	November 15, 2002	December 10, 2002	September 29, 2006	
W. Gary Gray – Career FSO	Chargé d'Affaires ad interim	September 30, 2006	Unknown	July 4, 2007	
Hans G. Klemm – Career FSO	Ambassador Extraordinary and Plenipotentiary	May 30, 2007	July 4, 2007	February 20, 2010	
Judith Fergin – Career FSO	Ambassador Extraordinary and Plenipotentiary	August 9, 2010	September 16, 2010	September 20, 2013	
Karen Clark Stanton – Career FSO	Ambassador Extraordinary and Plenipotentiary	November 18, 2014	January 16, 2015	December 22, 2017	
Kathleen M. Fitzpatrick – Career FSO	Ambassador Extraordinary and Plenipotentiary	November 21, 2017	January 19, 2018	November 18, 2020	
C. Kevin Blackstone – Career FSO	Ambassador Extraordinary and Plenipotentiary	January 6, 2021	March 19, 2021	August 2, 2021	
Thomas Daley – Career FSO	Chargé d'Affaires ad interim	August 2, 2021		August 12, 2023	
Marc Weinstock	Chargé d'Affaires ad interim	August 15, 2023		July 1, 2024	
Donna Ann Welton – Career FSO	Ambassador Extraordinary and Plenipotentiary	May 7, 2024	July 16, 2024	February 24, 2025	
Marc Weinstock	Chargé d'Affaires ad interim	February 24, 2025		June 16, 2025	
Rodney LeGrand – Career FSO	Chargé d'Affaires ad interim	June 16, 2025		July 1, 2025	
Bruce Begnell – Career FSO	Chargé d'Affaires ad interim	July 1, 2025		Incumbent	

== See also ==
- Timor-Leste–United States relations
- Foreign relations of Timor-Leste
- Ambassadors of the United States
