= Timor-Leste–United States relations =

- Timor-Leste: United States

Timor-Leste–United States relations are the bilateral relations between Timor-Leste (formerly known as East Timor) and the United States.

== History ==
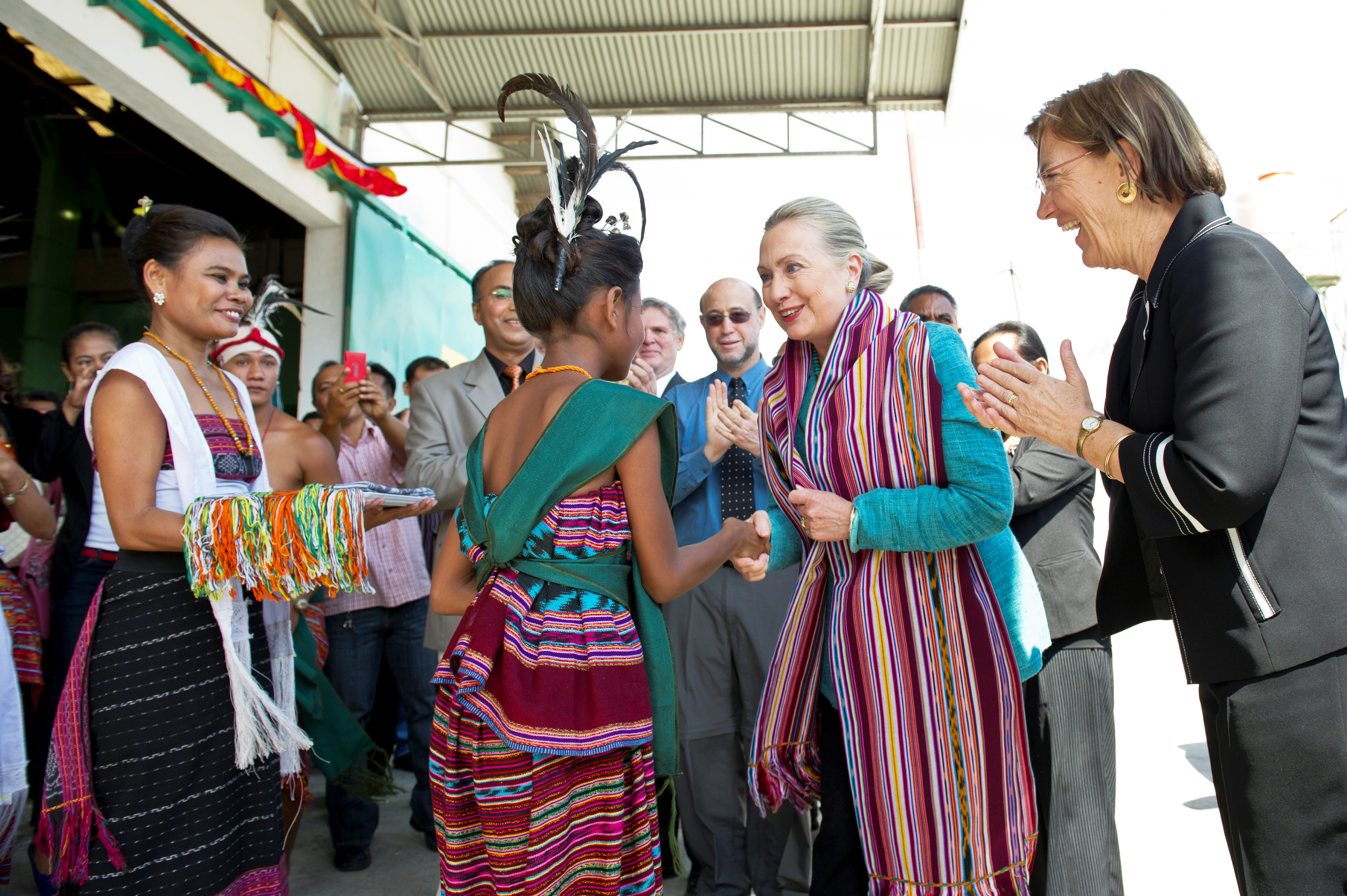
U.S. Secretary of State Hillary Clinton, accompanied by U.S. Ambassador to Timor-Leste Judith Fergin, is greeted by traditional dancers at the Cooperativa Cafe Timor in Dili, Timor-Leste, September 6, 2012

The US supported Indonesia's invasion and occupation of East Timor in 1975.

Timor-Leste maintains an embassy in Washington, D.C., as well as a Permanent Mission in New York City at the United Nations. The United States has a large bilateral development assistance program, $20.6 million in 2007, and also contributes funds as a major member of a number of multilateral agencies such as the Asian Development Bank and the World Bank. The U.S. Peace Corps has operated in Timor-Leste since 2002, but it suspended operations in May 2006 due to unrest and instability.

The U.S. embassy in Timor-Leste is located at Praia de Coqueiros, Dili. Donna Ann Welton is the Ambassador Extraordinary and Plenipotentiary. Marc Weinstock is the Deputy Chief of Mission. Mark Anthony White is the USAID Mission Director. Roberto Quiroz is the Political/Economic/Commercial Affairs Officer. Major Aaron Harris is the Office of Defense Cooperation chief.

== Aid ==
=== Political Process Development ===
USAID began supporting the development of effective democratic electoral and political processes in Timor-Leste in 1999. Between 2001 and 2008, USAID gave $2,215,997 to the International Foundation for Electoral Systems to develop an electoral framework and processes, $3,619,134 to the International Republican Institute to develop political parties, and $3,728,490 to the National Democratic Institute to increase citizen participation and local governance.

== See also ==
- Foreign relations of the United States
- Foreign relations of Timor-Leste
