= Jennifer Anne Moses =

American writer and painter

- Education: Tufts University
- Occupations: Writer, painter
- Spouse: Stuart P. Green
- Children: 3
- Relatives: Alfred H. Moses (father)
- Writing career
- Genres: Memoir, short fiction, young adult fiction
- Notable works: Bagels and Grits: A Jew on the Bayou (2007); You've Told Me Before (2025)
- Website: jenniferannemoses.com

Jennifer Anne Moses is an American writer and painter. Her books include the memoirs Food and Whine (1999) and Bagels and Grits: A Jew on the Bayou (2007), the novel-in-stories Visiting Hours (2012), and the short story collections The Man Who Loved His Wife (2021) and You've Told Me Before (2025). Much of her work concerns Jewish life in the United States, particularly in the South, where she lived for about thirteen years. Her paintings, which combine Jewish and Southern imagery, have been exhibited in Washington, D.C., Louisiana and New Jersey.

== Early life and education ==
Moses was raised in Northern Virginia, the second of four children of Carol Moses and Alfred H. Moses, a Washington lawyer who later served as United States Ambassador to Romania. She attended a private school before moving to a public high school, and went on to Tufts University. After college she worked at Mademoiselle and at Reader's Digest Books, and later at Bon Appétit in Los Angeles.

== Career ==
=== Journalism and memoir ===
Moses began her writing career with articles for The Washington Post. Her essays and journalism have since appeared in The New York Times, The Wall Street Journal, Time and USA Today, among other publications.

Her first book, Food and Whine (Simon & Schuster, 1999), is a memoir of a year in which she was raising three young children, her mother was diagnosed with cancer, and the family was preparing to move to Baton Rouge, Louisiana. In Baton Rouge, Moses volunteered at an AIDS hospice, studied Hebrew, and at 41 became an adult bat mitzvah. She described those years in a second memoir, Bagels and Grits: A Jew on the Bayou (University of Wisconsin Press, 2007).

=== Fiction and poetry ===
Moses's short story "Girls Like You" was included in New Stories from the South: The Year's Best, 1998. Her novel-in-stories Visiting Hours (Fomite, 2012), about AIDS patients and their caregivers, drew on her years as a hospice volunteer. She has also written the young adult novels Tales from My Closet (Scholastic, 2014) and The Art of Dumpster Diving (Turner, 2020), and the novel The Book of Joshua (University of Wisconsin Press, 2018).

She published a poetry collection, Domesticity, in 2023. A novel co-written with her husband, Stuart P. Green, was published by UL Press in October 2026.

=== Painting ===
Moses drew as a child but stopped in her teens to concentrate on writing and returned to visual art after moving to Louisiana.

Writing in Image, Caroline Langston described Moses's paintings as following many conventions of outsider and visionary art, with saturated color, mixed media and collage, and text including Hebrew prayers, often painted on salvaged wooden window frames. Langston compared the work to that of Clementine Hunter and Howard Finster. Moses's series Pages of the Torah was exhibited at the Sixth and I Historic Synagogue in Washington, D.C., in 2012, and her work was shown at the George Segal Gallery at Montclair State University in 2013.

== Reception ==
Kirkus Reviews called Food and Whine witty and moving and suggested Moses might be the successor to Erma Bombeck that publishers were looking for. Publishers Weekly described Bagels and Grits as an "absorbing memoir" and praised its humor.

You've Told Me Before was reviewed by The Jerusalem Post, which called Moses "a master of the short story genre"; by Hadassah Magazine, whose reviewer wrote that it "may position Moses as this generation's Grace Paley"; and by the Jewish Book Council, which found its characters more hopeful and self-aware than familiar types in Jewish fiction. Foreword Reviews praised the collection's humor and characters but found that several stories end abruptly.

== Personal life ==
Moses is married to Stuart P. Green, a law professor at Rutgers University. They have three children.

== Works ==
=== Memoir ===
- Food and Whine: Confessions of an End-of-the-Millennium Mom. Simon & Schuster. 1999.
- Bagels and Grits: A Jew on the Bayou. University of Wisconsin Press. 2007.

=== Fiction ===
- Visiting Hours. Fomite. 2012.
- Tales from My Closet. Scholastic. 2014. (young adult)
- The Book of Joshua. University of Wisconsin Press. 2018.
- The Art of Dumpster Diving. Turner Publishing. 2020. (young adult)
- The Man Who Loved His Wife. Mayapple Press. 2021. (stories)
- You've Told Me Before. University of Wisconsin Press. 2025. (stories)
- The Rebbe of Baton Rouge (with Stuart P. Green). UL Press. 2026.

=== Poetry ===
- Domesticity. Blue Jade Press. 2023.
