= Maria Bobu =

Romanian communist politician

Maria Bobu (born Maria Cristian; 1 March 1925 – 2007) was a Romanian communist politician. She served as Minister of Justice from 3 October 1987 to 22 December 1989, when the Romanian Revolution toppled the regime.

Born in Măgura, Buzău County in a family of modest means, she completed 4 years of elementary school. She joined the Romanian Communist Party in 1945 and attended the Faculty of Law of the University of Bucharest from 1950 to 1952. In 1957, she married Emil Bobu, also a communist politician.
