= Vârfu Câmpului =

- Commune
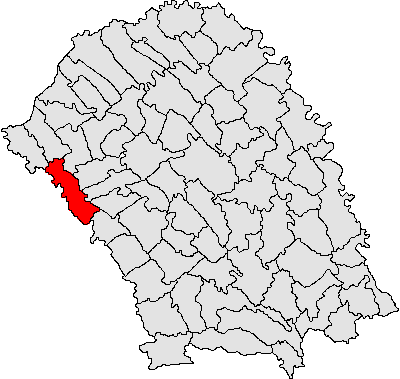
- Location in Botoșani County

- Location in Romania
- Coordinates: 47°51′N 26°20′E
- Country: Romania
- County: Botoșani
- Subdivisions: Dobrinăuți-Hapăi, Ionășeni, Lunca, Maghera, Pustoaia, Vârfu Câmpului

Government
  - Mayor (2024–2028): Dumitru Ovidiu Domunco (PNL)
- Area: 72.84 km^{2} (28.12 sq mi)
- Elevation: 285 m (935 ft)
- Population (2021-12-01): 7,077
  - Density: 97/km^{2} (250/sq mi)
- Time zone: EET/EEST (UTC+2/+3)
- Postal code: 717450
- Area code: +40 x31
- Vehicle reg.: BT
- Website: primariavarfucampului.ro

Vârfu Câmpului is a commune in Botoșani County, Western Moldavia, Romania. It is composed of six villages: Dobrinăuți-Hapăi, Ionășeni, Lunca, Maghera, Pustoaia, and Vârfu Câmpului.

== Natives ==
- Emil Bobu (1927 – 2014), Communist activist and politician who served as Interior Minister and Labor Minister
- Alexandru Zub (born 1934), historian, biographer, essayist, political activist, and academic
