= Karen Clark Stanton =

American diplomat (born 1955)

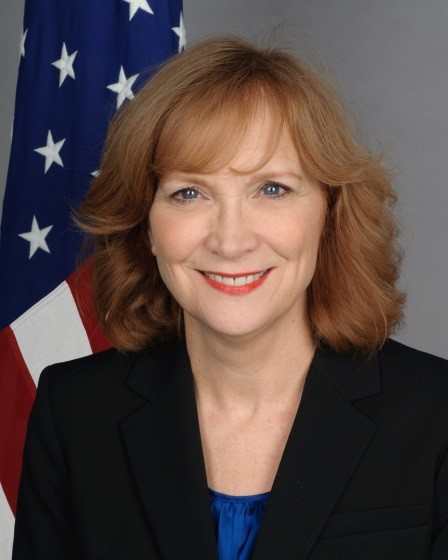

United States Ambassador to East Timor
- In office November 17, 2014 – December 22, 2017
- President: Barack Obama; Donald Trump
- Preceded by: Judith Fergin
- Succeeded by: Kathleen M. Fitzpatrick

Personal details
- Born: 1955 (age 70–71)
- Spouse: William Stanton
- Education: University of Michigan; National War College

Karen Clark Stanton (born 1955) is a diplomat and former United States Ambassador to East Timor. Stanton was nominated by President Barack Obama July 31, 2013 and confirmed by the Senate November 19, 2014.

== Early life and education ==
Stanton is from Michigan, the daughter of Clifford Clark and Lillian Clark née Gibbons. Stanton earned a B.A. at the University of Michigan. She later earned an M.S.S. at the National War College in 2000, where her thesis addressed "Controlling Weapons of Mere Destruction."

== Career ==
After Stanton joined the Foreign Service, she held early positions that included working at the State Department's Operations Center as a Watch Officer, and she was a Special Assistant to Secretary of State George P. Shultz. She served as a consular officer at the U.S. Embassy in Beijing, China, from 1987 to 1990, experiencing the Tiananmen Square protests of 1989. From 1991 to 1993 she served at the embassy in Islamabad, Pakistan. She then returned to the U.S. for a two-year assignment as a consular officer in the Bureau of Consular Affairs at the State Department in Washington, D.C. Stanton then returned to the embassy in Beijing, where she served from 1995 to 1998.

Stanton then attended the National War College, where she received an M.S.S. in 2000.

Stanton then became an assignments officer in the Bureau of Human Resources, and served as a management counselor at the embassy in Singapore from 2004 to 2008. She then joined the Bureau of East Asian and Pacific Affairs.

In July 2013, when Stanton was executive director of the State Department's Bureau of East Asian and Pacific Affairs, she was nominated to be ambassador to Timor-Leste, but due to a backlog of appointments was not confirmed by the Senate for 401 days. While the United States Senate Committee on Foreign Relations had earlier approved her nomination, Senate filibusters delayed confirmations of many nominees, including Stanton, and Sen. Lindsey Graham (R-South Carolina) threatened to delay all executive nominations until more witnesses testified about the attack on the U.S. Consulate in Benghazi, Libya. She was finally confirmed in November 2014.

Once she arrived in Timor-Leste, Stanton presented her credentials to President Taur Matan Ruak on January 16, 2015.

== Personal ==
Stanton is married to William Stanton, a retired Foreign Service officer, who served as Director of the Center for Asia Policy at National Tsing Hua University in Taiwan and now as vice-president of National Yan Min University. They have two daughters.

Diplomatic posts
Preceded by Judith Fergin	United States Ambassador to East Timor; 2014–2017	Succeeded by Kathleen M. Fitzpatrick
