= Thomas W. Simons Jr. =

American diplomat and academic (born 1938)

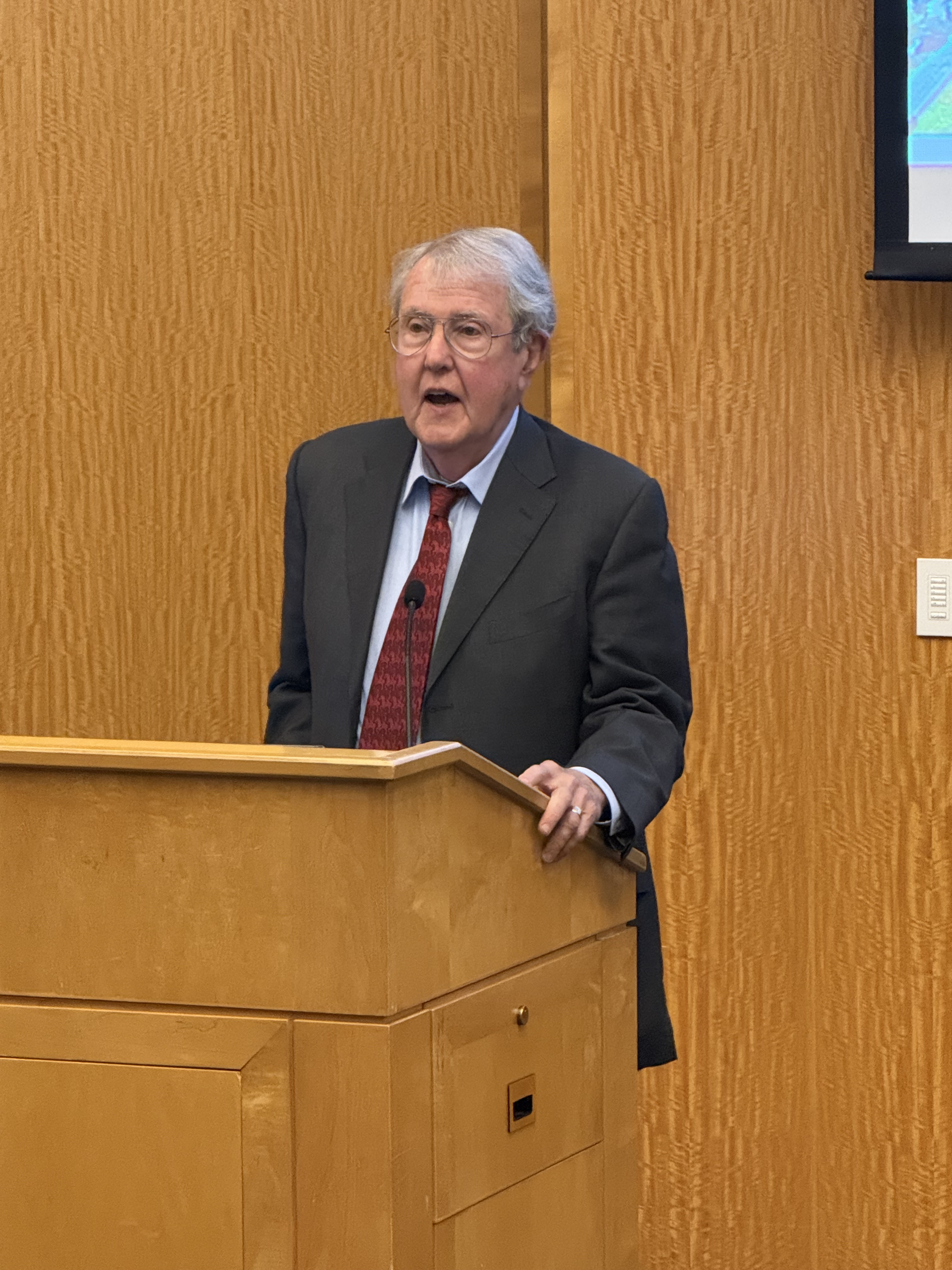
- Thomas W. Simons, Jr. speaking at Harvard in 2026

United States Ambassador to Poland
- In office 1990–1993
- Preceded by: John R. Davis Jr.
- Succeeded by: Nicholas Andrew Rey

United States Ambassador to Pakistan
- In office 1996–1998
- Preceded by: John Cameron Monjo
- Succeeded by: William B. Milam

Personal details
- Born: Thomas Rose; September 4, 1938 (age 88)
- Education: Yale University; Harvard University

Thomas Winston Simons Jr. (born September 4, 1938) is an American diplomat and academic. He served as ambassador to Poland from 1990 to 1993, and ambassador to Pakistan from 1996 to 1998.

Born in Crosby, Minnesota, Simons is of German, English and Scots-Irish descent. He attended Karachi Grammar School and Sidwell Friends School and is a graduate of Yale and Harvard. Simons escorted Duke Ellington during his tour of the Middle East and Pakistan.

In 1969, he worked as a deputy to the U.S. Ambassador to Poland, Walter Stoessel, and assisted in making connections which eventually resulted in President Richard M. Nixon's historic visit to China.

He taught at Stanford University upon his retirement from the United States Foreign Service, and holds visiting appointments at Harvard and Cornell. Prior to joining the Foreign Service, Simons was an adjunct professor at Brown University.

Diplomatic posts
Preceded by John R. Davis Jr.	United States Ambassador to Poland; 1990–1993	Succeeded by Nicholas Andrew Rey
Preceded by John Cameron Monjo	United States Ambassador to Pakistan; 1995–1998	Succeeded by William B. Milam
