= Nicholas Andrew Rey =

American diplomat and businessman

- Nicholas Andrew Rey

United States Ambassador to Poland
- In office December 21, 1993 – October 25, 1997
- President: Bill Clinton
- Preceded by: Thomas W. Simons Jr.
- Succeeded by: Daniel Fried

Personal details
- Born: January 23, 1938 Warsaw, Poland
- Died: January 13, 2009 (aged 70) Washington, D.C., U.S.

Nicholas Andrew Rey (23 January 1938, Warsaw, Poland – 13 January 2009, Washington, D.C.) was an American diplomat, businessman, and United States Ambassador to Poland (from 1993 to 1997), affiliated with the Democratic Party.

== Life ==
Rey was born in Warsaw, Poland, and as an infant (at about two years old) fled the country with his family right after the beginning of World War II. In 1946 he became a naturalized United States citizen. He graduated from Princeton and Johns Hopkins universities, and worked as an investment banker at Merrill Lynch and Bear Stearns. Rey died in Washington, D.C. A memorial service was held on January 30 in Holy Trinity Catholic Church in Washington D.C. He was married, and had three children. He was a descendant of the Polish poet Mikołaj Rey.

== Political career ==
Rey was appointed the United States' ambassador to Poland by President Bill Clinton, and served in that role from 1993 to 1997. He worked with many prominent Polish-Americans, for instance Edward Rowny and Mark Brzezinski, and participated in several campaigns of the Democratic Party.

== See also ==
- Mikołaj Rej

== Notes ==
Diplomatic posts
Preceded by Thomas W. Simons Jr.	United States Ambassador to Poland; 1993–1997	Succeeded by Daniel Fried
