= Măgura, Buzău =

Măgura
- Commune
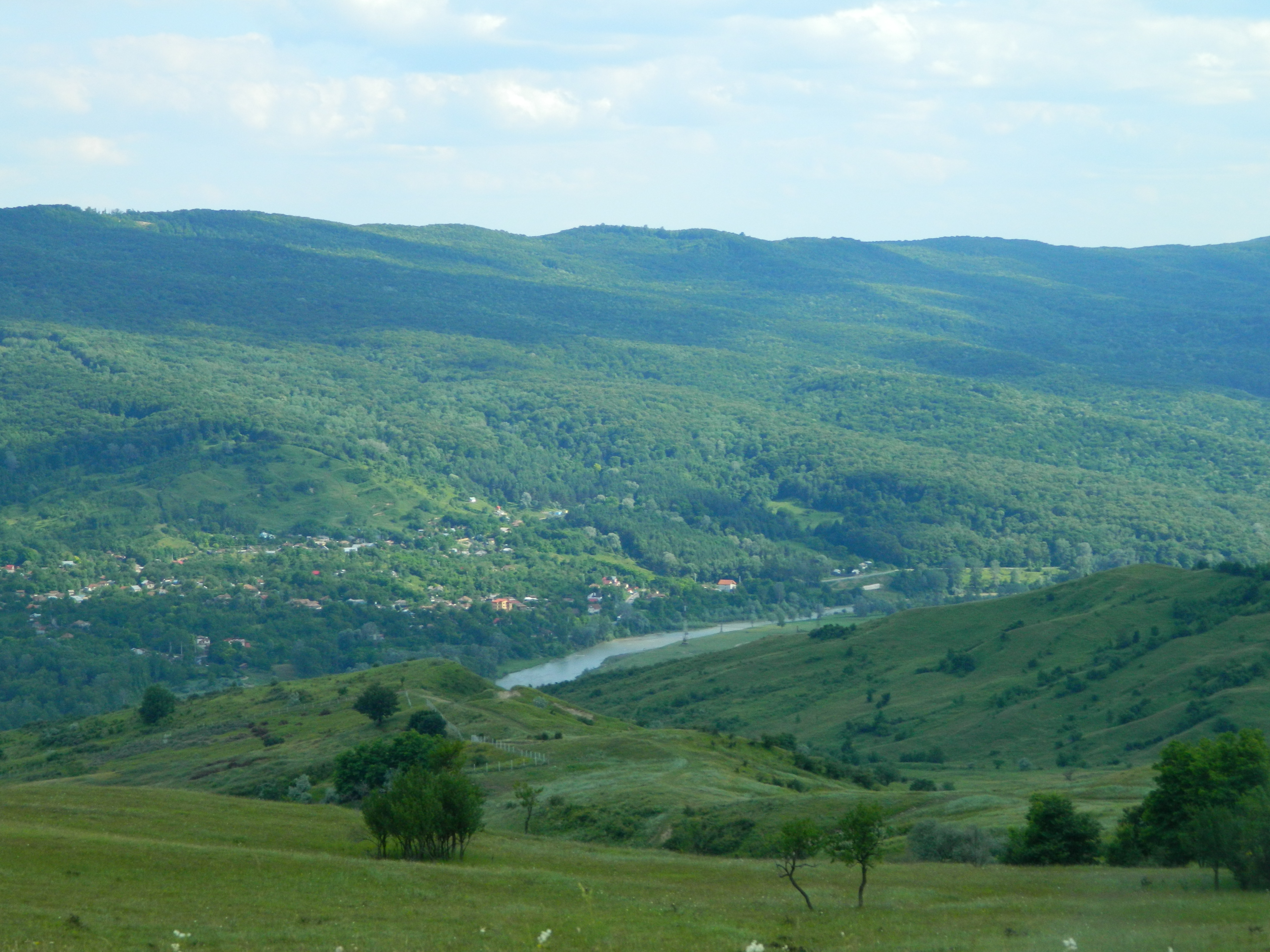
- Ciuta village, on the banks of the Buzău River

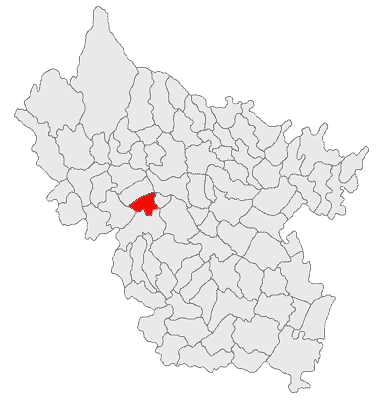
- Location in Buzău County

- Location in Romania
- Coordinates: 45°16′44″N 26°34′43″E
- Country: Romania
- County: Buzău
- Subdivisions: Măgura, Ciuta

Government
  - Mayor (2020–2024): Daniel Cîrstea (PSD)
- Area: 27.4 km^{2} (10.6 sq mi)
- Elevation: 179 m (587 ft)
- Population (2021-12-01): 2,089
  - Density: 76.2/km^{2} (197/sq mi)
- Time zone: UTC+02:00 (EET)
  - Summer (DST): UTC+03:00 (EEST)
- Postal code: 127320, 127321
- Area code: +(40) 238
- Vehicle reg.: BZ
- Website: www.comunamagura.ro

Măgura is a commune in Buzău County, Muntenia, Romania, located on the right bank of the Buzău River, in the hillside next to the Carpathian Mountains' curvature. It is composed of two villages, Ciuta and Măgura. It also included Ojasca and Unguriu villages from 1968 until 2004, when these were split off to form Unguriu Commune.

== Landmarks ==
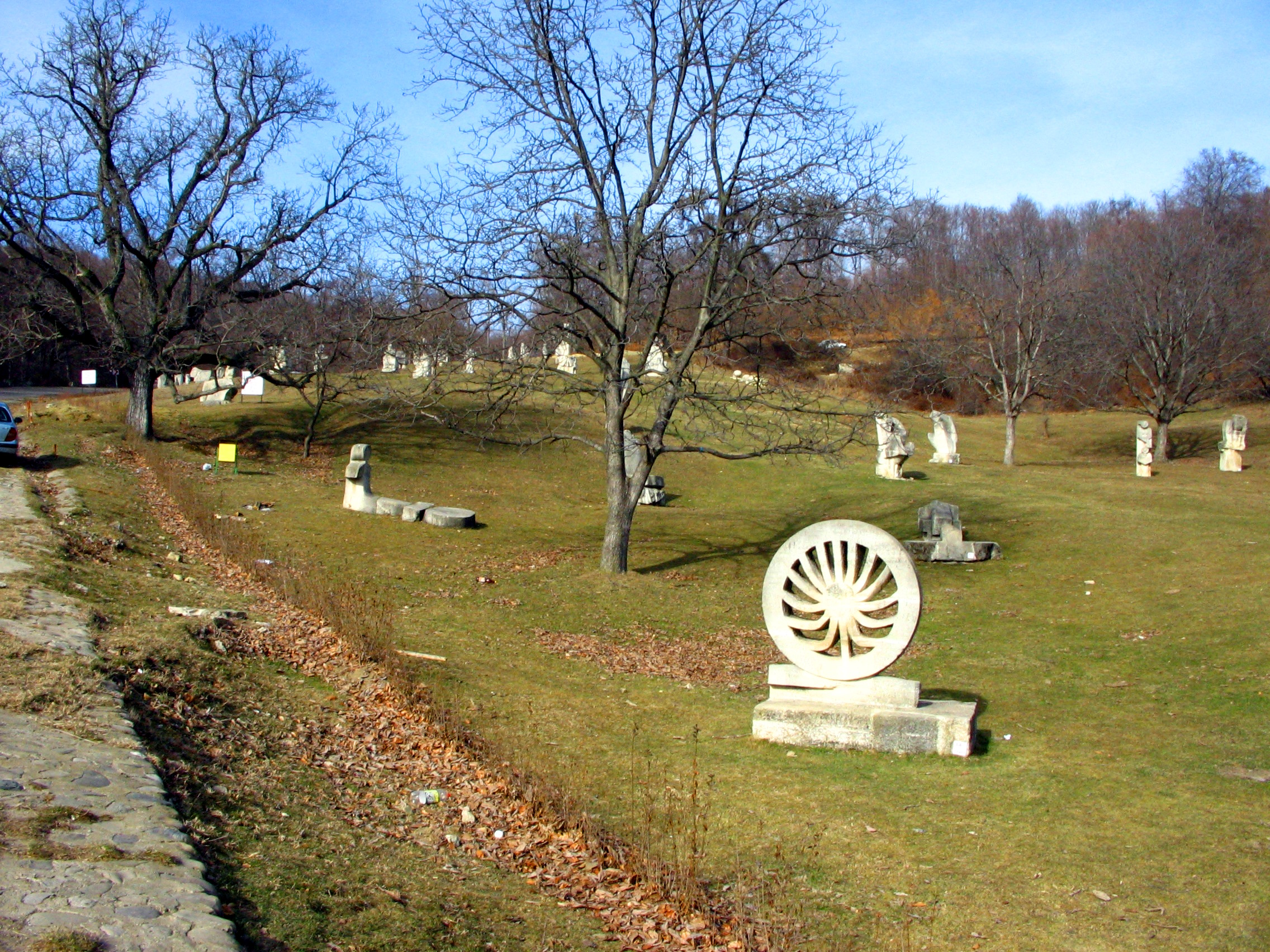
Statues made at the Măgura sculpture camp, 1970-1986

In the close vicinity of Măgura, lies the Ciolanu Monastery, a Romanian Orthodox monastery built in the 16th century.

The Măgura sculpture camp was an event that took place during the summers of the years 1970–1986, when students and graduates of the Bucharest Academy of Art were training in sculpture. Their works of art are now visible on the meadows in front of the monastery, making up a large open-air art museum.

Historical population
Year	Pop.	±%
2002	2,260	—
2011	2,241	−0.8%
2021	2,089	−6.8%
Source: Census data

== Natives ==
- Maria Bobu (1925–2007), communist politician

== Notes ==
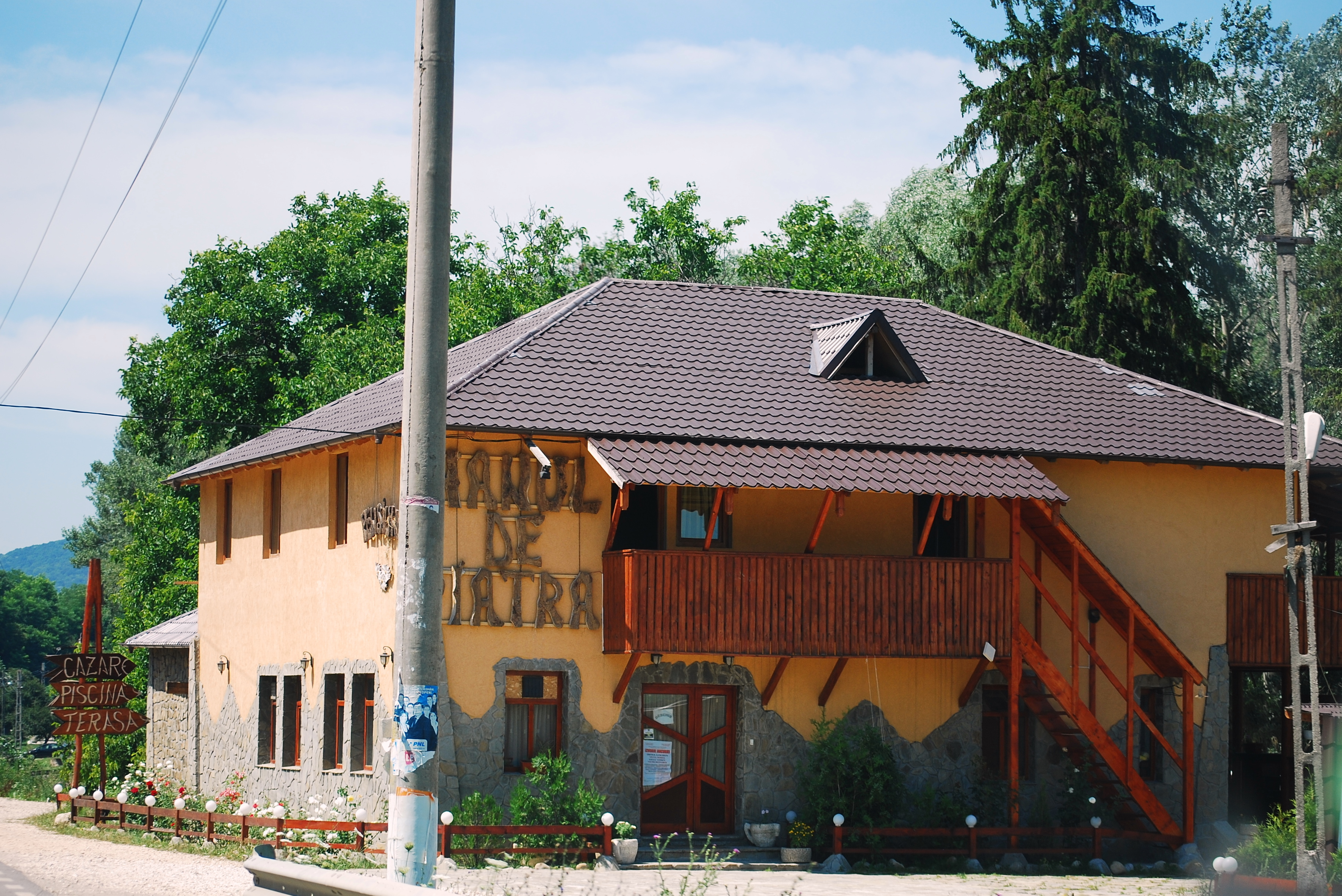
The Stone Inn in Ciuta

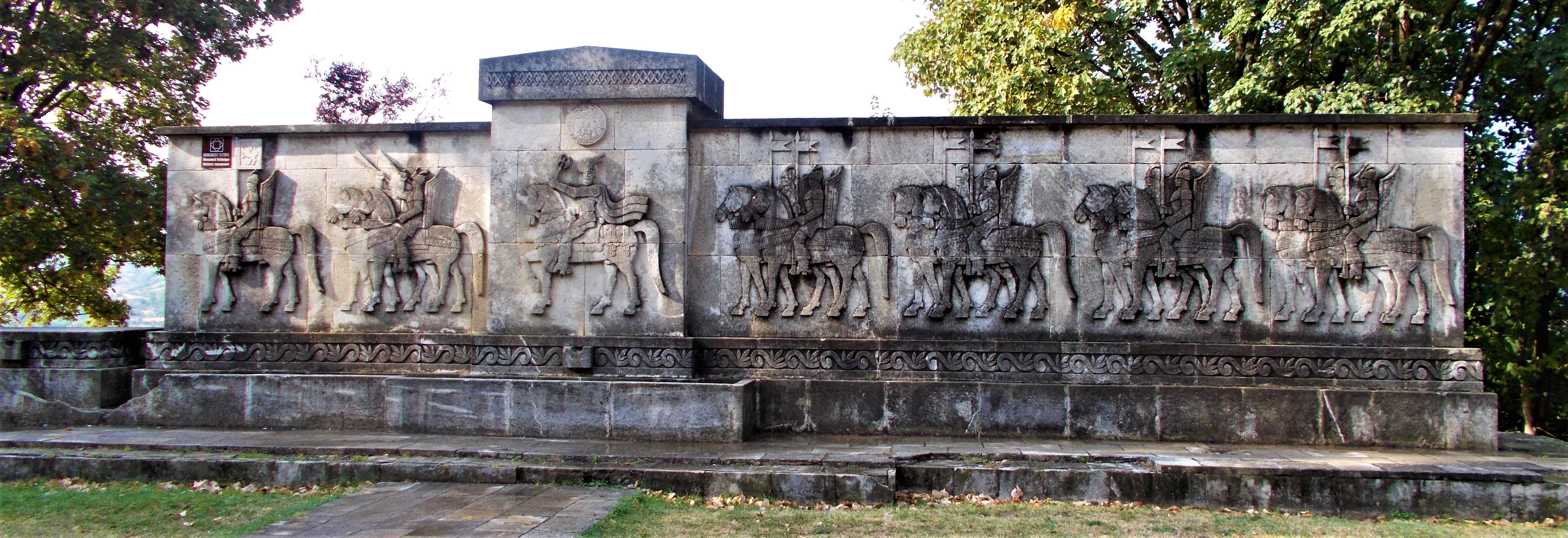
The fountain of Michael the Brave in Ciuta

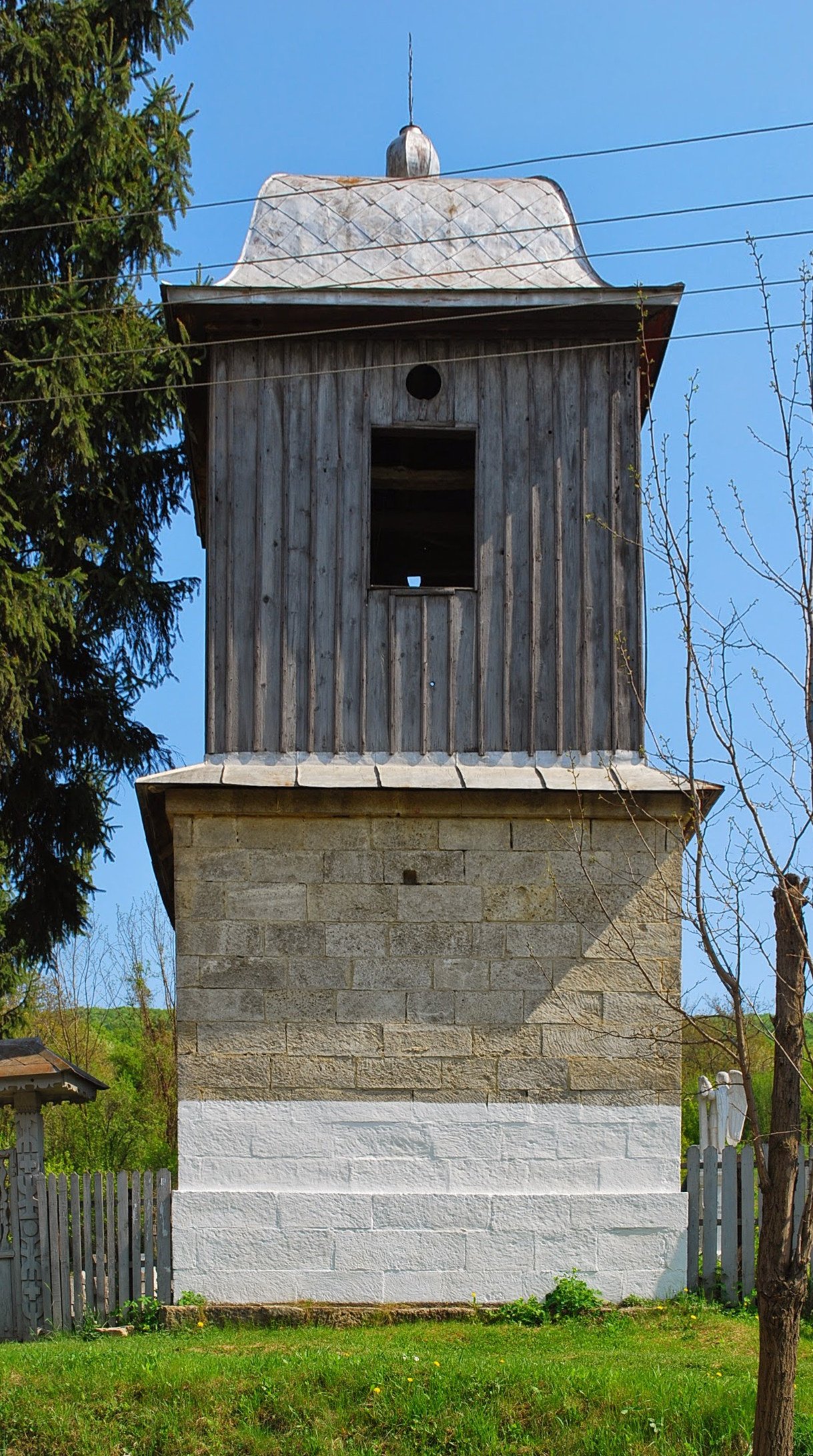
Belfry at the Church of the Presentation of the Virgin Mary in Ciuta
