= David Funderburk =

American politician

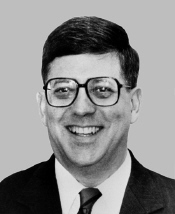

Member of the U.S. House of Representatives from North Carolina's 2nd district
- In office January 3, 1995 – January 3, 1997
- Preceded by: Tim Valentine
- Succeeded by: Bob Etheridge

United States Ambassador to Romania
- In office October 13, 1981 – May 13, 1985
- President: Ronald Reagan
- Preceded by: O. Rudolph Aggrey
- Succeeded by: Roger Kirk

Personal details
- Born: David Britton Funderburk; April 28, 1944 (age 82) Hampton, Virginia, U.S.
- Party: Republican
- Spouse: Betty Funderburk
- Education: Wake Forest University (BA, MA); University of South Carolina (PhD)

David Britton Funderburk (born April 28, 1944) is an American politician and diplomat who served as the Ambassador of the United States to Romania from 1981 to 1985. He later served as a Republican member of the U.S. House of Representatives from North Carolina for one term.

== Early life and education ==
Funderburk was born at Langley Field in Hampton, Virginia as the son of a pastor and school teacher. He grew up in Aberdeen, North Carolina and attended Wake Forest University from 1962 to 1967, earning a B.A. and M.A. He received his Ph.D. in 1974 from the University of South Carolina, with a thesis titled "British policy towards Romania, 1938–1940: A Study in Economic and Political Strategy".

== Career ==
Prior to entering politics, Funderburk worked as a professor of history. He initially taught at Wingate University and then later at the University of South Carolina, Hardin–Simmons University, and Campbell University. He was a Fulbright Scholar who later received Romania's highest award to a foreigner. The University of Bucharest and Campbell University gave him honorary doctorates.

=== Ambassador ===
In 1981, Funderburk was chosen as the U.S. Ambassador to the Socialist Republic of Romania, and served until 1985. In Pinstripes and Reds, a book published in 1987, he described the process by which he was nominated and confirmed to be ambassador, as well as aspects of life in Romania during the administration of Nicolae Ceaușescu.

=== Senate campaign ===
In 1986, Funderburk ran for the U.S. Senate, but was defeated in the Republican primary by incumbent Jim Broyhill.

=== Congress ===
After the Senate race, Funderburk became a professional lecturer and writer. In 1994, he ran for the U.S. House of Representatives and was elected as a Republican to the 104th Congress, coming in as a part of what became known as the Republican Revolution. Funderburk was the first Republican to represent his district since 1901.

Funderburk was an unsuccessful candidate for reelection to the 105th Congress. His defeat was largely blamed on a car accident in which he was involved. Witnesses claimed that he was driving but then switched seats with his wife.

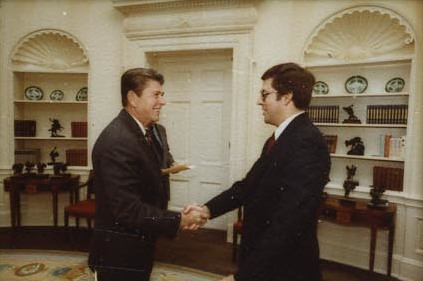
Funderburk greeting President Ronald Reagan in 1981

=== Lobbyist ===
After leaving Congress, Funderburk joined the law firm Kirkpatrick and Lockhart, where he worked as a lobbyist.

== Books ==
- If the Blind Lead the Blind: The Scandal Regarding the Mis-teachings of Communism in American Universities Erwin, N.C.: Carolina Arts and Publishing House, 1978.
- British Policy Toward Romania, 1938–1940 N.p., 1983.
- Pinstripes and Reds: An American Ambassador Caught Between the State Department & the Romanian Communists, 1981–1985 Washington, D.C.: Selous Foundation Press, 1987. ISBN 0-944273-01-7

Diplomatic posts
Preceded by O. Rudolph Aggrey	United States Ambassador to Romania; 1981–1985	Succeeded by Roger Kirk
U.S. House of Representatives
Preceded by Tim Valentine	Member of the U.S. House of Representatives from North Carolina's 2nd congressional district 1995–1997	Succeeded by Bob Etheridge
U.S. order of precedence (ceremonial)
Preceded by Bill Cobey as Former U.S. Representative	Order of precedence of the United States as Former U.S. Representative	Succeeded by Madison Cawthorn as Former U.S. Representative
