= Herman Jay Cohen =

American diplomat (born 1932)

10th Assistant Secretary of State for African Affairs
- In office May 12, 1989 – February 26, 1993
- President: George H. W. Bush
- Preceded by: Chester Crocker
- Succeeded by: George Moose

United States Ambassador to the Gambia
- In office June 24, 1977 – July 21, 1980
- President: Jimmy Carter
- Preceded by: O. Rudolph Aggrey
- Succeeded by: Larry Gordon Piper

Personal details
- Born: February 10, 1932 (age 94) New York City, New York, U.S.
- Education: City College of New York
- Awards: Légion d’Honneur; Order of Leopold II, Belgium

Military service
- Allegiance: United States
- Branch/service: United States Army

Herman Jay "Hank" Cohen (born February 10, 1932) is an American diplomat who served as United States Assistant Secretary of State for African Affairs from 1989 to 1993.

== Career ==
Herman Jay Cohen, born in New York City on February 10, 1932, received a BA in political science from the City College of New York in 1953. He then joined the United States Army, serving until 1955. He received an MA in international relations from American University in 1962. He served in the Foreign Service as a consular officer, attaché, and political counselor until his appointment to the post of United States Ambassador to Gambia and Senegal in 1977, serving until 1980. He later served as Principal Deputy Assistant Secretary of State for Intelligence and Research from 1980-1984, a Special Assistant to the President and Senior Director for Africa on the U.S. National Security Council from 1987-1989, and U.S. Assistant Secretary of State for African Affairs from 1989-1993.

After leaving government, Cohen served as a senior advisor to the Global Coalition for Africa before becoming a professorial lecturer at Johns Hopkins School of Advanced International Studies for twelve years. Currently he is president and CEO of Cohen and Woods International. He also serves on the Board of Directors of Hyperdynamics Oil and Gas and as a consultant for ContourGlobal.

== Bibliography ==
- The Mind of the African Strongman. New Academia. 2015. ISBN 978-0-986-43530-0.
- Intervening in Africa: Conflict Resolution in a Troubled Continent. Palgrave Macmillan. 2000. ISBN 978-0-312-23221-4.
- US Policy Toward Africa: Eight Decades of Realpolitik. Lynne Rienner. 2020. ISBN 9781626378704.

== See also ==
- Operation Solomon
- Angolan Civil War

Diplomatic posts
Preceded by Orison Rudolph Aggrey	U.S. Ambassador to Gambia; 1977 – 1980	Succeeded by
Preceded by Orison Rudolph Aggrey	U.S. Ambassador to Senegal; 1977 – 1980	Succeeded by
Political offices
Preceded by Chester A. Crocker	United States Assistant Secretary of State for African Affairs; 1989 – 1993	Succeeded by George Moose
