= Alfred H. Moses =

American diplomat

United States Ambassador to Romania
- In office December 14, 1994 – August 11, 1997
- President: Bill Clinton
- Preceded by: John R. Davis Jr.
- Succeeded by: James Rosapepe

Personal details
- Born: July 14, 1929 (age 97) Baltimore, Maryland
- Education: Dartmouth College; Princeton University; Georgetown University
- Profession: attorney, diplomat

Alfred H. Moses (born July 24, 1929) is an American attorney and diplomat who served as the U.S. Ambassador to Romania from 1994 to 1997.

== Biography ==
Moses was born and raised in Baltimore, Maryland. After graduating from Baltimore City College (a high school), he attended Dartmouth College from which he received his B.A. degree in 1951. He attended Princeton University's Woodrow Wilson School in 1951–52, served in the U.S. Navy, and received his law degree from Georgetown University in 1956, where he was an editor of the Georgetown Law Review.

Moses joined the Washington, D.C., law firm of Covington & Burling practicing in the areas of litigation, corporate and securities matters, and arbitration. He represented clients in important litigation as trial and appellant counsel and has structured major corporate, financial and real estate transactions nationally and internationally. Except for his public service, he has remained with Covington & Burling. He also serves as chief strategy officer of Promontory Financial Group, a global financial services consulting firm, and is vice chairman of the Promontory Interfinancial Network, a fintech company based in Arlington, Virginia.

Moses was lead counsel to President Jimmy Carter in the "Billygate" hearings in the U.S. Senate. He served as Special Advisor and Special Counsel to President Carter, 1980–81. Under President Bill Clinton, Moses was U.S. Ambassador to Romania, 1994–97, and Special Presidential Emissary for the Cyprus problem 1999–2001. In 2002, he was awarded Romania's Mare Cruce Medal (Order For Merit) by the President of Romania, Ion Iliescu, the only American to have been so honored.

Moses has published articles on Central European and Middle East issues in The New York Times, International Herald Tribune, The Washington Post, The Christian Science Monitor and other publications.

He has been active in religious life and served as President of the American Jewish Committee in 1991–1995.

In July 2018, he published his book Bucharest Diary: An American Ambassador’s Journey.

In May 2023, Moses purchased the Codex Sassoon 1053, the oldest near-complete Hebrew Bible, on behalf of the American Friends of ANU as a gift to the ANU - Museum of the Jewish People in Tel Aviv.

Moses has described himself as an "observant, non-believing Jewish universalist"; he keeps a kosher home and observes Shabbat.

== Personal life ==
Moses's daughter, Jennifer Anne Moses, is a writer and painter.

Diplomatic posts
Preceded by John R. Davis, Jr.	United States Ambassador to Romania; 1994–1997	Succeeded by James Rosapepe
