= John R. Davis Jr. =

American diplomat and ambassador

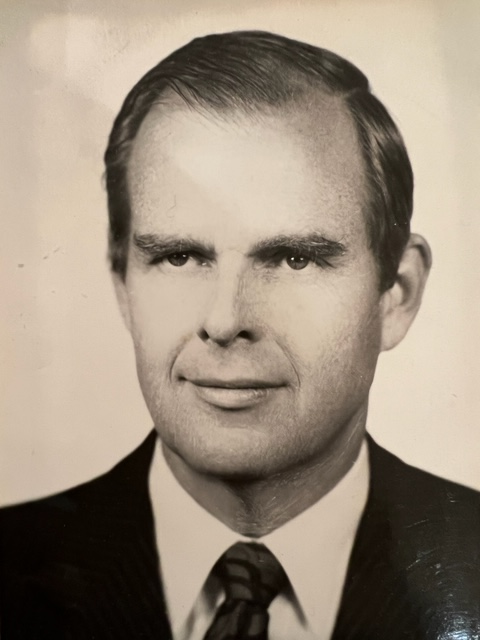

9th United States Ambassador to Romania
- In office March 11, 1992 – August 9, 1994
- President: George H. W. Bush; Bill Clinton
- Preceded by: Alan Green, Jr.
- Succeeded by: Alfred H. Moses

17th United States Ambassador to Poland
- In office March 17, 1988 – July 20, 1990
- President: Ronald Reagan; George H. W. Bush
- Preceded by: Francis J. Meehan (1983)
- Succeeded by: Thomas W. Simons Jr.
- In office September 1983 – March 17, 1988; Acting
- President: Ronald Reagan
- Preceded by: Herbert E. Wilgis Jr. (acting)
- Succeeded by: Himself as Ambassador

Personal details
- Born: John Roger Davis Jr. July 25, 1927 (age 99) Eau Claire, Wisconsin, U.S.
- Spouse: Helen Carey Davis
- Children: 3
- Education: University of California, Los Angeles (BA); Harvard University (MPA)
- Profession: Diplomat
- Awards: Distinguished Honor Award

Military service
- Allegiance: United States
- Branch/service: United States Navy
- Years of service: 1945–46
- Battles/wars: World War II

John Roger Davis Jr. (born July 25, 1927) is an American retired diplomat. From 1988 to 1990, he served as the United States Ambassador to Poland, where he helped guide Solidarity, and Poland, in its quest for free elections. Later, from 1992 to 1994, he served as the United States Ambassador to Romania.

Former Director of National Intelligence Dan Coats named Davis as the fourth person – after Lech Wałęsa, Mikhail Gorbachev and Pope John Paul II – who had "the most critical role in bringing about the collapse of communism in Eastern Europe".

== Early life and education ==
John Roger Davis Jr. was born on July 25, 1927, in Eau Claire, Wisconsin.

In 1938, he moved with his family to California so that his father, John R. Davis, and uncle, David R. Davis, could go into business together.

David R. Davis, was an aviation pioneer, who helped found the company that later became the Douglas Aircraft Company. In 1920, David R. Davis formed the Davis-Douglas Company with Donald Douglas to build airplanes, advancing Douglas $40,000 to build the Cloudster, which was the first aircraft to take off with a payload and fuel supply heavier than its own weight. A few years later, David R. Davis sold out to Douglas for a $2500 promissory note. The firm became Douglas Aircraft Company, later McDonnell Douglas. David R. Davis went on to invent the Davis wing – a better airfoil that provided far greater lift per square foot of wing area than any other design. It was patented in the 1930s and was a major component of the B-24 Liberator bombers in World War 2.

While living in California, John R. Davis Jr. attended The Webb Schools starting in 1943, and graduated in 1945. He then enlisted in the United States Navy, where he served during World War II. He graduated from the University of California, Los Angeles, where he received his bachelor of arts in political science in 1953. He later received a master's degree from Harvard University in 1965.

== Foreign Service ==
Davis was appointed a United States Foreign Service officer in 1955.

He got married just before arriving at his first posting in Jakarta. Over the years, he would be posted in Poland multiple times, as well as Milan, Rome, and Sydney. In 1982, he visited China with John H. Holdridge.

=== Poland ===
Davis was first posted to Poland from 1960 to 1963, before returning again from 1973 to 1976 as deputy chief of mission. During these trips, his children became fluent in Polish, and Davis became well known.

==== Chargé d'affaires ====
John Roger Davis Jr. was the director of Eastern European affairs at the US State Department when Polish General Wojciech Jaruzelski declared martial law on December 13, 1981. Solidarity was suspended and then officially banned in October 1982 and many people were arrested.

With the departure of Ambassador Francis J. Meehan during the imposition of martial law in Poland and the subsequent Polish refusal to accept his announced successor, the United States lacked a permanent representative in Poland. Relations between Poland and the United States were at an all-time low when Davis was sent by President Reagan as the United States chargé d'affaires, beginning in September 1983.

In October 1983, Lech Wałęsa won the Nobel Peace Prize. Wałęsa, fearful that if he left Poland the authorities would not let him return, sent his wife Danuta to accept the prize on his behalf. Davis went to Gdańsk to deliver President Reagan’s congratulations to Mr. Wałęsa, joining Wałęsa and a dozen of his supporters in the study of the rectory of St. Brigid’s church, where they listened to the radio broadcast from Oslo.

On October 20, 1984, Father Jerzy Popiełuszko, a Solidarity supporter who was known for his outspoken sermons, was assassinated by Polish secret police. His funeral was held on November 3, 1984. Senator Kennedy attempted to attend but the Polish government would not give him a visa. Davis was the only foreign diplomat at the funeral. The crowd numbered close to a half million people.

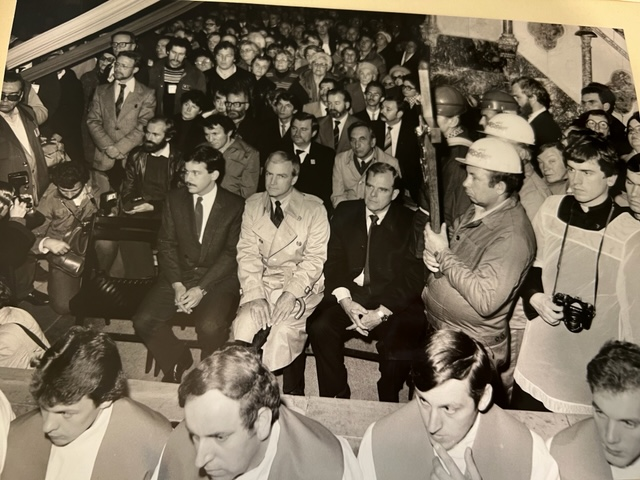
John R Davis Jr. at memorial mass on first anniversary of Father Popieluszko's death, October 1985. Lech Wałęsa and Tadeusz Mazowiecki in row behind him.

During these years Davis worked behind the scenes to help get Solidarity members out of jail. The U.S. Government was very reluctant to appear conciliatory towards Poland and was watching in particular the fate of "the eleven", top Solidarity leaders who had been in prison for two years and who were still awaiting trial.

In 1986, after the Chernobyl nuclear power plant disaster, Davis decided not to evacuate the US Embassy in Warsaw after talking to the EPA and having them send a team to Warsaw with Geiger counters and advice on how to deal with the events. He cooperated closely with Professor Zbigniew Jaworski of the Central Lab for Radiological Protection during this period, and arranged an international deal for shipment by air of large quantities of powdered milk for Polish children to replenish strategic reserves which were rapidly being depleted. Diplomats at the US Embassy stopped eating local spinach, mushrooms and venison for a while during this period.

From 1986 to 1989, one third of the US House of Representative and 2/3 of the Senate came to Poland.

In January 1987, Deputy Secretary of State John C. Whitehead came to Poland. It was the first high level contact between the two governments since martial law. Davis invited Wałęsa and Solidarity leaders Adam Michnik, Jacek Kuroń and Janusz Onyszkiewicz for dinner with Whitehead.

After Whitehead’s visit, Davis started holding regular dinners for government officials, followed by separate dinners for Solidarity members, eventually mixing the two groups of people. Davis liked to confuse the militia by having people arrive by streetcar rather than in cars whose license plates could be noted down by the militia who had a box across the street from the Ambassador’s residence.

In February, 1987, the US government lifted sanctions it had imposed on the Polish government after it had crushed the Solidarity union.

Vice President Bush visited Poland on September 26, 1987, the day the official exchange of ambassadors was agreed upon. It was the first high-level visit since President Carter had come to Poland in 1977. Vice President Bush met with General Jaruzelski, who referred to Solidarity as “just a bunch of people that Davis is always inviting for dinner!”. The Bush visit did not prompt the Polish government to lift the ban on Solidarity, but they did agree to Davis as the US ambassador.

As chargé, Davis shepherded the movement toward democracy along: hosting leaders of Solidarity in his residence, dealing with matters regarding economic sanctions relief, meeting with Lech Wałęsa after the latter won the Nobel Peace Prize that year, and fostering bilateral cooperation in exchange for amnesty of dissidents.

==== Ambassador ====
In October 1987, President Reagan nominated Davis to permanently hold the position of United States Ambassador to Poland. The 100th United States Congress accepted his nomination in February of the next year, and on March 18, Davis presented his diplomatic credentials, thus becoming the first permanent ambassador in five years. As ambassador, Davis continued his work with the democracy movement, cultivating a deeper relationship with Wałęsa, helping bring Polish Round Table Agreement participants together, and increasing economic ties to the United States.

The Roundtable talks began on February 6, 1989. The talks led to a landmark power-sharing agreement negotiated by representatives of the communist Polish government, leaders of Solidarity, and leaders of the Catholic Church that allowed for the first free elections in Eastern Europe in nearly 50 years. Recently declassified State Department documents detail Ambassador Davis’ analysis and participation in the historic events during Poland’s revolution.

During the lead up to the Roundtable talks and afterwards, Davis and his embassy staff kept the President well informed, having nurtured ties both with their communist government counterparts and Solidarity leadership. The depth of this understanding is evidence from the cables sent in 1989 and Davis’ analysis following the signing of the Round Table agreements. The embassy understood what the Round Table agreements and impending free elections meant: an overwhelming victory for Solidarity. As Davis wrote on April 19, 1989, “(The communist authorities) are more likely to meet total defeat and great embarrassment”. Davis sent back word to Washington that Solidarity would win, and win big. While few others were openly predicting a “Solidarity sweep in the Senate”, Davis clearly saw that June 4 (election day) would be nothing but an outright victory for Solidarity. In retrospect, the US embassy’ analysis of events in this instance was dead on.

Following Solidarity’s overwhelming victory in the elections, Davis quickly became concerned that catastrophe loomed on the horizon and that a crisis might ensue over the election of a new Polish president. Because the election of Jaruzelski as president was an unwritten assumption of the Round Table agreements, the embassy, Washington, and many Solidarity activists correctly felt that if Solidarity reneged on this part of the deal, the whole framework of the agreement might fall apart. It now became imperative to insure that General Jaruzelski be elected president. In a stunning shift of policy, the Americans were now campaigning for the communist incumbent.

In this increasingly tense situation, Ambassador Davis met over dinner on June 22, 1989, with “some leading Solidarity legislators, who had better remain nameless”. According to a secret cable sent the following day most Solidarity leaders felt that “If Jaruzelski is not elected president, there is a genuine danger of civil war ending …with a reluctant but brutal Soviet intervention”. However, most Solidarity leaders had also pledged publicly not to vote for Jaruzelski, so they found themselves in a jam and came to Ambassador Davis looking for advice. Davis jotted down a few numbers on the back of an embassy matchbook to explain the “arcane western political practice known as head-counting” whereby a large number of Solidarity delegates might not attend the election session. The Solidarity delegates in attendance could then abstain from voting because the party delegates would have such an overwhelming victory. Davis was now actively advising Solidarity on how to elect General Jaruzelski.

By the end of June 1989, with President Bush’s visit rapidly approaching, the newly elected government had not yet settled the presidential crisis. In fact, General Jaruzelski began to show signs that he was not willing to run for election, further endangering the precarious balance.

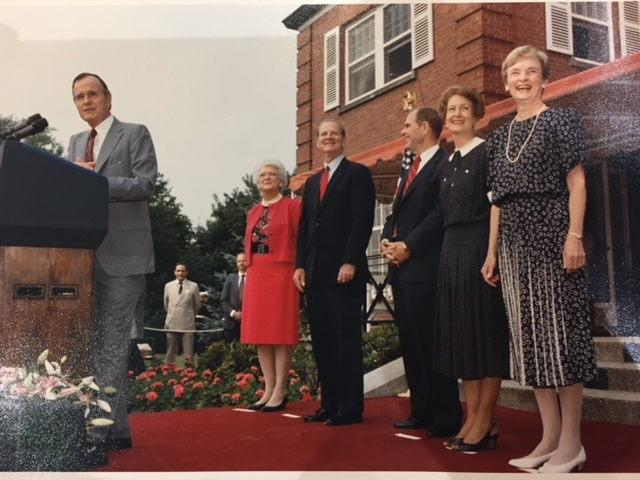
President George H.W. Bush, Secretary of State James Baker, Ambassador John R. Davis Jr. and Helen Davis at the Ambassador's residence, Warsaw, Poland for July 1989 historic luncheon.

On the evening of July 9, 1989, President Bush landed in Warsaw for a two-day visit which included private meetings with General Jaruzelski and Lech Wałęsa, a reception at Ambassador Davis’ residence, and the historic opportunity to speak before the Polish parliament. During the meetings with Jaruzelski, Bush pushed him to run for President. 40 Communist, Solidarity and Catholic leaders and 26 Americans were invited to a luncheon at the US ambassador’s residence. Deputy Bronisław Geremek, who headed the Solidarity caucus, recalled it was only 2 years ago that the Bush’s had talked with members of Solidarity “right in this house, and even though at that time we heard words of hope, I believe that none of us at that time expected that we would meet in 2 years in a situation like the present” It was a historic occasion, where “jailers and jailed” ate at the same table. A week after President Bush departed for Hungary, General Jaruzelski narrowly became president by one vote.

Secretary of State James Baker praised Davis on July 2, 1989 for his coordination and communication with the federal government over the democratization of Poland.

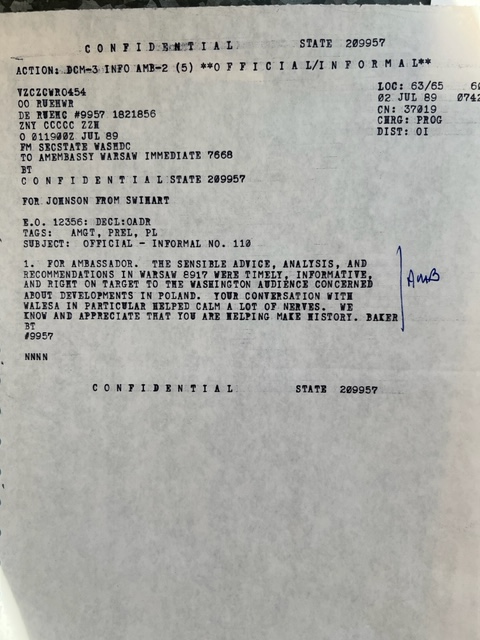
Cable from Secretary of State James Baker to Ambassador John R. Davis, Jr. July 2, 1989

On August 24, Solidarity leader Tadeusz Mazowiecki became prime minister and was charged to create a new government, ending communist rule and preceding the Revolutions of 1989.

Davis contended that Solidarity leaders should be given credit for collapsing the whole of the communist system. “We spent $4 trillion fighting the Cold War and we looked up one day and the war was won by a small group of people in Poland without firing a shot” he said.

Davis was given orders from Deputy Secretary of State Lawrence Eagleburger to promote the economic growth of Poland.

In November 1989, Lech Wałęsa was invited to address a joint session of Congress. During the following senate luncheon in his honor, he thanked Davis directly, stating he was “our Ambassador – well, perhaps I should say YOUR ambassador, because I speak of John Davis, but we think of him as ours”.

Davis ended his service in Poland in July 1990, succeeded by Thomas W. Simons Jr. Davis received the Distinguished Honor Award, the highest award the State Department confers.

In November 2019, former Director of National Intelligence Dan Coats said that “after Wałęsa, Gorbachev and John Paul II, the fourth person with the most critical role in bringing about the collapse of communism in Eastern Europe” is John Roger Davis Jr. Coats said “Ambassador Davis was a key participant in all of the events and much of the decision-making in Poland that led to the communist party retiring its flags and turning the central committee building into Poland’s first stock exchange. With his critical help, an entrenched power elite – with all the means of coercion at its disposal and the Red Army at its back – voluntarily and without violence relinquished power to democratic forces through peaceful negotiation. It was the first time such a thing had occurred in all of human history.

Upon his return to the United States, Davis took a year off to be a diplomat in residence at Yale University.

=== Romania ===
In May 1990, George H. W. Bush appointed Davis as the United States Ambassador to Romania. Davis presented his credentials on March 11, 1992 before leaving in August 1994.

During his time as ambassador, he had security concerns regarding Harold James Nicholson, who was later convicted for spying for Russia.

== Personal life ==
Davis married Helen Marie Carey in 1956. They have three children: Thorp J. Davis, Katherine Davis, and Anne Davis. Davis speaks Polish and Italian.

Diplomatic posts
Preceded by Francis J. Meehan	United States Ambassador to Poland; Acting; 1983 - 1988	Succeeded by Himself
Preceded by Himself; Acting	United States Ambassador to Poland; 1988 - 1990	Succeeded by Thomas W. Simons Jr.
Preceded by Alan Green, Jr.	United States Ambassador to Romania; 1992 - 1994	Succeeded by Alfred H. Moses
