= Kathleen A. Kavalec =

American diplomat

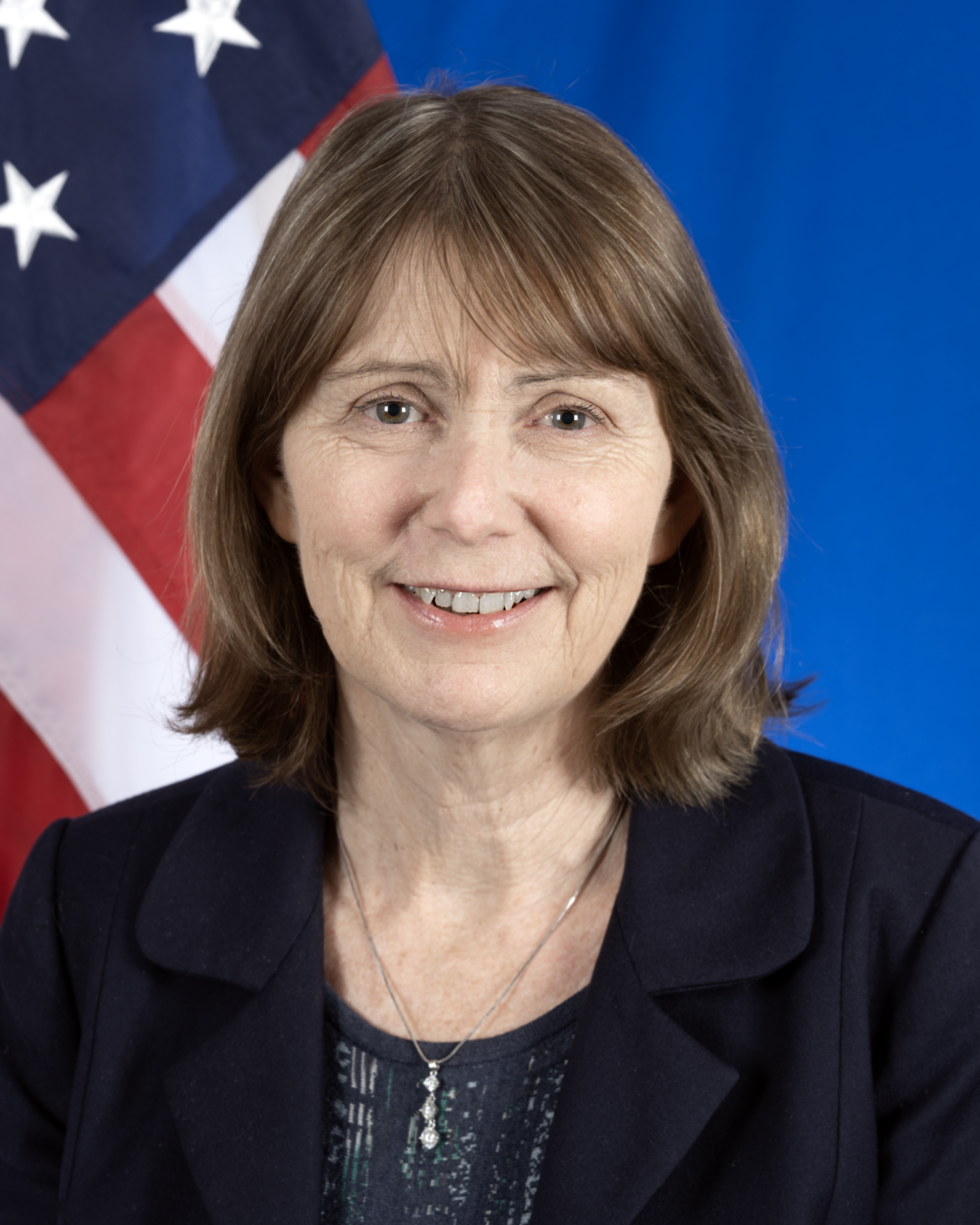

United States Ambassador to Romania
- In office February 14, 2023 – May 20, 2025
- President: Joe Biden; Donald Trump
- Preceded by: Adrian Zuckerman
- Succeeded by: Darryl Nirenberg

Personal details
- Born: California, U.S.
- Education: University of California at Berkeley (BA); Georgetown University (MS)
- Awards: Order of the Star of Romania, Grand Cross rank
- Kathleen A. Kavalec's voice Kavalec's opening statement at her confirmation hearing to be United States ambassador to Romania; Recorded November 29, 2022

Kathleen Ann Kavalec is an American diplomat who served as the United States ambassador to Romania from February 2023 to May 2025. She is a former nominee to be the United States ambassador to Albania under President Donald Trump.

== Early life and education ==
Kavalec earned her bachelor of arts in political science from the University of California at Berkeley and a master of science in foreign service from Georgetown University.

== Career ==
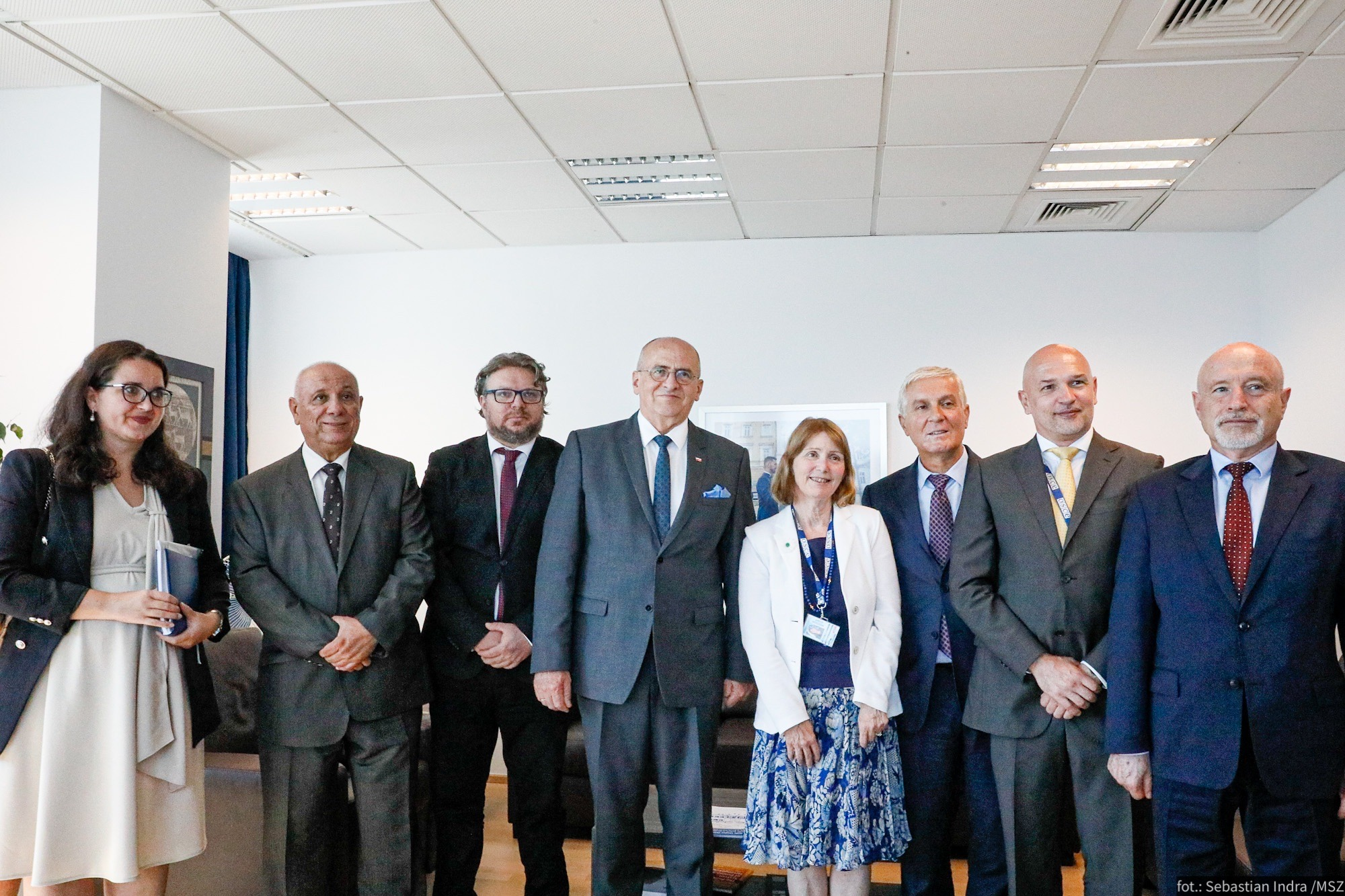
Kathleen Kavalec (center)

Kavalec is a career member of the Senior Foreign Service, with the rank of minister-counselor. She has served as the head of mission at the Organization for Security and Co-operation in Europe (OSCE) Mission to Bosnia and Herzegovina since 2019. Previously, she served as deputy assistant secretary in the Bureau of European and Eurasian Affairs. Kavalec also served as the director of the Office of Russian Affairs and the deputy chief of mission of the U.S. mission UNESCO in Paris, France. Kavalec was responsible for overseeing major U.S. foreign assistance programs as deputy coordinator for assistance in the European Bureau, and as director for conflict prevention in the Office of the Coordinator for Reconstruction and Stabilization. Kavalec has served in Bucharest, Romania, Kyiv, Ukraine and Moscow, Russia. Domestically, she served as a legislative management officer in the Bureau of Legislative Affairs and has also served as director of the economic unit in the office of the coordinator for assistance for the New Independent States.

=== Nomination as United States ambassador to Albania ===
On July 3, 2018, President Donald Trump nominated Kavalec to be the next United States ambassador to Albania. Her nomination expired at the end of the year and was ultimately returned to Trump.

=== United States ambassador to Romania ===
On June 3, 2022, President Joe Biden nominated Kavalec to be the United States ambassador to Romania. Hearings on her nomination were held before the Senate Foreign Relations Committee on November 29, 2022. The committee favorably reported the nomination on December 7, 2022. On December 15, 2022, her nomination was confirmed by in the Senate by voice vote. She was sworn in on December 20, 2022, and presented her credentials to President Klaus Iohannis on February 14, 2023.

=== "Satanic baby art" hoax ===
In 2025, Florida Representative Anna Paulina Luna complained that she had seen "satanic baby art" at the Ambassador's residence in Bucharest to Erin Scavino, who runs the State Department Art in Embassies Program under the Trump administration. The work was Faun in the Big City (2014) by Einar and Jamex de la Torre, an LED lightbox with a horned head in the center, invoking Christian and Mexican traditional iconography and placed in the residence by the Art in Embassies Program. Scavino had the art removed and later implied on the podcast The Katie Miller Show that she had the ambassador removed from her position as well.

== Awards and recognitions ==
Kavalec has won numerous State Department awards, as well as the Presidential Rank Award. On November 29, 2024, President Iohannis awarded her the Order of the Star of Romania, in the rank of Grand Cross.

== Personal life ==
Kavalec is a native of California. She speaks Romanian, Spanish, Portuguese, French, and Russian.

Diplomatic posts
Preceded by David Muniz; Chargé d'Affaires	United States Ambassador to Romania; 2023–2025	Succeeded by Darryl Nirenberg
