= C. Kevin Blackstone =

American diplomat

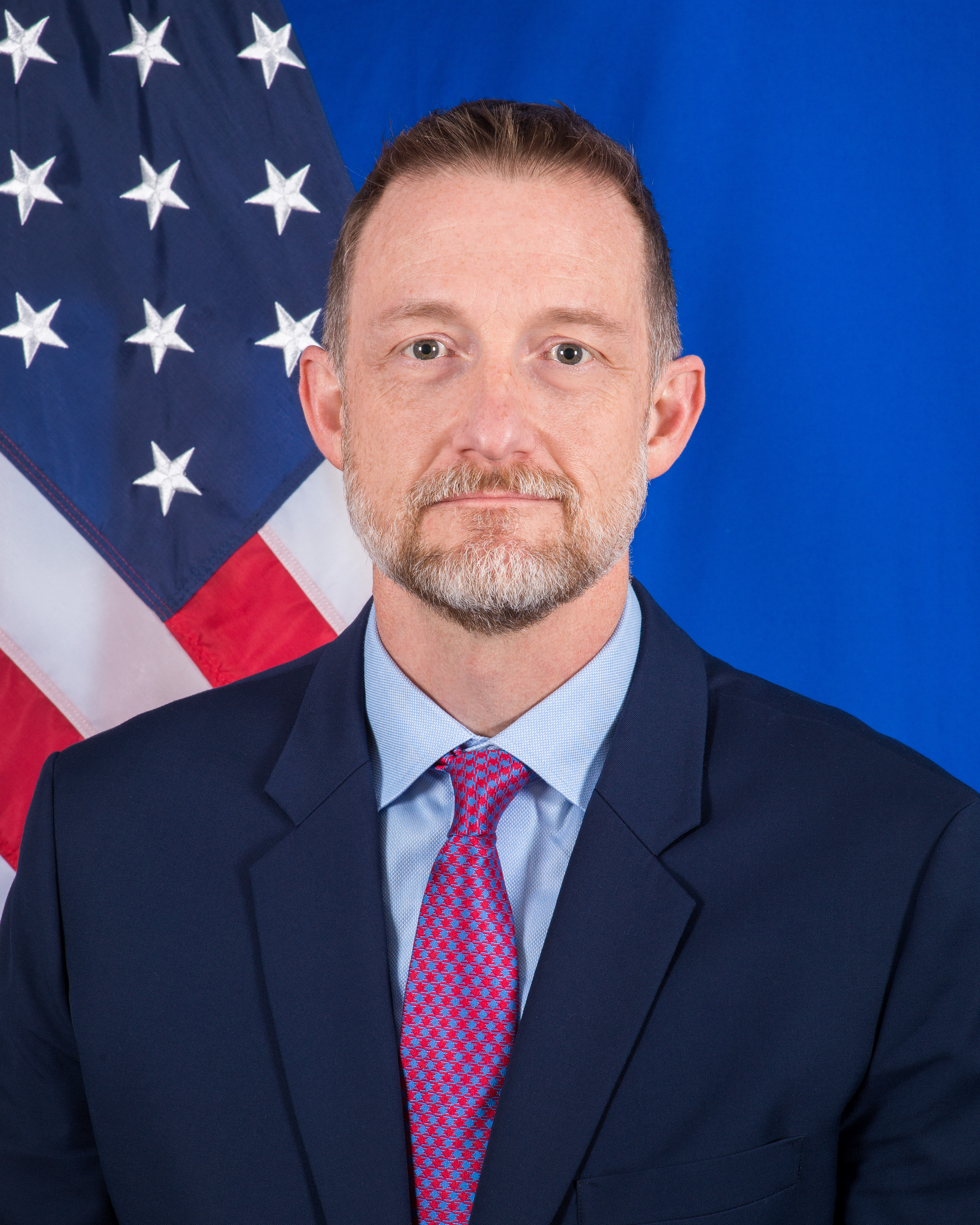

United States Ambassador to East Timor
- In office March 19, 2021 – August 2, 2021
- President: Joe Biden
- Preceded by: Kathleen M. Fitzpatrick
- Succeeded by: Donna Ann Welton

Personal details
- Born: Charles Kevin Blackstone
- Education: University of Virginia (BA); Maxwell School of Citizenship and Public Affairs (MPA)

Charles Kevin Blackstone is an American diplomat who served as the United States Ambassador to East Timor from March to August 2021. He previously served as the executive director of the Bureau of East Asian and Pacific Affairs from 2017 to 2020.

== Early life and education ==
Blackstone earned his Bachelor of Arts from the University of Virginia and his Master of Public Administration from the Maxwell School of Citizenship and Public Affairs at Syracuse University.

== Career ==
Blackstone, a career member of the Senior Foreign Service, class of minister-counselor, has been a career member of the Foreign Service since 1991. He was the minister-counselor for management of the United States Embassy in Cairo, Egypt, and management counselor of the United States embassies in Bangkok, Thailand and New Delhi, India. From 2009 to 2010, he was also the team leader of the United States Provincial Reconstruction Team in Wasit, Iraq. He served as the executive director of the Bureau of East Asian and Pacific Affairs at the State Department from 2017 to 2020.

=== Ambassador to East Timor ===
On May 28, 2020, President Trump nominated Blackstone to be the next ambassador to Timor-Leste. On June 2, 2020, his nomination was sent to the Senate. He appeared before the Senate Foreign Relations Committee on December 2, 2020. Blackstone was confirmed by voice vote by the full Senate on December 22, 2020. He was sworn in on January 6, 2021. He presented credentials to Timor-Leste President Francisco Guterres on March 19, 2021.

Blackstone left the ambassadorship in August 2021.

== Awards and recognitions ==
Blackstone is the recipient of numerous State Department awards, including the Expeditionary Service Award.

== Personal life ==
Blackstone and his wife, Alexandra, have an adult son and daughter. He speaks French and Italian.

Diplomatic posts
Preceded by Kathleen M. Fitzpatrick	United States Ambassador to East Timor; 2021	Succeeded by Thomas Daley (Chargé d’Affaires ad interim)
