= Hans G. Klemm =

American diplomat (born 1957)

Hans Klemm
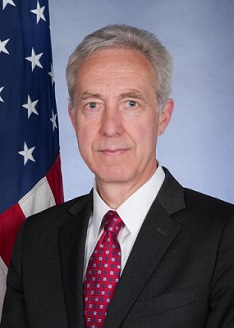

United States Ambassador to Romania
- In office September 21, 2015 – December 14, 2019
- President: Barack Obama; Donald Trump
- Preceded by: Dean Richard Thompson (acting)
- Succeeded by: Adrian Zuckerman

United States Ambassador to East Timor
- In office July 4, 2007 – February 20, 2010
- President: George W. Bush; Barack Obama
- Preceded by: Gary Gray
- Succeeded by: Judith Fergin

Personal details
- Born: Hans George Klemm; August 21, 1957 (age 69)
- Education: Indiana University Bloomington; Stanford University

Hans George Klemm (born August 21, 1957) is an American diplomat who served as the United States Ambassador to Romania from September 21, 2015, to December 2019. Previously he also served as the United States ambassador to East Timor from June 12, 2007, to May 25, 2010.

== Early life and education ==
Klemm's father emigrated to the US from Germany.

Klemm graduated from Indiana University Bloomington with a Bachelor of Arts in Economics and History, and from Stanford University with a Master of Arts in International Development Policy.

== Career ==
Klemm joined the United States Foreign Service in 1981 and was promoted into the Senior Foreign Service in 2001.

From 2012 to 2015 he was Principal Deputy Assistant Secretary in the State Department's Bureau of Human Resources. As of January 2015, Klemm served as Senior Advisor to the Under Secretary for Management at the Department of State. In March 2015 President Barack Obama announced his intent to nominate Klemm as U.S. Ambassador to Romania. In September 2015, Klemm assumed the duties of U.S. Ambassador to Romania. In 2016, Hans G. Klemm, together with other local officials, were pictured with a Székely flag during his visit to the Székely Land. The photo was posted by the mayor of Sfântu Gheorghe on Facebook. The reactions of the politicians in Bucharest were turbulent. In a response Klemm affirmed that the only two flags that are important to him, as a diplomat, are the U.S. and the Romanian ones.

== Honour ==
- (Romania) Romanian Royal Family: Knight of the Royal Decoration of Nihil Sine Deo

== See also ==
- List of ambassadors of the United States

Diplomatic posts
Preceded by Gary Gray	United States Ambassador to East Timor; 2007–2010	Succeeded by Judith Fergin
Preceded by Dean Richard Thompson; Acting	United States Ambassador to Romania; 2015–2019	Succeeded by Adrian Zuckerman
