= Alan Green Jr. =

American diplomat

United States Ambassador to Romania
- In office December 7, 1989 – January 11, 1992
- President: George H. W. Bush
- Preceded by: Roger Kirk
- Succeeded by: John R. Davis Jr.

Chair of the Federal Maritime Commission
- In office June 1981 – June 1985
- President: Ronald Reagan
- Preceded by: Edward V. Hickey Jr
- Succeeded by: Leslie Lazar Kanuk

Personal details
- Born: May 1, 1925 Portland, Oregon, U.S.
- Died: March 23, 2001 (aged 75) Palm Springs, California, U.S.
- Cause of death: Heart failure
- Party: Republican
- Education: Stanford University
- Occupation: Businessman

Alan "Punch" Green Jr. (May 1, 1925 – March 23, 2001) was the United States Ambassador to Romania from 1989 to 1992. Green's service began just before the overthrow and execution of Romanian dictator Nicolae Ceaușescu. He evacuated women and children from the grounds and slept on his office couch for ten days due to explosions around Bucharest., In May 1990, he was recalled “to Washington for 'consultations.' A State Department spokeswoman described the action as a 'public signal of our concern for the process of free and fair elections.'”

== Business careers ==
Green was chairman of the board and owner of Tom Benson Glass Co. He went on to own Western Batteries Inc. of Beaverton, Oregon. Green was a recovering alcoholic and was one of the founders of Comprehensive Care Corp., which provided treatment for alcoholism.

== Political career ==
Green chaired the campaigns for former Oregon Governors Victor Atiyeh and Tom McCall and headed the Oregon campaign committees of presidents Gerald Ford, Ronald Reagan and George H. W. Bush.

After serving two terms as chairman of the Port of Portland, Ronald Reagan appointed him chairman of the Federal Maritime Commission in 1981. Green “rated guiding the Shipping Act of 1984 through Congress as one of his proudest achievements” of his four year tenure.

== Personal life ==
Green was valedictorian of his class at Lincoln High School (Portland, Oregon) and served in the U.S. Army in the Pacific during World War II before graduating from Stanford University in 1949. At Stanford he was known as Mr. Republican.

Green died at his home from heart failure.

Diplomatic posts
Preceded by Roger Kirk	United States Ambassador to Romania; 1989-1992	Succeeded by John Roger Davis Jr.
