= Darryl Nirenberg =

American diplomat (born 1959)

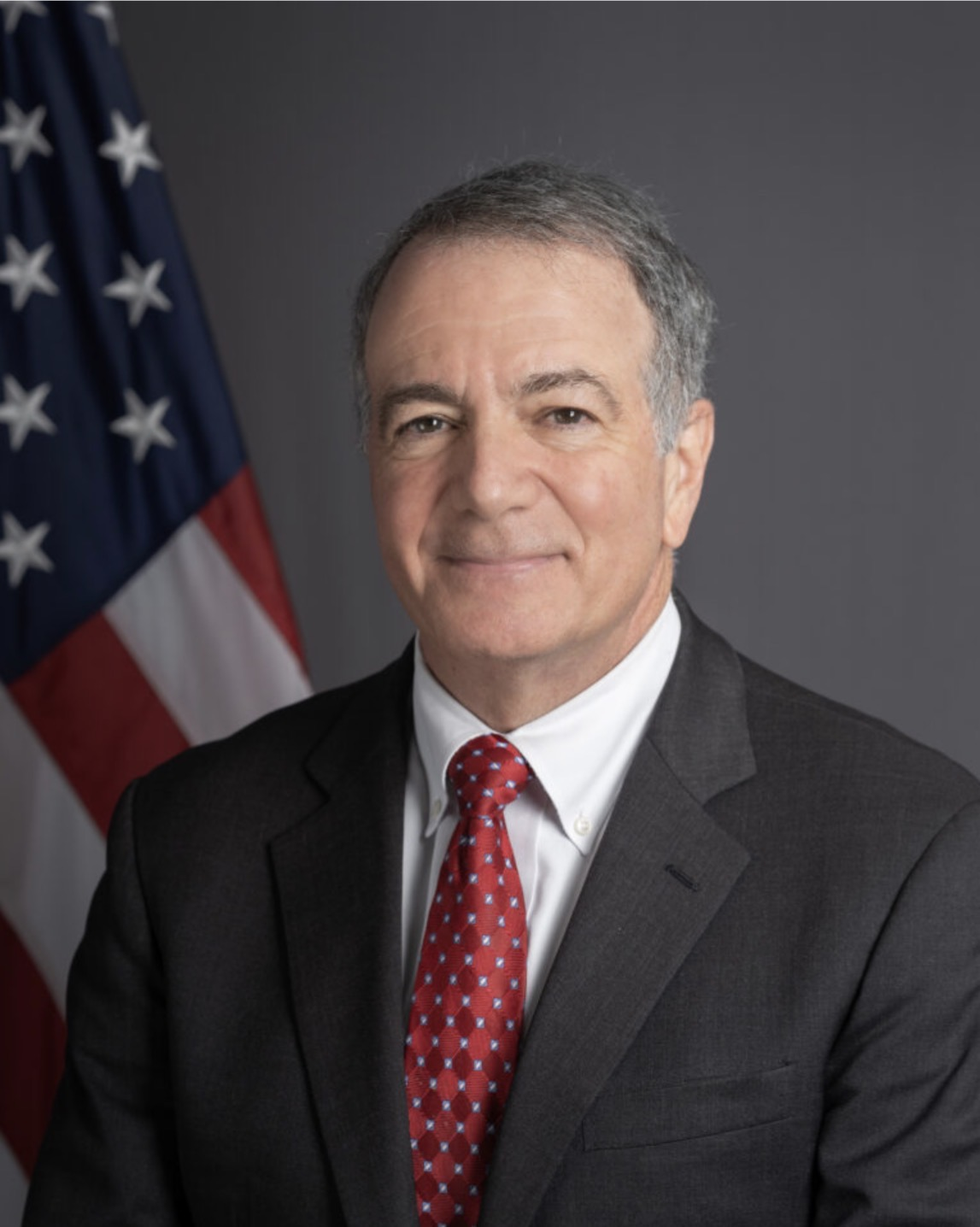
- Official portrait, 2026

United States Ambassador to Romania
- Incumbent
- Assumed office March 3, 2026
- President: Donald Trump
- Preceded by: Kathleen A. Kavalec

Personal details
- Born: Darryl D. Nirenberg; September 23, 1959 (age 67) Ellenville, New York, U.S.
- Party: Republican
- Spouse: Lori
- Relations: Chic Hecht (father-in-law)
- Children: 2
- Education: Colgate University (BA); George Washington University (JD)

Darryl D. Nirenberg (born September 23, 1959) is an American attorney, lobbyist, and diplomat who has served as the United States ambassador to Romania since 2026. Before assuming office, Nirenberg worked for the law firms Patton Boggs and Steptoe LLP.

== Early life and education ==
Darryl D. Nirenberg was born on September 23, 1959, in Ellenville, New York. His family emigrated to the United States from Eastern Europe. Nirenberg graduated cum laude from Colgate University in 1981, and attained a Juris Doctor from George Washington University Law School in 1987.

== Career ==
Nirenberg worked as a legislative aide to Republican senator S. I. Hayakawa of California from 1981 to 1982. He went on to become a professional staff member of the Senate Agriculture Committee, and later joined the Senate Foreign Relations Committee staff, where he served as professional staff member, minority counsel, and minority deputy staff director.

Nirenberg served as both chief of staff and legislative director to Republican senator Jesse Helms of North Carolina, before entering private practice, where he worked as an attorney for over four decades, specializing in foreign policy and international trade law. He worked for Patton Boggs from 1995 to 2014, before taking a position at Steptoe LLP, where he worked until 2026. In 2019, The Hill labelled Nirenberg one of Washington, D.C.'s top lobbyists.

In 2021, Nirenberg unsuccessfully ran for city council in Alexandria, Virginia, as a Republican. He received 8.69% of the total vote, or 19,484 votes.

=== United States ambassador to Romania ===
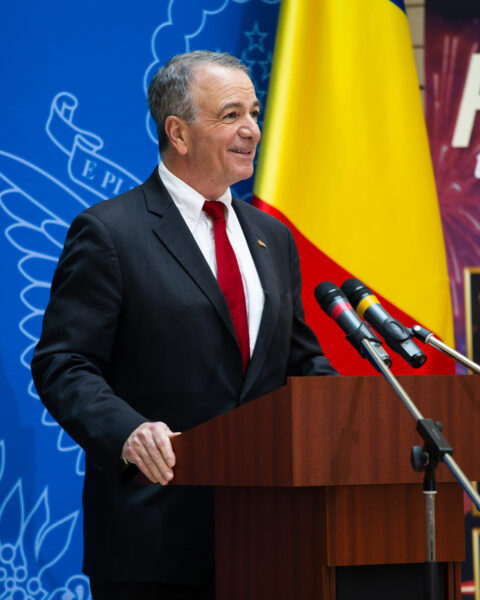
Nirenberg speaking at the National Library of Romania in March 2026

On May 21, 2025, President Donald Trump nominated Nirenberg to become United States ambassador to Romania. He was confirmed by the United States Senate in a 53–43 vote on December 18, 2025, and was sworn in by Michael J. Rigas, the United States deputy secretary of state for management and resources, on February 18, 2026.

Nirenberg presented his diplomatic credentials to Romanian president Nicușor Dan on March 3, 2026, formally marking the beginning of his tenure.

== Personal life ==
Nirenberg is married to Lori Hecht Nirenberg, the daughter of Chic Hecht, a former U.S. senator from Nevada and U.S. ambassador to the Bahamas. He has two children.

Before becoming ambassador, Nirenberg and his family lived in the Washington metropolitan area, where he coached youth baseball and soccer. He is Jewish.

Diplomatic posts
Preceded by Michael Dickerson; Chargé d'Affaires	United States Ambassador to Romania; 2026–present	Incumbent
