= Adrian Zuckerman (attorney) =

American lawyer and diplomat (born 1956)

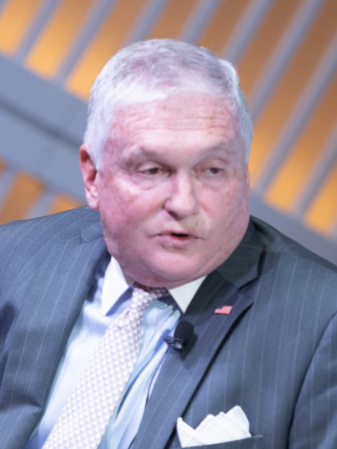
- Zuckerman in 2025

US Ambassador to Romania
- In office December 17, 2019 – January 20, 2021
- President: Donald Trump
- Preceded by: Hans G. Klemm
- Succeeded by: Kathleen A. Kavalec

Personal details
- Born: September 22, 1956 (age 70) Bucharest, Romania

Adrian Zuckerman (born September 22, 1956) is a Romanian-born American lawyer and former diplomat who served as the United States Ambassador to Romania from 2019 to 2021.

== Early life and education ==
Zuckerman was born in Bucharest, in the Romanian People's Republic, and is still fluent in Romanian. His parents were Romanian Jews who worked as medical researchers. The family emigrated from Romania when he was nine years old, spending nine months in Rome, Italy before arriving in New Haven, Connecticut in May 1966, when his father started work at the Yale School of Medicine.

Zuckerman graduated from Hamden Hall Country Day School in 1975. He earned a B.S in Life Sciences from the Massachusetts Institute of Technology, a B.S in Management from the MIT Sloan School of Management and his J.D. from New York Law School in June 1983. While at MIT, Zuckerman became a brother of the Lambda Phi Chapter of the Alpha Delta Phi fraternity.

== Career ==
Zuckerman was a real estate lawyer and partner with the New York City law firm Seyfarth Shaw.

Before his tenure at Seyfarth Shaw, Zuckerman was co-head of national real estate and corporate services at Epstein Becker & Green.

Between 2003 and 2007, Zuckerman was Partner, Head of Real Estate, Managing Partner of New York Office and Member of Management Committee at Lowenstein Sandler. Prior to this (1994-2003), he was Partner, Head of Real Estate and Member of Management Committee at Davidoff & Malito, LLP in New York City. He served as counsel at a major national real estate firm in New York City (1987 to 1994) and prior to that as a law firm associate (1984 to 1987).

He also has acted as the chair of a New York City civil court judicial screening panel and as an arbitrator for the Real Estate Board of New York.

Active in philanthropic and educational initiatives, Mr. Zuckerman is a member of the board of Kids Corp., a non-profit organization that supports underprivileged children in Newark, New Jersey, and serves on the alumni board of New York Law School.

He is currently Of Counsel to DLA Piper.

=== United States Ambassador to Romania ===
On July 24, 2018, President Donald Trump announced his intent to nominate Zuckerman to be the next United States Ambassador to Romania. On November 19, 2019, his nomination was confirmed by a vote of 65–30 in the Senate. On December 17, 2019, he presented his credentials to Romanian President Klaus Iohannis. He resigned on January 20, 2021.

Ambassador Zuckerman focused on a number of issues during this mandate, including fighting corruption, combating human trafficking, strengthening the rule of law and increasing reforms of state-owned businesses.

During Zuckerman's tenure in Romania, the two countries signed a 10-year “Roadmap for Defense Cooperation.

Another major project during Ambassador Zuckerman's term was the signing of an agreement to finance and refurbish one nuclear reactor and build two more nuclear reactors at Cernavoda. This $8 billion project, which is financed with up to $7 billion by the United States Export Import Bank, is the largest project ever between the two countries.

== Honours ==
- Romania: Ambassador Zuckerman is a recipient of the Grand Cross rank of the Order of the Star of Romania. This Order is Romania's highest civil Order and was presented to Zuckerman by the President of Romania, Klaus Iohannis in January 2021, as a sign of the “high appreciation for the entire activity carried out during his term in Romania, as well as for his substantial involvement in the development and deepening of the strategic partnership between Romania and the United States of America”.

== Zuckerman's connections with Donald Trump and Rudy Giuliani ==
During his confirmation hearings in June 2019, Zuckerman testified, “If confirmed, I would offer continued support for Romania’s noteworthy anti-corruption efforts. Fighting corruption and supporting judicial independence are vital to the region’s long-term prosperity and security, as well as to the extraordinary law enforcement and security cooperation that exists between the United States and Romania.”

Zuckerman has had financial and political ties to prominent Republican figures. In 2007, when Rudy Giuliani was seeking the Republican nomination for president, Zuckerman donated $2,300 to his campaign.

In August 2018, Giuliani wrote a letter to Romania's president claiming that Romania’s National Anticorruption Directorate had "crossed the line of acceptable behavior" and requested amnesty for individuals prosecuted for corruption. Giuliani sent the letter at the request of former FBI Director Louis Freeh, as part of a private lobbying engagement through Freeh Group, and was later criticized for contradicting official U.S. State Department policy, which had recently praised Romania's anti-corruption progress. This position was not shared by the U.S. government, nor by Ambassador Zuckerman.

In contrast, Ambassador Zuckerman consistently supported Romania’s anti-corruption initiatives and the rule of law. For example, in an October 2020 speech, he stated: "The rule of law is paramount to freedom and democracy. We cannot backslide on the advances made in Romania to restore respect for the rule of law in the last year. The corruption found in the prior government, which resulted in the relaxation of anti-crime laws just to help former PSD leader Dragnea avoid jail will not be countenanced. Those who participated and assisted in depriving the Romanian people of the rule of law and engaged in corrupt conduct will not have our support."

Zuckerman is also known to be a member of one of Donald Trump’s private golf clubs, a connection shared by several Trump-era ambassadorial appointees.

== Controversies ==
In 2022, Romanian film producer and businessman Bobby Păunescu presented Mr Zuckerman as the international legal representative to a new real estate development in Cluj, which was never completed. He later denied any involvement with the project.

In November 2024, Elena Lasconi, leader of USR party and candidate in the upcoming presidential elections, accused Zuckerman of pressure to withdraw her campaign in favour of her opponent, Nicolae Ciucă. Zukerman denied the allegations.

Diplomatic posts
Preceded by Hans G. Klemm	United States Ambassador to Romania; 2019–2021	Succeeded by David Muniz; Chargé d'Affaires
