= Kathleen M. Fitzpatrick =

American diplomat

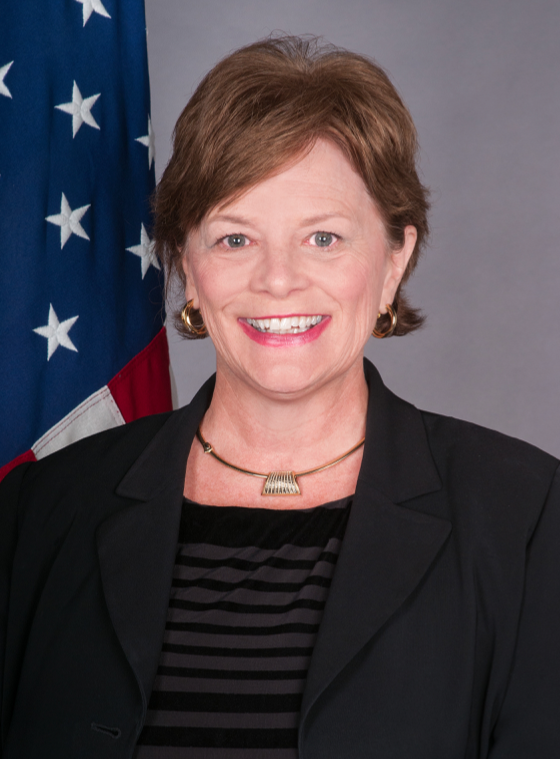

United States Ambassador to East Timor
- In office January 19, 2018 – November 18, 2020
- President: Donald Trump
- Preceded by: Karen Clark Stanton
- Succeeded by: C. Kevin Blackstone

Personal details
- Born: Hyattsville, Maryland, U.S.
- Education: University of Dayton; Georgetown University; National War College

Kathleen M. Fitzpatrick is an American diplomat and career member of the Senior Foreign Service who served as the United States Ambassador to East Timor from 2018 to 2020. She has served as a diplomat since 1983. Fitzpatrick is the former Principal Deputy Assistant Secretary in the Bureau of Intelligence and Research at the United States Department of State. She was nominated to be the United States Ambassador to East Timor on July 25, 2017. She was confirmed by the Senate on November 2, 2017. She was sworn in on December 22, 2017. She left her mission on November 18, 2020.

== Personal life ==
Fitzpatrick speaks Spanish, French, Russian, Dutch and Arabic.

Diplomatic posts
Preceded by Karen Clark Stanton	United States Ambassador to East Timor; 2018–2020	Succeeded by C. Kevin Blackstone
