= Orison Rudolph Aggrey =

American diplomat (1926–2016)

O. Rudolph Aggrey

United States Ambassador to Romania
- In office November 22, 1977 – July 11, 1981
- President: Jimmy Carter; Ronald Reagan
- Preceded by: Harry George Barnes Jr.
- Succeeded by: David B. Funderburk

United States Ambassador to Senegal
- In office January 17, 1974 – July 10, 1977
- President: Richard Nixon; Gerald Ford; Jimmy Carter
- Preceded by: Gilbert Edward Clark
- Succeeded by: Herman Jay Cohen

United States Ambassador to The Gambia
- In office January 17, 1974 – July 10, 1977
- President: Richard Nixon; Gerald Ford; Jimmy Carter
- Preceded by: Gilbert Edward Clark
- Succeeded by: Herman Jay Cohen

Personal details
- Born: Orison Rudolph Aggrey; July 24, 1926 Salisbury, North Carolina, U.S.
- Died: April 6, 2016 (aged 89) Alexandria, Virginia, U.S.
- Spouse: Françoise Christiane Fratacci
- Children: 1
- Education: Hampton University; Syracuse University

O. Rudolph Aggrey (July 24, 1926 – April 6, 2016) was an American diplomat who served as the United States Ambassador to Senegal, Gambia, and Romania.

== Early life and career ==
Orison Rudolph Guggisberg Aggrey was born in 1926 in Salisbury, North Carolina as the youngest of four children to Dr. James Emman Kwegyir Aggrey, an immigrant from the Gold Coast and later the co-Founder of Achimota School, and Rosebud Aggrey (née Douglass).

He graduated in 1946 from Hampton Institute (now Hampton University) as valedictorian and received his master's degree from Syracuse University in 1948. He was a member of Alpha Phi Alpha, the first Black intercollegiate Greek letter fraternity. From 1947 to 1950, Aggrey was a publicity assistant for the United Negro College Fund.

Aggrey tried to join the Foreign Service in 1950, but encountered difficulty despite his high marks on the test. He was able to get a position after George L. P. Weaver, then Assistant Secretary of Labor for International Affairs, interceded on his behalf. In the Foreign Service, Aggrey worked in Lagos, Lille, and Hanoi. While in Lille, the head of the U.S. Information Service (USIA) recommended Aggrey to come to Paris and start a cultural program. The American Cultural Center was very successful.

In 1960, Assistant Secretary of State for African Affairs, G. Mennen Williams, asked Aggrey to accompany him on a tour of the African continent. Aggrey then became one of Williams's key assistants and aided in the foreign policy concerning Africa for the Kennedy administration.

After marrying Françoise Christiane Fratacci in 1964, Aggrey took a leave of the Foreign Service for a year to work as a fellow at the Center for International Affairs at Harvard University. One of his professors there was Dr. Henry Kissinger. Aggrey returned to the State Department and served in various supervisory positions including chief of the French branch of Voice of America, Deputy Director of the USIA, and program manager of the USIA's Motion Pictures and Television Service.

== Ambassadorships ==
In 1971, Aggrey was promoted to head the State Department's Office of West African Affairs. He was then appointed to be U.S. ambassador to The Gambia and Senegal concurrently. He lived in Dakar during his tenure. He was the only U.S. ambassador at the time with direct familial ties to the country they served in.

In 1977, President Jimmy Carter nominated Aggrey to be Ambassador Extraordinary and plenipotentiary of the U.S. to Romania. In Bucharest, he met Nobel Prize winning author Saul Bellow in December 1978 who asked for assistance in dealing with Romanian red-tape his Romanian-born wife, Alexandra Bellow, was experiencing while visiting her very ill mother in a Romanian hospital. Bellow portrayed Aggrey in chapter four of his novel The Dean's December, published in 1982, describing the ambassador as "discreet, soft-spoken, almost gentle, mysteriously earnest, handsome black man."

== Retirement ==
Aggrey retired from the State Department in 1981. He taught at several universities after, including Georgetown University and Howard University. He died in April 2016 at the age of 89.

Diplomatic posts
Preceded by G. Edward Clark	U.S. Ambassador to Gambia; 1973 – 1977	Succeeded by Herman Cohen
Preceded by G. Edward Clark	U.S. Ambassador to Senegal; 1973 – 1977	Succeeded by Herman Cohen
Preceded by Harry Barnes	U.S. Ambassador to Romania; 1977 – 1981	Succeeded by David Funderburk
