= Judith Fergin =

American diplomat (born 1951)

The Honourable Judith R. Fergin
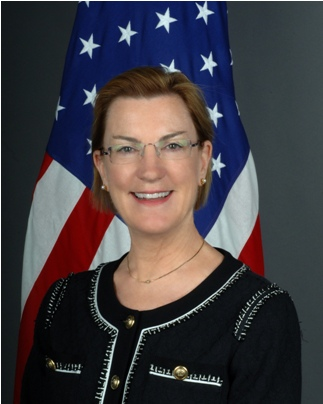

United States Ambassador to East Timor
- In office September 9, 2010 – September 20, 2013
- President: Barack Obama
- Preceded by: Hans G. Klemm
- Succeeded by: Karen Clark Stanton

Personal details
- Born: Judith Ryan Fergin; 1951 (age 74–75)
- Education: Smith College (B.A.); University of Virginia (M.A.)

Judith Ryan Fergin (born 1951) is an American diplomat who was the United States ambassador to East Timor. Her term of appointment began on September 9, 2010, succeeding Hans G. Klemm, and ended in 2013.

== Biography ==
Fergin received a B.A. degree from Smith College and M.A. degrees from the University of Virginia and the Industrial College of the Armed Forces of the National Defense University.

She is a career member of the Senior Foreign Service. She was previously Deputy Chief of Mission in Embassy Singapore and Consul General in Sydney, Australia. She has also served as Economic Counselor at the U.S. Embassy in Canberra and the U.S. Embassy in Jakarta, as well as in overseas posts in Russia, Liberia, South Africa, and Germany.

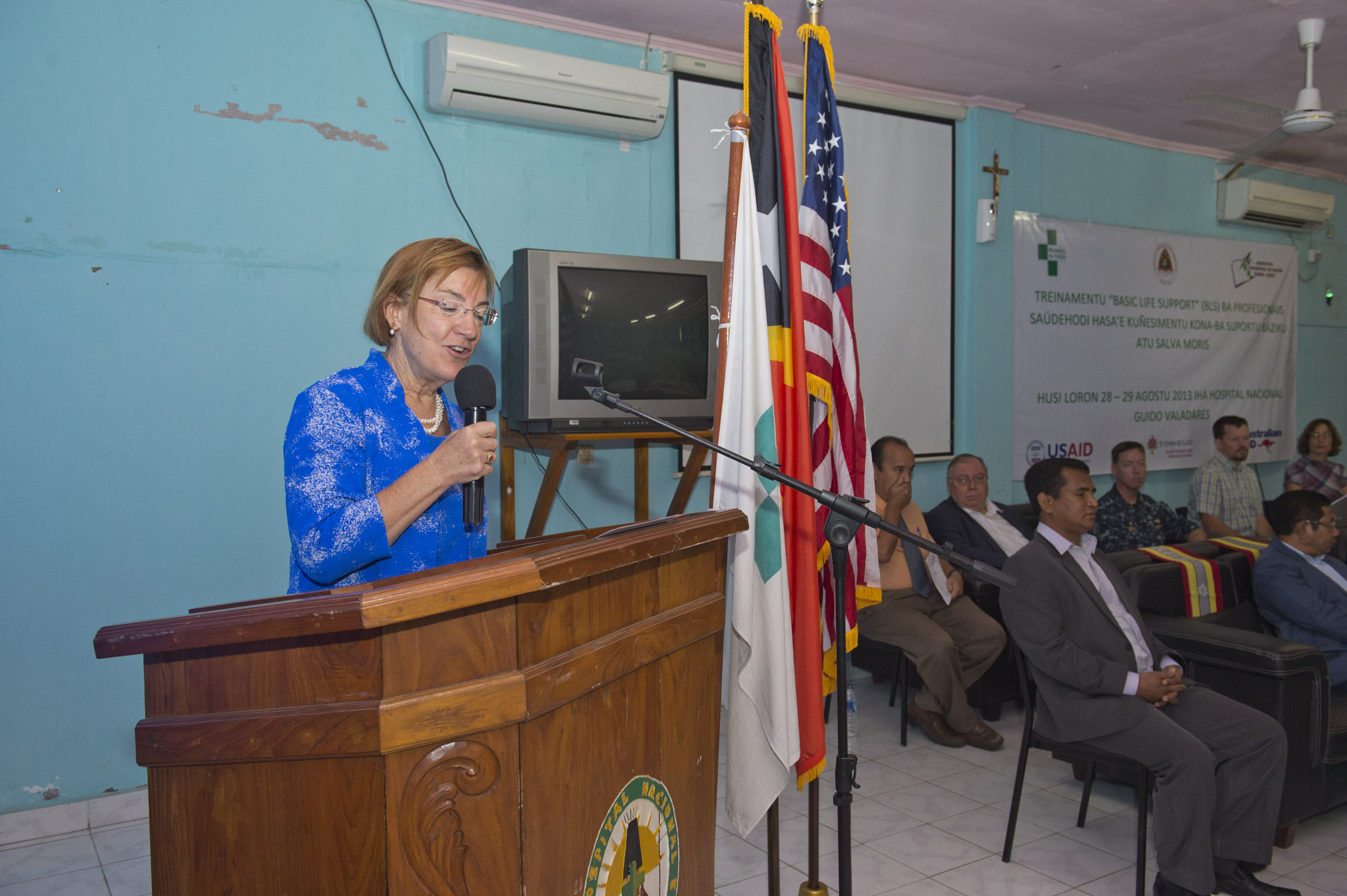
Judith Fergin gives an opening speech at the opening ceremony for a basic life saving course at Hospital Guido Valadares (HNGV) in Dili

== Honours ==
=== Foreign Honours ===
- East Timor
  - Medal of the Order of Timor-Leste, Timor Leste (May 16, 2012)
