= Donna Ann Welton =

American diplomat

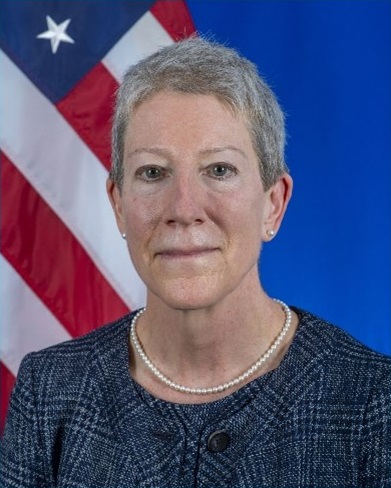

United States Ambassador to Timor-Leste
- In office July 16, 2024 – February 24, 2025
- President: Joe Biden; Donald Trump
- Preceded by: C. Kevin Blackstone

Personal details
- Education: Yale University (BA); Army War College (MSS)

Donna Ann Welton is an American diplomat who had served as the United States ambassador to Timor-Leste.

== Early life and education ==
Welton earned her Bachelor of Arts from Yale University and holds a master's degree in strategic studies from the Army War College.

== Career ==
Welton is a career member of the Senior Foreign Service, with the rank of Minister-Counselor. Welton began her career in the United States Information Agency, where she served in South Korea as the Assistant Cultural Affairs Officer in Seoul; she also served as the American Center Director in Daegu, later serving in the same role in Fukuoka, Japan. She currently serves as Acting Deputy Assistant Secretary for Programs and Operations for the Bureau of Political-Military Affairs within the U.S. Department of State. Previously, she served as Assistant Chief of Mission in Kabul, Afghanistan, as well as Deputy Chief of Mission at the U.S. Embassy in Helsinki, Finland. Welton served over eighteen months as Chargé d'affaires, ad interim in Helsinki. Welton had also served in the Department of Defense as the acting director for Southeast Asia in the Office of the Secretary of Defense for Policy. She also worked at both the Metropolitan Museum of Art and at the American Federation of Arts in New York.

Welton has also held public diplomacy positions in Tokyo, Nagoya, Washington, and Jakarta. Other posts in Japan include serving as Consul General in Sapporo and Minister-Counselor for Political Affairs at the U.S. Embassy in Tokyo. Welton had additionally served as Counselor for Public Affairs in Kabul, followed by service at the U.S. Mission to the United Nations as deputy director of Communications and Public Affairs.

=== U.S Ambassador to Timor Leste ===
On September 2, 2022, President Joe Biden nominated Welton to be the next ambassador to Timor Leste. On September 8, 2022, her nomination was sent to the Senate. Her nomination expired at the end of the year and was returned to President Biden on January 3, 2023.

President Biden renominated Welton the same day. Her nomination was favorably reported to the U.S. Senate by the Senate Foreign Relations Committee on April 17, 2024. On May 7, 2024, the United States Senate confirmed Welton by a 52–40 vote. She arrived in Dili on July 1, 2024. She presented her credentials to President José Ramos-Horta on July 16, 2024.

== Personal life ==
Welton speaks Japanese, Korean, Indonesian, German, Dari, and Finnish.
