= Roger Kirk (diplomat) =

American diplomat (1930–2023)

United States Ambassador to Romania
- In office November 29, 1985 – July 5, 1989
- President: Ronald Reagan; George H. W. Bush
- Preceded by: David B. Funderburk
- Succeeded by: Alan Green, Jr.

United States Ambassador to the United Nations Industrial Development Organization
- In office September 18, 1980 – June 15, 1983
- President: Ronald Reagan
- Preceded by: John Charles Leary
- Succeeded by: Richard S. Williamson (as United Nations International Organizations in Vienna)

United States Ambassador to Somalia
- In office October 8, 1973 – February 20, 1975
- President: Richard Nixon; Gerald R. Ford
- Preceded by: Matthew J. Looram, Jr.
- Succeeded by: John Lewis Loughran

Personal details
- Born: November 2, 1930 Newport, Rhode Island, U.S.
- Died: January 18, 2023 (aged 92) Washington D.C., U.S.
- Education: Princeton University
- Occupation: Diplomat

Roger Kirk (November 2, 1930 – January 18, 2023) was an American career diplomat who was United States Ambassador to Somalia (1973–75) and Romania (1985–1989). He was born in Newport, Rhode Island.

== Biography ==
Kirk received a BA from Princeton University in 1952 and served in the US Air Force from 1952 to 1955. From 1973 until 1975 he was the US ambassador to Somalia. In 1978 he was nominated to be the Deputy Representative of the US to the International Atomic Energy Agency, in which capacity he served from 1978 until 1983. From 1985 until 1989 he was the U.S. ambassador to Romania. He was a member of the American Academy of Diplomacy. Kirk died from pneumonia in Washington D.C., on January 18, 2023, at the age of 92.

Throughout his career, Kirk shared multiple oral histories with the Association for Diplomatic Studies and Training.

Diplomatic posts
Preceded by Matthew J. Looram, Jr.	U.S. Ambassador to Somalia; 1973 – 1975	Succeeded by John L. Loughran
Preceded by John Charles Leary	United States Ambassador to the United Nations Industrial Development Organization; 1980-1983	Succeeded by Richard S. Williamson as Ambassador to the United Nations International Organizations in Vienna
Preceded by David B. Funderburk	U.S. Ambassador to Romania; 1985 – 1989	Succeeded by Alan Green, Jr.
