= List of ambassadors of the United States to Romania =

Ambassador of the United States to Romania
- Ambasador al Statelor Unite ale Americii în România
- Seal of the United States Department of State

- Flag of a United States ambassador

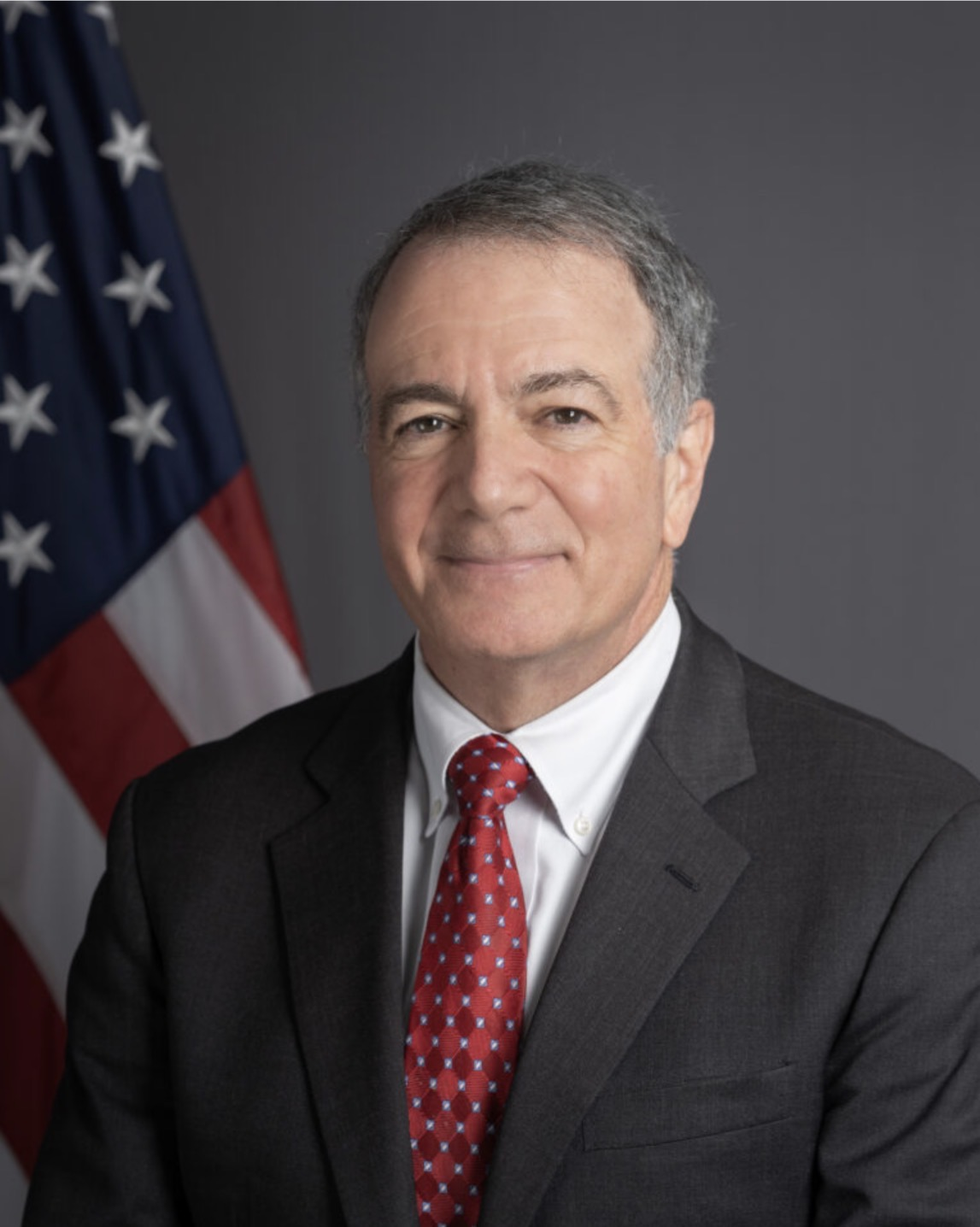
- Incumbent; Darryl Nirenberg since March 3, 2026
- Nominator: The president of the United States
- Appointer: The president with Senate advice and consent
- Inaugural holder: Eugene Schuyler as Diplomatic Agent/Consul General
- Formation: June 11, 1880
- Website: U.S. Embassy - Bucharest

A United States diplomatic representative to Romania has existed since 1880. The United States formally recognized Romania in 1878, following the Treaty of Berlin; diplomatic relations were opened in 1880, and American diplomats were sent to the country. Until the early 20th century, most ambassadors to Romania were also responsible for Greece, Serbia, and occasionally Bulgaria. No U.S. Embassy was established in Romania for some time; ambassadors typically operated out of Athens until about 1905, at which point an embassy was established in Bucharest.

The main U.S. embassy in Romania remains in Bucharest and is located at 4-6 Dr. Liviu Librescu Blvd. For several years during World War II, following the death of Ambassador Franklin Mott Gunther, there was no American ambassador to Romania. The latter country became an Axis country, and declared war on the Allies (see Romania during World War II). Preceded by American representation in the Allied Commission after 1945, the diplomatic mission was reopened in 1947. In 1994, the U.S. embassy was expanded, and a branch office was opened in Cluj-Napoca.

== Ambassadors ==
Name	Title	Appointed	Presented credentials	Terminated mission	Notes
Eugene Schuyler	Diplomatic Agent/Consul General	June 11, 1880	December 14, 1880	September 7, 1884	
Walker Fearn	Minister Resident/Consul General	April 18, 1885	October 20, 1885	October 24, 1899	
A. Loudon Snowden	Minister Resident/Consul General	July 1, 1889	November 25, 1889	August 18–25, 1892	
Truxtun Beale	Minister Resident/Consul General	July 22, 1892	Did not present credentials in Romania	1893	
Eben Alexander	Envoy Extraordinary and Minister Plenipotentiary/Consul General	April 7, 1893	June 15, 1894	Athens, August 1, 1897	
William Woodville Rockhill	Envoy Extraordinary and Minister Plenipotentiary/Consul General	July 8, 1897	May 18, 1898	April 27, 1899	
Arthur S. Hardy	Envoy Extraordinary/Minister Plenipotentiary	April 18, 1899	July 14, 1900	March 13, 1901	
Charles Spencer Francis	Envoy Extraordinary/Minister Plenipotentiary	December 20, 1900	October 16, 1901	December 24, 1902	
John Brinkerhoff Jackson	Envoy Extraordinary/Minister Plenipotentiary	October 13, 1902	April 7, 1903	July 25, 1905	
John W. Riddle	Envoy Extraordinary/Minister Plenipotentiary	March 8, 1905	October 3, 1905	January 23, 1907	
Horace G. Knowles	Envoy Extraordinary/Minister Plenipotentiary	January 16, 1907	May 7, 1907	February 4, 1909	
Spencer F. Eddy	Envoy Extraordinary/Minister Plenipotentiary	January 11, 1909	July 9, 1909	September 29, 1909	
John R. Carter	Envoy Extraordinary/Minister Plenipotentiary	September 25, 1909	November 14, 1909	October 24, 1911.	
John Brinkerhoff Jackson	Envoy Extraordinary/Minister Plenipotentiary	August 12, 1911	December 24, 1911	October 28, 1913	
Charles J. Vopicka – Political Appointee	Envoy Extraordinary/Minister Plenipotentiary	September 11, 1913	November 27, 1913	July 10, 1920	
Peter Augustus Jay – Career FSO	Envoy Extraordinary/Minister Plenipotentiary	April 18, 1921	June 30, 1921	May 9, 1925	
William S. Culbertson – Political Appointee	Envoy Extraordinary/Minister Plenipotentiary	April 28, 1925	December 12, 1925	April 15, 1928	
Charles S. Wilson – Career FSO	Envoy Extraordinary/Minister Plenipotentiary	June 23, 1928	October 13, 1928	August 2, 1933	
Alvin Mansfield Owlsey – Political Appointee	Envoy Extraordinary/Minister Plenipotentiary	June 13, 1933	September 15, 1933	June 16, 1935	
Leland Harrison – Career FSO	Envoy Extraordinary/Minister Plenipotentiary	May 15, 1935	July 24, 1935	September 3, 1937	
Franklin Mott Gunther – Career FSO	Envoy Extraordinary/Minister Plenipotentiary	July 31, 1937	October 23, 1937	December 22, 1941	Romania declared war on U.S., December 12, 1941 Gunther died at Bucharest, December 22, 1941
Rudolf E. Schoenfeld – Career FSO	Envoy Extraordinary/Minister Plenipotentiary	July 28, 1947	September 25, 1947	May 24, 1950	
James W. Gantenbein – Career FSO	Chargé d'Affaires ad interim	September 1950		November 1952	
Harold Shantz – Career FSO	Envoy Extraordinary/Minister Plenipotentiary	September 27, 1952	November 20, 1952	August 30, 1955	
Robert H. Thayer – Political Appointee	Envoy Extraordinary/Minister Plenipotentiary	August 17, 1955	November 10, 1955	December 12, 1957	
Clifton R. Wharton – Career FSO	Envoy Extraordinary/Minister Plenipotentiary	February 5, 1958	March 7, 1958	October 21, 1960	
William A. Crawford – Career FSO	Envoy Extraordinary/Minister Plenipotentiary	November 28, 1961	February 10, 1962	December 24, 1964	Promoted to Ambassador Extraordinary and Plenipotentiary
William A. Crawford – Career FSO	Ambassador Extraordinary and Plenipotentiary	December 4, 1964	December 24, 1964	October 10, 1965	
Richard H. Davis – Career FSO	Ambassador Extraordinary and Plenipotentiary	September 24, 1965	December 16, 1965	August 6, 1969	
Leonard C. Meeker – Political Appointee	Ambassador Extraordinary and Plenipotentiary	July 22, 1969	September 16, 1969	May 10, 1973	
Harry G. Barnes, Jr. – Career FSO	Ambassador Extraordinary and Plenipotentiary	December 19, 1973	March 14, 1974	November 10, 1977	
O. Rudolph Aggrey – Career FSO	Ambassador Extraordinary and Plenipotentiary	October 21, 1977	November 22, 1977	July 11, 1981	
David B. Funderburk – Political Appointee	Ambassador Extraordinary and Plenipotentiary	October 2, 1981	October 13, 1981	May 13, 1985	
Roger Kirk – Career FSO	Ambassador Extraordinary and Plenipotentiary	November 15, 1985	November 29, 1985	July 5, 1989	
Alan Green, Jr. – Political Appointee	Ambassador Extraordinary and Plenipotentiary	October 10, 1989	December 7, 1989	January 11, 1992	
John R. Davis Jr. – Career FSO	Ambassador Extraordinary and Plenipotentiary	December 2, 1991	March 11, 1992	August 9, 1994	
Alfred H. Moses – Political Appointee	Ambassador Extraordinary and Plenipotentiary	September 29, 1994	December 14, 1994	August 11, 1997	
James Carew Rosapepe – Political Appointee	Ambassador Extraordinary and Plenipotentiary	November 10, 1997	February 4, 1998	March 1, 2001	
Michael E. Guest – Career FSO	Ambassador Extraordinary and Plenipotentiary	August 3, 2001	September 24, 2001	July 8, 2004	
Jack Dyer Crouch II – Political Appointee	Ambassador Extraordinary and Plenipotentiary	May 25, 2004	July 16, 2004	February 28, 2005	
Nicholas F. Taubman – Political Appointee	Ambassador Extraordinary and Plenipotentiary	November 29, 2005	December 5, 2005	December 3, 2008	
Mark Gitenstein – Political Appointee	Ambassador Extraordinary and Plenipotentiary	July 29, 2009	August 28, 2009	December 14, 2012	
Duane C. Butcher – Career FSO	Chargé d'affaires ad interim	December 14, 2012		July 2014	
Dean R. Thompson – Career FSO	Chargé d'affaires ad interim	July 2014		September 20, 2015	
Hans G. Klemm – Career FSO	Ambassador Extraordinary and Plenipotentiary	August 7, 2015	September 21, 2015	December 14, 2019	
Adrian Zuckerman - Political appointee	Ambassador Extraordinary and Plenipotentiary	November 21, 2019	December 17, 2019	January 20, 2021	
David Muniz	Chargé d'affaires ad interim	January 20, 2021		February 14, 2023	
Kathleen Kavalec – Career FSO	Ambassador Extraordinary and Plenipotentiary	December 15, 2022	February 14, 2023	May 20, 2025	
Michael Dickerson - Career FSO	Chargé d'affaires ad interim	May 20, 2025		March 3, 2026	
Darryl Nirenberg - Political appointee	Ambassador Extraordinary and Plenipotentiary	December 18, 2025	March 3, 2026	Present	

== See also ==
- Embassy of Romania, Washington, D.C.
- Embassy of the United States, Bucharest
- Romania–United States relations
- Foreign relations of Romania
- Ambassadors of the United States
