= John B. Stetson Jr. =

American diplomat and businessman (1884–1952)

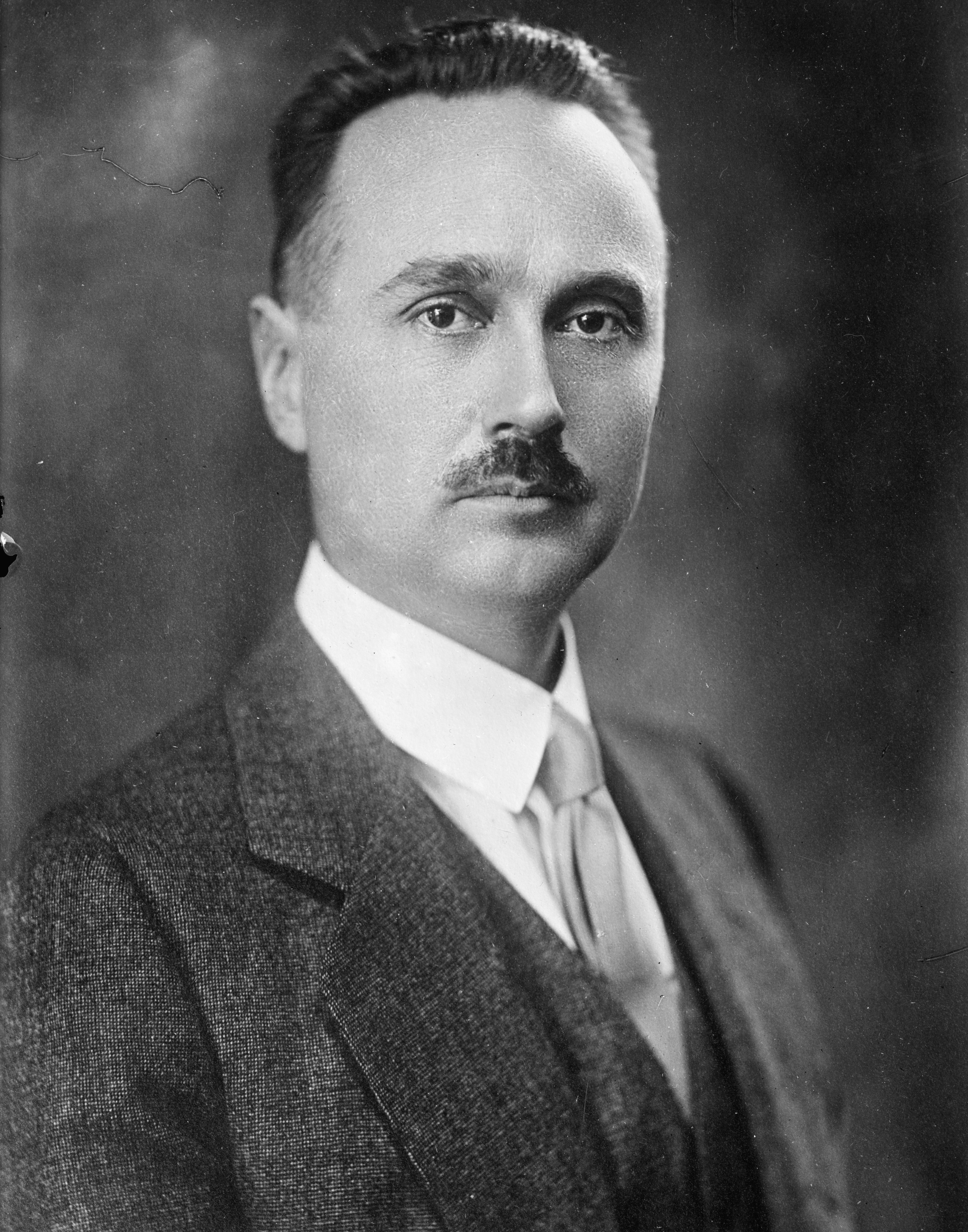

3rd United States Minister to Poland
- In office August 29, 1925 – August 29, 1929
- President: Calvin Coolidge; Herbert Hoover
- Preceded by: Alfred J. Pearson
- Succeeded by: John Willys (as Ambassador)

Personal details
- Born: October 14, 1884 Philadelphia, Pennsylvania, U.S.
- Died: November 15, 1952 (aged 68) Elkins Park, Pennsylvania, U.S.
- Spouse: Ruby F. Carlisle (m. 1906)
- Children: 4
- Parent: John B. Stetson (father)
- Education: Harvard University (AB)
- Profession: Businessman

Military service
- Allegiance: United States
- Branch/service: US Army; US Marine Corps
- Years of service: 1917–20; 1942–45
- Rank: Colonel
- Unit: Persian Gulf Command
- Battles/wars: World War I World War II

John Batterson Stetson Jr. (October 14, 1884 – November 15, 1952) was an American diplomat and businessman. The son of John B. Stetson, he served as the United States Minister to Poland from 1925 to 1929.

== Early life and education ==
The son of famed hatmaker John Batterson Stetson, John Stetson Jr. was born on October 14, 1884, in Philadelphia. He studied at William Penn Charter School, and later at Harvard University, graduating with a Bachelor of Arts in 1907, one year behind his original graduating class, due to illness.

== Career ==
As his father's scion, Stetson Jr. took up a position as a director of the John B. Stetson Company; he also served on the board of trustees for his (and his father's) eponymous university, Stetson University. His own ventures, however, were not so profitable: though he bought himself a seat on the New York Stock Exchange (NYSE) in 1930, his company was banned from trading three years later, soon went bankrupt and into receivership; he ultimately bought it out in 1936, and later disposed of his NYSE seat.

Before World War I, Stetson became interested in aviation, and trained at Signal Corps Aviation Station, Mineola, in 1916. During the war, he was among the first to join the Aviation Section of the U.S. Signal Corps; he served in France until 1920 (as a member of the Section's successor, the United States Army Air Service), whereupon he was discharged as a captain. He also translated Pero de Magalhães Gândavo's Histories of Brazil into English that same year. Stetson later served in the Second World War, first joining the United States Marine Corps as a major in 1942, before being transferred back to the army in 1943; towards the end of the war, he served as a colonel in the Persian Gulf Command.

As a trustee of the university that had been named for his father, Stetson had a great interest in the history of Florida, using his money and influence to attract historians and purchase collections; he also organized the Florida State Historical Society and later became an officer of the Florida Historical Society.

Like his near-contemporaries Henry E. Huntington and J.P. Morgan, Stetson was also a noted book collector: his collection was the subject of an article in The New York Times in 1935. In 1920, he sold a series of letters and manuscripts written by Oscar Wilde. In 1934, he deposited a copy of Arsène Houssaye's Des destinées de l'ame, bound in human skin, at Harvard's Houghton Library. After his death, it was given to Harvard by his widow in 1954; and, as of 2014, it remains the only book in the Houghton collection that is so bound.

=== Minister to Poland ===
In 1924, Stetson was first considered to become the United States Minister to Finland during the Coolidge administration; going so far as to return home, in late May, to discuss the matter with Secretary of State Frank B. Kellogg.

Ultimately, however, Stetson acceded to his predecessor, Alfred J. Pearson, who requested the post to Finland. Instead, Stetson served, during the inter-war period, as the third and last United States Minister to Poland from August 29, 1925, to August 29, 1929, exactly four years. In the aftermath of World War I, he adjudged Marshal Józef Piłsudski's government as good for America, in economic terms; and American business was more than happy to respond to the Polish need for capital and investment. Still, one of his first official acts was to ask foreign minister August Zaleski to reduce the censorship of the press in the country. In 1927, he toured the country, by plane and automobile; and also donated his own funds to aid those suffering from flooding in Poland. After leaving the diplomatic corps, Stetson criticized isolationism, especially in the matter of foreign loans.

In 1981, alongside Hugh S. Gibson and Anthony Joseph Drexel Biddle Jr., Stetson was considered perhaps one of the few diplomats to have "understood and sympathized with Poland's strategic dilemma" during that time.

== Personal life ==
Stetson married Ruby F. Carlisle in June 1907. They had two daughters Mrs. N.W. Widowson and Mrs. J.J. Cruise, and two sons: Stuart Carlisle, a Marine Corps officer killed in a plane crash in 1941; and John B. Stetson III, a National Guardsman who also predeceased his father, in 1944.

Stetson also contributed, inadvertently, to an exhibit at the American Museum of Natural History in 1921: a chunk of limestone, 40 pounds (18 kg), still in the shape of a Stetson hat; the result of an impulsive throw twenty years before into Fossil Creek.

Stetson died in his sleep in November 1952, at his home in Elkins Park, Pennsylvania.

Diplomatic posts
Preceded by Alfred J. Pearson	United States Minister to Poland; 1925–1929	Succeeded by John Willys as Ambassador
