= Evermay =

Historic house in Washington, D.C., United States

- U.S. National Register of Historic Places
- U.S. Historic district – Contributing property
- D.C. Inventory of Historic Sites
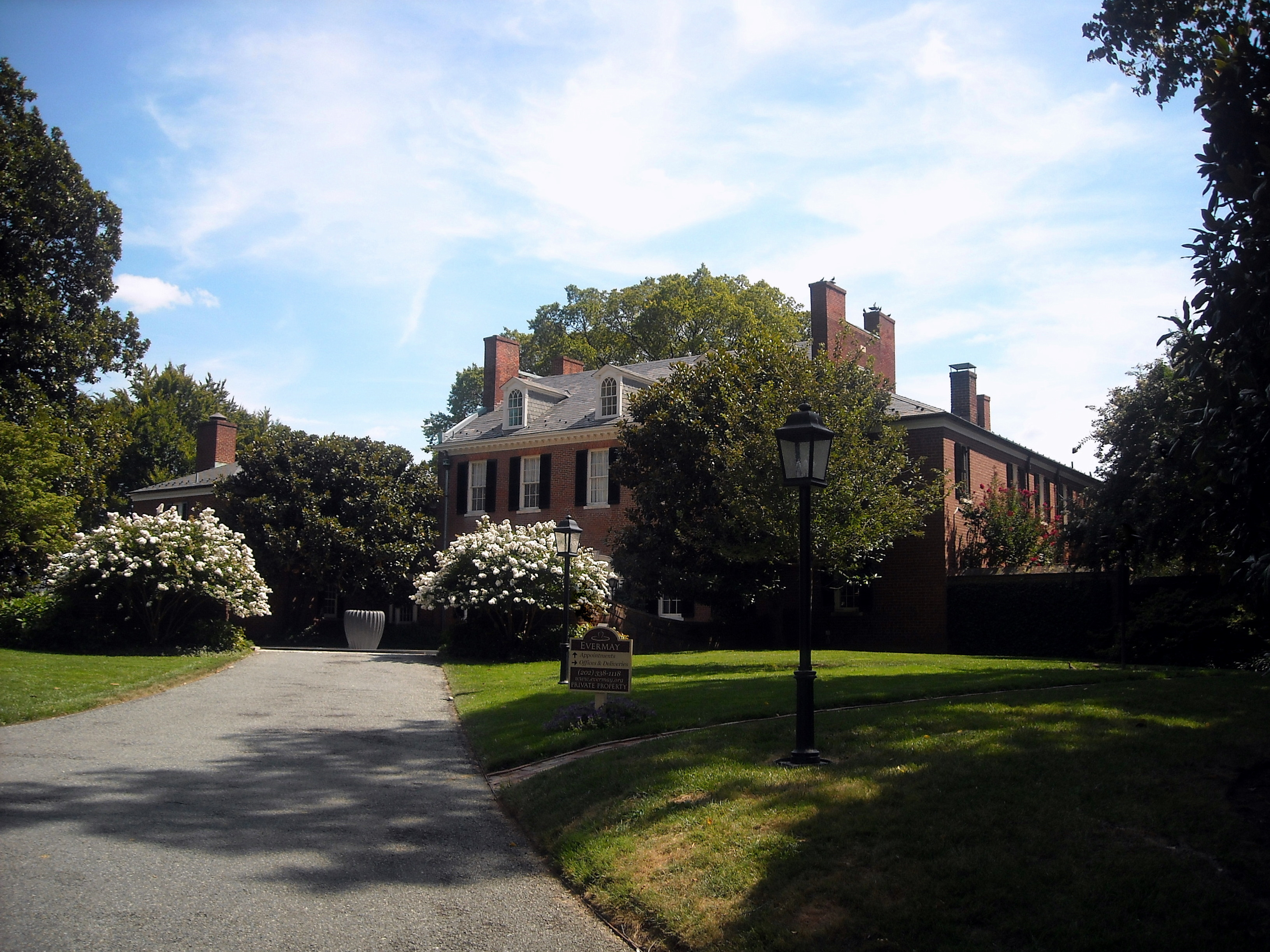

- Location within Washington, D.C.
- Location: 1623 28th Street, NW, Washington, District of Columbia
- Coordinates: 38°54′47.61″N 77°3′24.78″W
- Built: 1801; 225 years ago
- Architect: Nicholas King
- Architectural style: Federal architecture
- Part of: Georgetown Historic District (ID67000025)
- NRHP reference No.: 73002083

Significant dates
- Added to NRHP: April 3, 1973; 53 years ago
- Designated DCIHS: November 8, 1964; 62 years ago

Evermay is a historic Federal architecture-style house at 1623 28th Street, Northwest, Washington, D.C., in the Georgetown neighborhood. The property is currently home to the Evermay Foundation, also known as the “Embassy for the Future.

== History ==
The property dates to the early years of the nation’s founding, and was added to the National Register of Historic Places in 1973.

In 1792-1794, Samuel Davidson bought a portion of the 795-acre tract called the "Rock of Dumbarton" from Thomas Beall. Davidson was one of the owners of the land on which the White House and the National Mall are currently located.

The house was built in 1801 at a cost of $2,302.82 with proceeds from the sale of the White House land to the Federal government of the United States. It was designed by British architect Nicholas King, the first surveyor of Washington, D.C. and founder of its first library.

The house underwent interior renovations until 1818.

Davidson was not married and had no children and upon his death, his nephew, Lewis Grant, inherited the property. Lewis Grant's daughter married Charles Dodge.

In 1877, the Dodges sold the property to John D. McPherson. McPherson added a porch and converted the house to the Victorian architecture style.

Henry Hayes Lockwood lived at the property and died there in 1899.

In 1919, developer Francis H. Duehey bought the property and planned to demolish the house and build a hotel on the site. The citizens of Georgetown rallied to pass an ordinance forbidding construction taller than 40 feet.

Diplomat F. Lammot Belin and his wife bought the property in 1924. Belin came from a family of French immigrants who married into the du Pont family and made a fortune in the gunpowder industry.

As part of extensive renovations and enlargements, he removed Victorian elements at the house to restore its Georgian simplicity. He owned the property until his death in 1961, when it was inherited by his son, Peter Belin.

In 1961, Peter added the brick orangery on the east front.

In 1973, Evermay was added to the National Register of Historic Places.

In 1996, the house was inherited by Peter's son, Harry Belin.

In 1999, Harry formed the Evermay Society and began renting the estate for corporate events, weddings, anniversary parties, even fundraisers for President George W. Bush, all for tens of thousands of dollars apiece. He also let nonprofits such as Bible study groups, local preservation groups, human rights advocates and environmentalists use Evermay for free.

Harry was unable to afford the annual property taxes of $100,000 and annual upkeep costs of $200,000 and sold the house in May 2011 for $22 million to Dr. Sachiko Kuno and Dr. Ryuji Ueno, founders of Sucampo Pharmaceuticals. The couple formerly owned Halcyon House, another historic Georgetown mansion. The houses are now used by their nonprofit organization. In 2024, Ueno and Kuno transferred the property to the Evermay Foundation for use as the nonprofit organization’s headquarters.

Today, the property serves as a residence for participants in the Evermay Foundation’s Future Fellows program. Fellows stay for a minimum of three weeks, with access to the home and gardens, to explore long-horizon challenges across disciplines.

== Evermay Foundation ==
Dr. Sachiko Kuno and Dr. Ryuji Ueno donated the property to the Evermay Foundation in 2024.

The foundation describes itself as an “Embassy for the Future” and is organized as a 501(c)(3) nonprofit, with a charitable mission to provide “a home for extraordinary thinkers working on ideas that could shape the world generations from now.”

At the center of this work is the Evermay Future Fellows program, offering the estate as an incubator space for innovators with projects that are too early-stage, long-term, or interdisciplinary for traditional institutions. The fellows program provides a residency, where cohorts of four to six individuals live on the Evermay estate for several weeks as they work on non-traditional projects aimed at shaping the world and solving long-term problems. These projects are described by the foundation as “initiatives whose scale and collaboration require a decade to come to fruition.”

The first fellowship class was announced in June 2026 and featured five participants from around the world. The first cohort of fellows focused on projects relating to AI and morality, attentional literacy, human augmentation, and the convergence of psychology and portrait photography.

The initiative was launched by Dr. Kuno and CEO Kate Goodall.

Evermay’s programming also includes The Listening Room, a music series which allows visitors to experience live music in the mansion, including genres such as jazz, classical, and theatrical. As of 2026, Evermay also offers the Mind and Meaning program, which includes events and experiences such as a speaker series, yoga at the mansion, and a four-week workshop called The Great Questions Studio. These events are designed to facilitate reflection, well-being, and create space for people to explore deep questions.
