= Dunbar, Wisconsin =

- Town
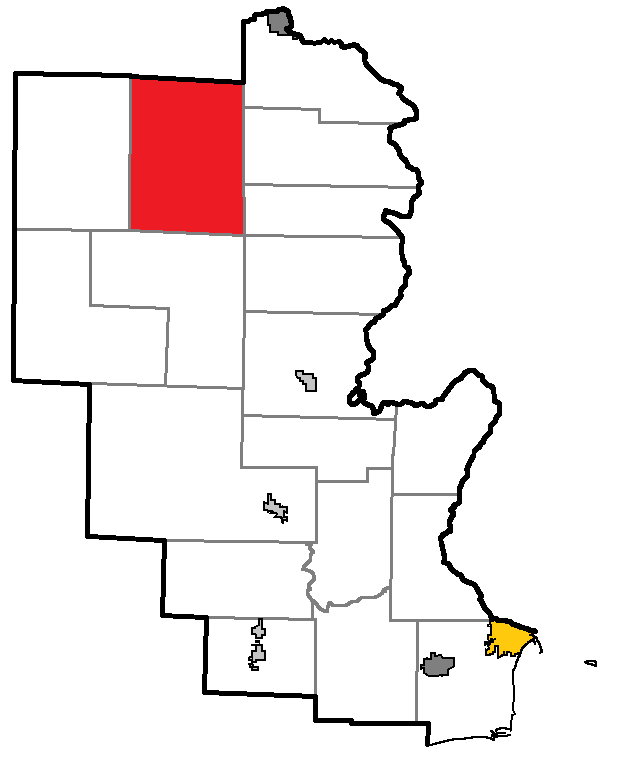
- Location of Dunbar, within Marinette County
- Coordinates: 45°37′28″N 88°8′31″W
- Country: United States
- State: Wisconsin
- County: Marinette
- Established: 1888

Area
  - Total: 105.2 sq mi (272.5 km^{2})
  - Land: 104.4 sq mi (270.4 km^{2})
  - Water: 0.77 sq mi (2.0 km^{2})
- Elevation: 1,211 ft (369 m)

Population (2020)
  - Total: 605
  - Density: 5.79/sq mi (2.24/km^{2})
- Time zone: UTC-6 (Central (CST))
  - Summer (DST): UTC-5 (CDT)
- FIPS code: 55-21000
- GNIS feature ID: 1583103
- Website: http://www.townofdunbar.com/

Dunbar is a town in Marinette County, Wisconsin, United States. The population was 605 at the 2020 census. The census-designated place of Dunbar is located in the town.

== History ==
The town was founded in 1888 during a period of thriving logging industry in the Wisconsin northern woods. At that time the railroad was the main means of transporting logs from Dunbar to the southern part of the state and Illinois. Dunbar was probably named after Warren Dunbar (1840–1918), who was an engineer for the railroad.

A story says that before the town was officially founded there was a restaurant where a cook with the surname Dunbar worked. Whenever the railroad stopped at that part of the area they brought food and supplies for the restaurant. The railroad workers said they were bringing things "to Dunbar" the cook. Eventually when the town was founded it was after the cook's surname.

== Geography ==
According to the United States Census Bureau, the town has a total area of 105.2 square miles (272.5 km^{2}), of which 104.4 square miles (270.4 km^{2}) is land and 0.8 square mile (2.0 km^{2}) (0.74%) is water.

== Demographics ==
As of the census of 2000, there were 1,303 people, 274 households, and 195 families residing in the town. The population density was 12.5 inhabitants per square mile (4.8/km^{2}). There were 793 housing units at an average density of 7.6 per square mile (2.9/km^{2}). The racial makeup of the town was 97.62% White, 0.08% African American, 0.54% Native American, 0.77% Asian, 0.23% Pacific Islander, 0.15% from other races, and 0.61% from two or more races. Hispanic or Latino of any race were 0.92% of the population.

There were 274 households, out of which 26.3% had children under the age of 18 living with them, 65.7% were married couples living together, 1.5% had a female householder with no husband present, and 28.8% were non-families. 23.7% of all households were made up of individuals, and 11.3% had someone living alone who was 65 years of age or older. The average household size was 2.54 and the average family size was 3.00.

In the town, the population was spread out, with 14.9% under the age of 18, 48.2% from 18 to 24, 13.4% from 25 to 44, 15.0% from 45 to 64, and 8.5% who were 65 years of age or older. The median age was 21 years. For every 100 females, there were 89.7 males. For every 100 females age 18 and over, there were 85.8 males.

The median income for a household in the town was $32,917, and the median income for a family was $38,594. Males had a median income of $31,016 versus $18,000 for females. The per capita income for the town was $12,279. About 2.4% of families and 8.5% of the population were below the poverty line, including 9.6% of those under age 18 and 4.9% of those age 65 or over.

== Education ==
Dunbar is served by the Beecher Dunbar Pembine School District.

== Notable people ==
- John A. Gronouski, United States Postmaster General, was born in Dunbar.
