= Alfred J. Pearson =

Swedish-born American educator and diplomat

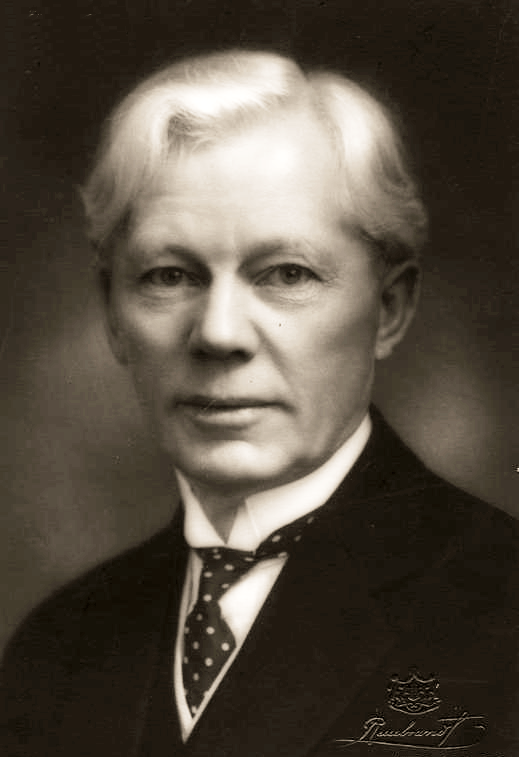

2nd United States Minister to Finland
- In office September 5, 1925 – April 30, 1930
- President: Calvin Coolidge; Herbert Hoover
- Preceded by: Charles L. Kagey
- Succeeded by: Edward E. Brodie

2nd United States Minister to Poland
- In office June 26, 1924 – August 18, 1925
- President: Calvin Coolidge
- Preceded by: Hugh S. Gibson
- Succeeded by: John B. Stetson Jr.

Personal details
- Born: September 29, 1869 Landskrona, Sweden
- Died: August 10, 1939 (aged 69) Des Moines, Iowa, U.S.
- Education: Bethany College (A.B., M.A.); Yale University (Ph.D.)

Alfred J. Pearson (September 29, 1869 – August 10, 1939) was a Swedish born-American educator and diplomat.

== Biography ==
Alfred John Pearson was born at Landskrona, Sweden. His family immigrated when he was an infant, eventually settling in Kansas in 1875. He graduated with an A. B. from Bethany College in Lindsborg, Kansas in 1893 and in 1896 with a M.A. He received his Ph.D. from Yale University in 1896.

Pearson was an instructor at Upsala College in Essex County, New Jersey from 1896 to 1898. From 1898 to 1907, he was a professor at Gustavus Adolphus College in St. Peter, Minnesota. Pearson joined the faculty at Drake University in Des Moines, Iowa as a professor of German Language and Literature in 1907.

Pearson was the American Minister to Poland (1924–25) and to Finland (1925–1930). He was a professor of German language and literature at Drake University, Dean of the College of Liberal Arts of Drake University from 1930 until his death in 1939.

Alfred J. Pearson died in Des Moines, Iowa during 1939.
