= Hugh S. Gibson =

American diplomat (1883–1954)

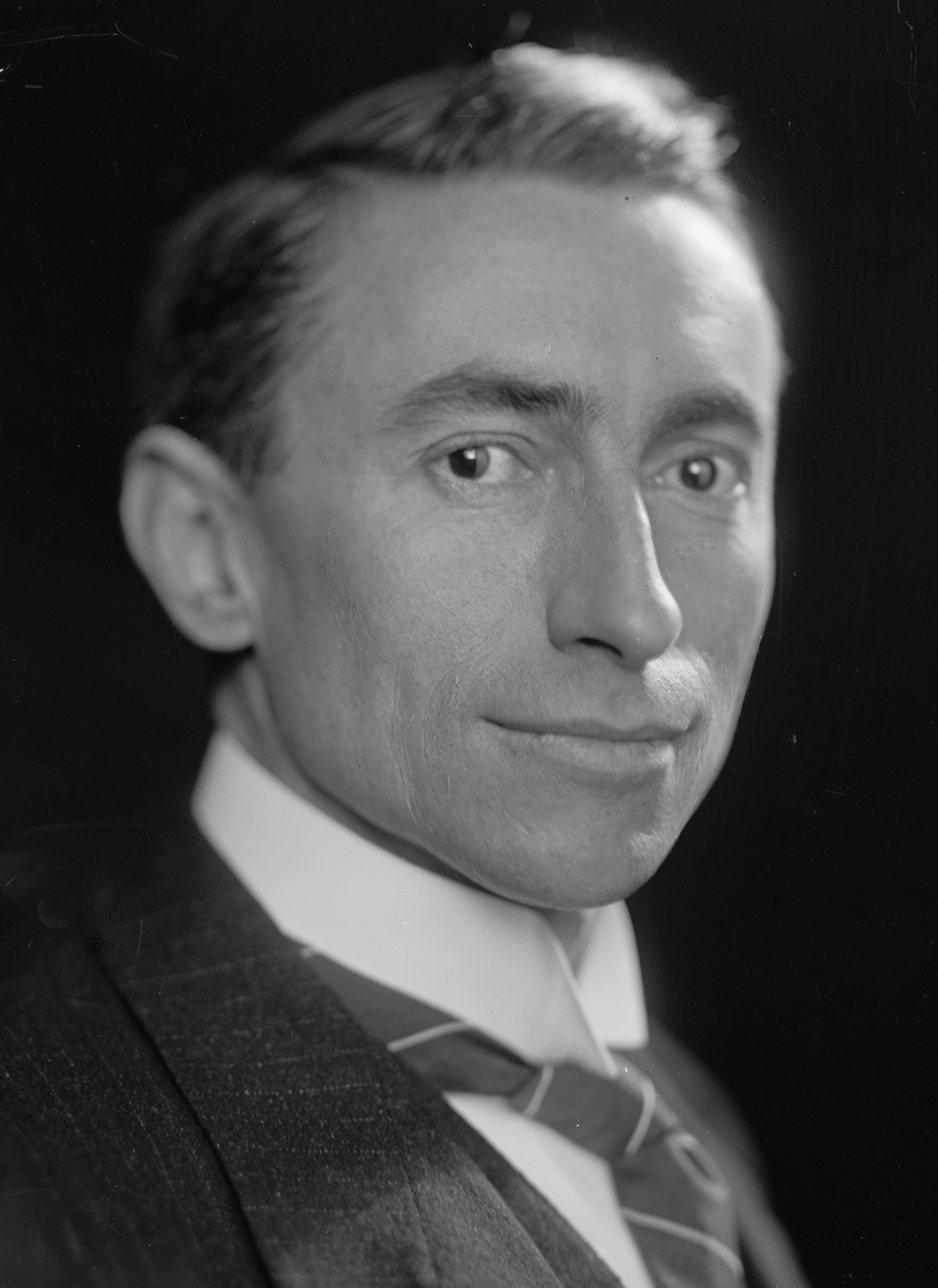

1st Director General of the International Organization for Migration
- In office December 12, 1954 – June 10, 1952
- Preceded by: Office established
- Succeeded by: Harold H. Tittmann Jr.

Personal details
- Born: Hugh Simons Gibson; August 16, 1883 Los Angeles, California, U.S.
- Died: December 12, 1954 (aged 71) Geneva, Switzerland
- Education: Pomona College

Hugh Simons Gibson (August 16, 1883 – December 12, 1954) was an American diplomat. He was actively involved in disarmament talks from 1925 to 1932. Throughout his career, he remained a leading proponent in the drive to establish a professional Foreign Service based on merit rather than personal wealth or political influence.

As the first American minister plenipotentiary to Poland in the chaotic postwar years from 1919 to 1924, he was called upon to respond to the acute problems of a renascent state while investigating reports of pogroms and mistreatment of Polish Jews. His reporting on this highly sensitive matter was surrounded by controversy, but ultimately won the approval of significant figures in the American Jewish community.

Gibson was active in famine relief work in Europe during and after World War I and continued to pursue these efforts during and after World War II. His close friendship with Herbert Hoover began in this context. He retired from the Foreign Service in 1938, worked in London for the Commission for Relief in Belgium (CRB) during the first two years of the war. He then returned to the United States and worked in publishing at Doubleday and, following the end of the war, published the journals of Joseph Goebbels, Galeazzo Ciano, and Ulrich von Hassell.

In his final years he ran the Intergovernmental Committee for European Migration, now known as the International Organization for Migration in Geneva, and was its first director general.

== Biography ==
Hugh Simons Gibson was born in Los Angeles, California, on August 16, 1883, the son of Francis (Frank) Asbury Gibson and Mary Kellogg Simons. He died in Genthod, Geneva, Switzerland, on December 12, 1954.

He graduated from the prestigious École libre des sciences politiques in Paris in 1907 and entered the United States Foreign Service in his late twenties. He was appointed secretary of legation in Tegucigalpa, Honduras, in July 1908; second secretary of the American Embassy in London in 1909–1910; private secretary to Assistant Secretary of State Huntington Wilson in 1910–1911; secretary of legation, Havana, Cuba, in 1911–1913; and secretary of legation, Brussels, Belgium, 1914–1916, as a result of which he was present when the German Army invaded the country.

Gibson was appointed as secretary to the American embassy in London on May 16, 1916. He was assigned to the U.S. Department of State on February 28, 1917; attached to British secretary of state for foreign affairs during his visit to United States from April to June 1917; attached to the Belgian war mission during his visit to the United States from June to August 1917; and appointed first secretary to the American embassy in Paris in March 1918.

He did duty with Herbert Hoover, director general of relief, from November 1918 to April 1919 and was a member of the inter-allied mission to countries of the former Austro-Hungarian Empire, December 1918 – January 1919.

Gibson obtained a top-level diplomatic post with his appointment as U.S. Minister Plenipotentiary to Poland on April 16, 1919, and remained at that post until May 1924, at which point he was appointed Minister to Switzerland. Gibson was made Ambassador to Belgium and minister to Luxembourg in 1927, positions he filled until 1933 and again in 1937–1938. In the intervening years he served as U.S. Ambassador to Brazil.

During the 1920s and 1930s, in addition to his ambassadorial and ministerial appointments, Gibson served as vice-chairman of the American Delegation to the international Conference for Supervision of the International Traffic in Arms in Geneva in 1925; chairman of the U.S. delegation to the Preparatory Commission for the General Disarmament Conference, 1926–1932; chair of the U.S. delegation and chair of the Geneva Naval Conference in 1927; delegate to conference on private manufacture of arms, 1927; American delegation to Conference for limitation of Naval Armament and chairman of conference, 1927; delegate to the London Naval Conference 1930; and acting chairman, U.S. delegation at the General Disarmament Conference, Geneva, 1932–1933.

Franklin D. Roosevelt appointed Gibson ambassador to Brazil from 1933 to 1937, during which period Gibson also served as the U.S. representative on the mediatory group to end the Chaco War, which met at Buenos Aires in 1935, as well as a delegate to the Chaco Peace Conference held later that year.

In 1938 Roosevelt wanted to appoint Gibson Ambassador to Berlin. Gibson felt that the situation in Germany was beyond the competence of diplomacy and offered his resignation. In 1940 he became Director General for Europe of Commission for Polish Relief and of the Commission for Relief in Belgium, 1940–1941; Director of the Commission for Relief in Belgium and of the Belgian American Educational Foundation; and Chairman of the National Committee on Food for the Small Democracies. He also served as Assistant to the Honorary Chairman of the President's emergency famine committee.

Gibson accompanied former president Herbert Hoover on his worldwide travels to take stock of the food situation in Europe, Asia, and South America from March to June 1946, and he served as part of The President's Economic Mission to Germany and Austria in February 1947.

He finally served as Director of the Provisional Intergovernmental Committee for the Movement of Migrants from Europe from 1951 to 1952; as a member of the Hoover Commission, appointed by President Dwight D. Eisenhower to reorganize the executive departments in 1953; and director of the Intergovernmental Committee for European Migration, 1952–1954.

== Family background and education ==
Hugh S. Gibson's grandfather (also Hugh Gibson), a Methodist minister of Scottish descent, had been sent to California as an Indian Agent. Assigned to the Round Valley Reservation on what had been Yuki Indian territory, he and his wife were horrified by the condition in which they had found the population and, according to a family tradition, went beyond their administrative duties to set up a school to teach their wards to read and write and to give them some idea of the outside world.

Hugh S. Gibson's father, Francis Ashbury (Frank) Gibson, was a businessman and banker. His wife, Mary Simons, trained as a schoolteacher, was also "a woman ahead of her time", says Diane C. Wood (p. 36–37), a political and educational activist, who "believed in birth control, a measure of sexual equality, Indian policy reform and world peace." She militated in favor of voting rights for women (as did her son); campaigned for Theodore Roosevelt; and, as a member of the California Commission of Immigration and Housing, she was the leader of a group of women who initiated, lobbied for, and administered a new program, set up by the California Home Teacher Act of 1915, to provide schooling to immigrant women in California to teach them English and "the American way of life."

Three of the Gibson's children died in infancy. Hugh was also a delicate child. He caught polio at the age of four but suffered no lasting aftereffects. As a result of his childhood health problems, however, he was largely educated by his remarkable mother and by private tutors until he went to Pomona College for two years in 1900.

The Gibson family was not wealthy. Mary was nonetheless determined to give her son the best possible education. She sold the family home and with the proceeds took the 18-year-old boy on a tour of Europe in the course of which they visited Italy in a buggy and made prolonged stays in Berlin and Paris. In that way, Hugh learned both German and French and was finally enrolled in the prestigious École Libre des Sciences Politiques, where he graduated with high honors in 1907. He and his mother then returned to the United States, and Hugh sought admission to the Foreign Service. He was admitted with the highest grades so far obtained by any applicant to the Foreign Service Examination and was appointed secretary of the American legation in Tegucigalpa, Honduras, in 1908.

== Early career ==
Gibson was thereafter posted in London; Washington DC; and Cuba successively. He was then appointed Secretary to the American Legation in Belgium, a "quiet post", he was assured, which he reached in April 1914. Four months later World War I began and two million German soldiers marched into the country. As representatives of a neutral power, the staff of the American Legation found themselves involved in the task of evacuating German nationals along with tourists and travelers from other countries.

Gibson, as a neutral observer, traveled around Belgium (he witnessed and took pictures of the sack of Louvain), made his way through battle lines, and was sent on relief-related missions to Great Britain. He was thus present in the London office of American Ambassador Walter Hines Page when Page and two representatives of Belgium persuaded Herbert Hoover to set aside his profitable engineering activities to organize food relief for occupied Belgium. That led to the creation of the Commission for Relief in Belgium (CRB), which would shortly begin to ship food not only to Belgium but also to the occupied parts of northern France. The CRB ultimately fed 9.5 million people.

Gibson worked closely with Hoover and the CRB and showed great admiration for Hoover's talents as an organizer. On June 20, 1915, Gibson and the CRB staffer (later Ambassador) Gilchrist B. Stockton made the following entry in Gibson's house book: "Gilchrist B. Stockton and Hugh Gibson hereby found the Hoover for President Club for the purpose of sending Herbert Hoover to the White House within a maximum period of fifteen years. To this end Gilchrist Stockton undertakes to vote Republican if necessary. The Club is limited to two – count them, T-W-O – members, any others claiming to be original Hoover men are impostors and probably dangerous ones."

Gibson acquired considerable notoriety in August 1915 as a result of his efforts to save the British nurse Edith Cavell, who had been sentenced to death for having, by her own admission, helped some 200 British soldiers to escape from Belgium and return to their regiments in England. Gibson and the Spanish minister, Rodrigo de Saavedra y Vinent, 2nd Marques de Villalobar, sought in vain to convince the German High Command that "this murder would stir all civilized countries with horror and disgust".

Gibson was assigned to the American Embassy in London in May 1916. In December, he reportedly became engaged to be married to the British prime minister's 19-year-old daughter, Elizabeth Asquith. However, Gibson plausibly denied any such engagement in letters to his mother. Gibson was then assigned to the State Department in Washington. He subsequently served in various positions both in Washington and in Paris, notably, in 1918 with the American Relief Administration, Hoover's organization for the relief and reconstruction of Europe after the Armistice. He was an American member of the first Inter-Allied Mission to visit the countries of the old Austro-Hungarian Empire after the signature of the Austrian armistice. In 1919, Woodrow Wilson appointed him minister plenipotentiary in the newly restored Poland. He served in the Second Polish Republic during the first five years of Polish independence.

== "A blithe spirit" ==
One of Gibson's most distinctive character traits should surely be recorded here because it always struck and ingratiated those who worked with him and often showed up in his correspondence and even in his official reports. In the words of Huntington Wilson, Assistant Secretary of State, for whom Gibson worked in 1911, Gibson was "a blithe spirit (who) radiated a whimsical humor that was just what the department, too dour in its application of business, needed." That humor never seemed to compromise his professionalism or his effectiveness but served rather to make things easier during tense situations.

It showed up, for instance, on June 28, 1927, at a tense moment of the Naval Disarmament Conference. There was some anxiety about the Japanese delegation's response to British demands, and Gibson found it desirable to break up the meeting to avoid further tension.

As reported by Hugh Wilson, who was in on the plot, Gibson, together with the members of his delegation strode into the room with solemn faces and addressed the press "somewhat as follows" that "I have a very serious communication to make to you today" (all the journalists begin taking notes). The American delegation finds itself in a critical situation and I want to appeal to the American correspondents for that same backing and sympathy which they have heretofore shown us so abundantly. I want to appeal to the sense of fair play and justice of the correspondents of other nations who are here present. (You could have heard a pin drop.) I have just received from the Japanese Delegation a proposal. It is perhaps somewhat difficult to explain so I think that the best course for me to pursue is to treat you with the utmost frankness and to read the proposal to you.

Gibson thereupon pulled a letter out of his pocket that read as follows:

"In the interest of that moral harmony which should precede physical disarmament and in order to promote better understanding among our two nations, the Japanese press and delegation here in Geneva have organized a baseball team and submit to your Excellency a challenge for a game to be played between this team and any team which your Excellency may be able to organize among the Americans present. The size of ball, length of bat, time and place of game to be subject to technical negotiations. Respectfully, Hanishida Ito."

"There was a gasp of amazement," Hugh Wilson recalled, "followed by a roar which rocked the building. The meeting turned into a farce." As a British delegate subsequently declared, "Never in any conference, had he seen the correspondents so properly had." The game was played on July 27 in which Japanese won 28 to 8.

Joseph C. Grew remembered the 28-year-old Gibson at the State Department in 1911 as a "crackerjack" and a "wild Indian" and reminisced in his memoirs about the "Saturday afternoon after Wilson had left, (when he saw Gibson) playing chimes on all the bell buttons which called all of the chiefs of bureaus to the Secretary of State's room, and then fleeing down the corridor of that sedate old Department like an Apache on the war trail."

Confirming that reputation, Gibson's colleagues at the Commission for Relief in Belgium published a 163-page volume shortly after he had died that briefly summed up his life work and gathered together quotes gleaned from his correspondence and reminiscences sent in by friends and colleagues illustrating that aspect of his personality (see note 8).

== Poland ==
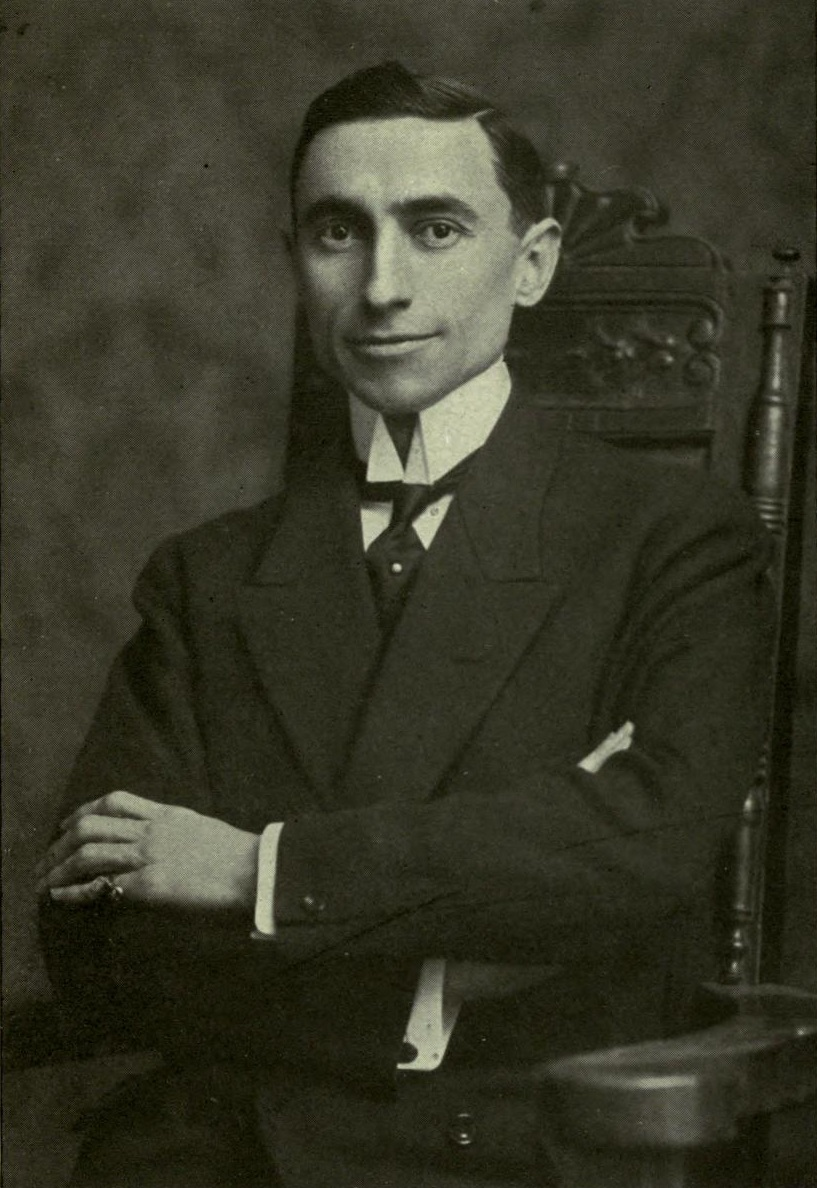
Hugh S. Gibson as he appeared at the time of his 1919 posting as US Ambassador to Poland.

When Gibson reached Warsaw in the spring of 1919, the country was far from being in full control of its territory. Poland, which had been freed from the domination of the three partitioning powers only some months earlier, still had no definite borders, which would not be defined until 1923. Its economy was in a shambles, and its administration, often oppressively run by these former powers (Prussia, Russia, and Austria) over the past 123 years, had fallen apart. National policy, torn between conflicting political parties, remained unsettled. The new and still fragile government was barely finding its bearings when the Polish-Soviet War broke out in February 1919.

Despite all of the handicaps, under the guidance of Józef Piłsudski, the chief of state, and Ignacy Jan Paderewski, the prime minister who represented Poland at the Paris Peace Conference, the Poles quickly organized an army that defeated the Bolsheviks, established a government of national unity, and in spite of all the domestic strife did not fall prey to a revolution contrary to Hungary.

The situation in Central Europe remained highly volatile. Despite its recent defeat, Germany, just west of Poland, remained unoccupied, was still master of its own house, and remained technically at war with Poland. Meanwhile, Bolshevik Russia, to the east, was in the throes of a merciless civil war involving the Poles in Ukraine and Lithuania, both of which had been part of Poland.

In view of the disquieting context, the top priority of the American government was the containment of war and civil unrest and Gibson, with that in mind, urged upon his superiors in the State Department that it was in the national interest to favor the establishment of a strong Poland, which could ensure the stability of Europe, and notably, in view of current instability of Russia, to serve as "a bulwark against Bolshevism."

In the midst of those emergencies, however, the Legation was desperately understaffed. Gibson and his three colleagues were supposed to give full assistance to the new Polish government as it strove to avert famine, revive its industry, reduce unemployment, appease ethnic tensions, define its borders, and put its ruined house in order. Meanwhile, the Legation was required to take care of thousands of Polish Jews, who were applying for visas to immigrate to the United States. The Legation, as it strove to cope with all this, had only three clerks, one of whom, Gibson wrote was a young lady with a "very slight idea of the English language gained in Russia." In the midst of the turmoil, Gibson was expected to send in regular, perceptive reports on conditions in Poland and in neighboring Russia. The Legation was seriously overextended, and some two months later, Gibson complained that "we are all about to break down" and declared that if appropriations for more clerical staff were not quickly made, he would have to close the Chancery or send all his staff to the hospital to recover from overwork.

That goes a long way to explaining why Gibson's investigations on excesses against Polish Jews could be dealt with only rather briefly and why Gibson was eager to have a commission sent over to investigate them more fully.

== Jewish Question ==
Poland was populated by six different minorities, including 14% of Jews, and reports of pogroms, mostly in former Imperial Russian territory, were beginning to hit the front pages of American papers. Shortly after his arrival, Gibson was instructed to investigate. In June 1919, he and Dr. Boris D. Bogen, general director of European relief operations of the American Jewish Joint Distribution Committee (JDC), and/or members of the Legation staff, traveled to several Polish cities (including Wilno, Lwów, Częstochowa, Kraków, and Pinsk), where such events had reportedly occurred.

One observation made by Gibson and Bogen in the course of their investigation in Wilno (now Vilnius, Lithuania) cast reasonable doubt on the New York Times account of May 27, 1919. It had been stated that three members of the Jewish community Rubenstein, Schabe and Jaffe, the last being a reputed writer, had been abducted, beaten, and tortured. However, when the visitors asked representatives of the Jewish community about their condition, they were promptly summoned and denied that they had beaten or tortured.

As Gibson's correspondence and his reports reveal, his first concerns in the course of his inquiry were separating fact from rumor and from willful disinformation emanating from Russian or German sources; determining whether the Polish government could in any way be held responsible for any of the acts, which would call for diplomatic action by the American government; and evaluating the risks of their recurrence.

In due course, Gibson and his team concluded that many of the newspaper accounts had been inflated or even based on hearsay and/or confabulation. As it turned out, certain stories reported in the American press appeared to have been planted initially either by a Soviet agency working from Sweden or by its German counterpart, based in Kovno, Lithuania, which was still under German occupation. That was entirely plausible since both countries feared the rise of a new and potentially-powerful state on their borders and were eager to discredit it in the sight of participants to the Paris Peace Conference.

Still, as would appear shortly thereafter, a number of acts of violence against Jews had indeed occurred in between 200 and 300 instances, according to Henry Morgenthau Sr.'s report.

In Gibson's view, however, not all of these acts could be construed as anti-Semitic in intent since some had occurred on the volatile frontline of the Soviet-Polish War, and a number of Jews had rightly or wrongly been perceived as snipers or sympathizers of the Bolsheviks. Other incidents occurred during the course of food riots (as in Częstochowa), and it appears that an even larger number of Christian shops had also been ransacked. Finally, a number of cases of violence against Jews were imputable to young (mainly American) soldiers of the Haller Army over which the Polish government had no direct control, but the military authorities in due course meted out punishment on the soldiers concerned.

Gibson believed that Polish anti-Semitism had largely been a product of the Imperial regimes, which "aroused and maintained public feeling against the Jews as part of the system of dominating through internal dissension." The regimes had been overthrown, to be sure, but had left a poisoned inheritance of mutual resentment and hatred.

Whatever the case, prominent American Zionists took both notice and action. The Zionists then represented only a small percentage of American Jews, but remembering, like all other Jews stemming from Central Europe, the 19th-century history of pogroms in areas controlled by Russia and assuming that the recent incidents represented a deliberate attempt to reduce the Jewish population of Poland through massacre, they were determined to hold the fledgling (barely two months old) Polish state responsible. That explained their presence in Paris during the Peace Conference and the fact that Felix Frankfurter (later Associate Justice of the US Supreme Court) wrote to Woodrow Wilson (May 22, 1919) that "the Polish Government must be bullied and browbeaten into quitting its policy of extermination and persecution."

Gibson, who was already well acquainted with the leaders of the Polish government, did not believe that any such sinister policy existed and took this view in his reports. His "skeptical reports to the State Department... came to the attention of [Supreme Court Justice] Louis Brandeis. On 14 June 1919, Gibson was called by Colonel Edward House to a meeting with the justice and his protégé, Felix Frankfurter. Gibson was at a disadvantage because of Brandeis's status but also because his appointment as ambassador to Poland had yet to be confirmed by the US Senate. In Gibson's words, both Zionists opened what the young diplomat later called the "prosecution" by saying "I had done more mischief to the Jewish race than anyone who had lived in the last century. They said... that my reports on the Jewish question had gone around the world and had undone their work.... They finally said that I had stated that the stories of excesses against the Jews were exaggerated, to which I replied that they certainly were and I should think any Jew would be glad to know it."

Neff adds that "Frankfurter claimed that Gibson "had no right to make reports to the department in regard to Jewish matters and should have 'refused' on the ground that I could not possibly learn enough about them to make even general observations." Frankfurter then hinted that if Gibson continued his reports, the Zionists would block his confirmation as ambassador to Poland by the Senate."

A letter that Gibson wrote to his mother on June 27, 1919, three days after his meeting with Brandeis and Frankfurter, casts an interesting light on own his state of mind at the time: "I went down to the Relief Administration where I had two solid hours with Lewis Strauss [Herbert Hoover's private secretary] on the Jewish question. I find that most of the people are overwrought and have reached that stage where they unconsciously want to believe every exaggerated yarn about excesses against the Jews. They take it as prejudice if you question any story no matter whether they know where it comes from or not, so long as it makes out a case against the Poles and shows that the Jews are suffering. They are in a bad situation but you can't help the patient by treating him for an ailment he does not suffer from. I think that at the end of two hours I had convinced Lewis that I was not a Jew baiter and that I really want to help even if not in his simple way which consists chiefly in blackguarding the Polish Government for everything to be found in any report, no matter what its source, its foundation or its inspiration. I can see that there will be a tremendous amount of patient talking to be done among the American Jews before they will be willing to abandon the idea of curing all the ills of their people by one blast at the Polish Government. They have got to make up their minds to work untiringly with the Government and not against it, and if they do I am convinced they can accomplish great things."

As for the somewhat surprising allegation that Gibson's report had "undone their work for months" it clearly pointed to the fact that the Zionists, who had indeed been working hard to impose a Minorities Treaty on Poland, needed as many accounts of atrocities against Jews as could be found to further their cause. Although the Minorities Treaty was indeed signed a few days after the confrontation, Gibson's report ran counter to their interests.

Louis Marshall, President of the American Jewish Committee, was also present in Paris, also favored dealing sternly with the Polish government, and took the position that Gibson was willfully minimizing the whole matter to protect Poland. The incendiary campaign that he launched against the American Envoy in Poland in the American press on June 14, 1919, was carried by many papers around the country and made a powerful and longlasting impression on American public opinion.

As the foregoing suggests, Gibson believed that a positive approach and strong encouragement towards the establishment of rule of law and equality for all citizens would be more helpful to Poland and to the stability of Eastern Europe than the sort of "bullying and browbeating" recommended by Frankfurter and other Zionist leaders in America

In fact, Zionist policy baffled him initially, and he expressed perplexity at the goals they were pursuing. He considered that their prime interest should be to ensure the immediate security of Polish Jews. At times, the Zionists infuriated him because he was convinced that the anti-Polish campaign then under way in the American press was actually putting Polish Jews at risk, mainly because all of the hostile assertions were promptly reported in the Polish and Jewish press, where they could only inflame an already-volatile situation and foster further violence and disorder.

=== Morgenthau Mission ===
The Zionists had their agenda and continued to challenge Gibson's conclusions, but a number of equally-prominent American Jews disagreed with them and included Ambassador Abram I. Elkus, Dr. Boris D. Bogen, who had already investigated the matter with Gibson, and Henry Morgenthau, Sr., a former U.S. ambassador to Turkey (and a member of an anti-Zionist committee at the Paris Peace Peace Conference), whom President Woodrow Wilson later appointed to head a commission of inquiry that went to Poland and remained there from July 13 to September 13, 1919, to investigate the allegations, had conclusions regarding official Polish implication that differed little from Gibson's own.

In the Morgenthau Report, anti-Semitic activities in Poland were partly a result of the unsettled condition of the country. During his two-month 2500-mile journey through Poland, Morgenthau visited the eight cities in which the more important excesses had occurred: Kielce, November 11, 1918; Lemberg (Lwow/Lviv); Nov. 21–23, 1918, Pinsk, April 5, 1919; Lida, April 17, 1919; Wilno (Vilnius), April 19–21, 1919, Kolbussowa; May 7, 1919; Częstochowa, May 27, 1919; and Minsk, August 8, 1919. He gathered more information than was possible by Gibson and his staff during their brief visits, but his conclusions did not satisfy the Zionist wing, which declared the report a "whitewash" of the Polish government and so the debate raged on. Gibson's handling of the matter is comprehensively dealt with by Professor Andrzej Kapiszewski, who takes note of Gibson's assumption that Polish Jews should "reform themselves, become "team players" and blend in with their country's citizens, just like the assimilated Jews in the West.

Kapiszewski (1991) also notes that Gibson "was much involved in relief efforts for the entire population, not for the Jews in particular. He was also not fearful of the future of Polish-Jewish relations as he believed that the antagonism between the two communities was a legacy of the politics of the partitioning powers, Russia in particular, which would diminish when the country achieved a stage of normalcy." (p. 50)

Gibson in 1954 would point out in a conversation with his son how regrettable it was that Germany had not been required to subscribe to the same Minorities Treaty that had been imposed on Poland since it might have saved many more lives.

== Persistent allegations ==
Although the Zionist leadership publicly reversed its position on Gibson's qualifications after prolonged discussions with him in Paris, its initial accusations are still upheld by certain American academics who, like Neale Pease, hold that Gibson stood out for his anti-Semitism, or like the historian Carole Fink, who declares that Gibson emphasized the Jews' "social, economic, and ideological transgressions" and described the victims of the pogroms as "exploiters". She also deplores that Gibson expressed the opinion that Jews in Poland ought to "reform themselves" and assimilate into general Polish society.

Other authors take a different view. Donald Neff, for instance, in his account of the controversy, suggests that Gibson was motivated not by any hostility against the Jews but by the need to bring peace and stability to Europe. He also quotes a passage from the letter that Gibson wrote to his colleagues on the day of his confrontation with Brandeis and Frankfurter that voices a suspicion that "the Zionists were trying to accomplish 'a conscienceless and cold-blooded plan to make the condition of the Jews in Poland so bad that they must turn to Zionists for relief.'" The relevant point here is not the speculation touching upon the Zionists' ultimate motives but Gibson's stated concern for the well-being of the Polish Jews.

Andrzej Kapiszewski, the author of the only thorough discussion of the issue that has been published, explicitly distances himself from these allegations. His book includes the full text of a letter that Gibson sent to William Phillips, Assistant Secretary of State, on July 6, 1919, shortly after his meeting with Brandeis and Frankfurter in Paris. He went into the situation of the Jews in some detail and stressed that the present situation could not be understood if one failed to take history into account. He also evoked the "poisoned inheritance of the imperial powers", the last two of which had collapsed merely six months before Gibson himself set foot in Warsaw:

"I did not realize just how far [the old Russian discrimination against the Jews] went until I came here. It was about as cold blooded and fiendish as anything you can imagine... [for, by] barring the Jews from higher education, professions and the army, and keeping them out of 'Holy Russia' [it] forced them into all sorts of crooked work and disreputable means of getting a livelihood. The fault for a great deal of what is happening now should properly be placed on the old Russian Government, but the people is not made up of philosophers, and when a Jew is caught as a food speculator or smuggler or receiver of stolen goods the crowd deals with him without any thought of the family of Romanoff. It is not justice and you sympathize with the Jews.... Everywhere you find the vicious circle which makes the whole problem so baffling."

In the interval, to be sure, Gibson adds that "we have... overthrown the old system with its oppression. The legalized discrimination is gone. But we have not yet established a government with the virtues of the old regime and without its faults. The prejudices and hatreds have survived. For the present all we have done is to release a flood of pent up passion and hatred without establishing any strong authority to maintain even the degree of public order which prevailed before. The result is that while the legal discrimination and inequality have been removed and the Jews stand equal before the law theoretically, they have become a prey to physical violence to a degree that did not exist before.... One of the points which appeared to me to be very important was whether the Polish authorities had tolerated excesses against the Jews and I have taken every opportunity to inquire into this from the Jews themselves."

== Marriage ==
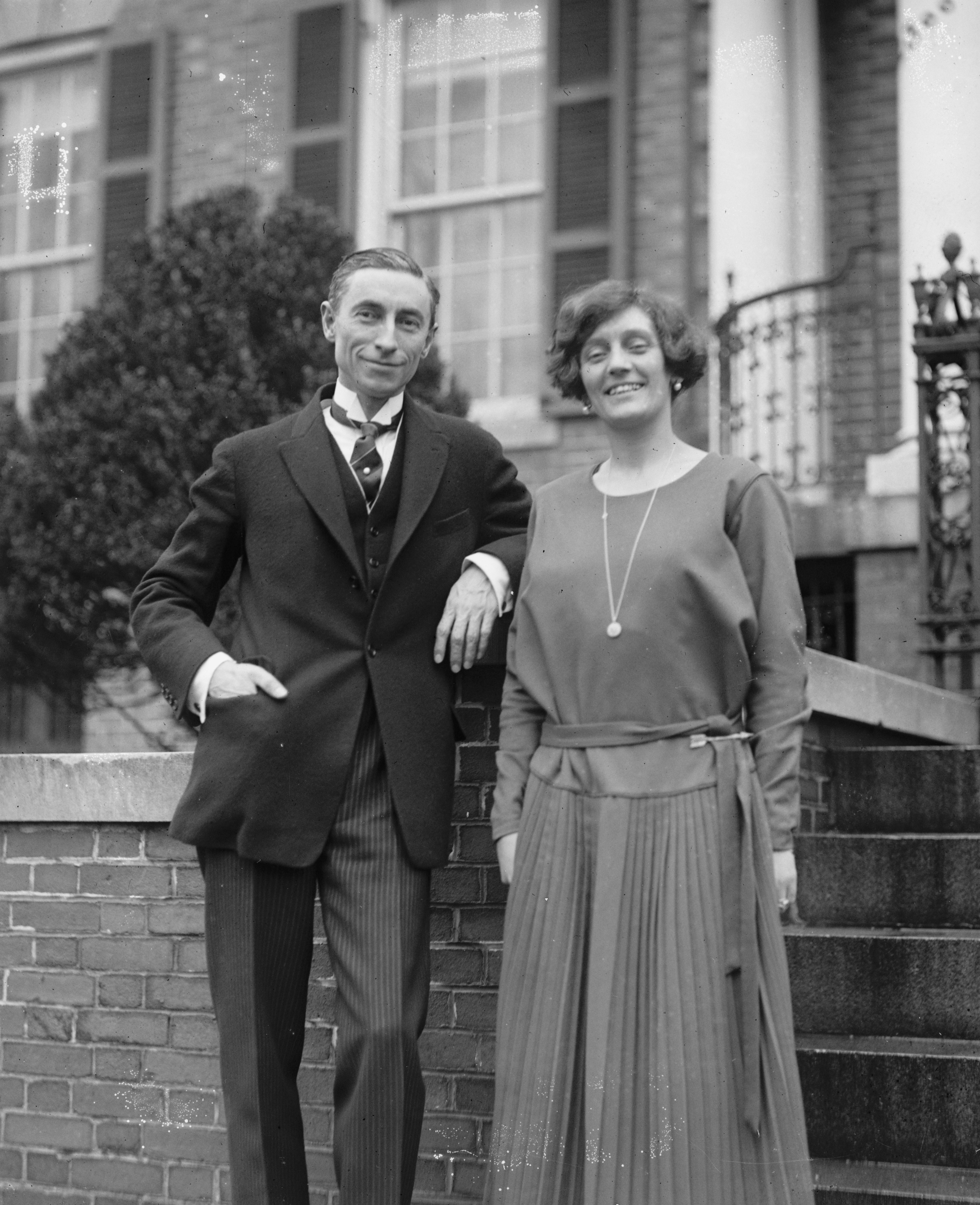
Gibson and his wife in March 1922

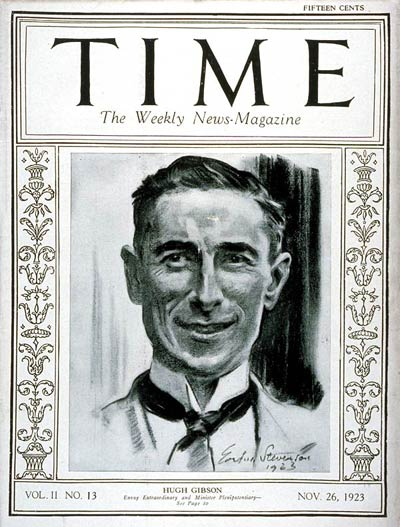
Time cover, November 26, 1923

In February 1922, Gibson married Ynès Reyntiens, the daughter of a prominent Belgian family. Her father, Major Robert Reyntiens, had been aide-de-camp to King Leopold II, and her mother, Anita de Errazu y de Rubio de Tejada, was Spanish. Ynès had gone to boarding school in England. She spoke several languages, loved music and dancing, was an expert horsewoman, and engaged in many athletic activities. In November 1922, Ynès gave birth to their first child, a little girl, who died a few seconds after birth. A second child was born in 1929.

== In Washington ==
In January 1924, Gibson was in Washington to testify on the merits of the Rogers Bill before the House Committee on Foreign Affairs. It proposed to merge the diplomatic and consular services and to create conditions favorable to the maintenance of a competent and professional Foreign Service. Gibson was an active proponent of the establishment of such a body and believed that it could best defend American interests. It was in those circumstances that he described the undesirable elements of the Foreign Service as "the boys with the white spats, the tea drinkers, the cookie pushers" and suggested that they could be replaced by better men, who would be attracted by the more favorable conditions resulting from the passage of the bill. The same year, the Rogers Bill was enacted into law.

Gibson was offered a post as Undersecretary of States in 1920, when he resisted the offer because he felt he could be more useful in Poland, and in 1924, when he declined it because he judged his income inadequate. He was consequently reassigned as minister to Switzerland. In 1927, he returned to Belgium as ambassador. In the interval, in 1925 in a capacity later described as that of "Ambassador-at-Large," he had become involved in a succession of conferences devoted alternately to general disarmament and naval disarmament. The conferences, assembling the major powers of the world, would occupy him for some ten years during which he served most of the time as conference chairman.

Gibson would later declare himself an ardent supporter of the League of Nations and the International Court at least as experiments in preserving the peace. Like many of his generation, he was acutely aware of the destabilizing effects of the Versailles Treaty and deeply concerned by the conduct of French diplomacy, which was animated by an understandable fear but unrealistically sought to ruin and humiliate Germany. That sometimes led them to impose conditions that were of no clear advantage to France but provided ammunition to extremist agitators within Germany itself. Reviewing the situation in 1942 (in The Problems of Lasting Peace, which was co-authored with Herbert Hoover) Gibson pronounced the whole course of French diplomacy in the 1920s and the 1930s, "except in certain intervals of Briand's ascendancy, incredible. We have here the age-old forces of fear and hate doing their suicidal worst." In Gibson's view, France's refusal to re-examine the ruinous load of reparation imposed upon Germany by the Versailles treaty, its initiative in forming an alliance of nations that totally encircled Germany, and its manifest footdragging in matters of disarmament set the stage for World War II by so weakening the democratic regime of German Chancellor Heinrich Brüning that it crumbled before the onslaught of the Nazis in 1933.

However, other factors also contributed to the failure of the disarmament process, as Gibson himself would put it ten years later:

"Through all the years of discussion in Geneva it was demonstrated that the direct approach to the reduction of arms was merely an attempt to deal with the symptoms rather than with the disease.... It soon became clear that no important results were to be achieved through negotiations limited to men and ships and guns. There were various attempts to find other approaches.... these approaches had their merits, but they... ignored a fundamental problem. Over a long period a number of Great Powers had built up a whole system of national life and national economy based on huge military establishments. These had come to be a recognized way of dealing with the problem of unemployment. To begin with, there were large numbers of men absorbed into the military forces. To supplement these were government arsenals with another army of workmen, with a still larger number employed in providing supplies, food, clothing, and transportation. No government living under this system could undertake drastic reduction of armaments without disrupting the whole national economy. We may as well recognize the fact that there can be no more than fragmentary and regional reductions until the nations are prepared to grapple with this fundamental difficulty."

== End of career ==
When Franklin D. Roosevelt was elected president in 1932, Gibson, as was customary, sent in his resignation. Although Gibson's close relationship to Hoover was something of a handicap in the new political context, he was appointed ambassador to Brazil. He was also sent as an observer to the Chaco Peace Conference, which was being held in Buenos Aires. The Gran Chaco was a territory with loosely defined borders that was claimed by Bolivia and Paraguay, and the Chaco War broke out by Bolivia seeking to acquire territory to give the country access to the Paraguay River and thus to the Atlantic Ocean. A treaty was ultimately signed in 1938 that gave most of the disputed land to Paraguay.

Gibson returned as ambassador to Belgium in 1937. In 1938, he was offered the post of ambassador to Germany, but he noted, like in 1924, that he lacked the personal fortune that would have allowed him to maintain a post of that magnitude, and he preferred to resign. In his 1924 testimony before the House Committee on Foreign Affairs, he had compared his own situation to that of an admiral, sent on a trip around the world, "with instructions to call at various ports, entertain the right people and pay for all expenses, including provisions for his ship, out of his own salary". Throughout his career, he had made every effort to modify the situation, which sometimes made it necessary to appoint wealthy men with no diplomatic experience as chiefs of mission in sensitive posts.

After the outbreak of World War II, at the request of former Hoover, Gibson remained in Britain to negotiate authorization for the organization of food relief for the civilian population in territories occupied by German forces. Winston Churchill, who had opposed relief in 1914, remained hostile to the idea in 1940 ("the idea does more credit to heart than to head", he is reported to have said). The British feared that the German authorities would take whatever food was sent in.

Gibson responded to that argument in 1944 by a counterexample. In 1941, he said, the Turkish government had addressed to the British Foreign Office a request for permission to send food to the suffering Greeks. In reply, it received the same objection that had been made to Gibson in 1940–1941. "But the Turkish Government, instead of washing its hands of the Greeks, set us an example of human compassion by notifying the Foreign Office that on a specified date it was sending certain ships designated by name to certain Greek ports. This amounted to forcing the blockade, but it got food to the Greeks. Other Allied Powers decided to participate in the work, and food has been sent uninterruptedly to Greece from that day to this. Our own government has gone clearly on record in writing to defend the Greek operation, maintaining that the food reaches the Greek population, that the Nazi authorities do not take it, and generally advancing in support of Greek relief the very arguments put forward in vain on behalf of the other sufferers among our Allies."

In January 1940, Gibson made several radio broadcasts to alert public opinion to the Nazi menace (Wake up America on NBC). In 1941, he returned to the United States and went into publishing (Doubleday, Doran and Co. Inc.). After the war, published, among other things, the journals of Joseph Goebbels, Galeazzo Ciano, and Ulrich von Hassell.

In March 1946, President Harry S. Truman asked former Hoover to make an on-the-spot assessment of world food resources in order to avert a possible worldwide famine. Gibson and others went with Hoover. In the course of a three-month journey aboard a twin-engined Douglas C-54, they circled the world and stopped off in 44 cities (Gibson kept a highly readable journal of their world tour that is available online by the Hoover Institution. According to the estimate of the expert report, which prompted the President to set up the Relief Mission, 800 million people were then threatened with food shortages. He and his team took stock of all food available worldwide, and coordinated its transfer to those countries where it was needed. In doing so, they arguably averted famines in many parts of the world. A second, three-week journey, The President's Economic Mission to Germany and Austria, undertaken in 1947, took Hoover and his team back to Germany, Austria, and Italy to assess economic conditions in those countries. Returning from the visit, Hoover criticized Henry Morgenthau Jr.'s plan to "pastoralize" Germany. Hoover held that the plan would require eliminating 25 million Germans or moving them out of the country. The plan was ultimately abandoned.

During the last years of his life, Gibson was director of the Intergovernmental Committee for European Migration in Geneva. The organization, mandated to help European governments to identify resettlement countries for the estimated 11 million people uprooted by the war, arranged transport for nearly 1 million migrants during the 1950s. After Gibson's death, former German Chancellor Heinrich Brüning (1930–1932) declared, "He was... one of the greatest diplomatists the USA has had in two generations, but he was too modest for getting publicity for his views."

Gibson died in Geneva on December 12, 1954, and is buried in the cemetery of Genthod, outside that city. A tree was planted and a bronze memorial plaque installed on the lawn outside the United Nations building in Geneva on the centennial of his birth, on August 16, 1983.

Gibson was on the front cover of Time in the November 26, 1923; July 18, 1927; and February 8, 1932, issues.

== Sources ==
Works by Hugh Gibson

- A Diplomatic Diary.
1. English: A Diplomatic Diary (3 sources via HathiTrust). London, New York, Toronto: Hodder and Stoughton. Doubleday, Page and Company. 1917. LCCN 17-29362; OCLC 405884 (all editions).
  1. Via Internet Archive (UC Riverside).
2. français: La Belgique pendant la guerre [Journal From Our Legation in Belgium]. Translated from English by Louis Marie Alexandre d'Ursel (1886–1969). Paris: Librairie Hachette et Compagnie. 1918. BnF 32163562q; LCCN 19-7499; OCLC 1176986156 (all editions).
  1. Via BnF (Bibliothèque nationale de France, département Philosophie, histoire, sciences de l'homme, 8-M-18585).
  2. Via HathiTrust (UCLA).
The contents of this book were first published in the New York Tribune as a continuous daily series of thirty-six installments, appearing without interruption from 4 November 1917 through 9 December 1917 (Vol. 7: issue nos. 25921–25956). The datelines were from Brussels, July 4, 1914, through December 10, 1914. The series was published under the collective title, The Rape of Belgium – A Journal of the American Legation at Belgium – The Diary of Hugh Gibson, Witness. It was copyrighted in 1917 by Doubleday, Page & Company by Otis Fenner Wood (1868–1939), whose father, Fernando Wood (1812–1881), was, twice, Mayor of New York City – from 1855 to 1857 and from 1860 to 1861.
Each installment carried the following subheading (with slight variations):
"The secretary of the American Legation in Belgium, seeing everything, kept a personal diary of Germany's immortal sin. The seal of neutrality is broken, and here is one of the great documents of the war."
The author, Hugh Gibson, served as Secretary of the United States Legation in Brussels from 1914 to 1916, during the early years of the German occupation of Belgium. The United States subsequently elevated its mission in Brussels to the status of an Embassy in 1919.
- Rio, Doubleday Doran, New York, 1937.
- Belgium, Doubleday Doran, New York, 1938.
- The Problems of Lasting Peace, with Herbert Hoover, Doubleday Doran, New York, 1942.
- The Road to Foreign Policy, Doubleday Doran, New York, 1944.
- The Basis of Lasting Peace, with Herbert Hoover, D. van Norstrand Company, Inc., New York, 1945
- Hugh Gibson, 1883–1954, Extracts from his Letters and Anecdotes from his Friends, edited by Perrin C. Galpin, New York, 1956.
- Gibson, Hugh S. (1948). "Editor's Note". Lenin: A Biography. By Shub, David (revised ed.). London: Pelican.

Books and essays about Hugh Gibson or mentioning him

- Jones, Kenneth Paul, ed. U.S. Diplomats in Europe, 1919–41 (ABC-CLIO. 1981) online on Gibson's role in disarmament, pp 75–90..
- Andrzej Kapiszewski, Hugh Gibson and a Controversy over Polish-Jewish Relations after World War I Jagiellonian University, Wydawnictwo i Drukarnia "Secesja", 1991 (ISBN 83-233-0505-6)
- Andrzej Kapiszewski. Conflicts across the Atlantic. Jagiellonian University, Ksiẹgarnia Akademicka, 2004 (ISBN 83-7188-682-9)
- Donald Neff, Fallen Pillars – U.S. Policy towards Palestine and Israel since 1945, Institute for Palestine Studies, Washington D.C.
- Robert D. Schulzinger, The Making of the Diplomatic Mind, Wesleyan University Press, Middletown, CT, 1975
- Ronald R. Swerczek, The Diplomatic Career of Hugh Gibson 1908–1938, Ph. D. dissertation, University of Iowa, 1972.
- Ronald E. Swerczek, 'Hugh Gibson and Disarmament, the Diplomacy of Gradualism', in U.S. Diplomats in Europe, 1919–1941, Edited by Kenneth Paul Jones, ABC-Clio, Santa Barbara, CA,1983.
- Piotr Wandycz, The United States and Poland, Harvard U.Press, 1980
- Martin Weil, A pretty good club. The founding fathers of the U.S. Foreign Service, Norton, New York 1978

Films

- An American in Paris and the Polish Question (Amerikanin w Parizu i Sprawa Polska, TV Polonia 2000), two half-hour documentary films by Stefan Szlachtycz devoted the Hugh Gibson and Michael Gibson families.

Diplomatic posts
Preceded by None	United States Ambassador to Poland; 1919–1924	Succeeded by Alfred J. Pearson
Preceded by William Phillips	United States Ambassador to Belgium; 1927–1933	Succeeded by Dave Hennen Morris
Preceded by Edwin V. Morgan	United States Ambassador to Brazil; 1933–1936	Succeeded by Jefferson Caffery
Preceded by Dave Hennen Morris	United States Ambassador to Belgium; 1937–1938	Succeeded by Joseph E. Davies
Awards and achievements
Preceded by Erich Ludendorff	Cover of Time Magazine; November 26, 1923	Succeeded by Robert M. La Follette, Sr.
