= List of ambassadors of the United States to Poland =

Ambassador of the United States to Poland
- Ambasador Stanów Zjednoczonych w Polsce
- Seal of the United States Department of State

- Flag of a United States ambassador

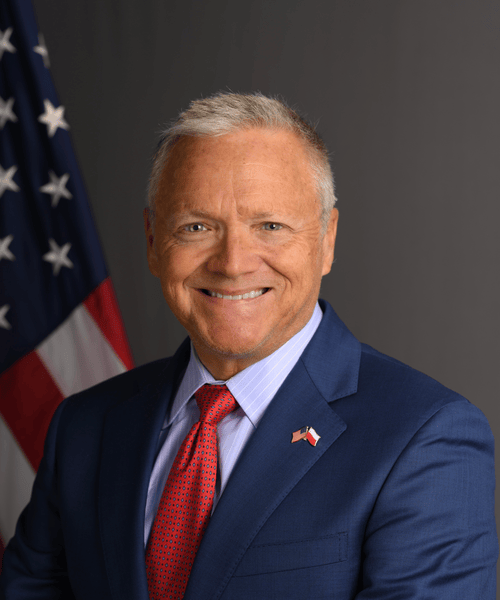
- Incumbent; Tom Rose since November 6, 2025
- Nominator: The president of the United States
- Appointer: The president; with Senate advice and consent
- Inaugural holder: Hugh S. Gibson as Envoy Extraordinary and Minister Plenipotentiary
- Formation: April 16, 1919
- Website: U.S. Embassy - Warsaw

The history of ambassadors of the United States to Poland began in 1919.

Until the end of World War I, Poland had been partitioned between Russia, Germany, and Austria-Hungary. After the war and the collapse of the empires, Poland became an independent republic in 1918.

The United States recognized the Second Polish Republic and established diplomatic relations. The first U.S. Minister to Poland was Hugh S. Gibson, appointed in 1919.

Diplomatic relations were maintained throughout the years of World War II with the government-in-exile of Poland resident in London.

The U.S. Embassy in Poland is located in Warsaw.

== Ambassadors ==
Name	Title	Appointed	Presented credentials	Mission ended	Notes
Hugh S. Gibson – Career FSO	Envoy Extraordinary and Minister Plenipotentiary	April 16, 1919	May 2, 1919	May 3, 1924	
Alfred J. Pearson – Political appointee	Envoy Extraordinary and Minister Plenipotentiary	April 2, 1924	June 26, 1924	August 18, 1925	
John B. Stetson Jr. – Political appointee	Envoy Extraordinary and Minister Plenipotentiary	July 3, 1925	August 29, 1925	August 29, 1929	From 1930 onward, the U.S. envoy to Poland had the rank of ambassador.
John N. Willys – Political appointee	Ambassador Extraordinary and Plenipotentiary	March 8, 1930	May 24, 1930	May 30, 1932	
Ferdinand Lammot "Mot" Belin – Career FSO	Ambassador Extraordinary and Plenipotentiary	November 2, 1932	December 13, 1932	Recess appointment expired, March 4, 1933	President Roosevelt nominated James Michael Curley for the post in 1933 but withdrew the nomination before the Senate acted upon it.
John Cudahy – Political appointee	Ambassador Extraordinary and Plenipotentiary	June 13, 1933	September 6, 1933	April 23, 1937	
Anthony Joseph Drexel Biddle Jr. (Note: Biddle was also commissioned to the governments-in-exile of Belgium, Czechoslovakia, Greece, Luxembourg, the Netherlands, Norway, and Yugoslavia.) – Political appointee	Ambassador Extraordinary and Plenipotentiary	May 4, 1937	June 2, 1937	Left London December 1, 1943	Biddle was the U.S. ambassador in Warsaw in September 1939 when Germany invaded Poland, which action set off World War II. The government of Poland evacuated the country, first to France (September 1939–June 1940) and later to England. Rudolf E. Schoenfeld opened the U.S. embassy near the government of Poland established in England, making his initial call as Chargé d'Affaires ad interim on September 21, 1940. Biddle followed the government-in-exile to London, where he arrived on March 14, 1941, and continued as ambassador through 1943.
The U.S. embassy in London to the government-in-exile of Poland was terminated on July 5, 1945. Rudolf E. Schoenfeld was still serving as Chargé d'Affaires ad interim when United States withdrew the recognition of the Polish government in exile, recognizing the new communist government, and the mission in London was closed.
Arthur Bliss Lane – Career FSO	Ambassador Extraordinary and Plenipotentiary	September 21, 1944	August 4, 1945	February 24, 1947	The U.S. Embassy in Warsaw was reestablished on July 5, 1945
Stanton Griffis – Political appointee	Ambassador Extraordinary and Plenipotentiary	May 15, 1947	July 9, 1947	April 21, 1948	
Waldemar J. Gallman – Career FSO	Ambassador Extraordinary and Plenipotentiary	July 7, 1948	October 15, 1948	July 8, 1950	
Joseph Flack – Career FSO	Ambassador Extraordinary and Plenipotentiary	September 20, 1950	November 30, 1950	Left Poland, April 22, 1955	
Joseph E. Jacobs – Career FSO	Ambassador Extraordinary and Plenipotentiary	April 1, 1955	May 23, 1955	July 23, 1957	
Jacob D. Beam – Career FSO	Ambassador Extraordinary and Plenipotentiary	June 26, 1957	August 9, 1957	November 30, 1961	
John M. Cabot – Career FSO	Ambassador Extraordinary and Plenipotentiary	January 30, 1962	March 2, 1962	September 24, 1965	
John A. Gronouski – Political appointee	Ambassador Extraordinary and Plenipotentiary	September 11, 1965	December 7, 1965	May 26, 1968	
Walter J. Stoessel Jr. – Career FSO	Ambassador Extraordinary and Plenipotentiary	July 24, 1968	September 12, 1968	August 5, 1972	
Richard T. Davies – Career FSO	Ambassador Extraordinary and Plenipotentiary	December 2, 1972	January 5, 1973	February 5, 1978	
William E. Schaufele Jr. – Career FSO	Ambassador Extraordinary and Plenipotentiary	February 3, 1978	March 30, 1978	September 11, 1980	
Francis J. Meehan – Career FSO	Ambassador Extraordinary and Plenipotentiary	October 2, 1980	October 27, 1980	February 11, 1983	The following officers served as Chargé d'Affaires ad interim: Herbert E. Wilgis Jr. (February–July 1983); and John R. Davis Jr. (September 1983–January 1987). Davis was appointed as Chargé d'Affaires on January 9, 1987 and subsequently appointed as ambassador.
John R. Davis Jr. – Career FSO	Ambassador Extraordinary and Plenipotentiary	February 5, 1988	March 17, 1988	July 20, 1990	
Thomas W. Simons Jr. – Career FSO	Ambassador Extraordinary and Plenipotentiary	August 6, 1990	September 11, 1990	April 28, 1993	
Nicholas Andrew Rey – Political appointee	Ambassador Extraordinary and Plenipotentiary	November 22, 1993	December 21, 1993	October 25, 1997	
Daniel Fried – Career FSO	Ambassador Extraordinary and Plenipotentiary	November 10, 1997	November 27, 1997	May 6, 2000	
Christopher R. Hill – Career FSO	Ambassador Extraordinary and Plenipotentiary	May 31, 2000	July 27, 2000	April 14, 2004	
Victor Henderson Ashe – Political appointee	Ambassador Extraordinary and Plenipotentiary	May 26, 2004	August 17, 2004	September 26, 2009	
Lee A. Feinstein – Political appointee	Ambassador Extraordinary and Plenipotentiary	September 28, 2009	October 20, 2009	October 28, 2012	
Stephen Mull – Career FSO	Ambassador Extraordinary and Plenipotentiary	October 24, 2012	November 8, 2012	August 29, 2015	
Paul W. Jones – Career FSO	Ambassador Extraordinary and Plenipotentiary	June 8, 2015	September 24, 2015	July 28, 2018	
Georgette Mosbacher – Political appointee	Ambassador Extraordinary and Plenipotentiary	February 14, 2018	September 6, 2018	January 20, 2021	
Mark Brzezinski – Political appointee	Ambassador Extraordinary and Plenipotentiary	December 18, 2021	February 22, 2022	January 20, 2025	
Daniel Lawton – Career FSO	Chargé d'affaires ad interim	January 20, 2025		August 7, 2025	
Stephanie E. Holmes – Career FSO	Chargé d'affaires ad interim	August 7, 2025		October 29, 2025	
Tom Rose – Political appointee	Ambassador Extraordinary and Plenipotentiary	October 7, 2025	November 6, 2025	Present	

== See also ==
- Poland – United States relations
- Foreign relations of Poland
- Ambassadors of the United States
