= Charles L. Kagey =

American lawyer and diplomat

Charles Lemuel Kagey
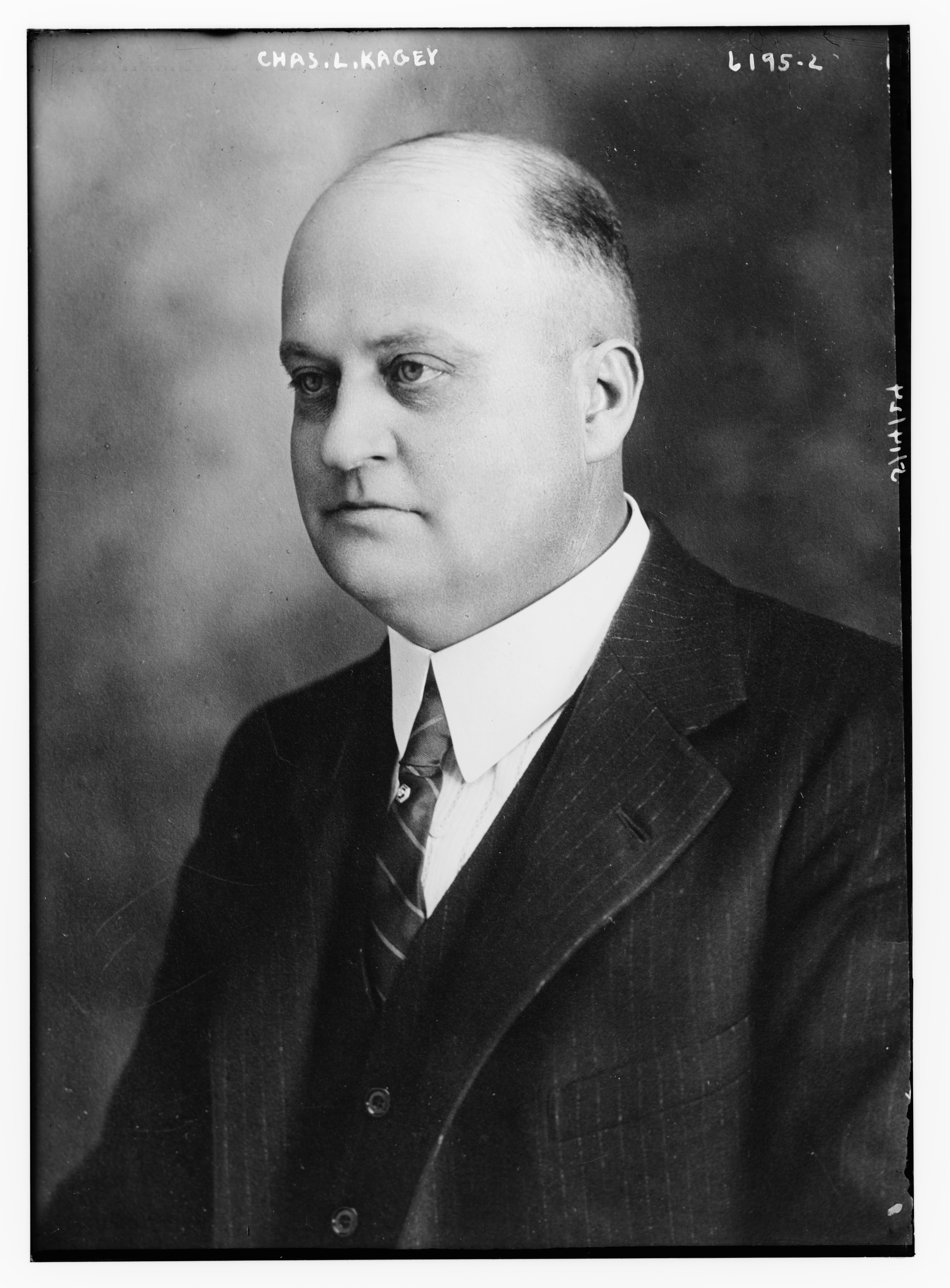

United States Minister to Finland
- In office October 8, 1921 – March 24, 1925
- President: Warren G. Harding; Calvin Coolidge
- Preceded by: Alexander R. Magruder
- Succeeded by: Alfred J. Pearson

Personal details
- Born: December 22, 1876; Rude's Hill, Virginia, U.S.
- Died: October 13, 1941 (aged 64); Wichita, Kansas, U.S.

Charles Lemuel Kagey (December 22, 1876 – October 13, 1941) was an American lawyer and diplomat from Kansas.

== Life ==
Kagey was born on December 22, 1876, in the Kagey homestead near Rude's Hill, Virginia, on the Shenandoah River. He was the son of John Henry Kagey and Emma Fultz. John was a farmer who received a commission in the Confederate Army during the American Civil War.

Kagey attended the Polytechnic Institute in New Market. He then went to the University of Virginia in Charlottesville, graduating from there with a law degree in 1898. He then moved to Kansas and began practicing law in Hays City. In 1899, he was appointed county attorney of Logan County. He then spent two years in Russell Springs. In 1901, he moved to Beloit and began practicing law there. In 1904, he formed the law firm Kagey & Anderson, which practiced all over the state, served as the local attorneys for Union Pacific Railroad and Missouri Pacific Railroad, and was general counsel for the Scott City Northern Railway Company. He was an active member of the Republican Party and was considered as a possible Republican candidate for Kansas Attorney General in the 1910 election but he declined to be a candidate.

In 1921, President Harding nominated Kagey as American Minister to Finland. He resigned as Minister in 1925 and returned to Beloit. In 1931, he moved to Wichita and became a member of the law firm Kagey, Black & Kagey.

In 1901, Kagey married Phebe M. Wanzer of Russell Springs. They had one son, Lloyd M. He was vice-president of the American Bar Association, president of the Kansas Bar Association, and a director of the Kansas Historical Society. He was a member of the Academy of Political Science, the National Geographic Society, the American Society for the Judicial Settlement of International Disputes, the Knights of Pythias, the Independent Order of Odd Fellows, the Elks, the Freemasons, the Knights Templar, and the Shriners.

Kagey died on October 13, 1941, in Wichita.
