= Dunbar (CDP), Wisconsin =

Census-designated place in Wisconsin, United States

Dunbar, Wisconsin
- Census-designated place
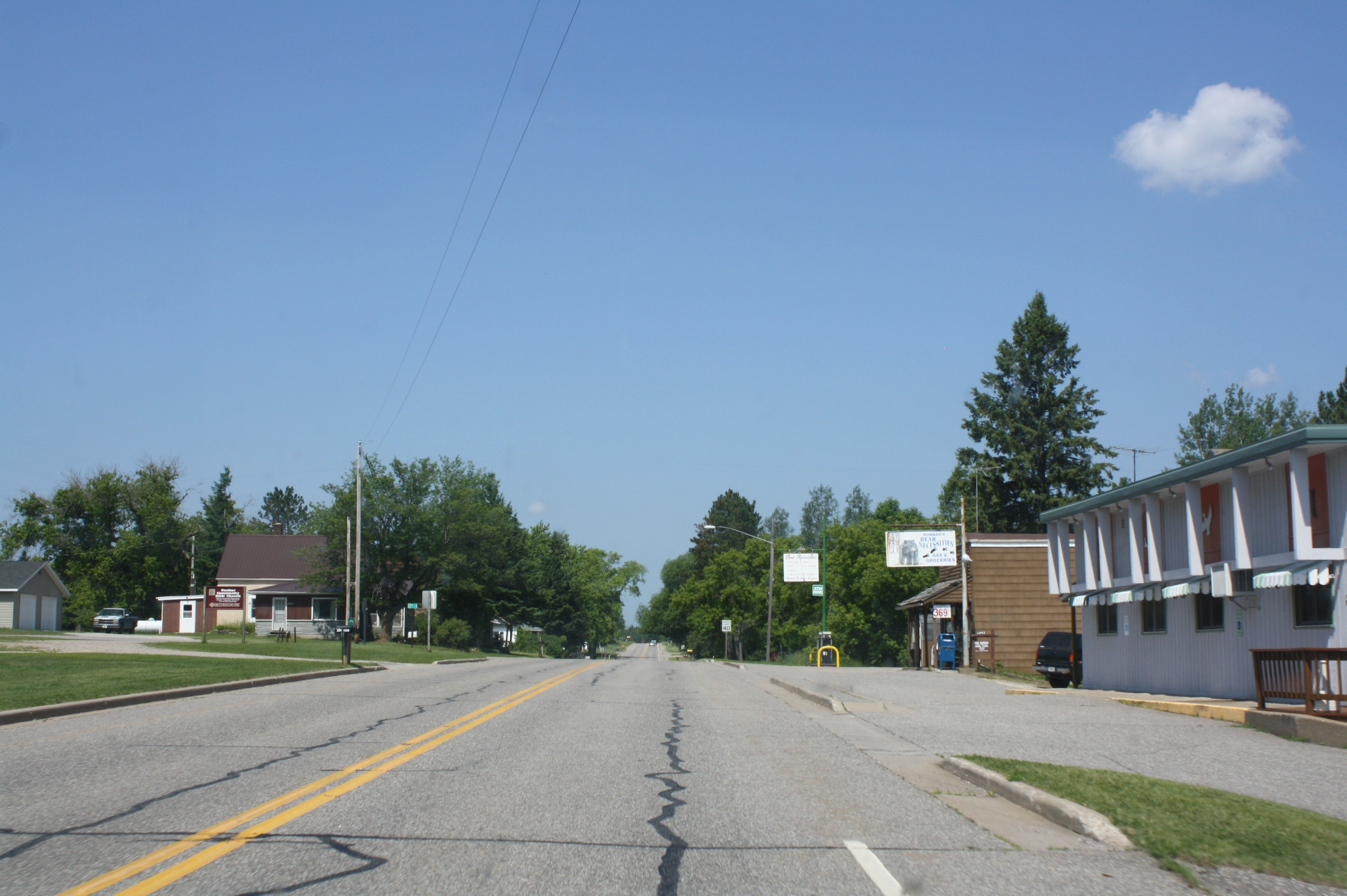
- Looking west in downtown Dunbar on US8

- Location within Wisconsin
- Coordinates: 45°39′03″N 88°10′17″W
- Country: United States
- State: Wisconsin
- County: Marinette

Area
  - Total: 1.066 sq mi (2.76 km^{2})
  - Land: 1.064 sq mi (2.76 km^{2})
  - Water: 0.002 sq mi (0.0052 km^{2})
- Elevation: 1,306 ft (398 m)

Population (2020)
  - Total: 61
  - Density: 57/sq mi (22/km^{2})
- Time zone: UTC-6 (Central (CST))
  - Summer (DST): UTC-5 (CDT)
- ZIP code: 54119
- Area codes: 715 & 534
- GNIS feature ID: 1564171

Dunbar is a census-designated place in the town of Dunbar, Marinette County, Wisconsin, United States. Dunbar is located on U.S. Route 8, 12 miles (19 km) southwest of Niagara. Dunbar has a post office with ZIP code 54119. As of the 2020 census, its population is 61.

Historical population
Census	Pop.	Note	%±
2010	50		—
2020	61		22.0%
U.S. Decennial Census

== Images ==
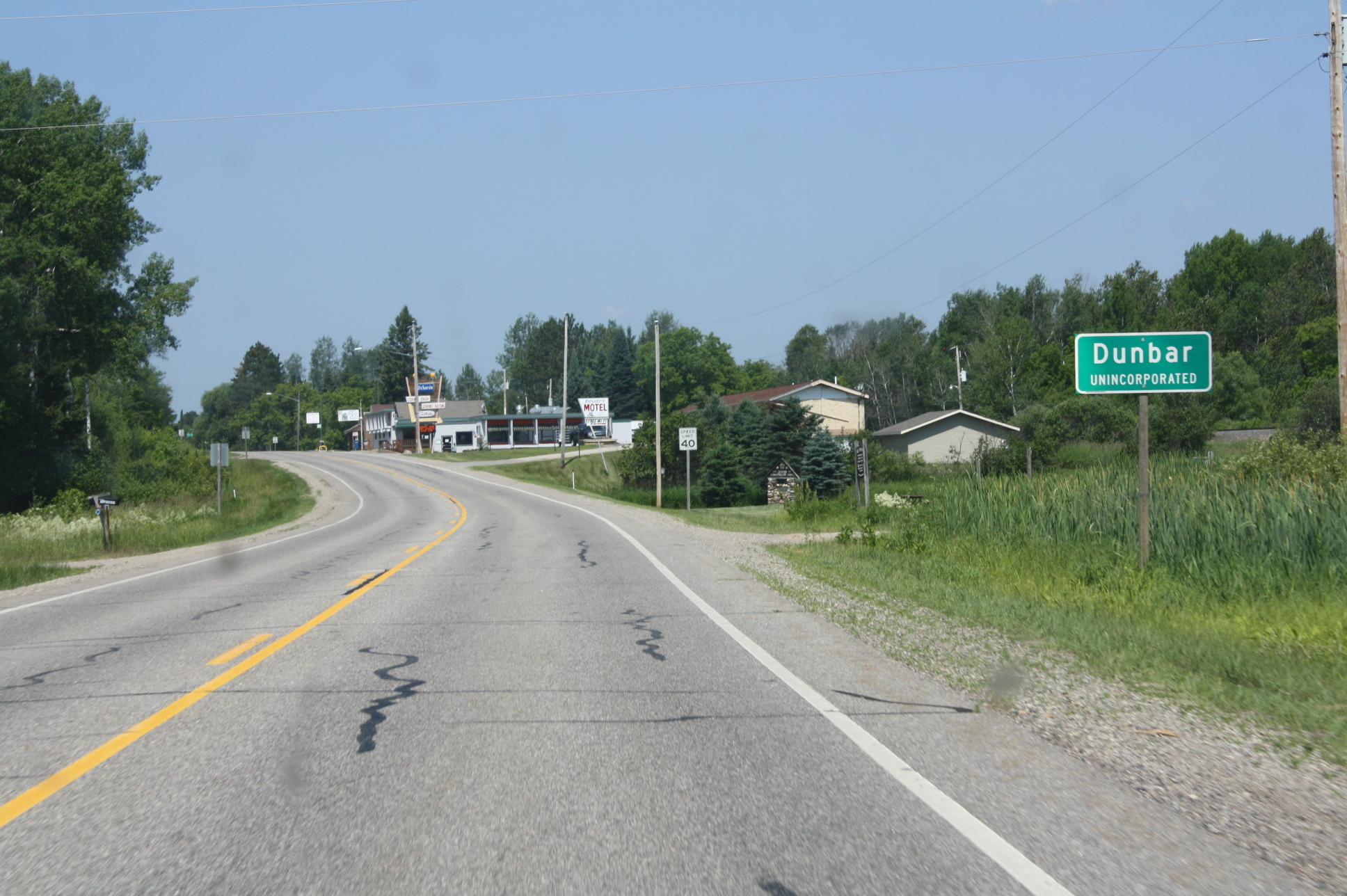
Sign on US8

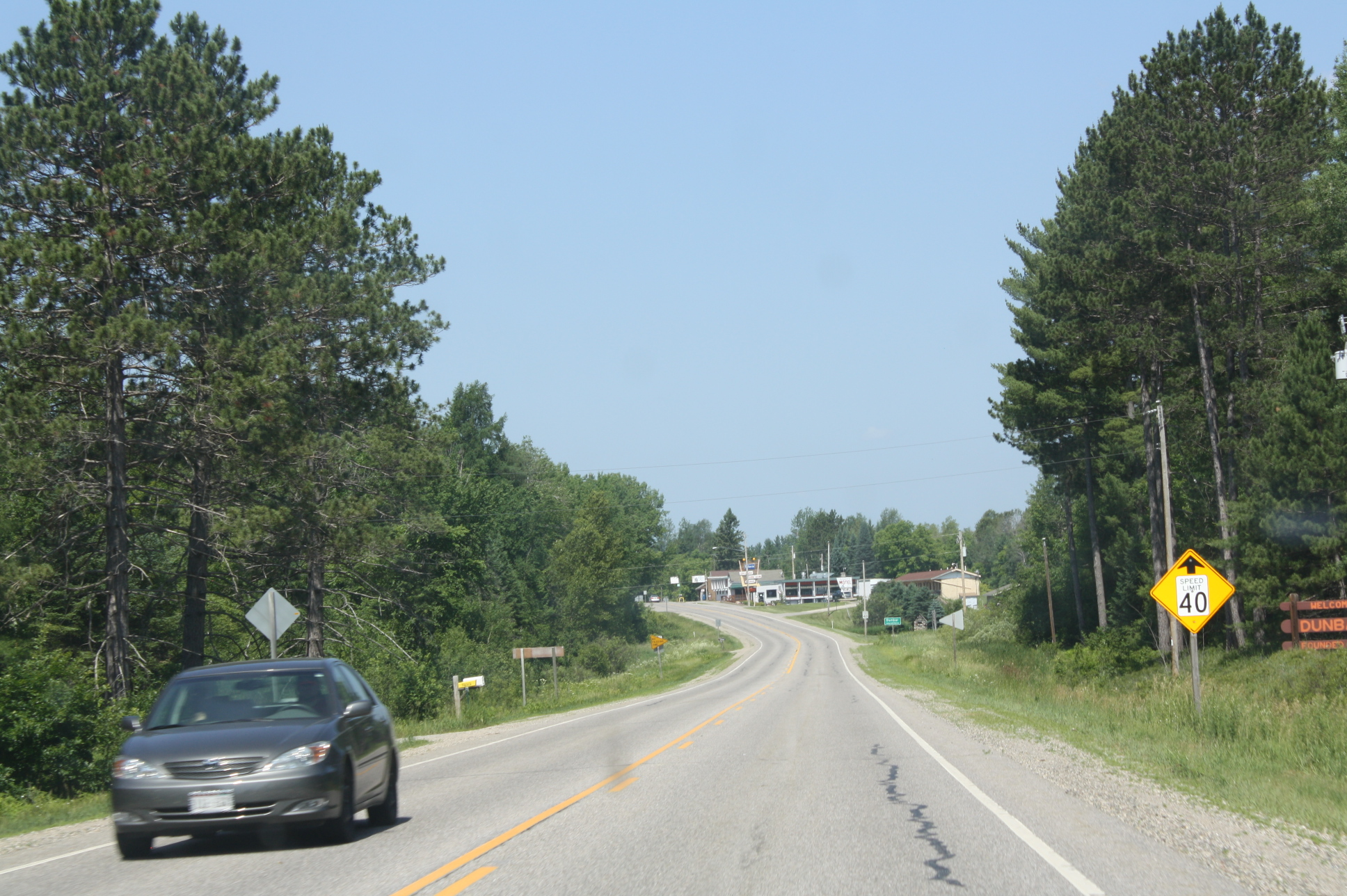
Panorama

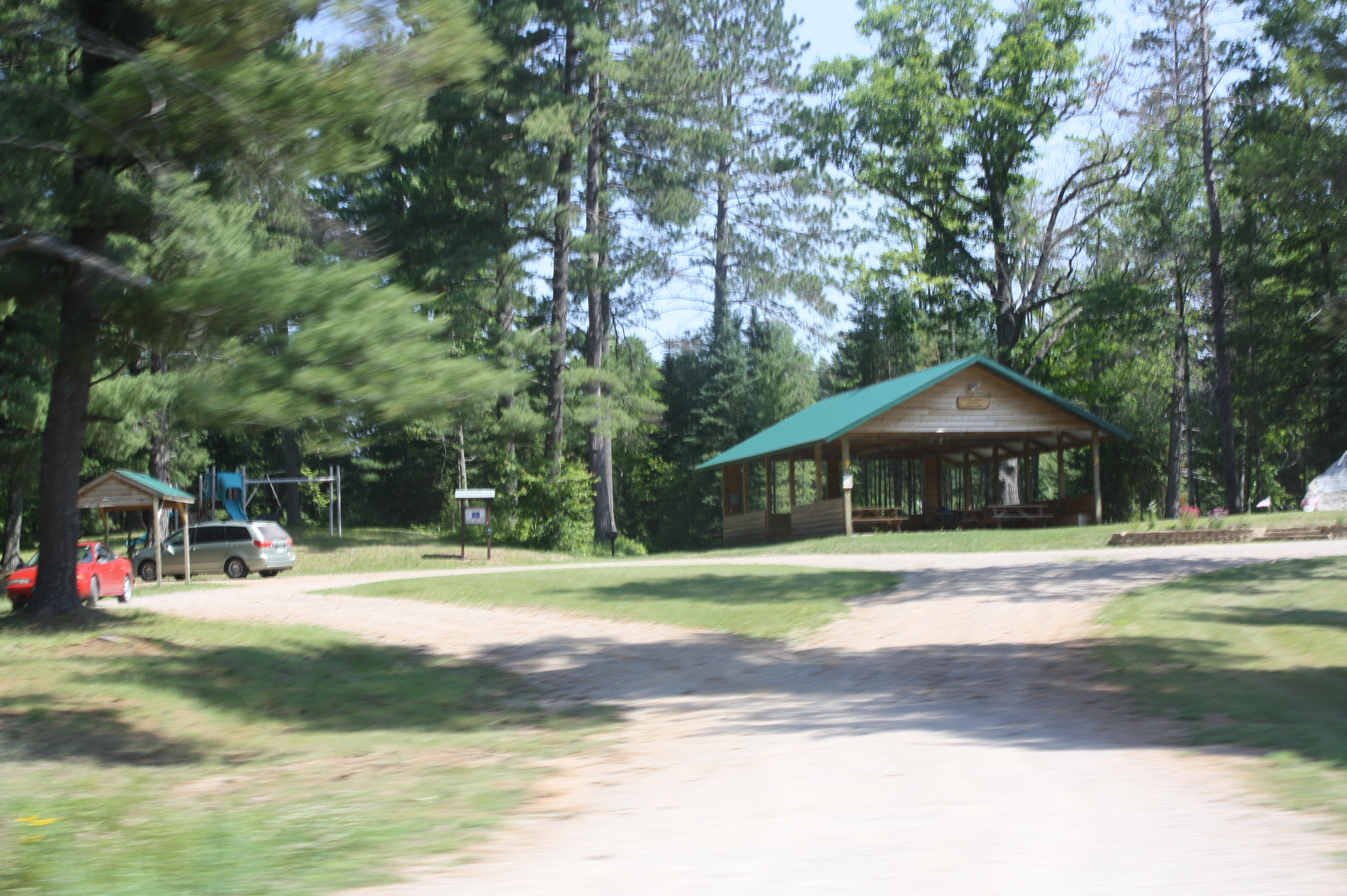
Veteran's Park

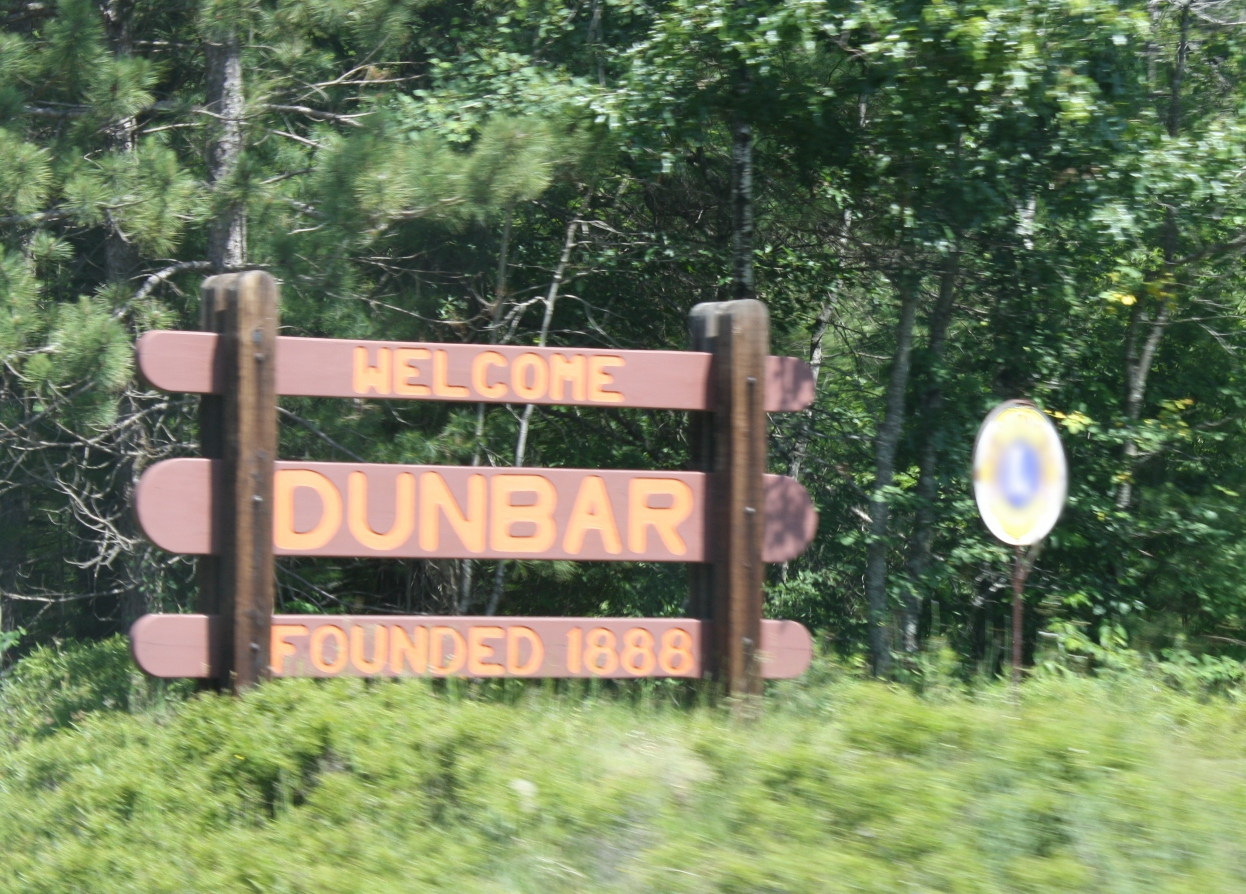
Welcome sign

== See also ==
- List of census-designated places in Wisconsin
