= F. Lammot Belin =

American politician

2nd Chief of Protocol of the United States
- In office November 17, 1930 – September 15, 1931
- President: Herbert Hoover
- Preceded by: James Clement Dunn
- Succeeded by: Warren Delano Robbins

United States Ambassador to Poland
- In office December 13, 1932 – March 4, 1933
- President: Herbert Hoover
- Preceded by: John N. Willys
- Succeeded by: John Cudahy

Personal details
- Born: Ferdinand Lammot Belin; March 15, 1881 Lackawanna County, Pennsylvania, U.S.
- Died: July 6, 1961 (aged 80) Washington, D.C., U.S.
- Children: At least 1

Ferdinand "Mot" Lammot Belin (March 15, 1881 – July 6, 1961) was an American diplomat who served as Chief of Protocol of the United States and as the U.S. Ambassador to Poland in the early 1930s.

== Personal life ==
Belin was married and he had at least one child, Peter Belin, who served as a captain in the U.S. Navy and was a survivor of the zeppelin Hindenburg disaster in 1937.

At one point, Belin was scheduled to travel on the RMS Titanic in 1912, but he canceled his trip. The ship sank in the North Atlantic Ocean during her maiden voyage from Southampton to New York City, killing more than 1,500 people in one of the deadliest peacetime marine disasters.

Belin and his wife bought the Evermay property in Washington, D.C., on November 28, 1923. As part of extensive renovations and enlargements, he removed Victorian elements at the house to restore its Georgian simplicity. He owned the property until his death in 1961, when it was inherited by his son, Peter Belin. Evermay was added to the U.S. National Register of Historic Places in 1973 and is a contributing property to the Georgetown Historic District, a National Historic Landmark.

== Career ==
Belin, a career Foreign Service Officer, was appointed Chief of the Division of International Conferences and Protocol at the U.S. State Department on November 17, 1930. This position later became known as Chief of Protocol of the United States. He retained this position for less than a year and left the office on September 15, 1931.

In 1932, during a recess of the U.S. Senate, President Herbert Hoover appointed Belin to become U.S. Ambassador to the Republic of Poland. Belin presented his credentials on December 13, 1932, and left office a few months later when his recess appointment expired.

== Death ==
Belin died in Washington, D.C., on July 6, 1961, at the age of 80.
