= John A. Gronouski =

American diplomat (1919–1996)

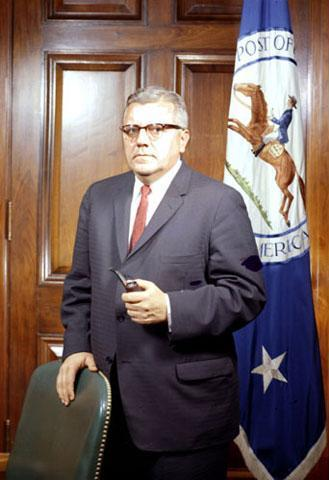

United States Ambassador to Poland
- In office December 7, 1965 – May 26, 1968
- President: Lyndon B. Johnson
- Preceded by: John M. Cabot
- Succeeded by: Walter J. Stoessel Jr.

59th United States Postmaster General
- In office September 30, 1963 – November 2, 1965
- President: John F. Kennedy; Lyndon B. Johnson
- Preceded by: J. Edward Day
- Succeeded by: Larry O'Brien

Personal details
- Born: John Austin Gronouski Jr. October 26, 1919 Dunbar, Wisconsin, U.S.
- Died: January 7, 1996 (aged 76) Green Bay, Wisconsin, U.S.
- Party: Democratic
- Spouse: Mary Metz
- Children: 2
- Education: University of Wisconsin–Madison (BA, MA, PhD)

Military service
- Allegiance: United States
- Branch/service: United States Army
- Years of service: 1942–1945
- Unit: United States Army Air Forces
- Battles/wars: World War II

John Austin Gronouski Jr. (October 26, 1919 – January 7, 1996) was the Wisconsin state commissioner of taxation and served as the United States Postmaster General from 1963 until 1965 under Presidents John F. Kennedy and Lyndon B. Johnson.

== Biography ==
Gronouski was born in Dunbar, Wisconsin, the son of Mary (Riley) and John Austin Gronouski. He was of Polish and Irish descent. He graduated from the University of Wisconsin in 1942, and he joined the military during World War II. Gronouski served as a navigator in the Air Force until October 1945. Gronouski married the former Mary Louise Metz on January 24, 1948. They had two daughters, Stacy Ann Jennings and Julia Kay Glieberman.

He earned an M.A. in 1947 and a Ph.D. in 1955, both from the University of Wisconsin. In 1952, he ran for the United States Senate against Joseph McCarthy, who won reelection. In 1959, Gronouski joined the Wisconsin Department of Revenue and was named the executive director of the Revenue Survey Commission.

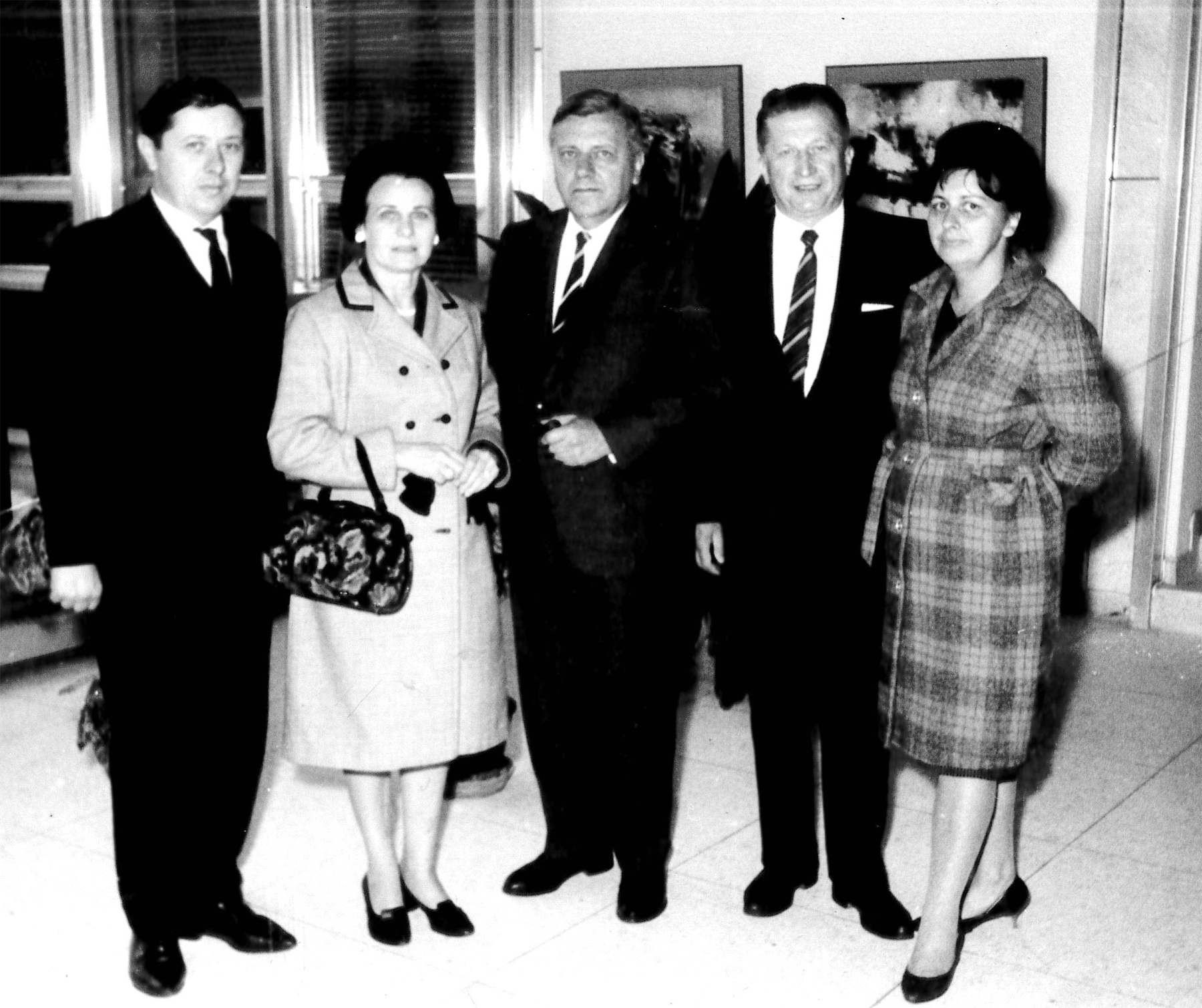
John Gronouski, Ambassador to Poland, meets his friends Wiesław and Longina Czajkowski with Chairman of the Polish-American Chamber of Commerce in Detroit, Chester A. Kozdroj and his wife Helena at the U.S. Embassy in Warsaw, September, 1966.

In 1960, he became the Wisconsin state commissioner of taxation, and he supported John F. Kennedy for President. In 1963 Gronouski was appointed Postmaster General, the first Polish-American Cabinet officer. As Postmaster General, Gronouski promoted the original five-digit zip code system, and worked to end racial discrimination against postal employees. After he left the Cabinet on November 2, 1965, President Lyndon B. Johnson appointed him to be Ambassador to Poland.

After President Richard M. Nixon took office in 1969, Gronouski became founding dean of the Lyndon B. Johnson School of Public Affairs at the University of Texas at Austin. Gronouski served as dean until 1974. He served as a member of Eisenhower Commission (on international radio broadcasting) and as the Chairman of the Board for International Broadcasting during the Carter administration.

In retirement, Gronouski lived in Green Bay, Wisconsin, where he died on January 7, 1996. He is interred in Allouez Catholic Cemetery and Chapel Mausoleum in Green Bay, Wisconsin.

Political offices
Preceded by J. Edward Day	United States Postmaster General; Served under: John F. Kennedy, Lyndon B. Johnson; September 30, 1963 – November 2, 1965	Succeeded by Lawrence F. O'Brien
Diplomatic posts
Preceded by John M. Cabot	United States Ambassador to Poland; 1965–1968	Succeeded by Walter J. Stoessel Jr.
