= Mary Simons Gibson =

American reformer and California state commissioner (1855-1930)

- Born: Mary K. Simons; April 10, 1855; San Jose, California
- Died: September 11, 1930 (aged 75); Los Angeles, California

Mary Simons Gibson (1855-1930) was an American social reformer.

== Biography ==
Gibson née Simons was born on April 10, 1855 in San Jose, California. She taught school in San Jose before relocating to Los Angeles.

In 1880 she helped found the "Los Angeles Orphans Home Society". In 1881 she married Frank Asbury Gibson. Their son Hugh S. Gibson (1883-1954) was an American diplomat.

Gibson was active in the Women's suffrage movement in California, and with the passage of the 19th amendment, participated in the League of Women Voters of California.

Gibson was appointed to serve on the Commission of Immigration and Housing (CCIH) which was created in 1913 by Hiram Johnson. There she advocated for adequate housing and education for immigrants. She was particularly interested in conditions for immigrant women and mothers.

Gibson was a charter member of the Friday Morning Club of Los Angeles. She was also a member of the California Federation of Women’s Clubs, drafting a history of the organization for the General Federation of Women's Clubs.

Simons died on September 11, 1930 in Los Angeles, California.
