= Photo psychology =

Speciality within psychology

Photo psychology or photopsychology is a specialty within psychology dedicated to identifying and analyzing relationships between psychology and photography. Photopsychology traces several points of contact between photography and psychology.

Many forms of photography have been used in psychology including, patient portrait photographs, family photographs, ambiguous photographs and photographers' photographs. Forms of psychological practices using photographs include photoanalysis, phototherapy, Walker Visuals, and Reading Pictures.

== Timeline ==
At the 111th APA convention in 2003, Joel Morgovsky, a photographer and retired psychology professor from Brookdale Community College, in Lincroft, New Jersey, alongside three other colleagues, presented a timeline of interactions between photography and psychology (see table below).

History
Date	Person	Event	Importance
1856	Hugh W. Diamond	Portraits help diagnose, treat, and catalogue patients	First point of contact between photography and psychiatry
1973	Robert U. Akeret	Introduces Photoanalysis	Establishes the use of family photographs in psychotherapy
1983	Joel Morgovsky	Introduces Reading Pictures	First formal presentation on what would become "reading pictures"
1986	Joel Walker	Introduces Walker Visuals	First use of ambiguous photographs to be used as projective stimuli for clinical use
1999	Judy Weiser	Introduces PhotoTherapy	Establishes loose techniques collectively known as phototherapy
2003	Franklin, Formanek, Blum, & Morgovsky	Present photopsychology timeline at 111th APA convention	First symposium identifying interactions between photography and psychology

== Photography in psychotherapy ==
=== Patient portraits ===
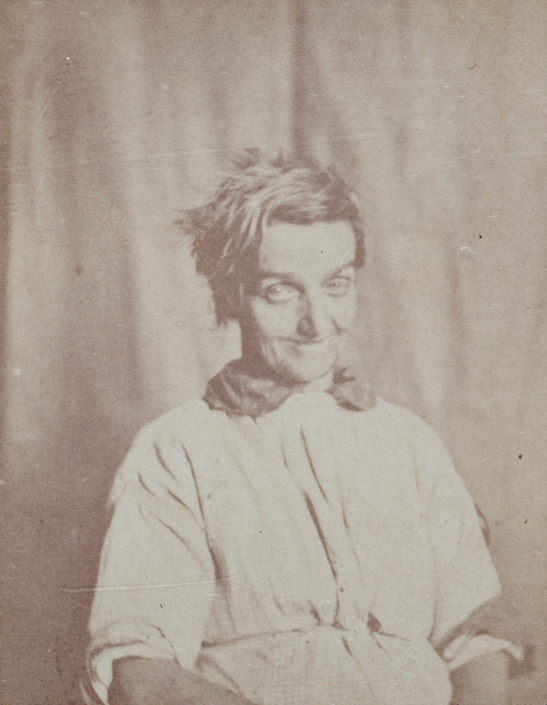
Portrait of a patient, Surrey County Asylum

In 1856, only a couple of decades after photography began, Hugh W. Diamond, a psychiatrist at the Surrey Asylum in Surrey County, England began taking photographs of his patients to aid in diagnosing and treating them. Since the portraits contained more information about his patients' levels of emotion than language, definitions, or classifications, they helped with more accurate diagnoses. For example, mental suffering can be categorized under vague terms such as distress, sorrow, grief, melancholy, anguish, and despair, but a photograph speaks for itself, precisely identifying where the patient is on the scale of unhappiness.

In sharing these portraits with the patients' themselves, Diamond found that the portraits can produce a positive effect on the patients, especially if successive portraits illustrate their progress to recovery. One case study conducted by Diamond revealed how a patient's portraits helped lead to a cure through providing an attainable outside perspective of reality. The patient suffered from delusions which consisted of supposed possession of great wealth and holding status of being a Queen. In seeing her portraits and her frequent conversations about them with her therapist, she was able to gradually let go of her former imagined status.

In addition to helping diagnose and treat his patients, Diamond also suggested that these portraits could help in protection and clear representation of patients in case of readmission; similarly to how mug shots are helpful for prisons with improving certainty of previous conviction and in recapturing someone who might have escaped.

=== Personal photographs ===
Photoanalysis, proposed by Robert U. Akeret, is the study of body language in personal photographs (e.g. family photographs) to increase self-awareness, better understand interpersonal relationships, and more accurately recollect past episodic events. Phototherapy, like photoanalysis, is a therapeutic technique which analyzes personal photographs and the feelings, thoughts, memories, and associations these photos evoke, as a way to deepen insight and enhance communication during therapy session. Currently, phototherapy is being practiced by Judy Weiser in Vancouver, Canada in the PhotoTherapy Center.

=== Ambiguous photographs ===
Walker Visuals, four 13" x 19" color, ambiguous, abstract, dreamlike, and evocative photographs, were created by psychiatrist and photographer, Joel Walker. Similarly to the Rorschach test, what is perceived when looking at these photographs depends on one's own history, expectations, needs, beliefs, feelings, and what happened just before viewing the image. Walker created these images after observing how his patients responded to strange photos he had taken and displayed on his office wall. From there, Walker expended his collection to include a range of themes from positive to negative. The images act as representations of his patient's inner world which allow them to better verbalize feelings and memories. Walker visuals can be used universally across culture, language, education, and class.

=== Photographers' photographs ===
Reading Pictures is the study of photographs as reflections of the makers' personal, subjective experiences. Morgovsky, a pioneer in Reading Pictures, established six fundamental mindsets needed for Reading Pictures:

1. Overcoming The Illusion of Reality (OTIR): Understand that photographs are 2D representations, rather than reality.
2. The Rule of No Accidents (RNA): Everything in a photograph is there on purpose; created when one makes the decision to expose a moment in time as a representation of a conscious experience.
3. Free Association (FA): An attitude of openness to projected, emotional content of photograph.
4. Attribution Process (AP): Guess the cause of observed behavior; ask questions like: "What does it mean that this person would take this particular photograph, of this subject matter, from this point of view, using these methods?". This mindset was proposed by Fritz Heider and Harold Kelley.
5. Thematic Analysis (TA): Analyze cognitive and emotional themes that run through collections of work to construct a working model of the photographer's experiential world.
6. Genre and Skill Level (GSL): Take into consideration genre and skill level.
  - Examples of genre include landscape, still-life, portraiture, documentary, straight, surreal, etc.
  - Skill level can be classified along levels of articulation (LOA):
    - Innocent Photographers: camera owners who take pictures on an irregular basis for chronicling family events, vacations, and special moments. They do not consider themselves photographers beyond a functional level and articulate themselves the least, but Reading Pictures can still be applied on the work innocents.
    - Amateur Photographers: people who enjoy photography, join photography societies, and obtain new and updated cameras, lenses, light sources, etc. These photographers are less personally expressive, since they are often inspired to imitate work of other photographers they admire, and are masked by attempting to master a technical skill.
    - Mature Photographers: photographers that consciously use the medium as creative self-expression; they developed their own ways of seeing through the lens and have their own personal style, which is consistent through most of their work. This group is the most articulate, so reading a few photos of theirs can provide insight into their personal cognitive and emotional experience.

== See also ==
- Therapeutic photography
