= Boris D. Bogen =

Jewish-American educator and social worker

Boris David Bogen
- Born: Boris David Katzenelenbogen; July 25, 1869; Moscow, Russia
- Died: June 29, 1929 (aged 59); Arcadia, California, USA
- Education: University of Moscow; New York University School of Pedagogy
- Spouse: Elizabeth Scholtz (m. 1890)
- Children: 6

Boris David Bogen (July 25, 1869 – June 29, 1929) was a Russian-born Jewish-American educator and social worker.

== Biography ==
Bogen was born on July 25, 1869, in Moscow, Russia, the son of David Katzenelenbogen and Lina Meerowitz. He immigrated to America shortly after graduating from the University of Moscow in 1888. He settled in New York City, New York, and studied English at the Educational Alliance, where he later became a librarian and teacher.

Bogen attended the New York University School of Pedagogy, graduating from there with a Pd.M. in 1895 and a Pd.D. in 1898. He worked as an instructor at the Baron de Hirsch Trade School from 1894 to 1896, a teacher at the Hebrew Technical Institute from 1896 to 1900, and principal of the Baron de Hirsch Agricultural School in Woodbine, New Jersey, from 1900 to 1904. He left the Hebrew Technical Institute due to his objections to its pure Americanism emphasis, and when he joined the Bar de Hirsch Agricultural School he hoped he'd be able to help young Jews leave the sweatshop and become farmers. However, the students proved more interested in the administrative and scientific sides of agriculture, and he dissented with the directors and their efforts to reduce the study length from three years to one and to eliminate the scientific components to encourage the students to work in the fields. While working there, he persuaded the state legislature to establish a municipal government in Woodbine and make people in the local Jewish farm colony more conscious of their citizenship.

Bogen then worked as director of the United Jewish Charities in Cincinnati, Ohio, from 1904 to 1910, at which point he became field secretary of the Conference of Jewish Charities. In 1913, he was also appointed field agent of the National Conference of Jewish Social Service. During World War I, he was director-general of the Joint Distribution Committee and, via his base of operations in Holland, sent a continuous supply of relief across Germany to suffering Jews in Poland and western Russia. He then went to Poland as an agent of the committee, and while there he travelled with the Hoover mission and organized the distribution of funds American Jews contributed for relief. He then returned to the United States and served as superintendent of the Jewish Charities in Los Angeles, California. He was appointed international secretary of B'nai B'rith in 1925 and held that office until his death. He also became national secretary of the Anti-Defamation League, which like its mother organization B'nai B'rith relocated from Cincinnati to Chicago. B'nai B'rith later established in his memory the Boris D. Bogen-Isaac M. Rubinow forest in Palestine. In 1926, he received an honorary Doctor of Law degree from Hebrew Union College. A month before his death, he was elected president of the National Conference of Jewish Social Service. He was also managing editor of B'nai B'rith Magazine and wrote Jewish Philanthropy in the United States in 1917. His book Born a Jew was published posthumously in 1930.

== Personal life ==
Bogen attended B'nai B'rith Temple in Los Angeles and the Rockdale Temple in Cincinnati. In 1890, he married Elizabeth Scholtz in Russia. They had six children.

Bogen died on June 29, 1929 while attending a family reunion in Arcadia, California. Over a thousand people attended his funeral at B’nai Brith Hall in Los Angeles, including prominent leaders of the Pacific Coast's Jewish community. Rabbi Herman Lissaner of Temple Emanu-El, Wider Scope Committee chairman Henry Monsky, the Constitution Grand Lodge vice-president Lucius Solomons, and I. Irving Lipsitch of the local Federation of Jewish Welfare Organizations and the National Conference of Jewish Social Service delivered eulogies.
