= William Woodville Rockhill =

American diplomat and Sinologist (1854–1914)

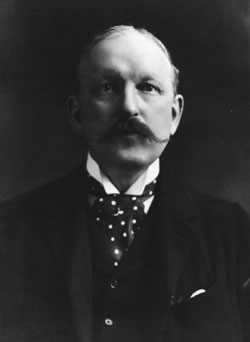

United States Ambassador to the Ottoman Empire
- In office August 28, 1911 – November 20, 1913
- President: William Howard Taft
- Preceded by: Oscar Straus
- Succeeded by: Henry Morgenthau, Sr.

United States Ambassador to Russia
- In office January 11, 1910 – June 17, 1911
- President: William Howard Taft
- Preceded by: John W. Riddle
- Succeeded by: Curtis Guild, Jr.

United States Ambassador to China
- In office March 8, 1905 – June 1, 1909
- President: Theodore Roosevelt; William Howard Taft
- Preceded by: Edwin H. Conger
- Succeeded by: William J. Calhoun

United States Ambassador to Romania
- In office May 7, 1898 – April 27, 1899
- President: William McKinley
- Preceded by: Eben Alexander
- Succeeded by: Arthur Sherburne Hardy

United States Ambassador to Serbia
- In office May 18, 1898 – April 27, 1899
- President: William McKinley
- Preceded by: Eben Alexander
- Succeeded by: Arthur Sherburne Hardy

United States Ambassador to Greece
- In office September 25, 1897 – April 27, 1899
- President: William McKinley
- Preceded by: Eben Alexander
- Succeeded by: Arthur Sherburne Hardy

Personal details
- Born: April 1, 1854 Philadelphia, Pennsylvania, U.S.
- Died: December 8, 1914 (aged 60) Honolulu, Hawaii

William Woodville Rockhill (April 1, 1854 – December 8, 1914) was a United States diplomat, best known as the author of the U.S.'s Open Door Policy for China, the first American to learn to speak Tibetan, and one of the West's leading experts on the modern political history of China.

== Life and career ==
Rockhill was born in Philadelphia, the son of Thomas Cadwalader Rockhill and Dorothea Anne Woodville (1823–1913). His father died when he was 13 years old and his mother relocated the family to France to escape the Civil War. While in his teens, Rockhill read Abbé Huc's account of his 1844-46 voyage to Lhasa, which sparked young Rockhill's interest in Tibet. Rockhill sought out the celebrated Orientalist Léon Feer of the Bibliothèque Nationale, who guided Rockhill's learning about the Far East. Rockhill attended the École spéciale militaire de Saint-Cyr, where he studied Tibetan. After graduation, Rockhill joined the French Foreign Legion, serving as an officer in Algiers.

In 1876, Rockhill returned to the United States, and on December 14, 1876, he married his childhood sweetheart, Caroline Tyson, daughter of J. Washington Tyson and Marie Louise (Hewling) Tyson of Philadelphia. The couple purchased a cattle ranch in New Mexico, but Rockhill concluded that ranching was not to his liking. By 1880, he had completed a French language translation of the Tibetan version of the Udanavarga, which was published in 1881.

The Rockhills sold the ranch in 1881 and moved to Montreux, Switzerland, where William's mother lived. He spent the next three years in Europe studying Tibetan, Sanskrit, and Chinese. During this period, he co-authored a biography of the Buddha with Nanjo Bunyu and Ernst Leumann, and completed a French language translation of the Prātimokṣa sūtra, published in 1884 under the title Prâtimoksha sutra; ou, Le traité d'émancipation selon la version tibétaine: avec notes et extraits du Dulva (Vinaya).

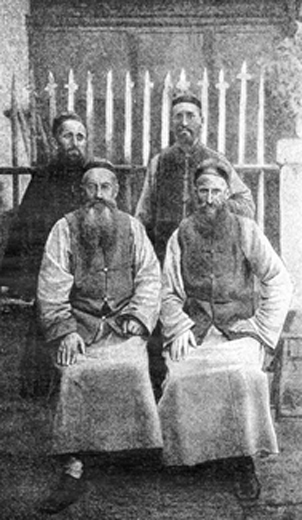
Four Westerners in Tatsienlu, 1890, photographed by Prince Henri d'Orléans. From left: Father Déjean, Bishop Félix Biet, the American Tibetologist William Woodville Rockhill and Father Jean André Soulié

In 1883, Rockhill's wife inherited $70,000 from the death of a cousin, allowing Rockhill to take an unpaid position with the American Legation in Peking. After perfecting his language skills, he was upgraded to a paid position. In the 1880s, he made two extended expeditions into western China, Mongolia and Tibet. He sent an account of his travels to the Smithsonian Institution for publication (as The Land of the Lamas (1891)), and in 1893, he was awarded the Patron's Medal of the Royal Geographical Society. Artifacts from Rockhill's expeditions are in the collections of the Department of Anthropology, National Museum of Natural History, Smithsonian Institution, and archival materials are in their associated archives, the National Anthropological Archives.

Rockhill wrote a glossary of Salar in his 1894 book Diary of a Journey through Mongolia and Tibet in 1891 and 1892.

During the administration of President of the United States Grover Cleveland, Rockhill served as Third Assistant Secretary of State from April 17, 1894, until February 13, 1896. He then served as United States Assistant Secretary of State under United States Secretary of State Richard Olney from February 14, 1896, until May 10, 1897.

In 1897, President William McKinley named Rockhill U.S. Minister to Greece, a position he held from September 25, 1897, to April 27, 1899. He concurrently served as Minister to Serbia from May 7, 1898, to April 27, 1899, and as Minister to Romania from May 18, 1898, to April 27, 1899. From 1899 to 1905, he served as Director-General of the International Union of American Republics.

With the outbreak of the Boxer Rebellion, U.S. Secretary of State John Hay, who knew little of the Far East, turned to Rockhill for guidance. As such, Rockhill drafted a memorandum that spelled out the famous Open Door Policy towards China; this memorandum was circulated to Russia, Britain, Germany, France, Japan, and Italy and in March 1900, Secretary Hay announced that all the Great Powers had signed off on the Open Door Policy. Rockhill was then despatched as President McKinley's special envoy, where he represented the U.S. in the Conference of Ministers that followed the ending of the Boxer Rebellion. During the negotiations surrounding the Boxer Protocol, Rockhill argued against full war reparations and instead encouraging the Great Powers to settle for a lump sum of $333 million in reparations to be divided amongst themselves in proportion to their expenses incurred in intervening in China. At Rockhill's urging, the American share of war reparations was used to establish the Boxer Indemnity Scholarship Program.

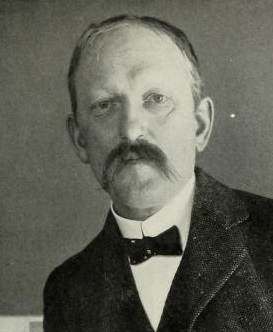
Rockhill at Washington, D. C. in 1902

In 1905, President Theodore Roosevelt appointed Rockhill as United States Ambassador to China, a position he held from June 17, 1905 to June 1, 1909. This appointment came in the wake of the British Expedition to Tibet (1903–1904) that had forced Thubten Gyatso, 13th Dalai Lama into isolation. Learning that Rockhill spoke Tibetan, the Dalai Lama entered into a correspondence that was to last until Rockhill's death. In June 1908, Rockhill made a five-day on-foot trek to Mount Wutai to meet the Dalai Lama and successfully convinced the Dalai Lama to seek peace with China and Britain.

In 1909, President William Howard Taft named Rockhill Minister to Russia and Rockhill held this post from January 11, 1910, until June 17, 1911. President Taft then named him Minister to the Ottoman Empire, and he held this post from August 28, 1911, until November 20, 1913.

=== Death ===
Appointed Advisor to the President of China, Yuan Shikai, in 1914, Rockhill sailed from San Francisco for China via Japan aboard the SS Chiyo Maru. Afflicted by a severe cold he contracted in San Francisco, he developed pleurisy on the voyage, and had to leave the ship on arrival at Honolulu for treatment. Four days later, the pleurisy overcome, the ordeal occasioned him heart failure and he died in a Honolulu hospital on 8 December 1914, aged 60. Rockhill is buried in the East Cemetery in Litchfield, Connecticut.

== Selected works ==
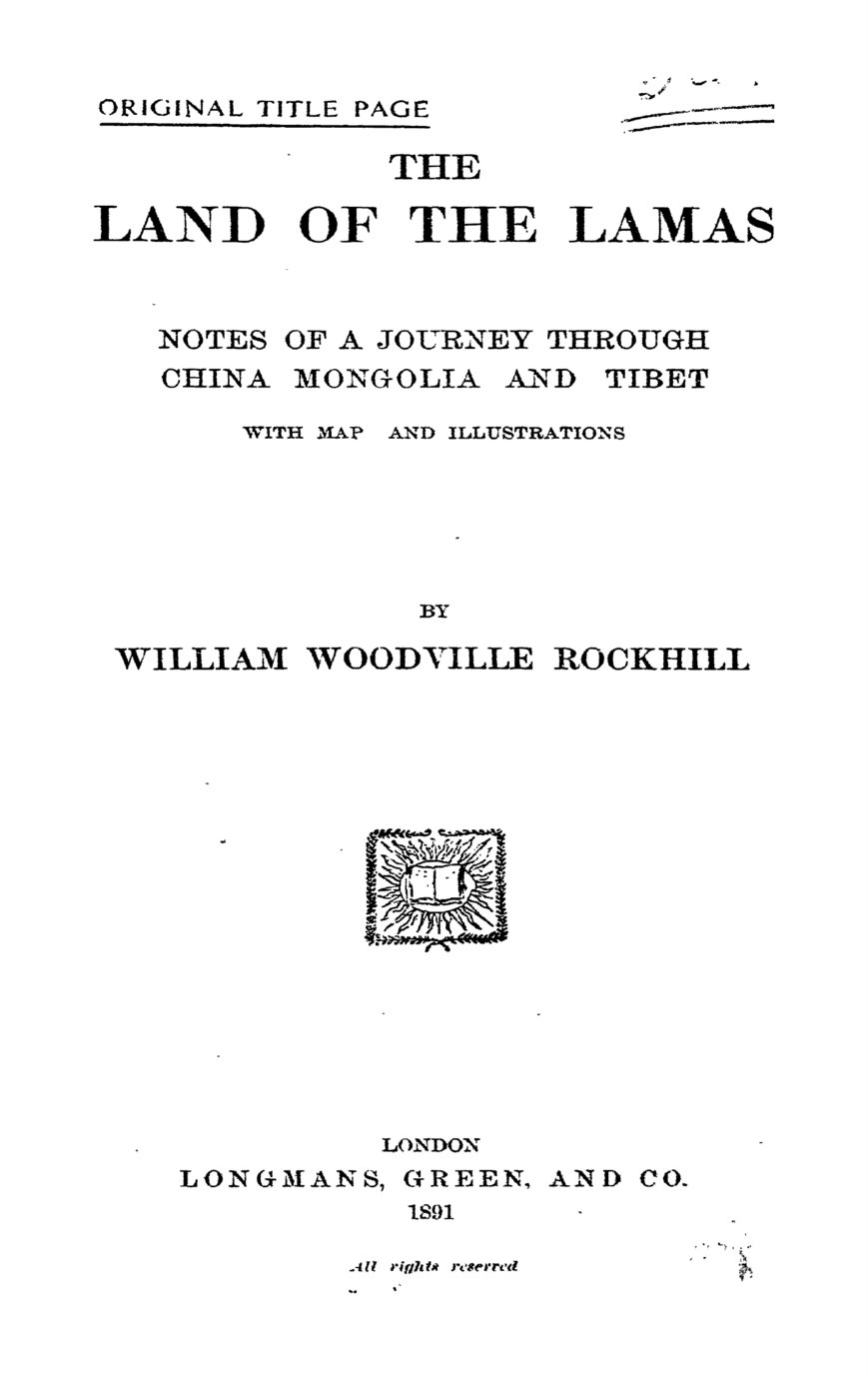
The Land of the Lamas

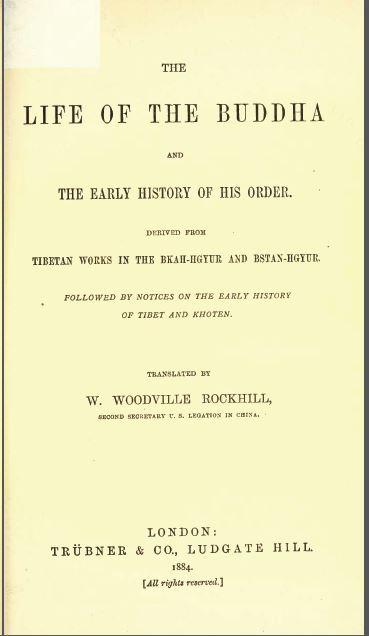
Life of the Buddha

- Udânavarga: A Collection of Verses from the Buddhist Canon (1883)
- Prâtimoksha sutra; ou, Le traité d'émancipation selon la version tibétaine: avec notes et extraits du Dulva (Vinaya) (1884)
- with Ernst Leumann and Nanjo Bunyu, The Life of the Buddha: And the Early History of His Order (1884)
- The Land of the Lamas: Notes of a Journey Through China, Mongolia and Tibet (1891)
- Explorations in Mongolia and Tibet (1893)
- Diary of a Journey Through Mongolia and Thibet in 1891 and 1892 (1894)
- Journey through Mongolia and Tibet, 1891 and 1892 (1894)
- Notes on the Ethnology of Tibet: Based on the Collections in the U.S. National Museum (1895)
- The Journey of William of Rubruck to the Eastern Parts of the World (1900)
- China's Intercourse with Korea from the XVth Century To 1895 (1905)
- Diplomatic Audiences at the Court of China (1905)
- The Dalai Lamas of Lhasa and Their Relations with the Manchu Emperors of China. 1644-1908 (1910)
- "Diplomatic Missions to the Court of China: The Kotow Question I," The American Historical Review, Vol. 2, No. 3 (Apr., 1897), pp. 427–442.
- "Diplomatic Missions to the Court of China: The Kotow Question II," The American Historical Review, Vol. 2, No. 4 (Jul., 1897), pp. 627–643.

=== Edited works ===
- Journey to Lhasa and Central Tibet (1902)

Government offices
Preceded by Edward Henry Strobel	Third Assistant Secretary of State; April 17, 1894 – February 13, 1896	Succeeded by William Woodward Baldwin
Preceded by Edwin F. Uhl	United States Assistant Secretary of State; February 14, 1896 – May 10, 1897	Succeeded by William R. Day
Diplomatic posts
Preceded by Eben Alexander	United States Ambassador to Greece; September 25, 1897 – April 27, 1899	Succeeded by Arthur Sherburne Hardy
Preceded by Eben Alexander	United States Ambassador to Serbia; May 7, 1898 – April 27, 1899	Succeeded by Arthur Sherburne Hardy
Preceded by Eben Alexander	United States Ambassador to Romania; May 18, 1898 – April 27, 1899	Succeeded by Arthur Sherburne Hardy
Preceded by Edwin H. Conger	United States Ambassador to China; March 8, 1905 – June 1, 1909	Succeeded by William J. Calhoun
Preceded by John W. Riddle	United States Ambassador to Russia; January 11, 1910 – June 17, 1911	Succeeded by Curtis Guild, Jr.
Preceded by Oscar Straus	United States Ambassador to Turkey; August 28, 1911 – November 20, 1913	Succeeded by Henry Morgenthau, Sr.
