= J. Meredith Read =

American diplomat and author

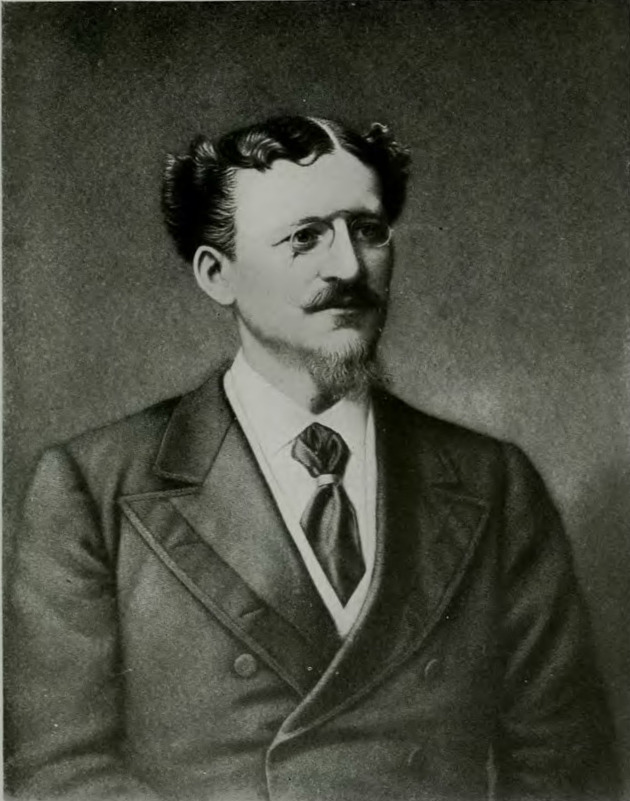

U.S. Minister to Greece
- In office 1873–1879
- Preceded by: John M. Francis
- Succeeded by: Eugene Schuyler

Adjutant General of New York
- In office 1861–1861
- Preceded by: Frederick Townsend
- Succeeded by: Thomas Hillhouse,

Personal details
- Born: John Meredith Read Jr. February 21, 1837 Philadelphia, Pennsylvania, U.S.
- Died: December 27, 1896 (aged 59) Paris, France
- Party: Republican
- Relations: John Read (grandfather)
- Parent(s): John M. Read; Priscilla Marshall Read
- Education: Brown University; Albany Law School

John Meredith Read Jr. (February 21, 1837 – December 27, 1896) was a United States diplomat and author.

== Early life ==
Read was born in Philadelphia, Pennsylvania on February 21, 1837. He was one of five children born to Priscilla (née Marshall) Read and John Meredith Read, Sr., a prominent Philadelphia jurist who served as Attorney General of Pennsylvania. After his mother's death in 1841, his father married Amelia Thompson in 1855.

His paternal grandfather was lawyer and banker John Read. His paternal great-grandfather George Read, a U.S. Senator from Delaware who was one of two statesmen who signed the original Petition to the King of the Congress of 1774, the Declaration of Independence, and the Constitution of the United States.

Read graduated from Albany Law School in 1859 and studied international law in Europe before admission to the bar in Philadelphia. He later graduated from Brown University, where he received the degree of A.M. in 1866. While at Brown, he joined the fraternity Alpha Delta Phi.

== Career ==
After becoming an attorney, Read moved to Albany, New York and became the Adjutant General of New York in 1861. He was one of the originators of the "Wide-Awake" political clubs in 1860. In April 1860, he was chairman of the committee of three to draft a bill on behalf of New York, appropriating $300,000 to purchase of arms and equipment for the Civil War. Later, the War Department thanked him for his ability and zeal in organizing, equipping, and forwarding troops.

He was elected as a member to the American Philosophical Society in 1867.

=== Consul General for France and Germany ===
Read was the first U.S. consul general for France and Algeria from 1869 to 1873 and acting consul general for Germany from 1870 to 1872. He served as acting consul general for Germany during the Franco-Prussian War. His work representing German interests in Paris lasted several months after U.S. Minister to France, Elihu Washburne, stopped being the official representative of the German government in June 1871. After the war, he was appointed by the French Minister of War, General Ernest Courtot de Cissey, to form and preside over a commission to examine into the desirability of teaching the English language to the French troops.

=== U.S. Minister to Greece ===
In November 1873, he was appointed U.S. Minister Resident in Greece. One of his first acts was to secure the release of the American ship Armenia and to obtain from the Greek government revocation of the order that prohibited the sale of the Bible in Greece. During the Russo-Turkish War of 1877–1878, he discovered that only one port in Russia was still open, and he pointed out to Secretary of State William M. Evarts the advantages that would accrue to the commerce of the United States were a grain fleet dispatched from New York City to that port. The event justified his judgment since the exports of cereals from the United States increased within a year to $73,000,000. While Chargé d'Affaires, he received the thanks of the U.S. Government for his effectual protection of persons and interests of the United States in the dangerous crisis of 1878. Soon afterward the United States Congress, from motives of economy, refused the appropriation for the legation at Athens, and Read, believing that the time was too critical to withdraw the mission, carried it on at his individual expense until his resignation on September 23, 1879.

In 1886 after his resignation, the territory that had been adjudged to Greece had been finally transferred, King George I of Greece created him a Knight Grand Cross of the Order of the Redeemer, the highest dignity in the gift of the Greek government. After 1881, he continued residing in Paris.

=== Writer ===
Read was president of the social science congress at Albany in 1868, and vice president of the one at Plymouth, England, in 1872. He wrote Historical Enquiry concerning Henry Hudson, which discussed Hudson's origins, and the sources of the ideas that guided that navigator (Albany, 1866). Historic Studies in Vaud, Berne, and Savoy; from Roman Times to Voltaire, Rousseau and Gibbon was published in 1897. He also made contributions to current literature, including Appletons' Cyclopædia of American Biography, published in 1892.

== Personal life ==
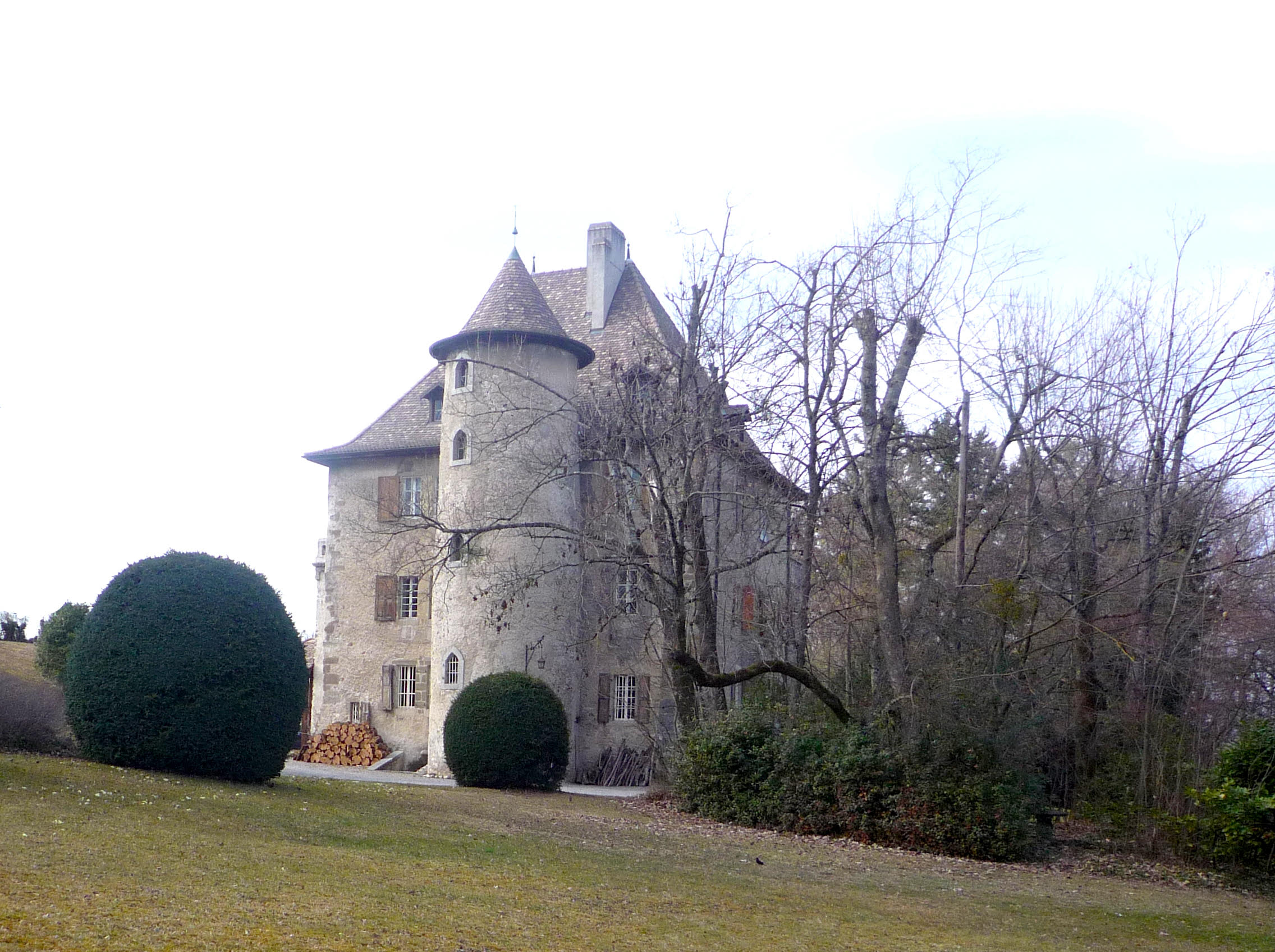
The Château de Thuyset, Thonon-les-Bains on the shores of Lake Geneva

On April 7, 1859, Read was married to Delphine Marie Pumpelly (1833–1902). Her father was Harmon Pumpelly, president of the Albany Savings Bank, the Albany Insurance Company, and the Albany Gaslight Company. Her mother was a Delphine Drake Pumpelly, daughter of U.S. Representative John R. Drake of Owego, New York. Together, they were the parents of four children:

- Harmon Pumpelly Read (1860–1925), a capitalist who married French-born Catherine Marguerite de Carron d'Allondons (1866–1940).
- Emily Meredith Read (1863–1940), who married Francis Aquila Stout, a great-grandson of signer Lewis Morris, in 1884. His sister, Sarah Morris Stout, was the wife of Baron Ancelis de Vaugrigneuse of the French Embassy in Washington. After his 1892 death, she married Edward Spencer, a descendant of one of the founders of Stockbridge, at the American Cathedral in Paris in June 1894.
- John Meredith Read III (b. 1869), who married Countess Alix de Foras, a daughter of Count Amédée de Foras, the Grand Marshal of the Court of Bulgaria, in 1901.
- Marie Delphine Meredith Read (b. 1873), who married Count Maximilien de Foras of Château de Thuyset, Thonon-les-Bains, Haute Savoie in 1895. Count Max was the brother of Countess Alix de Foras.

In 1892, the Reads gave a dinner in honor of the departing U.S. Minister Whitelaw Reid, at their home in Paris. After a severe attack of bronchitis, Read died in Paris on December 27, 1896. He was buried at the Old Communal Cemetery at Saint-Germain-en-Laye. His widow also died in Paris on May 29, 1902, and was buried in the same cemetery.
