= Jinling engraving technology =

Chinese traditional handicraft

Jinling engraving technology is a traditional handicraft in Nanjing, China. It is produced by four manual procedures: pattern writing, plate engraving, printing and binding, there are more than 20 kinds of small processes in them. Initially, Jinling engraving technology was used to make Buddhist scriptures, later this delicate craft has been passed down with Buddhism. It was listed as a national intangible cultural heritage on May 20, 2006.

Yang Renshan, the founder of the revival of Buddhist culture in modern China, founded the Jinling Sutra Engraving Office, inheriting Jinling engraving technology and Buddha statues, located at No. 35 Huaihai Road, Baixia District, Nanjing City, Jiangsu Province, China, has become the inheritance base of Jinling engraving technology

== Gallery ==
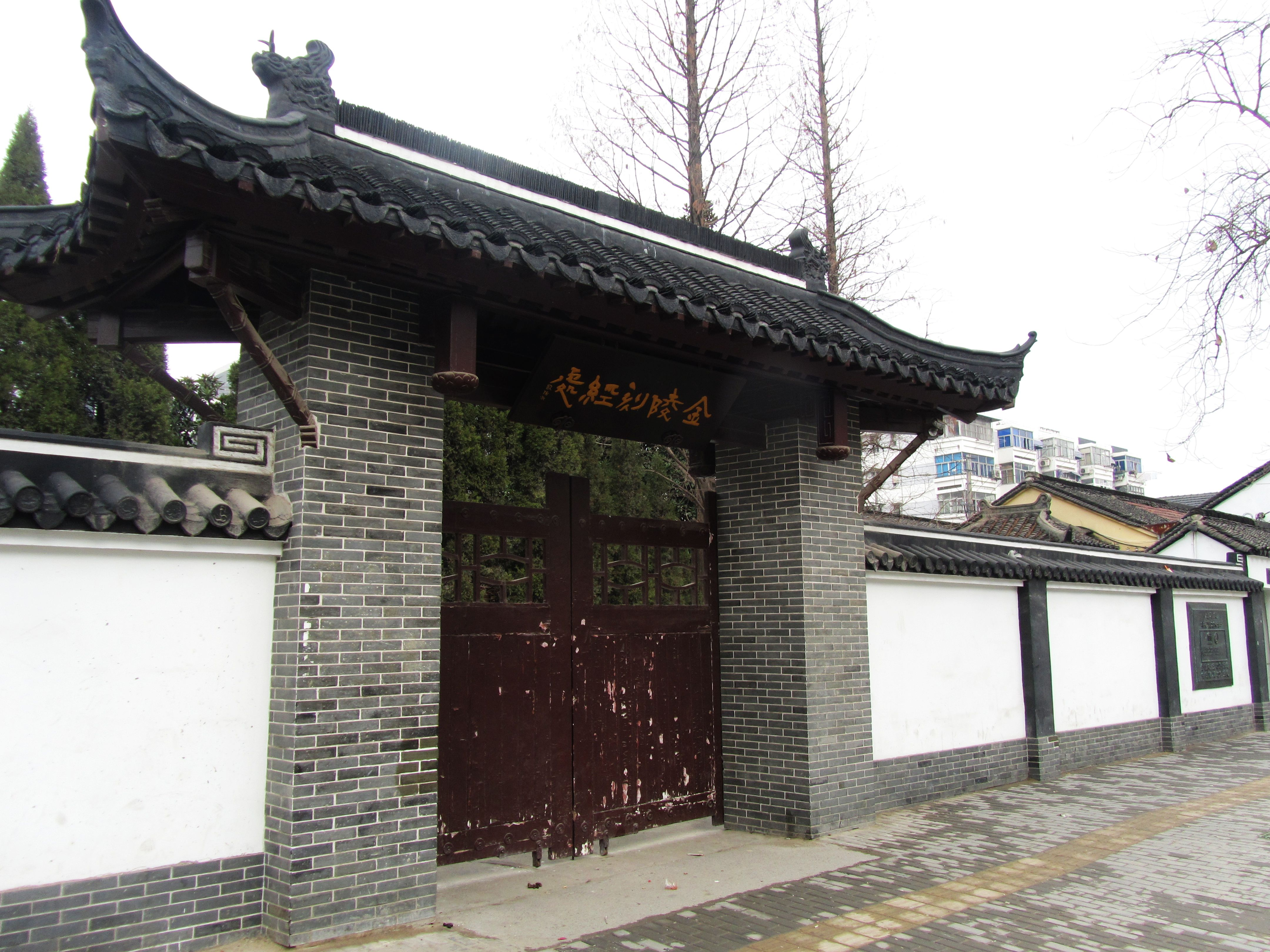
The Jinling Scriptural Press, 2012

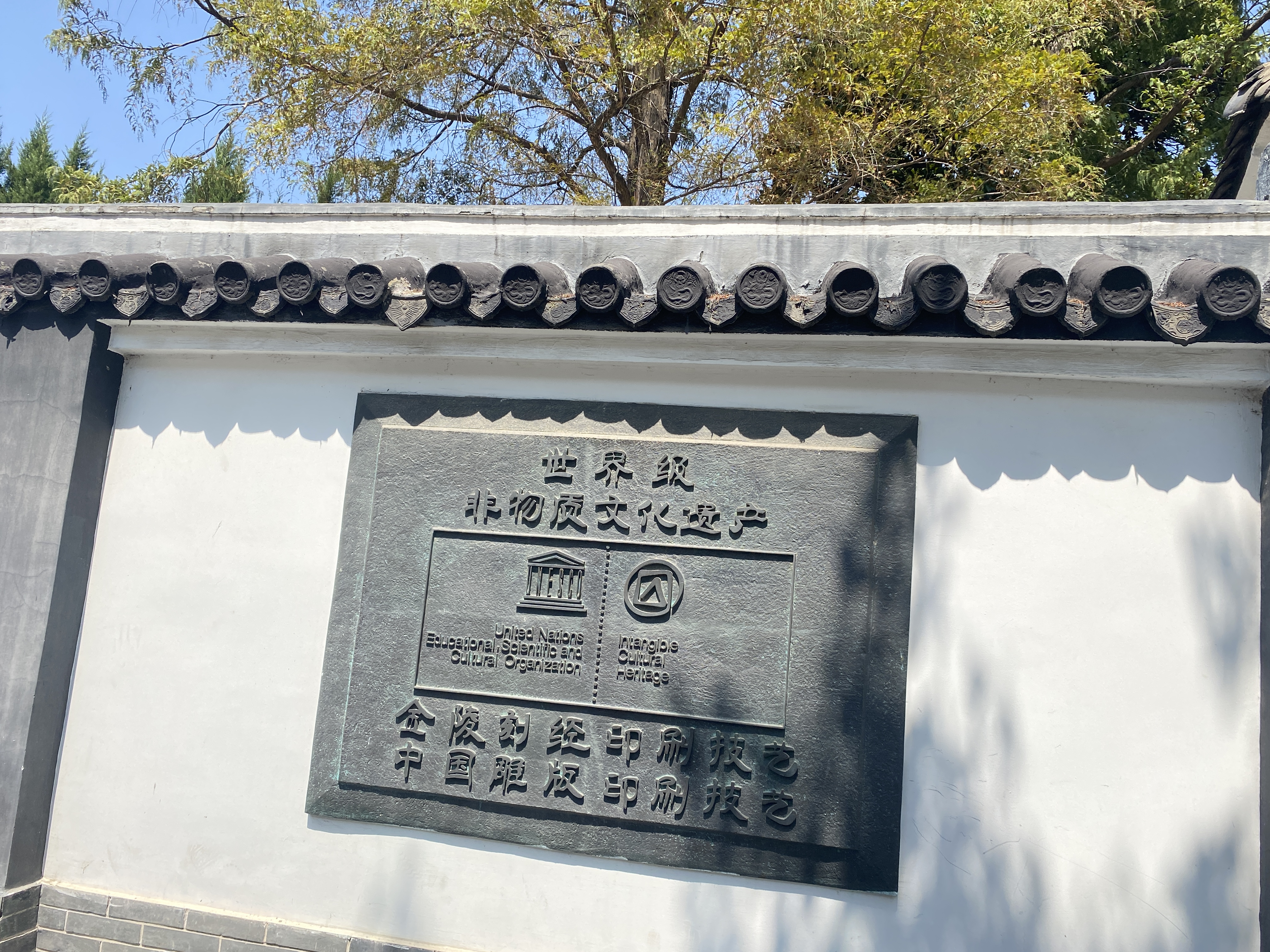
Commemorative plaque for the woodblock printing tradition

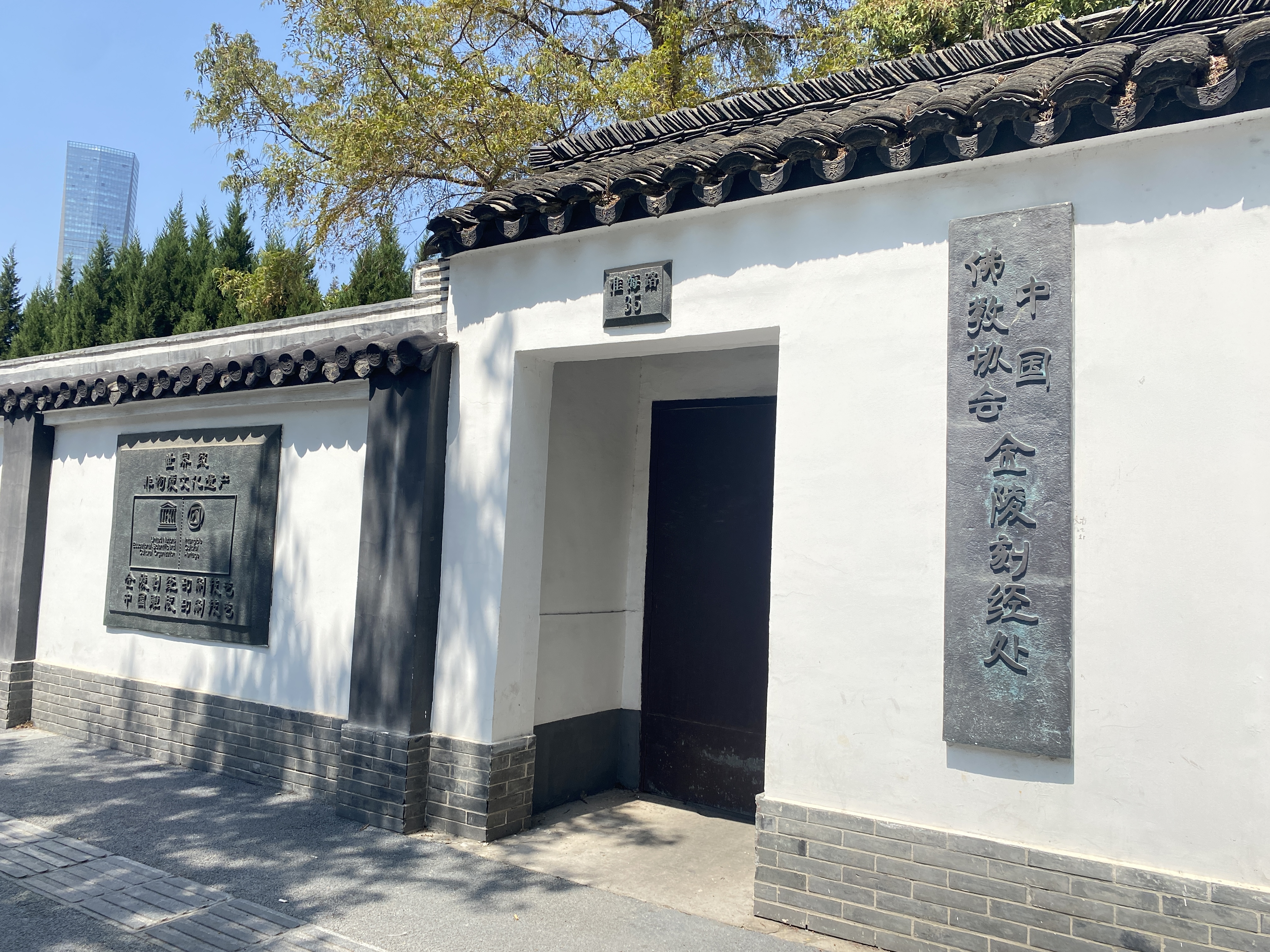
Entrance to the press
