= Adam Rankin Alexander =

American politician

Member of the U.S. House of Representatives from Tennessee's 9th district
- In office March 4, 1823 – March 3, 1827
- Preceded by: District created
- Succeeded by: Davy Crockett

Personal details
- Born: November 1, 1781 Rockbridge County, Virginia
- Died: November 1, 1848 (aged 67) Marshall County, Mississippi
- Party: Jacksonian Republican
- Spouse(s): Leah Reagan Alexander; Dorothea Alexander (Slave)
- Children: Ebeneza Alexander; Mary Melissa Alexander; William Reagan Alexander; Jane Maria Alexander; James Henry Alexander; Margaret Ann Alexander; Joseph Brown Porter Alexander; Benjamin Newton Alexander; Martha Hill Alexander; Samuel Blair Houston Alexander; John Bell Pinkney Alexander; Bettie Alexander (Slave); Aaron Alexander (Slave)
- Profession: politician

Adam Rankin Alexander (November 1, 1781 – November 1, 1848) was an American politician who represented Tennessee in the United States House of Representatives.

== Biography ==
Alexander was born in Rockbridge County, Virginia, on November 1, 1781, to Oliver and Mary (née Craig) Alexander. Oliver fought in the American Revolutionary War, and reputedly served in George Washington's company in the 1755 Braddock Expedition. Mary is recorded as being Irish. Educator Eben Alexander was his grandson.

== Career ==
During the War of 1812, Alexander served from October 4, 1813, to January 4, 1814. He served as a private in Captain William Dooley's Company; and as a Lieutenant and Quartermaster in Thomas McCrory's 2nd Regiment, West Tennessee Militia.

He married Leah Reagan, a Virginia native, on March 26, 1805, in Blount County, Tennessee.

Alexander worked as a surveyor, and afterwards, he was the register of the land office for the tenth surveyors' district in Madison County, Tennessee. He was a member of the court of Madison County in 1821. He became a member of the Tennessee Senate representing Maury County in 1817, serving until 1819.

Elected to represent Tennessee's newly established 9th District as a Jacksonian Republican to the Eighteenth Congress and as a Jacksonian to the succeeding Congress, Alexander served as a U.S. Representative from March 4, 1823, to March 3, 1827. He was an unsuccessful candidate for re-election to the Twentieth Congress in 1827, and lost his seat to frontiersman Davy Crockett.

Alexander represented Shelby County at the Tennessee constitutional convention in 1834. He was a member of the Tennessee House of Representatives representing Shelby County from 1841 and 1845.

== Death ==
Alexander died on November 1, 1848, aged 67, in Marshall County, Mississippi. He is buried at Alexander-Pryor Family Cemetery, Laws Hill, Marshall County, Mississippi.

U.S. House of Representatives
Preceded by District created	Member of the U.S. House of Representatives from Tennessee's 9th congressional district 1823–1827	Succeeded by Davy Crockett
