= Martha Meredith Read =

American author

- Born: 1773; Philadelphia
- Died: March 1816; Harrisburg
- Occupation: Writer
- Spouse: John Read
- Children: John M. Read
- Parents: Samuel Meredith (father); Margaret Cadwalader (mother)

Martha Meredith Read (1773 – March 1816) was an American novelist and feminist author. She published two novels and a feminist tract, "A Second Vindication of the Rights of Women" (1801).

== Life and career ==
Martha Meredith Read was born in 1773 in Philadelphia, the eldest daughter of Samuel Meredith and Margaret Cadwalader Meredith. In 1816 she married John Read. They had five children, including John M. Read.

In both of Read's novels, a virtuous teenage female protagonist suffers various tribulations in Philadelphia before triumph and marriage.

Monima, or the Beggar Girl (1802) is set in 1790s Philadelphia. A teenage Monima Fontanbleu must care for her elderly father, once a planter in Saint Domingo, and suffers from a difficulty to find work and the plotting of her former employer. The downfall of proud and wealthy characters in this novel might have been inspired by Federalist relatives of Read who lost influence upon the election of Thomas Jefferson.

Margaretta; or, the Intricacies of the Heart (1807) begins in Elkton, Maryland but its protagonist soon relocates to Philadelphia, then Santo Domingo, and finally England. She is the subject to the attention of a pair of rakes, imprisoned on a plantation, and nearly marries a man whom she discovers is her own biological father.

The title of her essay "A Second Vindication of the Rights of Women" (1801) echoes Mary Wollstonecraft's seminal A Vindication of the Rights of Woman (1792) and its content concurs with much of Wollstonecraft's work. Only two sections of her essay survive.

Her first novel, parts of her second novel, and "Vindication" were all serialized in Isaac Ralston's short-lived newspaper The Ladies' Monitor.

Martha Meredith Read died in March 1816 in Harrisburg.

== Bibliography ==
- Monima, or the Beggar Girl (1802)
- Margaretta; or, the Intricacies of the Heart (1807)
