= John M. Read =

American judge and politician

John Read
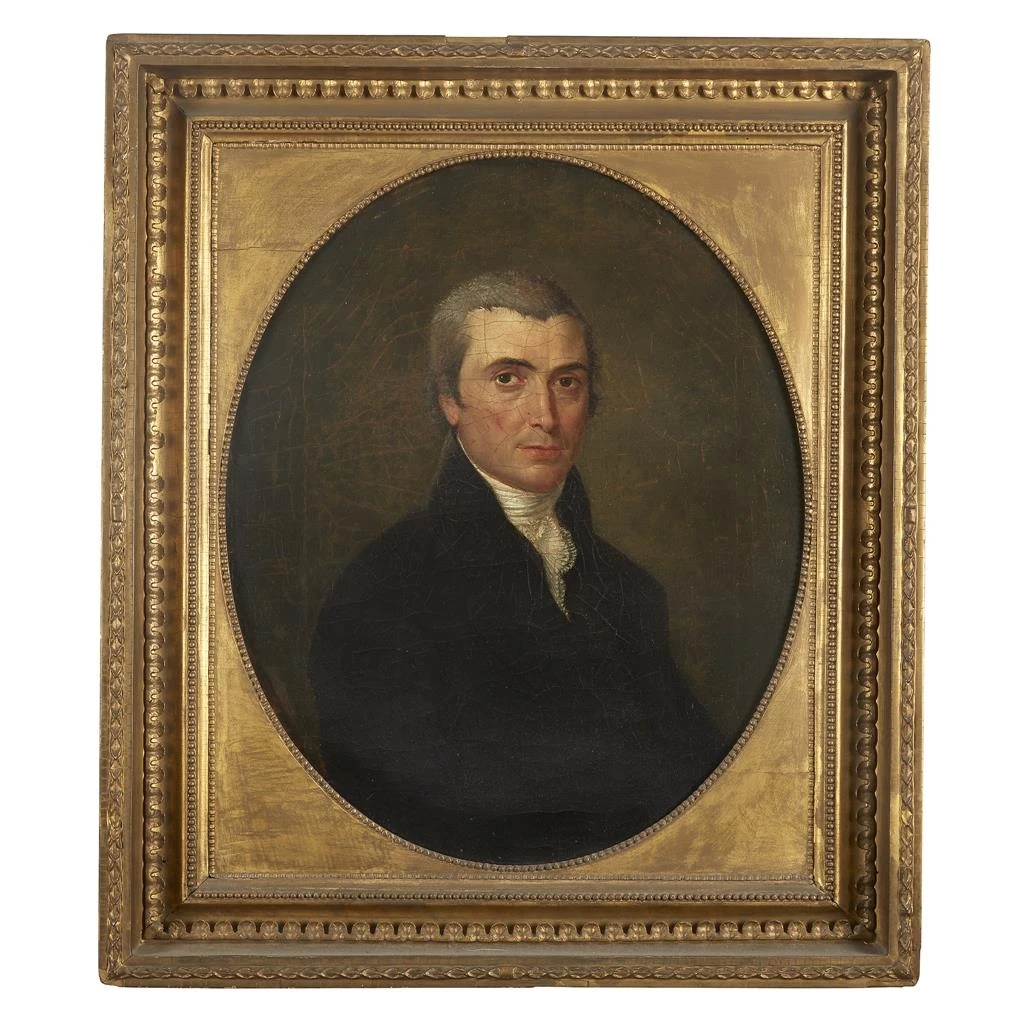

Attorney General of Pennsylvania
- In office June 23, 1846 – December 18, 1846
- Governor: Francis Shunk
- Preceded by: John Kane
- Succeeded by: Benjamin Champneys

Personal details
- Born: July 21, 1797 Philadelphia, Pennsylvania, U.S.
- Died: November 29, 1874 (aged 77) Philadelphia, Pennsylvania, U.S.
- Party: Federalist (Before 1824); Democratic (1828–1848); Free Soil (1848–1854); Republican (1854–1874)
- Spouse(s): Priscilla Marshall (1828–1841); Amelia Thompson (1855–1874)
- Children: Meredith
- Education: University of Pennsylvania (BA)

John Meredith Read Sr. (July 21, 1797 – November 29, 1874) was an American lawyer, jurist, and politician from Philadelphia, Pennsylvania. He was one of the founders of the Republican Party and chief justice of the Pennsylvania Supreme Court.

== Early life and education ==
Read John was born on Chestnut Street across the street from Independence Hall in Philadelphia, the eldest son of lawyer John Read and Martha Meredith Read. Both of his grandfathers (George Read and Samuel Meredith) had served in the Continental Congress. After an education at home, Read graduated from the University of Pennsylvania, then read law, and was admitted to the bar in 1818. He started a law practice in Philadelphia.

== Political career ==
Read began his political career when he was elected to the Pennsylvania House of Representatives in 1822. He served until 1824 while remaining in the private practice of law. After this he served on the Philadelphia City Council, and for several years was the city's solicitor. Although his family had been Federalists, he became an ardent supporter of the Free Soil wing of the Democratic Party.

From 1837 to 1841, Read was the United States Attorney for the Eastern District of Pennsylvania. In 1845, President John Tyler nominated him to the Supreme Court of the United States; but, his earlier stance against the expansion of slavery into the territories caused the southern Democratic Senators to oppose his nomination and it was withdrawn. From June until December 1845 he served as the Attorney General of Pennsylvania.

In 1863, he was elected as a member to the American Philosophical Society.

Read became an early supporter and organizer for the Republican Party. When they won in their first statewide races in 1858, Read was elected to the state supreme court. He then served until December 2, 1872, the last year as chief justice. When the Republicans held their first national convention at Philadelphia in 1856, Read was a convention organizer and delivered the convention keynote address. At the 1860 Republican Convention in Chicago, he received one vote on the first ballot for presidential nominee; still, he supported Lincoln as the nominee.

== Personal life ==
Read was married twice, first to Priscilla Marshall in 1828. They had five children, one of whom, J. Meredith Read, was a noted American diplomat. After Priscilla's death, Read married Amelia Thompson in 1855.

Read was a member of the Episcopal Church and a Freemason. He was grand master of the Grand Lodge of Pennsylvania from 1837 to 1838.

Read died at home in Philadelphia in 1874.

Legal offices
Preceded by John Kane	Attorney General of Pennsylvania; 1846	Succeeded by Benjamin Champneys
