= Pinecrest (Elkins, West Virginia) =

Historic house in West Virginia, United States

- U.S. National Register of Historic Places
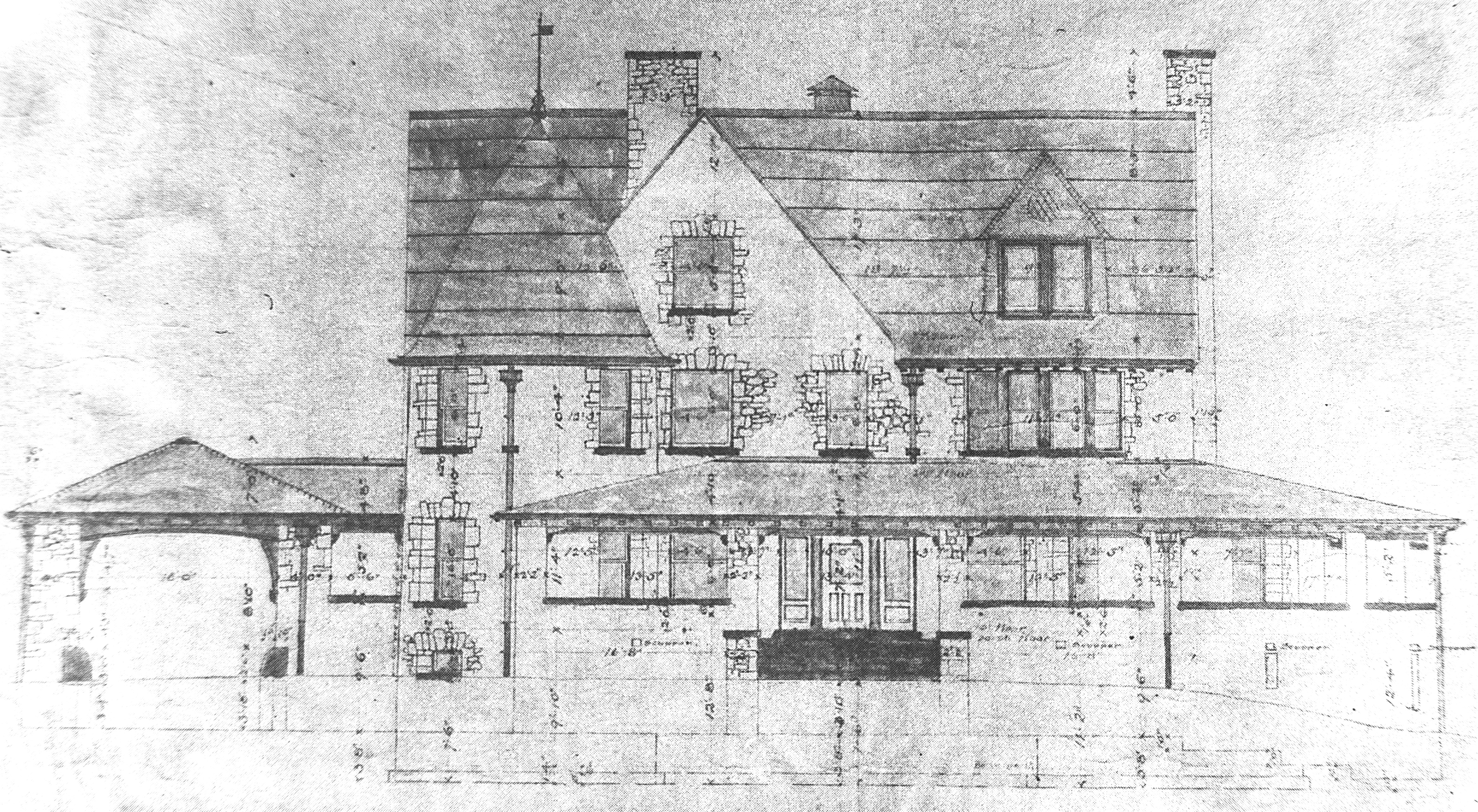
- Front elevation drawing

- Location within West Virginia Location within the United States
- Location: Kerens Hill, Elkins, West Virginia
- Coordinates: 38°55′53″N 79°51′11″W
- Area: 1 acre (0.40 ha)
- Built: 1892
- Architect: Peaboby & Stearns
- Architectural style: Shingle Style
- NRHP reference No.: 79002600
- Added to NRHP: December 11, 1979

"Pinecrest", also known as the Richard C. Kerens House and Kerens-Spears House, is a historic home located at Elkins, Randolph County, West Virginia. It was built in 1892 to a design by the Boston architecture firm Peabody & Stearns as a summer home for Richard C. Kerens (1842–1916). It is a large sandstone dwelling in a modified Shingle Style. It has an asymmetrical shape with gable-fronted sections in the main portion, a hip roof on the servants wing, and two cone-shaped tops on rounded turrets. It features a front porch that extends well beyond the exterior wall and curves along a single-story rounded projection at the east corner.

It was listed on the National Register of Historic Places in 1979.

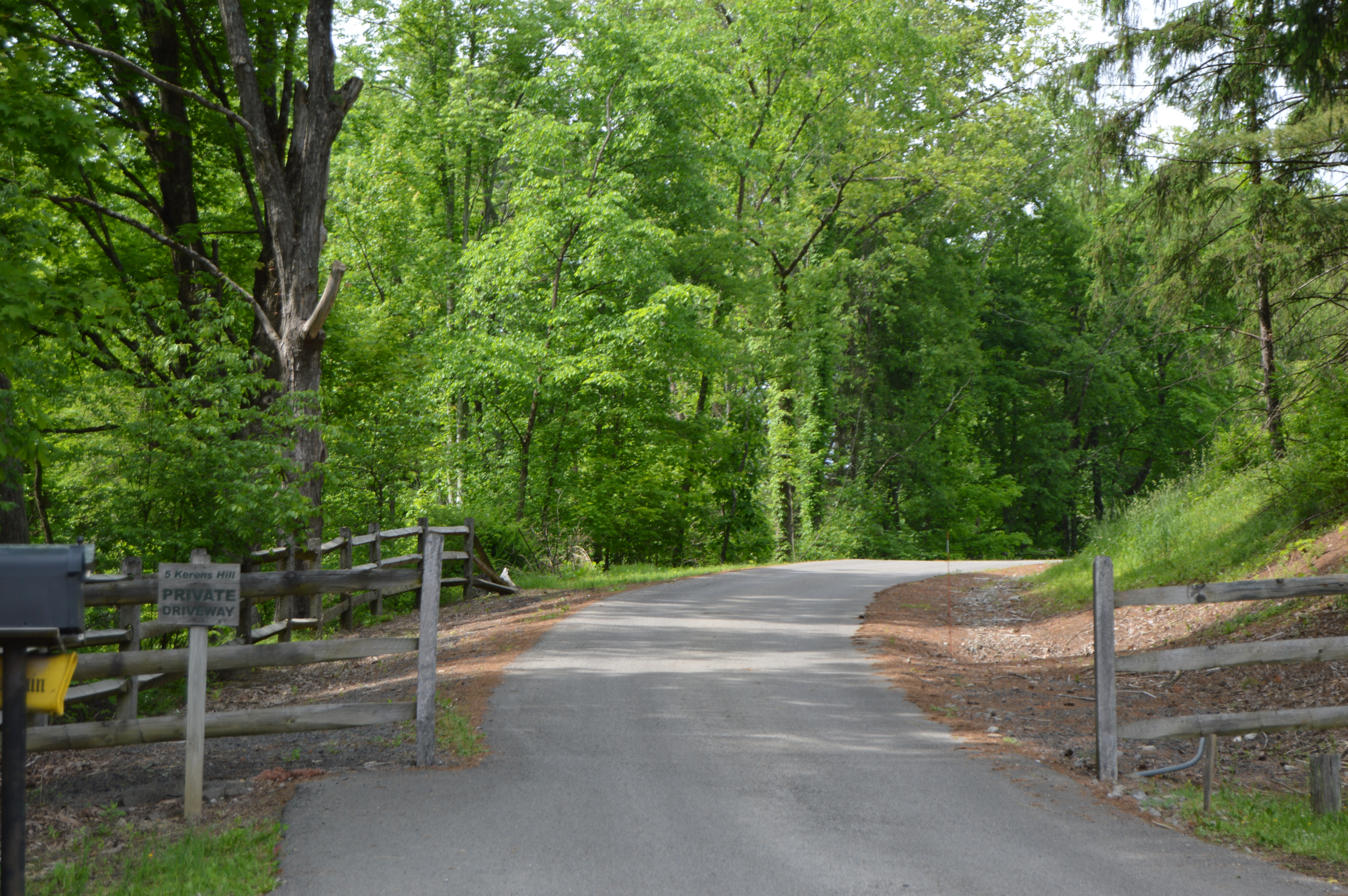
Entrance to property

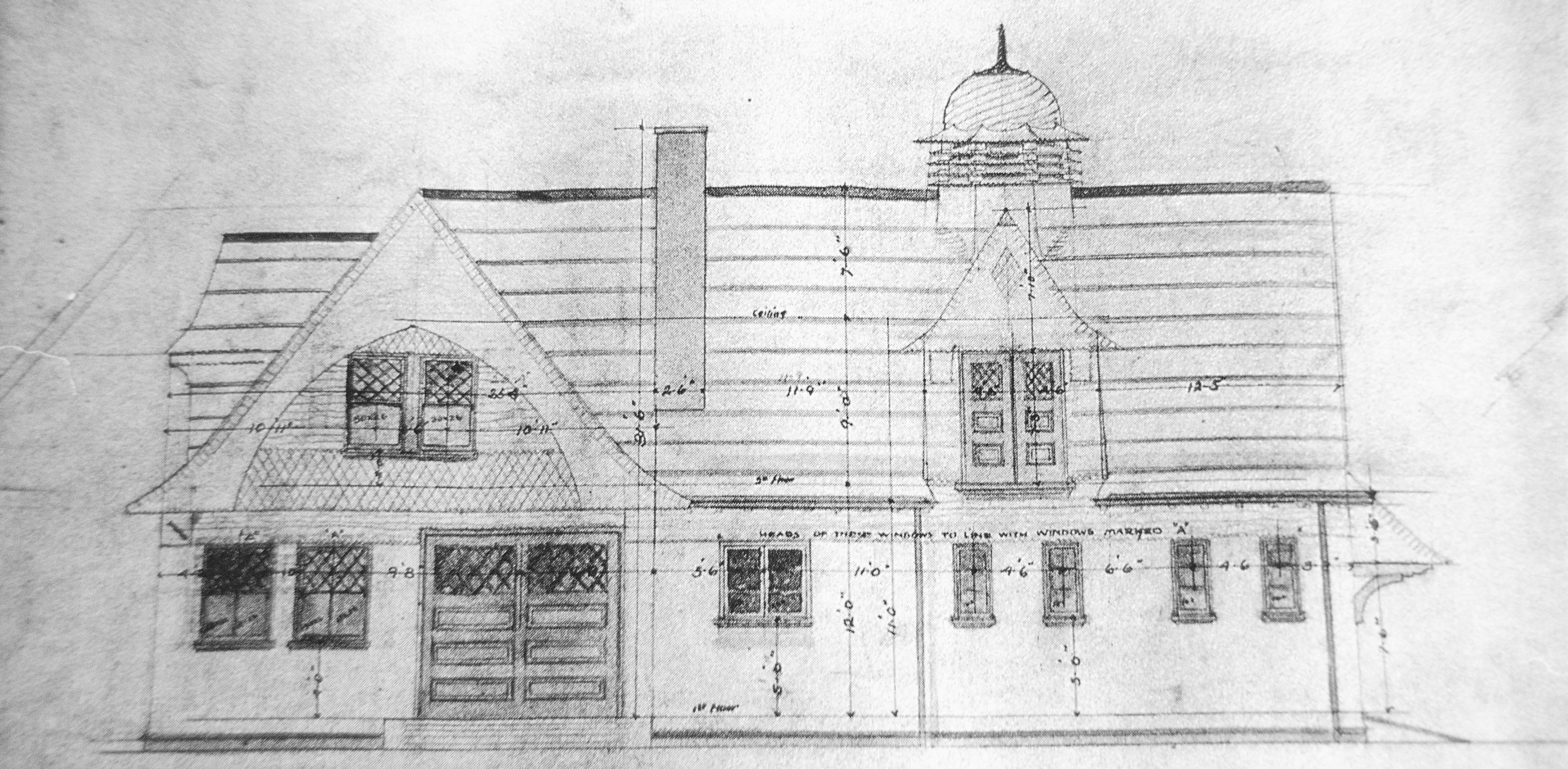
Stable elevation drawing
