= Charles Spencer Francis =

American diplomat and newspaper editor (1853-1911)

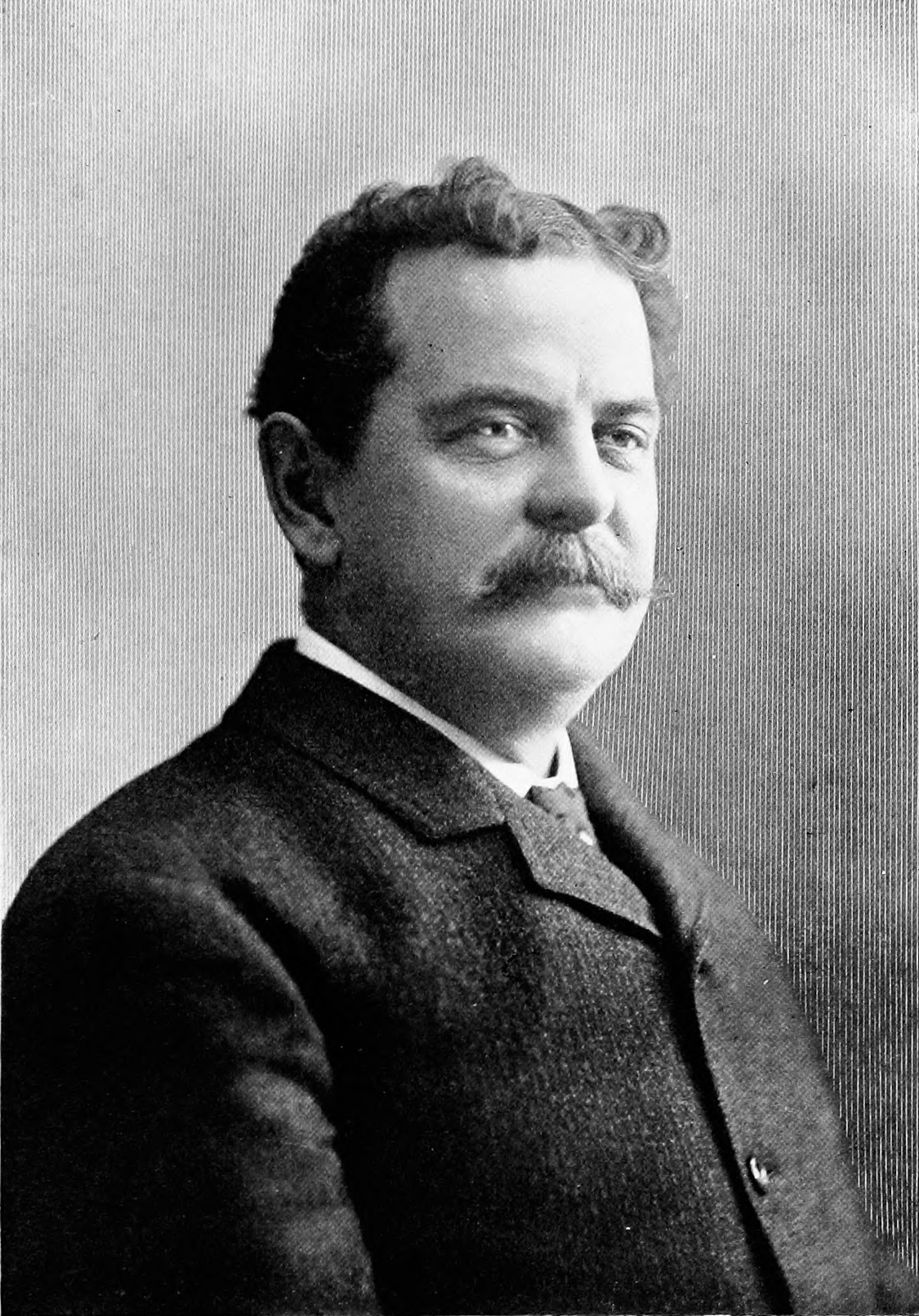
- Francis, circa 1901

21st United States Ambassador to Austria-Hungary
- In office May 29, 1906 – April 1, 1910
- President: Theodore Roosevelt; William Howard Taft
- Preceded by: Bellamy Storer
- Succeeded by: Richard C. Kerens

United States Minister to Romania
- In office October 16, 1901 – December 24, 1902
- President: Theodore Roosevelt
- Preceded by: Arthur Sherburne Hardy
- Succeeded by: John B. Jackson

United States Minister to Serbia
- In office May 13, 1901 – December 24, 1902
- President: William McKinley; Theodore Roosevelt
- Preceded by: Arthur Sherburne Hardy
- Succeeded by: John B. Jackson

United States Minister to Greece
- In office March 2, 1901 – December 24, 1902
- President: William McKinley; Theodore Roosevelt
- Preceded by: Arthur Sherburne Hardy
- Succeeded by: John B. Jackson

Personal details
- Born: June 17, 1853 Troy, New York, U.S.
- Died: December 1, 1911 (aged 58) Troy, New York, U.S.
- Resting place: Oakwood Cemetery; 42°45′50″N 73°39′59″W
- Party: Republican
- Spouse: Alice Evans (m. 1878)
- Parents: John M. Francis (father); Harriet E. Tucker (mother)
- Education: Cornell University (B.S.)
- Occupation: Newspaper editor, diplomat

Military service
- Allegiance: United States
- Branch/service: New York State National Guard
- Rank: Colonel

Charles Spencer Francis (June 17, 1853 – December 1, 1911) was an American diplomat and newspaper editor.

== Early life and education ==
The son of diplomat and newspaper publisher John M. Francis and Harriet E. Tucker, Charles Spencer Francis was born on June 17, 1853. He studied at Cornell University from 1870 to 1871, before joining his father in Greece as his secretary. With his mission completed, Francis returned to the United States and to Cornell in 1874.

At Cornell, Francis proved to be an excellent rower, setting the world record in intercollegiate single scull competition in 1876 (which stood long after his death, up until his grandson also attended Cornell). He graduated from Cornell the next year with a Bachelor of Science degree.

== Newspaperman ==
He went to work for his father's newspaper, The Troy Times, as a reporter, and worked his way up to the editor's desk. He bought a stake in the paper, then made it an equal one. Upon his father's death in 1897, Francis took over the paper entirely.

== Diplomatic career ==
Francis, a Republican, was appointed to his father's old post of United States Minister to Greece, Serbia, and Romania in 1900, under President William McKinley. Two years later, Francis resigned to attend to his newspaper and other business interests.

He returned to diplomacy in 1906, when President Theodore Roosevelt nominated Francis to another of his father's old posts: that of United States Ambassador to Austria-Hungary; upon the recall of Bellamy Storer. The Emperor, Franz Joseph, accepted; and his appointment was announced by the Foreign Ministry on March 28, 1906. Two months later, Francis presented his credentials.

He was officially introduced to the Emperor's court on January 30, 1907. Three years later, on the eve of his departure, the Emperor received him in a farewell audience.

He was replaced by Richard C. Kerens.

== Other activities ==
A member of Zeta Psi, he served in the New York State National Guard under Joseph Bradford Carr, ultimately attaining the rank of colonel. He was also a vice president of the American Scenic and Historic Preservation Society, and a member of Sons of the Revolution.

In 1903, Francis became a member of the Board of Regents of the University of the State of New York, which he resigned upon his nomination as ambassador.

== Personal life ==
Francis married Alice Evans, the daughter of a Cornell professor, on May 23, 1878; and they had five children, two sons and three daughters.

Francis died from myocarditis on December 1, 1911, and was buried at Oakwood Cemetery.

Diplomatic posts
Preceded by Arthur Sherburne Hardy	United States Minister to Greece; 1901 - 1902	Succeeded by John B. Jackson
Preceded by Arthur Sherburne Hardy	United States Minister to Serbia; 1901 - 1902	Succeeded by John B. Jackson
Preceded by Arthur Sherburne Hardy	United States Minister to Romania; 1901 - 1902	Succeeded by John B. Jackson
Preceded by Bellamy Storer	United States Ambassador to Austria-Hungary; 1906 - 1910	Succeeded by Richard C. Kerens
