= Charles K. Tuckerman =

American diplomat and writer (1827 – 1896)

Charles Keating Tuckerman
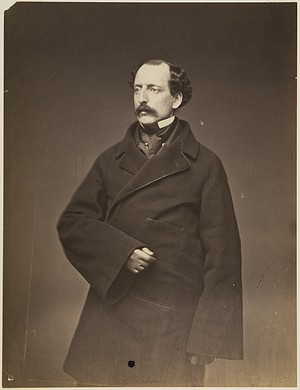

United States Ambassador to Greece
- In office March 11, 1868 – November 4, 1871
- President: Andrew Johnson; Ulysses S. Grant
- Preceded by: Created
- Succeeded by: John M. Francis

Personal details
- Born: March 11, 1827 Boston, Massachusetts, U.S.
- Died: February 26, 1896 (aged 68) Florence, Italy
- Spouse: Mary Fleming
- Relations: Charles K. Tuckerman (brother); Edward Tuckerman (cousin); Samuel P. Tuckerman (cousin); Frederick Tuckerman (cousin)
- Children: Arthur Lyman Tuckerman
- Parent(s): Henry Harris Tuckerman; Ruth Lyman Keating
- Education: Boston Latin School

Charles Keating Tuckerman (March 11, 1827 – February 26, 1896) was an American diplomat, author and the first American minister resident to Greece.

== Early life and family ==
Charles Keating Tuckerman was born on March 11, 1827, in Boston, Massachusetts. He was educated at Boston Latin School.

His first cousins included Edward Tuckerman, the botanist, Samuel Parkman Tuckerman, the composer, and Frederick Goddard Tuckerman, the poet.

== Career ==
After spending his 20s working overseas, he returned to the United States in 1856, settling in New York City, where he directed the New York Institution for the Blind.

President Andrew Johnson asked Tuckerman in 1867 to be the American minister resident to Greece, because of Tuckerman's experience overseas. The Senate refused initially to confirm Tuckerman's nomination, but he was officially appointed on March 11, 1868, and presented his credentials on June 16, 1868. Tuckerman was the first American diplomat ever posted to Greece. While there, he helped improve trading relations between Greece and the United States. His resignation in 1871 was delayed for six months by President Ulysses S. Grant, who wanted to keep Tuckerman on the job and presented recall on November 4, 1871. Tuckerman returned to the United States after his Greek posting.

=== Writings ===
Tuckerman wrote three books:

- The Greeks of To-day (published in 1872 by G.P. Putnam & Sons)
- Miscellaneous Poems (published in 1880 by Moxon, Saunders and Co.)
- Personal Recollections of Notable People at Home and Abroad (published in 1895 in two volumes by Dodd Mead)

== Personal life ==
In 1858, Tuckerman married Mary Fleming. Together they had:

- Arthur Lyman Tuckerman (1861–1892), an architect who wrote three books: A Short History of Architecture (1887), Design (1891), and Selections of Works of Architecture and Sculpture Belonging Chiefly to the Period of the Renaissance in Italy (1891).

Tuckerman died in Florence, Italy, on February 26, 1896.

Diplomatic posts
Preceded by Created	United States Ambassador to Greece; 1868–1871	Succeeded by John M. Francis
