= Bellamy Storer (ambassador) =

American politician and diplomat (1847-1922)

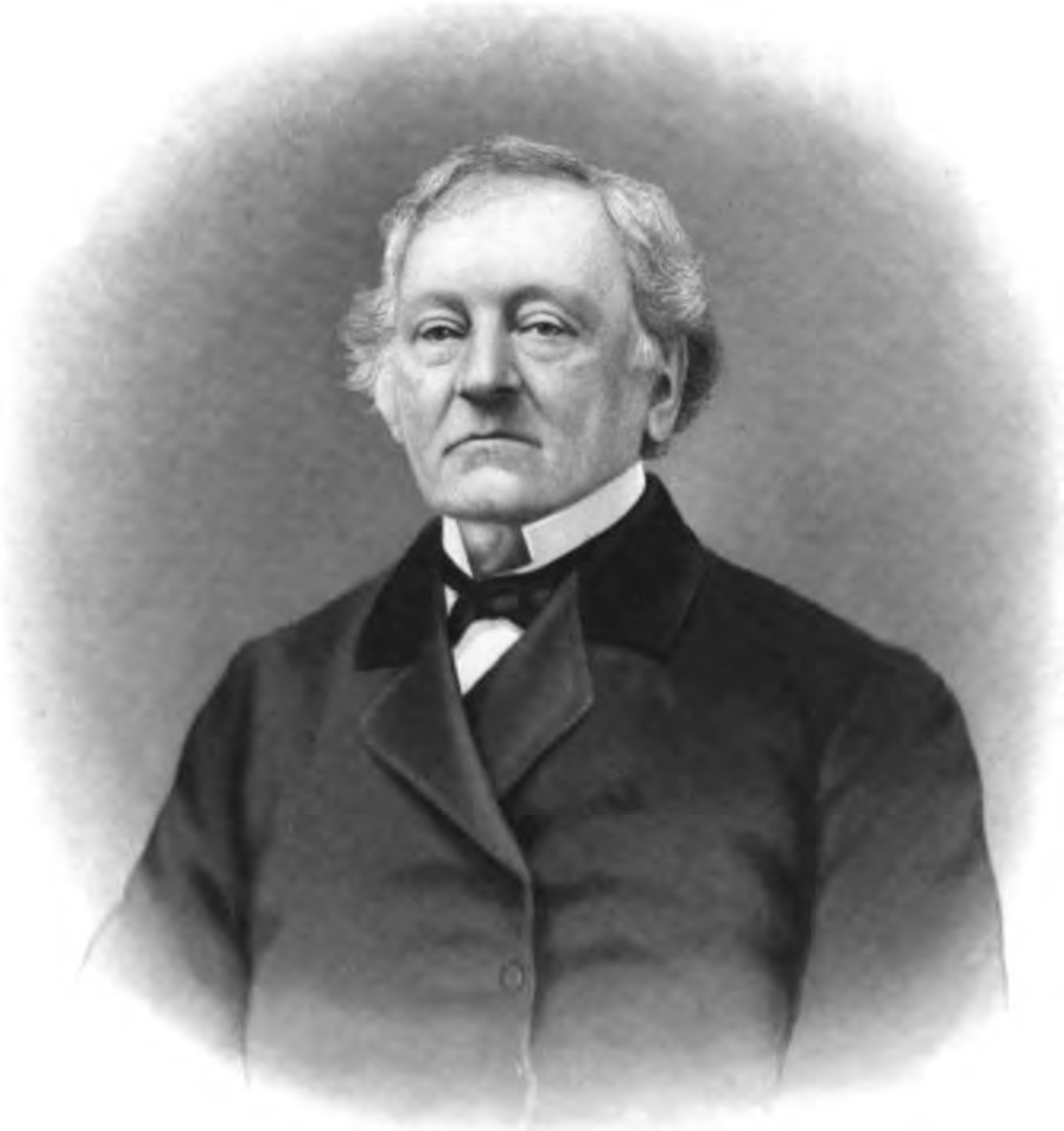

20th United States Ambassador to Austria-Hungary
- In office January 3, 1903 – February 8, 1906
- President: Theodore Roosevelt
- Preceded by: Robert S. McCormick
- Succeeded by: Charles Spencer Francis

32nd United States Minister to Spain
- In office June 16, 1899 – December 10, 1902
- President: William McKinley; Theodore Roosevelt
- Preceded by: Stewart L. Woodford
- Succeeded by: Arthur Sherburne Hardy

United States Minister to Belgium
- In office July 21, 1897 – May 31, 1899
- President: William McKinley
- Preceded by: James S. Ewing
- Succeeded by: Lawrence Townsend

Member of the U.S. House of Representatives from Ohio's 1st district
- In office March 4, 1891 – March 3, 1895
- Preceded by: Benjamin Butterworth
- Succeeded by: Charles Phelps Taft

Personal details
- Born: August 28, 1847 Cincinnati, Ohio, U.S.
- Died: November 12, 1922 (aged 75) Paris, France
- Resting place: Le Cimetiere Neuf, Marvejols, France
- Party: Republican
- Spouse: Maria Longworth Nichols Storer
- Education: Harvard University; Cincinnati Law School
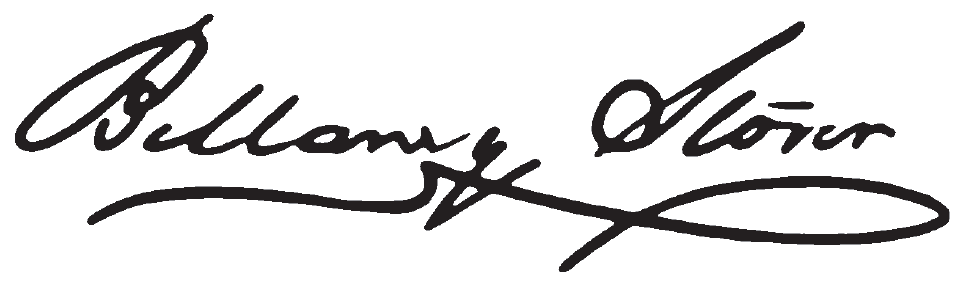
- Signature

Bellamy Storer (August 28, 1847 – November 12, 1922) was an American lawyer and politician who served two terms as a U.S. representative from Ohio from 1891 to 1895. He later served as a diplomat for the United States, serving as minister or ambassador to Belgium, Spain, and Austria.

== Biography ==
Storer was born in Cincinnati, Ohio, the son of Bellamy Storer (1796–1875) and uncle of Nicholas Longworth. Storer attended the common schools in Cincinnati and Dixwell's Private Latin School, Boston, Massachusetts. He was graduated from Harvard University in 1867 and from the law school of Cincinnati College (now University of Cincinnati College of Law) in 1869.

He was admitted to the bar in 1869 and commenced practice in Cincinnati. He served as assistant United States attorney for the southern district of Ohio in 1869 and 1870.

Storer's wife, Maria Longworth Nichols Storer, was the founder of Rookwood Pottery located in Cincinnati, Ohio. They married in 1886. Her Cincinnati connections were a great boost to Storer's standing in the city.

=== Congress ===
Storer was elected as a Republican to the Fifty-second and Fifty-third Congresses (March 4, 1891 – March 3, 1895). He was not a candidate for renomination in 1894, but resumed the practice of law. He was Assistant Secretary of State in 1897.

== Diplomatic posts ==
Storer promoted William McKinley in his campaigns for governor of Ohio and president of the United States. This service was remembered in McKinley's assignment of him to be Envoy Extraordinary and Minister Plenipotentiary to Belgium from May 4, 1897, to April 11, 1899. He was later assumed the same post for Spain from April 12, 1899, to September 26, 1902. His friend Theodore Roosevelt then assigned him as the ambassador to Austria-Hungary from 1903 to March 1906.

Although Roosevelt asked Storer to intervene with Pope Leo XIII regarding a cardinalate for John Ireland, Roosevelt later had second thoughts, and Storer's activity on Ireland's behalf led to his dismissal from the Austria-Hungary post. Storer converted to Roman Catholicism from Episcopal Church in 1896.

== Last years and death ==
Afterwards Storer resumed the practice of law. He died in Paris, France, November 12, 1922, and was interred in Le Cimetiere Neuf in Marvejols.

== Sources ==
- Media related to Bellamy Storer (1847-1922) at Wikimedia Commons
- United States Congress. "Bellamy Storer (id: S000970)". Biographical Directory of the United States Congress.
- Wilson, J. G.; Fiske, J., eds. (1900). "Storer, Bellamy (diplomat)" . Appletons' Cyclopædia of American Biography. New York: D. Appleton.

U.S. House of Representatives
Preceded by Benjamin Butterworth	Member of the U.S. House of Representatives from Ohio's 1st congressional district 1891-1895	Succeeded by Charles P. Taft
Diplomatic posts
Preceded by James Stevenson Ewing	United States Ambassador to Belgium; 1897-1899	Succeeded by Lawrence Townsend
Preceded by Stewart L. Woodford	United States Ambassador to Spain; 1899-1902	Succeeded by Arthur S. Hardy
Preceded by Robert S. McCormick	United States Ambassador to Austria-Hungary; 1902-1906	Succeeded by Charles S. Francis
