= Arthur Sherburne Hardy =

American diplomat, engineer, educator and editor (1847-1930)

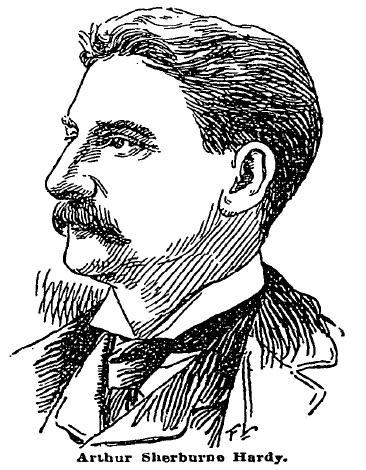
- Portrait from article "Arthur Sherburne Hardy, Poet, Soldier, Novelist, Mathematician, Editor" in The New York Times, November 19, 1893.

33rd United States Minister to Spain
- In office March 2, 1903 – May 1, 1905
- President: Theodore Roosevelt
- Preceded by: Bellamy Storer
- Succeeded by: William Miller Collier

United States Minister to Switzerland
- In office April 3, 1901 – January 29, 1903
- President: William McKinley; Theodore Roosevelt
- Preceded by: John George Alexander Leishman
- Succeeded by: David Jayne Hill

United States Minister to Romania
- In office July 14, 1900 – March 13, 1901
- President: William McKinley
- Preceded by: William Woodville Rockhill
- Succeeded by: Charles Spencer Francis

United States Minister to Serbia
- In office June 24, 1900 – March 2, 1901
- President: William McKinley
- Preceded by: William Woodville Rockhill
- Succeeded by: Charles Spencer Francis

United States Minister to Greece
- In office October 30, 1899 – January 25, 1901
- President: William McKinley
- Preceded by: William Woodville Rockhill
- Succeeded by: Charles Spencer Francis

United States Minister to Iran
- In office November 27, 1897 – April 22, 1899
- President: William McKinley
- Preceded by: Alexander McDonald
- Succeeded by: Herbert Wolcott Bowen

Personal details
- Born: August 13, 1847 Andover, Massachusetts
- Died: March 14, 1930 (aged 82) Woodstock, Connecticut
- Occupation: Engineer, educator, editor, diplomat, novelist, poet

Arthur Sherburne Hardy (August 13, 1847 – March 14, 1930) was an American engineer, educator, editor, diplomat, novelist, and poet.

== Early life and education ==
Hardy was born in 1847 in Andover, Massachusetts, the son of Alpheus and Susan W. (Holmes) Hardy. He received his elementary school education abroad and thus gained an exposure to languages. He attended Phillips Academy and completed one year at Amherst College before becoming a cadet at the United States Military Academy at West Point in 1865, where he excelled in languages. He graduated tenth in the class of 1869 and was commissioned a second lieutenant of artillery. Among his classmates who served as general officers were Samuel Escue Tillman, William P. Duvall, Earl Dennison Thomas, Charles Morton, and William W. Robinson Jr. Among his prominent classmates who did not attain general's rank were Eric Bergland, John Gregory Bourke, and James Ezekiel Porter.

Hardy's first duty was as assistant instructor of artillery tactics at West Point from July 6 to August 28 in the summer of 1869. He was then stationed in Fort Jefferson in the Dry Tortugas in Florida. In this period after the Civil War, there was little chance of advancement in the Army so, after consulting with General William T. Sherman, he resigned in 1870.

== Career ==
Hardy served as a short period as an engineer locating routes for railroads. Then he became a professor of mathematics at Grinnell College where he stayed until 1873. Then he became professor of civil engineering in the Chandler Scientific School at Dartmouth College, accepting the position on the condition that he be allowed to serve abroad for a year. He went to Paris where he followed the course of the Ecole des Ponts et Chausees as an eleve externe and simultaneously attended as many of the lectures as he could at the École des Beaux-Arts (School of Fine Arts), Sorbonne, and Conservatoire National des Arts et Métiers (National Conservatory of Crafts and Industries). In 1878 he obtained the chair of mathematics at Dartmouth and served until 1893.

According to "The Early History of the [Dartmouth] Mathematics Department 1769–1961":

The one example of mathematical competency was furnished by Arthur Sherburne Hardy who wrote a book on quaternions, an adequate, if not inspiring text. It was something for Dartmouth to offer a course in such an abstruse field, and the course was actually given a few times when a student and an instructor could be found simultaneously. In 1893 Professor Hardy failed in his ambition to be elected President of Dartmouth College. He resigned, entered the diplomatic service, and was successively Ambassador to Turkey, Greece, Switzerland, and Spain. He was also a novelist with a national reputation, and if a modern generation fails to find in his books the values which their great-grandfathers found, the fact remains that his books were best-sellers in their day.

While teaching at Dartmouth, Hardy helped redesign the College Park behind his house. On his departure, he sold his house to the incoming President William Jewett Tucker (the house later became the official presidential residence, a medical laboratory, and the home of a chapter of the Delta Gamma sorority before being demolished.)

In 1893 Hardy became the editor of Cosmopolitan magazine, in which capacity he worked until 1895.

Subsequent to his academic career and publishing career, Hardy was appointed as the United States ambassador to several countries: he first served as United States Minister to Persia, from 1897 to 1899; he then served as United States Minister to Greece, from 1899 to 1901 (this post included serving as United States Ambassador to Romania and Serbia, as well). Later, he served as United States Ambassador to Switzerland, in 1901, and finally as United States Ambassador to Spain, from 1902 to 1905.

Hardy died on March 14, 1930, in Woodstock, Connecticut. He was buried at Woodstock Hill Cemetery.

== Partial bibliography ==
=== Novels ===
- But Yet a Woman (1883): "By a hitherto unknown writer" was "regarded as the hit of season of 1883"
- The Wind of Destiny (1886)
- Passe Rose (1889)
- His Daughter First (1903)
- Helen (1916)
- No. 13 Rue du Bon Diable (1917)

=== Short stories ===
- Diane and Her Friends (collection, 1914)

=== Children's fiction ===
- Aurélie (1912)

=== Poetry ===
- Francesca of Rimini (1878)
- Dualty (1893)
- Songs of Two (1900)

=== Nonfiction ===
==== Textbooks ====
- Elements of Quaternions (1881)
- Imaginary Quantities (1881), a translation of a French treatise by Jean-Robert Argand
- New Methods in Topographical Surveying (1883)
- Elements of Analytic Geometry (1889)
- Elements of Calculus (1890)

==== Biography ====
- Life and Letters of Joseph Hardy Neesima (1891)
- Things Remembered (1923)

== Sources ==
- United States Department of State: List of ambassadors
- Alexander Sherbune Hardy at the Department of State Office of the Historian
- The Political Graveyard: Arthur Sherburne Hardy
- Dartmouth College: The Early History of the Mathematics Department
- United States Military Academy: Biography
- United States Embassy in Madrid: Former U.S. Ambassadors And Presidential Representatives To Spain

Diplomatic posts
Preceded by Alexander McDonald	United States Minister to Persia; 1897–1899	Succeeded by William P. Lord
Preceded by William W. Rockhill	United States Minister to Greece also accredited to Romania and Serbia; 1899-1901	Succeeded by Charles Spencer Francis
Preceded by John G.A. Leishman	United States Minister to Switzerland; April 3, 1901–January 29, 1903	Succeeded by Charles Paige Bryan
Preceded by Bellamy Storer	United States Minister to Spain; 1903–1905	Succeeded by William Miller Collier
