= Eben Alexander (educator) =

American scholar and ambassador (1851–1910)

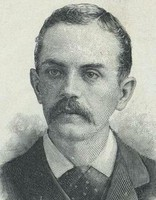
- Born: March 9, 1851; Knoxville
- Died: March 11, 1910
- Education: Yale University
- Occupations: Diplomat, minister, hellenist
- Employers: University of North Carolina at Chapel Hill (1886–1910); University of Tennessee (1873–1886)
- Awards: Legum Doctor (1893, University of North Carolina at Chapel Hill)

Eben Alexander (March 9, 1851 – March 11, 1910) was an American scholar, educator, dean, and diplomat.

== Life and career ==
Alexander was born in Knoxville, Tennessee, on March 9, 1851, to Judge Ebenezer Alexander and Margaret White McClung. Alexander attended the University of Tennessee (then known as East Tennessee University) for two years, then matriculated to Yale in 1869 where he graduated in 1873 with an A.B. He was initiated into Yale's Skull and Bones in 1873. After graduation, Alexander returned to Knoxville and taught Greek at the University of Tennessee, from 1873 to 1886, first as an instructor and then as Professor. In 1886, he moved to the University of North Carolina, in Chapel Hill, where from 1886 to 1893 he was Professor of Greek language and literature.

In 1893, President Grover Cleveland appointed him "Envoy Extraordinary, Minister Plenipotentiary, and Consul General to Greece, Roumania, and Servia" [sic]. As ambassador to Greece, he helped in the revival of the Olympic Games, making the first cash contribution to the organizing committee, encouraging the participation of American athletes, and with his wife hosting numerous social events during the period of the games, which ran from April 6 to April 15, 1896.

On his return from Greece, Alexander resumed teaching Greek at the University of North Carolina. He introduced modern Greek into the curriculum and served as academic dean from 1900 or 1901 until his death. Perhaps more importantly, he worked, both before and after his time in Greece, to improve the University's library, serving as supervisor of the University library in 1891–1893 and again from 1901 onwards. During his tenure as supervisor, a new Carnegie library was built, and the University hired its first real librarian, Louis Round Wilson. That Carnegie library built under Alexander's tenure, is now Hill Hall on the campus of the University of North Carolina.

He received the degree of Ph.D. from Maryville College in 1886, and that of LL.D. from the University of North Carolina in 1893, and was an instructor in the Summer school of the South in June and July, 1902.

In 1905 Alexander was inducted into the Order of the Golden Fleece, an honor society at the University of North Carolina that was modeled on Yale's Skull and Bones. During the academic year 1909–1910, Alexander's health began to fail. He took a leave of absence in the spring of 1910, returned to Knoxville, and there died on March 11, 1910. The University of North Carolina's 1911 annual yearbook, Yackety Yack, was dedicated in his memory.

== Family ==
Eben Alexander's father, Ebenezer Alexander, was a prominent judge in Tennessee, and his grandfather, Adam Rankin Alexander, was the founder of Alexandria, Tennessee and a member of the House of Representatives from 1823 to 1827.

Alexander married Marion Howard-Smith on October 15, 1874, and they had four children, two sons and two daughters.

=== Descendants of the same name ===
Eben Alexander was the father, grandfather, great-grandfather, and great-great-grandfather of four Eben Alexanders. He and his descendants use these generational suffixes:

- Eben Alexander (1851–1910), diplomat and scholar – progenitor
- Eben Alexander Sr., Knoxville, physician — son
- Eben Alexander II (or Jr.), Chief of Neurosurgery at Wake Forest Baptist Medical Center in Winston-Salem, North Carolina — grandson
- Eben Alexander III, born December 1953, academic neurosurgeon, author of Proof of Heaven — great-grandson
- Eben Alexander IV, born 1987, studied neuroscience in college — great-great-grandson

Diplomatic posts
Preceded by Truxtun Beale	United States Minister to Greece also accredited to Romania and Serbia; 1893–1897	Succeeded by William W. Rockhill
