= List of ambassadors of the United States to Greece =

Ambassador of the United States to Greece
- Πρέσβης των Ηνωμένων Πολιτειών της Αμερικής στην Ελλάδα
- Seal of the United States Department of State

- Flag of a United States ambassador

- Incumbent; Josh Huck; Chargé d'affaires since October 14, 2026
- Nominator: The president of the United States
- Appointer: The president; with Senate advice and consent
- Inaugural holder: Charles Keating Tuckerman as Minister
- Formation: 1868
- Website: U.S. Embassy - Athens

This is a list of United States ambassadors to Greece.

== List of ambassadors ==
List of ambassadors from the United States to Greece.

1868–1899

- Charles Keating Tuckerman (Minister 1868–71)
- John M. Francis (Minister 1871–73)
- John M. Read, Jr. (Minister 1873–77)
- John M. Read, Jr. (Chargé d'Affaires 1877–79)
- Eugene Schuyler (Minister 1882–84)
- Walker Fearn (Minister 1885–89)
- A. Loudon Snowden (Minister 1889–92)
- Truxtun Beale (Minister 1892–93)
- Eben Alexander (Minister 1893–97)
- William W. Rockhill (Minister 1897–99)

1899–1942

- Arthur Sherburne Hardy (Minister 1899–1901)
- Charles Spencer Francis (Minister 1901–02)
- John Brinkerhoff Jackson (Minister 1902–07)
- Richmond Pearson (Minister 1907–09)
- George H. Moses (Minister 1909–12)
- Jacob Gould Schurman (Minister 1912–13)
- George F. Williams (Minister 1913–14)
- Garrett Droppers (Minister 1914–20)
- Edward Capps (Minister 1920)
- Irwin Laughlin (Minister 1924–26)
- Robert Peet Skinner (Minister 1926–32)
- Lincoln MacVeagh (Minister 1933–41)
- A. J. Drexel Biddle, Jr. (Minister 1941–42)

1942–1997

- A. J. Drexel Biddle, Jr. (Ambassador 1942–43)
- Alexander C. Kirk (Ambassador 1943)
- Lincoln MacVeagh (Ambassador 1943–47)
- Henry F. Grady (Ambassador 1948–50)
- John Emil Peurifoy (Ambassador 1950–53)
- Cavendish W. Cannon (Ambassador 1953–56)
- George V. Allen (Ambassador 1956–57)
- James Williams Riddleberger (Ambassador 1958–59)
- Ellis O. Briggs (Ambassador 1959–62)
- Henry Richardson Labouisse, Jr. (Ambassador 1962–65)
- Phillips Talbot (Ambassador 1965–69)
- Henry J. Tasca (Ambassador 1969–74)
- Jack Bloom Kubisch (Ambassador 1974–77)
- Robert J. McCloskey (Ambassador 1978–81)
- Monteagle Stearns (Ambassador 1981–85)
- Robert Vossler Keeley (Ambassador 1985–89)
- Michael G. Sotirhos (Ambassador 1989–93)
- Thomas M. T. Niles (Ambassador 1993–97)

1997–2025

- R. Nicholas Burns (Ambassador 1997–2001)
- Thomas J. Miller (Ambassador 2001–04)
- Charles P. Ries (Ambassador 2004–07)
- Daniel V. Speckhard (Ambassador 2007–10)
- Daniel Bennett Smith (Ambassador 2010–13)
- David D. Pearce (Ambassador 2013–16)
- Geoffrey R. Pyatt (Ambassador 2016–22)
- George J. Tsunis (Ambassador 2022–25)
- Kimberly Guilfoyle (Ambassador 2025–26)

== Notes ==
The U.S. Embassy in Athens was closed July 14, 1941, after the German occupation of Greece. The United States maintained diplomatic relations with the government-in-exile of Greece in London (1941–43) and then in Cairo (1943–44). Ambassador MacVeagh reopened the embassy on October 27, 1944.

The U.S. Legation was raised to Embassy status on September 29, 1942. This action also promoted Minister Biddle to the rank of Ambassador, which required a new appointment. The appointment was promptly made by President Roosevelt and confirmed by the Senate. Ambassador Biddle presented his credentials to the government of Greece on October 30, 1942.

== See also ==
- List of ambassadors of Greece to the United States
- Embassy of the United States, Athens
- Greece – United States relations
- Foreign relations of Greece
- Ambassadors of the United States
