= John M. Francis =

American diplomat

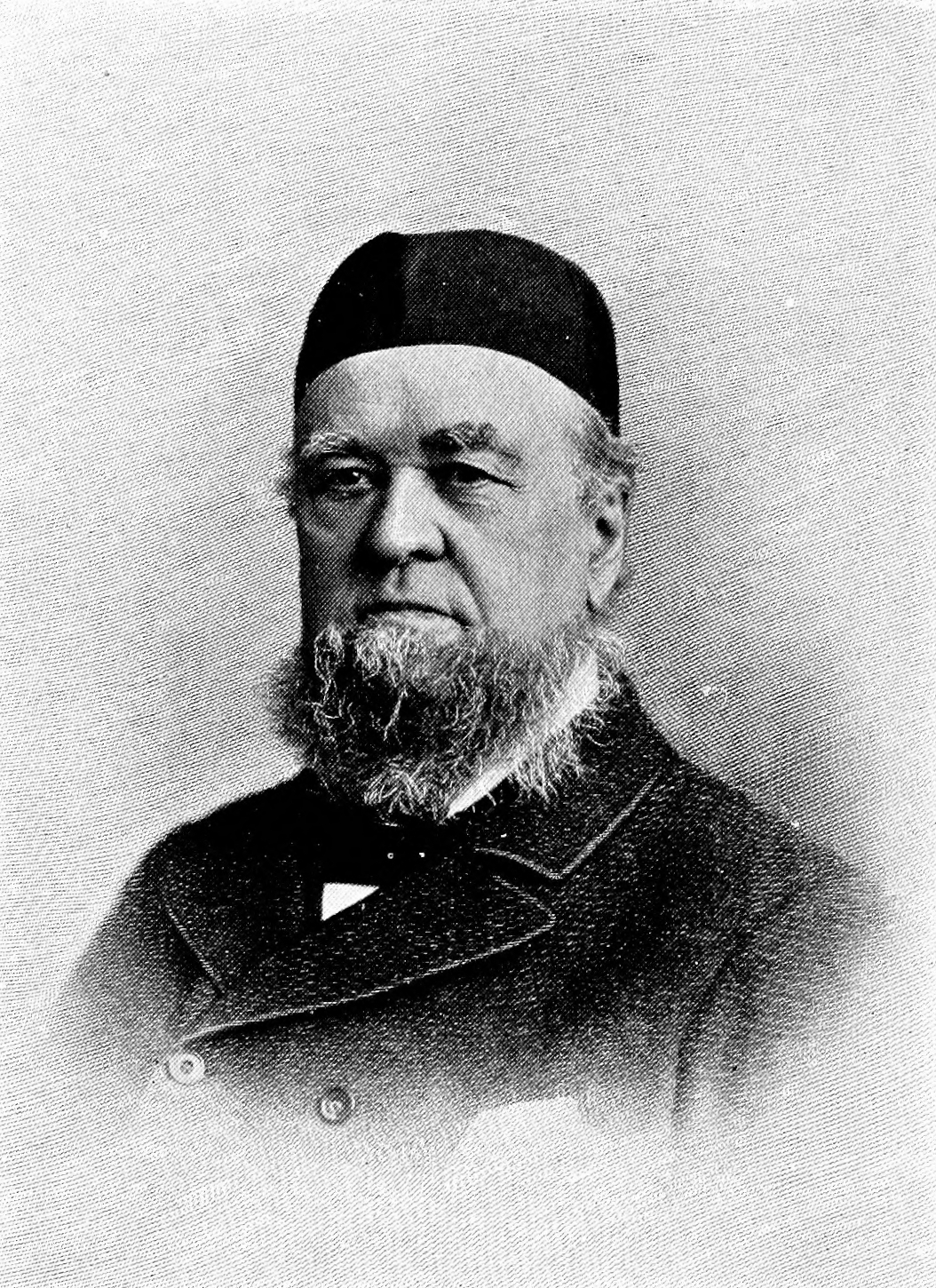

13th United States Minister to Austria-Hungary
- In office September 11, 1884 – August 3, 1885
- President: Chester A. Arthur; Grover Cleveland
- Preceded by: Alphonso Taft
- Succeeded by: Alexander Lawton

United States Minister to Portugal
- In office October 5, 1882 – August 25, 1884
- President: Chester A. Arthur
- Preceded by: Benjamin Moran
- Succeeded by: Lewis Richmond

2nd United States Minister to Greece
- In office November 11, 1871 – June 25, 1873
- President: Ulysses S. Grant
- Preceded by: Charles K. Tuckerman
- Succeeded by: J. Meredith Read

Personal details
- Born: March 6, 1823 Prattsburgh, New York, U.S.
- Died: June 18, 1897 (aged 74) Troy, New York, U.S.
- Spouse: Harriet E. Tucker
- Children: Charles Spencer Francis

John Morgan Francis (March 6, 1823 – June 18, 1897) was an American journalist and diplomat.

Francis was born in Prattsburgh, New York.his father was Richard Francis who was originally from Pembrokeshire, Wales. He left home in 1838 and began working in Canandaigua, New York, for several newspapers. He moved to Troy, New York in 1846 and was chief editor of the Northern Budget. Francis founded the Troy Daily Times on June 25, 1841. As a diplomat, Francis served as United States Minister to Greece (1871-1873), as Minister Resident/Consul General to Portugal (1882-1884) (originally appointed Chargé d'Affaires, he took the oath of office, but did not proceed to the post in that capacity), and as Envoy Extraordinary and Minister Plenipotentiary to Austria-Hungary (1884-1885). He was a delegate to the 1894 New York State Constitutional Convention. He died in Troy, New York.
