= Richard C. Kerens =

American contractor and politician (1842-1916)

22nd United States Ambassador to Austria-Hungary
- In office April 12, 1910 – June 28, 1913
- Preceded by: Charles Spencer Francis
- Succeeded by: Frederic Courtland Penfield

Personal details
- Born: 1842 Killberry, County Meath, Ireland
- Died: September 4, 1916

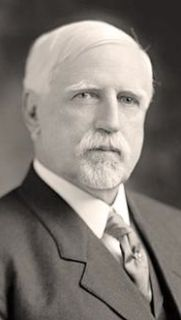
Kerens

Richard C. Kerens (1842 – September 4, 1916) was an American contractor and politician.

Kerens was born in Killberry, County Meath, Ireland, and was brought to the U. S. in infancy. He was educated in the public schools of Jackson Co., Iowa. Throughout the Civil War he served in the Union army. After the war he lived in Arkansas and at San Diego, Cal., and was contractor for the Overland Mail. In 1876 he moved to St. Louis, Mo., and thereafter was interested in the construction of railroads and was active in the Republican politics of Missouri. In 1892 he became a member of the Republican National Committee. From 1909 to 1913 he was ambassador to Austria-Hungary. In 1904, he was awarded the Laetare Medal by the University of Notre Dame, the oldest and most prestigious award for American Catholics.

His summer home at Elkins, West Virginia, known as "Pinecrest", was listed on the National Register of Historic Places in 1979.

== In popular culture ==
Bruce Boa portrayed Kerens in The Young Indiana Jones Chronicles episode "Vienna, November 1908".

Diplomatic posts
Preceded by Charles Spencer Francis	U.S. Ambassador to Austria-Hungary; 1909 - 1913	Succeeded by Frederic Courtland Penfield
