= John Read (lawyer) =

American lawyer and politician

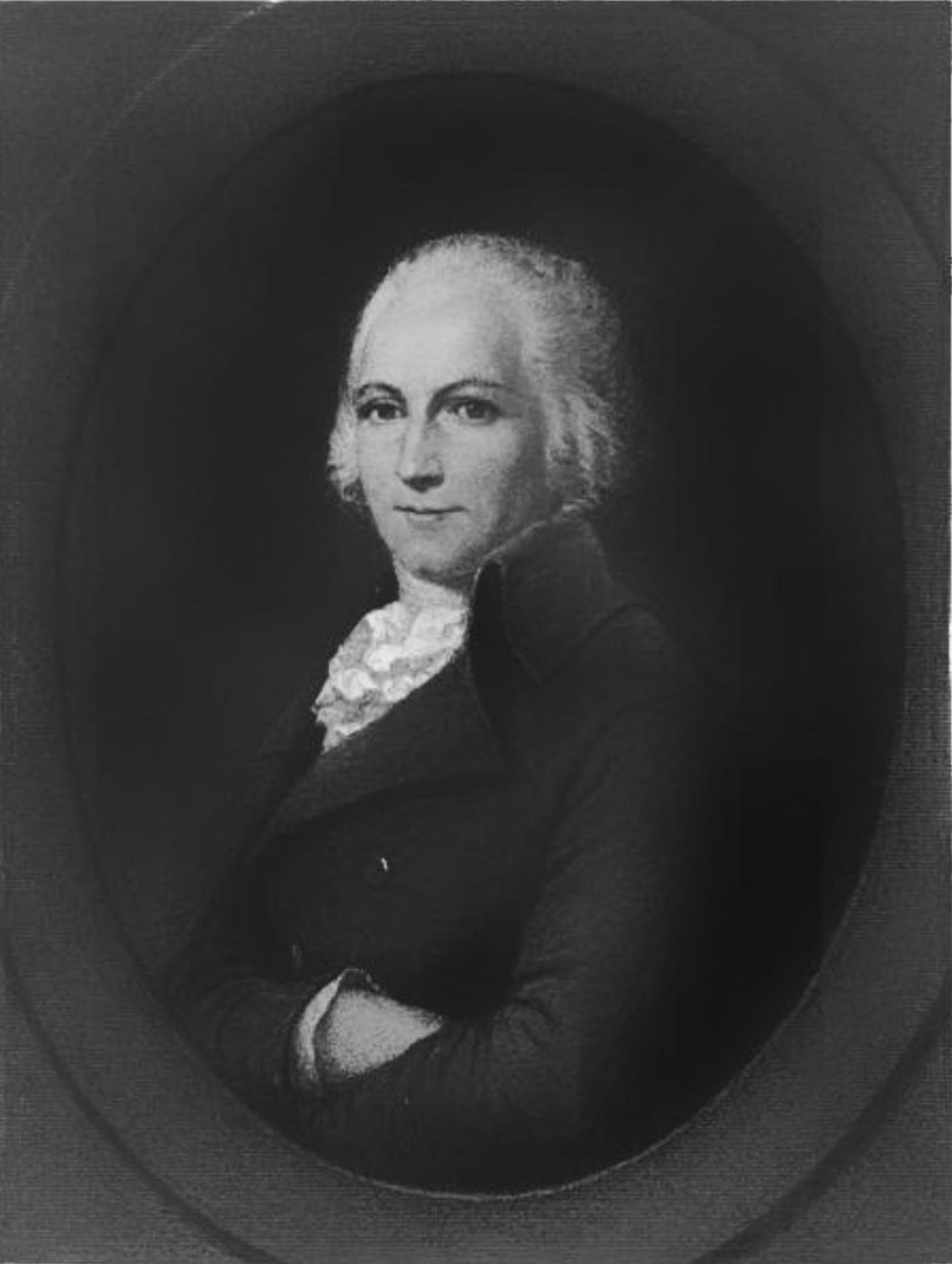
- Born: July 7, 1769
- Died: July 13, 1854 (aged 85)
- Education: Princeton University
- Occupation: Banker, politician, lawyer
- Spouse(s): Martha Meredith Read
- Children: John M. Read
- Parent(s): George Read
- Position held: member of the Pennsylvania House of Representatives, member of the Pennsylvania State Senate

John Read (July 7, 1769, Newcastle, Delaware - July 13, 1854, Trenton, New Jersey) was a lawyer and banker in the early history of the United States.

== Biography ==
Coat of Arms of John Read

John Read was a son of U.S. statesman George Read, brother of George Read Jr., and uncle of George Read III. He graduated from Princeton in 1787, and then studied law with his father. In 1789, he moved to Philadelphia, where he was admitted to the bar in 1792. In 1796, he married Martha Meredith. They had five children. Their son John M. Read was a noted Philadelphia jurist.

In 1797, John Read was appointed by President John Adams as agent general of the United States under the sixth article of Jay's Treaty, and held that office until its expiration in 1809. From 1809 to 1815, Read was a member of the city council of Philadelphia; he then served in the Pennsylvania legislature, and in 1816 chairman of its celebrated committee of seventeen.

Read succeeded Nicholas Biddle in the Pennsylvania Senate in 1816, was state director of the Philadelphia Bank in 1817, and succeeding his wife's uncle, George Clymer, as president of that bank in 1819, he filled that post until 1841, when he resigned. He was prominent in the councils of the Episcopal Church.

During the yellow-fever plague in Philadelphia in 1793, Read and Stephen Girard remained in the city, and he opened his purse and exposed his life in behalf of his suffering fellow citizens. Read was the author of Arguments on the British Debts (Philadelphia, 1798).
