= Ernst Leumann =

Swiss Indologist

- Born: 11 April 1859; Berg, Switzerland
- Died: 24 April 1931 (aged 72); Freiburg, Germany
- Occupation(s): Linguist, Jainologist

Ernst Leumann (11 April 1859 – 24 April 1931) was a Swiss Indologist and a pioneer of the research into Jainism and the languages of Turkestan whose work is in consideration even today.

== Early life ==
Ernst Leumann was born in Berg, a village in the Canton of Thurgau, on the 11th of April 1859. While in school, he developed an interest in linguistics through his Latin teacher Friedrich Haag, who later went on to become a professor at the University of Berne.

During the course of his studies, he relocated – after two terms in Geneva and Zürich (1877-78) – in autumn 1878 to Leipzig.

== Career ==
His studies on linguistics in Zürich and Geneva and of Sanskrit in Leipzig and Berlin were followed by his doctorate in 1881 in Strasbourg. His dissertation was Etymologisches Wörterbuch der Sanskritsprache (in German) (Etymological Dictionary of the Sanskrit Language).

1882–84 working on Sanskrit-English Dictionary in Oxford. (Note: Monier-Williams: Sanskrit-English Dictionary. Clarendon Press, Oxford 1899)
1884 Professor in Frauenfeld (Schweiz).
1884 Professor of Sanskrit at University Strasbourg. In 1909–10 he was dean.
1919 became honorary professor in Freiburg. (Note: Ernst Leumann had to leave Strasbourg after World War I when Strasbourg became French territory again)

== Publications ==
=== Author ===
- Beziehungen der Jaina-Literatur zu anderen Literaturkreisen Indiens (Relations of Jain literature to other literature of India) (in German)
- Übersicht über die Āvaśyaka-Literatur Glossar (Overview on Āvaśyaka literature, glossary) (in German)
- Das Aupapâtika Sûtra, erstes Upânga der Jaina : 1. Teil – Einleitung, Text und Glossar (in German) (Aupapâtika Sûtra, the first jain Upânga : part 1, introduction, text and glossary)
- Die Nonne. Ein neuer Roman aus dem alten Indien (in German) (The Nun, A new Tale from Old India)

=== Editor ===
Series Indica.

=== Posthumous publications ===
- Ernst Leumann (1934). Übersicht über die Avasyaka-Literatur. Aus dem Nachlaß herausgegeben von Walther Schubring [Overview about the Avasyaka Literature. Published by the estate of Walther Schubring.] (in German). Hamburg.
- Ernst Leumann (1998). Nalini Balbir (ed.). Kleine Schriften [Small Writings] (in German). Stuttgart: Franz Steiner Verlag. ISBN 9-783-4470-4882-8.

== Literature ==
- Catalogue of the Papers of Ernst Leumann in the Institute for the Culture and History of India and Tibet at the University Hamburg (in German)

== See also ==
- Sanskrit verbs
