= Yang Wenhui =

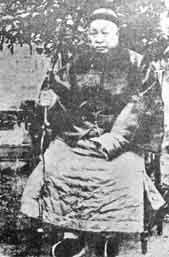
Yang Wenhui

Yang Wenhui (traditional Chinese: 楊文會; simplified Chinese: 杨文会; pinyin: Yáng Wénhùi; Wade–Giles: Yang Wenhui; 1837-1911) was a Chinese lay Buddhist reformer who has been called "The Father of the Modern Buddhist Renaissance". His courtesy name was Rénshān (仁山) and he is also thus known as Yáng Rénshān. He was a native of Shídài (石埭) county (modern Shítái 石台 county) in Anhui province.

While he was young he accompanied his father to live in Beijing, but the Taiping Rebellion forced them to flee to the lower Yangtze delta. Although he studied the Confucian classics as a child, in 1862 he became interested in Buddhism after reading a copy of the Awakening of Faith in the Mahayana (大乘起信論 dàchéng qǐxìn lùn). In 1866 he moved to Nanjing to manage architectural engineering projects for the government, where his Buddhist beliefs were strengthened through contact with other lay Buddhists.

It was not long after that he and several friends raised money to establish the Jinling Sutra Publishing House (金凌刻經處 Jīnlíng kèjīng chù), Jinling being an old name for Nanjing. In 1878 he left China to visit England and France, bringing back several scientific instruments which he donated to researchers in China. During another trip to England he met the Japanese Buddhist Nanjo Bunyu (南条文雄) and started a correspondence with him. With Nanjō's help, Yang was able to import over 300 sutra texts from Japan that had been lost within China. In 1894 he worked with the British missionary Timothy Richard (李提摩太) to translate Awakening of Faith in the Mahayana into English.

Yang established the Jetavana Hermitage (祗洹精舍 zhīhuan jīngshè) in 1908 for teaching Buddhism on the site of his publishing house and wrote the textbooks himself. He invited the poet-monk Su Manshu to teach Sanskrit and English. Over twenty monks studied there, preparing to spread the Dharma. Unfortunately, due to financial trouble the school closed after only two years.

In 1910 he founded the Buddhist Research Society (佛學研究會 fóxúe yánjiù hùi) and served as its head. The lay Buddhist Ouyang Jian (歐陽漸) studied under Yang at this time, and after Yang's death in 1911 Ouyang would reestablish Yang's old publishing house and school as the Chinese Inner Studies College (支那內學院 zhīnà nèi xúeyuàn). Yang Wenhui had many students over his lifetime, including several well-known figures such as Zhang Taiyan, Tan Sitong, and Taixu.
