= Nanjō Bun'yū =

Japanese Buddhist priest and scholar

- 南条文雄
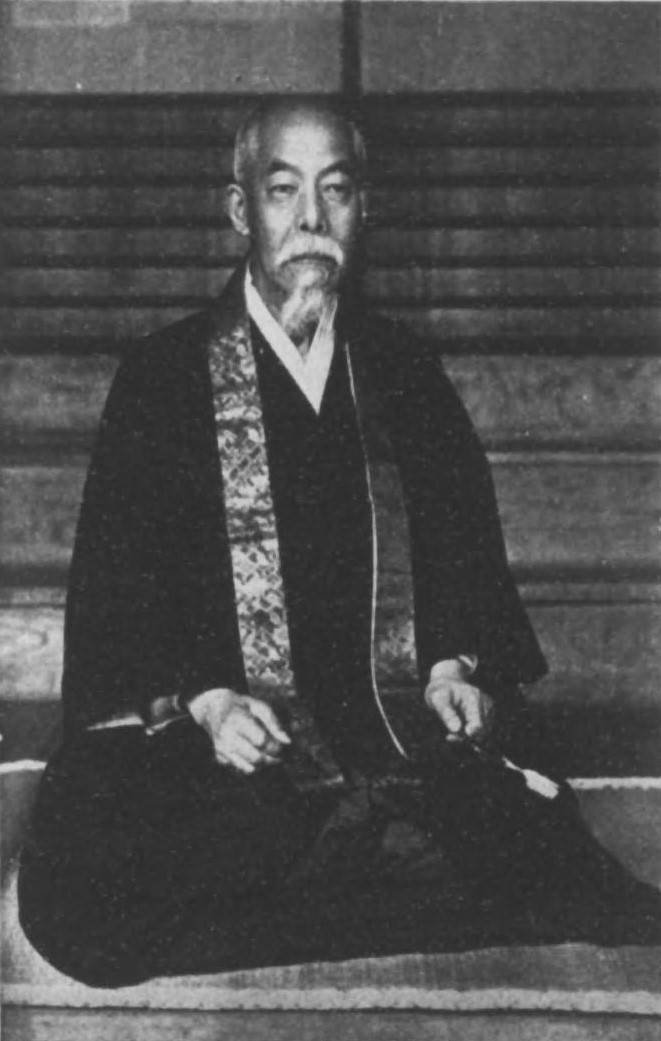
- Born: July 1, 1849; Aichi Japan
- Died: November 9, 1927 (aged 78)
- Occupation: Buddhist scholar

Nanjō Bun'yū (Note: The usual spelling of his name in English publications was Nanjio Bunyiu, but this is not the current standard. It is however the form used in library records of his works.) (南条文雄) (1 July 1849 – 9 November 1927) was a Buddhist priest and one of the most important modern Japanese scholars of Buddhism. Nanjō was born to the abbot of Seiunji Temple (誓運寺), part of the Shinshu Ōtani sect (真宗大谷派) of the Higashi Hongan-ji (東本願寺) branch of Jōdo Shinshū.

== Biography ==
Nanjō studied Classical Chinese texts and Buddhist doctrine in his youth before being sent to Europe in 1876 to study Sanskrit and Indian philosophy from European scholars, including Max Müller, under whom Bunyu studied in England. While there he met the Chinese Buddhist Yang Wenhui, whom he helped to acquire some three hundred Chinese Buddhist texts that had been lost in China to be reprinted at Yang's printing house in Nanjing.

In September 1880, Nanjō examined and cataloged a complete edition of the Chinese translation of the Buddhist Tripitaka that had been gifted to the India Office Library in London by the Japanese government. He determined that the India Office Library collection contained the same works as those mentioned in the oldest catalogue of the Chinese Translation of the Buddhist Tripitaka compiled in 520 AD.

Nanjō endeavored to make the Buddhist canon more accessible to practitioners. He did this in part by collaborating with Maeda Eun to compile the **Bukkyō Seiten** (仏教聖典), also known as the 'Buddhist Bible,' published in 1906 by Sanseidō.

He returned to Japan in 1884 and served as a professor or head of a number of Buddhist seminaries and universities until his death.

== Major publications ==
- (Co-editor with F. Max Müller) Buddhist Texts from Japan. Oxford: Clarendon Press, 1881–84.
- Nanjo Bunyu (1883). A Catalogue of the Chinese Translation of the Buddhist Tripitaka, the Sacred Canon of the Buddhists in China and Japan, Compiled by Order of the Secretary of State for India. Oxford, Clarendon Press.
- A Short History of the Twelve Japanese Buddhist Sects. Translated from the Original Japanese by Bunyiu Nanjio. Tokyo, Bukkyo-Sho-ei-yaku-Shuppan-sha, 1886.
- (Co-author) An Unabridged Japanese-English Dictionary, with Copious Illustrations, by Capt. F. Brinkley. Tokyo, Sanseido [1896].
- B. Nanjio (ed.). The Laṅkāvatāra Sūtra, Kyoto, Otani University Press 1923 [In Nāgarī].
- H. Kern; B. Nanjio (ed.); Saddharmapuṇḍarīka; St. Pétersbourg 1908-1912 (Imprimerie de l'Académie Impériale des Sciences), XII, 507 S.; Sert.: Bibliotheca Buddhica, 10 [In Nāgarī] Vol.1, Vol. 2, Vol 3, Vol. 4, Vol. 5.
- Maeda Eun and Nanjo Bunyu. Bukkyō Seiten 仏教聖典. Tokyo: Sanseidō. 1906.
