= Tuckerman (surname) =

Tuckerman is a surname. Notable people with the surname include:

- Bayard Tuckerman (1855–1923), American biographer and historian
- Bayard Tuckerman Jr. (1889–1974), American jockey, businessman, and politician
- Bryant Tuckerman (1915–2002), American mathematician
- Charles K. Tuckerman (1827–1896), American diplomat and writer
- Edward Tuckerman (1817–1886), American botanist
- Frederick Goddard Tuckerman (1821–1873), American poet
- Herbert Tuckerman (1921–2007), American politician
- Henry Theodore Tuckerman (1813–1871), American writer, essayist and critic
- Jane Tuckerman (born 1947), American photographer
- Joseph Tuckerman (1778–1840), American clergyman and philanthropist
- Laurette Tuckerman (born 1956), French and American mathematical physicist
- Nancy Tuckerman (1928–2018), American White House Social Secretary
- Samuel Parkman Tuckerman (1819–1890), American composer
- Stephen Salisbury Tuckerman (1830–1904), American painter

== See also ==
- Edward Tuckerman Potter (1831–1904), American architect
