= List of English translations of the Divine Comedy =

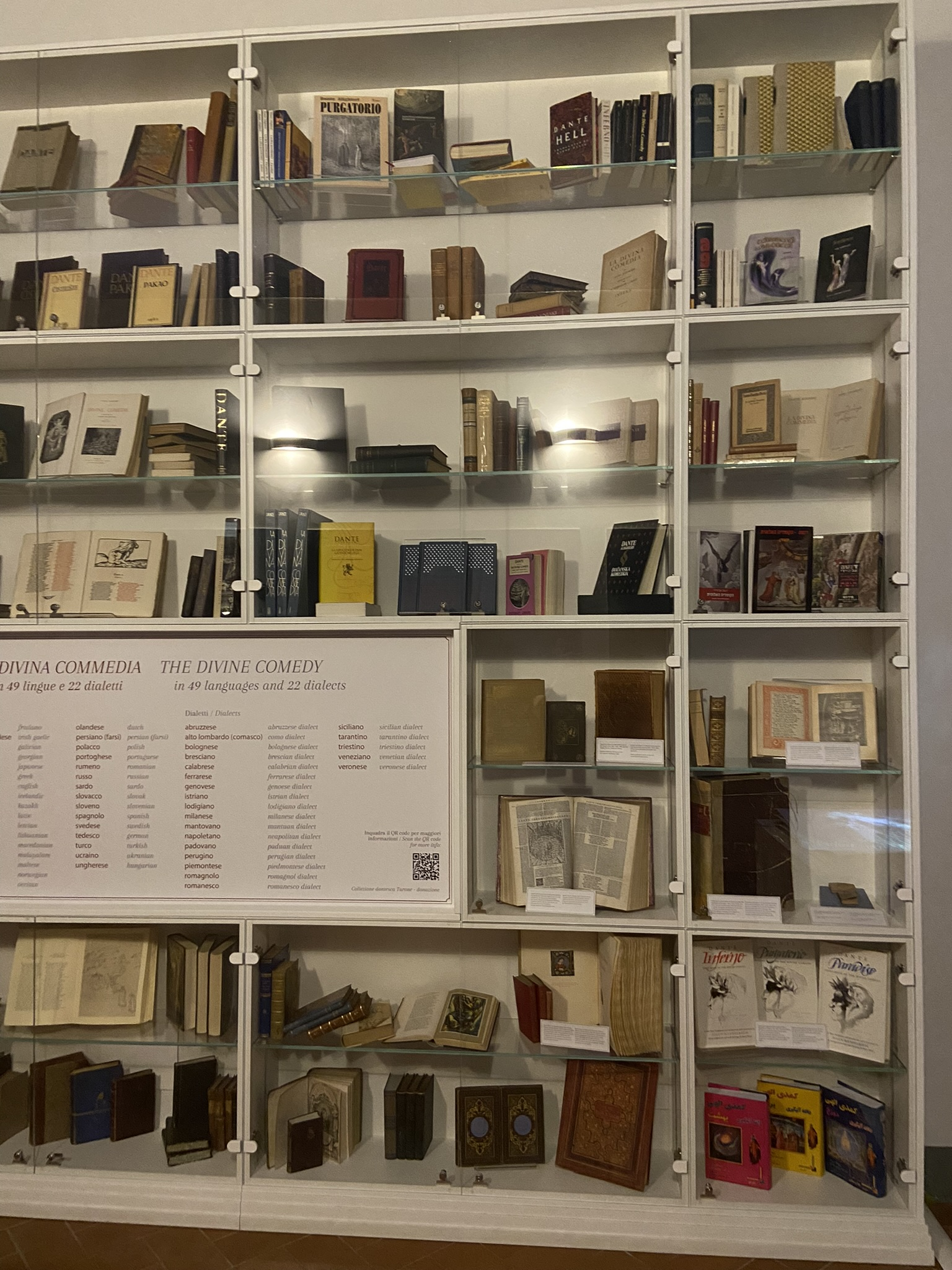
A room in Dante's House Museum containing many translations of the Divine Comedy into different languages

The Divine Comedy by Dante Alighieri is an epic poem in Italian written between 1308 and 1321 that describes its author's journey through the Christian afterlife. The three cantiche (Note: Latin-derived term for the three parts of the Divine Comedy. The singular form is cantica.) of the poem, Inferno, Purgatorio, and Paradiso, describe Hell, Purgatory, and Heaven, respectively. The poem is considered one of the greatest works of world literature and helped establish Dante's Tuscan vernacular as the standard form of the Italian language. It has been translated over 400 times into at least 52 different languages.

Though English poets Geoffrey Chaucer and John Milton referenced and partially translated Dante's works in the 14th and 17th centuries, respectively, it took until the early 19th century for the first full English translation of the Divine Comedy to be published. This was over 300 years after the first Latin (1416), Spanish (1515), and French (1500s) translations had been completed. By 1906, Dante scholar Paget Toynbee calculated that the Divine Comedy had been touched upon by over 250 translators and sixty years later bibliographer Gilbert F. Cunningham observed that the frequency of English Dante translations was increasing with time. As of 2023, the Divine Comedy has been translated into English more times than it has been translated into any other language.

== List of translations ==
A complete listing and criticism of all English translations of at least one of the three cantiche (parts) was made by Cunningham in 1966. The table below summarises Cunningham's data with additions between 1966 and the present, many of which are taken from the Dante Society of America's yearly North American bibliography and Società Dantesca Italiana's international bibliography. Many more translations of individual lines or cantos (Note: Each cantica is divided into thirty-three or thirty-four cantos so that the Comedy has a total of one hundred) exist, but these are too numerous for the scope of this list.

List of translations
Published	Translator(s)	Nationality	Publisher(s)	Parts translated	Form (Note: The Divine Comedy was originally written in hendecasyllabic terza rima, i.e. eleven-syllable lines and a rhyme scheme of ABA BCB CDC ...YZY Z. Most English translations that attempt to replicate the rhyme scheme replace the hendecasyllables with iambic pentameter, a ten-syllable form more common in English-language poetry. Many translations use a simplified rhyme scheme of ABA CDC EFE, described by Cunningham and listed here as "defective terza rima".)	Notes
1782	Charles Rogers	United Kingdom	J. Nichols	Inferno	Blank verse	First translation of a full cantica into English. Initially published anonymously
1785–1802	Henry Boyd	United Kingdom	C. Dilly	Comedy	Rhymed 6-line stanzas	First full translation of the Divine Comedy in English
1805–1814	Henry Francis Cary	United Kingdom	James Carpenter (The Inferno, 1805–1806); Taylor and Hessey (The Vision, 1814)	Comedy	Blank verse	Volume 20 in the Harvard Classics series. Reprinted by Bohn's Library in 1850 and Chandos Classics in 1871 Described by The Cambridge Companion to Dante as the first "powerful, accurate, and poetically moving" translation. Became a bestseller and was required in schools
1807	Nathaniel Howard	United Kingdom	John Murray	Inferno	Blank verse	
1812	Joseph Hume	United Kingdom	T. Cadell and W. Davies	Inferno	Blank verse	
1833–1840	Ichabod Charles Wright	United Kingdom	Longman, Rees, Orme, Brown, Green, & Longman	Comedy	Rhymed 6-line stanzas	
1843–1865	John Dayman	United Kingdom	Longmans, Green, and Co.	Comedy	Terza rima	
1843–1893	Thomas William Parsons	United States	De Vries, Ibarra and Company; Houghton, Mifflin and Company	Comedy (incomplete)	Quatrains and irregular rhyme	
1849	John Aitken Carlyle	United Kingdom	Chapman and Hall	Inferno (Note: Featured in Illustrated Modern Library's 1994 Divine Comedy; illustrated by George Grosz)	Prose	First British prose translation of Inferno. Reprinted by J.M. Dent and Sons and edited by Hermann Oelsner for their Temple Classics line in 1900
1850	Patrick Bannerman	United Kingdom	William Blackwood and Sons	Comedy	Irregular rhyme	
1851–1854	Charles Bagot Cayley	United Kingdom	Longmans, Brown, Green, and Longmans	Comedy	Terza rima	
1854	Thomas Brooksbank	United Kingdom	John W. Parker and Son	Inferno	Terza rima	
1854	Sir William Frederick Pollock	United Kingdom	Chapman and Hall	Comedy	Blank tercets	
1859	Bruce Whyte	United Kingdom	Wright & Co.; Simpkin, Marshall, & Co	Inferno	Irregular rhyme	
1859–1866	John Wesley Thomas	United Kingdom	Henry G. Bohn	Comedy	Terza rima	
1862	William Patrick Wilkie	United Kingdom	Edmonston and Douglas	Inferno	Blank tercets	
1862–1863	Claudia Hamilton Ramsay (Note: Born Claudia Hamilton Garden. Used pen name "Mrs. Ramsay")	United Kingdom	Tinsley Brothers	Comedy	Terza rima	
1865	William Michael Rossetti	United Kingdom	Macmillan and Co.	Inferno	Blank tercets	
1865–1870	James Ford	United Kingdom	Smith, Elder & Co.	Comedy	Terza rima	
1867	Henry Wadsworth Longfellow	United States	Ticknor and Fields and Bernhard Tauchnitz	Comedy	Blank tercets	First complete translation by an American author. Highly praised upon publication and remains one of the most commonly reprinted translations in both the United States and the United Kingdom
1867–1868	David Johnston	United Kingdom	Self-published	Comedy	Blank tercets	Never placed on sale; the author sent copies directly to libraries and friends
1877	Charles Tomlinson	United Kingdom	S.W. Partridge and Co.	Inferno	Terza rima	
1881	Warburton Pike	United Kingdom	C. Kegan Paul & Co.	Inferno	Terza rima	
1883	William Stratford Dugdale	United Kingdom	George Bell & Sons	Purgatorio	Prose	
1884	James Romanes Sibbald	United Kingdom	David Douglas	Inferno	Terza rima	
1885	James Innes Minchin	United Kingdom	Longmans, Green, and Co.	Comedy	Terza rima	
1886–1887	Edward Hayes Plumptre	United Kingdom	Wm. Isbister Limited	Comedy	Terza rima	
1887	Frederick Kneller Haselfoot Haselfoot	United Kingdom	Kegan Paul, Trench & Co.	Comedy	Terza rima	
1888	John Augustine Wilstach	United States	Houghton, Mifflin and Company	Comedy	Rhymed stanzas	
1892–1915	Charles Lancelot Shadwell	United Kingdom	Macmillan & Co.	Purgatorio and Paradiso	Marvellian stanzas	
1893	George Musgrave	United Kingdom	Swan Sonnenschein & Co.	Inferno	Spenserian stanzas	
1893	Edward Sullivan (Note: Son of Sir Edward Sullivan, 1st Baronet)	United Kingdom	Elliot Stock	Inferno	Prose	
1895	Robert Urquhart	United Kingdom	Privately printed	Inferno	Terza rima	Bibliographer Gilbert F. Cunningham inferred that "Macmillan [& Co.] arranged for the production of the book, but decided not to publish it"
1898	Eugene Jacob Lee-Hamilton	United Kingdom	Grant Richards	Inferno	Hendecasyllabic blank tercets	
1899	Philip Henry Wicksteed	United Kingdom	J.M. Dent & Sons	Paradiso	Prose	Edited by Herman Oelsner for Temple Classics
1899	Arthur Compton Auchmuty	United Kingdom	Williams and Norgate	Purgatorio	Octosyllabic terza rima	
1899–1901	Samuel Home	United Kingdom	Woodall, Minshall, and Co.	Purgatorio (incomplete: I–XXXI only)	Hendecasyllabic blank tercets	
1901	Thomas Okey	United Kingdom	J.M. Dent & Sons	Purgatorio	Prose	Edited by Herman Oelsner for Temple Classics
1901	John Carpenter Garnier	United Kingdom	Truslove, Hanson & Combe	Inferno	Prose	
1902	Edward Clarke Lowe	United Kingdom	G. H. Tyndall	Comedy	Blank tercets	
1903–1909	Edward Wilberforce	United Kingdom	Macmillan and Co.	Comedy	Terza rima	
1903–1911	Sir Samuel Walker Griffith	United Kingdom	Powell and Co.	Comedy	Hendecasyllabic blank tercets	
1904	Caroline C. Potter	United Kingdom	Digby, Long & Co.	Purgatorio and Paradiso	Rhymed quatrains	
1904	Marvin Richardson Vincent	United States	Charles Scribner's Sons	Inferno	Blank verse	
1905	Charles Gordon Wright	United Kingdom	Methuen & Co.	Purgatorio	Prose	
1908	Frances Isabella Fraser	United Kingdom	S.W. Simms	Paradiso	Blank tercets	
1910	Agnes Louisa Money	United Kingdom	George Allen & Sons	Purgatorio	Blank tercets	
1911	Charles Edwin Wheeler	United Kingdom	J.M. Dent & Sons	Comedy	Terza rima	
1914	Edith Mary Shaw	United Kingdom	Constable and Company	Comedy	Blank verse	
1915	Edward Joshua Edwardes	United Kingdom	Women's Printing Society	Inferno	Blank tercets	
1915	Sir Samuel Griffith	Australia	Oxford University Press	Comedy	Unrhymed hendecasyllabic verse	First translation by an Australian author
1915	Henry Johnson	United States	Yale University Press; Humphrey Milford, Oxford University Press	Comedy	Blank tercets	
1918–1921	Courtney Langdon	United States	Harvard University Press	Comedy	Blank verse	
1920	Eleanor Vinton Murray	United States	Self-published	Inferno	Terza rima	
1921	Melville Best Anderson	United States	World Book Company; Yonkers-on-Hydon; George G. Harrap & Co.	Comedy	Terza rima	Reprinted in Oxford World's Classics with an introduction from Paget Toynbee in 1932
1922	Henry John Hooper	United Kingdom	George Routledge and Sons	Inferno	Amphibrachic tetrameter	
1927	David James MacKenzie	United Kingdom	Longmans, Green and Co.	Comedy	Terza rima	
1928–1931	Albert R. Bandini	United States (born in Italy)	The People's Publishing Co.	Comedy	Terza rima	
1928–1954	Sydney Fowler Wright	United Kingdom	Fowler Wright Ltd.; Oliver and Boyd	Inferno and Purgatorio	Irregularly rhymed decasyllables	
1931	Jefferson Butler Fletcher	United States	The Macmillan Company	Comedy	Defective terza rima	
1931	Lacy Lockert	United States	Princeton University Press	Inferno	Terza rima	
1932–1935	Geoffrey Langdale Bickersteth	United Kingdom	Cambridge University Press	Comedy	Terza rima	
1933–1943	Laurence Binyon	United Kingdom	Macmillan and Co.	Comedy	Terza rima	
1934–1940	Louis How	United States	The Harbor Press	Comedy	Terza rima	
1938	Ralph Thomas Bodey	United Kingdom	Harold Cleaver	Comedy	Blank verse	
1948	Lawrence Grant White	United States	Pantheon Books	Comedy	Blank verse	
1948	Patrick Cummins	United States	B. Herder Book Co.	Comedy	Hendecasyllabic terza rima	
1949–1962	Dorothy L. Sayers	United Kingdom	Penguin Books	Comedy	Terza rima	Printed in Penguin Classics. After Sayers' death in 1957, the final cantos of Paradiso were completed by Barbara Reynolds.
1952	Thomas Weston Ramsey	United Kingdom	The Hand and Flower Press	Paradiso	Defective terza rima	
1954–1970	John Ciardi	United States	New American Library	Comedy	Defective terza rima	Audio version of Inferno recorded and released by Folkways Records in 1954
1956	Glen Levin Swiggett	United States	University Press of the University of the South	Comedy	Terza rima	
1958	Mary Prentice Lillie	United States	Grabhorn Press	Comedy	Hendecasyllabic blank tercets	
1961	Warwick Fielding Chipman	United Kingdom	Oxford University Press	Inferno	Terza rima	
1965	William F. Ennis	United Kingdom	Il Campo Editore	Comedy	Dodecasyllabic terza rima	
1965	Aldo Maugeri	Italy	La Sicilia	Inferno	Blank tercets	First English translation of Inferno to be published in Italy.
1966	Louis Biancolli	United States	Washington Square Press	Comedy	Blank verse	
1966	G. W. Greene	United States	Italica	Inferno (incomplete)	Blank verse	Contains only thirty-one of the Inferno's thirty-four cantos; Greene died in 1883 without publishing the work
1966	BBC Third Programme	United Kingdom	British Broadcasting Corporation	Inferno	Terza rima; Defective terza rima; Unrhymed hexameter; Alliterative verse; Blank verse	Contains work from twelve translators who presented their translations on the BBC Third Programme
1967–2002	Mark Musa	United States	Penguin Books	Comedy	Blank verse	Second Penguin Classics translation
1969	Thomas Goddard Bergin	United States	Grossman Publishers	Comedy	Blank verse	
1969	Allan Gilbert	United States	Duke University Press	Inferno	Prose	
1979	Kenneth R. Mackenzie	United Kingdom	The Folio Society	Comedy	Verse	Contains engravings from John Flaxman
1980–1984	Allen Mandelbaum	United States	Bantam Books	Comedy	Blank verse	Mandelbaum was awarded a Gold Medal of Honor from the city of Florence for his translation. Certain editions contain illustrations from Barry Moser.
1981	C. H. Sisson	United Kingdom	Oxford World's Classics	Comedy	Free tercets	
1983	Tom Phillips	United Kingdom	Waddington Graphics	Inferno	Verse	Contains original prints by Phillips
1985	Nicholas Kilmer	United States	Branden Publishing Co.	Inferno	Blank verse	
1987	James Finn Cotter	United States	Amity House	Comedy	Blank verse	
1990	Tibor Wlassics	Hungary (published and written in the United States)	In Print Inc.	Inferno	Blank verse	
1993	James S. Torrens, S.J.	United States	University of Scranton Press; University of London Press: University of Toronto Press	Paradiso	Blank verse	
1994	Steve Ellis	United Kingdom	Chatto & Windus	Inferno	Blank verse	
1994	Stephen Wentworth Arndt	United States	The Edwin Mellen Press	Comedy	Terza rima	
1994	Robert Pinsky	United States	Farrar, Straus and Giroux	Inferno	Terza rima	
1996	Peter Dale	United Kingdom	Anvil Press Poetry	Comedy	Terza rima	
1997–1998	Kathryn Lindskoog	United States	Mercer University Press	Comedy	Prose	Advertised as a "retelling" rather than direct translation
1998	Elio Zappulla	United States	Random House	Inferno	Blank verse	
2000	Stanley Appelbaum	United States	Dover Publications	Comedy (partial)	Free verse	Contains a total of thirty-three cantos selected from different cantiche
2000	Armand Schwerner	United States	Talisman House	Inferno (incomplete)	Blank verse	Contains only twelve cantos; Schwerner died before he could finish the translation
2000	W. S. Merwin	United States	Knopf	Purgatorio	Blank verse	
2000–2007	Jean Hollander and Robert Hollander	United States	Anchor Books	Comedy	Free verse	Known for its extensive scholarly notes; the full text is over 600 pages. The Hollanders were given a Gold Florin award from the city of Florence for their translation.
2002	Ciaran Carson	Ireland (published in the United Kingdom)	Granta Books	Inferno	Terza rima	First Irish translation of Inferno.
2002–2008	Michael Palma	United States	W.W. Norton	Comedy	Terza rima	
2002–2004	Anthony M. Esolen	United States	Modern Library Classics	Comedy	Blank verse	
2005–2012	J. Gordon Nichols	United Kingdom	Alma Books	Comedy	Defective terza rima	
2006–2007	Robin Kirkpatrick	United Kingdom	Penguin Books	Comedy	Blank verse	Third Penguin Classics translation
2007	Frank Salvidio	United States	iUniverse (self-published)	Inferno	Free tercets	
2007–2017	Tom Simone	United States	Focus-Hackett Publishing	Comedy	Free verse	
2009–2017	Stanley Lombardo	United States	Hackett Classics	Comedy	Blank tercets	
2010	Burton Raffel	United States	Northwestern World Classics	Comedy	Terza rima	
2011	Robert M. Torrance	United States	Xlibris (self-published)	Inferno	Terza rima	
2013–2025	Mary Jo Bang	United States	Graywolf Press	Comedy	Free verse	Text of poem contains anachronistic references to figures such as Sigmund Freud, Vladimir Mayakovsky, and Stephen Colbert
2013	Clive James	Australia (written in the United Kingdom)	Picador	Comedy	Quatrains	
2017	Peter Thornton	United States	Arcade Publishing	Inferno	Blank verse	
2018–2020	Alasdair Gray	United Kingdom	Canongate Books	Comedy	Prosaic verse	Renders "Ghibelline" and "Guelph" as "Tory" and "Whig" respectively
2021–2025	David Macleod Black	United Kingdom (born in South Africa)	New York Review Books	Purgatorio and Paradiso	Blank verse	
2021	Ned Denny	United Kingdom	Carcanet	Comedy	Long, loosely-rhyming couplets in twelve-line, 144-syllable stanzas (an average of nine per canto).	A "poet's version... in the interpretative tradition of Chapman, Dryden and Pope" and titled simply B (After Dante) - with the canticas becoming Blaze, Bathe and Bliss - this is the only translation to recast the Commedia into a wholly original form.
2024-2025	Jason M. Baxter	United States	Angelico Press	Inferno, Purgatorio (Paradiso not yet published)	Free tercets with musical and rhythmic verses	
2025	Lorna Goodison	Jamaica	Carcanet Press	Inferno	Free tercets	

=== Full Prose Translations ===
List of translations
Published	Translator(s)	Nationality	Publisher(s)	Notes
1852	Reverend E. O'Donnell	United Kingdom	Thomas Richardson and Son	First British prose translation of the whole Divine Comedy
1880–1892	Arthur John Butler	United Kingdom	Macmillan and Co.	
1891–1892	Charles Eliot Norton	United States	Houghton, Mifflin and Company	First American prose translation of the whole Divine Comedy. Revised in 1902
1889–1900	William Warren Vernon	United Kingdom	Macmillan & Co.	
1904	Henry Fanshawe Tozer	United Kingdom	Clarendon Press	
1939–1946	John Dickson Sinclair	United Kingdom	The Bodley Head	Republished by Oxford University Press in 1948 with emendations. Heavily annotated literal translation that is considered the most accurate and most faithful to the original Italian
1949–1953	Harry Morgan Ayres	United States	S. F. Vanni	
1954	Howard Russell Huse	United States	Rinehart	
1962	Clara Stillman Reed	United States	Self-published	
1970–1975	Charles S. Singleton	United States	Princeton University Press	Literal prose translation. Published in 6 volumes with 1 volume of translation facing Italian text and 1 volume of commentary for each cantica
1996–2007	Robert M. Durling	United States	Oxford University Press	
2000	A. S. Kline	United States	Poetry in translation	
2021	Gerald J. Davis	United States	Insignia Publishing	

== See also ==
- Divine Comedy in popular culture
