= Ellen Robbins =

American botanical illustrator

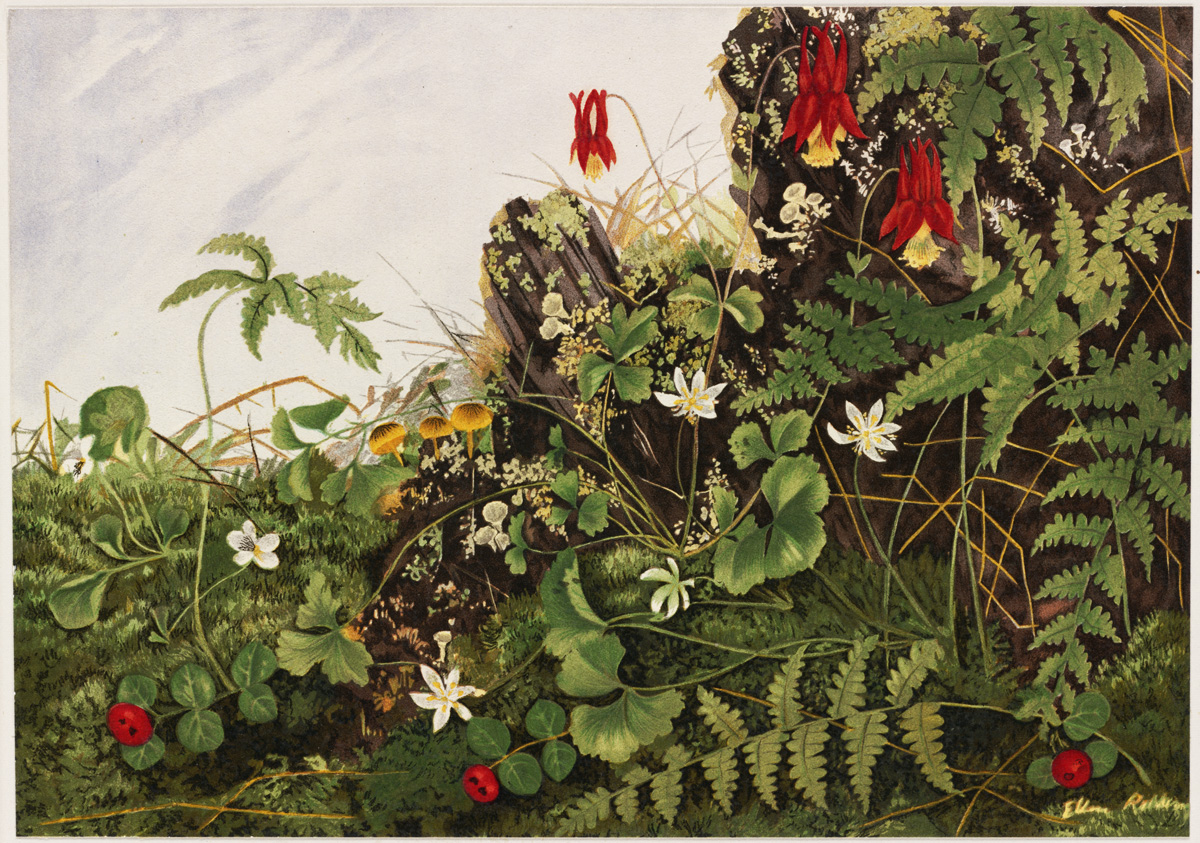
Wild Flowers No. 1, chromolithograph (Boston Public Library)

Ellen Robbins (1828 – 1905) was a 19th-century American botanical illustrator known for paintings of wildflowers and autumn leaves. She was one of the contributors to the first annual exhibition of the American Watercolor Society in 1867/1868.

== Early life ==
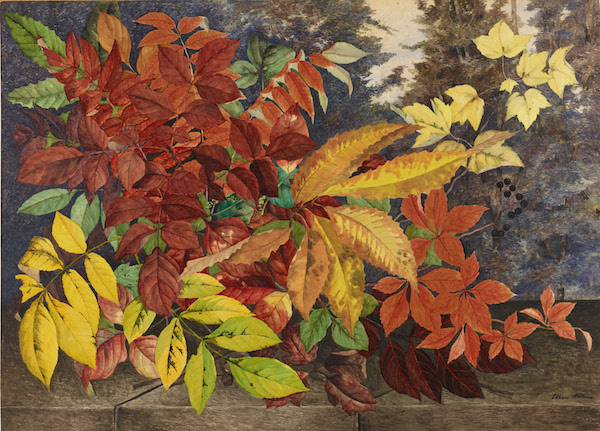
Autumn Leaves ca. 1870, Philadelphia Museum of Art

Born in 1828 in Watertown, Massachusetts, Ellen Robbins was the youngest child of a factory owner who died when she was still a child. His factory subsequently burned down, and the combination of events left the family in straitened circumstances. Robbins began trying to help the family's finances by getting work while still very young. After trying various domestic arts, she turned to watercolor painting. Although she received some training from an artist named Stephen Salisbury Tuckerman, she was largely self-taught.

== Career ==
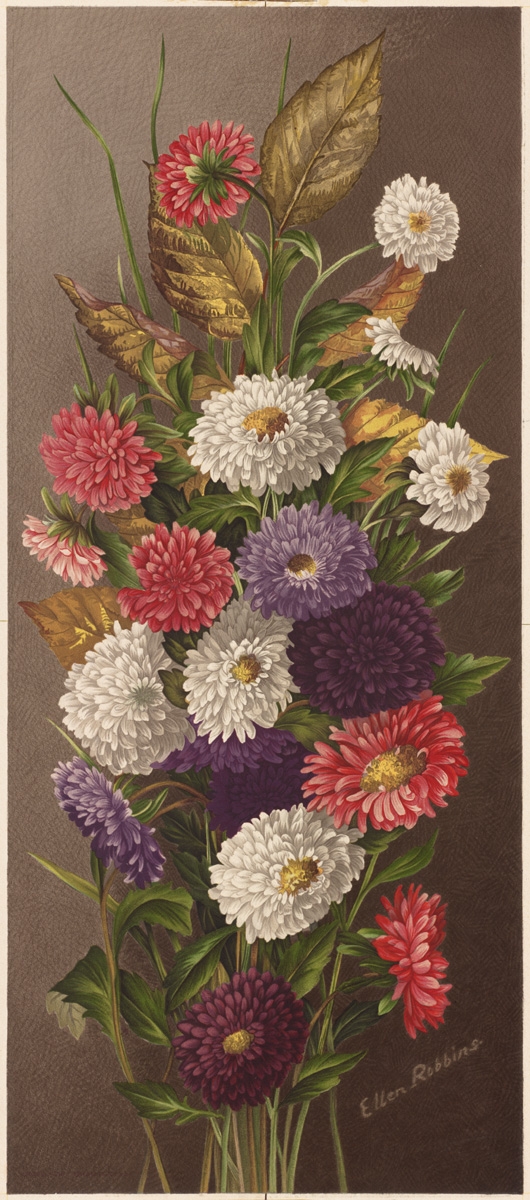
Asters, chromolithograph (Boston Public Library)

In her twenties, Robbins began producing books of flower illustrations and selling them for the then very substantial sum of $25 each. Her success with these led her to broaden out from flowers to autumn leaves. She was known for work so realistic that, as one contemporary wrote, bees might light on her flowers. Similarly, her leaf paintings are still occasionally mistaken for real leaves by viewers. The art historian Samuel Benjamin considered her "one of the finest still life painters in America." Another art historian, however, has compared the "harsh edges and forthright local color" of Robbins's flower paintings unfavorably to the work of Childe Hassam, yet those are precisely the qualities that her fans admire.

In addition to publishing books, Robbins sold original paintings through a shop in Boston. Her work became fashionable in both America and England, and she began painting botanical designs on china and even furniture for her clients. In the 1840s, she began creating textile designs, as well as designs for tiles and needlework. In the 1840s, she began also to teach watercolor painting.

In the late 1860s, after the introduction of chromolithography, the lithographer Louis Prang hired her to create a series of flowers and autumn leaves specifically to be sold as prints. Through contacts among prominent Bostonians like Henry Ward Beecher, she was invited to create a frieze (since destroyed) at Wellesley College outside Boston.

With increasing success, Robbins was able to travel abroad and to take time off in the summer, when she often spent time in Maine with the writer Celia Thaxter. She became one of the first of a series of prominent artists who stayed at Thaxter's Appledore House hotel, where she painted the flowers in its famous garden.

An inscription on one of her paintings suggests that she got married in 1858, but her husband's name is not recorded.

In 1896, she published a series of articles in New England Magazine reflecting on her life, entitled "Reminiscences of a Flower Painter."

== Publications ==
- Autumnal Leaves (1868, 18 watercolors)

== Gallery ==
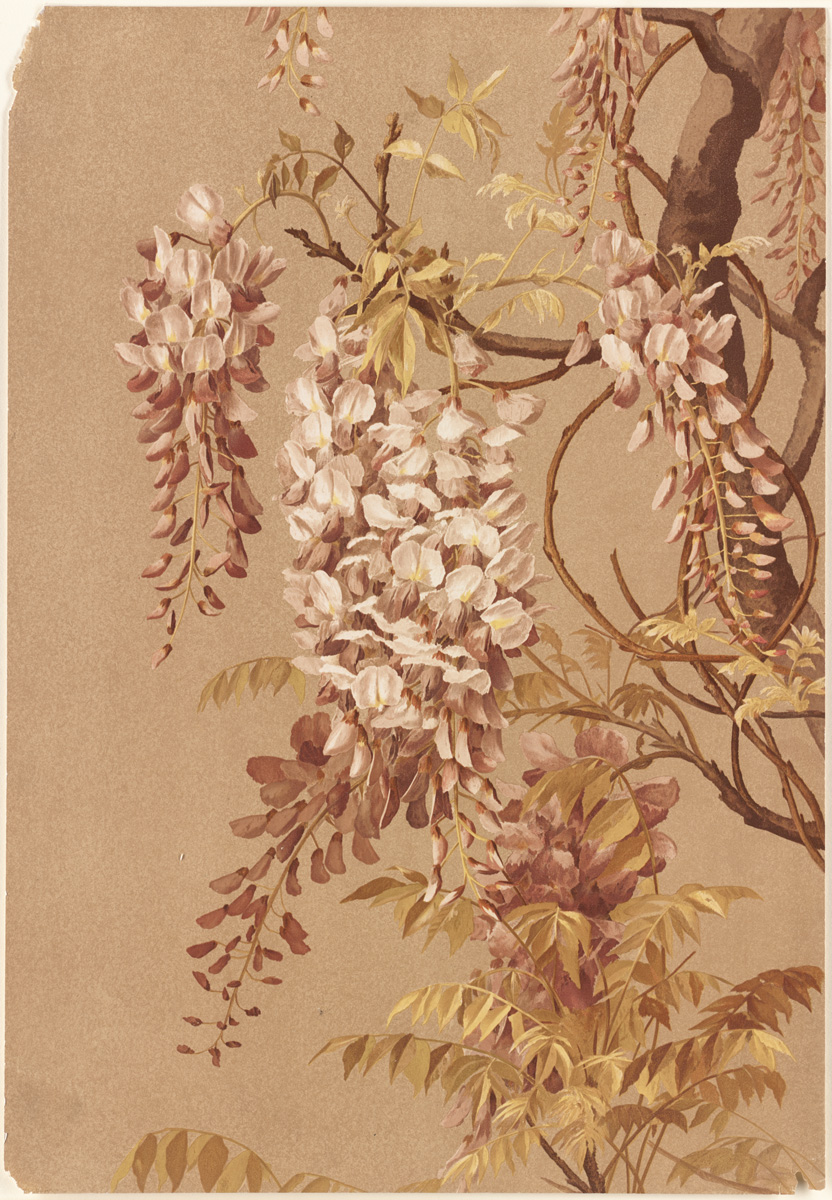
Purple Wisteria, chromolithograph (Boston Public Library)

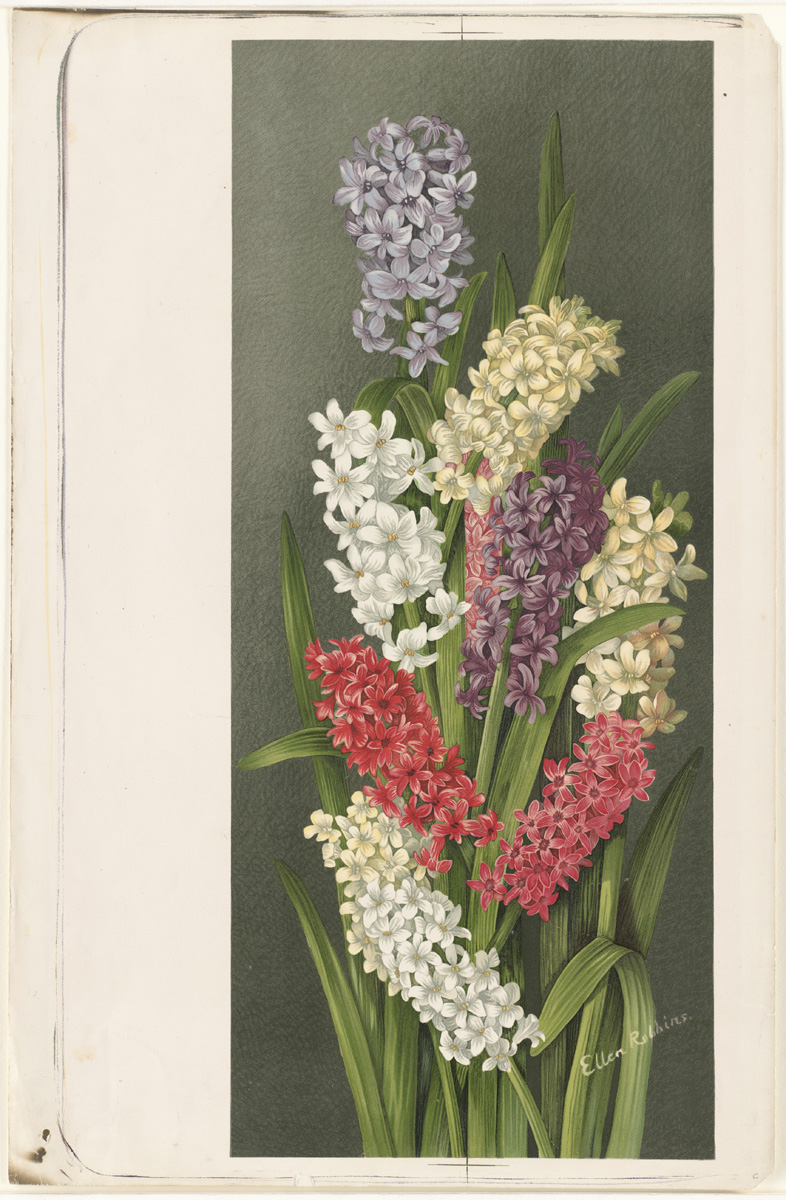
Hyacinths, chromolithograph (Boston Public Library)

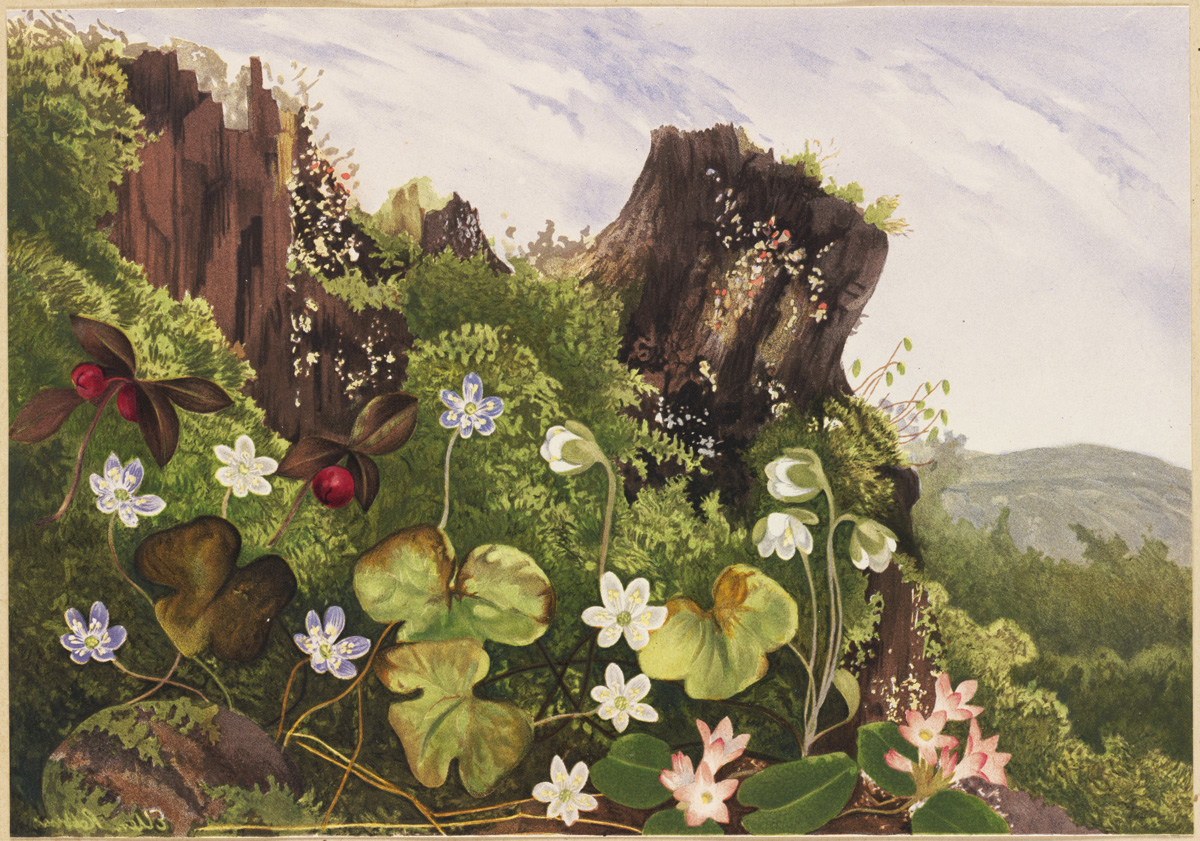
Wild Flowers No. 2, chromolithograph (Boston Public Library)
