= Henry Theodore Tuckerman =

American writer (1813–1871)

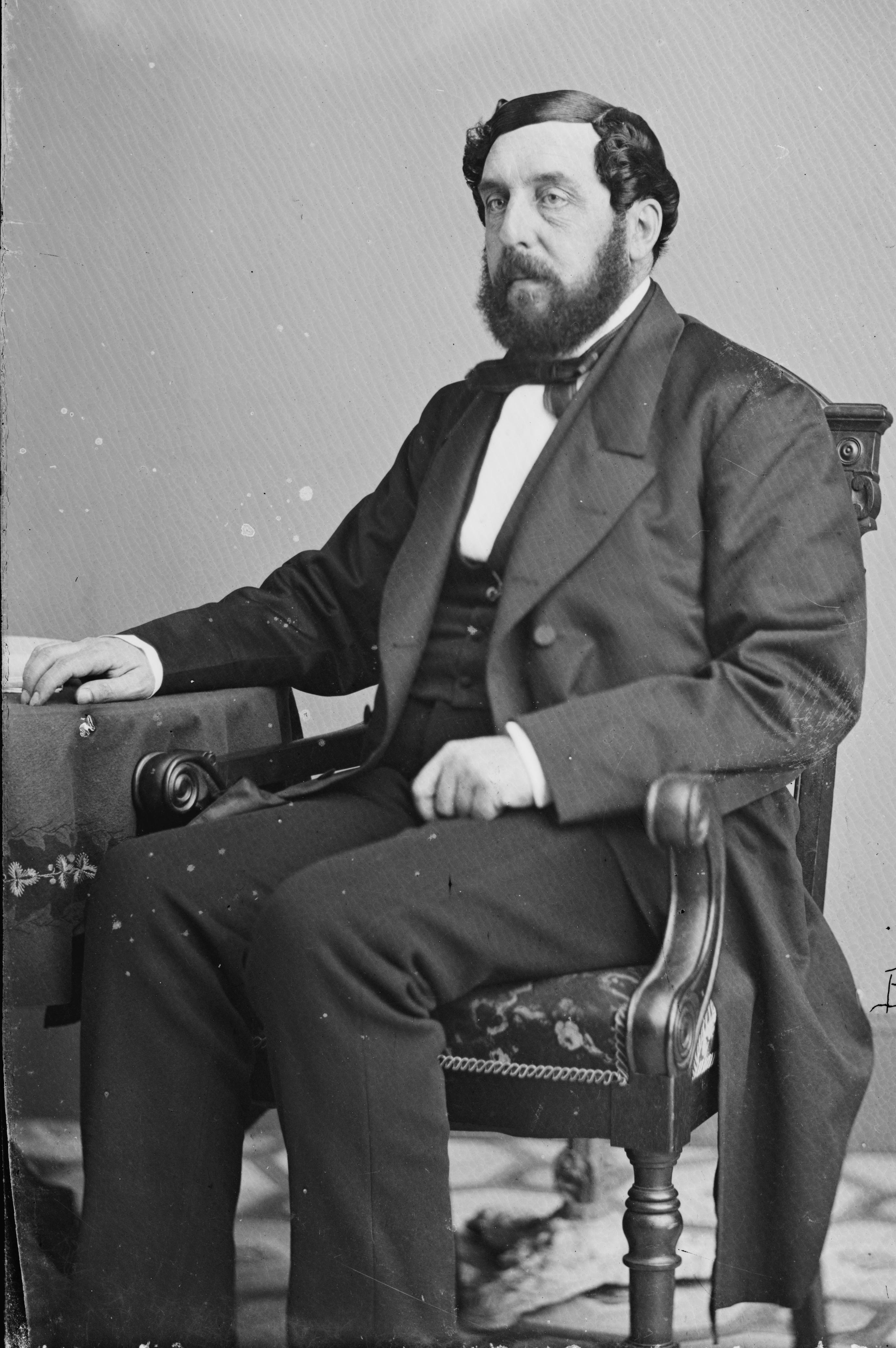
- Born: August 20, 1813; Boston, Massachusetts, U.S.
- Died: December 17, 1871 (aged 58); Manhattan, New York, U.S.
- Occupations: Writer, essayist, critic
- Relatives: Charles Keating Tuckerman (brother); Edward Tuckerman (cousin); Samuel Parkman Tuckerman (cousin); Frederick Goddard Tuckerman (cousin)

Henry Theodore Tuckerman (April 20, 1813 – December 17, 1871) was an American writer, essayist and critic.

== Early life ==
Henry Theodore Tuckerman was born on April 20, 1813, in Boston, Massachusetts.

His first cousins included Edward Tuckerman (1817–1886), the botanist, Samuel Parkman Tuckerman (1819–1890), the composer, Sophia May Eckley (1823-1874), the writer and spiritualist medium, and Frederick Goddard Tuckerman (1821–1873), the poet.

== Career ==
He was a sympathetic and delicate critic, with a graceful style. He wrote extensively both in prose and verse. He traveled extensively in Italy, which influenced his choice of subjects in his earlier writings. These include The Italian Sketchbook (1835); his only novel, Isabel; or Sicily. A Pilgrimage (1839); Thoughts on the Poets (1846); two volumes of verse, Poems (1851) and A Sheaf of Verse Bound for the Fair (1864); Leaves from the Diary of a Dreamer: Found among his Papers (1853); Essays, Biographical and Critical: or, Studies of Character (1857); The Criterion; Or the Test of Talk About Familiar Things. A Series of Essays (1866); and Book of the Artists: American Artist Life, Comprising Biographical and Critical Sketches of American Artists: Preceded by an Historical Account of the Rise and Progress of Art in America (1867).

Articles that Tuckerman wrote for The Knickerbocker magazine include Love in a Lazzaret (1838), a vignette from his travels in Italy, New York Artists (1856), Something About Wine (1858), Newport Out of Season (1858), Italia Libera (1861), Paris: And Life There (1861), Obituary of John W. Francis, M.D., LL.D. (1861).

Tuckerman, "as America's most knowledgeable and dedicated Italophile, missed few opportunities to argue the case for Italian freedom, even though he expressed doubt ... whether Italians were ready to govern themselves. He read and spoke Italian [and] made extended visits to Italy in 1833-34 and 1837-38...." Tuckerman was a close friend of Herman Melville's and was prominent in the literary life of New York City after 1845.

Tuckerman wrote a book review for the North American Review that indirectly led to the United States offering Giuseppe Garibaldi a position as major general in the Union army during the Civil War. The review included a glowing tribute to Garibaldi. When it reached Garibaldi in Italy, he asked his friend Augusto Vecchi to write a letter of thanks on his behalf. Vecchi did so and also enclosed his own letter suggesting that the United States invite Garibaldi to aid the Union cause. The suggestion reached President Abraham Lincoln, the offer was made, but no agreement was reached because Garibaldi demanded the power to free the slaves, which Lincoln was not ready to do in 1861, and because, as the result of a misunderstanding, Garibaldi thought that he was being offered the supreme command of the Union army.

== Personal life ==
Tuckerman died of pneumonia on December 17, 1871 and his funeral was held on December 20, 1871, in New York.
