= Tuckerman =

Tuckerman may refer to:

- Tuckerman (surname)
- Tuckerman, Arkansas, United States
- Tuckerman Ravine, a glacial cirque in New Hampshire, United States
- Tuckerman Brewing Company, a brewery in New Hampshire, United States
