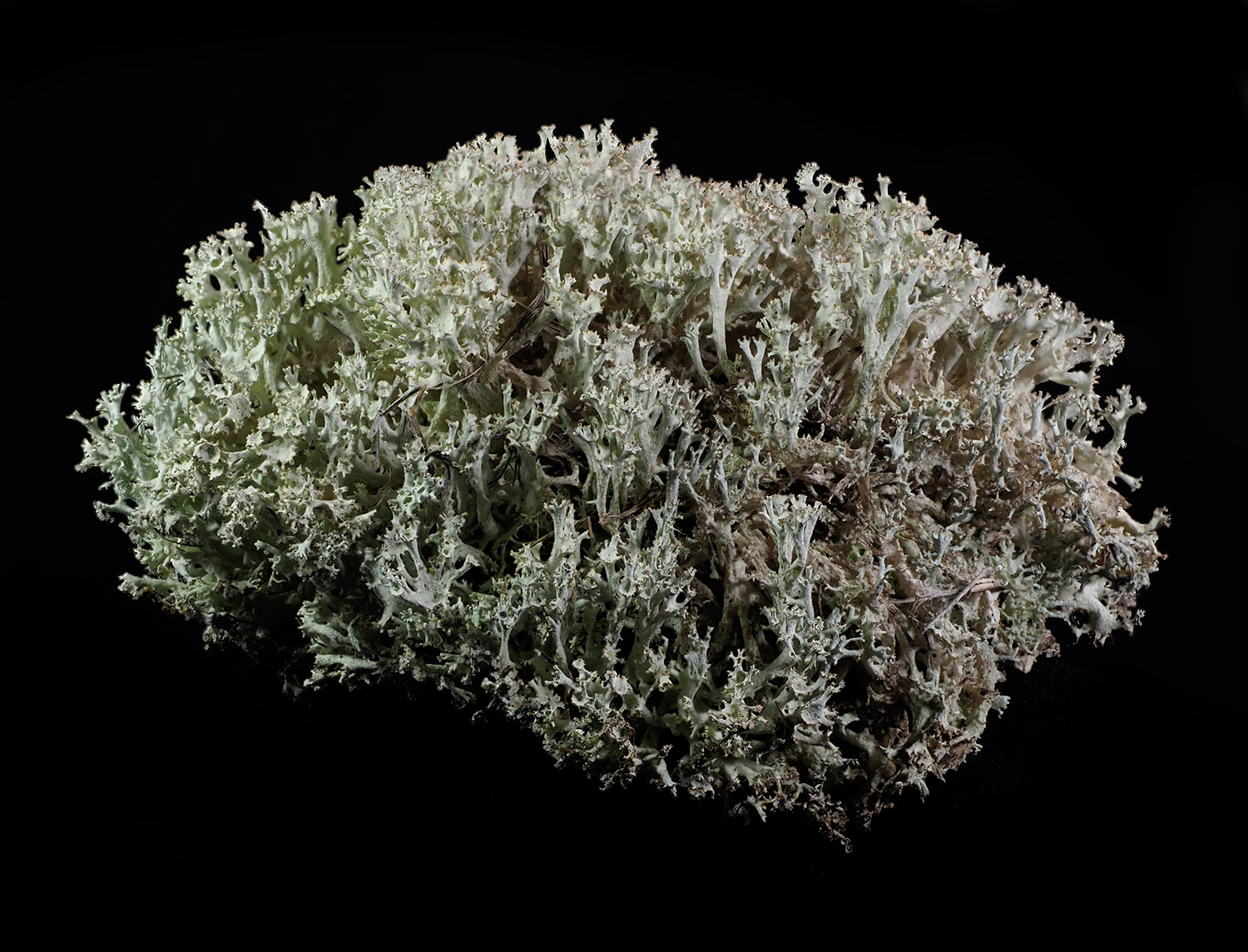
- Mature mass of Cladonia boryi, the fishnet lichen

Scientific classification
- Domain: Eukaryota
- Kingdom: Fungi
- Division: Ascomycota
- Class: Lecanoromycetes
- Order: Lecanorales
- Family: Cladoniaceae
- Genus: Cladonia
- Species: C. boryi

Binomial name
- Cladonia boryi Tuck.

= Cladonia boryi =

Species of lichen

Cladonia boryi, also commonly known as fishnet cladonia or fishnet lichen, is a species of lichen. It is distinctive in the genus Cladonia because the stalks (podetia) are very wide, seemingly hollow, and often perforated, hence the colloquial name - the fishnet lichen. It is also known as Bory's cup lichen.

== Description ==
Lichen grows into roundish masses up to 20 cm (7.9 in) or so in diameter; many masses may form a broad area on the ground. Podetia wider than most in Cladonia; the walls often being irregularly perforated. Podetia end in small coronets, tips of which are usually colored maroon.

== Range ==
Mostly reported from North East United States of America GBIF, occasional records from other locations including Japan.

== Habitat ==
Usually found on sand dunes, sand, or in forest glades.

== Taxonomy ==
Originally described by Edward Tuckerman in 1847. Now classified in the section Unciales Index Fungorum UUID: {5636B9BC-C79E-4041-87D6-3BC889939E0D}

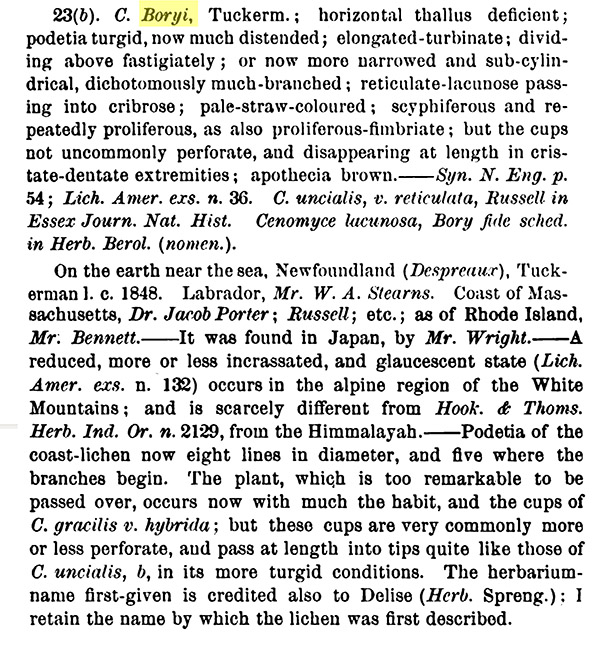
Description of Cladonia boryi by Tuckerman in his Synopsis of American Lichens (published 1882)
