= Tuckneraria =

Scientific classification
- Domain: Eukaryota
- Kingdom: Fungi
- Division: Ascomycota
- Class: Lecanoromycetes
- Order: Lecanorales
- Family: Parmeliaceae
- Genus: Tuckneraria; Randlane & A.Thell (1994)

Genus of fungi

Tuckneraria is a genus of lichen-forming fungi in the family Parmeliaceae.

== Taxonomy ==
The genus was circumscribed in Acta Bot. Fenn. vol.150 on pages 143–151 in 1994 by Tiina Randlane and Arne Thell.

The genus name honours Edward Tuckerman (1817–1886), who was an American botanist and professor who made significant contributions to the study of lichens and other alpine plants. He was a founding member of the Natural History Society of Boston and most of his career was spent at Amherst College. Tuckermannopsis, Nephromopsis combined with Cetraria.

== Species ==
As accepted by Species Fungorum;

- Tuckneraria laureri (Kremp.) Randlane & A. Thell (1994)
- Tuckneraria laxa (Zahlbr.) Randlane & A. Thell (1994)
- Tuckneraria pseudocomplicata (Asahina) Randlane & Saag (1994)

Former species;

- T. ahtii Randlane & Saag (1994) = Nephromopsis ahtii
- T. sikkimensis Divakar & Upreti (2006) = Nephromopsis sikkimensis
- T. togashii (Asahina) Randlane & A. Thell (1995) = Nephromopsis togashii
