= Robert Hollander =

American scholar and translator (1933–2021)

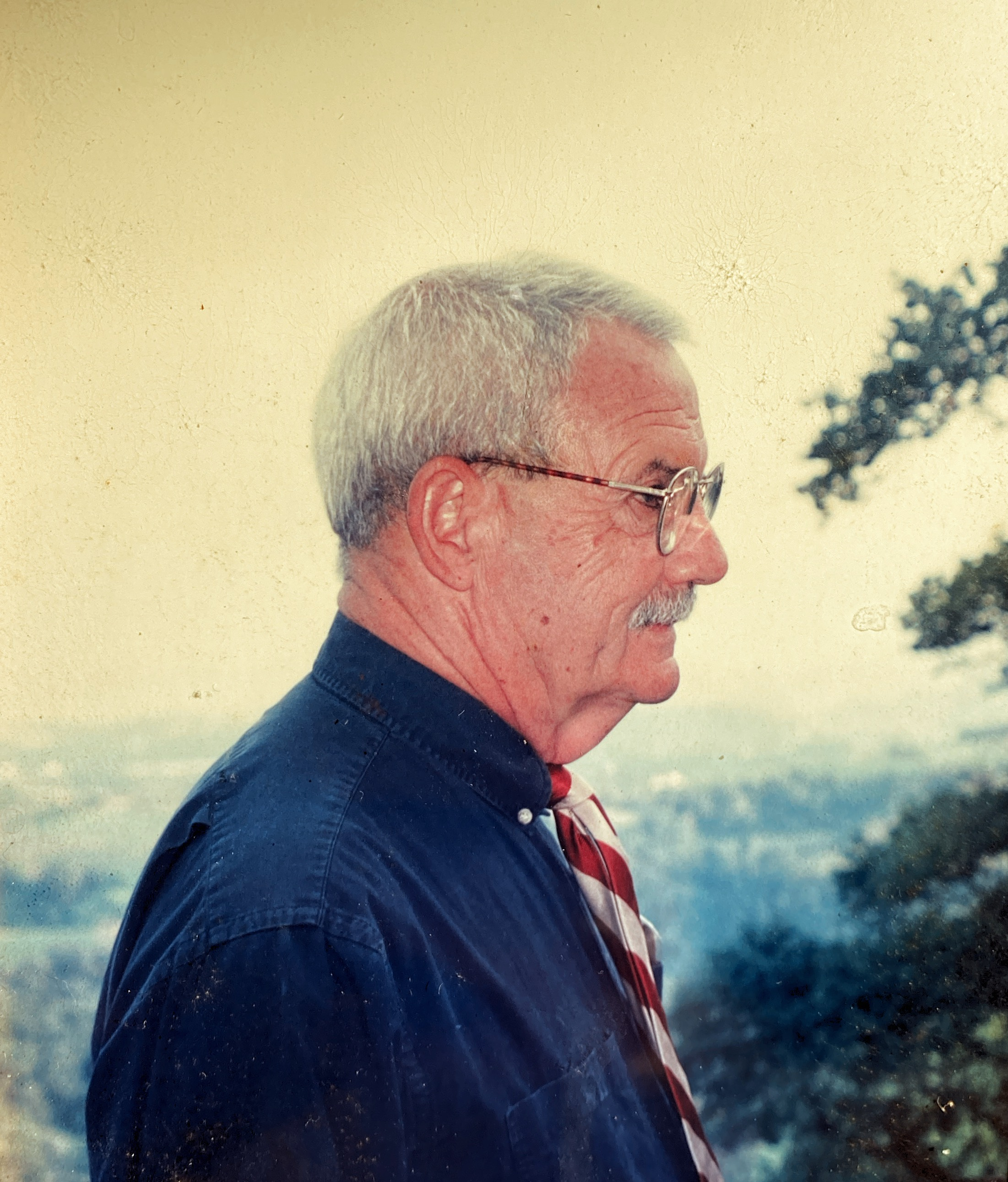
- Robert Hollander (early 2000s)
- Born: Robert B. Hollander Jr. July 31, 1933; Manhattan, New York City
- Died: April 20, 2021 (aged 87); Pau'uilo, Hawaii
- Spouse: Jean Haberman (m. 1964; died 2019)

Academic background
- Education: Collegiate School; Princeton University; Columbia University

Academic work
- Discipline: European literature
- Sub-discipline: Medieval Italian literature; Dante studies
- Institutions: Princeton University

Robert B. Hollander Jr. (Note: "B" is the full middle name.) (July 31, 1933 – April 20, 2021) was an American academic and translator, most widely known for his work on Dante Alighieri and Giovanni Boccaccio. He was described by a department chair at Princeton University as "a pioneer in the creation of digital resources for the study of literature" for his work on the electronic Princeton and Dartmouth Dante projects. In 2008, he and his wife, Jean Hollander, co-received a Gold Florin award from the City of Florence for their English translation of Dante's Divine Comedy.

== Early life and education ==
Hollander was born in Manhattan in 1933. His father was a financier and his mother was a nurse. He graduated from Collegiate School in 1951.

Hollander received a B.A. in French and English from Princeton University in 1955 and a Ph.D from Columbia University's department of English and Comparative Literature in 1962. His dissertation for the latter was on Edwin Muir.

== Career ==
Hollander began teaching at Princeton University in 1962, eventually taking emeritus status as a professor in 2003.

In 1982, Hollander began working on the Dartmouth Dante Project, a digital collection of over seventy commentaries on the Divine Comedy dating back to 1322. This was one of the first instances of computer technology being used in literature studies, and encouraged more advances in digital humanities. Forty years later, literature scholar Jeffrey Schnapp called the project a "go-to tool."

Hollander was elected president of the Dante Society of America from 1979 to 1985. He was head of Princeton University's Butler College from 1991 to 1995 and chair of their Department of Comparative Literature from 1994 to 1998.

In 1997, Robert and Jean Hollander began working on an English translation of the Divine Comedy. The couple's Inferno, Purgatorio, and Paradiso were released in 2000, 2003, and 2007 respectively. The translation was critically acclaimed, with novelist Tim Parks calling their Inferno “the finest of them all” and critic Joan Acocella calling their entire Comedy “the best on the market.” Robert's notes to the translation were recognized as being especially thorough, with Acocella estimating that they were "almost thirty times as long as the text."

== Personal life ==
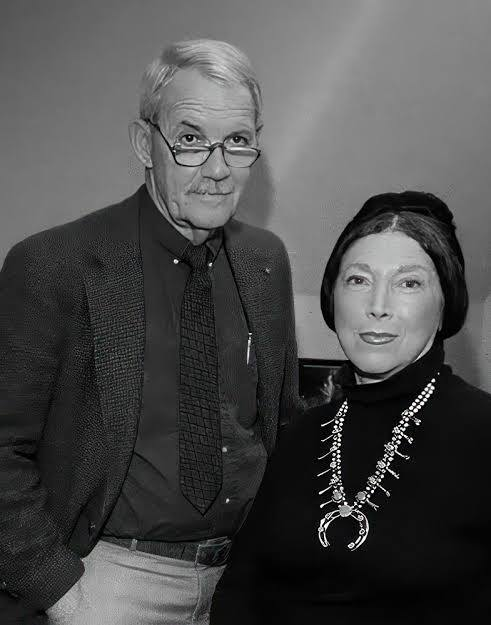
Robert and Jean Hollander (2001)

Robert and Jean Hollander (née Haberman) met as graduate students at Columbia University. They married in 1964 and had three children, one of whom died in infancy. They moved first to Princeton, New Jersey, and then in 1965 moved to 10 acres (4.0 ha) of woods at the base of Sourland Mountain in Hopewell Township, Mercer County, New Jersey, where they were longtime residents. Jean Hollander died in 2019.

From 1977 onwards, Hollander's former students had an annual tradition of returning to the professor's former classroom and reading from Dante's Divine Comedy together.

== Death and legacy ==
Hollander died on April 20, 2021, at his son's home in Pa'auilo, Hawaii. Italian news agency Agenzia Nazionale Stampa Associata noted that his death was only several months away from the 700th anniversary of Dante's own death. Hollander received full length obituaries in The Washington Post, The New York Times and La Voce di New York.

== Awards and honors ==
- Guggenheim Fellowship, 1970
- National Endowment for the Humanities Senior Fellowship, 1982-83
- Gold medal of the City of Florence, 1988
- John Witherspoon Award in the Humanities, 1988
- Bronze medal of the City of Tours, 1993
- Rockefeller Foundation Grant, 1993
- Honorary Citizen of Certaldo, 1997
- International Nicola Zingarelli Prize, 1999
- Elected to membership in the American Academy of Arts and Sciences, 2005
- Gold Florin award from the City of Florence, 2008

== Publications ==
=== Books ===
- Allegory in Dante's "Commedia." Princeton: Princeton University Press, 1969.
- Boccaccio's Two Venuses. New York: Columbia University Press, 1977.
- Studies in Dante. Ravenna: Longo, 1980.
- Il Virgilio dantesco: tragedia nella "Commedia." [The Dantean Virgil: Tragedy in the “Comedy”] Translated by Anna Maria Castellini & Margherita Frankel. Florence: Olschki, 1983.
- Boccaccio's Last Fiction: "Il Corbaccio." Philadelphia: University of Pennsylvania Press, 1988.
- Dante's Epistle to Cangrande. Ann Arbor: University of Michigan Press, 1993.
- Boccaccio's Dante and the Shaping Force of Satire. Ann Arbor: University of Michigan Press, 1997.
- Dante Alighieri. Rome: Marzorati-Editalia, 2000.
- Dante. New Haven & London: Yale University Press, 2001. (Paperback reprint, 2015.)
- The Elements of Grammar in Ninety Minutes. New York: Dover Publications, 2011.

=== Translations ===
All of the following co-written with Jean Hollander

- Dante, Inferno. Doubleday, 2000. (Anchor paperback edition: 2002.)
- Dante, Purgatorio. Doubleday, 2003. (Anchor paperback edition: 2004.)
- Dante, Paradiso. Doubleday, 2007. (Anchor paperback edition: 2008.)

=== Articles ===
- Robert Hollander (Translating Dante into English Again and Again) and Jean Hollander (Getting Just a Small Part of it Right). In: Ronald de Roy (ed.): Divine Comedies for the New Millennium. Recent Dante Translations in America and the Netherlands. Amsterdam: Amsterdam University Press, 2003. pp. 43-54.

== See also ==
- List of English translations of the Divine Comedy
