= Frederick Goddard Tuckerman =

American poet (1821–1873)

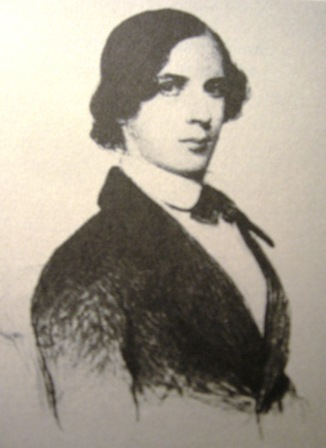
- Engraving of F.G. Tuckerman as a young man
- Born: February 4, 1821; Boston, Massachusetts, US
- Died: May 9, 1873; Greenfield, Massachusetts, US
- Education: Harvard University
- Occupation: Poet
- Spouse: Hannah Lucinda Jones
- Relatives: Edward Tuckerman (brother); Samuel Parkman Tuckerman (brother); Sophia May Eckley (sister); Henry Theodore Tuckerman (cousin)
- Writing career
- Movement: Romantic

Frederick Goddard Tuckerman (February 4, 1821 – May 9, 1873) was an American poet, remembered mostly for his sonnet series. Apart from the 1860 publication of his book Poems, which included approximately two-fifths of his lifetime sonnet output and other poetic works in a variety of forms, the remainder of his poetry was published posthumously in the 20th century. Attempts by several 20th-century scholars and critics to spark wider interest in his life and works have met with some success and Tuckerman is now included in several important anthologies of American poetry. Though his works appear in 19th-century anthologies of American poetry and sonnets, this reclusive contemporary of Emily Dickinson, sometime correspondent of Nathaniel Hawthorne, Ralph Waldo Emerson and Henry Wadsworth Longfellow, and acquaintance of Alfred, Lord Tennyson, remains in relative obscurity.

== Early life ==
Frederick Goddard Tuckerman was born on February 4, 1821, in Boston, Massachusetts, to Edward Francis Tuckerman (1775–1843) and Sophia May (1784–1870), a prosperous and distinguished Boston family. His siblings included: Hannah Parkman Tuckerman (1805–1859), Edward Tuckerman (1817–1886), the botanist, Samuel Parkman Tuckerman (1819–1890), the composer, and Sophia May Eckley (1823–1874), the spiritualist. His first cousin was Henry Theodore Tuckerman (1813–1871), an American writer, essayist and critic.

He entered Harvard University in 1841, but did not remain long, due to an eye problem, as recalled in a family genealogy, privately printed in 1917 by a relative, Bayard Tuckerman. After Harvard, he entered the law school, graduating in 1842, and was admitted to the Suffolk Bar, reading with Edward D. Sohier (1810–1888). He later abandoned the practice of law, saying that it was distasteful. He then devoted himself to the pursuit of his favorite studies, literature, botany and astronomy.

In 1847, he moved to Greenfield, in western Massachusetts due to his love of nature and began living a life of relative seclusion and retirement, which was considered strange one for a man in his middle twenties.

== Career ==
While Tuckerman preferred isolation, he traveled abroad, meeting at least one famous poet, and communicated with several other American writers of note. According to N. Scott Momaday, "In 1851, and again in 1854, Tuckerman journeyed abroad. On the first of these excursions he met Alfred, Lord Tennyson; on the second he was Tennyson's guest at Farringford. The friendship between the two men appears to have been fast and of long standing. We do not know what Tennyson thought of Tuckerman's poetry. On the second visit with Tennyson, the poet laureate gave him the original manuscript of Locksley Hall. Tuckerman published Poems in 1860; it was his only poetry collection published in his lifetime. "The American writers to whom Tuckerman sent complimentary copies of the 1860 Poems are an impressive lot. The list of recipients includes the names of Emerson, Hawthorne, Longfellow, Bryant, and Jones Very." The responses he received were polite and favorable. They generally distinguished "the intrinsic merit of Tuckerman's work and 'external success'", the likelihood of it meeting popular success "with the world". "The printing of Tuckerman's volume of poems in 1860 was the high point of his public career. When he had made his claim on the attention of the most respected literary men of his day, he returned to his seclusion. He continued to write, indeed, the best of his work was yet to come, but he never again exposed himself to the world."

=== Poetry ===
Momaday offers a general estimation of the poet and the poetry: "Tuckerman was a man who made herbariums. He had an eye for the minutest aspects of the world. When he wished to focus upon the veins of a leaf, or to find a metaphor for the appearance of an evergreen spine, he could do so with extraordinary skill. His poems are remarkable, point-blank descriptions of nature; they are filled with small, precise, and whole things: purring bees and vervain spikes, shives and amaryllis, wind flowers and stramony. But Tuckerman has more to recommend him than an eye and a nomenclature. His sensibilities are refined; his sensitivity is acute. His experience is pervaded by an always apparent sense of grief. He knows well the side of Man that is most vulnerable to pain, and he treats of it throughout his work with respect and compassion, often with great power and beauty.

But he was also a poet of the nineteenth century, and one who admired Tennyson above others. There is a good deal of bad writing in Tuckerman, and there are many obscurities... [the faults] occur for the most part in the longer poems, especially those of narrative character. Often they are marred by a tediousness of expression and an overwrought consistency of mood."

Edmund Wilson comments on the issue of Tuckerman's obscurity: "One of the queerest features of Tuckerman's work is his habit of alluding, not merely to characters from Biblical or classical antiquity so obscure that one cannot believe they are real till one finds them in a concordance or a classical dictionary, but also to personages who cannot be found because their names have been made up by the poet."

Wilson draws a comparison between Tuckerman and the work of Emily Dickinson and wonders at the missed intersection between the lives and work of these two reclusive, western Massachusetts poets, as well as with the correspondent and literary mentor of Dickinson, Thomas Wentworth Higginson: "Tuckerman's occasional obscurity, like that of Emily Dickinson, contributes to one's general impression of a soliloquy not quite overheard. It is interesting that Emily Dickinson should have known Frederick's brother Edward, who taught botany at Amherst College, and also Tuckerman's son and his son's wife. There is a good deal about the Tuckermans in Emily's letters; but—though Greenfield is not far from Amherst — there is no mention of Frederick Goddard. Did Emily know that the father of her friend, almost as much a recluse as herself, was writing remarkable poetry? Had Tuckerman ever been told that Emily Dickinson wrote? Colonel Thomas Wentworth Higginson—though he and Tuckerman had been classmates at Harvard—had no notion of Tuckerman's talent. Old Higginson was still alive when Tuckerman was rediscovered [see below], and in response to an inquiry by Witter Bynner, he explained that he remembered his contemporary 'as a refined and gentlemanly fellow, but I did not then know him as a poet'."

=== Romanticism ===
Eugene England discusses Tuckerman's position as a Romantic poet and his work in relation to that of Ralph Waldo Emerson: "He is not merely a Romantic, nor yet exclusively an anti-Romantic; not just influenced by Emerson or simply reacting against Emerson's excesses... With the Romantics, Tuckerman yearned to be at home in the universe, to feel himself deeply related to its central reality, and he understood and participated in various efforts to bring that about—including the Emersonian temptation to assert a pantheism that would make everything divine and thus destroy all ethical distinctions and exalt simple merging, including the final merge of death. But Tuckerman also realized that alienation is part of the price we pay for our humanness, for conscious life and perceived feeling, that the void between the mind and the world remains, unless we destroy the mind in primitivism or death—or do away with the world in some form of subjectivism.

== Revival of interest ==
In 1909, Walter Prichard Eaton, drama critic and essayist, wrote an article in Forum about Tuckerman and his poetry, after seeing two sonnets in an unpublished manuscript of an anthology of American poems written by Louis How. This article inspired Witter Bynner to enter into correspondence with one of the poet's grandchildren, thereby finding the manuscripts for the remaining sonnets. He published the results in 1931.

N. Scott Momaday brought out the most complete edition available of Tuckerman's works in 1965, with a quirky ("Winters's heretical, obdurate foreword") Critical Foreword by Yvor Winters and a biographical/critical introduction by Momaday.

Another writer cited by Momaday in his survey of the revival of interest in Tuckerman's poetry is Edmund Wilson, in his work Patriotic Gore. In that work, Wilson predicted a permanent revival of Tuckerman and his works after the publication of his most famous ode: "A further posthumous poem, The Cricket, was printed, in 1950, as a leaflet by the Cummington Press of Cummington, Massachusetts. So Tuckerman has emerged at last from the obscurity which the retirement of his life invited." Wilson also provides an appreciative short summary of Tuckerman and his works, citing several poems in their entirety.

The only recent critical work of significant length on Tuckerman and his work is Beyond Romanticism: Tuckerman's Life and Poetry (1991), by Eugene England.

A selection of Tuckerman's poetry appears in Three American Poets (2003), edited by Jonathan Bean. His sonnets are sprinkled through several American poetry and sonnet anthologies. The Library of America's American Poetry: The Nineteenth Century, Vol. 2 (1993) contains over 20 selections.

The most recent selection is Selected Poems of Frederick Goddard Tuckerman (The John Harvard Library) (2010), edited by Ben Mazer.

== Personal life ==
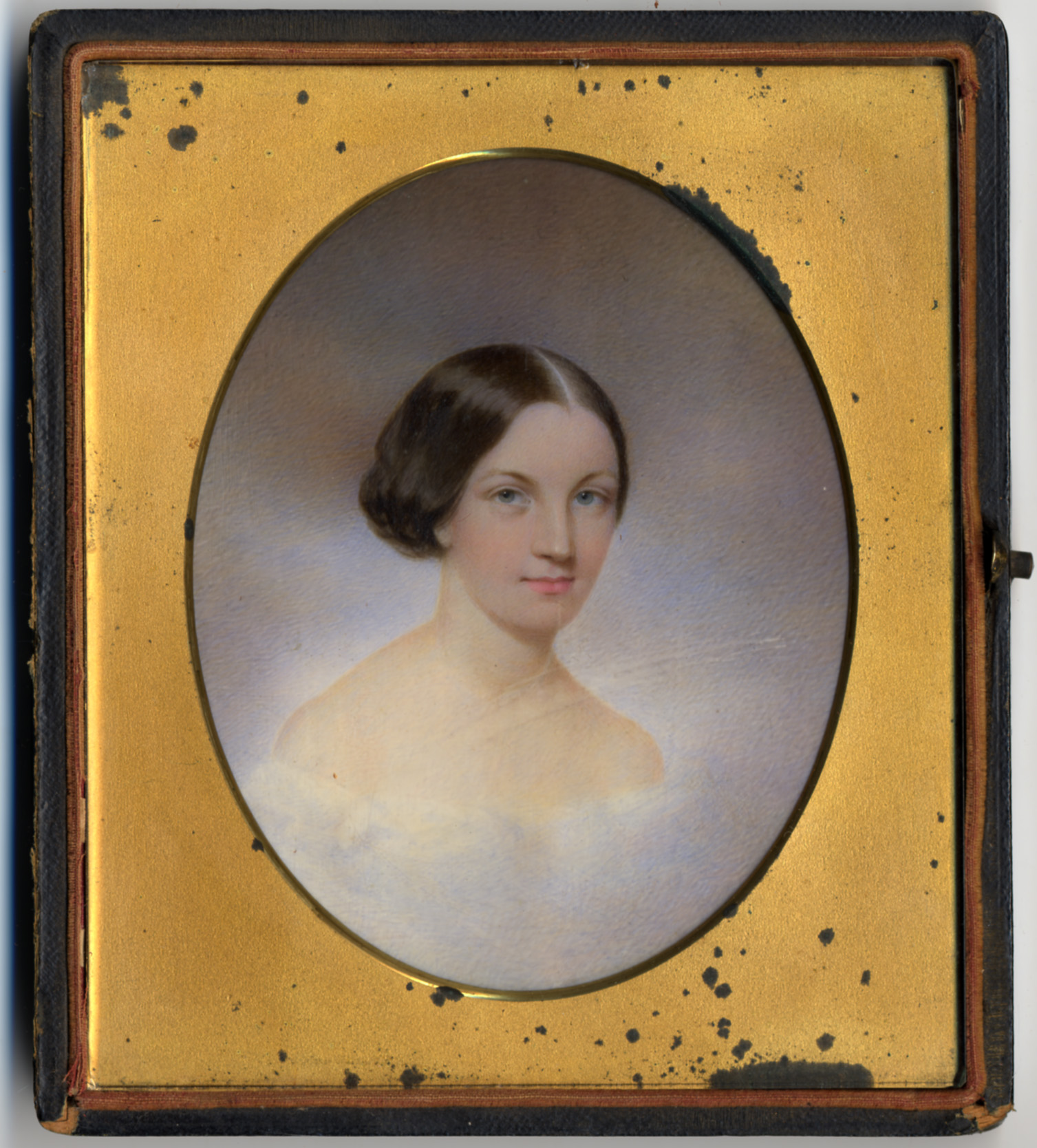
Hannah Lucinda Jones Tuckerman

In 1847, coinciding with his move to Greenfield, he married Hannah Lucinda Jones (1827–1857), a dark-haired, gentle woman, whose disposition was well suited to his own. Ten years later, Hannah died, after the birth of her third child. It has been said that her death was the deepest hurt of Tuckerman's life and the "beginning of his final solitude."

- Infant Daughter (1848–1848)
- Edward Tuckerman (1850–1871)
- Anna Tuckerman (1853–1954)

Tuckerman died May 9, 1873, in Greenfield.

=== Honors ===
Poet's Seat Tower is a 1912 sandstone observation tower in Greenfield named for the site's attraction to poets, particularly Tuckerman.
