= Charles S. Singleton =

American scholar of literature (1909–1985)

- Born: Charles Southward Singleton; April 21, 1909; McLoud, OK
- Died: October 10, 1985 (aged 76); Carroll County, MD
- Awards: Guggenheim Fellowship; Haskins Medal; Premio Galilei (1963)

Academic background
- Education: University of Missouri (BA); University of California, Berkeley (PhD)

Academic work
- Discipline: Italian Literature
- Sub-discipline: Dante Studies

Charles Southward Singleton (21 April 1909 – 10 October 1985) was an American scholar, writer, and critic of literature. He was an expert on the work of Dante Alighieri and Giovanni Boccaccio. He wrote An Essay on the Vita Nuova (1949) and Dante Studies (I vol. in 1954). He studied, as did the German critic Erich Auerbach, the allegorical interpretation of Dante's Divine Comedy, a work which he also translated into literal English prose with commentary in six volumes. Irma Brandeis and Robert M. Durling were two of his disciples.

== Life and career ==
Singleton earned his associated bachelor's from the University of Missouri in 1931 and went on to receive his doctorate from the University of California at Berkeley in 1936. From 1937 until his death, he taught at Johns Hopkins University, except from 1948 to 1957, when he filled the chair in Italian studies at Harvard.

In 1950, Singleton was elected to the American Academy of Arts and Sciences. He was elected to the American Philosophical Society in 1962. He gave the lecture: "The Vistas in Retrospect" in 1965 at the Congresso Internazionale di Studi Danteschi in Florence where he received the golden medal for Dante Studies whose other honorees include T. S. Eliot and André Pezard.
