= Robert Torrance =

American literary critic (born 1939)

Robert M. Torrance (May 9, 1939 – February 16, 2016) was professor emeritus of Comparative Literature at UC Davis.

Torrance received his B.A. from Harvard in Greek and English, his M.A. at UC Berkeley in Comparative Literature, and his Ph.D. at Harvard in Comparative Literature. After teaching at Harvard and at Brooklyn College of CUNY, he moved to UC Davis in 1976. During his 25 years at Davis, he served several terms as both director and graduate adviser.

== Bibliography ==
- Sophocles "The Women of Trachis" and "Philoctetes": A New Verse Translation, Houghton-Mifflin (1966).
- The Comic Hero, Harvard University Press (1978) ISBN 0-674-14431-7
- Ideal and Spleen: The Crisis of Transcendent Vision in Romantic, Symbolist, and Modern Poetry, Garland (1987) ISBN 0-8240-8436-5
- Encompassing Nature: A Sourcebook (editor), Counterpoint (1998) ISBN 1-8871784-3-0
- The Spiritual Quest: Transcendence in Myth, Religion, and Science, University of California Press (1994) ISBN 0-520-21159-6
- Dante's Inferno, A New Translation in Terza Rima, X-libris (2011) ISBN 1-4628-4518-5
