= Samuel Parkman Tuckerman =

American composer (1819 – 1890)

Samuel Parkman Tuckerman (February 11, 1819 – June 30, 1890) was an American composer.

== Early life and education ==
He was born in Boston to Edward Francis Tuckerman (1775–1843), a merchant, and Sophia May (1784–1870), a prosperous and distinguished Boston family. His siblings were Edward Tuckerman (1817–1886), the botanist and Amherst professor, Frederick Goddard Tuckerman (1821–1873), the poet, Sophia May (Tuckerman) Eckley, and Hannah Parkman Tuckerman.

He attended Chauncy Hall School in Boston. He studied with Charles Zeuner, and was then for several years organist at St. Paul's Church, Boston. He went to England in 1849, and the degree of Mus. Doc. was conferred on him by the Archbishop of Canterbury in 1853. In the preceding year he had received a diploma from the Academy of St. Cecilia in Rome.

== Work ==
While studying with Zeuner, he published The Episcopal Harp (1844) and The National Lyre (1848), the latter with Silas A. Bancroft and Henry K. Oliver. As a composer he gave his attention chiefly to sacred music, principally services, hymns, and anthems for the Episcopal Church service. He compiled Cathedral Chants (London, 1852) and Trinity Collection of Church Music (1864).

After returning to the United States he lectured on sacred music, and gave performances of church music of the period from the 4th to the 19th centuries. He went again to England in 1856, and a third time in 1868, returning in 1879.

== Personal life ==
Samuel married Mary Olivia Edwards Perry on October 15, 1845. They had a daughter:

- Mary Perry Tuckerman (born November 11, 1846)

He died in Newport, Rhode Island and is buried at Mount Auburn Cemetery.
