= Sophia May Eckley =

American woman poet

- Sophia May Eckley and her half-sister, Hannah Tuckerman Mason, portrait by G. P. A. Healy
- Born: July 9, 1823; Boston
- Died: September 15, 1874; Arques-la-Bataille
- Resting place: Père Lachaise Cemetery
- Occupation: Writer
- Parents: Edward Francis Tuckerman III (father); Sophia Tuckerman (mother)

Sophia May Eckley (July 9, 1823 – September 15, 1874) was an American poet and spiritualist medium who had a close relationship with the poet Elizabeth Barrett Browning.

== Life and career ==
Eckley was born in Boston, Massachusetts in 1823. Her parents were Edward Francis Tuckerman, III, a wealthy merchant, and Sophia May Tuckerman. Both of her parents came from prominent Massachusetts families. Through her mother, Eckley was a second cousin of Louisa May Alcott and a descendant of the early English colonist John May. Eckley's siblings included the botanist Edward Tuckerman and the poet Frederick Goddard Tuckerman.

In 1848, she married David Eckley, Jr., with whom she had two sons. One of her sons, William, died the year following his birth. In the 1850s, Eckley moved with her family to Florence, Italy.

In 1863, Eckley and her husband separated, and she moved to Paris with her son, David, the following year. Eckley lived in Paris until her death in 1874.

=== Relationship with Elizabeth Barrett Browning ===
Eckley met Elizabeth Barrett Browning and her husband, Robert Browning, in 1857, while living in Florence. The women had a close and relationship, with Barrett Browning referring to Eckley as "sister" in several of her letters. Eckley's son David was reportedly friends with Barret Browning's son, Robert.

In 1858, Barrett Browning had a portrait of herself commissioned especially for Eckley.

By 1860, their relationship had cooled. The rift was reportedly caused by a disagreement over the truthfulness of Eckley's claims that she had communicated with the spirits of Barrett Browning's deceased family members.

The relationship between Eckley and Barrett Browning has been studied by several scholars, who consider it important to understanding the role of spiritualism in Barrett Browning's life and work. Much of the surviving correspondence, between Eckley and Barrett Browning can be found in the Berg Collection of the New York Public Library.

== Bibliography ==
Eckley published three books during the 1860s. The first, a travel log titled The Oldest of the Old World, was published in 1860, and details her travels in Egypt and Palestine. Elizabeth Barrett Browning was critical of the book, writing in a letter, "Have you read this book? It is of the calibre of a school-girl's exercise (& not a clever school-girl)."

Eckley also published two collections of poetry, titled Poems and Minor Chords, published in 1863 and 1869, respectively.

Eckley's sketchbook, which contains sketches of landscapes in Nahant, Massachusetts, is held at the Clements Library at the University of Michigan.
