= Robert M. Durling =

American scholar and translator (1929–2015)

Robert M. Durling (March 11, 1929 – May 21, 2015) was an American scholar and translator, known for his translations of Petrarch's Rime Sparse and (with Ronald Martinez) of Dante Alighieri's Divine Comedy. He was professor emeritus of Italian and English literature at the University of California, Santa Cruz. He died on May 21, 2015.

Durling was a student of Charles S. Singleton and took his course on the Comedy, a class he said "literally changed my life."

He graduated from Harvard University (BA, PhD).

== Bibliography ==
- The Figure of the Poet in Renaissance Epic. Cambridge: Harvard UP, 1966.
- Time and the Crystal: Studies in Dante's Rime Petrose (with Ronald L. Martinez). Berkeley and Los Angeles: U of California P, 1990.
