= Jean Hollander =

American poet and translator (1928–2019)

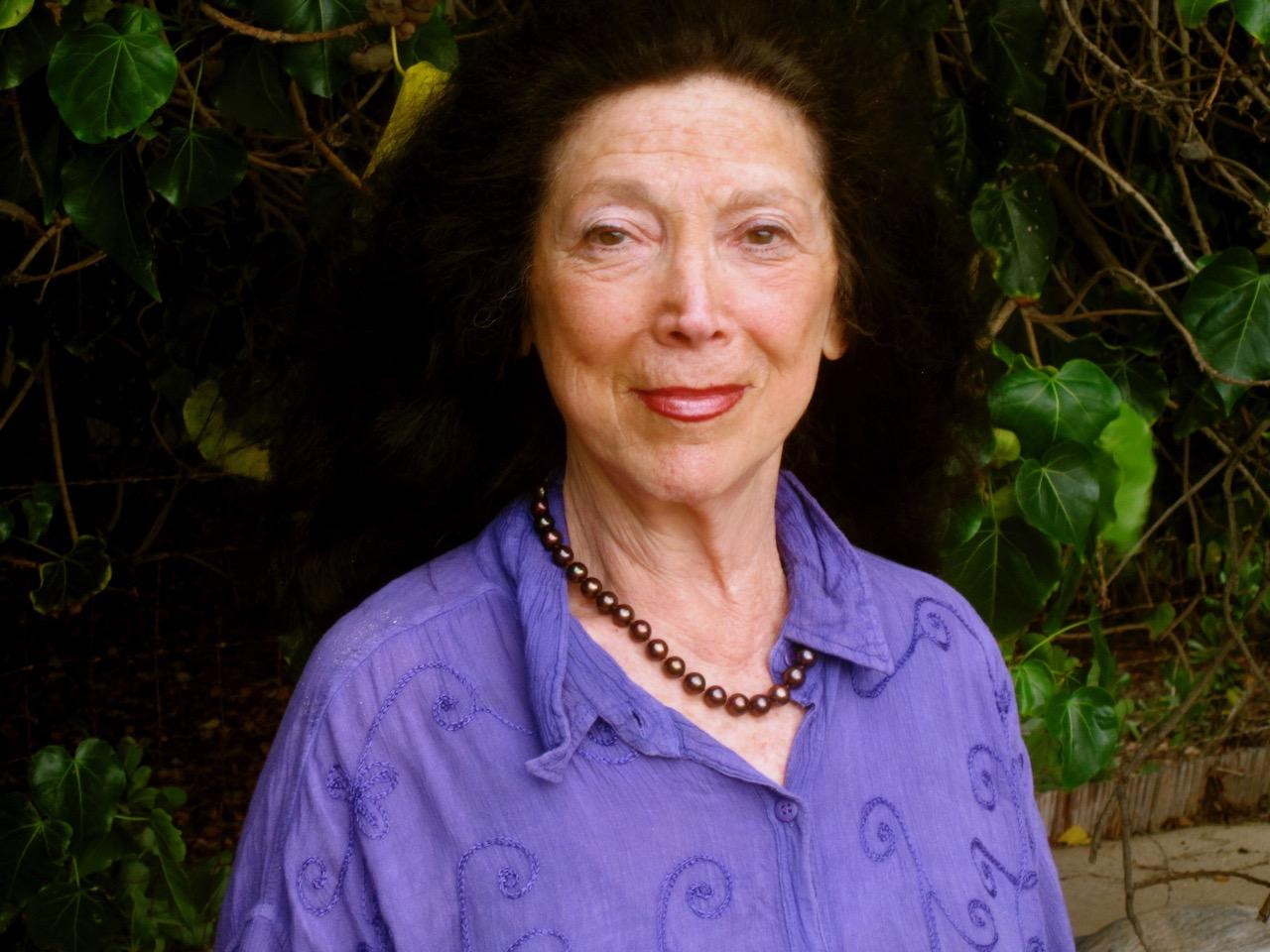
- Hollander photographed in the late 2000s.
- Born: Josefin Habermann; July 5, 1928; Vienna, Austria
- Died: April 10, 2019 (aged 90); Hopewell Township, Mercer County, New Jersey
- Education: Columbia University
- Occupations: Poet, translator
- Known for: her poems and for having translated Dante’s Divine Comedy
- Notable work: poetry collection And They Shall Wear Purple (2016)
- Spouse: Robert Hollander
- Children: 3

Jean Hollander (née Haberman; July 5, 1928 – April 10, 2019) was a poet, translator and teacher. Together with her husband Robert Hollander she published a verse translation of Dante Alighieri’s Divine Comedy, for which she was awarded the Gold Medal for Dante Translation from the City of Florence. She has taught literature and writing at Princeton University, Brooklyn College, Columbia University, where she did her graduate work, and The College of New Jersey, where she was director of the annual Writers’ Conference for twenty-three years. She was poetry editor and columnist at the Princeton Packet and has given over a hundred readings of her own poetry, as well as workshops at universities, libraries, bookstores, and poetry events, such as the Geraldine R. Dodge Poetry Festival, the University of Dallas, the Poetry Society of America, Barnes & Noble Reading Series in Manhattan and Princeton, Station WPFW for Voice of America, Harvard University, Poets House and others. She has published over three hundred poems in hundreds of magazines and anthologies, such as American Scholar, Asheville Poetry Review, Cumberland Poetry Review, Literary Review, National Review, Nimrod, Pegasus, Poem, Sewanee Review, Southern Humanities Review and others.

== Life ==
Josefin Haberman was born in Vienna, Austria, on July 5, to Isaak Haberman, who died at eighty-seven, and Francesca Haberman. She had a brother, William Haberman, whom she dedicated the poem to my brother expressing her feelings about a sometimes distant relationship and a sister, Charlotte Haberman. With her family, she fled Vienna after her father was released from concentration camp (he was at Bergen-Belsen and Dachau). They spent a year in Cuba and then came to the United States and lived in Brooklyn, NY. Jean attended Brooklyn College and did her graduate work at Columbia University, where she met her later husband, Robert Hollander, as graduate students. They married in 1964 and had three children: Elizabeth (July 5, 1965 – October 17, 1965), Cornelia Vanness "Zaz" Hollander (born January 21, 1968) and Robert B. Hollander III ('Buzz', September 11, 1969 – June 25, 2023). They moved first to Princeton, New Jersey, and then in 1965 moved to 10 acres (4.0 ha) of woods at the base of Sourland Mountain in Hopewell Township, Mercer County, New Jersey, where they were longtime residents. She died there of natural causes on April 10, 2019. She was fluent in German and Italian. She liked hiking trails from North Carolina to New Hampshire to Alaska as well as Switzerland, Norway and Peru.

== Poetic principles ==
As a teacher for the writing of poetry, Jean Hollander had no pretensions to theories of art for her own work. “I know that a poem is not a piece of furniture. It cannot be sat on, eaten, worn, or even used for comfort. Although poems may at times console, they may also make us feel worse. If I write out of some despair, the act of writing sometimes turns the knife deeper because grief sharpens it.” Although she recommended a daily scheduled time for poetry writing to her students, she had never adhered to one. “I write when I feel strongly about something: a childhood memory suddenly recalled, a dream that awakens terror or regret, a piece of music that calls up joy or sadness, a white moon that rises from the east larger than the sun, or the first blue periwinkle flowers that appear out of earth still littered with snow. At other times, when there is no new inspiration, but I still feel the need to write, I leaf through piles of poems begun years ago but never finished. Then a few lines here or there will arouse other thoughts and images and the words I failed to summon the previous time will suddenly appear and express what I could not say before. And so today and tomorrow and the days after, I shall continue working with poetry—reading, teaching, and writing poems—not only because I love to see words say and mean more than their dictionary definitions, but, above all, as many have insisted before, I shall write poems because I cannot help it.” “I try to wrest my thought or feeling into light. It is an act immediate and ugly, a brutal delivery, sometimes a stillbirth, always a struggle. I keep hoping that each new poem will be different from, and better than, the last.”

== Works ==
=== Poems ===
- Crushed into Honey, Saturday Press, 1986 (winner of the Eileen W. Barnes Award)
- Moondog, Quarterly Review of Literature, 1996 (winner in the QRL Poetry Book Series)
- Organs and Blood, David Robert Books, 2008
- Counterpoint (At Hand Poetry Chapbook Series), Bright Hill Press, 2011 (prize winner by Bright Hill Press) (translated into Italian in the September 2014 issue of Poesia, an Italian Poetry Magazine)
- Torn Love, David Robert Books, 2013
- And They Shall Wear Purple – New and Selected Poems, Sheep Meadow Press, Rhinebeck, New York 2016, ISBN 9781937679620, 269 p. (includes the former poetry editions, new poems and the translation of Inferno Canto I)

=== Translations ===
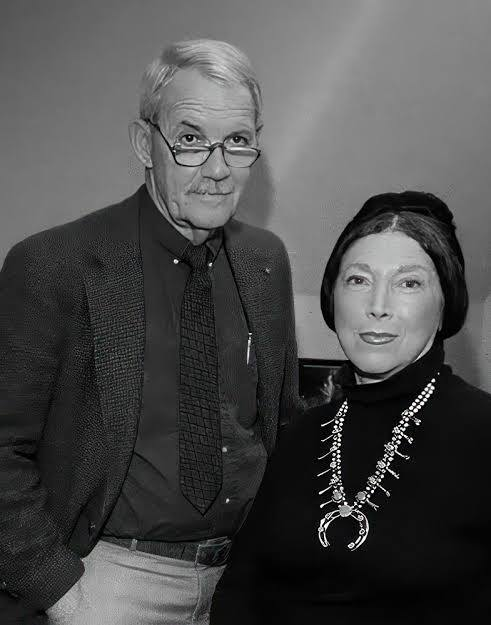
Robert and Jean Hollander (2001)

- Dante’s Inferno, Doubleday, New York 2000 (hardcover), and Anchor Books, New York 2002, ISBN 0-385-49698-2
- Dante’s Purgatorio, Doubleday, New York 2003 (hardcover), and Anchor Books, New York 2004, ISBN 0-385-49700-8
- Dante’s Paradiso, Doubleday, New York 2007 (hardcover), and Anchor Books, New York 2008, ISBN 978-1-4000-3115-3
- Hugo von Hofmannsthal, Woman Without a Shadow (original title Die Frau ohne Schatten), translated from German by Jean Hollander, Edwin Mellen Press, 1993, ISBN 0-7734-9282-8, 116 p.
- I am my own woman: the outlaw life of Charlotte von Mahlsdorf, Berlin's most distinguished transvestite, translated by Jean Hollander, Cleis Press, Pittsburgh 1995 (original title Ich bin meine eigene Frau), 179 p.

=== Articles ===
- Robert Hollander (Translating Dante into English Again and Again) and Jean Hollander (Getting Just a Small Part of it Right). In: Ronald de Roy (ed.): Divine Comedies for the New Millennium. Recent Dante Translations in America and the Netherlands. Amsterdam: Amsterdam University Press, 2003. pp. 43–54.

=== Translation of Dante's Divine Comedy ===
In 1997, Robert and Jean Hollander began working on an English translation of the Divine Comedy. The couple's Inferno, Purgatorio, and Paradiso were released in 2000, 2003, and 2007 respectively. The translation was critically acclaimed, with novelist Tim Parks calling their Inferno “the finest of them all” and critic Joan Acocella calling their entire Comedy “the best on the market.” Robert's notes to the translation were recognized as being especially thorough, with Acocella estimating that they were "almost thirty times as long as the text."

== Awards ==
- Eileen W. Barnes Award for Crushed into Honey, 1986
- 3 Poetry Fellowships from NJ State Council on the Arts
- Winner in the QRL Poetry Book Series for Moodog
- The Billie Murray Denny Poetry Contest (first prize of $1,000 for a single poem)
- Allen Ginsberg Award
- New Jersey State Council on the Arts Award (three times winner)
- Gold Florin from city of Florence for translation of Dante's Commedia, 2008
