= Bayard Tuckerman Jr. =

American jockey, businessman, and politician

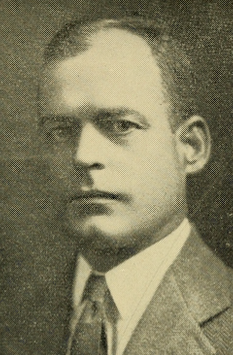

Member of the Massachusetts Governor's Council from the 5th District
- In office 1937–1941
- Preceded by: William G. Hennessey
- Succeeded by: James Augustine Donovan

Member of the Massachusetts House of Representatives from the 15th Essex District
- In office 1929–1931

Personal details
- Born: April 19, 1889 Morristown, New Jersey, U.S.
- Died: April 14, 1974 (aged 84) Westport, Massachusetts, U.S.
- Party: Republican
- Spouse(s): Phyllis Sears (m. 1916; div. 1940) Milicent Ewell Whittall (m. 1946)
- Education: Harvard University
- Occupation: Businessman, jockey, politician

Bayard Tuckerman Jr. (April 19, 1889 – April 14, 1974) was an American jockey, businessman, and politician.

== Early life ==
Tuckerman was born on April 19, 1889, in Morristown, New Jersey, to Bayard Tuckerman and Annie Smith Tuckerman. He was raised in Hamilton, Massachusetts, and educated at St. Mark's School, Sanford School, and Harvard University.

== Horse racing ==
From 1910 to 1915, Tuckerman rode 100 steeplechase horses. He had 16 wins, but placed in 54% of his races. He was considered a leading amateur rider in the 1920s. In 1927 rode a horse in the American Grand National at Belmont Park.

In the 1930s, Tuckerman raced flat runners and jumpers under the name of Essex Stable.

Tuckerman was a leader the campaign to legalize parimutuel racing in Massachusetts. He helped found Suffolk Downs and was the track's first president. The track named a stakes race in his honor. He also helped turn the old auto racetrack at Rockingham Park into a horse racing course.

Tuckerman and his second wife Milicent founded Little Sunswick Farm. The couple would breed a number of stakes winners including Lavender Hill, 1954's American Champion Older Female Horse.

In 1973 he was inducted into the National Racing Hall of Fame.

== Military service ==
After attending officers training at the Plattsburg Barracks, Tuckerman was commissioned a Second Lieutenant of Infantry in the United States Army on November 27, 1917. He was then transferred to Quartermaster Corps and assigned to Remount Division. While serving with the American Expeditionary Forces, he was assistant remount officer for the advance section Services of Supply, First United States Army, and 1st Corps Observation Group, and remount officer for the 77th Infantry Division. He was discharged on February 25, 1919.

During World War II, Tuckerman drove an ambulance for the American Field Service in North Africa.

== Politics ==
Tuckerman's political career began as a member of the Hamilton Board of Selectmen. From 1929 to 1931 he was a member of the Massachusetts House of Representatives. From 1937 to 1941 he was a member of the Massachusetts Governor's Council.

== Business career ==
Tuckerman worked for the insurance firm Obrion, Russell & Co. from his graduation from Harvard 1911 until his death in 1974. He also served as a director of Ritz-Carlton, the Rockland-Atlas National Bank of Boston, and the Boston Garden-Arena Corporation.

== Personal life ==
On June 20, 1916, he married Phyllis Sears, daughter of wealthy Bostonian Herbert M. Sears, in Beverly Farms. In 1924 the couple hosted Edward, Prince of Wales. One of their sons, Herbert Tuckerman, would follow his father into politics. She filed for divorce on December 6, 1940, in Las Vegas, New Mexico, citing cruelty. Tuckerman stated that he had expected the action and would not contest it.

On August 10, 1946, Tuckerman married Milicent Ewell Whittall at a private ceremony in New Hampshire. Their daughters included Susan Appleton Tuckerman, who married journalist Christopher Dickey in 1969, and photographer Jane Tuckerman. Milicent continued to breed horses following Tuckerman's death. Her horses included Rise Jim, winner of the Tom Fool Handicap in 1981 and 1982. She died on December 3, 2003, at the age of 94.

== Death ==
Tuckerman died on April 14, 1974, at his home in Westport, Massachusetts.

== See also ==
- 1929–1930 Massachusetts legislature

Preceded by First	President of Suffolk Downs; 1935–1936	Succeeded by Charles Adams
