= Louis How =

American poet

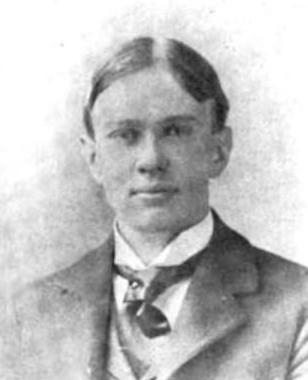
- Born: February 14, 1873; St. Louis, Missouri, US
- Died: October 3, 1947 (aged 74); Gloucester, Massachusetts, US
- Education: Harvard University
- Occupations: Writer, translator
- Relatives: James Eads How (brother); James Buchanan Eads (grandfather)

Louis How (1873–1947) was a prolific American poet and a biographer of his grandfather, James Buchanan Eads, who built the Eads Bridge crossing the Mississippi River at St. Louis.

== Biography ==
Louis How was born in St. Louis on February 14, 1873. He had one brother, James Eads How. Not only was their grandfather a wealthy engineer and contractor, but their father, James Flintham How, was a vice-president and the General Manager of the Wabash Railroad. Thus they were the heirs of one of St. Louis's most wealthy families. While his brother chose to live as a hobo and spent his efforts trying to help the homeless, Louis How graduated from Harvard University in 1895, then "became an artist and took to the gay bohemian life".

While How certainly wrote from a position of knowledge and authority when he created the biography of his grandfather, the biography was criticized in a review from MIT.

Before his poetry was first published, How had compiled a manuscript anthology of American poetry, but never published it. His manuscript was responsible for a revival of interest in early American poet Frederick Goddard Tuckerman.

How died from heart disease at his summer home in Gloucester, Massachusetts on October 3, 1947.

== Criticism ==
How was discussed in an article in Reedy's Mirror (a journal published in his home town of St. Louis) in association with Amy Lowell and Ezra Pound in 1915 in an article written by Zoë Akins.

== Works ==
- James B. Eads. Boston: Houghton Mifflin and Co. (c.1900)
- The Penitentes of San Rafael. Indianapolis: The Bowen-Merrill Co. (1900).

=== Poetry ===
- Lyrics and Sonnets. Boston: Sherman, French (1911).
- The Youth Replies. (1912)
- Barricades. Boston: Sherman, French (1914).
- A Hidden Well: Lyrics and Sonnets. (1916)
- Nursery Rhymes of New York City. (1919)
- Ruin and Gold. London: Chapman & Hall (1924).
- Narcissus and Other Poems. New York: Harbor Press (1928). Illustrated by Walter Dorwin Teague.
- The Other Don Juan. New York: Harbor Press (1932). Illustrated by Steele Savage.
- The Years Relent. Harbor Press. (1936)
- Regional Rhymes of New York City. New York: Harbor Press (1937). Illustrated by Ilse Bischoff.
- An Evening with Ninon, A Didactic Poem containing a translation of Racine's Bernice. New York: Harbor Press (1941). Illustrated by Boris Artzybasheff.

=== Translations ===
- The life of Lazarillo de Tormes and his fortunes and adversities, done out of the Castilian from R. Foulché-Delbosc's restitution of the editio princeps. New York: M. Kennerley (1917)
- Caesar or Nothing, by Pío Baroja. (1919)
- The Comedy of Dante Alighieri, Florentine by Birth but Not in Conduct. (1934–1940). Illustrated by Boris Artzybasheff.
