= Bayard Tuckerman =

American biographer (1855–1923)

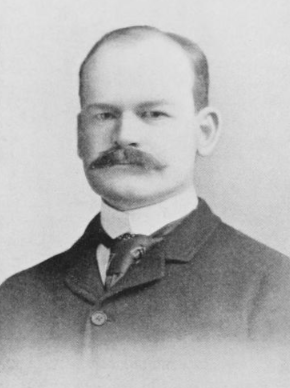
- Born: July 2, 1855; New York, New York, US
- Died: October 20, 1923 (aged 68); Ipswich, Massachusetts, US
- Education: Harvard University
- Occupations: Biographer, historian
- Employer: Princeton University
- Spouse: Annie Osgood Smith (m. 1882)
- Children: 4, including Bayard Tuckerman Jr.

Bayard Tuckerman (July 2, 1855 – October 20, 1923) was a United States biographer and historian.

== Biography ==
Bayard Tuckerman was born in New York City on July 2, 1855, the son of iron manufacturer Lucius Tuckerman and Elizabeth Wolcott Gibbs Tuckerman.

He studied for two years in Neuchâtel, Switzerland, at the Pension Roulet, and later graduated from Harvard in 1878, and became a writer on historical and literary subjects. He lectured on English literature for Princeton University from 1898 to 1907. He married Annie Osgood Smith in 1882; they had four children, among whom was Bayard Tuckerman Jr., a noted jockey.

Bayard Tuckerman died at his home in Ipswich, Massachusetts on October 20, 1923.

== Works ==
- A History of English Prose Fiction (New York, 1882)
- Life of General Lafayette (1889)
- The Diary of Philip Hone (1889)
- Peter Stuyvesant, Director-General for the West India Company in New Netherland (1893)
- William Jay and the Constitutional Movement for the Abolition of Slavery (1894)
- Life of General Philip Schuyler (1903)
