= Stephen Salisbury Tuckerman =

American painter

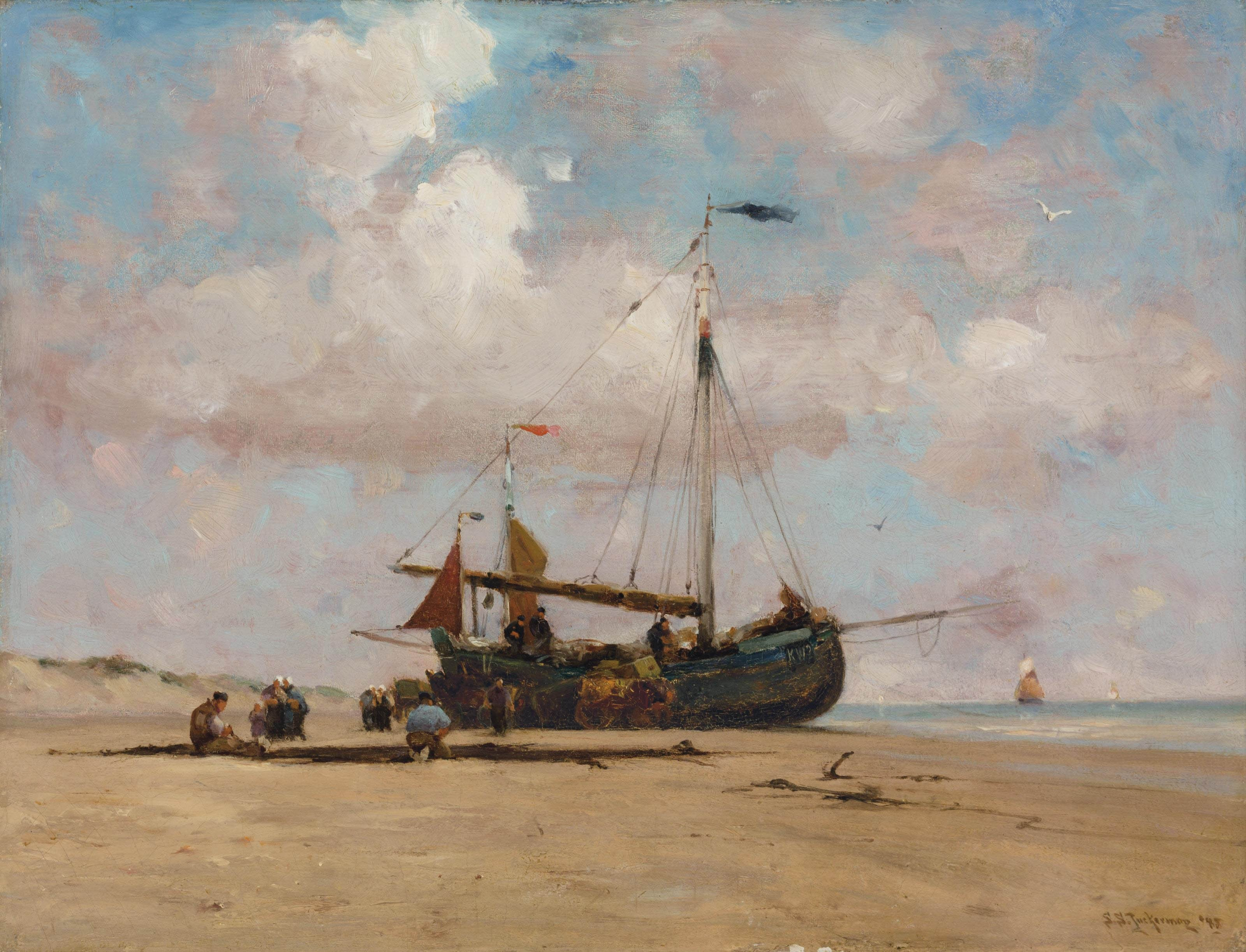
“The Beached Boat” (1885)

Stephen Salisbury Tuckerman (8 December 1830 Boston - 1904) was an American painter.

== Biography ==
At first he engaged in business, but subsequently studied drawing in Birmingham, England, and on his return to Boston became principal of the New England School of Design. He married Laura Willis Bumstead in 1855. He went abroad again in 1860, and studied in Paris for a year. After this he taught drawing in Boston until 1864, when he devoted himself entirely to painting. After 1872 he worked chiefly abroad, and exhibited in London, Paris, and in Holland, as well as in the United States. He also had a residence in Gloucester, Massachusetts.

== Work ==
He is noted especially for his marine views, among which are “Beach at Hastings”; “U. S. Frigate ‘Constitution’ escaping from the British Fleet in 1812,” which is in the Boston Museum of Fine Arts; and “Dutch Fishing-Boats Beaching in a Gale.”
